= 2024–25 Harrogate Town A.F.C. season =

111th season in existence of Harrogate Town AFC

Harrogate Town
2024–25 season
- Chairman: Irving Weaver
- Manager: Simon Weaver
- Stadium: Wetherby Road
- League Two: 18th
- FA Cup: Third round
- EFL Cup: Second round
- EFL Trophy: Group stage
- Top goalscorer: League: Josh March (8 goals); All: Josh March (8 goals)
- Highest home attendance: 3,507
- Lowest home attendance: 2,236

The 2024–25 season was the 111th season in the history of Harrogate Town Association Football Club and their fifth consecutive season in League Two. In addition to the domestic league, the club would also participate in the FA Cup, the EFL Cup, and the EFL Trophy.

== Transfers ==
=== In ===
Date	Pos.	Player	From	Fee	Ref.
1 July 2024 (Note: The transfer was announced on 17 June, and would become official on July 1 once his Queens Park Rangers contract expired)	RM	Stephen Duke-McKenna (GUY)	Queens Park Rangers (ENG)	Free	
8 July 2024	CB	Zico Asare (ENG)	Maidenhead United (ENG)	Undisclosed	
16 July 2024	LW	Ellis Taylor (ENG)	Sunderland (ENG)	Free	
12 November 2024	RW	Eno Nto (ENG)	Derby County (ENG)	Free	
2 December 2024	CF	Admiral Muskwe (ZIM)	Luton Town (ENG)	Free	
1 January 2025 (Note: The transfer was announced on 31 December, and would become official on January 1 once the transfer window re-opened.)	DM	Bryn Morris (ENG)	Newport County (WAL)	Undisclosed	
21 January 2025	CF	Tom Cursons (ENG)	Ilkeston Town (ENG)	Undisclosed	
22 January 2025	CM	Thomas Hill (WAL)	Liverpool (ENG)	Free	
3 February 2025	DM	Ben Fox (ENG)	Northampton Town (ENG)	Free	

=== Out ===
Date	Pos.	Player	To	Fee	Ref.
14 June 2024 (Note: The transfer was announced on 21 May, and would become official on June 14 once the transfer window re-opens)	LW	Abraham Odoh (ENG)	Peterborough United (ENG)	Undisclosed	
24 June 2024	CB	Rod McDonald (ENG)	Notts County (ENG)	Undisclosed	
24 January 2025	RW	Sam Folarin (ENG)	Hartlepool United (ENG)	Undisclosed	

=== Loaned in ===
Date	Pos.	Player	From	Date until	Ref.
30 August 2024	CB	Jasper Moon (ENG)	Burton Albion (ENG)	End of Season	
7 January 2025	CB	Eko Solomon (ENG)	Huddersfield Town (ENG)	End of Season	
15 January 2025	LB	Bryant Bilongo (ENG)	Bristol Rovers (ENG)	End of Season	
16 January 2025	CF	Olly Sanderson (ENG)	Fulham (ENG)	End of Season	

=== Loaned out ===
Date	Pos.	Player	To	Date until	Ref.
3 February 2025	RM	Stephen Duke-McKenna (GUY)	St Johnstone (SCO)	End of Season	

=== Released / Out of Contract ===
Date	Pos.	Player	Subsequent club	Join date	Ref.
30 June 2024	CB	Will Smith (ENG)	FC Halifax Town (ENG)	1 July 2024	
30 June 2024	CM	George Horbury (ENG)	Chorley (ENG)	4 July 2024	
30 June 2024	GK	Peter Jameson (ENG)	Darlington (ENG)	5 July 2024	
30 June 2024	CF	Emmanuel Ilesanmi (ENG)	Derby County (ENG)	11 July 2024	
30 June 2024	LB	Joe Mattock (ENG)	Marine (ENG)	25 August 2024	
30 June 2024	RM	Finn O'Boyle (ENG)	Wigan Athletic (ENG)	9 September 2024	
30 June 2024	CF	Josh Brodella (ENG)			
30 June 2024	CM	Alfie Lee (ENG)			
30 June 2024	GK	Jonathan Mitchell (ENG)			
30 June 2024	GK	Alex Mooney (ENG)			
30 June 2024	CB	Ollie Nicholson (ENG)			
30 June 2024	CF	Elijah Samuels (ENG)			
30 June 2024	CB	Lewis Smalley (ENG)			
30 June 2024	CB	Cadarn Taylor (ENG)			
30 June 2024	GK	Lewis Thomas (ENG)			
30 June 2024	RM	Bradley Williams (ENG)			

== Pre-season and friendlies ==
On 16 May, Harrogate announced their first pre-season friendly against Lincoln City. A day later, a second fixture was confirmed, against Huddersfield Town. A further two matches were added to the schedule, against Sheffield United and Darlington. On 7 June, two more home pre-season friendlies were announced against Middlesbrough and Leeds United.

Win Draw Loss Fixtures

13 July 2024 Friendly	Harrogate Town	2–3	Huddersfield Town	Harrogate
15:00 BST	Duke-McKenna; Trialist	Report	Ward; Healey; Sørensen	Stadium: Wetherby Road

19 July 2024 Friendly	Harrogate Town	0–3	Leeds United	Harrogate
19:30 BST		Report	Firpo; Rutter; Chambers	Stadium: Wetherby Road

23 July 2024 Friendly	Harrogate Town	1–4	Sheffield United	Harrogate
19:00 BST	Muldoon 23'	Report	Brooks 10'; O'Hare 35'; Hampson 68'; Marsh 88'	Stadium: Wetherby Road

27 July 2024 Friendly	Harrogate Town	0–4	Lincoln City	Harrogate
15:00 BST		Report	Duffy; Roughan; Draper; Street	Stadium: Wetherby Road

31 July 2024 Friendly	Harrogate Town	0–0	Middlesbrough	Harrogate
19:30 BST		Report		Stadium: Wetherby Road

3 August 2024 Friendly	Darlington	0–0	Harrogate Town	Darlington
15:00 BST		Report		Stadium: Blackwell Meadows

== Competitions ==
=== League Two ===
==== League table ====
Pos	Team	Pld	W	D	L	GF	GA	GD	Pts
16	Barrow	46	15	14	17	52	50	+2	59
17	Gillingham	46	14	16	16	41	46	−5	58
18	Harrogate Town	46	14	11	21	43	61	−18	53
19	Milton Keynes Dons	46	14	10	22	52	66	−14	52
20	Tranmere Rovers	46	12	15	19	45	65	−20	51

Source: EFL Official Website
Rules for classification: 1) Points; 2) Goal difference; 3) Number of goals scored; 4) Head-to-head results; 5) Wins; 6) Away goals; 7) Penalty points (sec 9.5); 8) 12-point sending off offences

==== Results summary ====
Overall								Home						Away					
Pld	W	D	L	GF	GA	GD	Pts	W	D	L	GF	GA	GD	W	D	L	GF	GA	GD
46	14	11	21	43	61	−18	53	10	4	9	26	31	−5	4	7	12	17	30	−13

Last updated: 26 April 2025.
Source: Soccerway

==== Results by round ====
Round	1	2	3	4	5	6	7	8	9	10	11	12	13	14	15	16	17	18	19	20	21	22	23	24	25	26	27	28	29	30	31	32	33	34	35	36	37	38	39	40	41	42	43	44	45	46
Ground	H	A	A	H	A	H	A	H	H	A	H	A	H	A	H	H	A	A	H	A	H	A	A	H	A	H	H	A	A	H	A	H	A	H	A	H	A	A	H	H	A	H	A	H	H	A
Result	L	D	W	L	L	W	L	W	L	D	W	D	L	L	L	W	W	L	L	L	L	L	D	L	W	W	D	L	L	D	L	W	L	W	D	W	L	D	D	W	L	D	D	W	L	W
Position	21	18	13	16	20	18	20	14	18	18	14	14	16	17	20	17	17	18	19	20	20	20	20	22	21	19	18	19	20	20	21	20	20	20	20	20	21	21	21	20	20	20	20	19	20	18
Points	0	1	4	4	4	7	7	10	10	11	14	15	15	15	15	18	21	21	21	21	21	21	22	22	25	28	29	29	29	30	30	33	33	36	37	40	40	41	42	45	45	46	47	50	50	53

Source: EFL
A = Away; H = Home; W = Win; D = Draw; L = Loss; P = Postponed

==== Matches ====
On 26 June, the League Two fixtures were announced.

Win Draw Loss Fixtures

10 August 2024 1	Harrogate Town	0–2	Bromley	Harrogate
15:00 BST	O'Connor (yellow card) 32'	Report	Cheek (yellow card) 40', (goal) 62'; Grant 71'; Whitely (yellow card) 77'; Charles (yellow card) 88'; Imray (yellow card) 90+5'	Stadium: Wetherby Road; Referee: Thomas Parsons

17 August 2024 2	Accrington Stanley	3–3	Harrogate Town	Accrington
15:00 BST	O'Brien (yellow card) 5'; Walton 29'; Knowles 60'; Mooney 62'	Report	Daly 16'; Taylor 33'; Folarin (yellow card) 57' (goal) 90+3'	Stadium: Crown Ground; Attendance: 1905; Referee: Dale Baines

24 August 2024 3	Colchester United	0–1	Harrogate Town	Colchester
15:00 BST	Hunt (yellow card) 53'	Report	Folarin 68'; Taylor (yellow card) 72'; M. Daly (yellow card) 85'; J. Daly (yellow card) 89'	Stadium: Colchester Community Stadium; Attendance: 3,883; Referee: Craig Hicks

31 August 2024 4	Harrogate Town	0–1	Barrow	Harrogate
15:00 BST	Daly (yellow card) 54'; Asare (yellow card) 59'; Duke-McKenna (yellow card) 70'; Foulds (yellow card) 73'	Report	Eccleston 74'; Gotts (yellow card) 85'	Stadium: Wetherby Road; Attendance: 2,270; Referee: Scott Simpson

7 September 2024 5	Cheltenham Town	1–0	Harrogate Town	Cheltenham
15:00 BST	Haynes (yellow card) 71'; Bradbury 90+2'; Taylor (yellow card) 90+4'	Report	Folarin (yellow card) 64'	Stadium: Whaddon Road; Attendance: 3,594; Referee: Daniel Middleton

12 September 2024 6	Harrogate Town	2–0	Doncaster Rovers	Harrogate
20:00 BST	Taylor 27', (yellow card) 88'; O'Connor (yellow card) 45'; March 45+1'; Muldoon (yellow card) 86'	Report	Fleming (yellow card) 25'; McGrath (yellow card) 58'; Clifton (yellow card) 75'	Stadium: Wetherby Road; Attendance: 3,123; Referee: Thomas Kirk
Note: Fixture was initially scheduled for 14 September, but was moved for live Sky Sports broadcast.

21 September 2024 7	Crewe Alexandra	3–0	Harrogate Town	Crewe
15:00 GMT	Hemmings 7', 88'; Lankester 31', (yellow card) 68'; Tabiner (yellow card) 46'; Knight-Lebel (yellow card) 87'	Report	Gibson (yellow card) 28'; Cornelius (yellow card) 37'; Taylor (yellow card) 79'	Stadium: Gresty Road; Attendance: 4,320; Referee: Ruebyn Ricardo

28 September 2024 8	Harrogate Town	2–1	Bradford City	Harrogate
12:30 BST	Dooley 11'; Taylor 23'; Belshaw (yellow card) 89'; Sutton (yellow card) 90+3'	Report	Cook 28'; Walker (yellow card) 40'	Stadium: Wetherby Road; Attendance: 3,059; Referee: Martin Coy
Note: Fixture was initially scheduled for a 15:00 kick-off, but was moved for live Sky Sports broadcast.

1 October 2024 9	Harrogate Town	1–5	Milton Keynes Dons	Harrogate
19:45 BST	Offord 73' (o.g.)	Report	Leigh 35'; White 45+2'; Gilbey 45+4'; Lemonheigh-Evans 87'; Finch 90'	Stadium: Wetherby Road; Attendance: 1,694; Referee: Aaron Bannister

5 October 2024 10	Swindon Town	0–0	Harrogate Town	Swindon
15:00 BST	Longelo (yellow card) 86'	Report	Muldoon (yellow card) 90+3'	Stadium: County Ground; Attendance: 6,333; Referee: Martin Woods

12 October 2024 11	Harrogate Town	1–0	Newport County	Harrogate
15:00 BST	Sims 40'	Report	Baker-Richardson (yellow card) 82'	Stadium: Wetherby Road; Attendance: 2,564; Referee: Declan Bourne

19 October 2024 12	Carlisle United	1–1	Harrogate Town	Carlisle
15:00 BST	Armstrong 44'; Mellish (yellow card) 74'; Robinson (yellow card) 82'	Report	Daly 39'	Stadium: Brunton Park; Attendance: 8,297; Referee: Richie Watkins

22 October 2024 13	Harrogate Town	0–1	Port Vale	Harrogate
19:45 BST	Moon (yellow card) 53'	Report	Paton 54'; Curtis (yellow card) 78'; Cover (yellow card) 89'	Stadium: Wetherby Road; Attendance: 2,780; Referee: Elliot Bell

26 October 2024 14	Notts County	1–0	Harrogate Town	Nottingham
15:00 BST	Jatta 58'; Tsaroulla (yellow card) 88'	Report	Folarin (yellow card) 72'; Daly (yellow card) 83'	Stadium: Meadow Lane; Attendance: 9,427; Referee: Darren Drysdale

9 November 2024 15	Harrogate Town	1–2	Morecambe	Harrogate
12:30 GMT	Daly 86'	Report	Williams 37'; Macadam (yellow card) 90+2', (goal) 90+6'	Stadium: Wetherby Road; Attendance: 2,982; Referee: Alex Chilowicz
Note: Fixture was initially scheduled for a 15:00 kick-off, but was moved for live Sky Sports broadcast.

16 November 2024 16	Harrogate Town	2–1	Chesterfield	Harrogate
15:00 GMT	Moon (yellow card) 17'; Sims 57'; Asare (yellow card) 67'; Falkingham (yellow card) 73'; Cornelius 90+1'	Report	Banks (yellow card) 28'; Tanton (yellow card) 45'; Grigg (yellow card) 57'; Berry 77'; Naylor (yellow card) 90+4'; Dobra (yellow card) 90+5'	Stadium: Wetherby Road; Attendance: 3,686; Referee: John Mulligan

23 November 2024 17	Gillingham	1–2	Harrogate Town	Gillingham
15:00 GMT	Dieng 51'; Ogie (yellow card) 55'; Lapslie (yellow card) 78'	Report	O'Connor 59'; March 71'; Asare (yellow card) 90+6'	Stadium: Priestfield Stadium; Attendance: 5,611; Referee: Matthew Russell

3 December 2024 18	Salford City	2–0	Harrogate Town	Kersal
19:45 GMT	Woodburn 10'; Stockton 72'; Mnoga (yellow card) 80'; Ashley (yellow card) 87'	Report	Cornelius (yellow card) 26'; Sims (yellow card) 33'	Stadium: Moor Lane; Attendance: 1,838; Referee: Michael Barlow

7 December 2024 19	Harrogate Town	0–3	AFC Wimbledon	Harrogate
15:00 GMT	O'Connor (yellow card) 22'; Daly (yellow card) 61'	Report	Kelly 12', (yellow card) 73'; O'Toole 23'; Stevens 50'	Stadium: Wetherby Road; Attendance: 2,506; Referee: Jacob Miles

14 December 2024 20	Tranmere Rovers	2–1	Harrogate Town	Birkenhead
12:30 GMT	Dennis 25', (yellow card) 90+2'; Saunders (yellow card) 63'; Patrick 67'	Report	Daly 14'; Sims (yellow card) 35'	Stadium: Prenton Park; Attendance: 5,122; Referee: Tom Reeves
Note: Fixture was initially scheduled for a 15:00 kick-off, but was moved for live Sky Sports broadcast.

21 December 2024 21	Harrogate Town	0–2	Walsall	Harrogate
15:00 GMT	March (yellow card) 35' (yellow-red card) 38'; Foulds (yellow card) 76'	Report	Lowe 34'; Adomah 69'	Stadium: Wetherby Road; Attendance: 2,843; Referee: Sam Mulhall

26 December 2024 22	Grimsby Town	2–1	Harrogate Town	Cleethorpes
15:00 GMT	Khouri 55'; Svanthórsson 74', (yellow card) 90+3'; McEachran (yellow card) 90+2'	Report	Duke-McKenna 82'; Bray (yellow card) 90+1'; Sutton (yellow card) 90+6'	Stadium: Blundell Park; Attendance: 6,514; Referee: Darren Drysdale

29 December 2024 23	Fleetwood Town	1–1	Harrogate Town	Fleetwood
15:00 GMT	Bolton 2'; Sarpong-Wiredu (yellow card) 25'; Potter (yellow card) 77'; Patterson (penalty missed) 90+1'; Mayor (yellow card) 90+3'	Report	March 8'; Cornelius (yellow card) 65'	Stadium: Highbury Stadium; Attendance: 2,468; Referee: Simon Mather

1 January 2025 24	Harrogate Town	0–2	Salford City	Harrogate
15:00 GMT	March (yellow card) 56'; Sutton (yellow card) 90+4'	Report	Stockton 39'; Mnoga (yellow card) 45+3'; Lund 56'; Ashley (yellow card) 78'	Stadium: Wetherby Road; Attendance: 2,814; Referee: Scott Oldham

4 January 2025 25	Barrow	0–2	Harrogate Town	Barrow-in-Furness
15:00 GMT	Eccleston (yellow card) 58'; Farman (yellow card) 61'; Mahoney (penalty missed) 75'; Vassell (yellow card) 83'; Spence (yellow card) 90+1'	Report	Morris (yellow card) 19'; Burrell (yellow card) 23'; Muldoon 56'; March 61'	Stadium: Holker Street; Attendance: 3,148; Referee: Stuart Morland

17 January 2025 27	Harrogate Town	2–0	Cheltenham Town	Harrogate
19:45 GMT	Young 34' (o.g.); Bennett 56' (o.g.)	Report	Kinsella (yellow card) 20'	Stadium: Wetherby Road; Attendance: 2,522; Referee: Ross Joyce
Note: Fixture was initially scheduled for 18 January, but was brought forward.

21 January 2025 26	Harrogate Town	0–0	Colchester United	Harrogate
19:45 GMT	Daly (yellow card) 27'; Sims (yellow card) 37'; Sutton (yellow card) 57'	Report	Flanagan (yellow card) 58'	Stadium: Wetherby Road; Attendance: 2,284; Referee: Scott Tallis

25 January 2025 28	Doncaster Rovers	1–0	Harrogate Town	Doncaster
15:00 GMT	Clifton 86'	Report	Moon (yellow card) 74'; Belshaw (yellow card) 84'	Stadium: Eco-Power Stadium; Attendance: 7,241; Referee: Richard Eley

28 January 2025 29	Milton Keynes Dons	2–1	Harrogate Town	Denbigh
19:45 GMT	Thompson (yellow card) 18'; White 27', (yellow card) 70'; Waller (yellow card) 40'; Gilbey (yellow card) 68', (goal) 90+3'	Report	Morris (yellow card) 29'; Sutton (yellow card) 54'; Asare 90+2'; Hill (yellow card) 90+5'	Stadium: Stadium MK; Attendance: 5,101; Referee: Lee Swabey

1 February 2025 30	Harrogate Town	1–1	Crewe Alexandra	Harrogate
15:00 GMT	March 28'; Sutton (yellow card) 52'	Report	Long 58'	Stadium: Wetherby Road; Attendance: 2,704; Referee: Michael Barlow

8 February 2025 31	Bradford City	1–0	Harrogate Town	Bradford
12:30 GMT	Sarcevic 2'; Smallwood (yellow card) 40'	Report	Bilongo (yellow card) 20'; Fox (yellow card) 85'	Stadium: Valley Parade; Attendance: 17,126; Referee: Oliver Yates

15 February 2025 32	Harrogate Town	1–0	Swindon Town	Harrogate
15:00 GMT	Moon 53'	Report		Stadium: Wetherby Road; Attendance: 2,909; Referee: Simon Mather

22 February 2025 33	Bromley	2-0	Harrogate Town	Bromley
15:00 GMT	Cheek 30'; Arthurs 45'	Report		Stadium: Hayes Lane; Referee: James Oldham

1 March 2025 34	Harrogate Town	2–1	Accrington Stanley	Harrogate
15:00 GMT	Moon 19'; Muldoon (yellow card) 33'; Sims (yellow card) 42'; March 58'; Gibson (yellow card) 88'	Report	Ward (yellow card) 38'; Love (yellow card) 45+4'; Woods 50'; Hunter (yellow card) 68'; Walton (yellow card) 90+2'	Stadium: Wetherby Road; Attendance: 3,015; Referee: Matt Corlett

4 March 2025 35	Port Vale	0–0	Harrogate Town	Burslem
19:45 GMT		Report	Cursons (yellow card) 58'; Sims (yellow card) 78'	Stadium: Vale Park; Attendance: 5,107; Referee: Sam Allison

8 March 2025 36	Harrogate Town	1–0	Carlisle United	Harrogate
15:00 GMT	Taylor (yellow card) 26'; Morris (yellow card) 56'; Vela 90+5' (o.g.)	Report	Davies (yellow card) 30'; Whelan (yellow card) 55'; Vela (yellow card) 67'; Hayden (yellow card) 67'	Stadium: Wetherby Road; Attendance: 4,136; Referee: Seb Stockbridge

15 March 2025 37	Newport County	3–0	Harrogate Town	Newport
15:00 GMT	Evans 2'; Baker-Richardson 15'; Clarke 61'	Report		Stadium: Rodney Parade; Attendance: 3,756; Referee: Jamie O'Connor

22 March 2025 38	Chesterfield	0–0	Harrogate Town	Chesterfield
15:00 GMT		Report	Morris (yellow card) 21'	Stadium: SMH Group Stadium; Attendance: 8,540; Referee: Benjamin Speedie

29 March 2025 39	Harrogate Town	1–1	Gillingham	Harrogate
15:00 GMT	March (yellow card) 11', (goal) 40' (pen.); O'Connor (yellow card) 81'	Report	Morris (yellow card) 39'; Clark (yellow card) 43', (goal) 68' (pen.); Smith (yellow card) 60'; Williams (yellow card) 81'; Masterson (yellow card) 85'	Stadium: Wetherby Road; Attendance: 3,253; Referee: David Rock

1 April 2024 40	Harrogate Town	3−2	Tranmere Rovers	Harrogate
19:45 BST	Taylor 33'; Sims (yellow card) 55'; Cursons 58', (yellow card) 64'; Fox 75'	Report	Turnbull (yellow card) 50'; Hendry 61' (yellow card) 75'; Finley (yellow card) 74'; Patrick 78'	Stadium: Wetherby Road; Attendance: 3,325; Referee: Zac Kennard-Kettle

5 April 2025 41	AFC Wimbledon	1−0	Harrogate Town	Wimbledon
15:00 BST	Smith 77'	Report	Muldoon (yellow card) 42'	Stadium: Plough Lane; Attendance: 8,341; Referee: Thomas Parsons

12 April 2025 42	Harrogate Town	2−2	Grimsby Town	Harrogate
15:00 GMT	March (yellow card) 23'; Taylor 85'; Rose 88' (o.g.)	Report	Green 39'; Svanþórsson 45+4'	Stadium: Wetherby Road; Attendance: 3,881; Referee: Aaron Bannister

18 April 2025 43	Walsall	2–2	Harrogate Town	Walsall
15:00 BST	O'Connor 16' (o.g.); Chang (yellow card) 84'; Gordon 88'; Stirk (yellow card) 90+2'	Report	March 22'; Moon (yellow card) 34'; Bilongo (yellow card) 37'; Taylor (yellow card) 43', (goal) 62'; Fox (yellow card) 51'	Stadium: Bescot Stadium; Attendance: 7,408; Referee: Scott Simpson

21 April 2025 44	Harrogate Town	3–1	Fleetwood Town	Harrogate
15:00 BST	Asare (yellow card) 10'; Moon 56'; Taylor 61'; Fox (yellow card) 78'; Cursons 90+6'	Report	Moore (yellow card) 19' (goal) 51'; Bennett (yellow card) 48'	Stadium: Wetherby Road; Attendance: 3,081; Referee: Scott Simpson

26 April 2025 45	Harrogate Town	1–3	Notts County	Harrogate
13:00 BST	Muldoon 37'	Report	Abbott 33'; Grant 51', 76'	Stadium: Wetherby Road; Attendance: 4,136; Referee: Richie Watkins
Note: Fixture was initially scheduled for a 15:00 kick-off, but was brought forward.

3 May 2025 46	Morecambe	1–2	Harrogate Town	Morecambe
15:00 BST	Taylor 12'; Lewis (yellow card) 59'	Report	Bilongo 19'; March 22'	Stadium: Mazuma Mobile Stadium; Attendance: 3,043; Referee: Ollie Yates

=== FA Cup ===
Harrogate Town were drawn at home to League One side Wrexham in the first round, to Northern Premier League side Gainsborough Trinity in the second round and away to Championship side Leeds United in the third round.

Win Draw Loss Fixtures

3 November 2024 First round	Harrogate Town	1–0	Wrexham	Harrogate
15:30 GMT	Muldoon 24'; March (yellow card) 61'	Report	Dobson (yellow card) 67'; McClean (yellow card) 74'; Mullin (yellow card) 88'	Stadium: Wetherby Road; Attendance: 3,893; Referee: Edward Duckworth

29 November 2024 Second round	Harrogate Town	1–0	Gainsborough Trinity	Harrogate
19:45 GMT	Sims (yellow card) 52'; Cornelius 57'; Falkingham (yellow card) 81'	Report	Cogill (yellow card) 52'; Lancaster (yellow card) 63'	Stadium: Wetherby Road; Attendance: 4,010; Referee: Farai Hallam

11 January 2025 Third round	Leeds United	1–0	Harrogate Town	Leeds
17:45 GMT	Ramazani 59', (yellow card) 80'; Guilavogui (yellow card) 64'	Report	Morris (yellow card) 21'; Burrell (yellow card) 83'	Stadium: Elland Road; Attendance: 35,584; Referee: James Bell

=== EFL Cup ===
On 27 June, the draw for the first round was made, with Harrogate being drawn away against Lincoln City. In the second round, they were drawn at home to Preston North End.

Win Draw Loss Fixtures

13 August 2024 First round	Lincoln City	1–2	Harrogate Town	Lincoln
19:45 BST	Moylan (yellow card) 57'; Makama 85' (pen.)	Report	Folarin 49'; Sutton (yellow card) 56'; Daly 61'	Stadium: Sincil Bank; Attendance: 3,507; Referee: Scott Tallis

27 August 2024 Second round	Harrogate Town	0–5	Preston North End	Harrogate
19:45 BST	O'Connor (yellow card) 13'	Report	Greenwood 14', 37' (pen.); Osmajić 39', 45+1', 83'	Stadium: Wetherby Road; Attendance: 2,570; Referee: Ben Speedie

=== EFL Trophy ===
In the group stage, Harrogate were drawn into Northern Group E alongside Blackpool, Crewe Alexandra and Liverpool U21.

Pos	Div	Team	Pld	W	PW	PL	L	GF	GA	GD	Pts	Qualification
1	L1	Blackpool	3	1	1	1	0	6	3	+3	6	Advance to Round 2
2	L2	Crewe Alexandra	3	2	0	0	1	7	5	+2	6	Advance to Round 2
3	ACA	Liverpool U21	3	0	1	1	1	2	6	−4	3	
4	L2	Harrogate Town	3	0	1	1	1	3	4	−1	3	

Source: EFL

Win Draw Loss Fixtures

24 September 2024 Group stage	Harrogate Town	1–1 (4–2 p)	Liverpool U21	Harrogate
19:45 BST	Muldoon 44'	Report	Norris 75'; Kelly (yellow card) 90+4'	Stadium: Wetherby Road; Attendance: 2,037; Referee: Zac Kennard-Kettle
	Penalties
	Taylor (penalty scored); March (penalty scored); Foulds (penalty scored); Duke-McKenna (penalty scored)		(penalty missed) Miles; (penalty scored) Pilling; (penalty scored) Davidson; (penalty missed) Koné-Doherty

8 October 2024 Group stage	Crewe Alexandra	1–0	Harrogate Town	Crewe
19:45 BST	Agius 30'	Report		Stadium: Gresty Road; Attendance: 780; Referee: James Oldham

12 November 2024 Group stage	Harrogate Town	2–2 (4–5 p)	Blackpool	Harrogate
19:00 GMT	Nto 26'; Burrell 38'; Daly (yellow card) 47'; Sutton (yellow card) 56'	Report	Rhodes 79'; Finnigan 88'	Stadium: Wetherby Road; Attendance: 1,343; Referee: Oliver Mackey
	Penalties
	Muldoon (penalty missed); March (penalty scored); Foulds (penalty scored); Duke-McKenna (penalty scored); Cornelius (penalty scored)		(penalty scored) Rhodes; (penalty scored) Embleton; (penalty scored) Hamilton; (penalty scored) Husband; (penalty scored) Apter

== Statistics ==
=== Appearances and goals ===
As of match played 26 April 2025

Players with no appearances are not included on the list
Italics indicate a loaned in player

No.	Pos	Nat	Player	Total		League Two		FA Cup		EFL Cup		EFL Trophy	
No.	Pos	Nat	Player	Apps	Goals	Apps	Goals	Apps	Goals	Apps	Goals	Apps	Goals
1	GK	(England) ENG	Mark Oxley	4	0	0+1	0	0+0	0	0+0	0	3+0	0
2	DF	(England) ENG	Zico Asare	33	1	15+10	1	2+1	0	2+0	0	3+0	0
3	DF	(England) ENG	Matty Foulds	19	0	13+1	0	1+0	0	2+0	0	0+2	0
4	MF	(England) ENG	Josh Falkingham	11	0	5+2	0	0+1	0	0+0	0	3+0	0
5	DF	(England) ENG	Jasper Moon	46	3	40+0	3	3+0	0	0+0	0	3+0	0
6	DF	(England) ENG	Warren Burrell	34	1	19+8	0	1+1	0	2+0	0	3+0	1
7	MF	(England) ENG	George Thomson	1	0	1+0	0	0+0	0	0+0	0	0+0	0
8	MF	(Scotland) SCO	Dean Cornelius	42	2	30+5	1	3+0	1	0+1	0	2+1	0
9	MF	(Guyana) GUY	Stephen Duke-McKenna	24	1	12+6	1	2+1	0	0+1	0	1+1	0
10	MF	(England) ENG	Matty Daly	17	1	13+2	1	0+0	0	2+0	0	0+0	0
11	FW	(England) ENG	James Daly	44	4	31+6	3	2+1	0	2+0	1	2+0	0
14	DF	(England) ENG	Toby Sims	46	2	38+2	2	2+0	0	2+0	0	2+0	0
15	DF	(Republic of Ireland) IRL	Anthony O'Connor	50	1	44+0	1	3+0	0	2+0	0	0+1	0
16	FW	(England) ENG	Olly Sanderson	8	0	4+4	0	0+0	0	0+0	0	0+0	0
17	MF	(England) ENG	Levi Sutton	34	0	19+8	0	1+1	0	2+0	0	2+1	0
18	FW	(England) ENG	Jack Muldoon	47	4	28+11	2	3+0	1	0+2	0	1+2	1
19	MF	(Wales) WAL	Thomas Hill	6	0	2+4	0	0+0	0	0+0	0	0+0	0
20	DF	(England) ENG	Bryant Bilongo	15	0	8+7	0	0+0	0	0+0	0	0+0	0
21	FW	(England) ENG	Ellis Taylor	41	7	32+3	7	1+1	0	2+0	0	1+1	0
22	MF	(Northern Ireland) NIR	Stephen Dooley	28	1	18+5	1	2+1	0	0+1	0	1+0	0
24	FW	(England) ENG	Josh March	40	8	28+5	8	3+0	0	1+0	0	1+2	0
25	FW	(England) ENG	Tom Cursons	15	2	5+10	2	0+0	0	0+0	0	0+0	0
26	FW	(Zimbabwe) ZIM	Admiral Muskwe	1	0	0+1	0	0+0	0	0+0	0	0+0	0
27	MF	(England) ENG	Ben Fox	14	1	13+1	1	0+0	0	0+0	0	0+0	0
28	MF	(England) ENG	Bryn Morris	22	0	20+1	0	1+0	0	0+0	0	0+0	0
29	DF	(England) ENG	Eko Solomon	3	0	0+3	0	0+0	0	0+0	0	0+0	0
30	MF	(England) ENG	Liam Gibson	11	0	6+3	0	0+0	0	0+1	0	1+0	0
31	GK	(England) ENG	James Belshaw	50	0	45+0	0	3+0	0	2+0	0	0+0	0
32	FW	(England) ENG	Jack Bray	2	0	0+1	0	0+0	0	0+0	0	0+1	0
33	FW	(England) ENG	Oli Robinson	1	0	0+0	0	0+0	0	0+0	0	1+0	0
Player(s) who featured but departed the club permanently during the season:
12	FW	(England) ENG	Sam Folarin	25	3	6+13	2	0+3	0	1+0	1	2+0	0
27	FW	(England) ENG	Eno Nto	3	1	0+2	0	0+0	0	0+0	0	1+0	1
