= 2023–24 Harrogate Town A.F.C. season =

110th season in existence of Harrogate AFC

Harrogate Town
2023–24 season
- Chairman: Irving Weaver
- Manager: Simon Weaver
- Stadium: Wetherby Road
- League Two: 13th
- FA Cup: Second round
- EFL Cup: Second round
- EFL Trophy: Group stage

The 2023–24 season was the 110th season in the history of Harrogate Town and their fourth consecutive season in League Two. The club also participated in League Two, the FA Cup, the EFL Cup, and the 2023–24 EFL Trophy.

== Current squad ==
As of 10 February 2024

No.	Name	Position	Nationality	Place of birth	Date of birth (age)	Previous club	Date signed	Fee	Contract end
Goalkeepers
1	Mark Oxley	GK	(England)	Sheffield	28 September 1990 (age 36)	Southend United	1 July 2021	Free	30 June 2025
21	Jonathan Mitchell	GK	(England)	Hartlepool	24 November 1994 (age 31)	Doncaster Rovers	3 November 2023	Free	30 June 2024
31	James Belshaw	GK	(England)	Nottingham	12 October 1990 (age 36)	Bristol Rovers	11 January 2024	Undisclosed	30 June 2024
38	Lewis Thomas	GK	(England)	Leicester	8 February 2002 (age 24)	Burnley	1 July 2023	Free	30 June 2024
Defenders
2	Derrick Abu	RB	(England)	(Germany) Regensburg	18 December 2003 (age 22)	Southampton	1 February 2024	Loan	31 May 2024
3	Joe Mattock	LB	(England)	Leicester	15 May 1990 (age 36)	Rotherham United	1 July 2022	Free	30 June 2024
5	Will Smith	CB	(England)	Leeds	4 November 1998 (age 28)	Barnsley	1 July 2019	Free	30 June 2024
6	Warren Burrell	RB	(England)	Sheffield	3 June 1990 (age 36)	Buxton	1 January 2016	Free	30 June 2025
15	Anthony O'Connor	CB	(Republic of Ireland)	Cork	25 October 1992 (age 34)	Morecambe	11 January 2023	Free	30 June 2024
16	Rod McDonald	CB	(England)	Liverpool	11 April 1992 (age 34)	Crewe Alexandra	1 July 2023	Free	30 June 2025
23	Matty Foulds	LB	(England)	Bradford	1 February 1998 (age 28)	Bradford City	14 June 2023	Undisclosed	30 June 2025
30	Liam Gibson	LB	(England)	Stanley	25 April 1997 (age 29)	Morecambe	1 July 2023	Free	30 June 2025
Midfielders
4	Josh Falkingham	CM	(England)	Leeds	25 August 1990 (age 36)	Darlington	1 July 2017	Free	30 June 2025
7	George Thomson	RM	(England)	Melton Mowbray	19 May 1992 (age 34)	FC United of Manchester	1 July 2017	Free	30 June 2025
8	Dean Cornelius	CM	(Scotland)	Bellshill	11 April 2001 (age 25)	(Scotland) Motherwell	1 July 2023	Free	30 June 2025
10	Matty Daly	AM	(England)	Stockport	10 March 2001 (age 25)	Huddersfield Town	1 July 2023	Free	30 June 2025
14	Toby Sims	RM	(England)	Worksop	15 October 1998 (age 28)	(United States) Pittsburgh Riverhounds	5 January 2023	Free	30 June 2025
17	Levi Sutton	DM	(England)	Scunthorpe	24 March 1997 (age 29)	Bradford City	31 January 2023	Undisclosed	30 June 2024
19	Jeremy Sivi	RM	(England)	London	18 July 2002 (age 24)	Middlesbrough	1 September 2023	Loan	31 May 2024
22	Stephen Dooley	RM	(Northern Ireland)	Ballymoney	19 October 1991 (age 35)	Rochdale	1 July 2022	Free	30 June 2024
25	George Horbury	CM	(England)	Harrogate	23 June 2004 (age 22)	Academy	1 July 2022	Trainee	30 June 2024
Forwards
9	Abraham Odoh	LW	(England)	Lambeth	7 August 2000 (age 26)	Rochdale	5 July 2023	Free	30 June 2025
12	Sam Folarin	RW	(England)	Lambeth	23 September 2000 (age 26)	Middlesbrough	1 September 2022	Undisclosed	30 June 2024
18	Jack Muldoon	CF	(England)	Scunthorpe	19 May 1989 (age 37)	AFC Fylde	1 July 2018	Free	30 June 2025
24	Josh March	CF	(England)	Stourbridge	18 March 1997 (age 29)	Stevenage	1 September 2023	Undisclosed	30 June 2025
27	Tom Bloxham	CF	(Republic of Ireland)	(England) Welwyn Garden City	30 April 2005 (age 21)	Blackburn Rovers	1 February 2024	Loan	31 May 2024
Out on Loan
11	James Daly	CF	(England)	Brighton	12 January 2000 (age 26)	Woking	1 July 2023	Free	30 June 2025
21	Peter Jameson	GK	(England)	Sunderland	21 April 1993 (age 33)	York City	1 July 2022	Free	30 June 2024
33	Emmanuel Ilesanmi	CF	(England)		17 November 2004 (age 21)	Academy	1 July 2023	Trainee	30 June 2024
34	Bradley Williams	CM	(England)		3 September 2004 (age 22)	Academy	1 July 2021	Trainee	30 June 2024
37	Finn O'Boyle	CF	(England)			Academy	30 August 2023	Trainee	30 June 2024

== Transfers ==
=== In ===
Date	Pos	Player	Transferred from	Fee	Ref
14 June 2023	LB	(England) Matty Foulds	(England) Bradford City	Undisclosed	
1 July 2023	CM	(Scotland) Dean Cornelius	(Scotland) Motherwell	Free Transfer	
1 July 2023	CF	(England) James Daly	(England) Woking	Free Transfer	
1 July 2023	AM	(England) Matty Daly	(England) Huddersfield Town	Free Transfer	
1 July 2023	LB	(England) Liam Gibson	(England) Morecambe	Free Transfer	
1 July 2023	CB	(England) Rod McDonald	(England) Crewe Alexandra	Free Transfer	
1 July 2023	GK	(England) Lewis Thomas	(England) Burnley	Free Transfer	
5 July 2023	LW	(England) Abraham Odoh	(England) Rochdale	Free Transfer	
1 September 2023	CF	(England) Josh March	(England) Stevenage	Undisclosed	
3 November 2023	GK	(England) Jonathan Mitchell	Free agent	—N/a	
11 January 2024	GK	(England) James Belshaw	(England) Bristol Rovers	Undisclosed	

=== Out ===
Date	Pos	Player	Transferred to	Fee	Ref
24 June 2023	CB	(Scotland) Kyle Ferguson	(England) Rochdale	Undisclosed	
30 June 2023	CF	(England) Dior Angus	(England) Altrincham	Released	
30 June 2023	CB	(Northern Ireland) Rory McArdle	Retired		
30 June 2023	CM	(England) Alex Pattison	(England) Bradford City	Released	
30 June 2023	RW	(England) Max Wright	(England) FC Halifax Town	Released	
31 December 2023	CM	(England) Benjamin Tweed	Free agent	Released	
31 December 2023	CB	(England) Mason Wilson	Free agent	Released	
1 January 2024	CF	(England) Luke Armstrong	(England) Carlisle United	Undisclosed	
1 February 2024	RB	(England) Kayne Ramsay	(England) Charlton Athletic	Undisclosed	

=== Loaned in ===
Date	Pos	Player	Loaned from	Until	Ref
1 September 2023	RM	(England) Jeremy Sivi	(England) Middlesbrough	End of season (Note: On 10 January, Sivi's loan from Middlesbrough was extended until the end of season.)	
15 December 2023	GK	(England) James Belshaw	(England) Bristol Rovers	12 January 2024 (Note: On 22 December, Belshaw's loan was extended by a further seven days.) (Note: On 5 January, Belshaw's loan was extended by a further more seven days.)	
1 February 2024	RB	(England) Derrick Abu	(England) Southampton	End of Season	
1 February 2024	LW	(Republic of Ireland) Tom Bloxham	(England) Blackburn Rovers	End of Season	

=== Loaned out ===
Date	Pos	Player	Loaned to	Date until	Ref
4 July 2023	GK	(England) Peter Jameson	(England) Hartlepool United	End of Season	
4 August 2023	CB	(England) Mason Wilson	(England) Farsley Celtic	31 August 2023	
18 August 2023	CM	(England) Benjamin Tweed	(England) Brighouse Town	15 September 2023	
19 August 2023	CF	(England) Emmanuel Ilesanmi	(England) Basford United	16 September 2023	
23 October 2023	LB	(England) Joe Mattock	(England) Harrogate Town	7 January 2024	
21 November 2023	CM	(England) George Horbury	(England) Buxton	19 December 2023	
8 December 2023	CM	(England) Bradley Williams	(England) Darlington	6 January 2024	
30 December 2023	CF	(England) Emmanuel Ilesanmi	(England) Spennymoor Town	27 January 2024	
12 January 2024	CM	(England) Bradley Williams	(England) Bradford (Park Avenue)	10 February 2024	
26 January 2024	CF	(England) Finn O'Boyle	(England) Gloucester City	24 February 2024	
1 February 2024	CF	(England) James Daly	(England) Aldershot Town	End of Season	

== Pre-season and friendlies ==
On 5 June, Harrogate Town announced their pre-season schedule with four fixtures confirmed against Darlington, South Shields, Gateshead and Hartlepool United.

Win Draw Loss Fixtures

8 July 2023 Friendly	Harrogate Town	1–0	Huddersfield Town B	Canalside Sports Complex
15:00 BST	O'Connor 76'	Report		Attendance: 0 Behind closed doors

15 July 2023 Friendly	Darlington	0–2	Harrogate Town	Darlington
15:00 BST		Report	Odoh 55'; Armstrong	Stadium: Blackwell Meadows; Attendance: 519

18 July 2023 Friendly	Lincoln City	3–1	Harrogate Town	Lincoln
14:00 BST	Bishop (x2); Hackett-Fairchild	Report	Cornelius 10'	Stadium: Elite Performance Centre; Attendance: 0 (behind closed doors)

22 July 2023 Friendly	South Shields	1–6	Harrogate Town	Jarrow
15:00 BST	Blackett 17'	Report	Armstrong 2', 11', 12', 40'; Muldoon 67'; Cornelius 82'	Stadium: Mariners Park; Attendance: 1,007

25 July 2023 Friendly	Gateshead	2–0	Harrogate Town	Gateshead
19:30 BST	Hunter 73'; Trialist 80'	Report		Stadium: Gateshead International Stadium

28 July 2023 Friendly	Hartlepool United	1–2	Harrogate Town	Hartlepool
19:30 BST	Mancini 55'	Report	Armstrong 24'; Odoh 81'	Stadium: Victoria Park; Attendance: 1,242

== Competitions ==
=== Overall record ===
Competition	Starting round	Final position	Record							
Competition	Starting round	Final position	Pld	W	D	L	GF	GA	GD	Win %
League Two	Matchday 1	13th	46	17	12	17	60	69	−9	36.96
FA Cup	First round	second round	2	1	0	1	6	6	+0	50.00
EFL Cup	First round	Second round	2	1	0	1	1	8	−7	50.00
EFL Trophy	Group stage	Group stage	3	1	0	2	5	8	−3	33.33
Total			53	20	12	21	72	91	−19	37.74

Last updated: 1 May 2024
Source: Soccerway

=== League Two ===
==== League table ====
Pos	Team	Pld	W	D	L	GF	GA	GD	Pts
10	AFC Wimbledon	46	17	14	15	64	51	+13	65
11	Walsall	46	18	11	17	69	73	−4	65
12	Gillingham	46	18	10	18	46	57	−11	64
13	Harrogate Town	46	17	12	17	60	69	−9	63
14	Notts County	46	18	7	21	89	86	+3	61
15	Morecambe	46	17	10	19	67	81	−14	58 (Note: On 11 April 2024, Morecambe were deducted three points for failing to pay players and staff on time following previous EFL rules breaches in the 2023–24 season.)
16	Tranmere Rovers	46	17	6	23	67	70	−3	57

Source: EFL Official Website
Rules for classification: 1) Points; 2) Goal difference; 3) Number of goals scored; 4) Head-to-head results; 5) Wins; 6) Away goals; 7) Penalty points (sec 9.5); 8) 12-point sending off offences

==== Results summary ====
Overall								Home						Away					
Pld	W	D	L	GF	GA	GD	Pts	W	D	L	GF	GA	GD	W	D	L	GF	GA	GD
46	17	12	17	60	69	−9	63	9	4	11	37	39	−2	8	8	6	23	30	−7

Last updated: 1 May 2024.
Source: Soccerway

==== Results by round ====
Round	1	2	3	4	5	6	7	8	9	10	11	12	13	14	15	16	17	18	19	20	22	23	24	25	26	27	28	21^{1}	31	32	33	34	35	30^{3}	36	37	38	39	40	41	42	43	29^{2}	44	45	46
Ground	A	H	A	A	H	H	A	A	H	A	H	A	H	A	H	H	A	H	A	H	H	A	H	H	A	H	A	A	A	H	A	A	H	H	A	H	A	A	H	A	H	A	H	H	H	A
Result	W	L	L	L	W	L	L	D	W	W	L	W	L	W	L	L	W	D	L	D	W	W	W	L	D	W	W	W	D	W	L	D	L	L	D	L	D	D	W	D	W	L	W	D	L	D
Position	9	12	21	21	17	19	21	20	18	16	19	15	17	14	17	18	14	14	15	16	16	14	12	15	14	13	9	8	8	7	8	7	13	13	12	13	14	13	13	13	12	13	11	12	13	13

Updated to match(es) played on 27 April 2024. Source: Soccerway
A = Away; H = Home; W = Win; D = Draw; L = Loss; P = Postponed
Notes:
- ^{1} Matchday 21 (vs Sutton United) was postponed due a waterlogged pitch.
- ^{2} Matchday 29 (vs Grimsby Town) was postponed due to a frozen pitch.
- ^{3} Matchday 30 (vs Newport County) was postponed due to Newport's FA Cup involvement.

==== Matches ====
On 22 June, the EFL League Two fixtures were released.

Win Draw Loss Fixtures

5 August 2023 1	Doncaster Rovers	0–1	Harrogate Town	Doncaster
15:00 BST	Lawlor (yellow card) 65'	Report	Folarin (yellow card) 53'; Muldoon 66' (pen.); Gibson (yellow card) 75'; O'Connor (yellow card) 90+7'; Odoh (yellow card) 90+8'	Stadium: Eco-Power Stadium; Attendance: 7,126; Referee: Scott Tallis

12 August 2023 2	Harrogate Town	0–1	Forest Green Rovers	Harrogate
15:00 BST	Cornelius (yellow card) 55'	Report	Jones (yellow card) 34'; Stevens 46'; Maddox (yellow card) 62'; Bernard (yellow card) 82'	Stadium: Wetherby Road; Attendance: 2,050; Referee: Leigh Doughty

15 August 2023 3	Tranmere Rovers	3–0	Harrogate Town	Birkenhead
19:45 BST	Norris 24' (yellow card) 53'; Taylor 26'; Leake (yellow card) 70'; Morris 89'	Report	Mattock (yellow card) 54'	Stadium: Prenton Park; Attendance: 5,278; Referee: Lee Swabey

19 August 2023 4	Accrington Stanley	2–1	Harrogate Town	Accrington
15:00 BST	Rich-Baghuelou (yellow card) 3'; McConville 28' (yellow card) 46'; Quirk (yellow card) 71' (yellow-red card) 82'; Coyle (yellow card) 87'; Conneely (yellow card) 90+7'; Nolan 90+8'	Report	Folarin (yellow card) 27'; Daly (yellow card) 34'; Mattock (yellow card) 45'; Burrell 83'; Falkingham (yellow card) 90+5'	Stadium: Crown Ground; Attendance: 1,950; Referee: Scott Simpson

26 August 2023 5	Harrogate Town	2–0	Morecambe	Harrogate
15:00 BST	Armstrong 20' (pen.); Sutton (yellow card) 47'; Thomson 66'; Falkingham (yellow card) 82'; Oxley (yellow card) 83'	Report	Rawson (yellow card) 20' (yellow-red card) 64'; Bedeau (yellow card) 20'; Mayor (yellow card) 45+4'; Love (yellow card) 90+1'	Stadium: Wetherby Road; Attendance: 2,224; Referee: Ross Joyce

2 September 2023 6	Harrogate Town	0–1	Barrow	Harrogate
15:00 BST	Ramsay (yellow card) 36'; Muldoon (penalty missed) 61'; O'Connor (yellow card) 72'	Report	Spence 21'; Telford (yellow card) 28'; White (yellow card) 59'	Stadium: Wetherby Road; Attendance: 1,968; Referee: Scott Jackson

9 September 2023 7	Gillingham	1–0	Harrogate Town	Gillingham
15:00 BST	J. Williams (yellow card) 35'; S. Williams (yellow card) 59' (goal) 90+5'; Masterson (yellow card) 64'	Report	Ramsay (yellow card) 61'	Stadium: Priestfield Stadium; Attendance: 5,778; Referee: Neil Hair

16 September 2023 8	Bradford City	1–1	Harrogate Town	Bradford
15:00 BST	Walker 90+5'	Report	Odoh (yellow card) 33'; Daly 78'; Oxley (yellow card) 90+2'	Stadium: Valley Parade; Attendance: 17,283; Referee: Sunny Gill

23 September 2023 9	Harrogate Town	3–2	Salford City	Harrogate
15:00 BST	Thomson 16' (pen.); Folarin 23'; McDonald (yellow card) 74'; Odoh 80'; Sutton (yellow card) 84'	Report	Watt (yellow card) 18'; Tilt 29'; Smith 58'; McAleny (yellow card) 66'	Stadium: Wetherby Road; Attendance: 2,303; Referee: Ben Atkinson

30 September 2023 10	Milton Keynes Dons	0–1	Harrogate Town	Denbigh
15:00 BST	Williams (yellow card) 54'; Ilunga (yellow card) 90+5'; Dean (yellow card) 90+6'	Report	O'Hora 40' (o.g.); Oxley (yellow card) 43'	Stadium: Stadium MK; Attendance: 5,251; Referee: Martin Coy

3 October 2023 11	Harrogate Town	0–1	AFC Wimbledon	Harrogate
19:45 BST	Gibson (yellow card) 79'; McDonald (yellow card) 88'	Report	Bugiel 6'; Little (yellow card) 83'; Pell (yellow card) 90+1'	Stadium: Wetherby Road; Attendance: 2,066; Referee: Peter Wright

7 October 2023 12	Newport County	1–2	Harrogate Town	Newport
15:00 BST	Evans 58'	Report	Thomson 42'; O'Connor 52'	Stadium: Rodney Parade; Attendance: 3,357; Referee: Rebecca Welch

14 October 2023 13	Harrogate Town	1–3	Stockport County	Harrogate
15:00 BST	Thomson 73' (pen.)	Report	Sarcevic 14'; Croasdale (yellow card) 30'; Burrell 50' (o.g.); Collar 69'	Stadium: Wetherby Road; Attendance: 2,360; Referee: Thomas Parsons

21 October 2023 14	Colchester United	1–2	Harrogate Town	Colchester
15:00 GMT	Cooper 62'; Greenidge (yellow card) 72'	Report	Daly 65'; Folarin 80'	Stadium: Colchester Community Stadium; Attendance: 3,132; Referee: Paul Howard

24 October 2023 15	Harrogate Town	1–4	Mansfield Town	Harrogate
19:45 GMT	Ramsay (yellow card) 66'; Sutton 80'	Report	Brunt 8' (yellow card) 90+1'; Akins 36', 38'; Macdonald (yellow card) 69'; Maris 73'; Johnson (yellow card) 83'	Stadium: Wetherby Road; Attendance: 2,304; Referee: Stephen Martin

28 October 2023 16	Harrogate Town	0–1	Crewe Alexandra	Harrogate
15:00 GMT	Sutton (yellow card) 45'; Folarin (yellow card) 90+3'; McDonald (yellow card) 90+6'	Report	Williams 31'	Stadium: Wetherby Road; Attendance: 2,244; Referee: Declan Bourne

11 November 2023 17	Walsall	0–1	Harrogate Town	Bescot
15:00 GMT		Report	Sutton (yellow card) 52'; Falkingham (yellow card) 82'; Thomson 84'	Stadium: Bescot Stadium; Attendance: 4,654; Referee: Matthew Corlett

18 November 2023 18	Harrogate Town	1–1	Swindon Town	Harrogate
15:00 GMT	Muldoon 66'; Dooley (yellow card) 82'	Report	Young 25'; Kinsella (yellow card) 27'; Kokolo (yellow card) 81'	Stadium: Wetherby Road; Attendance: 3,004; Referee: Jacob Miles

25 November 2023 19	Crawley Town	2–1	Harrogate Town	Crawley
15:00 GMT	Gladwin 23'; Williams (yellow card) 61'; Lolos 71'; Kelly (yellow card) 79'; Adeyemo (yellow card) 90+3'	Report	Muldoon 45+6'; McDonald (yellow card) 84'; March (yellow card) 88'; Dooley (yellow card) 90+2'	Stadium: Broadfield Stadium; Attendance: 2,829; Referee: Carl Brook

28 November 2023 20	Harrogate Town	2–2	Wrexham	Harrogate
19:45 GMT	March (yellow card) 22'; Cornelius 45' (yellow card) 45+4'; O'Connor 47'	Report	Cannon 36'; Lee 41'; Tozer (yellow card) 63'; Hayden (yellow card) 90+3'	Stadium: Wetherby Road; Attendance: 3,767; Referee: Martin Woods

16 December 2023 22	Harrogate Town	3–1	Notts County	Harrogate
15:00 GMT	Thomson 7'; Cornelius (yellow card) 26'; Odoh 32'; Ramsay (yellow card) 65'; Daly 68'	Report	O'Brien (yellow card) 51'; Chicksen (yellow card) 54'; Baldwin (yellow card) 57'; Jones 67'	Stadium: Wetherby Road; Attendance: 2,914; Referee: Scott Tallis

23 December 2023 23	Grimsby Town	1–2	Harrogate Town	Cleethorpes
15:00 GMT	Green 90+1'; Driscoll-Glennon (yellow card) 90+3'	Report	Foulds 41'; Odoh 72'; March (yellow card) 90+4'	Stadium: Blundell Park; Attendance: 6,302; Referee: Adam Herczeg

26 December 2023 24	Harrogate Town	2–1	Accrington Stanley	Harrogate
15:00 GMT	Muldoon 63'; Thomson 90+3'	Report	Nolan 57'	Stadium: Wetherby Road; Attendance: 3,515; Referee: Ben Speedie

29 December 2023 25	Harrogate Town	0–2	Tranmere Rovers	Harrogate
19:45 GMT	Gibson (yellow card) 64'	Report	Jolley 54'; Davies 70'; McAlear (yellow card) 80'; McGee (yellow card) 83'	Stadium: Wetherby Road; Attendance: 3,105; Referee: Tom Reeves

1 January 2024 24	Morecambe	2–2	Harrogate Town	Morecambe
15:00 GMT	Slew 57', (yellow card) 87'; Bedeau 90+2'; Songo'o (yellow card) 90+3'; Rawson (yellow card) 90+4'	Report	Muldoon 44'; Thomson 83'; Belshaw (yellow card) 90+3'; Burrell (yellow card) 90+4'	Stadium: Mazuma Stadium; Attendance: 3,776; Referee: Simon Mather

6 January 2024 27	Harrogate Town	3–1	Doncaster Rovers	Harrogate
15:00 GMT	Folarin 17'; Daly 66'; Odoh 74'		Rowe 19'; Sterry (yellow card) 38'; Nixon (yellow card) 77'; Olowu (yellow card) 85'	Stadium: Wetherby Road; Attendance: 1,017; Referee: Sam Purkiss

13 January 2024 28	Forest Green Rovers	0–2	Harrogate Town	Nailsworth
15:00 GMT	Simkin (yellow card) 31'; Rodríguez (yellow card) 41' (yellow-red card) 48'; Taylor (yellow card) 90+4'	Report	Muldoon 51' (yellow card) 56'; Odoh 69'; Falkingham (yellow card) 80'	Stadium: The New Lawn; Attendance: 1,695; Referee: Christopher Pollard

30 January 2024 21	Sutton United	1–2	Harrogate Town	Sutton
19:45 GMT	Kizzi (yellow card) 81'; Jackson 87'	Report	Dooley (yellow card) 33'; Burrell (yellow card) 52'; Muldoon 58', 75'; Sutton (yellow card) 67'	Stadium: Gander Green Lane; Attendance: 2,482; Referee: Stephen Parkinson
Note: Fixture was originally scheduled for 9 December, but was postponed due to a waterlogged pitch.

3 February 2024 31	Stockport County	1–1	Harrogate Town	Edgeley
15:00 GMT	Lemonheigh-Evans 30'; Wright (yellow card) 63'; Sarcevic (yellow card) 85'; Horsfall (yellow card) 90+4'	Report	Cornelius 16'; Belshaw (yellow card) 51'	Stadium: Edgeley Park; Attendance: 9,325; Referee: Ben Toner

10 February 2024 32	Harrogate Town	1–0	Colchester United	Harrogate
15:00 GMT	O'Connor (yellow card) 90+1'; Muldoon 90+2'	Report	Harbottle (yellow card) 28'; McGeehan (yellow card) 39'; Goodman (yellow card) 57'	Stadium: Wetherby Road; Attendance: 2,706; Referee: Tom Nield

13 February 2024 33	Mansfield Town	9–2	Harrogate Town	Mansfield
19:45 GMT	Akins 13' (pen.), 61'; Boateng (yellow card) 13', (goal) 20', 30', 50'; Nichols 34'; Keillor-Dunn 39'; Swan 75', 77'	Report	Thomson 54'; Odoh 55'	Stadium: Field Mill; Attendance: 6,437; Referee: Scott Oldham

17 February 2024 34	Crewe Alexandra	0–0	Harrogate Town	Crewe
15:00 GMT		Report	Cornelius (yellow card) 7'; Abu (yellow card) 42'; Thomson (yellow card) 67'	Stadium: Gresty Road; Attendance: 4,421; Referee: David Rock

24 February 2024 35	Harrogate Town	0–2	Walsall	Harrogate
15:00 GMT		Report	Gordon 48' (yellow card) 85'; Earing (yellow card) 67'; Faal 84'	Stadium: Wetherby Road; Attendance: 3,167; Referee: Alex Chilowicz

26 January 2024 30	Harrogate Town	1–4	Newport County	Harrogate
19:45 GMT	Thomson 78'	Report	Evans 31' (pen.); Zanzala 33', 52'; Palmer-Houlden 70'	Stadium: EnviroVent Stadium; Attendance: 2,006; Referee: Ruebyn Ricardo
Note: Fixture was originally scheduled for 26 January, but was postponed due to Newport's FA Cup involvement.

2 March 2024 36	Swindon Town	1–1	Harrogate Town	Swindon
15:00 GMT	Austin 85'; Devoy (yellow card) 88'	Report	O'Connor 52'; Cornelius (yellow card) 55'	Stadium: The County Ground; Attendance: 7,687; Referee: Leigh Doughty

9 March 2024 37	Harrogate Town	1–2	Crawley Town	Harrogate
15:00 GMT	Thomson 26'; Cornelius (yellow card) 45+2'	Report	Gordon (yellow card) 45'; Forster 58'; Lolos 66'	Stadium: Wetherby Road; Attendance: 2,124; Referee: Darren Drysdale

12 March 2024 38	Wrexham	0–0	Harrogate Town	Wrexham
19:45 GMT	McClean (yellow card) 73'	Report	Odoh (yellow card) 39'; O'Connor (yellow card) 61'	Stadium: SToK Cae Ras; Attendance: 12,018; Referee: Matthew Corlett

16 March 2024 39	Barrow	0–0	Harrogate Town	Barrow-in-Furness
15:00 GMT	Campbell (penalty missed) 26'; Warren (yellow card) 90'	Report	Dooley (yellow card) 86'	Stadium: Holker Street; Attendance: 3,472; Referee: Edward Duckworth

23 March 2024 40	Harrogate Town	3–0	Bradford City	Harrogate
13:00 GMT	March 21'; Dooley (yellow card) 57'; Thomson 73' (pen.); Oyegoke 79' (o.g.)	Report	Wright (yellow card) 74'	Stadium: Wetherby Road; Attendance: 3,905; Referee: Sam Purkiss

29 March 2024 41	AFC Wimbledon	1–1	Harrogate Town	Wimbledon
15:00 GMT	Balmer (yellow card) 52'; Curtis 58' (red card) 61'	Report	Daly 8'; March (yellow card) 52'	Stadium: Plough Lane; Attendance: 8,080; Referee: Ben Speedie

1 April 2024 42	Harrogate Town	5–1	Gillingham	Harrogate
15:00 BST	Dooley (yellow card) 15'; March (yellow card) 55'; O'Connor 60'; Daly 68', 70'; Sutton (yellow card) 72'; Muldoon 90+3'; Odoh 90+5'	Report	Lapslie 41'; Hutton (yellow card) 59'; Andrews (yellow card) 90+6'	Stadium: Wetherby Road; Attendance: 3,133; Referee: Simon Mather

6 April 2024 43	Notts County	3–0	Harrogate Town	Nottingham
15:00 BST	Langstaff 45+2' (pen.); Cameron (yellow card) 48'; Baldwin (yellow card) 56'; Jones 75'; O'Brien (yellow card) 80' (goal) 89'	Report	Thomson (yellow card) 45+5' (penalty missed) 57'	Stadium: Meadow Lane; Attendance: 9,169; Referee: Jacob Miles

9 April 2024 29	Harrogate Town	1–0	Grimsby Town	Harrogate
19:45 BST	Thomson 49'; Abu (yellow card) 83'	Report	Hume (yellow card) 79'	Stadium: Wetherby Road; Attendance: 3,201; Referee: Thomas Parsons
Note: Fixture was originally scheduled for 20 January, but was postponed due to a frozen pitch.

13 April 2024 44	Harrogate Town	2–2	Sutton United	Harrogate
15:00 BST	Foulds (yellow card) 34'; Thomson 49'; Muldoon 80'	Report	Eastmond (yellow card) 20'; Beautyman 45+1'; Moore 87'; Hart (yellow card) 90+3'	Stadium: Wetherby Road; Attendance: 2,526; Referee: Adam Herczeg

20 April 2024 45	Harrogate Town	3–5	Milton Keynes Dons	Harrogate
15:00 BST	Odoh 33'; Thomson 45+2', 50'	Report	Gilbey 40'; Dean 43'; Wearne 52'; Tezgel 80'; Harrison 83'	Stadium: Wetherby Road; Attendance: 3,573; Referee: David Webb

27 April 2024 46	Salford City	2–2	Harrogate Town	Kersal
15:00 BST	Hendry 5'; Watson 33'	Report	Mcdonald (yellow card) 17'; Odoh 27'; Sims (yellow card) 34'; Folds 45+2'	Stadium: Moor Lane; Attendance: 2,922; Referee: David Rock

=== FA Cup ===
Harrogate were drawn away to Marine in the first round and to Bolton Wanderers in the second round.

Win Draw Loss Fixtures

4 November 2023 First round	Marine	1–5	Harrogate Town	Crosby
15:00 GMT	Doyle 26'; Woodthorpe (yellow card) 90+3'	Report	Odoh 5'; Folarin 28', 53'; McDonald 71'; Dooley 89'	Stadium: Rossett Park; Attendance: 2,071; Referee: Michael Barlow

2 December 2023 Second round	Bolton Wanderers	5–1	Harrogate Town	Horwich
15:00 GMT	Böðvarsson 9', 33', 43'; Nlundulu 49', 52'; Mendes Gomes (yellow card) 64'; Jones (yellow card) 81'	Report	Thomson 45' (yellow card) 75'	Stadium: Toughsheet Community Stadium; Attendance: 5,703; Referee: Tony Harrington

=== EFL Cup ===
Harrogate were drawn at home to Carlisle United in the first round and to Blackburn Rovers in the second round.

Win Draw Loss Fixtures

8 August 2023 First round	Harrogate Town	1–0	Carlisle United	Harrogate
19:45 BST	Folarin 23'	Report	Edmondson (penalty missed) 76'	Stadium: Wetherby Road; Attendance: 2,177; Referee: Matthew Corlett

30 August 2023 Second round	Harrogate Town	0–8	Blackburn Rovers	Harrogate
19:45 BST		Report	Garrett 10' (yellow card) 22'; Gallagher 13'; Buckley 34', 52' (pen.); Markanday 45+1'; Gilsenan 67'; Bloxham 72'; Edmondson 75' (yellow card) 90+3'	Stadium: Wetherby Road; Attendance: 2,653; Referee: Will Finnie

=== EFL Trophy ===
The Group stage draw was finalised on 22 June 2023.

Pos	Div	Team	Pld	W	PW	PL	L	GF	GA	GD	Pts	Qualification
1	L2	Accrington Stanley	3	2	0	0	1	7	5	+2	6	Advance to Round 2
2	ACA	Nottingham Forest U21	3	2	0	0	1	5	3	+2	6	Advance to Round 2
3	L1	Carlisle United	3	1	0	0	2	2	3	−1	3	
4	L2	Harrogate Town	3	1	0	0	2	5	8	−3	3	

Updated to match(es) played on 14 November 2023. Source: EFL.com

Win Draw Loss Fixtures

5 September 2023 Group stage	Harrogate Town	2–1	Nottingham Forest U21	Harrogate
19:45 BST	Thomson 56' (pen.); O'Connor 82'	Report	Hanks (yellow card) 55'; Perry (yellow card) 71'; Esapa Osong 84' (yellow card) 88'; Collins (yellow card) 85'	Stadium: Wetherby Road; Attendance: 1,178; Referee: Edward Duckworth

10 October 2023 Group stage	Harrogate Town	3–5	Accrington Stanley	Harrogate
19:45 BST	Folarin 35', 76'; Mattock 58'	Report	Trickett 27', 89'; Adedoyin 30', 37', 51'; Shipley (yellow card) 61'; Rich-Baghuelou (yellow card) 74'	Stadium: Wetherby Road; Attendance: 959; Referee: Marc Edwards

14 November 2023 Group stage	Carlisle United	2–0	Harrogate Town	Carlisle
19:00 GMT	Gibson 3', 79'; Garner (yellow card) 42'	Report		Stadium: Brunton Park; Attendance: 716; Referee: Dale Baines
