= 2022–23 Harrogate Town A.F.C. season =

Harrogate Town AFC
2022–23 season
- Chairman: Irving Weaver
- Manager: Simon Weaver
- Stadium: Wetherby Road
- League Two: 19th
- FA Cup: Second round
- EFL Cup: First round
- EFL Trophy: Group stage

The 2022–23 Harrogate Town A.F.C. season was the one hundred and ninth season of the football club and the club's third consecutive season in League Two. Outside the league, they contested the 2022–23 FA Cup, the 2022–23 EFL Cup and the 2022–23 EFL Trophy.

== Transfers ==
=== In ===
Date	Pos	Player	Transferred from	Fee	Ref
1 July 2022 (Note: The transfer was announced on 14 June, and would become official on July 1, once his Rochdale contract expired)	LM	(Northern Ireland) Stephen Dooley	(England) Rochdale	Free Transfer	
1 July 2022 (Note: The transfer was announced on 13 June, and would become official on July 1, once his Altrincham contract expired)	CB	(Scotland) Kyle Ferguson	(England) Altrincham	Free Transfer	
1 July 2022 (Note: The transfer was announced on 30 May, and would become official on July 1, once his York City contract expired)	GK	(England) Pete Jameson	(England) York City	Free Transfer	
1 July 2022 (Note: The transfer was announced on 21 June, and would become official on July 1, once his Rotherham United contract expired)	LB	(England) Joe Mattock	(England) Rotherham United	Free Transfer	
1 July 2022 (Note: The transfer was announced on 29 June, and would become official on July 1, once his Colchester United contract expired)	RB	(England) Miles Welch-Hayes	(England) Colchester United	Free Transfer	
20 July 2022	RW	(England) Max Wright	(England) Grimsby Town	Free Transfer	
28 July 2022	RM	(England) Tyler Frost	(England) Crawley Town	Free Transfer	
13 August 2022	RB	(England) Kayne Ramsay	(England) Southampton	Undisclosed	
1 September 2022	RW	(England) Sam Folarin	(England) Middlesbrough	Undisclosed	
5 January 2023	RM	(England) Toby Sims	(United States) Pittsburgh Riverhounds	Free Transfer	
11 January 2023	CB	(Republic of Ireland) Anthony O'Connor	(England) Morecambe	Free Transfer	
31 January 2023	DM	(England) Levi Sutton	(England) Bradford City	Undisclosed	

=== Out ===
Date	Pos	Player	Transferred to	Fee	Ref
29 June 2022	DM	(England) Nathan Sheron	(England) Oldham Athletic	Undisclosed	
30 June 2022	CF	(Scotland) Mark Beck	(England) Darlington	Released	
30 June 2022	GK	(England) Joe Cracknell	(England) Scarborough Athletic	Released	
30 June 2022	RB	(England) Ryan Fallowfield	(England) York City	Released	
30 June 2022	RM	(England) Lloyd Kerry	Retired		
30 June 2022	CM	(England) Connor Kirby	(England) Buxton	Released	
30 June 2022	LB	(England) Joe Leesley	(England) Boston United	Released	
30 June 2022	LB	(England) Lewis Page	(England) Mansfield Town	Released	
30 June 2022	RM	(Republic of Ireland) Simon Power	(Republic of Ireland) Shamrock Rovers	Released	
1 July 2022 (Note: The transfer was announced on 17 June, and would become official on July 1, once the transfer window re-opened)	CF	(England) Danilo Orsi	(England) Grimsby Town	Free transfer	
9 July 2022	CF	(England) Aaron Martin	(England) Gateshead	Free transfer	
25 January 2023	RM	(England) Tyler Frost	(England) Aldershot Town	Released	

=== Loans in ===
Date	Pos	Player	Loaned from	On loan until	Ref
21 June 2022	AM	(England) Josh Austerfield	(England) Huddersfield Town	31 January 2023 (Note: On 31 January, Austerfield was recalled to Huddersfield)	
21 June 2022	LB	(England) Jaheim Headley	(England) Huddersfield Town	9 January 2023 (Note: On 9 January, Headley was recalled to Huddersfield)	
27 June 2022	AM	(England) Matty Daly	(England) Huddersfield Town	End of Season	
8 July 2022	CB	(Republic of Ireland) Lewis Richards	(England) Wolverhampton Wanderers	3 January 2023 (Note: On 3 January, Richards returned early from his loan at Forest Green due to a season-ending injury)	
1 September 2022	AM	(England) Josh Coley	(England) Exeter City	10 January 2023 (Note: On 10 January, Coley was recalled to Exeter)	
1 September 2022	RW	(Republic of Ireland) Danny Grant	(England) Huddersfield Town	End of Season	
17 January 2023	LB	(England) Matty Foulds	(England) Bradford City	End of Season	
26 January 2023	CB	(England) Tom Eastman	(England) Colchester United	End of Season	
31 January 2023	LW	(Belgium) Kazeem Olaigbe	(England) Southampton	End of Season	

=== Loans out ===
Date	Pos	Player	Loaned to	On loan until	Ref
16 January 2023	FW	(England) Emmanuel Ilesanmi	(England) Scarborough Athletic	13 February 2023	
23 January 2023	RB	(England) Miles Welch-Hayes	(England) Altrincham	End of Season	
17 February 2023	CB	(England) Will Smith	(England) Scunthorpe United	End of Season (Note: On 20 March, Smith's loan at Scunthorpe was extended until the end of the season)	
3 March 2023	CB	(Scotland) Kyle Ferguson	(England) Altrincham	End of Season	
23 March 2023	RW	(England) Max Wright	(England) FC Halifax Town	End of Season	

== Pre-season and friendlies ==
On 8 June, Harrogate Town announced their first set of pre-season fixtures.

Win Draw Loss Fixtures

8 July 2022 Friendly	Harrogate Town	0–2	Sheffield Wednesday	Harrogate
19:00 BST		Report	Windass 8'; Smith 32' (pen.)	Stadium: EnviroVent Stadium; Attendance: 1,901; Referee: Oliver Langford

12 July 2022 Friendly	Harrogate Town	0–3	Rotherham United	Harrogate
19:00 BST		Report	Odoffin 9'; Barlaser 12'; McGuckin 76'	Stadium: EnviroVent Stadium; Attendance: 869; Referee: Tom Nield

16 July 2022 Friendly	Harrogate Town	1–0	Huddersfield Town	Harrogate
12:00 BST	Richards 20'			Stadium: EnviroVent Stadium

20 July 2022 Friendly	Harrogate Town	2–2	Barnsley	Harrogate
19:00 BST	Wright 11'; Pattison 72'	Report	Marsh 45'; Moon 58'	Stadium: EnviroVent Stadium; Referee: Ross Joyce

23 July 2022 Friendly	Gateshead	1–3	Harrogate Town	Gateshead
15:00 BST	Martin 61'	Report	Trialist 4'; Armstrong 40', 66'	Stadium: Gateshead International Stadium; Referee: Seb Stockbridge

== Competitions ==
=== Overall record ===
Competition	First match	Last match	Starting round	Record							
Competition	First match	Last match	Starting round	Pld	W	D	L	GF	GA	GD	Win %
League Two	August 2022	May 2023	Matchday 1	0	0	0	0	0	0	+0	—
FA Cup	TBC	TBC	Third round	0	0	0	0	0	0	+0	—
EFL Cup	TBC	TBC	First round	0	0	0	0	0	0	+0	—
EFL Trophy	TBC	TBC	Group stage	0	0	0	0	0	0	+0	—
Total				0	0	0	0	0	0	+0	—

Last updated: pre-season
Source: [ Soccerway]

=== League Two ===
==== League table ====
Pos	Team	Pld	W	D	L	GF	GA	GD	Pts
16	Walsall	46	12	19	15	46	49	−3	55
17	Gillingham	46	14	13	19	36	49	−13	55
18	Doncaster Rovers	46	16	7	23	46	65	−19	55
19	Harrogate Town	46	12	16	18	59	68	−9	52
20	Colchester United	46	12	13	21	44	51	−7	49
21	AFC Wimbledon	46	11	15	20	48	60	−12	48
22	Crawley Town	46	11	13	22	48	71	−23	46

Source: EFL Official Website
Rules for classification: 1) Points; 2) Goal difference; 3) Number of goals scored; 4) Head-to-head results; 5) Wins; 6) Away goals; 7) Penalty points (sec 9.5); 8) 12-point sending off offences

==== Results summary ====
Overall								Home						Away					
Pld	W	D	L	GF	GA	GD	Pts	W	D	L	GF	GA	GD	W	D	L	GF	GA	GD
45	12	15	18	58	67	−9	51	6	9	7	30	31	−1	6	6	11	28	36	−8

Last updated: 29 April 2023.
Source: [ Soccerway]

==== Results by round ====
Round	1	2	3	4	5	6	7	8	9	10	11	12	13	14	15	16	17	18	19	20	21	22	23	24	25	26	27	28	29	30	31	32	33	34	35	36	37	38	39	40	41	42	43	44	45
Ground	H	A	H	A	A	H	A	H	A	A	H	A	H	H	A	A	H	H	H	A	H	A	A	H	H	H	A	H	A	H	A	A	H	H	A	A	H	A	H	A	H	H	A	A	A
Result	W	L	D	W	L	L	L	L	D	L	D	L	W	D	L	L	D	L	W	W	W	L	D	L	D	L	W	L	D	D	D	L	D	D	W	L	W	D	D	D	D	W	L	W	W
Position	2	11	12	9	12	18	19	19	18	19	20	22	20	20	21	21	21	21	20	20	20	19	19	19	20	21	20	20	20	21	20	21	21	21	19	21	19	20	20	21	21	21	21	21	19

Updated to match(es) played on 29 April 2023. Source: [ Soccerway]
A = Away; H = Home; W = Win; D = Draw; L = Loss; P = Postponed

==== Matches ====
Win Draw Loss Fixtures

On 23 June, the league fixtures were announced.

30 July 2022 1	Harrogate Town	3–0	Swindon Town	Harrogate
15:00 BST	Burrell (yellow card) 10'; Dooley (yellow card) 28'; Pattison 43'; Daly 51'; Austerfield (yellow card) 61'; Muldoon 76'	Report	Gladwin (penalty missed) 66'	Stadium: The EnviroVent Stadium; Attendance: 1,948; Referee: Tom Reeves

6 August 2022 2	Crewe Alexandra	3–0	Harrogate Town	Crewe
15:00 BST	Agyei 44'; Mellor 45+3'; Sambou (yellow card) 65'; Baker-Richardson 77'; Uwakwe (yellow card) 81'	Report		Stadium: Mornflake Stadium; Attendance: 3,881; Referee: Declan Bourne

13 August 2022 3	Harrogate Town	0–0	Crawley Town	Harrogate
15:00 BST		Report		Stadium: The EnviroVent Stadium; Attendance: 1,304; Referee: Tom Nield

16 August 2022 4	Gillingham	0–2	Harrogate Town	Gillingham
19:45 BST	Adelakun (yellow card) 45'; Wright (yellow card) 52'; Baggott (yellow card) 69'; Reeves (yellow card) 71'; Lee (yellow card) 87'	Report	Mattock (yellow card) 5'; Daly 26'; Pattison (yellow card) 34', (goal) 86'; Ramsay (yellow card) 85'	Stadium: Priestfield Stadium; Attendance: 3,931; Referee: Lee Swabey

20 August 2022 5	Barrow	1–0	Harrogate Town	Barrow-in-Furness
15:00 BST	Kay (yellow card) 27'; Gordon 45'; Brough (yellow card) 81'; Waters (yellow card) 86'; Rooney (yellow card) 90+2'	Report	Mattock (yellow card) 17'; Ramsay (yellow card) 43'; Thomson (yellow card) 50'; Austerfield (yellow card) 90+2'	Stadium: Furness Building Society Stadium; Attendance: 3,068; Referee: Thomas Parsons

27 August 2022 6	Harrogate Town	0–4	Newport County	Harrogate
15:00 BST		Report	Bogle 4', 44'; Ramsay 9' (o.g.); Nevers 22'; Drysdale (yellow card) 47'; Waite (yellow card) 51'	Stadium: The EnviroVent Stadium; Attendance: 1,757; Referee: Carl Boyeson

3 September 2022 7	Sutton United	2–1	Harrogate Town	Sutton
15:00 BST	Beautyman 21'; Kouassi 70'; Rose (yellow card) 90+5'	Report	Richards (yellow card) 26'; Armstrong 45+2' (pen.); Austerfield (yellow card) 48'; Horbury (red card) 73'	Stadium: VBS Community Stadium; Attendance: 2,402; Referee: Neil Hair

10 September 2022	Harrogate Town	Postponed	Carlisle United	Harrogate
15:00 BST				Stadium: The EnviroVent Stadium
Note: Fixture was postponed as a mark of respect following the passing of Queen Elizabeth II.

13 September 2022 8	Harrogate Town	0–1	Salford City	Harrogate
19:45 BST	Coley (yellow card) 24'	Report	Leak (yellow card) 19'; Watt (yellow card) 53'; Touray (yellow card) 63'; Lund 90+3'	Stadium: The EnviroVent Stadium; Attendance: 1,350; Referee: Ben Toner

17 September 2022 9	Stockport County	0–0	Harrogate Town	Edgeley
15:00 BST	Croasdale (yellow card) 32'	Report	Folarin (yellow card) 49'; McArdle (yellow card) 66'; Austerfield (yellow card) 90+3'	Stadium: Edgeley Park; Attendance: 7,863; Referee: Ross Joyce

24 September 2022 10	Stevenage	1–0	Harrogate Town	Stevenage
15:00 BST	Vancooten (yellow card) 89'; Sweeney 90'	Report		Stadium: Lamex Stadium; Attendance: 2,547; Referee: Sam Allison

1 October 2022 11	Harrogate Town	1–2	Bradford City	Harrogate
13:00 BST	Folarin (yellow card) 17'; Headley 48'; McArdle (yellow card) 79'	Report	Cook 15' (pen.); Gilliead (yellow card) 53'; Wright 73'	Stadium: The EnviroVent Stadium; Attendance: 2,505; Referee: Peter Wright

8 October 2022 12	Colchester United	2–1	Harrogate Town	Colchester
15:00 BST	Appiah 8'; Nouble 37'; Skuse (yellow card) 52'; Chambers (yellow card) 82'; Lubala (yellow card) 90+1'	Report	Mattock (yellow card) 37'; Falkingham (yellow card) 48'; Pattison 57'; Burrell (yellow card) 74'	Stadium: JobServe Community Stadium; Attendance: 2,750; Referee: Craig Hicks

15 October 2022 13	Harrogate Town	2–1	Hartlepool United	Harrogate
12:30 BST	Pattison 25'; Muldoon 43'	Report	Umerah 85'	Stadium: The EnviroVent Stadium; Attendance: 2,075; Referee: Andrew Kitchen

22 October 2022 14	Harrogate Town	1–1	Tranmere Rovers	Harrogate
15:00 BST	Daly 37'; Headley (yellow card) 60'; Falkingham (yellow card) 83'; McArdle (yellow card) 90+4'	Report	Turnbull 56' (yellow card) 90+4'	Stadium: The EnviroVent Stadium; Attendance: 2,316; Referee: Ollie Yates

25 October 2022 15	Walsall	3–1	Harrogate Town	Bescot
19:45 BST	Johnson 14' (pen.); Gordon 18'; Hutchinson 34'	Report	McArdle (yellow card) 30'; Headley (yellow card) 38'; Daly 83'; Richards (yellow card) 88'	Stadium: Poundland Bescot Stadium; Attendance: 4,347; Referee: Robert Lewis

29 October 2022 16	AFC Wimbledon	3–2	Harrogate Town	Wimbledon
15:00 BST	Kalambayi 39'; Currie (yellow card) 72'; Hudlin (yellow card) 75'; Senior 84'; Davison 88'	Report	Daly 47'; Pattison 65'	Stadium: The Cherry Red Records Stadium; Attendance: 7,620; Referee: Paul Howard

8 November 2022 17	Harrogate Town	3–3	Carlisle United	Harrogate
19:45 GMT	Armstrong 28'; Burrell 60'; Headley 76'	Report	Charters 12'; Edmondson (yellow card) 42' (goal) 50'; Moxon 90+3'	Stadium: The EnviroVent Stadium; Attendance: 2,147; Referee: Thomas Kirk

12 November 2022 18	Harrogate Town	0–2	Leyton Orient	Harrogate
15:00 GMT	Headley (yellow card) 46'; Austerfield (yellow card) 86'	Report	Smyth 7'; Moncur 24' (pen.)	Stadium: The EnviroVent Stadium; Attendance: 2,330; Referee: Ben Speedie

19 November 2022 19	Harrogate Town	3–0	Mansfield Town	Harrogate
15:00 GMT	Falkingham (yellow card) 3'; Pattison 5'; Armstrong 19', 45+3'; Ramsay (yellow card) 49'; Mattock (yellow card) 58'	Report	O'Toole (yellow card) 26'; Wallace (yellow card) 29'	Stadium: The EnviroVent Stadium; Attendance: 2,421; Referee: Scott Oldham

3 December 2022 20	Rochdale	1–4	Harrogate Town	Rochdale
15:00 GMT	Ball 7'; Brierley (yellow card) 37'; Odoh (yellow card) 81'	Report	Thomson 14'; Ferguson (yellow card) 45'; Armstrong 53', 58'; Folarin 70'	Stadium: Spotland; Attendance: 2,254; Referee: Declan Bourne

10 December 2022	Harrogate Town	Postponed	Northampton Town	Harrogate
15:00 GMT				Stadium: The EnviroVent Stadium
Note: Fixture was postponed due to a frozen pitch.

17 December 2022	Doncaster Rovers	Postponed	Harrogate Town	Doncaster
15:00 GMT				Stadium: Eco-Power Stadium
Note: Fixture was postponed due to a frozen pitch.

26 December 2022 21	Harrogate Town	3–2	Grimsby Town	Harrogate
15:00 GMT	Armstrong 12', 76'; Burrell (yellow card) 31'; Ramsay (yellow card) 42'; Crocombe 90+1' (o.g.)	Report	Khan 29'; Green (yellow card) 42'; Clifton 49'	Stadium: EnviroVent Stadium; Attendance: 2,744; Referee: Bobby Madden

29 December 2022 22	Bradford City	1–0	Harrogate Town	Bradford
19:45 GMT	Wright 1'; Sutton (yellow card) 42'	Report	Mattock (yellow card) 34'; Thomson (yellow card) 79'	Stadium: University of Bradford Stadium; Attendance: 17,056; Referee: Ross Joyce

1 January 2023 23	Hartlepool United	3–3	Harrogate Town	Hartlepool
15:00 GMT	Umerah (yellow card) 37', (goal) 45'; Sylla 46'; Shelton 63'	Report	Pattison 4'; Folarin 49'; Thomson 73'; Ramsay (yellow card) 88'	Stadium: The Suit Direct Stadium; Attendance: 4,566; Referee: Marc Edwards

7 January 2023 24	Harrogate Town	1–3	Colchester United	Harrogate
15:00 GMT	Ramsay (yellow card) 7'; Thomson (yellow card) 60'; Armstrong 77'	Report	Akinde 12'; Chilvers 17', (yellow card) 50'; Chambers (yellow card) 45+5'; Tchamadeu 54'; Smith (yellow card) 90'	Stadium: The EnviroVent Stadium; Attendance: 2,144; Referee: Darren Handley

14 January 2023 25	Harrogate Town	1–1	Stevenage	Harrogate
15:00 GMT	Armstrong 77'	Report	Roberts (yellow card) 22'; Piergianni 60'	Stadium: The EnviroVent Stadium; Attendance: 2,314; Referee: Adam Herczeg

21 January 2023	Grimsby Town	Postponed	Harrogate Town	Cleethorpes
15:00 GMT				Stadium: Blundell Park
Note: Fixture was postponed due to a frozen pitch.

28 January 2023 26	Harrogate Town	0–1	Sutton United	Harrogate
15:00 GMT	Folarin (yellow card) 11'	Report	Ajiboye 8'; Goodliffe (yellow card) 58'	Stadium: The EnviroVent Stadium; Attendance: 2,356; Referee: Anthony Backhouse

4 February 2023 27	Carlisle United	0–1	Harrogate Town	Carlisle
15:00 GMT	Mellish (yellow card) 56'; Gibson (yellow card) 86'	Report	Foulds (yellow card) 77'; Huntington 82' (o.g.); Falkingham (yellow card) 90'	Stadium: Brunton Park; Attendance: 6,422; Referee: Robert Lewis

11 February 2023 28	Harrogate Town	1–3	Stockport County	Harrogate
15:00 GMT	Hinchliffe 63' (o.g.)	Report	Hippolyte 19'; Olaofe 34', (yellow card) 58'; Croasdale (yellow card) 60'; Collar 73'	Stadium: The EnviroVent Stadium; Attendance: 2,404; Referee: Darren Drysdale

14 February 2023 29	Salford City	1–1	Harrogate Town	Salford
19:45 GMT	Lund 81'	Report	Sutton (yellow card) 22'; Muldoon 50'; Burrell (yellow card) 69'	Stadium: Peninsula Stadium; Attendance: 1,615 (78 away); Referee: Seb Stockbridge

18 February 2023 30	Harrogate Town	2–2	Crewe Alexandra	Harrogate
15:00 GMT	Muldoon 34'; Olaigbe 52'	Report	Adebisi (yellow card) 61'; Finnigan (yellow card) 73'; Agyei 83' (pen.); Uwakwe 89'	Stadium: The EnviroVent Stadium; Attendance: 2,607; Referee: Lewis Smith

21 February 2023 31	Grimsby Town	0–0	Harrogate Town	Cleethorpes
19:45 GMT		Report		Stadium: Blundell Park; Attendance: 5,487; Referee: Tom Nield

25 February 2023 32	Swindon Town	3–0	Harrogate Town	Swindon
15:00 GMT	Hepburn-Murphy 8', 40'; Wakeling (yellow card) 58'; Tomlinson 78'	Report	Falkingham (yellow card) 13'; Muldoon (yellow card) 21'; Eastman (yellow card) 27'	Stadium: The County Ground; Attendance: 8,756 (73 away); Referee: Oliver Langford

28 February 2023 33	Harrogate Town	1–1	Northampton Town	Harrogate
19:45 GMT	Armstrong 50'; Olaigbe (yellow card) 62'	Report	Pinnock 49'; Yengi (yellow card) 80'	Stadium: The EnviroVent Stadium; Attendance: 2,120; Referee: Thomas Parsons

5 March 2023 34	Harrogate Town	0–0	Gillingham	Harrogate
15:00 GMT		Report	Hawkins (yellow card) 67'; Dieng (yellow card) 89'	Stadium: The EnviroVent Stadium; Attendance: 2,610 (600 away); Referee: Andy Haines

7 March 2023 35	Doncaster Rovers	0–2	Harrogate Town	Doncaster
19:45 GMT	Close (yellow card) 57'	Report	Armstrong 81'; Pattison 84'	Stadium: The Eco-Power Stadium; Attendance: 5,777 (235 away); Referee: David Rock

11 March 2023 36	Crawley Town	3–1	Harrogate Town	Crawley
15:00 GMT	Oteh 8', 43'; Nadesan (yellow card) 25'; Tilley (yellow card) 32'; Powell (yellow card) 36'; Gordon (yellow card) 83'	Report	Folarin (yellow card) 87'; Pattison (yellow card) 88'; Sims (red card) 90+1'; O'Connor 90+5'	Stadium: Broadfield Stadium; Attendance: 3,317; Referee: Simon Mather

18 March 2023 37	Harrogate Town	1–0	Barrow	Harrogate
15:00 GMT	Daly 74'; Pattison (yellow card) 90+1'	Report	Whitfield (yellow card) 90+4'	Stadium: The EnviroVent Stadium; Attendance: 2,343 (514 away); Referee: Will Finnie

31 March 2023 38	Tranmere Rovers	1–1	Harrogate Town	Birkenhead
19:45 BST	Oxley 36' (o.g.); Dacres-Cogley (yellow card) 54'; Hendry (yellow card) 63'; Turnbull (yellow card) 67'	Report	Armstrong 4'; O'Connor (yellow card) 35'; Falkingham (yellow card) 49'; Sutton (yellow card) 67'	Stadium: Prenton Park; Attendance: 5,861; Referee: Sunny Gill

7 April 2023 39	Harrogate Town	2–2	AFC Wimbledon	Harrogate
15:00 BST	Foulds (yellow card) 41'; Falkingham (yellow card) 77'; Armstrong 89'; Sutton 90+7'	Report	Nightingale (yellow card) 25'; Chislett 32', 57'; Ogundere (yellow card) 75'; Al-Hamadi (yellow card) 90+5'	Stadium: The Envirovent Stadium; Attendance: 2,891; Referee: Scott Jackson

10 April 2023 40	Leyton Orient	2–2	Harrogate Town	Leyton
15:00 BST	Sotiriou 9', 36'	Report	O'Connor 54', (yellow card) 83'; Thomson 57'; Falkingham (yellow card) 65'	Stadium: Brisbane Road; Attendance: 8,092 (136 away); Referee: James Bell

15 April 2023 41	Harrogate Town	2–2	Doncaster Rovers	Harrogate
15:00 BST	Sims (yellow card) 39'; Armstrong 50'; Eastman 60'	Report	Ravenhill (yellow card) 12'; Barlow 34'; Molyneux 47'	Stadium: The EnviroVent Stadium; Attendance: 3,014; Referee: Bobby Madley

18 April 2023 42	Harrogate Town	3–0	Walsall	Harrogate
19:45 BST	Folarin 10'; Olaigbe 66'; Pattison 76'	Report		Stadium: The EnviroVent Stadium; Attendance: 1,867; Referee: Rebecca Welch

22 April 2023 43	Northampton Town	3–1	Harrogate Town	Sixfields
15:00 BST	Norman Jr. 10'; Hondermarck (yellow card) 20'; Hoskins 23'; Bowie 45+2'; McWilliams (yellow card) 57'	Report	Olaigbe 3'	Stadium: Sixfields Stadium; Attendance: 7,018 (107 away); Referee: Seb Stocksbridge

25 April 2023 44	Newport County	2–3	Harrogate Town	Newport
19:45 BST	Bogle 3', 79'; Bennett (yellow card) 39'; Evans (yellow card) 61'; Waite (yellow card) 90+2'	Report	Folarin 5'; Thomson 9'; Sims (yellow card) 54'; Armstrong 83'	Stadium: Rodney Parade; Attendance: 3,710 (55 away); Referee: Neil Hair

29 April 2023 45	Mansfield Town	1–2	Harrogate Town	Mansfield
15:00 BST	Swan 67'; Gale (yellow card) 90+1'	Report	Kilgour 27' (o.g.); Mattock (yellow card) 33'; Daly 39'	Stadium: One Call Stadium; Attendance: 7,088 (191 Harrogate fans); Referee: David Rock

8 May 2023 46	Harrogate Town	1–1	Rochdale	Harrogate
15:00 BST	Sims 74'	Report	Keohane 24'	Stadium: Wetherby Road; Attendance: 3,234; Referee: Carl Boyeson

=== FA Cup ===
Town were drawn away to Bradford City in the first round and to the winners off Solihull Moors versus Hartlepool United in the second round.

Win Draw Loss Fixtures

5 November 2022 First round	Bradford City	0–1	Harrogate Town	Bradford
12:30 GMT	Halliday (yellow card) 53'	Report	Daly 9'; Headley (yellow card) 13'; Mattock (yellow card) 33'	Stadium: University of Bradford Stadium; Attendance: 6,837; Referee: Martin Coy

26 November 2022 Second round	Hartlepool United	3–1	Harrogate Town	Hartlepool
15:00 GMT	Missilou (yellow card) 19'; Cooke 41'; Umerah 45+4' (pen.), 71', (yellow card) 77'	Report	Mattock (yellow card) 22' (yellow-red card) 45+3'; Burrell (yellow card) 40'; Headley (yellow card) 64'; Coley 73', (yellow card) 90+4'	Stadium: Suit Direct Stadium; Attendance: 2,772; Referee: Sam Purkiss

=== EFL Cup ===
Win Draw Loss Fixtures

Harrogate were drawn at home to Stockport County in the first round.

9 August 2022 First round	Harrogate Town	0–1	Stockport County	Harrogate
19:45 BST		Report	Croasdale (yellow card) 39'; Jennings 53' (pen.); Brown (yellow card) 70'; Hippolyte (yellow card) 90+2'	Stadium: The EnviroVent Stadium; Attendance: 1,534; Referee: Thomas Kirk

=== EFL Trophy ===
On 23 June, the group stage draw was finalised.

Pos	Div	Team	Pld	W	PW	PL	L	GF	GA	GD	Pts	Qualification
1	ACA	Everton U21	3	1	1	1	0	10	4	+6	6	Advance to Round 2
2	L1	Morecambe	3	0	2	0	1	4	5	−1	4	Advance to Round 2
3	L2	Harrogate Town	3	1	0	1	1	3	4	−1	4	
4	L2	Hartlepool United	3	1	0	1	1	2	6	−4	4	

Source: EFL.com

Win Draw Loss Fixtures

30 August 2022 Group stage	Hartlepool United	2–0	Harrogate Town	Hartlepool
19:00 BST	Ndjoli 17', 33'; Sterry (yellow card) 21'	Report	Burrell (yellow card) 14'	Stadium: Suit Direct Stadium; Attendance: 1,500; Referee: Anthony Backhouse

4 October 2022 Group stage	Harrogate Town	1–1 (2–4 p)	Everton U21	Harrogate
19:00 BST	Ferguson (yellow card) 38'; Austerfield (yellow card) 64'; Grant 72'	Report	Mills 10'; Price (yellow card) 85'	Stadium: The EnviroVent Stadium; Attendance: 832; Referee: Marc Edwards
	Penalties
	Armstrong (penalty missed); Pattison (penalty missed); Grant (penalty scored); Headley (penalty scored)		Cannon (penalty scored); Okoronkwo (penalty missed); Price (penalty scored); Mills (penalty scored); Quirk (penalty scored)

18 October 2022 Group stage	Harrogate Town	2–1	Morecambe	Harrogate
19:00 BST	O'Boyle 28'; Welch-Hayes 90+6'	Report	Major 2'; Smith (yellow card) 53'	Stadium: The EnviroVent Stadium; Attendance: 717; Referee: Darren Drysdale
