= Bradley Williams (footballer) =

English footballer (born 2004)

Personal information
- Date of birth: 3 September 2004 (age 22)
- Position: Midfielder

Team information
- Current team: Harrogate Town
- Number: 34

Youth career
- Harrogate Town

Senior career*
Years	Team	Apps	(Gls)
2021–	Harrogate Town	2	(0)
2023–2024	→ Darlington	4	(0)
- * Club domestic league appearances and goals as of 11:27, 16 May 2024 (UTC)

Bradley Williams (born 3 September 2004) is an English professional footballer who plays as a midfielder for National League club Harrogate Town. He spent a month on loan at National League North club Darlington at the end of 2023.

== Career ==
Williams began a two-year scholarship at Harrogate Town in June 2021. He made his first-team debut for the club on 5 October 2021, coming on as a late substitute in a 2–0 win over Newcastle United U21 in an EFL Trophy match at Wetherby Road. Manager Simon Weaver said: "It's a massive moment seeing those three lads [Williams, Ilesanmi and Tweed] on the pitch. The reaction of the crowd was magical". He made his debut in EFL League Two on 3 December 2022, in a 4–1 victory at Rochdale.

Williams joined National League North club Darlington on 8 December 2023 on loan for a month. He made four appearances, all as a substitute, before returning to Harrogate.

== Career statistics ==
As of end of 2023–24 season

Appearances and goals by club, season and competition
Club	Season	League			FA Cup		EFL Cup		Other		Total	
Club	Season	Division	Apps	Goals	Apps	Goals	Apps	Goals	Apps	Goals	Apps	Goals
Harrogate Town	2021–22	EFL League Two	0	0	0	0	0	0	1 (Note: Appearance/s in the EFL Trophy)	0	1	0
Harrogate Town	2022–23	EFL League Two	2	0	0	0	0	0	0	0	2	0
Harrogate Town	2023–24	EFL League Two	0	0	0	0	0	0	0	0	0	0
Harrogate Town	Total		2	0	0	0	0	0	1	0	3	0
Darlington	2023–24	National League North	4	0	—		—		—		4	0
Career total			6	0	0	0	0	0	1	0	7	0
