= Ilesanmi =

- Gender: Male
- Language: Yoruba

Origin
- Origin: Nigeria
- Region of origin: South Western Nigeria

Ilesanmi audio is both a surname and a given name of Yoruba origin. Notable people with the name include:

== Surname ==
- Femi Ilesanmi (born 1991), English footballer
- Emmanuel Ilesanmi (born 2004), English footballer

== Given name ==
- Ilesanmi Adesida (born 1949), American physicist
