= Oli Robinson =

English footballer (born 200?)

Personal information
- Position: Forward

Team information
- Current team: Harrogate Town
- Number: 33

Youth career
- Leeds United
- Harrogate Town
- Barnsley

Senior career*
Years	Team	Apps	(Gls)
2024–	Harrogate Town	0	(0)
- * Club domestic league appearances and goals as of 13:27, 20 October 2024 (UTC)

Oli Robinson is an English professional footballer who plays as a forward for National League club Harrogate Town.

== Career ==
Robinson accepted a scholarship at Harrogate Town in May 2023 after previously spending time with Leeds United and Barnsley. On 8 October 2024, he became the second player from the club's Player Development Centre to make his first-team debut.

== Career statistics ==
As of match played 8 October 2024

Appearances and goals by club, season and competition
Club	Season	League			FA Cup		EFL Cup		Other		Total	
Club	Season	Division	Apps	Goals	Apps	Goals	Apps	Goals	Apps	Goals	Apps	Goals
Harrogate Town	2024–25	EFL League Two	0	0	0	0	0	0	1 (Note: Appearance(s) in the EFL Trophy)	0	1	0
Career total			0	0	0	0	0	0	1	0	1	0
