= Dean Cornelius =

Scottish footballer

Personal information
- Full name: Dean Cornelius
- Date of birth: 11 April 2001 (age 25)
- Place of birth: Bellshill, Scotland
- Height: 5 ft 9 in (1.75 m)
- Position: Midfielder

Team information
- Current team: Ross County
- Number: 8

Youth career
- Hibernian

Senior career*
Years	Team	Apps	(Gls)
2018–2023	Motherwell	46	(2)
2023–2025	Harrogate Town	74	(3)
2025–	Ross County	23	(0)
- * Club domestic league appearances and goals as of 4 May 2026

Dean Cornelius (born 11 April 2001) is a Scottish professional footballer who plays as a midfielder for Scottish Championship club Ross County. Cornelius started his career at Motherwell before moving to Harrogate Town.

== Club career ==
Cornelius signed for Motherwell in the summer of 2018 from Hibernian. He made his debut as a substitute in Motherwell's 3–2 victory at home to Livingston on 18 May 2019.

In June 2021, he signed a new two-year contract with Motherwell. He made his first start for the club on 14 July 2021, in a 1–0 win away to Queen's Park in the Scottish League Cup group stage. On 18 December 2021, Cornelius scored in his first Motherwell league start in a 2–0 home win against St Johnstone in the Scottish Premiership.

On 31 May 2023, Motherwell announced that they had offered Cornelius a new contract, with his current deal expiring. On 22 June 2023, Harrogate Town announced the signing of Cornelius to a two-year contract.

On 8 May 2025, the club announced the player would be released in June when his contract expired. On 23 June 2025 Cornelius joined Scottish Championship club Ross County on a two-year deal.

== Career statistics ==
As of match played 11 July 2026

Appearances and goals by club, season and competition
Club	Season	League			Cup		League Cup		Other		Total	
Club	Season	Division	Apps	Goals	Apps	Goals	Apps	Goals	Apps	Goals	Apps	Goals
Motherwell	2018–19	Scottish Premiership	1	0	0	0	0	0	—		1	0
Motherwell	2019–20	Scottish Premiership	0	0	0	0	0	0	—		0	0
Motherwell	2020–21	Scottish Premiership	1	0	0	0	0	0	0	0	1	0
Motherwell	2021–22	Scottish Premiership	12	2	2	0	3	0	—		17	2
Motherwell	2022–23	Scottish Premiership	32	0	1	0	1	0	0	0	34	2
Motherwell	Total		46	2	3	0	4	0	0	0	53	2
Harrogate Town	2023–24	League Two	39	2	2	0	1	0	1 (Note: Appearance(s) in the EFL Trophy.)	0	43	2
Harrogate Town	2024–25	League Two	35	1	3	1	1	0	3	0	42	2
Harrogate Town	Total		74	3	5	1	2	0	4	0	85	4
Ross County	2025–26	Scottish Championship	23	0	2	0	4	0	2 (Note: Appearance(s) in the Scottish Challenge Cup.)	0	31	0
Ross County	2026–27	Scottish League One	0	0	0	0	1	0	0	0	1	0
Ross County	Total		23	0	2	0	5	0	2	0	32	0
Career total			143	5	10	1	11	0	6	0	170	8
