= Jack Muldoon =

English footballer

Personal information
- Full name: Jonathan Jack Lyndan Muldoon
- Date of birth: 19 May 1989 (age 37)
- Place of birth: Scunthorpe, England
- Height: 5 ft 10 in (1.78 m)
- Position: Forward

Team information
- Current team: Harrogate Town
- Number: 18

Youth career
- 1997–2007: Scunthorpe United
- 2007–2008: Doncaster Rovers

Senior career*
| Years | Team | Apps | (Gls) |
| 2008 | Brigg Town | | |
| 2008–2009 | Sheffield | 22 | (3) |
| 2009–2010 | Glapwell | | |
| 2010 | Alfreton Town | | |
| 2010–2012 | Stocksbridge Park Steels | | |
| 2012 | Brigg Town | | |
| 2012–2013 | North Ferriby United | 22 | (2) |
| 2012–2013 | → Sheffield (loan) | 21 | (9) |
| 2013–2014 | Worksop Town | ? | (21) |
| 2014–2015 | Rochdale | 3 | (0) |
| 2015 | → FC Halifax Town (loan) | 12 | (2) |
| 2015–2017 | Lincoln City | 71 | (12) |
| 2017–2018 | AFC Fylde | 44 | (10) |
| 2018– | Harrogate Town | 301 | (77) |
- * Club domestic league appearances and goals as of 1 January 2026

Jonathan Jack Lyndan Muldoon (born 19 May 1989) is an English professional footballer who plays as a forward for National League club Harrogate Town.

== Career ==
=== Non-League ===
Muldoon started his career at home-town club Scunthorpe United as a winger, being released in his second year as a youth. After a mid-season at Doncaster Rovers he moved to lower league football, starting with Brigg Town.

Muldoon subsequently represented Sheffield, Glapwell, Alfreton Town, Stocksbridge Park Steels, North Ferriby United and Worksop Town. With the latter he scored 21 league goals during the campaign, attracting interest from Football League clubs.

=== Rochdale ===
On 15 May 2014, Muldoon joined Rochdale on a one-year deal, and then quit his job as a plasterer in order to pursue being a professional footballer. He made his début on 7 October 2014, coming on as a 58th-minute substitute during Rochdale's 1–0 Football League Trophy defeat against Walsall. He made his Football League debut on 15 November 2014, coming on as a 68th minute substitution for Michael Rose in a 0–1 away loss against Port Vale. He was released at the end of the season.

=== Lincoln City ===
On 28 May 2015, he signed an initial one-year contract at Lincoln City after his release from Rochdale. Made his debut in a 1–1 home draw with Cheltenham and then managed to score his first goal for the Imps in a 1–1 draw with Eastleigh. In January 2016 he signed a new one-year contract extension.

=== Harrogate Town ===
On 30 June 2018, Muldoon signed for Harrogate Town from AFC Fylde. Muldoon played in and won the 2020 FA Trophy final with Harrogate.

== Personal life ==
He has been diagnosed with Type 1 diabetes.

== Career statistics ==
As of match played 1 January 2026

Appearances and goals by club, season and competition
| Club | Season | League | | | FA Cup | | League Cup | | Other | | Total | |
| Club | Season | Division | Apps | Goals | Apps | Goals | Apps | Goals | Apps | Goals | Apps | Goals |
|---|---|---|---|---|---|---|---|---|---|---|---|---|
| Rochdale | 2014–15 | League One | 3 | 0 | 2 | 0 | 0 | 0 | 1 (Note: Appearance in Football League Trophy) | 0 | 6 | 0 |
| FC Halifax Town (loan) | 2014–15 | Conference Premier | 12 | 2 | 0 | 0 | — | | 1 (Note: Appearances in FA Trophy) | 0 | 13 | 2 |
| Lincoln City | 2015–16 | National League | 46 | 9 | 3 | 0 | — | | 1 | 1 | 50 | 10 |
| Lincoln City | 2016–17 | National League | 25 | 3 | 9 | 0 | — | | 4 | 0 | 38 | 3 |
| Lincoln City | Total | | 71 | 12 | 12 | 0 | — | | 5 | 1 | 88 | 13 |
| AFC Fylde | 2017–18 | National League | 44 | 10 | 2 | 0 | — | | 1 | 0 | 47 | 10 |
| Harrogate Town | 2018–19 | National League | 44 | 15 | 0 | 0 | — | | 1 | 0 | 45 | 15 |
| Harrogate Town | 2019–20 | National League | 39 | 14 | 2 | 0 | — | | 6 | 2 | 47 | 16 |
| Harrogate Town | 2020–21 | League Two | 40 | 14 | 2 | 0 | 2 | 0 | 1 | 0 | 45 | 14 |
| Harrogate Town | 2021–22 | League Two | 42 | 12 | 2 | 0 | 0 | 0 | 6 | 1 | 50 | 13 |
| Harrogate Town | 2022–23 | League Two | 42 | 4 | 2 | 0 | 1 | 0 | 2 | 0 | 47 | 4 |
| Harrogate Town | 2023–24 | League Two | 37 | 11 | 2 | 0 | 2 | 0 | 2 | 0 | 43 | 11 |
| Harrogate Town | 2024–25 | League Two | 39 | 2 | 3 | 1 | 2 | 0 | 3 | 1 | 47 | 4 |
| Harrogate Town | 2025–26 | League Two | 18 | 5 | 1 | 0 | 0 | 0 | 2 | 2 | 21 | 7 |
| Harrogate Town | Total | | 301 | 77 | 14 | 1 | 7 | 0 | 23 | 6 | 345 | 84 |
| Career total | | | 431 | 101 | 30 | 1 | 7 | 0 | 31 | 7 | 499 | 109 |

== Honours ==
Lincoln City

- National League: 2016–17

Harrogate Town

- National League play-offs: 2020
- FA Trophy: 2019–20
