= Sam Folarin =

English footballer (born 2000)

Personal information
- Full name: Samuel Oluwatimilehin Adetokunbo Folarin
- Date of birth: 23 September 2000 (age 26)
- Place of birth: Lambeth, England
- Height: 1.75 m (5 ft 9 in)
- Position: Winger

Team information
- Current team: Sutton United
- Number: 11

Youth career
- 2013–2017: Wandsworth Town
- 2017–2018: Tooting & Mitcham United

Senior career*
Years	Team	Apps	(Gls)
2018–2019	Tooting & Mitcham United	5	(0)
2019–2022	Middlesbrough	2	(0)
2022	→ Queen of the South (loan)	7	(0)
2022–2025	Harrogate Town	73	(9)
2025–2026	Hartlepool United	34	(1)
2025–2026	→ Chelmsford City (loan)	12	(2)
2026–	Sutton United	0	(0)
- * Club domestic league appearances and goals as of 19:19, 16 June 2026 (UTC)

Samuel Oluwatimilehin Adetokunbo Folarin (born 23 September 2000) is an English professional footballer who plays as a winger for National League club Sutton United.

== Club career ==
Folarin started his career in the youth ranks at Wandsworth Town before moving to Tooting & Mitcham United in search of senior first team football. After a breaking into the first-team in the 2018–19 season, he was offered a trial at Charlton Athletic but was not signed by the London club. After a subsequent trial at Middlesbrough, Folarin was offered a contract along with team-mate Isaiah Jones.

On 15 September 2020, Folarin debuted for Middlesbrough in the EFL Cup in a 2–0 defeat versus Barnsley at the Riverside Stadium. In January 2021, Folarin scored his first senior goal against Brentford in the FA Cup.

On 26 January 2022, Folarin joined Scottish Championship club Queen of the South on loan, for the remainder of the 2021–22 season.

In August 2022, he joined League Two side Harrogate Town on a full-time basis. On 17 May 2024, he signed a new one-year deal with Harrogate.

On 24 January 2025, Folarin signed for National League side Hartlepool United for an undisclosed fee. On 19 September 2025, Folarin joined National League South club Chelmsford City on loan. On 6 May 2026, Hartlepool announced he was being released.

On 16 June 2026, Folarin joined fellow National League club Sutton United.

== Style of play ==
Folarin originally played at right-wingback when he was at Tooting & Mitcham United but was converted to a striker/right winger after moving to Middlesbrough.

== Personal life ==
Folarin is of Nigerian descent.

== Career statistics ==
As of 31 March 2026

Appearances and goals by club, season and competition
Club	Season	League			FA Cup		EFL Cup		Other		Total	
Club	Season	Division	Apps	Goals	Apps	Goals	Apps	Goals	Apps	Goals	Apps	Goals
Tooting & Mitcham United	2018–19	Isthmian League South Central	5	0	0	0	—		0	0	5	0
Middlesbrough	2019–20	Championship	0	0	0	0	0	0	—		0	0
Middlesbrough	2020–21	Championship	2	0	1	1	1	0	—		4	1
Middlesbrough	2021–22	Championship	0	0	0	0	0	0	—		0	0
Middlesbrough	Total		2	0	1	1	1	0	0	0	4	1
Queen of the South (loan)	2021–22	Scottish Championship	7	0	0	0	0	0	0	0	7	0
Harrogate Town	2022–23	League Two	27	4	1	0	0	0	2 (Note: Appearance(s) in EFL Trophy)	0	30	4
Harrogate Town	2023–24	League Two	27	3	1	2	2	1	2	2	32	8
Harrogate Town	2024–25	League Two	19	2	3	0	1	1	2	0	25	3
Harrogate Town	Total		73	9	5	2	3	2	6	2	87	15
Hartlepool United	2024–25	National League	16	1	0	0	0	0	0	0	16	1
Hartlepool United	2025–26	National League	18	0	0	0	0	0	0	0	18	0
Hartlepool United	Total		34	1	0	0	0	0	0	0	34	1
Chelmsford City (loan)	2025–26	National League South	12	2	3	0	0	0	1	0	16	2
Career total			133	12	9	3	4	2	7	2	153	19
