= Derrick Abu =

English footballer (born 2003)

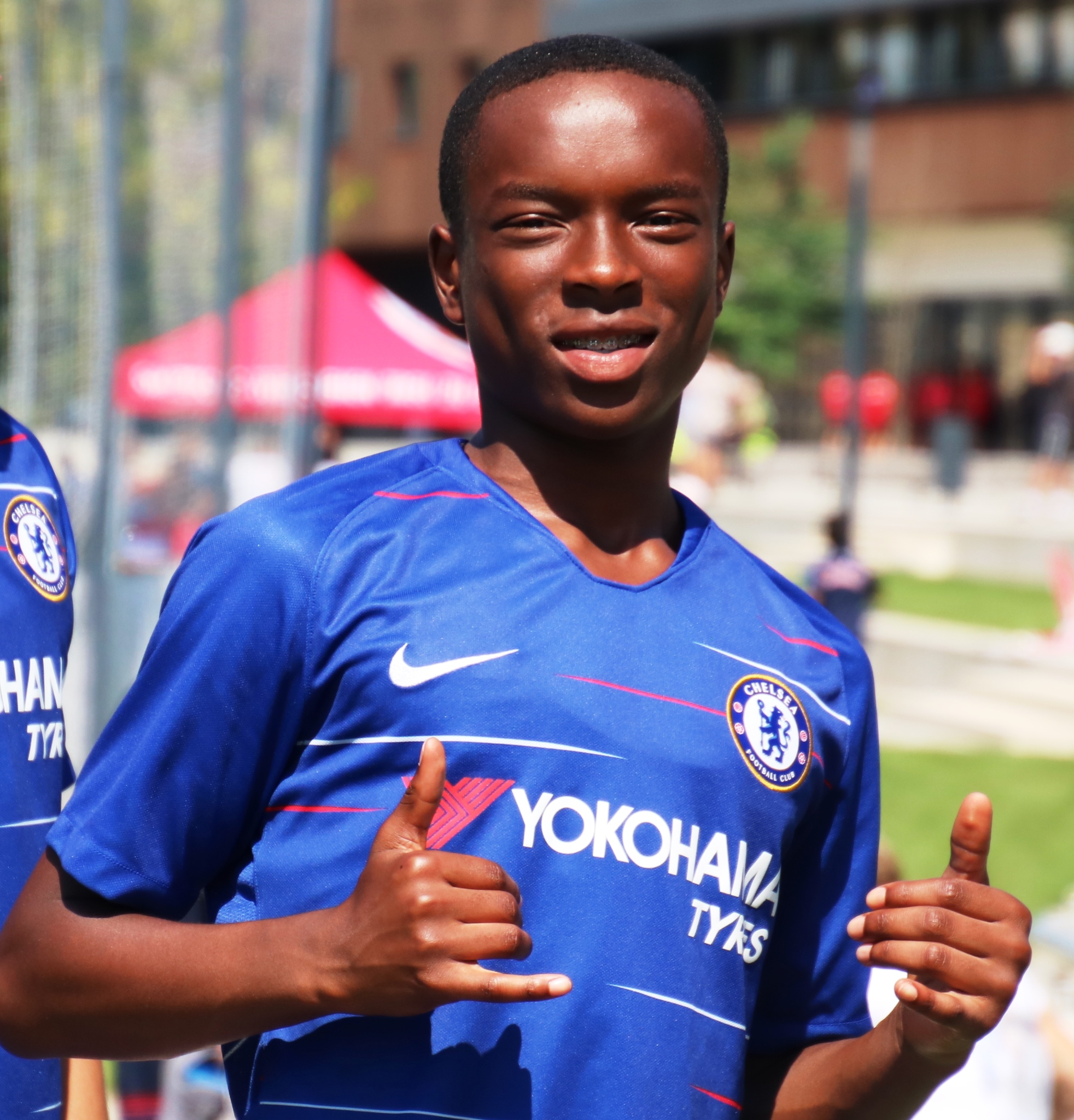
- Derrick Abu playing for Chelsea Academy in 2018

Personal information
- Date of birth: 18 December 2003 (age 22)
- Place of birth: Regensburg, Germany
- Height: 1.79 m (5 ft 10 in)
- Position: Right-back

Team information
- Current team: Valenciennes
- Number: 2

Youth career
- Coerver Coaching Performance Academy
- 2012–2023: Chelsea
- 2023–2024: Southampton

Senior career*
Years	Team	Apps	(Gls)
2024–2025	Southampton	0	(0)
2024	→ Harrogate Town (loan)	14	(0)
2025–	Valenciennes	18	(0)

International career^{‡}
2020	England U17	2	(0)
- * Club domestic league appearances and goals as of 06:39, 3 November 2026 (UTC) ‡ National team caps and goals as of 2 January 2023

Derrick Abu (born 18 December 2003) is a professional footballer who plays as a right-back for Ligue 3 club Valenciennes. Born in Germany, he represented England at youth level.

== Club career ==
=== Early career ===
Born in Regensburg, Germany to Nigerian parents, Abu's family moved to England in 2006, when he was two years old. After representing grassroots side Coerver Coaching at a tournament in Spain, he was scouted and signed by Premier League side Chelsea at under-11 level. He signed a scholarship contract with The Blues in July 2020, before signing on professional terms in February 2021.

In late April 2023, he went on trial with fellow Premier League side Crystal Palace, scoring the winning penalty in a 5–3 penalty shoot-out win against the youth team of Valencia in the Premier League International Cup semi-final. On 16 June 2023, Chelsea announced that Abu would leave the club when his contract expired at the end of June.

=== Southampton ===
On 5 July 2023, Abu joined Southampton on a two-year contract, initially joinining the Under-21 side for the 2023–24 season.

On 1 February 2024, Abu joined League Two side Harrogate Town for the remainder of the 2023–24 season. Two days later, he made his first appearance for the club in a 1–1 draw against Stockport County.

On 25 June 2025, Southampton confirmed that Abu would be released following the expiry of his contract.

=== Valenciennes ===
On 1 July 2025, Abu joined Valenciennes on a two-year contract.

== International career ==
Abu is eligible to represent England, Germany and Nigeria at international level. In 2019, he reportedly made himself available to represent Nigeria at youth international level. He has since stated his desire to represent all three countries before making a final decision on who to represent.

He has represented England at under-17 level.

== Music career ==
Describing himself as having a "huge passion for music", Abu was involved with his church's choir from a young age, and wrote his first song at the age of eleven. He released a rap single in early 2022, and followed this up with an EP later the same year, under the name Cho$en.

== Career statistics ==
=== Club ===
As of match played 31 October 2026

Appearances and goals by club, season and competition
Club	Season	League			Domestic Cup		League Cup		Europe		Other		Total	
Club	Season	Division	Apps	Goals	Apps	Goals	Apps	Goals	Apps	Goals	Apps	Goals	Apps	Goals
Chelsea U21	2022–23	—			—		—		—		2 (Note: Appearances in EFL Trophy)	0	2	0
Southampton	2023–24	Championship	0	0	0	0	0	0	—		—		0	0
Harrogate Town (loan)	2023–24	League Two	14	0	—		—		—		0	0	14	0
Valenciennes	2025–26	Championnat National	7	0	0	0	—		—		—		7	0
Valenciennes	2026–27	Ligue 3	11	0	0	0	—		—		—		11	0
Valenciennes	Total		18	0	0	0	—		—		—		18	0
Career total			32	0	0	0	0	0	0	0	2	0	34	0

== Discography ==
=== Singles ===
- Life's Changing (2022)
- Real Love (2022)
- Gucci (2022)
- little do you know (2022)
- Waste my time (2022)
- Outside (2023)
- Get in motion (2023)

=== EPs ===
- Page 1 (2022)
