= Luke Armstrong =

English footballer (born 1996)

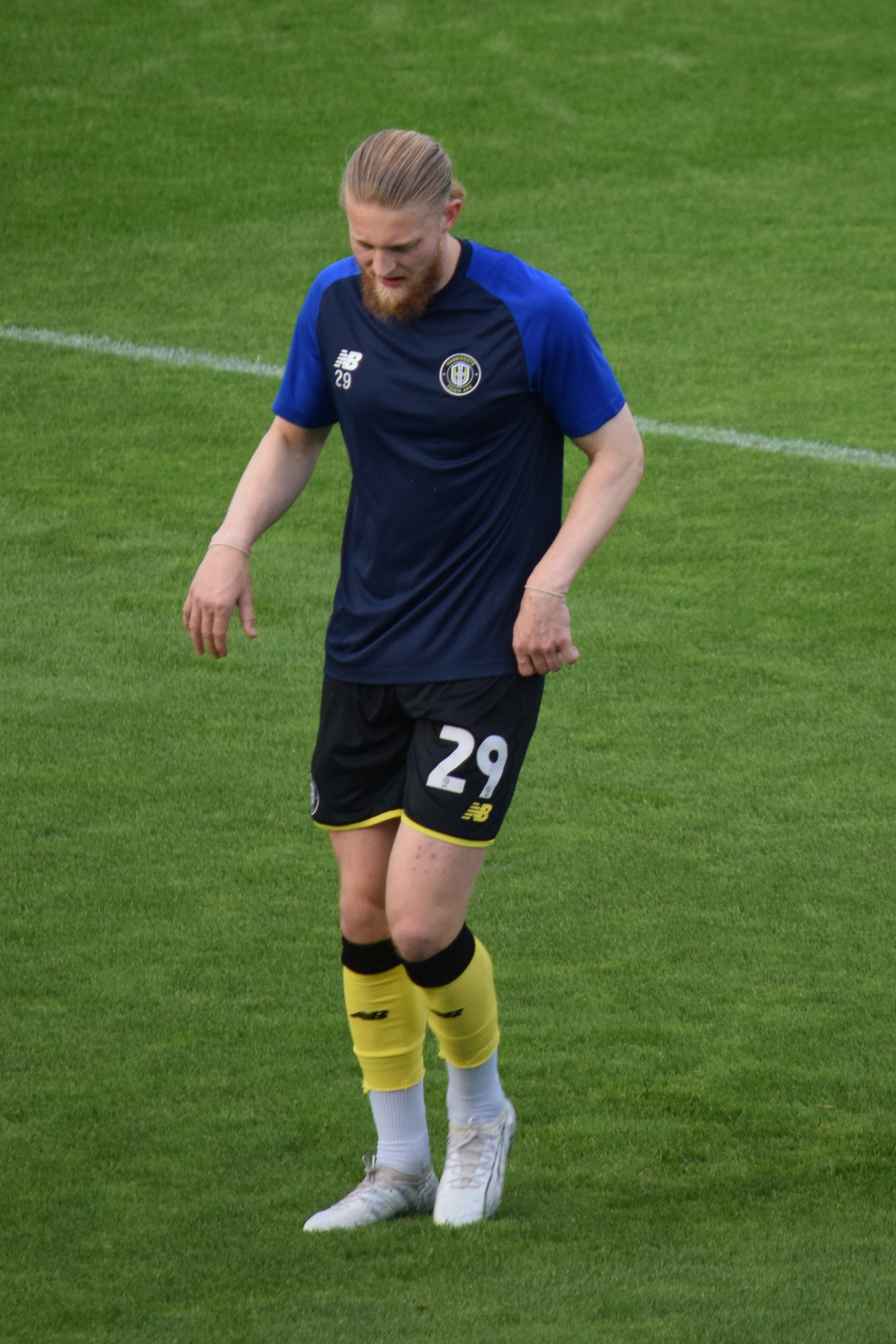
- Armstrong warming up for Harrogate Town in 2023

Personal information
- Full name: Luke Thomas Armstrong
- Date of birth: 2 July 1996 (age 30)
- Place of birth: Durham, England
- Height: 1.85 m (6 ft 1 in)
- Position: Striker

Team information
- Current team: Carlisle United
- Number: 29

Youth career
- 2009–2014: Middlesbrough
- 2014–2015: Birmingham City

Senior career*
Years	Team	Apps	(Gls)
2015–2016	Cowdenbeath	6	(0)
2016–2017	Blyth Spartans	42	(23)
2017–2019	Middlesbrough	0	(0)
2018	→ Gateshead (loan)	17	(10)
2019	→ Accrington Stanley (loan)	16	(3)
2019–2021	Salford City	25	(1)
2020–2021	→ Hartlepool United (loan)	28	(13)
2021–2024	Harrogate Town	103	(29)
2024–	Carlisle United	79	(17)
2025	→ Motherwell (loan)	14	(4)
- * Club domestic league appearances and goals as of 15:20, 3 May 2026 (UTC)

Luke Thomas Armstrong (born 2 July 1996) is an English professional footballer who plays as a striker for National League club Carlisle United.

Armstrong came through the ranks at Middlesbrough and Birmingham City. After a short spell in Scotland with Cowdenbeath, he joined Blyth Spartans who were then managed by his father Alun Armstrong. At Blyth, Armstrong would win the Northern Premier League, attracting the interest of former side Middlesbrough. He had a successful loan spell at Gateshead from Middlesbrough before briefly joining Accrington Stanley on loan. In 2019, he signed for newly promoted League Two side Salford City before joining National League team Hartlepool United on loan. Armstrong was a member of Hartlepool's promotion winning team, scoring in the side's play-off final win in 2021. He subsequently signed for League Two side Harrogate Town for an undisclosed fee.

== Club career ==
=== Early career ===
Armstrong began his career with Middlesbrough, making his way up through the academy teams until he was released by the club in the summer of 2014. He subsequently joined Birmingham City's youth setup on a one-year deal after a successful trial period but would leave after he was informed that his contract with Birmingham City would not be renewed in the summer of 2015.

Armstrong then had a successful trial period with Scottish League One outfit Cowdenbeath, leading to him being handed a one-year deal. After six months with the club, Armstrong decided to terminate his contract due his game time being limited to just a few substitute appearances during the half-season.

Following this setback, Armstrong would join Northern Premier League Premier Division club Blyth Spartans, which was then managed by his father, Alun Armstrong. He would score 23 goals across the season, helping his team to win the Northumberland Senior Cup and league title, ultimately attracting the attention of one of his previous employers in the form of Middlesbrough.

=== Return to Middlesbrough and loans ===
On 16 July 2018, Armstrong joined National League club Gateshead on loan until the end of the season. On 29 July 2018, he notably scored a hat-trick against his former club Blyth Spartans during a 3–1 victory in a friendly at Croft Park. After scoring on his Heed début, Armstrong would score two goals against Salford City in a 2–1 victory. He went on to make 18 appearances for the club, during which he scored a further seven goals, by the time his loan was cut short by parent club Middlesbrough on 31 December 2018.

Upon his return to Middlesbrough, Armstrong would sign a new two-and-a-half-year contract with the Championship club, before being shipped out on loan to Accrington Stanley of League One on 11 January 2019. He made his debut for the club the next day, in a goalless League One tie versus Bristol Rovers at the Wham Stadium.

=== Salford City ===
On 26 July 2019, Armstrong joined newly promoted League Two outfit Salford City on a permanent transfer, signing a three-year contract. He scored his first goal against Walsall, opening the scoring in a 3–0 triumph as Salford won away for the first time in the English Football League.

On 7 December 2020, Armstrong joined Hartlepool United until the end of the 2020–21 season on loan. Armstrong scored a brace the following day on his debut for Hartlepool in a 2–0 win against King's Lynn Town. Armstrong went on to score 15 goals in all competitions for Pools, including one in their 2021 National League play-off final win against Torquay United.

=== Harrogate Town ===
On 26 June 2021 it was announced that he has signed for Harrogate Town for an undisclosed fee. Armstrong signed a new contract at the end of the 2021–22 season that would keep him at the club until the summer of 2025.

Ahead of the start of the 2023–24 season, after the club had rejected transfer bids for him, Armstrong made himself unavailable for selection. On the final day of the summer transfer window, Wrexham agreed terms with Harrogate to sign Armstrong. However, the deal was not completed before the 23:00 deadline, therefore Armstrong remained a Harrogate Town player. In a club statement, Wrexham said the "required documentation and clearance requests could not be completed in time and Armstrong's registration has been rejected".

=== Carlisle United ===
On 18 December 2023, it was announced that Armstrong would join League One club Carlisle United when the transfer window opens on 1 January 2024. The move was confirmed on 4 January 2024, Armstrong joining for an undisclosed fee on a three-and-a-half-year contract. He scored his first Carlisle goal in a 2–1 away defeat to Barnsley.

On 24 January 2025, Armstrong joined Scottish Premiership club Motherwell on loan for the remainder of the season.

== Personal life ==
Luke is the son of former Stockport County, Middlesbrough, Ipswich Town and Darlington striker Alun Armstrong. He attended Wolsingham School and is a qualified personal trainer having picked up a Level 3 qualification at Darlington College.

In December 2021, Armstrong opened a cafe in Wolsingham called No 10.

== Career statistics ==
As of match played 3 May 2026

Appearances and goals by club, season and competition
Club	Season	League			National cup (Note: Includes Scottish Cup, FA Cup)		League cup (Note: Includes Scottish League Cup, EFL Cup)		Other		Total	
Club	Season	Division	Apps	Goals	Apps	Goals	Apps	Goals	Apps	Goals	Apps	Goals
Cowdenbeath	2015–16	Scottish League One	6	0	0	0	1	0	1 (Note: Appearance in Scottish Challenge Cup)	0	8	0
Blyth Spartans	2016–17	Northern Premier League Premier Division	42	23	0	0	0	0	0	0	42	23
Middlesbrough	2017–18	Championship	0	0	0	0	0	0	3 (Note: Appearance(s) in EFL Trophy)	3	3	3
Middlesbrough	2018–19	Championship	0	0	0	0	0	0	0	0	0	0
Middlesbrough	Total		0	0	0	0	0	0	3	3	3	3
Gateshead (loan)	2018–19	National League	18	10	2	0	0	0	1 (Note: Appearance in FA Trophy)	1	21	11
Accrington Stanley (loan)	2018–19	League One	16	3	0	0	0	0	0	0	16	3
Salford City	2019–20	League Two	21	1	2	0	0	0	3	3	26	4
Salford City	2020–21	League Two	4	0	1	0	1	0	1	0	7	0
Salford City	Total		25	1	3	0	1	0	4	3	33	4
Hartlepool United (loan)	2020–21	National League	28	13	0	0	0	0	4 (Note: One appearance in FA Trophy, three appearances and two goals in National League play-offs)	2	32	15
Harrogate Town	2021–22	League Two	45	12	2	1	0	0	3	1	50	14
Harrogate Town	2022–23	League Two	46	16	2	0	1	0	2	0	51	16
Harrogate Town	2023–24	League Two	12	1	0	0	1	0	2	0	15	1
Harrogate Town	Total		103	29	4	1	2	0	7	1	116	31
Carlisle United	2023–24	League One	21	3	0	0	0	0	0	0	21	3
Carlisle United	2024–25	League Two	20	3	1	0	1	0	2	0	24	3
Carlisle United	2025–26	National League	38	11	2	1	0	0	2 (Note: One appearance in FA Trophy, one appearance in National League play-offs)	0	42	12
Carlisle United	Total		79	17	3	1	1	0	4	0	87	18
Motherwell (loan)	2024–25	Scottish Premiership	14	4	0	0	0	0	0	0	14	4
Career total			331	100	12	2	5	0	24	9	377	111

== Honours ==
Blyth Spartans

- Northern Premier League Premier Division: 2016–17

Hartlepool United

- National League play-offs: 2021
