= Matty Foulds =

English footballer

Matthew Foulds
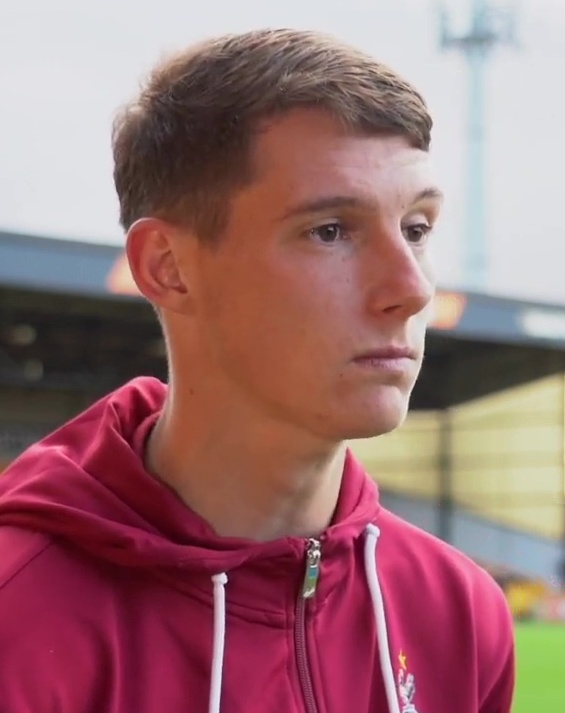

Personal information
- Full name: Matthew Colin Foulds
- Date of birth: 1 February 1998 (age 28)
- Place of birth: Bradford, England
- Position: Left back

Team information
- Current team: St Johnstone
- Number: 14

Youth career
- Bradford City
- –2015: Bury

Senior career*
Years	Team	Apps	(Gls)
2015–2016	Bury	0	(0)
2016–2020	Everton	0	(0)
2020–2021	Como	3	(0)
2021–2023	Bradford City	44	(2)
2023	→ Harrogate Town (loan)	21	(0)
2023–2025	Harrogate Town	52	(2)
2025–	St Johnstone	22	(1)
- * Club domestic league appearances and goals as of 4 May 2026

Matthew Colin Foulds (born 1 February 1998) is an English professional footballer who plays as a defender for Scottish Premiership club St Johnstone.

== Career ==
Foulds was one of five academy players who signed their first professional contracts at Bury on 18 February 2015. He was first included in a matchday squad on 22 August of that year, as the Shakers drew 3–3 away to Crewe Alexandra in League One. Three days later, he made his debut in a 1–4 loss to Premier League team Leicester City in a League Cup second-round game at Gigg Lane, replacing Chris Hussey at the start of the second half. On 1 September, Foulds made his first start, playing the entirety of a 2–1 win at Accrington Stanley in the first round of the Football League Trophy.

Premier League club Everton agreed a deal to sign Foulds on 19 November 2015 for an undisclosed fee, with the player set to move to Goodison Park at the beginning of the 2016 January transfer window.

After four years with the club, Foulds was released by Everton at the end of his contract.

In September 2020, Foulds spent time on trial with Serie C club Como and on 14 October, he signed a two-year contract with the club. On 5 January 2021, Foulds agreed to terminate his contract by mutual consent. Later that month he signed a short-term contract with hometown club Bradford City, a club he had originally played youth football for.

On 12 May 2021 he was one of four players offered a new contract by Bradford City. On 15 June 2021, he agreed a one-year contract extension with the club. He was one of seven players offered a new contract by Bradford City at the end of the 2021–22 season. Foulds signed a new two-year deal with the club on 18 May 2022.

In January 2023 he moved on loan to Harrogate Town. In June 2023, he signed permanently for Harrogate for an undisclosed fee.

On 8 May 2025, the club announced the player would be released in June when his contract expired.

In July 2025, Foulds signed a two-year deal with Scottish Championship club St Johnstone.

== Career statistics ==
As of match played 2 September 2023

Appearances and goals by club, season and competition
Club	Season	League			National cup (Note: Includes FA Cup)		League cup (Note: Includes EFL Cup)		Other		Total	
Club	Season	Division	Apps	Goals	Apps	Goals	Apps	Goals	Apps	Goals	Apps	Goals
Bury	2015–16	League One	0	0	0	0	1	0	1 (Note: Appearance in Football League Trophy)	0	2	0
Everton U21	2016–17	—			—		—		3 (Note: Appearance(s) in EFL Trophy)	0	3	0
Everton U21	2017–18	—			—		—		3	0	3	0
Everton U21	2018–19	—			—		—		1	0	1	0
Everton U21	2019–20	—			—		—		4	0	4	0
Everton U21	Total	—			—		—		11	0	11	0
Como	2020–21	Serie C	3	0	0	0	0	0	0	0	3	0
Bradford City	2020–21	League Two	3	0	0	0	0	0	0	0	3	0
Bradford City	2021–22	League Two	23	2	2	0	0	0	3	0	28	2
Bradford City	2022–23	League Two	18	0	1	0	0	0	2	0	21	0
Bradford City	Total		44	2	3	0	0	0	5	0	52	2
Harrogate Town (loan)	2022–23	League Two	21	0	0	0	0	0	0	0	21	0
Harrogate Town	2023–24	League Two	6	0	0	0	1	0	0	0	7	0
Career total			74	2	3	0	2	0	17	0	96	2

== Honours ==
Everton U23s

- Premier League Cup: 2018–19

St Johnstone

- Scottish Championship: 2025–26
