= Lewis Thomas (footballer, born 2002) =

English footballer (born 2002)

Personal information
- Full name: Lewis Luka Thomas
- Date of birth: 8 February 2002 (age 24)
- Place of birth: Leicester, England
- Position: Goalkeeper

Team information
- Current team: Harrogate Town
- Number: 13

Youth career
- Leicester City
- 2016–2019: Manchester City
- 2019–2020: Burnley

Senior career*
Years	Team	Apps	(Gls)
2020–2023	Burnley	0	(0)
2020–2021	→ AFC Fylde (loan)	0	(0)
2023–	Harrogate Town	1	(0)
- * Club domestic league appearances and goals as of 16:18, 17 November 2023 (UTC)

Lewis Luka Thomas (born 8 February 2002) is an English professional footballer who plays as a goalkeeper for National League club Harrogate Town.

== Career ==
Born in Leicester, Thomas played youth football for Leicester City, Manchester City and Burnley, and spent time on loan at non-league AFC Fylde, before signing for Harrogate Town in June 2023. Having already featured in an EFL Trophy tie, he made his league debut for the club on 28 October 2023, replacing Mark Oxley who was forced off through injury.

He was released by Harrogate at the end of the 2023–24 season.

== Career statistics ==
As of match played 4 November 2023

Appearances and goals by club, season and competition
Club	Season	League			FA Cup		League Cup		Other		Total	
Club	Season	Division	Apps	Goals	Apps	Goals	Apps	Goals	Apps	Goals	Apps	Goals
Harrogate Town	2023–24	League Two	1	0	1	0	0	0	1 (Note: Appearance(s) in EFL Trophy)	0	3	0
Career total			1	0	1	0	0	0	1	0	3	0
