= Peter Jameson =

English footballer (born 1993)

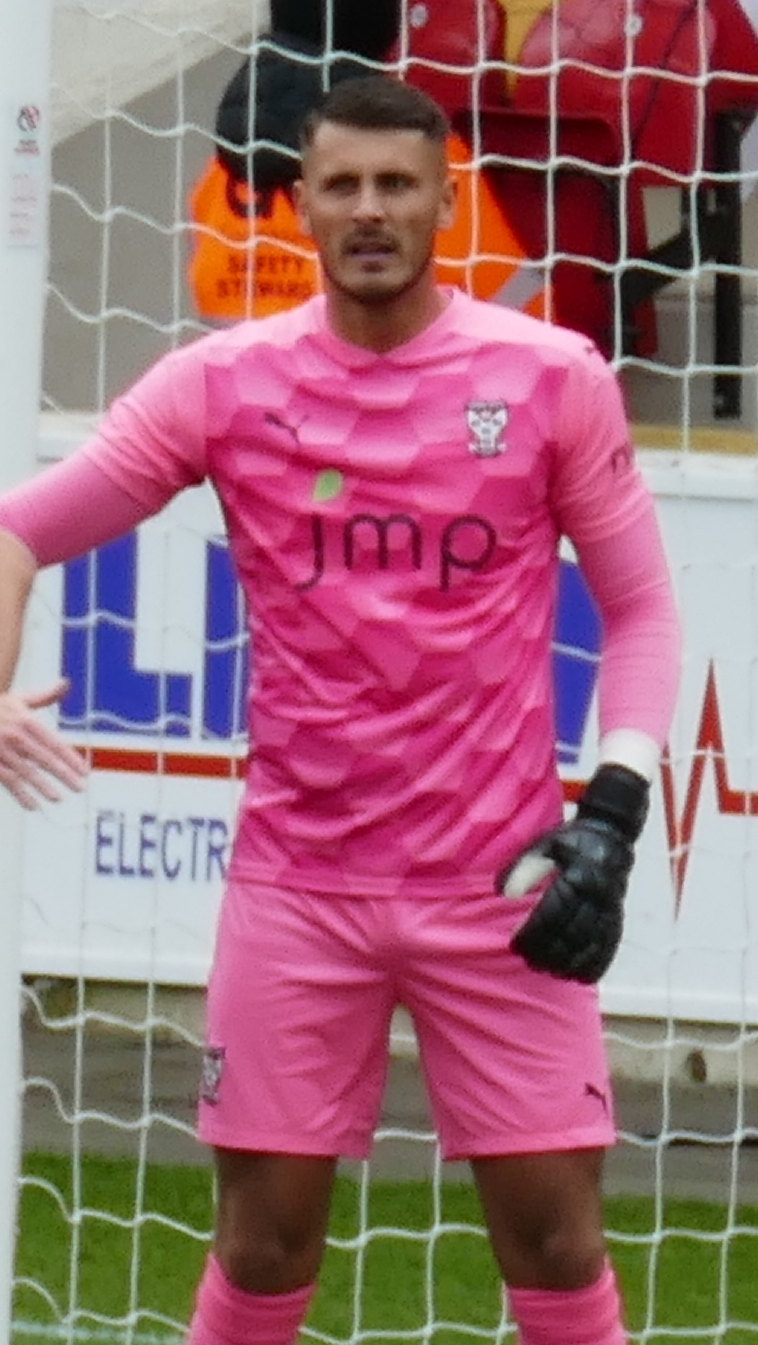
- Jameson playing for York City in 2022

Personal information
- Date of birth: 21 April 1993 (age 33)
- Place of birth: Sunderland, England
- Height: 6 ft 3 in (1.91 m)
- Position: Goalkeeper

Team information
- Current team: Gateshead
- Number: 12

Youth career
- Middlesbrough

Senior career*
Years	Team	Apps	(Gls)
- Consett
- Sunderland RCA
2013–2017	Darlington 1883	119	(0)
2017	→ South Shields (loan)		
2017–2019	Blyth Spartans	82	(0)
2019–2022	York City	93	(0)
2022–2024	Harrogate Town	27	(0)
2023–2024	→ Hartlepool United (loan)	20	(0)
2024–2025	Darlington	45	(0)
2025–	Gateshead	10	(1)
2025–2026	→ Darlington (loan)	23	(0)
2026	→ Darlington (loan)	2	(0)
- * Club domestic league appearances and goals as of 22:00, 31 August 2026 (UTC)

Peter Jameson (born 21 April 1993) is an English professional footballer who plays as a goalkeeper for National League club Gateshead. He has played in the Football League for Harrogate Town.

== Career ==
Jameson was born in Sunderland. He played youth football with Middlesbrough, where he was a training goalkeeper for the first-team players. He later played in non-league football for Consett and Sunderland Ryhope Community Association, before signing for Darlington in October 2013. He moved on loan to South Shields in March 2017. After 119 league and 12 cup appearances for Darlington, he left the club by mutual consent in August 2017 and signed for Blyth Spartans. He moved to York City in June 2019, before signing for Football League club Harrogate Town in May 2022.

On 4 July 2023, Jameson signed for Hartlepool United on a season-long loan. Having started the season as the second-choice goalkeeper behind Joel Dixon, he made his Hartlepool debut in a 2–1 home win against Wealdstone in early September. After losing his spot as number one the following month, he regained the starting position in March amidst a change of management. He made 21 appearances for Hartlepool United in total. At the end of the 2023–24 season, he was released by Harrogate.

In July 2024, Jameson returned to former club Darlington, where he was reunited with his former York manager Steve Watson, who said: "In my opinion, Pete is the best keeper at this level. When he was with me at York, he saved us numerous points, and since then, he has gained more experience in the Football League and the National League and got even better."

On 8 July 2025, Jameson joined National League side Gateshead as a player-coach. The same day however, he returned to Darlington on a season-long loan deal with a recall clause. On 6 April 2026, he rejoined Darlington on an emergency loan.

On 31 August 2026, Jameson scored a goal from his own box for Gateshead in a 2–1 defeat away to his former club Harrogate.

== Career statistics ==
As of 31 August 2026

Appearances and goals by club, season and competition
Club	Season	League			FA Cup		League Cup		Other		Total	
Club	Season	Division	Apps	Goals	Apps	Goals	Apps	Goals	Apps	Goals	Apps	Goals
Darlington 1883	2016–17 (Note: Soccerway attributes to Jameson a substitute appearance against Stalybridge Celtic on 13 March 2017 that was made by Harvey Saunders.)	National League North	22	0	0	0	0	0	0	0	22	0
Blyth Spartans	2017–18	National League North	41	0	1	0	0	0	0	0	42	0
Blyth Spartans	2018–19	National League North	41	0	4	0	0	0	5 (Note: Four appearances in FA Trophy, one in National League North play-offs)	0	50	0
Blyth Spartans	Total		82	0	5	0	0	0	5	0	92	0
York City	2019–20	National League North	34	0	2	0	0	0	2 (Note: One appearance in FA Trophy, one in National League North play-offs)	0	38	0
York City	2020–21	National League North	13	0	2	0	0	0	1 (Note: Appearance(s) in FA Trophy)	0	16	0
York City	2021–22	National League North	42	0	5	0	0	0	9 (Note: Three appearances in National League North play-offs, six in FA Trophy)	0	56	0
York City	Total		89	0	9	0	0	0	12	0	110	0
Harrogate Town	2022–23	League Two	27	0	2	0	1	0	1 (Note: Appearance(s) in EFL Trophy)	0	31	0
Harrogate Town	2023–24	League Two	0	0	0	0	0	0	0	0	0	0
Harrogate Town	Total		27	0	2	0	1	0	1	0	31	0
Hartlepool United (loan)	2023–24	National League	20	0	1	0	0	0	0	0	21	0
Darlington	2024–25	National League North	45	0	2	0	0	0	2	0	49	0
Gateshead	2025–26	National League	6	0	0	0	0	0	0	0	6	0
Gateshead	2026–27	National League	4	1	0	0	0	0	0	0	4	1
Gateshead	Total		10	1	0	0	0	0	0	0	10	1
Darlington (loan)	2025–26	National League North	25	0	4	0	0	0	0	0	29	0
Career total			298	1	23	0	1	0	20	0	342	1

== Honours ==
York City

- National League North play-offs: 2022

Individual

- York City F.C. Clubman of the Year: 2021–22
