= Stephen Dooley =

Northern Irish professional footballer (born 1991)

Personal information
- Full name: Stephen Paul Dooley
- Date of birth: 19 October 1991 (age 35)
- Place of birth: Ballymoney, Northern Ireland
- Height: 1.80 m (5 ft 11 in)
- Position: Winger

College career
Years	Team	Apps	(Gls)
2010–2013	Loyola Greyhounds		

Senior career*
Years	Team	Apps	(Gls)
2007–2010	Coleraine	20	(3)
2013–2014	Coleraine	1	(1)
2014–2016	Derry City	29	(3)
2016–2017	Cork City	53	(9)
2017–2018	Coleraine	10	(1)
2018–2022	Rochdale	113	(4)
2022–2025	Harrogate Town	54	(1)

International career
- Northern Ireland U17
- Northern Ireland U19
- * Club domestic league appearances and goals as of 14:07, 26 April 2025 (UTC)

Stephen Paul Dooley (born 19 October 1991) is a Northern Irish professional footballer who plays as a winger.

== Early life and education ==
Born in Ballymoney, Dooley grew up in Portstewart and attended Loreto College, Coleraine. Dooley is a Manchester United fan.

== Club career ==
Dooley began his career with Coleraine. He left in 2010 to play college soccer in the United States for the Loyola Greyhounds. He returned to Coleraine in 2013. He signed for Derry City in January 2014, before moving to Cork City in January 2016. He returned to Coleraine for a third spell in December 2017.

He signed for English club Rochdale in May 2018. On 19 June 2021, Dooley signed a new one-year contract.

On 14 June 2022, it was announced that Dooley would move to fellow League Two club Harrogate Town on a two-year deal, at the end of his current contract with Rochdale. He spent nearly 12 months injured, before returning to play in October 2023. He signed a new one-year contract with the club in May 2024, with Dooley citing the club's "exciting" style of play as a factor in his decision.

On 8 May 2025, the club announced the player would be released in June when his contract expired.

== International career ==
Dooley represented Northern Ireland at under-17 and under-19 levels.
