= George Horbury =

English football player

Personal information
- Full name: George Horbury
- Date of birth: 23 June 2004 (age 22)
- Place of birth: Harrogate, England
- Position: Midfielder

Team information
- Current team: Chorley
- Number: 14

Youth career
- 2021–2022: Harrogate Town

Senior career*
| Years | Team | Apps | (Gls) |
| 2022–2024 | Harrogate Town | 2 | (0) |
| 2023 | → Marske United (loan) | 23 | (2) |
| 2023 | → Buxton (loan) | 7 | (0) |
| 2024 | → Chorley (loan) | 17 | (0) |
| 2024– | Chorley | 52 | (3) |
- * Club domestic league appearances and goals as of 10:29, 9 May 2026 (UTC)

George Horbury (born 23 June 2004) is a professional footballer who plays as a central midfielder for National League North club Chorley.

Horbury began his career with his hometown club Harrogate Town who he played for in League Two. While at Harrogate, he spent time out on loan at non league sides Marske United, Buxton, and Chorley.

== Playing career ==
In June 2022, after a successful season as a youth team scholar, Horbury signed a professional contract with his hometown club Harrogate Town. Upon doing so, he became the first Harrogate academy player to sign a professional deal with the club in what was their maiden season in the Football League Youth Alliance.

On 27 August 2022, Horbury made his first appearance for the club coming on as a late substitute in a defeat to Newport County.

On 21 January 2023, it was announced George had joined Northern Premier League Premier Division side Marske United on a one-month loan deal. He scored on his debut in a 2-1 win over Ashton United. After impressing with Marske, his loan deal was extended until the end of the 2022–23 season.

On 21 November 2023, Horbury joined National League North club Buxton on an initial one-month loan deal.

In January 2024, it was announced that Horbury had joined National League North club Chorley on a loan deal until the end of the season.

At the end of the 2023–24 season, Horbury left Harrogate following the expiration of his contract. In July 2024, Horbury rejoined Chorley on a permanent deal. In September 2025, George was ruled out for the rest of the 2025–26 season due to an anterior crucial knee ligament injury.

== Honours ==
=== Individual ===
- Chorley FC Young Player of the Year 2024-25
