= Emmanuel Ilesanmi =

English footballer

Personal information
- Full name: Emmanuel Tobiloba Ilesanmi
- Date of birth: 17 November 2004 (age 21)
- Position: Forward

Team information
- Current team: Alvechurch (on loan from AFC Telford United)

Youth career
- Harrogate Town

Senior career*
Years	Team	Apps	(Gls)
2021–2024	Harrogate Town	3	(0)
2023	→ Scarborough Athletic (loan)	2	(0)
2023	→ Basford United (loan)	4	(0)
2024–2025	Derby County	0	(0)
2025	→ Torquay United (loan)	2	(0)
2025	→ Torquay United (loan)	2	(0)
2025–	AFC Telford United	3	(0)
2026–	→ Alvechurch (loan)	10	(1)
- * Club domestic league appearances and goals as of 18:48, 9 March 2026 (UTC)

Emmanuel Tobiloba Ilesanmi (born 17 November 2004) is an English professional footballer who plays as a forward for Alvechurch, on loan from AFC Telford United.

He started his career at Harrogate Town, making his debut in 2021, and spending time on loan at non-league clubs Scarborough Athletic and Basford United. In July 2024, Ilesanmi signed with Derby County, initially as an under-21 player. After two loan spells at Torquay United, Ilesanmi left Derby in the summer of 2025.

== Career ==
=== Harrogate Town ===
Ilesanmi is a graduate of the Harrogate Town Academy, and in making his first-team debut on 5 October 2021 in the EFL Trophy, became the first Academy graduate to play for the first-team. He moved on loan to Scarborough Athletic in January 2023, and to Basford United in August 2023, for whom he made 4 league appearances.

He was released by Harrogate at the end of the 2023–24 season.

=== Derby County ===
In July 2024, Ilesanmi signed with Derby County, initially as an under-21 player. In January 2025 he signed on loan for Torquay United. After a short period of injury during which he returned to home club Derby County, Ilesanmi returned on loan to Torquay United on 25 March 2025. He was released by the Rams at the end of the 2024–25 season.

=== Non-league ===
In July 2025 he signed for AFC Telford United. He later played on loan at Alvechurch.
