= 2021–22 Harrogate Town A.F.C. season =

Harrogate Town A.F.C.
2021–22 season
- Chairman: Irving Weaver
- Manager: Simon Weaver
- Stadium: Wetherby Road
- League Two: 19th
- FA Cup: Third round
- EFL Cup: First round
- EFL Trophy: Quarter-finals
- Top goalscorer: League: Jack Diamond (13); All: Jack Diamond (14)

The 2021–22 season was Harrogate Town's 108th year in their history and second consecutive season in League Two. Along with the league, the club also competed in the FA Cup, the EFL Cup and the EFL Trophy. The season covers the period from 1 July 2021 to 30 June 2022.

== Pre-season friendlies ==
Harrogate Town announced they will play friendly matches against Huddersfield Town, Brighouse Town, Newcastle United U23s, Rotherham United, Sunderland, Darlington and Doncaster Rovers as part of their pre-season preparations.

| Win | Draw | Loss |

| Date | Time | Opponent | Venue | Result (Note: Harrogate Town's score shown first) | Scorers | Attendance | Ref. |
|---|---|---|---|---|---|---|---|
| 10 July 2021 | 15:00 | Huddersfield Town | Away (Note: Match will take place at Canalside Sports Complex.) | 0–1 | | 0 | |
| 13 July 2021 | 19:30 | Brighouse Town | Away | 1–0 | Beck 74' | | |
| 18 July 2021 | 14:00 | Newcastle United U23s | Home | 2–1 | Hall 43', Martin 83' | 0 | |
| 21 July 2021 | 19:30 | Rotherham United | Home | 1–3 | Armstrong 66' | | |
| 24 July 2021 | 15:00 | Sunderland | Home | 0–4 | | 0 | |
| 27 July 2021 | 19:30 | Darlington | Away | 5–1 | Power 8', Kerry 48', Hall 50', Muldoon 61', Martin 65' | | |
| 1 August 2021 | 14:00 | Doncaster Rovers | Home | 2–3 | Muldoon 48', Armstrong 65' | 495 | |

== Competitions ==
=== League Two ===
==== League table ====
| Pos | Team | Pld | W | D | L | GF | GA | GD | Pts |
|---|---|---|---|---|---|---|---|---|---|
| 16 | Walsall | 46 | 14 | 12 | 20 | 47 | 60 | −13 | 54 |
| 17 | Hartlepool United | 46 | 14 | 12 | 20 | 44 | 64 | −20 | 54 |
| 18 | Rochdale | 46 | 12 | 17 | 17 | 51 | 59 | −8 | 53 |
| 19 | Harrogate Town | 46 | 14 | 11 | 21 | 64 | 75 | −11 | 53 |
| 20 | Carlisle United | 46 | 14 | 11 | 21 | 39 | 62 | −23 | 53 |
| 21 | Stevenage | 46 | 11 | 14 | 21 | 45 | 68 | −23 | 47 |
| 22 | Barrow | 46 | 10 | 14 | 22 | 44 | 57 | −13 | 44 |

Source: EFL Official Website
Rules for classification: 1) Points; 2) Goal difference; 3) Number of goals scored; 4) Head-to-head results; 5) Wins; 6) Away goals; 7) Penalty points (sec 9.5); 8) 12-point sending off offences

==== Results summary ====
| Overall | | | | | | | | Home | | | | | | Away | | | | | |
| Pld | W | D | L | GF | GA | GD | Pts | W | D | L | GF | GA | GD | W | D | L | GF | GA | GD |
|---|---|---|---|---|---|---|---|---|---|---|---|---|---|---|---|---|---|---|---|
| 46 | 14 | 11 | 21 | 64 | 75 | −11 | 53 | 6 | 7 | 10 | 32 | 35 | −3 | 8 | 4 | 11 | 32 | 40 | −8 |

Last updated: 7 May 2022.

==== Results by matchday ====
| Matchday | 1 | 2 | 3 | 4 | 5 | 6 | 7 | 8 | 9 | 10 | 11 | 12 | 13 | 14 | 15 | 16 | 17 | 18 | 19 | 20 | 21 | 22 | 23 | 24 | 25 | 26 | 27 | 28 | 29 | 30 | 31 | 32 | 33 | 34 | 35 | 36 | 37 | 38 | 39 | 40 | 41 | 42 | 43 | 44 | 45 | 46 |
|---|---|---|---|---|---|---|---|---|---|---|---|---|---|---|---|---|---|---|---|---|---|---|---|---|---|---|---|---|---|---|---|---|---|---|---|---|---|---|---|---|---|---|---|---|---|---|
| Ground | H | H | A | H | A | H | A | A | H | A | H | A | H | A | H | A | H | A | A | H | H | A | A | H | A | H | H | H | A | A | A | A | H | H | A | A | H | H | A | H | A | H | A | H | A | H |
| Result | W | W | W | D | W | D | L | D | D | W | W | L | D | L | L | W | L | W | D | L | L | L | L | W | L | D | W | L | D | L | W | D | D | L | L | L | D | L | W | L | L | L | L | W | W | L |
| Position | 2 | 7 | 3 | 2 | 1 | 2 | 3 | 3 | 3 | 2 | 2 | 2 | 2 | 5 | 7 | 5 | 7 | 6 | 7 | 9 | 10 | 10 | 13 | 11 | 14 | 15 | 11 | 13 | 13 | 15 | 13 | 14 | 14 | 14 | 14 | 16 | 16 | 16 | 15 | 16 | 17 | 18 | 20 | 19 | 17 | 19 |

Updated to match(es) played on 7 May 2022. Source: Statto.com
A = Away; H = Home; W = Win; D = Draw; L = Loss

==== Matches ====
Harrogate Town's fixtures were announced on 24 June 2021.

| Win | Draw | Loss | Postponed |

| Date | Time | Opponent | Venue | Result (Note: Harrogate Town's score shown first) | Scorers | Attendance | Ref. |
|---|---|---|---|---|---|---|---|
| 7 August 2021 | 15:00 | Rochdale | Home | 3–2 | Armstrong 5', Pattison 10', Burrell 90+1' | 1,841 | |
| 21 August 2021 | 15:00 | Barrow | Home | 2–1 | Pattison (2) 60', 81' | 1,564 | |
| 24 August 2021 | 19:45 | Leyton Orient | Away | 2–0 | Armstrong (2) 8', 31' | 3,942 | |
| 28 August 2021 | 15:00 | Exeter City | Home | 1–1 | Muldoon 43' (pen.) | 1,883 | |
| 4 September 2021 | 15:00 | Mansfield Town | Away | 3–1 | Armstrong 5', Muldoon 45+2', Thomson 81' | 4,599 | |
| 10 September 2021 | 19:45 | Newport County | Home | 2–2 | Muldoon 34', Armstrong 43' | 2,670 | |
| 18 September 2021 | 15:00 | Port Vale | Away | 0–2 | — | 5,435 | |
| 21 September 2021 | 19:45 | Crawley Town | Away | 2–2 | Armstrong 2', Davies 53' (o.g.) | 1,791 | |
| 25 September 2021 | 15:00 | Stevenage | Home | 0–0 | — | 1,667 | |
| 2 October 2021 | 15:00 | Oldham Athletic | Away | 2–1 | Diamond 29', Armstrong 66' | 3,729 | |
| 9 October 2021 | 15:00 | Scunthorpe United | Home | 6–1 | Muldoon (2) 8', 45+2', Pattison (2) 14', 30', Diamond 16', Orsi-Dadomo 83' (pen.) | 3,180 | |
| 16 October 2021 | 15:00 | Colchester United | Away | 0–1 | — | 2,439 | |
| 19 October 2021 | 19:45 | Tranmere Rovers | Home | 2–2 | Muldoon 39' (pen.), Armstrong 51' | 2,573 | |
| 23 October 2021 | 15:00 | Hartlepool United | Away | 2–3 | Thomson 28', Byrne 35' (o.g.) | 5,807 | |
| 30 October 2021 | 15:00 | Bristol Rovers | Home | 0–1 | — | 2,614 | |
| 13 November 2021 | 15:00 | Walsall | Away | 3–1 | Power 20', Diamond 61', Armstrong 82' | 4,651 | |
| 20 November 2021 | 15:00 | Salford City | Home | 0–2 | — | 2,814 | |
| 23 November 2021 | 19:45 | Carlisle United | Away | 2–0 | Thomson 45+1', Pattison 78' | 3,172 | |
| 27 November 2021 | 15:00 | Swindon Town | Away | 1–1 | Diamond 24' | 8,199 | |
| 7 December 2021 | 19:45 | Forest Green Rovers | Home | 1–4 | Kerry 57' | 1,619 | |
| 11 December 2021 | 15:00 | Northampton Town | Home | 1–2 | Diamond 23' | 2,166 | |
| 18 December 2021 | 15:00 | Sutton United | Away | 0–1 | — | 2,720 | |
| 15 January 2022 | 12:30 | Newport County | Away | 0–4 | — | — | |
| 22 January 2022 | 15:00 | Oldham Athletic | Home | 3–0 | Muldoon (3) 17', 73', 89' | 2,689 | |
| 29 January 2022 | 15:00 | Stevenage | Away | 0–2 | — | 2,935 | |
| 1 February 2022 | 19:45 | Mansfield Town | Home | 0–0 | — | 1,800 | |
| 5 February 2022 | 13:00 | Bradford City | Home | 2–0 | Diamond (2) 62', 71' | 2,778 | |
| 8 February 2022 | 15:00 | Crawley Town | Home | 1–3 | Diarra 61' | 1,785 | |
| 12 February 2022 | 15:00 | Rochdale | Away | 3–3 | Pattison (2) 3', 24' (pen.), Diamond 47' | 2,228 | |
| 15 February 2022 | 19:45 | Exeter City | Away | 3–4 | Armstrong 4', Muldoon 19', Thomson 64' | 3,852 | |
| 22 February 2022 | 19:45 | Bradford City | Away | 3–1 | Burrell 45+5', Page 62', Diamond 90' | 14,512 | |
| 26 February 2022 | 15:00 | Barrow | Away | 0–0 | — | 2,974 | |
| 1 March 2022 | 19:45 | Port Vale | Home | 1–1 | Pattison 23' | 2,257 | |
| 5 March 2022 | 12:30 | Hartlepool United | Home | 1–2 | Armstrong 21' | 2,638 | |
| 12 March 2022 | 15:00 | Bristol Rovers | Away | 0–3 | — | 7,884 | |
| 15 March 2022 | 19:45 | Tranmere Rovers | Away | 0–2 | — | 5,437 | |
| 19 March 2022 | 15:00 | Walsall | Home | 1–1 | Kavanagh 90+1' | 2,570 | |
| 22 March 2022 | 19:00 | Leyton Orient | Home | 0–3 | — | 2,339 | |
| 26 March 2022 | 15:00 | Scunthorpe United | Away | 3–0 | Smith (2) 22', 81', Diamond 62' | 2,317 | |
| 2 April 2022 | 15:00 | Colchester United | Home | 1–2 | Muldoon 4' | 1,615 | |
| 9 April 2022 | 15:00 | Salford City | Away | 0–2 | — | 1,670 | |
| 15 April 2022 | 15:00 | Swindon Town | Home | 1–4 | Armstrong 90+4' | 2,933 | |
| 18 April 2022 | 15:00 | Northampton Town | Away | 0–3 | — | 5,168 | |
| 23 April 2022 | 15:00 | Carlisle United | Home | 3–0 | Diamond (2) 18', 90+1', McArdle 27' | 2,707 | |
| 30 April 2022 | 15:00 | Forest Green Rovers | Away | 3–1 | Muldoon 40' (pen.), Diamond 46', Kerry 72' | 4,040 | |
| 7 May 2022 | 15:00 | Sutton United | Home | 0–2 | — | 2,484 | |

=== FA Cup ===
| Win | Draw | Loss |

| Date | Round | Time | Opponent | Venue | Result (Note: Harrogate Town's score shown first) | Scorers | Attendance | Ref. |
|---|---|---|---|---|---|---|---|---|
| 6 November 2021 | Round One | 15:00 | Wrexham | Home | 2–1 | Power 73', Orsi-Dadomo 78' | 2,403 | |
| 4 December 2021 | Round Two | 15:00 | Portsmouth | Away | 2–1 | Armstrong 44', Diamond 90+5' | 7,857 | |
| 9 January 2022 | Round Three | 12:30 | Luton Town | Away | 0–4 | — | — | |

=== EFL Cup ===
| Win | Draw | Loss | Postponed |

| Date | Round | Time | Opponent | Venue | Result | Scorers | Attendance | Ref. |
|---|---|---|---|---|---|---|---|---|
| 10 August 2021 | Round One | 19:45 | Rochdale | Home | A–W (Note: Match was postponed due to positive COVID-19 cases within the Harrogate squad.) (Note: The EFL announced in a statement Rochdale would receive a bye into Round Two, following the fixture being unable to be rearranged.) | | | |

=== EFL Trophy ===
| Pos | Div | Team | Pld | W | PW | PL | L | GF | GA | GD | Pts | Qualification |
|---|---|---|---|---|---|---|---|---|---|---|---|---|
| 1 | L1 | Sheffield Wednesday | 3 | 3 | 0 | 0 | 0 | 9 | 1 | +8 | 9 | Advance to Round 2 |
| 2 | L2 | Harrogate Town | 3 | 2 | 0 | 0 | 1 | 5 | 5 | 0 | 6 | Advance to Round 2 |
| 3 | L2 | Mansfield Town | 3 | 1 | 0 | 0 | 2 | 8 | 8 | 0 | 3 | |
| 4 | ACA | Newcastle United U21 | 3 | 0 | 0 | 0 | 3 | 3 | 11 | −8 | 0 | |

Source: EFL.com

| Win | Draw | Loss | Postponed |

| Date | Round | Time | Opponent | Venue | Result (Note: Harrogate Town's score shown first) | Scorers | Attendance | Ref. |
|---|---|---|---|---|---|---|---|---|
| 31 August 2021 | Group game 1 | 19:45 | Mansfield Town | Home | 3–1 | Orsi-Dadomo (3) 44', 53', 69' | 825 | |
| 5 October 2021 | Group game 2 | 19:45 | Newcastle United U21 | Home | 2–0 | Kerry 6', Orsi-Dadomo 45' | 920 | |
| 9 November 2021 | Group game 3 | 19:00 | Sheffield Wednesday | Away | 0–4 | — | 5,433 | |
| 21 December 2021 | Second round | 19:00 | Tranmere Rovers | Away | 2–1 | Muldoon 53', Pattison 71' | — | |
| 4 January 2022 | Third round | 19:00 | Carlisle United | Home | 1–0 | Armstrong 7' | 928 | |
| 25 January 2022 | Quarter-finals | 19:45 | Sutton United | Away | 0–1 | — | 1,499 | |

== Transfers ==
=== Transfers in ===
| Date | Position | Nationality | Name | From | Fee | Ref. |
|---|---|---|---|---|---|---|
| 26 June 2021 | FW | (England) | Luke Armstrong | (England) Salford City | Undisclosed | |
| 1 July 2021 | DF | (Northern Ireland) | Rory McArdle | (England) Exeter City | Free transfer | |
| 1 July 2021 | FW | (England) | Danilo Orsi-Dadomo | (England) Maidenhead United | Free transfer | |
| 1 July 2021 | GK | (England) | Mark Oxley | (England) Southend United | Free transfer | |
| 1 July 2021 | MF | (England) | Alex Pattison | (England) Wycombe Wanderers | Free transfer | |
| 16 July 2021 | DF | (England) | Lewis Page | (England) Exeter City | Free transfer | |
| 16 July 2021 | DF | (England) | Nathan Sheron | (England) Fleetwood Town | Free transfer | |
| 11 January 2022 | CB | (England) | Leon Legge | (England) Port Vale | Undisclosed | |

=== Loans in ===
| Date from | Position | Nationality | Name | From | Date until | Ref. |
|---|---|---|---|---|---|---|
| 31 August 2021 | FW | (England) | Jack Diamond | (England) Sunderland | End of season | |
| 4 January 2022 | MF | (England) | Josh Austerfield | (England) Huddersfield Town | End of season | |
| 4 January 2022 | MF | (France) | Brahima Diarra | (England) Huddersfield Town | End of season | |
| 13 January 2022 | CB | (Republic of Ireland) | Lewis Richards | (England) Wolverhampton Wanderers | End of season | |
| 28 January 2022 | CF | (Republic of Ireland) | Calum Kavanagh | (England) Middlesbrough | End of season | |

=== Loans out ===
| Date from | Position | Nationality | Name | To | Date until | Ref. |
|---|---|---|---|---|---|---|
| 1 July 2021 | MF | (England) | Joe Leesley | (England) Boston United | End of season | |
| 16 July 2021 | MF | (England) | Connor Kirby | (England) Altrincham | 3 January 2022 | |
| 23 July 2021 | FW | (Scotland) | Mark Beck | (England) York City | January 2022 | |
| 1 January 2022 | FW | (England) | Danilo Orsi-Dadomo | (England) Boreham Wood | End of season | |
| 24 January 2022 | CF | (England) | Aaron Martin | (England) FC Halifax Town | End of season | |

=== Transfers out ===
| Date | Position | Nationality | Name | To | Fee | Ref. |
|---|---|---|---|---|---|---|
| 1 July 2021 | MF | (England) | Scott Brown | Retired | | |
| 1 July 2021 | DF | (England) | Edward Francis | (England) Notts County | Released | |
| 1 July 2021 | FW | (England) | Brendan Kiernan | (England) Walsall | Released | |
| 1 July 2021 | DF | (England) | Jake Lawlor | (England) Hartlepool United | Released | |
| 1 July 2021 | MF | (Scotland) | Calvin Miller | (England) Chesterfield | Released | |
| 1 July 2021 | GK | (England) | Melvin Minter | (England) Chesterfield | Released | |
| 1 July 2021 | FW | (England) | Jon Stead | Retired | | |
| 1 July 2021 | DF | (England) | Jay Williams | (England) Banbury United | Released | |
| 16 July 2021 | DF | (England) | Kevin Lokko | (England) Aldershot Town | Free transfer | |
| 19 July 2021 | MF | (England) | Tom Walker | (England) Stockport County | Free transfer | |
| 23 July 2021 | GK | (England) | James Belshaw | (England) Bristol Rovers | Undisclosed | |
| 11 January 2022 | CB | (England) | Connor Hall | (England) Port Vale | Undisclosed | |
