= 2020–21 Harrogate Town A.F.C. season =

Harrogate Town
2020–21 season
- Chairman: Irving Weaver
- Manager: Simon Weaver
- Stadium: Keepmoat Stadium (until 6 October); Wetherby Road
- League Two: 17th
- FA Cup: Second round
- EFL Cup: Second round
- EFL Trophy: Group stage
- Top goalscorer: League: Jack Muldoon (15); All: Jack Muldoon (15)
Home colours	Away colours

The 2020–21 season was the first season Harrogate Town played in the Football League following their promotion from the National League in the previous season. They competed in League Two, the fourth tier of English football, alongside the FA Cup, EFL Cup, and EFL Trophy. The club began the season at the Keepmoat Stadium in Doncaster, South Yorkshire, whilst a grass pitch was installed at their traditional Wetherby Road stadium in Harrogate, North Yorkshire.

== Background ==
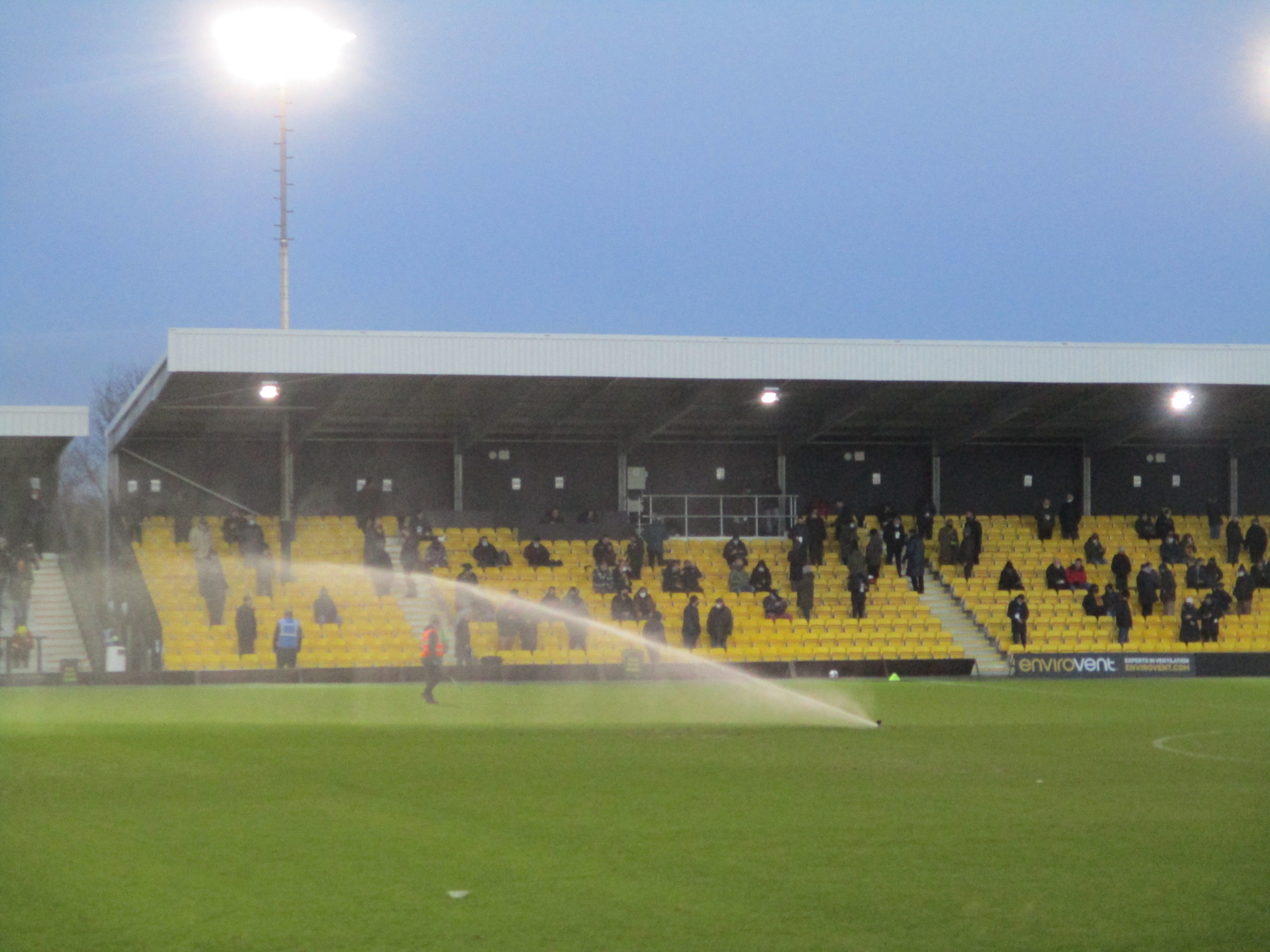
A socially distanced crowd at Wetherby Road in December 2020.

The 2019–20 season saw Harrogate Town finish second in the National League, and thus qualified for the play-offs. They defeated Boreham Wood 1–0 in the semi-final, before a 3–1 victory over Notts County in the final secured Harrogate's promotion to the Football League for the first time in their history.

Since the EFL require all matches to be played on grass pitches, the club played all their home matches for the first month of the season at Doncaster Rovers' Keepmoat Stadium whilst the club replaced their synthetic pitch at Wetherby Road.

At the end of June 2020, defenders Maxim Kouogun, George Smith and Matty Taylor were all released following the expiry of their contracts, whilst the contract of midfielder Sam Jones was terminated with immediate effect.

== Transfers ==
=== Transfers in ===
Date	Position	Name	Previous club (Note: Brackets around club names denote the player's contract with that club had expired before he joined Harrogate)	Fee	Ref.
11 August 2020	MF	Connor Kirby	Sheffield Wednesday	Free transfer	
11 August 2020	DF	Jake Lawlor	(Wales) Wrexham	Free transfer	
13 August 2020	MF	Tom Walker	AFC Fylde	Undisclosed	
14 August 2020	DF	Kevin Lokko	Dover Athletic	Free transfer	
11 September 2020	GK	Melvin Minter	Kings Langley	Free transfer	
3 October 2020	DF	Calvin Miller	(Scotland) Celtic	Free transfer	
15 December 2020	DF	Ed Francis	No club	Free transfer	
7 January 2021	DF	Jay Williams	Kettering Town	Undisclosed	
18 January 2021	MF	Simon Power	Norwich City	Undisclosed	

=== Loans in ===
Date from	Position	Name	From	Date until	Ref.
11 September 2020	DF	Dan Jones	Salford City	End of season	
5 January 2021	FW	Josh March	Forest Green Rovers	11 March 2021	
6 January 2021	MF	William Hondermarck	Norwich City	End of season	
8 January 2021	FW	Josh McPake	(Scotland) Rangers	End of season	
8 January 2021	DF	Mitchell Roberts	Birmingham City	End of season	
1 February 2021	FW	Josh Andrews	Birmingham City	End of season	

=== Loans out ===
Date from	Position	Name	To	Date until	Ref.
25 September 2020	MF	Scott Brown	Warrington Town	End of season	
23 October 2020	GK	Melvin Minter	Darlington	16 January 2021	
10 November 2020	MF	Joe Leesley	Boston United	End of season	
30 November 2020	MF	Tom Walker	Notts County	3 January 2021	
11 January 2021	MF	Calvin Miller	Notts County	End of season	
21 April 2021	MF	Connor Kirby	Altrincham	End of season	

=== Transfers out ===
Date	Position	Name	To	Fee	Ref.
26 September 2020	MF	Liam Agnew	Blyth Spartans	Mutual consent	
28 September 2020	DF	Matt Taylor	Warrington Town	Free transfer	
7 January 2021	MF	Jack Emmett	No club	Retired	

== Friendly matches ==
Win	Draw	Loss

Date	Time	Opponent	Venue	Result (Note: Harrogate Town's score shown first)	Scorers	Attendance	Ref.
21 August 2020	16:00	Middlesbrough U23	Away	2–0	Falkingham 27', Muldoon 30'	0 (Note: Match played behind closed doors)	
25 August 2020	19:45	Brighouse Town	Away	0–0	—	200	
29 August 2020	15:00	Sunderland	Away	0–1	—	0	

== Competitions ==
=== League Two ===
==== League table ====
Pos	Team	Pld	W	D	L	GF	GA	GD	Pts
13	Port Vale	46	17	9	20	57	57	0	60
14	Stevenage	46	14	18	14	41	41	0	60
15	Bradford City	46	16	11	19	48	53	−5	59
16	Mansfield Town	46	13	19	14	57	55	+2	58
17	Harrogate Town	46	16	9	21	52	61	−9	57
18	Oldham Athletic	46	15	9	22	72	81	−9	54
19	Walsall	46	11	20	15	45	53	−8	53
20	Colchester United	46	11	18	17	44	61	−17	51
21	Barrow	46	13	11	22	53	59	−6	50

Updated to match(es) played on 31 May 2021. Source: EFL Official Website
Rules for classification: 1) Points; 2) Goal difference; 3) Number of goals scored; 4) Head-to-head results; 5) Wins; 6) Away goals; 7) Penalty points (sec 9.5); 8) 12-point sending off offences

==== Results summary ====
Overall								Home						Away					
Pld	W	D	L	GF	GA	GD	Pts	W	D	L	GF	GA	GD	W	D	L	GF	GA	GD
46	16	9	21	52	61	−9	57	8	5	10	24	29	−5	8	4	11	28	32	−4

Last updated: 8 May 2021.
Source: BBC Sport

==== Results by round ====
Matchday	1	2	3	4	5	6	7	8	9	10	11	12	13	14	15	16	17	18	19	20	21	22	23	24	25	26	27	28	29	30	31	32	33	34	35	36	37	38	39	40	41	42	43	44	45	46
Ground	A	H	A	H	A	H	A	A	H	A	H	H	A	A	H	H	A	A	H	A	A	H	A	A	H	A	H	H	A	H	H	A	A	H	A	H	H	A	H	A	H	H	H	A	H	A
Result	W	D	D	L	W	W	W	L	D	L	L	D	L	W	L	L	L	W	L	W	L	D	D	L	W	W	L	W	L	W	W	W	L	W	L	L	L	D	L	L	D	W	L	D	W	L
Position	1	3	6	12	8	7	4	6	8	11	14	12	14	12	15	17	17	17	17	16	18	18	18	20	20	14	15	13	15	13	12	11	11	10	11	13	15	15	16	17	17	16	17	17	16	17

Updated to match(es) played on 30 April 2021. Source: 11v11
A = Away; H = Home; W = Win; D = Draw; L = Loss

==== Matches ====
The League Two fixtures were announced on 21 August 2020, with Harrogate's first fixture being away to Southend United.

Win	Draw	Loss

Date	Time	Opponent	Venue	Result	Scorers	Attendance	Referee	Ref.
12 September 2020	15:00	Southend United	Away	4–0	Muldoon (2) 25', 69', Kerry 44', Martin 60'	0	Antony Coggins	
19 September 2020	15:00	Walsall	Home (Note: Match played at the Keepmoat Stadium.)	2–2	Martin 32', Muldoon 42'	0	James Adcock	
26 September 2020	15:00	Port Vale	Away	0–0		0	Ben Toner	
3 October 2020	15:00	Bolton Wanderers	Home	1–2	Thomson 61'	0	Ben Speedie	
12 October 2020	19:45	Bradford City	Away	1–0	Kerry 74'	0	Darren Drysdale	
17 October 2020	15:00	Barrow	Home	1–0	Muldoon 22'	0	Declan Bourne	
20 October 2020	19:45	Grimsby Town	Away	2–1	Muldoon (2) 25', 43'	0	Seb Stockbridge	
24 October 2020	15:00	Colchester United	Away	1–2	Stead 61'	0	Will Finnie	
27 October 2020	19:00	Stevenage	Home	0–0		0	Graham Salisbury	
31 October 2020	15:00	Newport County	Away	1–2	Smith 44'	0	Paul Howard	
3 November 2020	19:00	Tranmere Rovers	Home	0–1		0	Ross Joyce	
14 November 2020	15:00	Crawley Town	Home	1–1	Muldoon 85'	0	Martin Coy	
21 November 2020	15:00	Leyton Orient	Away	0–3		0	Neil Hair	
24 November 2020	19:00	Mansfield Town	Away	1–0	Miller 27'	0	Carl Boyeson	
1 December 2020	19:00	Scunthorpe United	Home	2–5	Muldoon 35', Hall 90+2'	0	Paul Howard	
5 December 2020	15:00	Forest Green Rovers	Home	0–1		410	Marc Edwards	
12 December 2020	15:00	Morecambe	Away	0–1		0	Ollie Yates	
15 December 2020	19:45	Exeter City	Away	2–1	Kiernan 31', Muldoon 75'	1,559	Lee Swabey	
19 December 2020	15:00	Salford City	Home	0–1		495	Trevor Kettle	
26 December 2020	15:00	Oldham Athletic	Away	2–1	Thomson (2) 30', 71'	0	Ben Speedie	
9 January 2021	15:00	Cambridge United	Away	1–2	Muldoon 10'	0	Carl Brook	
19 January 2021	19:00	Exeter City	Home	0–0		0	Scott Oldham	
22 January 2021	19:00	Salford City	Away	2–2	Muldoon 37', Francis 90+3'	0	Marc Edwards	
26 January 2021	19:00	Tranmere Rovers	Home	2–3	McPake 25', March 72'	0	Andy Haines	
30 January 2021	15:00	Newport County	Home	2–1	March 34', Martin 66'	0	Christopher Pollard	
6 February 2021	15:00	Crawley Town	Away	3–1	Martin 13', March 30' (pen.), Power 45+3'	0	Dean Whitestone	
9 February 2021	18:00	Cheltenham Town	Home	0–1		0	Graham Salisbury	
16 February 2021	19:00	Carlisle United	Home	1–0	March 28' (pen.)	0	Seb Stockbridge	
20 February 2021	15:00	Scunthorpe United	Away	1–3	March 27' (pen.)	0	John Busby	
23 February 2021	19:00	Mansfield Town	Home	1–0	Martin 46'	0	Ross Joyce	
27 February 2021	15:00	Grimsby Town	Home	1–0	Beck 77'	0	Trevor Kettle	
2 March 2021	19:00	Barrow	Away	1–0	Muldoon 84'	0	Robert Lewis	
6 March 2021	15:00	Stevenage	Away	0–1		0	Scott Oldham	
9 March 2021	19:00	Colchester United	Home	3–0	Beck 1', Smith 45+1', McPake 56'	0	Simon Mather	
13 March 2021	15:00	Forest Green Rovers	Away	1–2	Williams 90+1'	0	Christopher Pollard	
20 March 2021	15:00	Morecambe	Home	0–1		0	Josh Smith	
27 March 2021	15:00	Southend United	Home	0–1		0	Leigh Doughty	
2 April 2021	15:00	Walsall	Away	0–0		0	Will Finnie	
5 April 2021	15:00	Port Vale	Home	0–2		0	Rebecca Welch	
10 April 2021	15:00	Bolton Wanderers	Away	1–2	Beck 13'	0	Sam Allison	
13 April 2021	19:00	Leyton Orient	Home	2–2	Jones 58', McPake 74'	0	Anthony Backhouse	
17 April 2021	12:30	Bradford City	Home	2–1	Muldoon 22', McPake 89'	0	James Adcock	
20 April 2021	19:00	Oldham Athletic	Home	0–3		0	Carl Boyeson	
24 April 2021	15:00	Carlisle United	Away	1–1	Muldoon 11'	0	Chris Sarginson	
30 April 2021	19:00	Cambridge United	Home	5–4	Kiernan (3) 9, 20, 32' (pen.), Beck 13', Lokko 84'	0	Ollie Yates	
8 May 2021	15:00	Cheltenham Town	Away	1–4	Muldoon 7'	0	Ben Speedie	

=== FA Cup ===
The draw for the first round was made on 26 October. The second round draw was revealed on Monday, 9 November by Danny Cowley.

Win	Draw	Loss

Round	Date	Time	Opponent	Venue	Result	Scorers	Attendance	Referee	Ref.
First round	6 November 2020	19:45	Skelmersdale United	Home	4–1	Miller 1', Beck 45+3', Lawlor 68', Martin 73'	0	Bobby Madley	
Second round	28 November 2020	15:00	Blackpool	Home	0–4	—	0	James Oldham	

=== EFL Cup ===
Win	Draw	Loss

The first round draw was made live on Sky Sports on 18 August 2020, with Harrogate being drawn away to fellow League Two side Tranmere Rovers, with the match set to be played on 5 September 2020. The draw for both the second and third round were confirmed on September 6, live on Sky Sports by Phil Babb.

Round	Date	Time	Opponent	Venue	Result	Scorers	Attendance	Referee	Ref.
First round	5 September 2020	15:00	Tranmere Rovers	Away	1–1 (8–7 p)	Kerry 69'	0	Tom Nield	
Second round	16 September 2020	18:00	West Bromwich Albion	Away	0–3		0	Thomas Bramall	

=== EFL Trophy ===
Win	Draw	Loss

The regional group stage draw was confirmed on 18 August.

Pos	Div	Team	Pld	W	PW	PL	L	GF	GA	GD	Pts	Qualification
1	L1	Hull City	3	2	0	0	1	6	2	+4	6	Advance to Round 2
2	ACA	Leicester City U21	3	2	0	0	1	6	5	+1	6	Advance to Round 2
3	L2	Harrogate Town	3	1	0	1	1	5	5	0	4	
4	L2	Grimsby Town	3	0	1	0	2	3	8	−5	2	

Source: EFL.com

Round	Date	Time	Opponent	Venue	Result	Scorers	Attendance	Referee	Ref.
Group stage	8 September 2020	19:45	Grimsby Town	Away	2–2 (4–5 p)	Kiernan 81', Lokko 86'	0	James Bell	
Group stage	6 October 2020	19:45	Leicester City U21	Home	3–1	Stead 16', Jones 20', Kiernan 58'	0	Andy Haines	
Group stage	10 November 2020	19:00	Hull City	Home	0–2		0	Peter Wright	

== Statistics ==
=== Appearances and goals ===
Last updated 9 May 2021.

No.	Pos	Nat	Player	Total		EFL League Two		EFL Cup		EFL Trophy		FA Cup	
No.	Pos	Nat	Player	Apps	Goals	Apps	Goals	Apps	Goals	Apps	Goals	Apps	Goals
Goalkeepers
1	GK	(England) ENG	James Belshaw	40	0	38	0	0	0	1	0	1	0
13	GK	(England) ENG	Joe Cracknell	13	0	8	0	2	0	2	0	1	0
25	GK	(England) ENG	Melvin Minter	0	0	0	0	0	0	0	0	0	0
Defenders
2	DF	(England) ENG	Ryan Fallowfield	34	0	31	0	2	0	1	0	0	0
3	DF	(England) ENG	Dan Jones	25	2	21	1	1	0	2	1	1	0
5	DF	(England) ENG	Will Smith	35	2	32	2	2	0	1	0	0	0
6	DF	(England) ENG	Warren Burrell	50	0	43	0	2	0	3	0	2	0
12	DF	(England) ENG	Jake Lawlor	21	1	17	0	0	0	2	0	2	1
20	DF	(England) ENG	Connor Hall	44	1	41	1	2	0	0	0	1	0
22	DF	(England) ENG	Ed Francis	21	1	21	1	0	0	0	0	0	0
26	DF	(England) ENG	Kevin Lokko	8	2	3	1	0	0	3	1	2	0
27	DF	(England) ENG	Jay Williams	7	1	7	1	0	0	0	0	0	0
29	DF	(England) ENG	Mitchell Roberts	4	0	4	0	0	0	0	0	0	0
Midfielders
4	MF	(England) ENG	Josh Falkingham	47	0	43	0	2	0	0	0	2	0
7	MF	(England) ENG	George Thomson	52	3	46	3	2	0	2	0	2	0
8	MF	(England) ENG	Jack Emmett (retired)	1	0	0	0	0	0	1	0	0	0
8	MF	(Republic of Ireland) IRL	William Hondermarck	3	0	3	0	0	0	0	0	0	0
14	MF	(England) ENG	Brendan Kiernan	35	6	30	4	0	0	3	2	2	0
15	MF	(England) ENG	Connor Kirby (out on loan)	22	0	16	0	1	0	3	0	2	0
17	MF	(England) ENG	Lloyd Kerry	37	3	31	2	2	1	3	0	1	0
19	MF	(Scotland) SCO	Calvin Miller (out on loan)	13	2	10	1	0	0	1	0	2	1
21	MF	(England) ENG	Scott Brown (out on loan)	0	0	0	0	0	0	0	0	0	0
23	MF	(England) ENG	Tom Walker	11	0	7	0	1	0	3	0	0	0
24	MF	(England) ENG	Liam Agnew (released)	1	0	1	0	0	0	0	0	0	0
28	MF	(Scotland) SCO	Josh McPake	22	4	22	4	0	0	0	0	0	0
30	MF	(Republic of Ireland) IRL	Simon Power	13	1	13	1	0	0	0	0	0	0
Forwards
9	FW	(Scotland) SCO	Mark Beck	32	5	26	4	2	0	2	0	2	1
10	FW	(England) ENG	Aaron Martin	42	6	36	5	2	0	3	0	1	1
11	FW	(England) ENG	Joe Leesley (out on loan)	0	0	0	0	0	0	0	0	0	0
16	FW	(England) ENG	Jon Stead	24	2	19	1	2	0	3	1	0	0
18	FW	(England) ENG	Jack Muldoon	47	15	42	15	2	0	1	0	2	0
24	FW	(England) ENG	Josh March (loan expired)	13	5	13	5	0	0	0	0	0	0
31	FW	(England) ENG	Josh Andrews	3	0	3	0	0	0	0	0	0	0

=== Top scorers ===
Includes all competitive matches. The list is sorted by squad number when total goals are equal.

Last updated 9 May 2021.

Rank	Position	Nationality	No.	Player	EFL League Two	EFL Cup	EFL Trophy	FA Cup	Total
1	FW	(England)	18	Jack Muldoon	15	0	0	0	15
2	FW	(England)	10	Aaron Martin	5	0	0	1	6
2	MF	(England)	14	Brendan Kiernan	4	0	2	0	6
3	FW	(Scotland)	9	Mark Beck	4	0	0	1	5
3	FW	(England)	24	Josh March	5	0	0	0	5
4	FW	(Scotland)	28	Josh McPake	4	0	0	0	4
5	MF	(England)	7	George Thomson	3	0	0	0	3
5	MF	(England)	17	Lloyd Kerry	2	1	0	0	3
6	DF	(England)	3	Dan Jones	1	0	1	0	2
6	DF	(England)	5	Will Smith	2	0	0	0	2
6	FW	(England)	16	Jon Stead	1	0	1	0	2
6	MF	(Scotland)	19	Calvin Miller	1	0	0	1	2
6	DF	(England)	26	Kevin Lokko	1	0	1	0	2
7	DF	(England)	12	Jake Lawlor	0	0	0	1	1
7	DF	(England)	20	Connor Hall	1	0	0	0	1
7	DF	(England)	22	Ed Francis	1	0	0	0	1
7	DF	(England)	27	Jay Williams	1	0	0	0	1
7	FW	(Republic of Ireland)	30	Simon Power	1	0	0	0	1
	Own goals				0	0	0	0	0
	TOTALS				51	1	5	4	61

=== Cleansheets ===
Includes all competitive matches. The list is sorted by squad number when total cleansheets are equal.

Last updated 9 May 2021.

Rank	Position	Nationality	No.	Player	EFL League Two	EFL Cup	EFL Trophy	FA Cup	Total
1
1	GK	(England)	1	James Belshaw	11	0	0	0	11
2
2	GK	(England)	13	Joe Cracknell	2	0	0	0	2
TOTALS					13	0	0	0	13

=== Disciplinary record ===
Includes all competitive matches.

Last updated 9 May 2021.

Position	Nationality	Number	Name	League Two		EFL Cup		EFL Trophy		FA Cup		Total	
Position	Nationality	Number	Name	Booked	Sent off (straight red)	Booked	Sent off (straight red)	Booked	Sent off (straight red)	Booked	Sent off (straight red)	Booked	Sent off (straight red)
MF	(England)	4	Josh Falkingham	8	1	0	0	0	0	1	0	9	1
DF	(England)	6	Warren Burrell	7	1	0	0	0	0	1	0	8	1
MF	(England)	17	Lloyd Kerry	6	1	0	0	0	0	1	0	7	1
DF	(England)	5	Will Smith	2	1	1	0	1	0	0	0	4	1
DF	(England)	20	Connor Hall	3	1	0	0	0	0	0	0	3	1
DF	(England)	3	Dan Jones	4	0	0	0	0	0	1	0	5	0
DF	(England)	2	Ryan Fallowfield	3	0	0	0	0	0	0	0	3	0
FW	(England)	10	Aaron Martin	3	0	0	0	0	0	0	0	3	0
MF	(England)	15	Connor Kirby	3	0	0	0	0	0	0	0	3	0
MF	(England)	7	George Thomson	3	0	0	0	0	0	0	0	3	0
DF	(England)	22	Ed Francis	2	0	0	0	0	0	0	0	2	0
FW	(England)	24	Josh March	2	0	0	0	0	0	0	0	2	0
DF	(England)	12	Jake Lawlor	1	0	0	0	0	0	0	0	1	0
DF	(England)	27	Jay Williams	1	0	0	0	0	0	0	0	1	0
DF	(England)	29	Mitchell Roberts	1	0	0	0	0	0	0	0	1	0
MF	(Scotland)	28	Josh McPake	1	0	0	0	0	0	0	0	1	0
DF	(England)	26	Kevin Lokko	0	0	0	0	1	0	0	0	1	0
MF	(Scotland)	19	Calvin Miller	0	0	0	0	0	0	1	0	1	0
			TOTALS	50	5	1	0	2	0	5	0	58	5
