= 2020 National League play-off final =

- The match took place at Wembley Stadium.
- Event: 2019–20 National League
Harrogate Town	Notts County
3	1
- Date: 2 August 2020
- Venue: Wembley Stadium, London
- Referee: James Bell
- Attendance: 0 (Note: The final was played behind closed doors due to the COVID-19 pandemic in the United Kingdom.)

The 2020 National League play-off final, known as the Vanarama National League Promotion Final for sponsorship reasons, was a football match contested between Harrogate Town and Notts County to determine the second and final team to gain promotion from the National League to EFL League Two. It was played on 2 August 2020 at Wembley Stadium in London. The first-placed team of the 2019–20 National League season (Barrow) gained automatic promotion to the League Two, while the teams placed from fourth to seventh in the table took part in play-off quarter-finals and teams placed second and third received byes to the semi-finals. The winners of the quarter-finals advanced to play the teams in the semi-finals and the winners of these semi-finals competed for the final place in League Two. The match was refereed by James Bell and played behind closed doors to comply with restrictions during the coronavirus pandemic.

Harrogate Town took the lead in the fifth-minute with a goal from George Thomson and 23 minutes later Connor Hall doubled the lead. The first half ended with Harrogate leading 2–0. In a minute of the second half Notts County halved the deficit with a free-kick from Callum Roberts, but a goal on 70 minutes from Jack Diamond restored Harrogate's two-goal advantage which they maintained to the final whistle, winning 3–1 to earn promotion to League Two and the English Football League for the first time in their history.

== Route to the final ==
National League final table, leading positions
Pos	Team	Pld	W	D	L	GF	GA	GD	Pts	PPG
1	Barrow	37	21	7	9	68	39	+29	70	1.89
2	Harrogate Town	37	19	9	9	61	44	+17	66	1.78
3	Notts County	38	17	12	9	61	38	+23	63	1.66
4	Yeovil Town	37	17	9	11	61	44	+17	60	1.62
5	Boreham Wood	37	16	12	9	55	40	+15	60	1.62
6	FC Halifax Town	37	17	7	13	50	49	+1	58	1.57
7	Barnet	35	14	12	9	52	42	+10	54	1.54

Because of the COVID-19 pandemic, the National League season was temporarily suspended on 13 March. Two weeks later this suspension was extended indefinitely. On 22 April, clubs in National League, the fifth tier of the English football league system, voted to curtail the season, meaning the final table would be calculated by a points-per-game method. The play-offs would then be played between the clubs finishing second to seventh as normal.

Harrogate Town finished the season in second place in the revised league table, one place ahead of Notts County. Both therefore missed out on the one automatic place for promotion to EFL League Two, which went to Barrow. This meant Harrogate Town, Notts County, Yeovil Town (who finished fourth), Boreham Wood (fifth), FC Halifax Town (sixth) and Barnet (seventh) took part in the play-offs to determine the second promoted team. Harrogate Town and Notts County received byes to the semi-finals to face the winners of the quarter-finals. The winners of the quarter-finals were Boreham Wood, who beat Halifax Town 2–1, and Barnet, who beat Yeovil Town 2–0.

Harrogate Town's opponents in their play-off semi-final were Boreham Wood, the match being played on 25 July 2020 at Wetherby Road, Harrogate. Jack Muldoon scored the only goal of the game with a header on the 64th-minute and Harrogate progressed to the final. Notts County faced Barnet in the other play-off semi-final, the match taking place on the same day as the other on 25 July 2020 at Meadow Lane, Nottingham. A goal either side of half time, first a header from Kristian Dennis in the 37th-minute and one from Callum Roberts in the 59th, meant Notts County won 2–0 and they qualified for the final.

== Match ==
=== Details ===
2 August 2020
15:00

Harrogate Town	3–1	Notts County
Thomson 5'; Hall 28'; Diamond 70'	Report	Roberts 46'

Wembley Stadium, London
Attendance: 0
Referee: James Bell

Harrogate Town	Notts County

GK	1	(England) James Belshaw
DF	2	(England) Ryan Fallowfield
DF	6	(England) Warren Burrell
DF	4	(England) Josh Falkingham
DF	22	(England) Will Smith
DF	20	(England) Connor Hall	(yellow card) 59'
MF	7	(England) George Thomson
MF	17	(England) Lloyd Kerry	(yellow card) 83'
FW	25	(England) Aaron Martin		(substituted off) 61'
FW	18	(England) Jack Muldoon		(substituted off) 86'
FW	23	(England) Jack Diamond
Substitutes:
GK	13	(England) Joe Cracknell
MF	8	(England) Jack Emmett
MF	11	(England) Joe Leesley
FW	9	(Scotland) Mark Beck		(substituted on) 86'
FW	16	(England) Jon Stead		(substituted on) 61'
FW	28	(England) Kian Harratt
Manager:
(England) Simon Weaver

GK	1	(England) Sam Slocombe
DF	5	(England) Ben Turner
DF	20	(England) Richard Brindley		(substituted off) 87'
DF	31	(England) Alex Lacey
DF	33	(England) Joel Bagan	(yellow card) 27'
MF	4	(England) Mitch Rose
MF	6	(Republic of Ireland) Jim O'Brien		(substituted off) 46'
MF	8	(Republic of Ireland) Michael Doyle
FW	9	(England) Kristian Dennis		(substituted off) 46'
FW	14	(England) Kyle Wootton
FW	37	(England) Callum Roberts	(yellow card) 53'
Substitutes:
GK	40	(England) Joe McDonnell
DF	13	(Wales) Connell Rawlinson
DF	16	(England) Dion Kelly-Evans		(substituted on) 87'
MF	22	(England) Tom Crawford
FW	7	(England) Wes Thomas		(substituted on) 46'
FW	11	(Netherlands) Enzio Boldewijn		(substituted on) 46'
Manager:
(England) Neal Ardley
