= 2020 FA Trophy final =

2020 FA Trophy Final
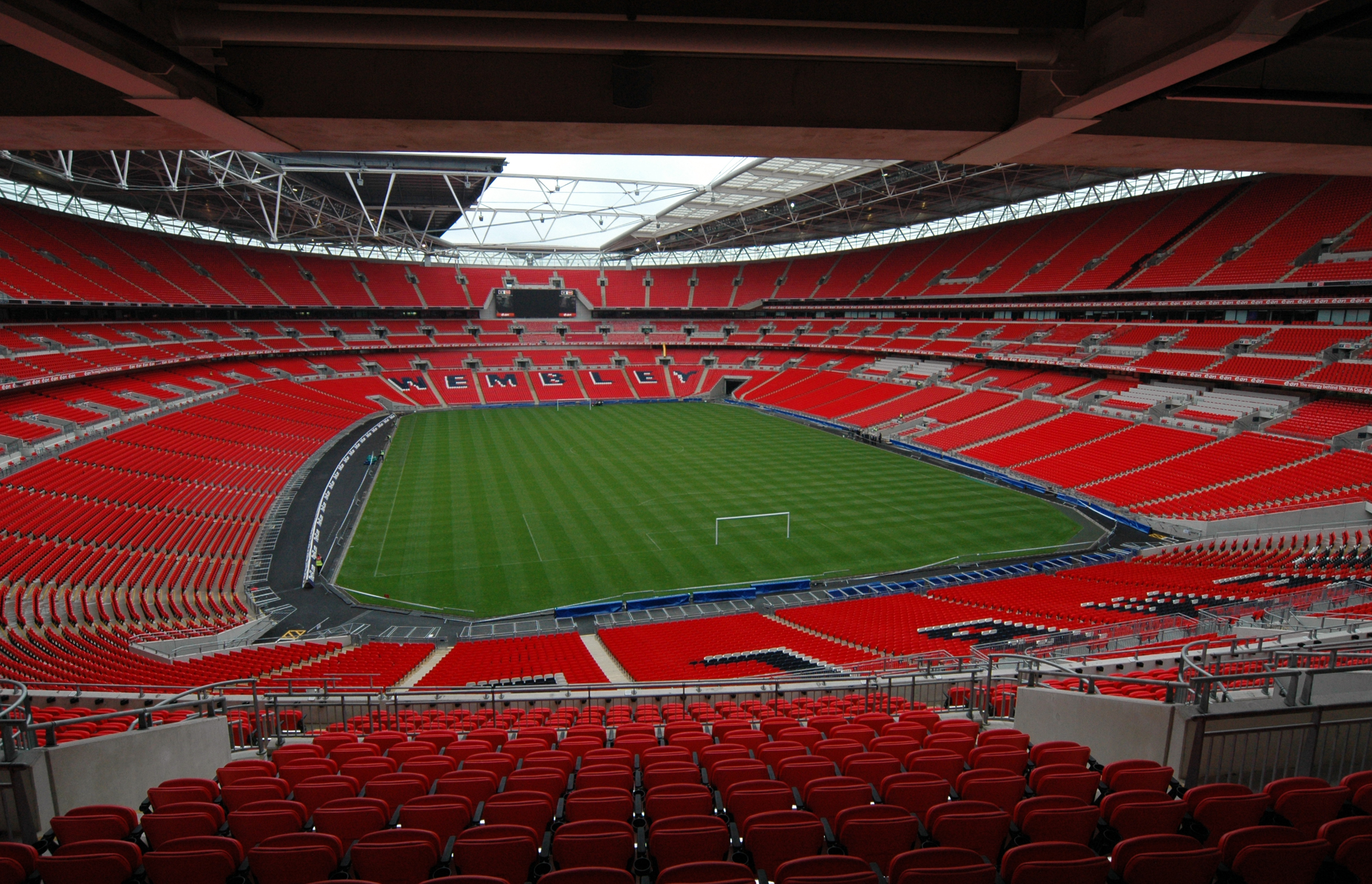
- Wembley Stadium hosted the final
- Event: 2019–20 FA Trophy
Concord Rangers	Harrogate Town
0	1
- Date: 3 May 2021
- Venue: Wembley Stadium, London
- Attendance: 0

The 2020 FA Trophy Final was a football match between Concord Rangers and Harrogate Town on 3 May 2021 which Harrogate won 1–0 with a goal from Josh Falkingham. It was the final match of the 2019–20 FA Trophy, the 51st season of the FA Trophy.

The final was rescheduled for 27 September 2020 however this was postponed as the FA hoped to have spectators in the final. The date was then agreed for 3 May 2021 behind closed doors as a suitable solution could not be reached to be played with fans.

The match was broadcast live and free-to-air on BT Sport. Presenter Matt Smith was joined by pundits Danny Cowley and Nicky Cowley, with Jeff Brazier as the sideline reporter. The commentary team consisted of Adam Summerton and Adam Virgo. Radio commentary was provided by BBC Essex and BBC Radio York.

Before the match, soprano Emily Haig sang "God Save the Queen". Players from both teams took a knee immediately prior to kick-off, in support of the No Room For Racism campaign.

Owing to being promoted out of the National League after the postponement of the final, Harrogate made history by becoming the first Football League side to win the trophy. They held the cup for less than three weeks, as the 2021 final took place on 22 May.

== Route to the Final ==
=== Harrogate Town ===
14 December 2019 First round	Harrogate Town	3–2	Hartlepool United	Harrogate
15:00 GMT	Kioso 77' (o.g.); Hall 86'; Kiernan 90+3'		Hamilton 10'; Donaldson 45+2'	Stadium: Wetherby Road; Attendance: 803

11 January 2020 Second round	Darlington	0–2	Harrogate Town	Darlington
15:00 GMT			Diamond 32'; Kerry 86'	Stadium: Blackwell Meadows; Attendance: 1240

8 February 2020 Third round	Harrogate Town	2–0	Eastleigh	Harrogate
15:00 GMT	Bradley 23'; Emmett 86'			Stadium: Wetherby Road; Attendance: 947

29 February 2020 Fourth round	AFC Fylde	2–3 (a.e.t.)	Harrogate Town	Wesham
15:00 GMT	Williams 53'; Burke 90+3'		Kerry 73'; Muldoon 74', 102'	Stadium: Mill Farm; Attendance: 803

22 September 2020 Semi-Final	Notts County	0–1	Harrogate Town	Nottingham
15:00 GMT			Smith 45+1'	Stadium: Meadow Lane; Attendance: 0

=== Concord Rangers ===
23 November 2019 Third round qualifying	Concord Rangers	0–0	Slough Town	Canvey Island
15:00 GMT				Stadium: Thames Road

26 November 2019 Third round qualifying Replay	Slough Town	2–3	Concord Rangers	Slough
19:45 GMT	Harris 38', 54'		Krasniqi 9', 90'; Green 73' (pen.)	Stadium: Arbour Park

14 December 2019 First round	Maidstone United	2–3	Concord Rangers	Maidstone
15:00 GMT	Temelci 14'; McClure 19'		Elliott 35'; Reynolds 82'; Green 87'	Stadium: Gallagher Stadium

11 January 2020 Second round	Concord Rangers	1–1	Bath City	Canvey Island
15:00 GMT	Pollock 77'		Smith 79'	Stadium: Thames Road

28 January 2020 Second round replay	Bath City	1–2	Concord Rangers	Twerton, Bath
19:45 GMT	Brunt 24' (pen.)		Roast 15'; Nouble 88'	Stadium: Twerton Park

8 February 2020 Third round	Concord Rangers	2–2 (a.e.t.) (4–3 p)	Leamington	Canvey Island
15:00 GMT	Reynolds 5'; Blanchfield 95'		Morley 60'; Maycock 105'	Stadium: Thames Road; Attendance: 417
	Penalties
	Cawley (penalty scored); Green (penalty missed); Nouble (penalty scored); O'Donoghue (penalty scored); Sherriff (penalty scored)		Storer (penalty missed); Morley (penalty scored); Lane (penalty scored); Gittings (penalty scored); Edwards (penalty missed)

3 March 2020 Fourth round	Concord Rangers	2–1 (a.e.t.)	Royston Town	Canvey Island
19:45 GMT	Nouble 35'; Sherriff 93'		Warner-Eley 54'	Stadium: Thames Road

5 September 2020 Semi-Final	Concord Rangers	2–1	Halesowen Town	Canvey Island
15:00 GMT	Evans 38' (o.g.); Wall 80'		Gregory 7'	Stadium: Thames Road

== Match ==
=== Details ===
3 May 2021
17:00

Concord Rangers	0–1	Harrogate Town (Note: Between the fourth round and the semi-finals, Harrogate were promoted to the Football League through the National League play-offs after the season had finished on an average points-per-game basis due to curtailment as a result of the COVID-19 pandemic.)
	Report	Falkingham 76'

Wembley Stadium, London
Attendance: 0
Referee: Peter Bankes

GK	1	(England) Chris Haigh
RB	2	(England) Aron Pollock
CB	4	(England) Billy Roast	(substituted off) 83'
CB	5	(Grenada) Tyrone Sterling (c)
CB	6	(England) Jack Cawley
LB	3	(England) Joe Payne
CM	7	(England) James Blanchfield	(substituted off) 79'
CM	8	(England) Sam Blackman
CM	10	(England) Lewis Simper
FW	17	(Jamaica) Lamar Reynolds
FW	11	(England) Ryan Charles	(substituted off) 59'
Substitutes:
GK	13	(England) Dan Wilks
DF	2	(England) Archie McFadden
MF	14	(Spain) Odei Martin Sorondo	(substituted on) 83'
FW	9	(England) Alex Wall	(substituted on) 79'
FW	15	(England) Ben Search
FW	18	(England) Alex Hernandez
FW	19	(England) Temi Babalola	(substituted on) 59'
Manager: (England) Danny Scopes

GK	13	(England) Joe Cracknell
RB	6	(England) Warren Burrell
CB	5	(England) Will Smith
CB	20	(England) Connor Hall
LB	3	(England) Dan Jones	(substituted off) 62'
RM	7	(England) George Thomson
CM	17	(England) Lloyd Kerry
CM	4	(England) Josh Falkingham (c)
LM	28	(Scotland) Josh McPake	(substituted off) 67'
FW	18	(England) Jack Muldoon
FW	16	(England) Jon Stead	(substituted off) 61'
Substitutes:
GK	1	(England) James Belshaw
DF	2	(England) Ryan Fallowfield	(substituted on) 62'
DF	22	(England) Ed Francis
DF	26	(England) Kevin Lokko
DF	27	(England) Jay Williams
MF	14	(England) Brendan Kiernan	(substituted on) 67'
FW	9	(Scotland) Mark Beck	(substituted on) 61'
Manager: (England) Simon Weaver

Man of the match: Chris Haigh (Concord Rangers)

Match officials

- Assistant referees:

James Mainwaring
Timothy Wood

- Fourth official:

Marc Edwards

Match rules

- 90 minutes.
- 30 minutes of extra-time if necessary.
- Penalty shoot-out if scores still level.
- Seven named substitutes.
- Maximum of three substitutions plus one more allowed in extra time
