= Mitchell Roberts =

English footballer (born 2000)

Personal information
- Full name: Mitchell Anthony Roberts
- Date of birth: 16 September 2000 (age 26)
- Place of birth: Hagley, England
- Position: Defender

Team information
- Current team: Worcester City

Youth career
- 2011–2020: Birmingham City

Senior career*
Years	Team	Apps	(Gls)
2020–2023	Birmingham City	1	(0)
2021	→ Harrogate Town (loan)	4	(0)
2022	→ Carlisle United (loan)	6	(0)
2022–2023	→ Oldham Athletic (loan)	9	(0)
2023	→ Solihull Moors (loan)	9	(1)
2023–2024	Oxford City	17	(0)
2024–2025	Boston United	7	(0)
2025–2026	Hereford	6	(0)
2025–2026	→ Gloucester City (loan)	10	(0)
2026	→ Halesowen Town (loan)	10	(0)
2026–	Worcester City	7	(0)
- * Club domestic league appearances and goals as of 09:56, 17 September 2026 (UTC)

Mitchell Anthony Roberts (born 16 September 2000) is an English semi-professional footballer who plays as a defender for Worcester City.

Roberts began his career as a youngster with Birmingham City. He made his Football League debut while on loan to Harrogate Town of League Two in 2021, and spent the second half of the 2021–22 season with another League Two club, Carlisle United. He moved on loan to National League team Oldham Athletic for the first half of the 2022–23 season, and spent the second half with divisional rivals Solihull Moors. He was released by Birmingham in 2023, joined Oxford City a couple of months into the new season, and signed for his fourth National League club, Boston United, in 2024.

== Early and personal life ==
Roberts was born in Hagley, Worcestershire, where he attended Haybridge High School. He was a childhood fan of West Bromwich Albion.

== Career ==
=== Early career ===
Roberts joined Birmingham City's Academy as a 10-year-old in 2011, having previously played Sunday League football, and took up a two-year scholarship in July 2017. His first year was interrupted by a knee injury, but he was able to move into the development squad in his second. He was offered a two-year professional contract in March 2019, and signed it in June.

Rumours in the 2019 summer transfer window linked Roberts with a move to then Premier League champions Manchester City and Scottish Premiership champions Celtic, and it was reported that Birmingham were willing to sell "at the right price". He did not leave, played 18 times for Birmingham's under-23 team during the abbreviated 2019–20 season, and signed a two-year professional contract in July 2020.

He was used in pre-season friendlies ahead of the 2020–21 season, but was not listed among those allocated a squad number.

=== Harrogate Town loan ===
Roberts joined League Two newcomers Harrogate Town on 8 January 2021 on loan until the end of the 2020–21 season. He made his club and Football League debut the next day, starting at left back in a 2–1 defeat away to Cambridge United. He played for 54 minutes, during which he received a yellow card for a bad tackle, before being replaced by Jay Williams because of a hamstring injury. He received treatment at Birmingham before returning to Harrogate towards the end of March, and next appeared in the first team on 20 April, playing the whole of a 3–0 home defeat. He played twice more, finishing his loan spell with four appearances.

=== Return to Birmingham ===
Roberts made his first-team debut for Birmingham in the EFL Cup second-round match at home to Fulham. Starting in a three-man defence alongside the experienced George Friend and fellow debutant Dion Sanderson, he played the whole of the 2–0 defeat. Roberts made his first Championship appearance on 7 November 2021 when, with five senior defenders unavailable through injury, he started on the left of a back three in a 2–1 defeat at home to Reading.

=== Carlisle United loan ===
Having made no further appearances for Birmingham, Roberts signed on loan for League Two club Carlisle United on 31 January 2022. He made his debut on 12 February, starting in a back three in a 2–2 draw away to Colchester United described by the News and Star as a "grim struggle". He finished the season with six appearances.

=== Oldham Athletic loan ===
Roberts signed for National League club Oldham Athletic on 25 August 2022, on loan until 1 January 2023. He made his debut the next day in the starting eleven for the match at home to Aldershot, which Oldham won with a stoppage-time goal. Manager John Sheridan described him as "excellent, very elegant, technically very good, comfortable on the ball." He was a regular in the starting eleven until a knee injury sustained in an FA Cup tie against Chester in mid-October kept him out for the rest of the loan spell.

=== Solihull Moors loan ===
Roberts joined another National League club, Solihull Moors, on 30 January 2023 on loan until the end of the season. He scored away to Altrincham in February, catching the goalkeeper off his line from 40 yards (37 m), but the hosts won the match 4–1. Roberts started all five of Moors' unbeaten matches in March, but made only four other appearances for the club.

Roberts was one of 13 professionals released by Birmingham at the end of the 2022–23 season.

=== Non-league ===
Roberts joined National League club Oxford City in October 2023. He had made 20 appearances in all competitions by the end of the season.

In July 2024, Roberts joined Boston United, newly promoted to the National League. He was released at the end of the season after eight appearances in all competitions.

On 10 June 2025, Roberts joined National League North club Hereford. On 17 October, he joined Southern League Premier Division South club Gloucester City on a one-month loan. He was released by the club at the end of the 2025–26 season.

On 3 July 2026, Roberts joined Southern Football League Premier Division Central club Worcester City.

== Career statistics ==
As of end of 2025–26 season

Appearances and goals by club, season and competition
Club	Season	League			FA Cup		EFL Cup		Other		Total	
Club	Season	Division	Apps	Goals	Apps	Goals	Apps	Goals	Apps	Goals	Apps	Goals
Birmingham City	2020–21	Championship	0	0	0	0	0	0	—		0	0
Birmingham City	2021–22	Championship	1	0	0	0	1	0	—		2	0
Birmingham City	2022–23	Championship	0	0	0	0	0	0	—		0	0
Birmingham City	Total		1	0	0	0	1	0	—		2	0
Harrogate Town (loan)	2020–21	League Two	4	0	—		—		—		4	0
Carlisle United (loan)	2021–22	League Two	6	0	—		—		—		6	0
Oldham Athletic (loan)	2022–23	National League	9	0	1	0	—		0	0	10	0
Solihull Moors (loan)	2022–23	National League	9	1	—		—		—		9	1
Oxford City	2023–24	National League	17	0	2	0	—		1 (Note: Appearance in FA Trophy)	0	20	0
Boston United	2024–25	National League	7	0	0	0	—		1	0	8	0
Hereford	2025–26	National League North	6	0	1	0	—		0	0	7	0
Gloucester City (loan)	2025–26	SL Premier Division South	10	0	0	0	—		0	0	10	0
Halesowen Town (loan)	2025–26	SL Premier Division Central	10	0	—		—		1 (Note: Appearance in Southern League Premier Division Central play-offs)	0	11	0
Career total			79	1	4	0	1	0	3	0	87	1
