= Joe Leesley =

English footballer (born 1994)

Personal information
- Full name: Joe Sydney Leesley
- Date of birth: 29 March 1994 (age 32)
- Place of birth: Sheffield, England
- Height: 6 ft 0 in (1.82 m)
- Positions: Winger; defensive midfielder

Youth career
- 2004–2010: Doncaster Rovers

Senior career*
Years	Team	Apps	(Gls)
2011–2012	Winterton Rangers		
2012–2015	Matlock Town		
2015–2016	Alfreton Town	49	(2)
2016–2022	Harrogate Town	122	(22)
2019–2020	→ Stockport County (loan)	10	(0)
2020	→ Stevenage (loan)	8	(0)
2020–2021	→ Boston United (loan)	9	(3)
2021–2022	→ Boston United (loan)	34	(3)
2022	Boston United	10	(0)
2022	→ Darlington (loan)	7	(1)
2022–2024	Kidderminster Harriers	27	(2)
2024	Scunthorpe United	0	(0)
2024–2025	Darlington	5	(0)
2024–2025	→ Worksop Town (loan)	18	(3)
2025–2026	Worksop Town	26	(0)
2026	Matlock Town	1	(0)

International career
2016	England C	1	(0)
- * Club domestic league appearances and goals as of 14:16, 30 May 2026 (UTC)

Joe Sydney Leesley (born 29 March 1994) is an English former professional footballer who played as a winger and defensive midfielder.

He previously played in the Football League for Stevenage and has played for England C, the team that represents the country at non-league level.

== Career ==
Leesley was born in Sheffield, South Yorkshire. He was on the books of Doncaster Rovers from the age of 10, but was not given a scholarship when he reached 16. He spent his early career with Winterton Rangers, Matlock Town, Alfreton Town, Harrogate Town and Stockport County, moving on loan to Stevenage on 6 January 2020. He made his debut two days later in the EFL Trophy. In November 2020 he moved on loan to Boston United. In June 2021, after Leesley agreed a season loan to Boston United, Harrogate manager Simon Weaver said he would be unlikely to play for his parent club again. Leesley made 34 league appearances during his loan across the 2021–22 season, and was released at the end of the season.

On 1 August 2022, Leesley signed for Boston United on a permanent deal having left Harrogate Town. In October, he joined league rivals Darlington on loan for a month. After an impressive seven-match spell during which he demonstrated versatility and leadership, both he and Darlington wanted to extend the loan, but Boston would only allow him to leave for a fee, which put him out of their reach. Leesley signed for another National North club, Kidderminster Harriers, on 18 November 2022, on a contract to run until the end of the 2023–24 season. After his time with the club was disrupted by injury, he left by mutual consent in February 2024.

On 1 April 2024, Leesley joined National League North club Scunthorpe United on a short-term deal until the end of the season, but made no first-team appearances. He rejoined Darlington on a one-year contract on 24 May 2024, but was unable to establish himself in the first team, and signed on a month's loan for Northern Premier League Premier Division club Worksop Town on 15 November. He remained on loan until 25 March 2025, when his Darlington contract was cancelled by mutual consent, and three days later he joined Worksop Town on a contract to run until the end of the 2025–26 season.

On 28 May 2026, Leesley returned to Northern Premier League Division One East club Matlock Town. He left Matlock on 17 August 2026. He retired a day later.

== Playing style ==
Primarily a winger, he later played as a defensive midfielder.

== Career statistics ==
As of end of 2025–26 season

Appearances and goals by club, season and competition
Season	Club	League			FA Cup		EFL Cup		Other		Total	
Season	Club	Division	Apps	Goals	Apps	Goals	Apps	Goals	Apps	Goals	Apps	Goals
Alfreton Town	2014–15	Conference Premier	11	0	0	0	—		0	0	11	0
Alfreton Town	2015–16	National League North	38	2	2	0	—		1 (Note: Appearance(s) in FA Trophy)	0	41	2
Alfreton Town	Total		49	2	2	0	—		1	0	52	2
Harrogate Town	2016–17	National League North	42	5	4	2	—		4	2	50	9
Harrogate Town	2017–18	National League North	39	14	4	1	—		8 (Note: Six appearances and six goals in FA Trophy, two appearances and one goal in National League North play-offs)	7	51	22
Harrogate Town	2018–19	National League	35	2	2	0	—		3 (Note: Two appearances in FA Trophy, one in National League play-offs)	0	40	2
Harrogate Town	2019–20	National League	6	1	0	0	—		0	0	6	1
Harrogate Town	2020–21	League Two	0	0	0	0	0	0	0	0	0	0
Harrogate Town	Total		122	22	10	3	0	0	15	9	147	34
Stockport County (loan)	2019–20	National League	10	0	1	0	—		0	0	11	0
Stevenage (loan)	2019–20	League Two	8	0	0	0	0	0	2 (Note: Appearances in EFL Trophy)	0	10	0
Boston United (loan)	2020–21	National League North	9	3	0	0	—		3	1	12	4
Boston United (loan)	2021–22	National League North	34	3	3	2	—		2	0	39	5
Boston United	2022–23	National League North	10	0	3	0	—		0	0	13	0
Boston United	Total		53	6	6	2	—		5	1	64	9
Darlington (loan)	2022–23	National League North	7	1	0	0	—		0	0	7	1
Kidderminster Harriers	2022–23	National League North	13	1	—		—		5 (Note: Two appearances in FA Trophy, three in National League North play-offs)	0	18	1
Kidderminster Harriers	2023–24	National League	14	1	0	0	—		0	0	14	1
Kidderminster Harriers	Total		27	2	0	0	—		5	0	32	2
Scunthorpe United	2023–24	National League North	0	0	—		—		0	0	0	0
Darlington	2024–25	National League North	5	0	1	0	—		0	0	6	0
Worksop Town (loan)	2024–25	Northern Premier League Premier Division	18	3	—		—		2 (Note: One appearance in FA Trophy, one in Sheffield & Hallamshire Senior Cup)	0	20	3
Worksop Town	2024–25	Northern Premier League Premier Division	4	0	—		—		2 (Note: Two appearances in Northern Premier League Premier Division play-offs)	0	6	0
Worksop Town	2025–26	National League North	22	0	1	0	—		2	0	25	0
Worksop Town	Total		44	3	1	0	0	0	6	0	51	3
Career total			325	36	21	5	0	0	34	10	380	51

== Honours ==
Harrogate Town

- National League play-offs: 2019–20

Kidderminster Harriers

- National League North play offs: 2019–20

Worksop Town

- Northern Premier League Premier Division play-offs: 2024–25
