= Tom Walker (footballer) =

English footballer (born 1995)

Personal information
- Full name: Thomas James Walker
- Date of birth: 12 December 1995 (age 30)
- Place of birth: Salford, England
- Height: 6 ft 0 in (1.82 m)
- Position: Midfielder

Team information
- Current team: Chorley
- Number: 17

Youth career
- 2005–2015: Bolton Wanderers

Senior career*
Years	Team	Apps	(Gls)
2015–2017	Bolton Wanderers	18	(1)
2016–2017	→ Bury (loan)	11	(0)
2017	Stockport County	5	(0)
2017–2018	FC United of Manchester	10	(1)
2018–2020	Salford City	60	(11)
2019–2020	→ Stockport County (loan)	15	(5)
2020	AFC Fylde	9	(4)
2020–2021	Harrogate Town	7	(0)
2020	→ Notts County (loan)	5	(0)
2021	→ Stockport County (loan)	21	(1)
2021	Stockport County	5	(0)
2021	→ Altrincham (loan)	2	(0)
2022	→ AFC Fylde (loan)	17	(0)
2022–2024	AFC Fylde	32	(2)
2023–2024	→ Buxton (loan)	5	(0)
2024–2025	Radcliffe	40	(6)
2025–	Chorley	24	(1)

International career^{‡}
2018	England C	2	(1)
- * Club domestic league appearances and goals as of 13:17, 26 April 2026 (UTC) ‡ National team caps and goals as of 19:54, 11 October 2018 (UTC)

Thomas James Walker (born 12 December 1995) is an English professional footballer who plays as a midfielder for Chorley.

Walker started his career at Bolton Wanderers, and made his first team debut in January 2015. He joined Bury on loan in August 2016, and was released from Bolton at the end of the 2016–17 season. He has since played for Stockport County and F.C. United of Manchester amongst a host of other clubs.

== Career ==
Walker joined the academy at Bolton Wanderers at the age of nine, and made his Football League debut ten years later when manager Neil Lennon sent him on as a late substitute for Eiður Guðjohnsen in a 1–1 draw with Leeds United at the Macron Stadium on 10 January 2015. He scored his first senior goal for the "Trotters" in a 1–1 draw with local rivals Wigan Athletic on 21 March. He ended the 2014–15 season with one goal in 11 Championship matches, and signed his first professional contract in May 2015. He featured a further eight times across the 2015–16 relegation campaign.

On 31 August 2016, Walker joined EFL League One rivals Bury on a season-long loan. Manager David Flitcroft revealed how Walker had been on his way to join Leyton Orient on loan when the pair spoke over the phone, Walker was convinced to instead join Bury and he left his car in London and took a train to Manchester to sign with Bury. He scored his first goal for the "Shakers" in a 2–1 defeat at Bradford City in an EFL Trophy match on 4 October. He did not feature for four months before he was introduced as a half-time substitute in a 2–1 defeat at Oxford United on 28 March; after the game manager Lee Clark said "Tom has got lots of ability. He just needs to learn the other side of the game". He made 15 appearances at Gigg Lane across the 2016–17 campaign, but made just one league start. He was released by Bolton manager Phil Parkinson in May 2017.

Walker had undergone a trial at Port Vale in July 2017 but subsequently was not offered a deal by manager Michael Brown. On 25 August 2017, he moved to Stockport County on a short-term deal following a successful trial spell with The Hatters.

He left Stockport on 6 October 2017 after his short-term deal had ended to sign for FC United of Manchester.

On 4 January 2018 Salford City confirmed that they had agreed a deal to sign Walker.

In October 2019 he joined Stockport County on loan until January 2020. He returned to Salford in January 2020 on the expiry of his loan period. The following day he joined AFC Fylde on a permanent, two-and-a-half-year contract. He joined newly promoted League Two side Harrogate Town in August 2020 after they triggered a release clause in his contract. On 30 November 2020, Walker joined National League side Notts County on loan until 3 January 2021, with manager Neal Ardley revealing he had already tried to sign him on two occasions but missing out. On 12 February 2021, he rejoined Stockport on another loan deal.

On 17 July 2021, Walker returned to National League side Stockport, this time on a permanent deal, signing a one-year deal with the club. In October 2021, Walker joined National League side Altrincham on a one-month loan deal. In January 2022, Walker returned to AFC Fylde on loan until the end of the season.

On 30 June 2022, Walker agreed to return to AFC Fylde on a permanent basis. In September 2023, he joined Buxton on an initial four-month loan deal. He departed Fylde at the end of the 2023–24 season.

On 16 May 2024, Walker joined newly promoted National League North club Radcliffe on a one-year deal with the option for a further year.

In July 2025, Walker joined fellow National League North side Chorley.

== Career statistics ==
As of end of 2023–24 season

Appearances and goals by club, season and competition
Club	Season	League			FA Cup		League Cup		Other		Total	
Club	Season	Division	Apps	Goals	Apps	Goals	Apps	Goals	Apps	Goals	Apps	Goals
Bolton Wanderers	2014–15	Championship	11	1	0	0	0	0	0	0	11	1
Bolton Wanderers	2015–16	Championship	7	0	0	0	1	0	0	0	8	0
Bolton Wanderers	2016–17	League One	0	0	0	0	1	0	0	0	1	0
Bolton Wanderers	Total		18	1	0	0	2	0	0	0	20	1
Bury (loan)	2016–17	League One	11	0	2	0	0	0	2 (Note: Appearance(s) in the EFL Trophy)	1	15	1
Stockport County	2017–18	National League North	5	0	0	0	—		0	0	5	0
FC United of Manchester	2017–18	National League North	10	1	1	0	—		0	0	11	1
Salford City	2017–18	National League North	18	6	0	0	—		0	0	18	6
Salford City	2018–19	National League	40	5	3	0	—		1 (Note: Appearance(s) in the FA Trophy)	0	44	5
Salford City	2019–20	League Two	4	0	0	0	0	0	1	0	5	0
Salford City	Total		62	11	3	0	0	0	2	0	67	11
Stockport County (loan)	2019–20	National League	15	4	1	0	—		1	1	17	5
AFC Fylde	2019–20	National League	9	4	0	0	—		0	0	9	4
Harrogate Town	2020–21	League Two	7	0	1	0	1	0	3	0	12	0
Notts County (loan)	2020–21	National League	5	0	0	0	—		1	0	6	0
Stockport County (loan)	2020–21	National League	21	1	0	0	—		1 (Note: Appearance in the National League play-offs)	0	22	1
Stockport County	2021–22	National League	5	0	0	0	—		0	0	5	0
Altrincham (loan)	2021–22	National League	2	0	0	0	—		0	0	2	0
AFC Fylde (loan)	2021–22	National League North	17	0	0	0	—		0	0	17	0
AFC Fylde	2022–23	National League North	17	2	7	1	—		0	0	24	3
AFC Fylde	2023–24	National League	15	0	0	0	—		1	0	16	0
AFC Fylde	AFC Fylde total		49	2	7	1	0	0	1	0	57	3
Buxton (loan)	2023–24	National League North	5	0	0	0	—		0	0	5	0
Career total			219	24	15	1	3	0	10	2	237	27

== Honours ==
Salford City

- National League play-offs: 2019
