= Kevin Lokko =

English footballer (born 1995)

Personal information
- Full name: Kevin Adom Lokko
- Date of birth: 3 November 1995 (age 30)
- Place of birth: Poplar, London, England
- Height: 6 ft 3 in (1.91 m)
- Position: Centre-back

Team information
- Current team: Folkestone Invicta

Youth career
- 2012–2014: Norwich City

Senior career*
Years	Team	Apps	(Gls)
2014–2015	Colchester United	0	(0)
2015–2016	Welling United	38	(1)
2016–2017	Maidstone United	41	(4)
2017–2018	Stevenage	2	(0)
2017–2018	→ Dagenham & Redbridge (loan)	25	(2)
2018	→ Dover Athletic (loan)	12	(1)
2018–2020	Dover Athletic	66	(9)
2020–2021	Harrogate Town	3	(1)
2021–2022	Aldershot Town	7	(0)
2022–2023	Farnborough	45	(2)
2023–2025	Maidenhead United	55	(8)
2025–	Folkestone Invicta	45	(7)

International career
2017	England C	2	(0)
- * Club domestic league appearances and goals as of 18:16, 25 August 2026 (UTC)

Kevin Adom Lokko (born 3 November 1995) is an English footballer who plays as a centre-back for National League South club Folkestone Invicta.

He began his career in the academy at Norwich City, featuring in the FA Youth Cup-winning team during the 2012–13 season. He was released in May 2014 and joined Colchester United four months later, although injury prevented him from making any first-team appearances. Lokko gained his first experience of regular senior football with National League club Welling United during the 2015–16 season and subsequently spent the following season with fellow National League club Maidstone United.

In August 2017, Lokko joined League Two club Stevenage, spending time on loan at Dagenham & Redbridge and Dover Athletic. The latter move was made permanent in June 2018, where he served as club captain during the 2019–20 season. He briefly returned to the Football League with Harrogate Town in August 2020, before having season-long spells with Aldershot Town and Farnborough. He joined Maidenhead United of the National League in May 2023, scoring eight goals in 59 appearances across two seasons before signing for Folkestone Invicta in May 2025.

== Early life ==
Born in Poplar, London, Lokko grew up in Romford in Essex. His father is from Ghana, and his mother is from Ukraine. Owing to his mother's Ukrainian heritage, Lokko grew up speaking Russian. He attended Easton College in Norwich, where he studied sports performance and business studies.

== Club career ==
=== Early career ===
Lokko joined Norwich City's academy at the age of 15, signing a two-year deal as an academy scholar in the summer of 2012. He spent two years playing regularly for Norwich's under-18 team and was part of the FA Youth Cup-winning squad during the 2012–13 season. Lokko was released by the club upon the expiry of his scholarship contract in May 2014. He went on trial at Colchester United in July 2014, playing in several under-21 matches as well as in the first team's final pre-season friendly ahead of the 2014–15 season. The trial proved successful, and Lokko signed a one-year deal on 19 August 2014, with the club stating he would join up with the under-21 squad to further his development. Although he began training with the first team and was an unused substitute in two first-team matches in the opening months of the season, Lokko sustained a hip injury that kept him out of action for five months, and he did not make any appearances during the season. He was released when his contract expired in May 2015.

=== Welling United ===
Ahead of the 2015–16 season, on 20 July 2015, Lokko signed a one-year contract with National League club Welling United. The move came after he had featured in the club's opening two pre-season fixtures and was subsequently offered a contract following a successful trial. He made his debut for Welling in the opening game of the season on 8 August 2015, playing the full match in a 1–0 victory against Guiseley at Park View Road. Lokko scored his first competitive goal in Welling's 2–1 home win over Woking on 28 March 2016, his first-half header proving decisive in ending Welling's 23-game winless run. He was a regular in central defence throughout the season, making 42 appearances in all competitions and scoring once, in what proved to be his breakthrough season of regular first-team football. Lokko left the club upon the expiry of his contract in May 2016.

=== Maidstone United ===
Lokko subsequently signed for National League club Maidstone United on a free transfer on 3 June 2016. He had rejected several offers from other National League teams prior to joining Maidstone, stating he had "done his research" and was impressed by the club's three promotions in four years under manager Jay Saunders. Lokko made his Maidstone debut in a 1–1 home draw with York City on the opening day of the 2016–17 season. He scored his first goal for the club later that month, an injury-time winning goal in a 1–0 away victory at Boreham Wood on 29 August 2016. Lokko scored twice in Maidstone's 4–2 win against Chester at the Gallagher Stadium on 18 February 2017. He played regularly during his one season at Maidstone, making 46 appearances and scoring four goals in all competitions.

=== Stevenage ===
Four days before the start of the 2017–18 season, on 2 August 2017, Lokko signed for League Two club Stevenage for an undisclosed fee on a two-year contract. The transfer occurred when Stevenage triggered a buyout clause in his contract, with several other clubs also showing interest in the defender. Just two days after signing, Lokko was loaned to Dagenham & Redbridge of the National League on a season-long loan agreement to continue gaining first-team experience. He made his Dagenham debut in the club's 2–1 home victory against Barrow on 5 August 2017, earning Man of the Match honours for his performance. Lokko then scored in consecutive games in home fixtures against Ebbsfleet United and Bromley at the end of August. He was a regular in the centre of defence during his time at Dagenham, making 28 appearances and scoring twice in all competitions.

Lokko was recalled by Stevenage at the start of February 2018, with chairman Phil Wallace noting that several transfer deadline day deals had enabled the club to recall him and ensure he was "integrated in the squad on a daily basis ready for next season". He made his debut for the club as an 85th-minute substitute in the club's 3–1 away defeat at Forest Green Rovers on 13 February 2018. A week after making his Stevenage debut, Lokko was loaned to National League club Dover Athletic for the remainder of the 2017–18 season, with Stevenage retaining an option to recall him after 28 days if necessary. He made his debut for Dover in a 3–1 away defeat to AFC Fylde on 24 February 2018, coming on as a 77th-minute substitute. He went on to make 12 appearances during the loan agreement, scoring once, before returning to Stevenage at the season's end, where he was subsequently made available for transfer.

=== Dover Athletic ===
Lokko signed for Dover Athletic on a permanent basis on 27 June 2018, joining the club for an undisclosed fee. He made his second debut at Dover in the opening match of the 2018–19 season, playing the full 90 minutes in a 1–0 defeat to Wrexham on 4 August 2018. Lokko was named National League Player of the Month for January 2019, having scored once and contributed to three clean sheets during the month. He made 42 appearances and scored six goals across the season, as Dover ended the campaign with a nine-match unbeaten run to finish 14th place in the National League. Lokko was appointed Dover's club captain on 27 June 2019. He made 29 appearances and scored four goals during Dover's 2019–20 season, which was curtailed in March 2020 due to the COVID-19 pandemic.

=== Harrogate Town and Aldershot Town ===
Lokko returned to the Football League by signing for League Two club Harrogate Town on a two-year contract on 14 August 2020. Harrogate's assistant manager, Paul Thirlwell, stated the club had been monitoring Lokko's availability after being impressed by his performances against Dover the previous season. He scored on his Harrogate debut in the club's 2–2 draw with Grimsby Town in the EFL Trophy on 8 September 2020. Lokko played a peripheral role during the 2020–21 season, making eight appearances and scoring two goals in all competitions. With one year remaining on his contract, Lokko was informed at the end of the season that he was free to look for another club.

Ahead of the 2021–22 season, Lokko signed a two-year contract with National League club Aldershot Town on 16 July 2021 and was appointed vice-captain. He made five appearances in the opening month of the season before sustaining an injury during the warm-up ahead of a 2–1 home defeat to Solihull Moors on 11 September 2021. After a six-month absence, he briefly returned to the first team in March 2022, making a total of eight appearances over the course of the season. Lokko left the club by mutual consent in May 2022.

=== Farnborough and Maidenhead United ===
Following his departure from Aldershot, Lokko agreed to join National League South club Farnborough in May 2022. He stated he felt he had "a lot to prove" after an injury-hit season at Aldershot and a step down in division. Lokko was appointed joint-captain and made 53 appearances in all competitions, scoring three goals. Farnborough finished the season in 12th, recording the fifth-best defensive record in the league with 17 clean sheets. He was subsequently named in the National League South Team of the Season.

Lokko signed for National League club Maidenhead United on 22 May 2023. Over two seasons with the club, he made 59 appearances and scored eight goals. Maidenhead were relegated to National League South on the final day of the 2024–25 season, after which Lokko announced he would be leaving upon the expiry of his contract in May 2025.

=== Folkestone Invicta ===
Having received more lucrative offers at National League South level, Lokko signed for Isthmian League Premier Division club Folkestone Invicta on 12 May 2025. He stated that the move suited his personal circumstances as it allowed him to play football on a part-time basis, and also cited the opportunity to reunite with manager Jay Saunders, whom he had previously played under at Maidstone, as a factor in his decision. Appointed captain ahead of the 2025–26 season, Lokko made 48 appearances and scored four goals. His winning goal in a 2–1 victory over St Albans City on 4 April 2026 secured Folkestone the Isthmian League Premier Division title. He was subsequently named the club's Supporters' Player of the Year, Players' Player of the Year and Manager's Player of the Year.

Lokko scored his first career hat-trick in a 5–1 home victory over Walton & Hersham in Folkestone's opening match of the 2026–27 season.

== International career ==
Lokko was called up to the England C team, who represent England at non-League level, for two fixtures in May 2017. He made his England C debut on 28 May 2017, playing the full match in a 2–1 win over Panjab FA at Damson Park. He also played the entire game two days later in a 1–1 draw against Jersey FA.

== Style of play ==
Lokko has primarily been deployed as a centre-back throughout his career. He is left-footed and typically plays as a left-sided central defender. Harrogate Town assistant manager Paul Thirlwell described him as a ball-playing defender with "a great range of passing" and praised his attacking threat from set-pieces.

== Career statistics ==
As of match played 22 August 2026

Appearances and goals by club, season and competition
Club	Season	League			FA Cup		League Cup		Other		Total	
Club	Season	Division	Apps	Goals	Apps	Goals	Apps	Goals	Apps	Goals	Apps	Goals
Colchester United	2014–15	League One	0	0	0	0	0	0	0	0	0	0
Welling United	2015–16	National League	38	1	3	0	—		1 (Note: Appearance(s) in FA Trophy)	0	42	1
Maidstone United	2016–17	National League	41	4	3	0	—		2	0	46	4
Stevenage	2017–18	League Two	2	0	0	0	0	0	0	0	2	0
Dagenham & Redbridge (loan)	2017–18	National League	25	2	2	0	—		1	0	28	2
Dover Athletic (loan)	2017–18	National League	12	1	0	0	—		0	0	12	1
Dover Athletic	2018–19	National League	39	6	2	0	—		1	0	42	6
Dover Athletic	2019–20	National League	27	3	1	0	—		1	1	29	4
Dover Athletic	Total		78	10	3	0	0	0	2	1	83	11
Harrogate Town	2020–21	League Two	3	1	2	0	0	0	3 (Note: Appearances in EFL Trophy)	1	8	2
Aldershot Town	2021–22	National League	8	0	0	0	—		0	0	8	0
Farnborough	2022–23	National League South	45	2	6	1	—		2	0	53	3
Maidenhead United	2023–24	National League	28	4	0	0	—		0	0	28	4
Maidenhead United	2024–25	National League	27	4	3	0	—		1 (Note: Appearance in National League Cup)	0	31	4
Maidenhead United	Total		55	8	3	0	0	0	1	0	59	8
Folkestone Invicta	2025–26	Isthmian League Premier Division	42	4	4	0	—		2	0	48	4
Folkestone Invicta	2026–27	National League South	3	3	0	0	—		0	0	3	3
Folkestone Invicta	Total		45	7	4	0	0	0	2	0	51	7
Career total			340	35	26	1	0	0	14	2	380	38

== Honours ==
Harrogate Town

- FA Trophy: 2019–20

Folkestone Invicta

- Isthmian League Premier Division: 2025–26

Individual

- National League South Team of the Year: 2022–23
- Folkestone Invicta Player of the Year: 2025–26
