= Jake Lawlor (English footballer) =

English footballer (born 1991)

Personal information
- Full name: Jacob Christopher Lawlor
- Date of birth: 8 April 1991 (age 35)
- Place of birth: Halifax, England
- Height: 6 ft 4 in (1.93 m)
- Position: Defender

Team information
- Current team: Guiseley

Youth career
- Manchester United

Senior career*
Years	Team	Apps	(Gls)
- Liversedge
–2012	Ossett Town		
2012–2013	Harrogate Railway Athletic		
2013–2018	Guiseley	186	(15)
2018	→ AFC Fylde (loan)	6	(0)
2018	Salford City	0	(0)
2018–2020	Wrexham	65	(1)
2020–2021	Harrogate Town	17	(0)
2021–2022	Hartlepool United	1	(0)
2021	→ Bromley (loan)	0	(0)
2021–2022	→ Darlington (loan)	8	(0)
2022–2024	Darlington (Note: For the visit to AFC Telford United on 1 November 2022, Soccerway lists the originally declared lineup, which included Lawlor; however, he was injured in the warm-up and replaced in the starting eleven by Kaine Felix, so should have one league appearance fewer than listed by Soccerway.)	89	(6)
2024–2026	Guiseley	68	(4)
- * Club domestic league appearances and goals as of 21:09, 8 June 2026 (UTC)

Jacob Christopher Lawlor (born 8 April 1991) is an English professional footballer who plays as a defender. Lawlor most recently played for Northern Premier League Premier Division club Guiseley.

Lawlor played youth football for Manchester United, but was released at the age of 14, and subsequently played non-league football for Liversedge, Ossett Town and Harrogate Railway Athletic before joining Guiseley in 2013. He had a loan spell at AFC Fylde in 2018, before being released by Guiseley later that year and subsequently joining Salford City in July 2018. However, he joined Wrexham just two months later, having not made an appearance for Salford City. He was released by Wrexham in summer 2020 and joined newly promoted League Two side Harrogate Town. After only one season at Harrogate, Lawlor joined League Two club Hartlepool United, from where he had spells on loan at Bromley and Darlington before spending the next two and a half years with the latter club.

== Career ==
=== Early career ===
Lawlor was born in Halifax and grew up in Brighouse. He played youth football with Manchester United but was released at the age of 14. He played non-league football for Liversedge, joining the club at the age of 17, but left less than a year later to study at Sheffield Hallam University. He joined Ossett Town at the age of 18. After a few years at Ossett Town, he joined Harrogate Railway Athletic in summer 2012.

=== Guiseley ===
In February 2013, Lawlor signed for Guiseley of the Conference North. He made his debut for the club against Boston United on 9 February 2013. In summer 2013, he extended his contract with the club for the 2013–14 season. On 23 March 2018, he joined AFC Fylde on loan until the end of the season. He was released by Guiseley at the end of the season.

=== Salford City and Wrexham ===
He joined National League club Salford City in July 2018, before moving to fellow National League side Wrexham on a two-year deal for an undisclosed fee in September 2018. He was released by Wrexham at the beginning of July 2020.

=== Harrogate Town ===
Lawlor signed for EFL League Two club Harrogate Town in August 2020. He made 17 league appearances across the 2020–21 season, but was released at the end of the season.

=== Hartlepool United ===
Lawlor signed for Hartlepool United on 1 August 2021 following a successful trial period, with the length of his contract not disclosed by the club. Lawlor made his Hartlepool debut as a late substitute in a 3–2 defeat to Barrow. Lawlor joined National League club Bromley on a month-long loan on 22 September 2021, but remained an unused substitute through his loan spell.

=== Darlington ===
On 12 November 2021, Lawlor joined National League North club Darlington on loan for two months. He was a regular member of the starting eleven, and Darlington's manager, Alun Armstrong, had expected the loan to be extended to the end of the season, but this did not happen. On 19 January 2022, a week after the loan expired, Lawlor's contract with Hartlepool was terminated by mutual consent. The following day, he signed for Darlington for the rest of the season, and remained with the club for the 2022–23 campaign.

After the dismissal of manager Alun Armstrong and assistant Darren Holloway on 6 September 2023, Lawlor was one of a group of three senior players tasked with covering managerial duties until an appointment was made. He was offered a new contract at the end of the season, but chose not to accept. Over nearly three years with the club, he scored six goals from 102 appearances in all competitions.

=== Return to Guiseley ===
On 1 July 2024, Lawlor returned to Northern Premier League Premier Division side Guiseley.

== Career statistics ==
As of end of the 2025-26 season

Appearances and goals by club, season and competition
Club	Season	League			FA Cup		League Cup		Other		Total	
Club	Season	Division	Apps	Goals	Apps	Goals	Apps	Goals	Apps	Goals	Apps	Goals
Guiseley	2012–13	Conference North	10	1	—		—		0	0	10	1
Guiseley	2013–14	Conference North	34	5	1	1	—		6 (Note: Three appearances in FA Trophy, three in Conference North play-offs)	0	41	6
Guiseley	2014–15	Conference North	41	3	3	0	—		6 (Note: Three appearances and one goal in FA Trophy, three appearances and one goal in Conference North play-offs)	2	50	5
Guiseley	2015–16	National League	46	1	2	0	—		5 (Note: Appearance(s) in FA Trophy)	0	53	1
Guiseley	2016–17	National League	34	3	2	0	—		2	0	38	3
Guiseley	2017–18	National League	21	2	4	0	—		1	0	26	2
Guiseley	Total		186	15	12	1	0	0	20	2	218	18
AFC Fylde (loan)	2017–18	National League	6	0	—		—		1 (Note: Appearance in National League play-offs)	0	7	0
Wrexham	2018–19	National League	34	0	4	0	—		2	0	40	0
Wrexham	2019–20	National League	31	1	4	0	—		1 (Note: Appearance in Scottish Challenge Cup)	0	36	1
Wrexham	Total		65	1	8	0	0	0	3	0	76	1
Harrogate Town	2020–21	League Two	17	0	2	1	0	0	2 (Note: Appearance(s) in EFL Trophy)	0	21	1
Hartlepool United	2021–22	League Two	1	0	0	0	0	0	1	0	2	0
Bromley (loan)	2021–22	National League	0	0	0	0	—		—		0	0
Darlington	2021–22 (Note: Lawlor made eight league appearances and one in the FA Trophy in the 2021–22 season while on loan from Hartlepool United before signing a permanent contract with Darlington.)	National League North	27	2	0	0	—		1	0	28	2
Darlington	2022–23	National League North	39	3	2	0	—		1	0	42	3
Darlington	2023–24	National League North	31	1	1	0	—		0	0	32	1
Darlington	Total		97	6	3	0	—		2	0	102	6
Guiseley	2024–25	Northern Premier League; Premier Division	36	2	4	1	—		3	0	43	3
Guiseley	2025–26	Northern Premier League; Premier Division	32	2	2	0	—		2	0	36	2
Guiseley	Total		68	4	6	1	—		5	0	79	5
Career total			440	26	31	3	0	0	34	0	505	30
