= Lloyd Kerry =

English footballer (born 1988)

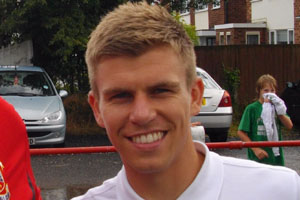
- Kerry in 2012

Personal information
- Full name: Lloyd Kerry
- Date of birth: 22 July 1988 (age 38)
- Place of birth: Chesterfield, England
- Height: 5 ft 7 in (1.70 m)
- Position: Midfielder

Youth career
- –2006: Sheffield United

Senior career*
| Years | Team | Apps | (Gls) |
| 2006–2008 | Sheffield United | 0 | (0) |
| 2007 | → Torquay United (loan) | 7 | (1) |
| 2008 | → Chesterfield (loan) | 13 | (2) |
| 2008–2010 | Chesterfield | 33 | (3) |
| 2009 | → Alfreton Town (loan) | | |
| 2010 | → Kidderminster Harriers (loan) | 9 | (0) |
| 2010–2012 | Hinckley United | 79 | (13) |
| 2012–2014 | Tamworth | 63 | (3) |
| 2014–2022 | Harrogate Town | 160 | (14) |
| 2015 | → Hednesford Town (loan) | 11 | (1) |
- * Club domestic league appearances and goals as of 21:59, 28 March 2021 (UTC)

Lloyd Kerry (born 22 July 1988) is an English former professional footballer who played as a midfielder.

== Career ==
=== Sheffield United ===
Born in Chesterfield, Derbyshire, Kerry began his career as a trainee with Sheffield United. He turned professional in August 2006, but did not make a first team appearance for the Blades.

He joined Torquay United on loan in February 2007, making his league debut in the 1–0 defeat at home to Hartlepool United on 17 February 2007. Kerry played seven times for Torquay, but returned to Sheffield United in April 2007 after a foot injury had ruled him out of the rest of the season.

Kerry's next move was to his hometown club Chesterfield, with whom he signed a one-month loan deal in mid February 2008 which later became a full season loan. He made his Spireites debut as a substitute the following day in a 2–0 defeat away to Hereford United. Despite a promising spell at Chesterfield where he played thirteen games and scored twice, Sheffield United chose to release him at the end of that season.

=== Chesterfield ===
After being released by the Blades he returned to Saltergate and signed a two-year deal with Chesterfield. In November 2009, he joined Alfreton Town on an initial one-month loan deal. The following March, Kerry joined Kidderminster Harriers on loan with Luke Prosser for the remainder of the season. At the end of that season, Kerry was released by John Sheridan along with 11 other players.

=== Hinckley United ===
After the end of his 2-year deal Kerry was released by Chesterfield, and signed for Hinckley United.

=== Tamworth ===
On 19 July 2012 Kerry signed a one-year deal with Conference Premier side Tamworth along with Peter Till and James Wren.

=== Harrogate Town ===
Having joined Harrogate Town on a two-year deal ahead of the 2014–15 season, Kerry found himself unable to hold down a permanent position in the side and was loaned out to Hednesford Town in January 2015. During the 2017–18 season, Kerry was a part of the side that won promotion to the National League for the first time, coming on as a half-time substitute in a 3–0 victory over Brackley Town. Following this promotion, Kerry was awarded with a new contract in October 2018.

Kerry remained with the club as they continued to make history. In August 2020, Kerry played the duration of the National League Play-Off Final as Harrogate defeated Notts County 3–1 at Wembley Stadium to secure promotion to the Football League for the first time in the club's history. The club returned to Wembley in May 2021 to take part in the 2020 FA Trophy Final which had been delayed due to the COVID-19 pandemic, a goal from Josh Falkingham enough to defeat Concord Rangers and lift the FA Trophy.

Kerry appeared on the opening day of the 2020–21 season as Harrogate's historic first ever match in the Football League saw them thrash Southend United 4–0 with Kerry himself grabbing the second goal.

In September 2021, Kerry came off of the bench in a 2–0 defeat to Port Vale to make his 200th appearance for the club. In April 2022, Kerry revealed that he would retire at the end of the 2021–22 season, staying on with the club and becoming Head of Recruitment.

== Career statistics ==
As of match played 09 March 2021

Appearances and goals by club, season and competition
| Club | Season | League | | | FA Cup | | League Cup | | Other | | Total | |
| Club | Season | Division | Apps | Goals | Apps | Goals | Apps | Goals | Apps | Goals | Apps | Goals |
|---|---|---|---|---|---|---|---|---|---|---|---|---|
| Torquay United (loan) | 2006–07 | League Two | 7 | 1 | 0 | 0 | 0 | 0 | 0 | 0 | 7 | 1 |
| Chesterfield (loan) | 2007–08 | League Two | 13 | 2 | 0 | 0 | 0 | 0 | 0 | 0 | 13 | 2 |
| Chesterfield | 2008–09 | League Two | 33 | 3 | 4 | 0 | 1 | 0 | 1 (Note: Appearances in the Football League Trophy) | 1 | 39 | 4 |
| Alfreton Town (loan) | 2009–10 | Conference North | | | | | — | | | | | |
| Kidderminster Harriers (loan) | 2009–10 | Conference Premier | 9 | 0 | 0 | 0 | — | | 0 | 0 | 9 | 0 |
| Hinckley United | 2010–11 | Conference North | 39 | 9 | 0 | 0 | — | | 1 (Note: Appearances in the FA Trophy) | 0 | 40 | 9 |
| Hinckley United | 2011–12 | Conference North | 40 | 4 | 4 | 1 | — | | 3 | 0 | 47 | 5 |
| Hinckley United | Hinckley United total | | 79 | 13 | 4 | 1 | 0 | 0 | 4 | 0 | 87 | 14 |
| Tamworth | 2012–13 | Conference Premier | 27 | 1 | 1 | 0 | — | | 4 | 0 | 32 | 1 |
| Tamworth | 2013–14 | Conference Premier | 36 | 2 | 1 | 0 | — | | 5 | 0 | 42 | 2 |
| Tamworth | Tamworth total | | 63 | 3 | 2 | 0 | 0 | 0 | 9 | 0 | 74 | 3 |
| Harrogate Town | 2014–15 | Conference North | 24 | 1 | 0 | 0 | — | | 0 | 0 | 24 | 1 |
| Harrogate Town | 2015–16 | National League North | 34 | 4 | 0 | 0 | — | | 0 | 0 | 34 | 4 |
| Harrogate Town | 2016–17 | National League North | 21 | 4 | 0 | 0 | — | | 0 | 0 | 21 | 4 |
| Harrogate Town | 2017–18 | National League North | 6 | 0 | 0 | 0 | — | | 2 | 0 | 8 | 0 |
| Harrogate Town | 2018–19 | National League | 34 | 1 | 1 | 0 | — | | 3 | 0 | 38 | 1 |
| Harrogate Town | 2019–20 | National League | 18 | 2 | 0 | 0 | — | | 5 | 2 | 23 | 4 |
| Harrogate Town | 2020–21 | League Two | 23 | 2 | 1 | 0 | 2 | 1 | 3 | 0 | 29 | 3 |
| Harrogate Town | Harrogate Town total | | 160 | 14 | 2 | 0 | 2 | 1 | 13 | 2 | 177 | 17 |
| Hednesford Town (loan) | 2014–15 | Conference North | 11 | 1 | 0 | 0 | — | | 0 | 0 | 11 | 1 |
| Career total | | | 375 | 37 | 12 | 1 | 3 | 1 | 27 | 3 | 417 | 42 |

== Honours ==
Harrogate Town

- National League play-offs: 2020
- FA Trophy: 2019–20
