= Brendan Kiernan =

English footballer (born 1992)

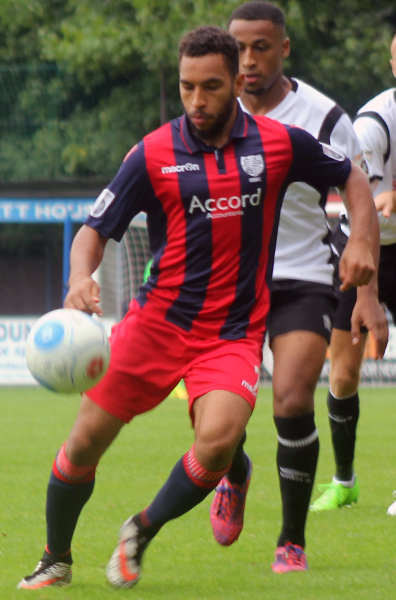
- Kiernan playing for Hampton & Richmond Borough in 2017

Personal information
- Full name: Brendan Jason Kiernan
- Date of birth: 10 November 1992 (age 33)
- Place of birth: Lambeth, England
- Height: 5 ft 9 in (1.75 m)
- Position: Winger

Team information
- Current team: Hampton & Richmond Borough

Youth career
- Bromley
- Fulham
- Crystal Palace
- 2009–2011: AFC Wimbledon

Senior career*
Years	Team	Apps	(Gls)
2011–2013	AFC Wimbledon	17	(0)
2012	→ Braintree Town (loan)	4	(0)
2013–2014	Bromley	39	(3)
2014	Staines Town	5	(1)
2014–2015	Ebbsfleet United	8	(0)
2015	Lingfield	7	(8)
2015	Hayes & Yeading United	6	(0)
2015–2016	Bromley	1	(0)
2016–2018	Hampton & Richmond Borough	103	(29)
2018–2019	Welling United	42	(13)
2019–2021	Harrogate Town	63	(11)
2021–2023	Walsall	37	(5)
2022–2023	→ Grimsby Town (loan)	20	(1)
2023	Hartlepool United	6	(0)
2024	Crystal Palace	0	(0)
2025	Maidenhead United	10	(5)
2025–	Hampton & Richmond Borough	22	(3)
- * Club domestic league appearances and goals as of 19:05, 22 May 2026 (UTC)

Brendan Jason Kiernan (born 10 November 1992) is an English professional footballer who plays as a midfielder for National League South club Hampton & Richmond Borough.

He spent his early youth career at Bromley, Fulham and Crystal Palace before joining AFC Wimbledon at the age of 16. He made his league debut for AFC Wimbledon as a substitute on 18 March 2011, at the age of 18. He joined Walsall on 1 July 2021. He spent the first half of the 2022–23 season on loan at Grimsby Town.

== Early life ==
Kiernan grew up near Arsenal's Highbury Stadium, and was an Arsenal fan.

== Personal life ==
Kiernan is a Christian.

Kiernan was married in June 2023.

== Club career ==
Kiernan started his career in the youth team at Fulham, but left as a youngster to join Crystal Palace. He stayed with the club until he was 16, but was released at the end of the season in 2009. He then underwent unsuccessful trials at QPR, Derby County, Charlton, Southend, Leeds and Leicester.

He then joined the AFC Wimbledon Senior Academy at South Thames College, where he got picked for the England Colleges team. The midfielder made his league debut for "The Dons" in a Conference game against Crawley Town in a 3–1 defeat on 18 March 2011, coming on as a substitute for Luke Moore. Kiernan only featured in one more game in the 2010–11 season, a 0–0 draw with Forest Green Rovers, which was his first League start for the club, securing a place in the Conference play-offs. Following AFC Wimbledon's promotion to the Football league Kiernan made his football league debut on 24 September 2011 when he came on as a substitute for Luke Moore in a 2–1 win over Bradford City in League Two. On 27 January 2012, Kiernan signed for Braintree Town on a one-month loan deal, making four appearances in total. Kiernan scored his first goal in professional football in the First Round of the League Cup against Stevenage on 14 August 2012. It would only prove to be a consolation, however, as AFC Wimbledon went on to be defeated 3–1. Having broken into the first team under manager Terry Brown at the start of the 2012 season, Kiernan left the club by mutual consent on 8 April 2013 under new manager Neal Ardley.

Following his departure from Wimbledon, Kiernan joined his local club Conference South side Bromley in July 2013. After impressing in pre-season, he scored on his debut, netting the first goal in a 2–0 away victory against Hayes and Yeading United on 17 August 2013. A week later, he scored Bromley's third goal in a 5–1 win over local rivals Tonbridge Angels. During his non-league career Kiernan worked as a teaching assistant and a personal trainer.

On 5 June 2015, Kiernan's contract with Ebbsfleet expired. He nearly retired from the game, but signed for Lingfield before spells with Hayes & Yeading United, Bromley and Hampton & Richmond Borough.

After a season at Welling United, after again reaching the play off final, it was announced in May 2019, that Kiernan had joined Harrogate Town.

Kiernan joined League Two side Walsall on a two-year contract on 1 July 2021. In November 2021 it was revealed that he was training to become a counsellor, and also acted as a mentor to young players released by clubs. On 21 July 2022, Kiernan signed for Grimsby Town on loan until January 2023. On 24 January 2023, Grimsby decided against extending the loan deal for Kiernan, he had played 28 times in all competitions for the Mariners. At Grimsby he was part of their historic run to the FA cup quarter final scoring two memorable goals against Plymouth on the way.

On 31 January 2023, Kiernan signed for League Two side Hartlepool United until the end of the season

During the 2023–24 season Kiernan played for Premier League club Crystal Palace. His role was to play for the under-21 team in a player/coach capacity.

In March 2025, Kiernan joined Maidenhead United on a deal until the end of the season. He scored five goals in ten games but left the club at the end of the campaign after relegation.

On 19 December 2025, Kiernan returned to Hampton & Richmond Borough, reuniting with former manager, Alan Dowson in the process.

== Career statistics ==
As of match played 25 April 2026

Appearances and goals by club, season and competition
Club	Season	League			FA Cup		League Cup		Other		Total	
Club	Season	Division	Apps	Goals	Apps	Goals	Apps	Goals	Apps	Goals	Apps	Goals
AFC Wimbledon	2010–11	Conference Premier	2	0	0	0	—		0	0	2	0
AFC Wimbledon	2011–12	League Two	9	0	1	0	0	0	0	0	10	0
AFC Wimbledon	2012–13	League Two	6	0	0	0	1	1	1 (Note: Appearance in the Football League Trophy)	0	8	1
AFC Wimbledon	Total		17	0	1	0	1	1	1	0	20	1
Braintree (loan)	2011–12	Conference Premier	4	0	—		—		0	0	4	0
Bromley	2013–14	Conference South	39	3	2	0	—		3 (Note: One appearance in the Kent Senior Cup, one in the FA Trophy and one in the Conference South play-offs)	0	44	3
Staines Town	2014–15	Conference South	5	1	0	0	—		0	0	5	1
Ebbsfleet United	2014–15	Conference South	8	0	0	0	—		6 (Note: Appearances in the FA Trophy)	1	14	1
Lingfield	2015–16	Southern Comb. D1	7	8	?	?	—		?	?	7	8
Hayes & Yeading	2015–16	National League South	6	0	1	0	—		0	0	7	0
Bromley	2015–16	National League	1	0	0	0	—		3 (Note: Two appearances in the Kent Senior Cup and one in the FA Trophy)	0	4	0
Hampton & Richmond Borough	2015–16	Isthmian Premier Division	23	11	?	?	—		?	?	23	11
Hampton & Richmond Borough	2016–17	National League South	40	15	0	0	—		0	0	40	15
Hampton & Richmond Borough	2017–18	National League South	40	3	1	0	—		2 (Note: Appearances in the FA Trophy)	0	43	3
Hampton & Richmond Borough	Total		103	29	1	0	0	0	2	0	106	29
Welling	2018–19	National League South	42	13	1	0	—		?	?	43	13
Harrogate Town	2019–20	National League	33	7	2	0	—		6 (Note: Appearances in the FA Trophy)	1	41	8
Harrogate Town	2020–21	League Two	30	4	2	0	0	0	3 (Note: Appearances in the Football League Trophy)	2	35	6
Harrogate Town	Total		63	11	4	0	0	0	9	3	76	14
Walsall	2021–22	League Two	37	5	1	1	1	0	2 (Note: Appearances in the EFL Trophy)	0	41	6
Grimsby Town (loan)	2022–23	League Two	20	1	3	2	2	0	3 (Note: Appearances in the EFL Trophy)	1	28	4
Hartlepool United	2022–23	League Two	6	0	0	0	0	0	0	0	6	0
Crystal Palace	2023–24	Premier League	0	0	0	0	0	0	—		0	0
Maidenhead United	2024–25	National League	10	5	—		—		—		10	5
Hampton & Richmond Borough	2025–26	National League South	22	3	—		—		—		22	3
Career total			390	79	14	3	4	1	29	5	437	88

== Honours ==
Hampton & Richmond

- Isthmian Premier Division: 2015–16

Harrogate Town

- National League play-offs: 2020
- FA Trophy: 2019–20
