= Aaron Martin (footballer, born 1991) =

English footballer

Personal information
- Full name: Aaron Lewiss Martin
- Date of birth: 5 July 1991 (age 35)
- Place of birth: Sheffield, England
- Height: 6 ft 0 in (1.83 m)
- Position: Forward

Team information
- Current team: South Shields

Youth career
- 1999–2003: Sheffield United
- 2003–2005: Barnsley
- 2005–2008: Sheffield United

Senior career*
| Years | Team | Apps | (Gls) |
| 2008–2009 | Staveley Miners Welfare | | |
| 2010–2011 | Worksop Parramore | | |
| 2011–2012 | Goole | | |
| 2012–2017 | Sheffield | | |
| 2017–2019 | Brighouse Town | | |
| 2019–2020 | Guiseley | 20 | (17) |
| 2020–2022 | Harrogate Town | 28 | (5) |
| 2022 | → FC Halifax Town (loan) | 0 | (0) |
| 2022–2023 | Gateshead | 25 | (3) |
| 2023–2024 | South Shields | 41 | (11) |
| 2024– | Worksop Town | 3 | (0) |
- * Club domestic league appearances and goals as of 20:57, 25 November 2024 (UTC)

Aaron Lewiss Martin (born 5 July 1991) is an English professional footballer who plays as a forward for Worksop Town.

== Career ==
Martin was born in Sheffield.

After playing youth football for Sheffield United and Barnsley, Martin played senior football for Staveley Miners Welfare, Worksop Parramore, Goole, Sheffield, Brighouse Town and Guiseley before signing for Harrogate Town in March 2020.

On 9 July 2022, Martin joined National League side Gateshead on a two-year deal following the clubs promotion the season before.

== Honours ==
Gateshead

- FA Trophy runner-up: 2022–23
