= George Thomson (footballer, born 1992) =

English footballer

Personal information
- Full name: George Henry Thomson
- Date of birth: 19 May 1992 (age 34)
- Place of birth: Melton Mowbray, England
- Height: 5 ft 9 in (1.75 m)
- Position: Midfielder

Team information
- Current team: Harrogate Town
- Number: 7

Youth career
- 2004–2010: Nottingham Forest
- 2010–2011: Glenn Hoddle Academy
- 2011: Jerez Industrial

Senior career*
Years	Team	Apps	(Gls)
2011–2012	Hinckley United	3	(0)
2012	→ Daventry Town (loan)	18	(1)
2012	Histon	5	(0)
2012–2014	King's Lynn Town	88	(24)
2014–2016	Chester	20	(2)
2015–2016	→ F.C. United of Manchester (loan)	7	(4)
2016–2017	F.C. United of Manchester	57	(23)
2017–	Harrogate Town	256	(56)
- * Club domestic league appearances and goals as of 19:23, 2 January 2024 (UTC)

George Henry Thomson (born 19 May 1992) is an English professional footballer who plays as a midfielder for National League side Harrogate Town.

== Career ==
Born in Melton Mowbray, Thomson started his career at Nottingham Forest as a 12 year old in 2004 and was in their academy for six years. After leaving Forest he had an 18-month spell at Glenn Hoddle's academy in Spain and Jerez Industrial, but made his competitive footballing debut for Conference North side Hinckley United against Gloucester City on 3 December 2011. He came on as a 78th-minute substitute for Danny Bragoli as the match ended in a 2–2 draw. The next season, Thomson moved to fellow Conference North side Histon, making his debut on 21 August 2012 against Boston United. He started in the 6–0 defeat for the club. After another season, Thomson moved to King's Lynn Town where he scored a hat-trick for the club in their FA Cup match against AFC Fylde.

In January 2015, Thomson signed with Conference National side Chester. He made his debut for the club on 24 January against Kidderminster Harriers. He came on as an 84th-minute substitute for Brad Abbott as Chester won 1–0. Thomson scored his first goal for the club on 10 March 2015 against Torquay United. His 29th-minute goal was the only one in a 1–0 victory. In November 2015, Thomson joined F.C. United of Manchester on a one-month loan, which was later extended to a two-month loan. He made his debut for the club on 21 November in a 2–2 draw against Nuneaton Borough. A few weeks later, on 19 December, Thomson scored his first goal for United in a 3–2 victory over Nuneaton Borough.

On 16 January 2016, it was announced that Thomson had been sold by Chester to F.C. United on a permanent basis for an undisclosed fee. He spent a season and a half with Manchester before moving to Harrogate Town. He made his debut for Harrogate Town on 5 August 2017 against Nuneaton Borough. He started and scored the first goal for Harrogate in a 4–0 victory. Thomson would go on to finish his first season with the club by helping his side earn promotion to the National League and scoring 11 goals. Two seasons later, on 2 August 2020, Thomson helped Harrogate earn promotion again to League Two. He scored the first goal in a 3–1 victory in the National League playoff final against Notts County. Later that month, he extended his contract with the club. In June 2026, he extended his contract with the club a further year, which would be his 10th season at the club.

== Career statistics ==
As of match played 8 May 2021

Appearances and goals by club, season and competition
Club	Season	League			FA Cup		League Cup		Other		Total	
Club	Season	Division	Apps	Goals	Apps	Goals	Apps	Goals	Apps	Goals	Apps	Goals
Hinckley United	2011–12	Conference North	3	0	0	0	—		0	0	3	0
Daventry Town (loan)	2011–12	Southern Football League Division One Central	18	1	?	?	—		?	?	18+	1+
Histon	2012–13	Conference North	5	0	0	0	—		0	0	5	0
King's Lynn Town	2012–13	Northern Premier League Division One South	23	2	0	0	—		7 (Note: Three of these appearances are in the FA Trophy)	3	30	5
King's Lynn Town	2013–14	Northern Premier League	39	9	0	0	—		6	2	45	11
King's Lynn Town	2014–15	Northern Premier League	26	13	1	3	—		7	5	34	21
Chester	2014–15	Conference National	8	2	0	0	—		0	0	8	2
Chester	2015–16	National League	12	0	0	0	—		1	1	13	1
F.C. United of Manchester (loan)	2015–16	National League North	7	4	0	0	—		0	0	7	4
F.C. United of Manchester	2015–16	National League North	19	7	0	0	—		0	0	19	7
F.C. United of Manchester	2016–17	National League North	38	16	0	0	—		0	0	38	16
Harrogate Town	2017–18	National League North	42	11	1	0	—		4 (Note: Appearance(s) in FA Trophy)	1	47	12
Harrogate Town	2018–19	National League	45	8	1	0	—		3	1	49	9
Harrogate Town	2019–20	National League	24	7	2	0	—		6	0	32	7
Harrogate Town	2020–21	League Two	46	3	2	0	2	0	2 (Note: Appearance(s) in EFL Trophy)	0	52	3
Career total			355	83	7	3	2	0	36	13	399+	98+

== Honours ==
King's Lynn Town

- Northern Premier League Division One South: 2012–13

Harrogate Town

- National League North play-offs: 2018
- National League play-offs: 2020
- FA Trophy: 2019–20
