= Simon Weaver =

English footballer and manager (born 1977)

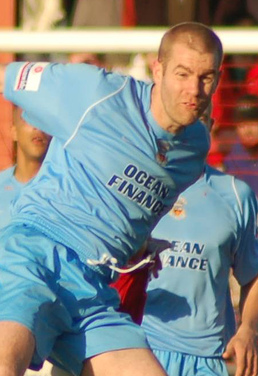
- Weaver playing for Tamworth in 2007

Personal information
- Full name: Simon Daniel Weaver
- Date of birth: 20 December 1977 (age 48)
- Place of birth: Doncaster, England
- Height: 6 ft 1 in (1.85 m)
- Position: Defender

Team information
- Current team: Harrogate Town (manager)

Senior career*
Years	Team	Apps	(Gls)
1996–1998	Sheffield Wednesday	0	(0)
1997	→ Doncaster Rovers (loan)	2	(0)
1998–2000	Ilkeston Town		
2000–2002	Nuneaton Borough	63	(0)
2002–2004	Lincoln City	88	(4)
2004	→ Macclesfield Town (loan)	7	(0)
2004–2005	Kidderminster Harriers	23	(0)
2005–2006	Scarborough	22	(1)
2006	York City	0	(0)
2006–2007	Tamworth	38	(1)
2007–2008	Boston United		
2008–2009	King's Lynn		
2008–2009	Redditch United		
2008–2009	Ilkeston Town		
2009–2012	Harrogate Town		
Total		243	(6)

Managerial career
- 2009–: Harrogate Town
- * Club domestic league appearances and goals

Simon Daniel Weaver (born 20 December 1977) is an English football manager and former player who is manager of National League side Harrogate Town.

As a player he was a defender from 1996 until 2012 and notably played in the Football League for Lincoln City between 2002 and 2004; he also briefly played in the league for Doncaster Rovers, Macclesfield Town and Kidderminster Harriers. He also played at non-league level for Ilkeston Town, Nuneaton Borough, Scarborough, York City, Tamworth, Boston United, King's Lynn and Redditch United. In May 2009, he was appointed player/manager of Harrogate Town and led the team to first-ever promotions to the National League in 2018 and League Two in 2020, but were relegated from League Two in 2026.

== Playing career ==
Born in Doncaster, South Yorkshire, Weaver played as a central defender and began his career as an apprentice with Sheffield Wednesday and made his professional debut during a loan spell with Doncaster Rovers in February 1997. Released by Wednesday, he moved into the non-league circuit with first Ilkeston Town and then Nuneaton Borough.

In the summer of 2002, he made a return to the Football League, signing for Lincoln City, who were managed by Keith Alexander, his former boss at Ilkeston. He signed a new one-year contract in July 2004, but lost his place in the Lincoln team at the start of the 2004–05 season, and was transfer listed at his request. Following a loan period at Macclesfield Town, he joined Kidderminster Harriers, and was one of ten players released at the end of the season after Kidderminster were relegated to the Conference National. He signed a 12-month contract with Scarborough in June 2005, but despite initial optimism, the spell was not successful and with Scarborough in disarray, Weaver was in need of a new club for the 2006–07 season.

Weaver signed a short-term contract with Conference National side York City at the beginning of the 2006–07 season but having been an unused substitute for the first two games of the season, he was released by York so that he could take up the offer of a 12-month contract at Tamworth. Although Weaver played in many of Tamworths games in the 2006–07 season, he was not offered a new contract following the club's relegation.

In the summer of 2007, he briefly trialled with Conference Premier newcomers Salisbury City and had discussions with Droylsden. He was injured playing in a pre-season friendly in Scotland: an injury that required the bones in his foot to be pinned. The injury caused him to miss the first four months of the season but, returning to fitness, he signed for Boston United on 11 December 2007.

On 29 May 2008, Weaver joined Conference North newcomers King's Lynn, after failing to agree a new deal with Boston. He scored three goals in 22 appearances but left King's Lynn in January after failing to get a regular start in recent weeks. He joined Redditch United, debuting in their 2–1 victory at Hyde United on 31 January 2009. After one further appearance for the club in the away defeat to Fleetwood Town a fortnight later, Weaver rejoined his former club Ilkeston Town. He made a successful debut for the club, netting twice in a 4–3 Northern Premier League Challenge Cup victory at Boston United on 18 February 2009.

== Managerial career ==
Weaver was appointed as the new player-manager of Harrogate Town of the Conference North on 20 May 2009. His father Irving became chairman in 2011, and "the Weavers have transformed Harrogate from sixth-tier strugglers to National League high-flyers challenging for an English Football League place". In May 2018, the team won 3–0 in the play-off final against Brackley Town to reach the National League for the first time in their history.

On 2 August 2020, Weaver led Harrogate to the English Football League for the first time as they beat Notts County 3–1 in the National League play-off final at Wembley Stadium. On 12 September, they won 4–0 at Southend United in the club's first-ever Football League match.

On 2 May 2026, following a 1-2 defeat to Barnet, Harrogate Town were relegated from League Two to the National League after 6 seasons in the EFL.

== Managerial statistics ==
As of match played 21 November 2026

Managerial record by team and tenure
Team	From	To	Record				
Team	From	To	P	W	D	L	Win %
Harrogate Town	20 May 2009	Present	858	330	197	331	38.5
Total			858	330	197	331	38.5

== Honours ==
Harrogate Town

- National League play-offs: 2020
- National League North play-offs: 2018
- FA Trophy: 2019–20

Individual

- EFL League Two Manager of the Month: January 2024
