= Harrogate Town A.F.C. =

Association football club in Harrogate, England

Coordinates: 53°59′30″N 1°30′52″W

Harrogate Town
- Full name: Harrogate Town Association Football Club
- Nickname: Sulphurites
- Founded: 1914; 112 years ago
- Ground: Wetherby Road
- Capacity: 5,000 (2,000 seated)
- Chairman: Simon Weaver & Jonathan Blezard
- Manager: Simon Weaver
- League: National League
- 2025–26: EFL League Two, 23rd of 24 (relegated)
- Website: harrogatetownafc.com
| Home colours | Away colours |

Harrogate Town Association Football Club is a professional association football club in Harrogate, North Yorkshire, England. The club's first team compete in the National League, the fifth level of the English football league system, as of the 2026–27 season.

Harrogate Hotspurs were founded in 1919 and changed their name to Harrogate Town after football returned at the end of the Second World War, joining the West Yorkshire Association League. They entered the Yorkshire League again in 1957. In 1982 the club became founder members of the Northern Counties East League and a founding member of the Northern Premier League's First Division in 1987. They won the Northern Premier League Division One title in 2001–02 and became founder members of the Conference North in 2004. They won the National League North play-offs in 2018 and secured a place in the Football League for the first time with victory in the 2020 National League play-off final. The team won the 2019–20 FA Trophy after defeating Concord Rangers. The club is nicknamed the Sulphurites, due to the spa town's sulphur springs. The club's colours are black and yellow and they play home games at Wetherby Road.

== History ==
=== Early history ===
People in the town of Harrogate had tried to put together a football team as far back as 1907 but it took until 1914 for Harrogate A.F.C. to be founded. They were entered into the Northern Football League in 1914, and were set to play their home fixtures at the County Ground, but the First World War meant all fixtures were postponed.

After the First World War, Robert Ackrill Breare instigated a meeting to discuss putting the club back together. Breare later became the secretary of the club, which entered into the West Riding League.

Harrogate played their first competitive fixture on 30 August 1919 at Starbeck Lane Ground against Horsforth. They won the game 1–0 and the scorer was L. Craven with a headed goal. They were entered into the FA Cup the same year, losing to South Kirkby Colliery 4–0 in a 1Q replay. Harrogate also won their first trophy, the Whitworth Cup, with a 4–0 victory against Ripon City.

For the 1920–21 season Harrogate were one of the founding teams in the new Yorkshire League, yet they also continued to field a team in the West Riding League. The club had relocated to a new ground: Wetherby Road. Around the holiday periods, they took part in friendlies against higher league opposition including Liverpool at their Anfield ground, and another at fellow Yorkshire side Sheffield United in front of 15,000 fans.

They moved league once again for their third season, leaving the West Riding League and moving into the Midland Football League. It included the reserve teams of Nottingham Forest, Sheffield Wednesday and Barnsley. The club remained in the Yorkshire League, fielding a reserve team. However, the club resigned from the Midland League after only one season and reverting to fielding a first team in the Yorkshire League. The West Riding County Challenge Cup was won by Harrogate in 1925, with their 3–1 victory against Fryston Colliery at Elland Road.

League victory was secured in 1926–27, as Harrogate became the Yorkshire League champions, with Bob Morphet scoring 44 goals. The club then moved into the Northern Football League. Their second West Riding County Challenge Cup was won the same season against Selby Town. The team disbanded in 1932.

=== Climbing the pyramid (1935–2011) ===
A football club was brought back to the town in 1935 with Harrogate Hotspurs. After the Second World War, the club was renamed Harrogate Town and played in the West Yorkshire Association Football League. Harrogate Town joined the Yorkshire League again in 1957. They spent many years in the Yorkshire League during the 1960s and 1970s, and then became a founding member of the new Northern Counties East Football League in 1982. On 4 September 1976, they fielded a black player for the first time when Denver Mitchell played in goal for them against Rawmarsh Welfare. Denver made 29 appearances for Harrogate between 1976 and 1978. The club was looking to climb the newly instated football pyramid and so began to improve their ground, installing floodlights. They played a friendly to mark the occasion against Leeds United, with Eddie Gray being the first to switch the lights on.

Chart of Harrogate's yearly table positions in the league since promotion to the Conference North

After a West Riding County Cup win in 1986, and five seasons in the Northern Counties East League, they became founding members of the Northern Premier League's new First Division in 1987–88, after having been invited to join the new league. In 1990 the club became a limited company to fund construction of a new main stand, and in the same year the club won the Northern Premier League First Division Cup. They spent 15 seasons in this league, twice narrowly avoiding relegation back to the Northern Counties East League. However, they won promotion to the Premier Division in 2001–02 after finishing as champions. During their first season in that division they finished sixth, and for the first time in the club's history they reached the first round of the FA Cup, losing 5–1 to Farnborough Town of the Football Conference. Town also won the West Riding County Cup in both the 2001–02 and 2002–03 seasons.

After finishing fifth in the Premier Division in 2003–04, the club became founders of the newly established Conference North in 2004. During their FA Cup run in the 2005–06 season, Harrogate were drawn to play at Torquay United, their first cup game against Football League opposition. After drawing 1–1 at Plainmoor, they lost 6–5 on penalties after a 0–0 draw in the replay. At the end of the season the club finished fifth and qualified for the promotion play-offs, but lost 1–0 to eventual winners Stafford Rangers.

At the end of the 2009–10 season the club finished bottom of the Conference North and were due to be relegated. However, after Northwich Victoria were demoted due to financial problems, the club were reprieved.

=== Irving Weaver era (2011–present) ===
Before the start of the 2011–12 season, Bill Fotherby handed control of the club to Irving Weaver, father of manager Simon Weaver. Tad Nowakowski, father of player Adam, also joined the board to help improve community links. The 2011–12 season ended in a relegation dogfight, Harrogate survived on the final day thanks to a 5–0 away win at Corby Town. The 2012–13 season saw the team's best run in the FA Cup. On 3 November 2012 they beat League Two team Torquay United 1–0 to go beyond the first round for the first time. Against Hastings United in the second round, they drew 1–1 at Wetherby Road, and the replay at Hastings also finished 1–1 but they lost 5–4 on penalties.

After a good start placing them in the top five at the beginning of the 2016–17 season, the team went on a long run of bad form. As a result, Weaver and other club officials decided that the players at the end of the season should be given full-time contracts to improve chances of promotion. The club began training full time from 3 July 2017. They won the National League North play-offs for the 2017–18 season beating Brackley Town in the play-off final earning promotion to the National League. The club finished sixth in their 2018–19 National League campaign, qualifying for the play-offs. They were beaten 3–1 by AFC Fylde in a play-off eliminator. As the 2019–20 National League season was curtailed due to the COVID-19 pandemic, table positions were determined on average points-per-game, of which Harrogate Town had 1.78, placing them second and meaning they again qualified for the play-offs, this time in the semi-finals. In the semi-final, they beat Boreham Wood 1–0. On 2 August 2020, at Wembley Stadium, the club faced Notts County in the play-off final and won 3–1, earning promotion to the English Football League for the first time in their history. They also reached the 2020 FA Trophy final, defeating Hartlepool United, Darlington, Eastleigh, AFC Fylde and Notts County on their route to the final. Harrogate won the final against Concord Rangers on 3 May 2021. As a result of the almost 12-month delay in staging the final, caused by the COVID-19 pandemic, Harrogate Town became the first EFL side in history to participate in the competition.

On 12 September 2020, Harrogate played their first English Football League game, winning 4–0 away at Southend United. In September 2020, Harrogate played their first EFL Cup match, away to Tranmere Rovers which they won. In the second round, Harrogate were eliminated by Premier League side West Bromwich Albion 3–0. In 2020–21, Harrogate finished their first Football League season in 17th place. In 2021–22, Harrogate did enough to survive in the League again, finishing in 19th place and reached the third round of the FA Cup for the first time. In the 2024–25 season, Harrogate reached the FA Cup third round again, losing 1–0 away to Leeds United.

On 2 May 2026, following a 1–2 defeat to Barnet, Harrogate were relegated from League Two after six seasons in the EFL.

== League history ==
| 1957–1961 Yorkshire League Division 2; 1961–1967 Yorkshire League Division 1; 1967–1970 Yorkshire League Division 2; 1970–1972 Yorkshire League Division 3; 1972–1978 Yorkshire League Division 2; 1978–1981 Yorkshire League Division 3; 1981–1982 Yorkshire League Division 2; 1982–1985 Northern Counties East League Division 1 North | 1985–1986 Northern Counties East League Division 1; 1986–1987 Northern Counties East League Premier Division; 1987–2002 Northern Premier League Division 1; 2002–2004 Northern Premier League Premier Division; 2004–2018 National League North; 2018–2020 National League; 2020–2026 EFL League Two; 2026– National League |

== Ground ==
The club play at Wetherby Road. Opened on 28 August 1920, it has a capacity of 5,000 of which 2,000 is seated. The ground is situated on the A661 Wetherby Road adjacent to Harrogate District Hospital. It has covered accommodation on all four sides, as well as a hospitality lounge in the south-east corner. The club shop and a function room called the 1919 Venue are on the south side. Harrogate Town's academy also play most of their home games at Wetherby Road.

On promotion to the Football League in August 2020, the club confirmed that, to comply with the League's regulations, they would replace Wetherby Road's synthetic pitch with a grass one. This was not completed by the time that the 2020–21 season commenced and the club arranged a temporary groundshare at Doncaster Rovers's Keepmoat Stadium. The first Football League match played at Wetherby Road was on 17 October 2020 when Harrogate beat Barrow 1–0.

=== Gallery ===
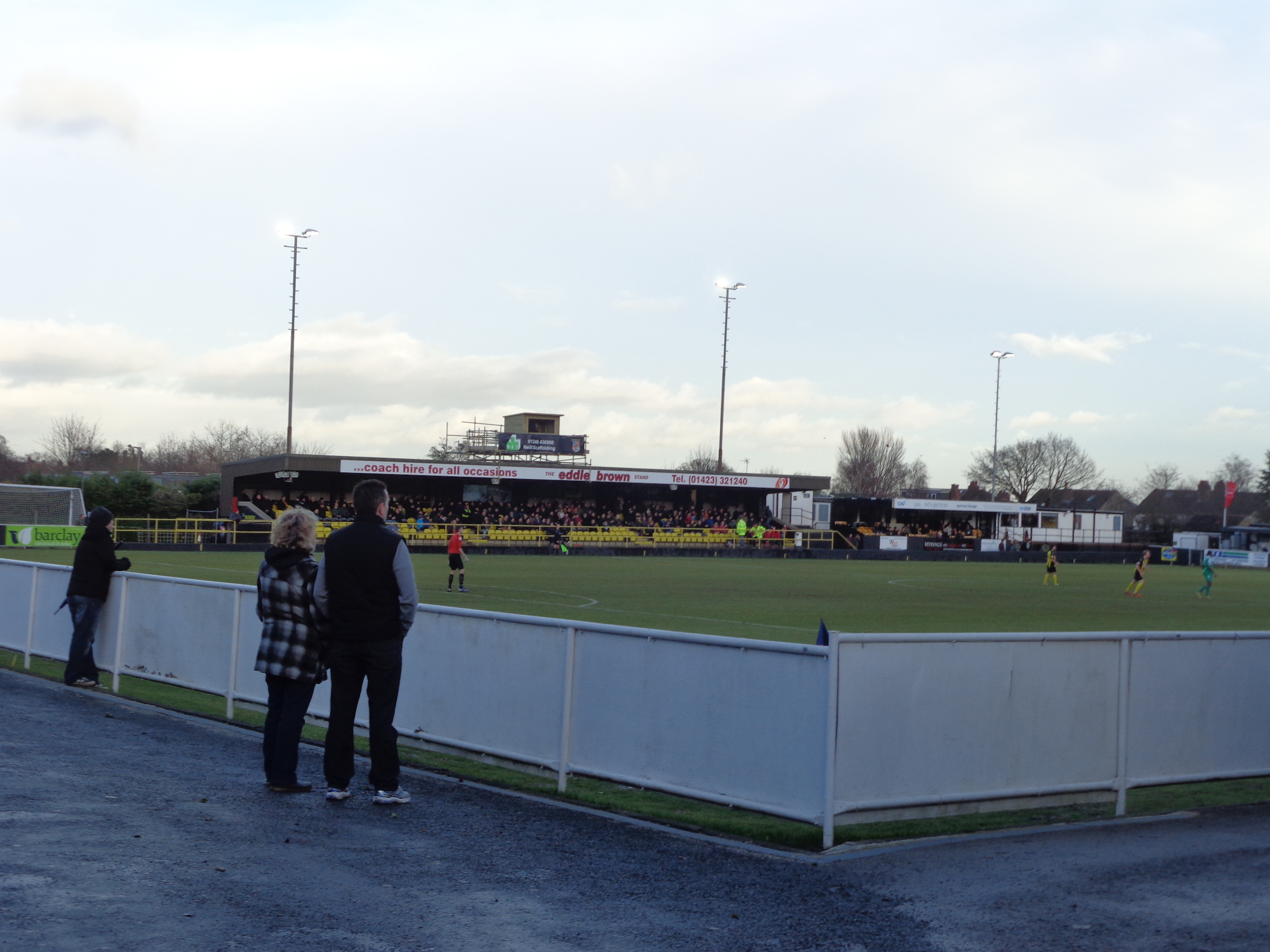
The ground in 2014 before remodelling

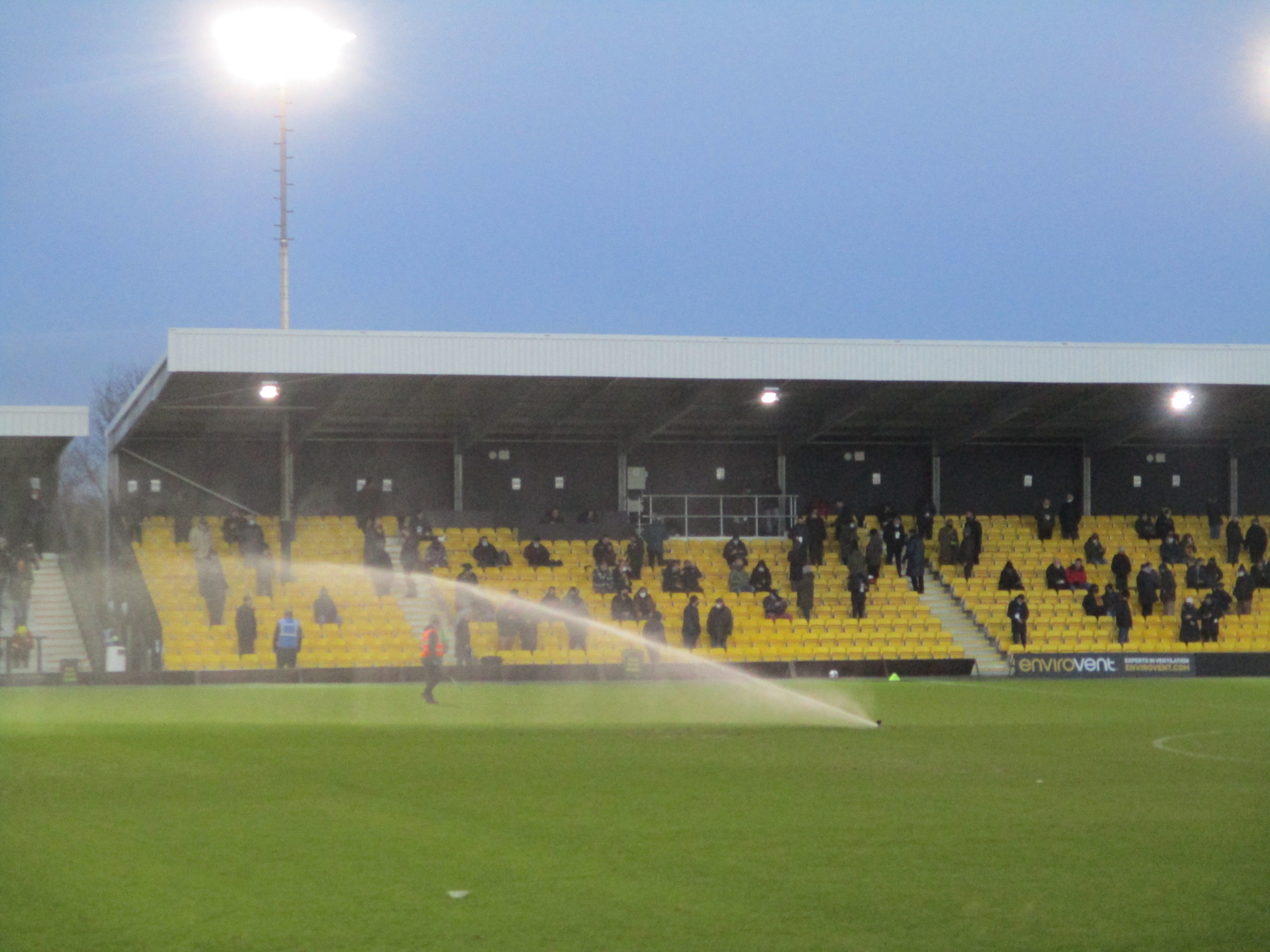
A socially distanced crowd in the East Stand in 2020

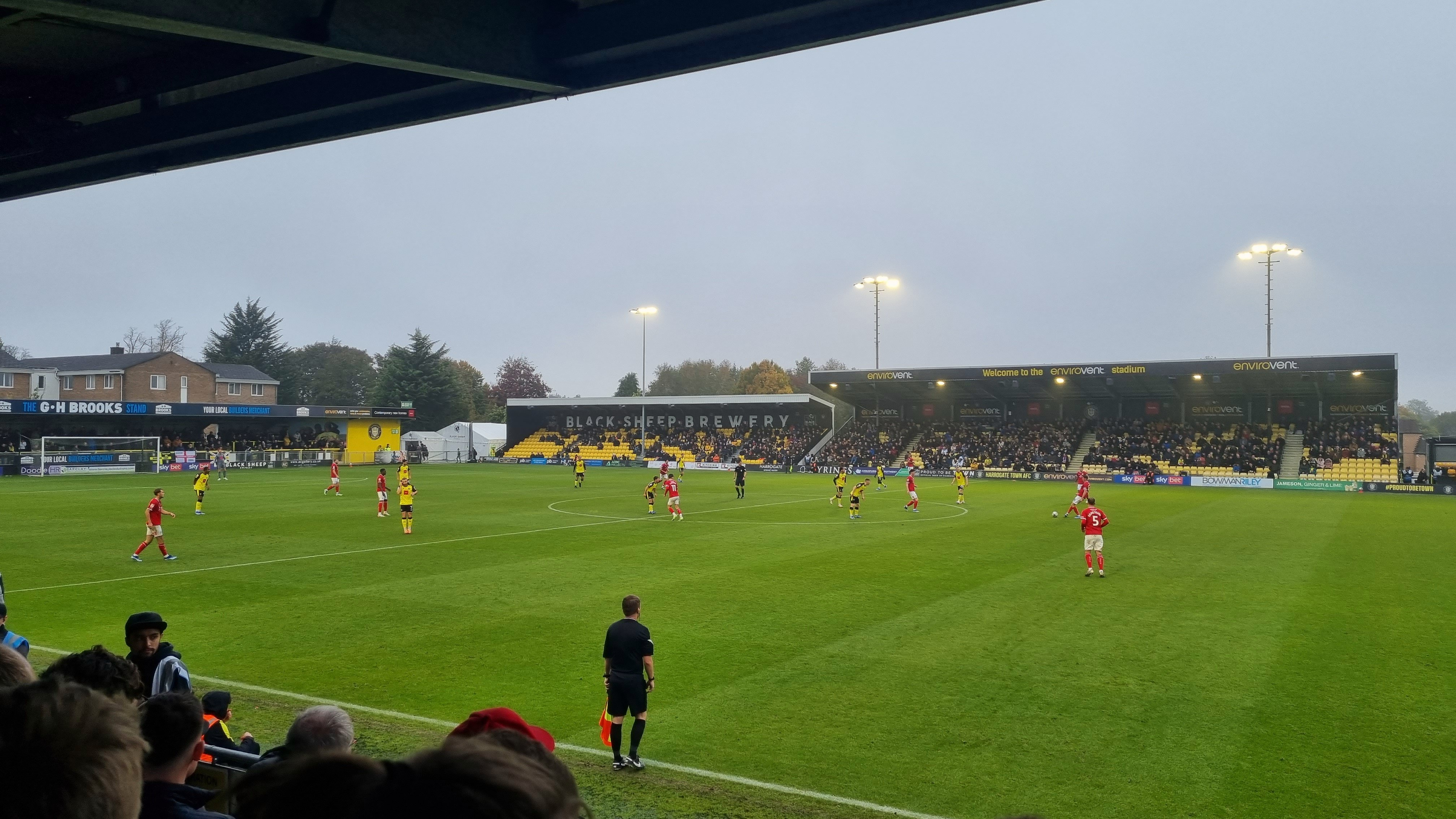
Northwards view showing Hospital End (left) and two stands on eastern side (October 2023)

== Current squad ==
As of 10 September 2026

Note: Flags indicate national team as defined under FIFA eligibility rules; some limited exceptions apply. Players may hold more than one non-FIFA nationality.

| No. | Pos. | Nation | Player |
|---|---|---|---|
| 1 | GK | ENG | Mark Oxley |
| 2 | DF | ENG | Lewis Payne |
| 3 | DF | SKN | Ethan Bristow |
| 4 | DF | ENG | Archie Baptiste |
| 5 | DF | ENG | Tom Bradbury |
| 6 | DF | ENG | Warren Burrell (captain) |
| 7 | MF | ENG | George Thomson |
| 8 | MF | ENG | Bryn Morris |
| 9 | FW | ENG | Shawn McCoulsky |
| 10 | MF | ENG | Mason Bennett |
| 11 | MF | ENG | Will McGowan |
| 12 | DF | ENG | Tom Lees |
| 14 | MF | WAL | Morgan Williams |

| No. | Pos. | Nation | Player |
|---|---|---|---|
| 15 | MF | ENG | Bailey Hobson |
| 17 | MF | ENG | Josh Hmami |
| 18 | FW | ENG | Jack Muldoon |
| 19 | DF | SCO | Michael Craig (on loan from Leyton Orient) |
| 20 | FW | ENG | Rohan Vaughan |
| 21 | MF | ENG | Ellis Taylor |
| 23 | FW | ENG | Brad Dolaghan |
| 24 | MF | ENG | Lewis Cass |
| 26 | DF | ENG | Grant Horton |
| 27 | MF | ENG | Ben Fox |
| 28 | DF | ENG | Marcus Etherington |
| 29 | MF | ENG | Lucas Barnes |
| 30 | GK | ENG | Rory Watson |
| 35 | FW | NIR | Ciaran McGuckin |

== Current staff ==
As of 29 June 2022

Board of directors

- Chairman: Irving Weaver
- Vice-chairman: Howard Matthews
- Managing director: Garry Plant
- Associate director: Richard Crabb
- Events director: Angus Taylor
- Operations director: Dave Riley
- Finance director: Julian Davis

Coaching staff

- Manager: Simon Weaver
- Assistant Manager: Paul Thirlwell
- Goalkeeping Coach: Phil Priestley
- Coach: Lee Barraclough
- Physio: Rachel Davis
- Sport psychology: Phil Lee
- Academy U21s manager: Josh Falkingham
- Academy U17s manager: Josh Walsh
- Academy secretary: Dave Riley
- Academy Physio: Laura Rhys-Williams
- Women's Manager: Kate Doonan

Other staff

- Club Secretary: Abbey Smith
- Life President: George Dunnington
- Vice-president 1: David Batty
- Vice-president 2: Clive Dunnington
- Club scout: Lloyd Kerry

== Records ==
- FA Cup best performance
  - Third round: 2021–22, 2024–25
- EFL Cup best performance
  - Second round: 2020–21, 2023–24
- EFL Trophy best performance
  - Quarter-finals: 2021–22
- FA Trophy best performance
  - Winner: 2019–20
- FA Vase best performance
  - Fourth round: 1989–90

== Honours ==
League

- National League (level 5)
  - Play-off winners: 2020
- National League North (level 6)
  - Play-off winners: 2018
- Northern Premier League
  - Division One champions: 2001–02
- Yorkshire League
  - Champions: 1926–27
  - Division Two champions: 1981–82

Cup

- FA Trophy
  - Winners: 2019–20
- Northern Premier League Division One Cup
  - Winners: 1989–90
- West Riding County Challenge Cup
  - Winners (8): 1925–26, 1926–27, 1962–63, 1972–73, 1985–86, 2001–02, 2002–03, 2007–08
- Whitworth Cup
  - Winners: 1919–20
