= 2021–22 Hartlepool United F.C. season =

Hartlepool United
2021–22 season
- Owner: Raj Singh
- Chairman: Raj Singh
- Manager: Dave Challinor (until 1 November); Graeme Lee (until 5 May)
- Stadium: Victoria Park
- League Two: 17th
- FA Cup: Fourth round (eliminated by Crystal Palace)
- EFL Cup: First round (eliminated by Crewe Alexandra)
- EFL Trophy: Semi-finals (eliminated by Rotherham United)
- Top goalscorer: League: Luke Molyneux (8); All: Luke Molyneux (12)
- Highest home attendance: 7,542 (vs. Rotherham United)
- Lowest home attendance: 1,572 (vs. Morecambe)
- Average home league attendance: 5,195
- Biggest win: 3–0 (vs. Sheffield Wednesday)
- Biggest defeat: 5–0 (vs. Leyton Orient)
| Home colours | Away colours |

The 2021–22 season was Hartlepool United's 113th year in existence and their first season back in League Two after 4 years. Along with competing in League Two, the club also participated in the FA Cup, EFL Cup and EFL Trophy. The season covered the period from 1 July 2021 to 30 June 2022.

== Players ==
As of the end of the season

=== First-team squad ===
Note: Flags indicate national team as defined under FIFA eligibility rules; some limited exceptions apply. Players may hold more than one non-FIFA nationality.

| No. | Pos. | Nation | Player |
|---|---|---|---|
| 1 | GK | ENG | Ben Killip |
| 2 | DF | ENG | Jamie Sterry |
| 3 | DF | ENG | David Ferguson |
| 4 | DF | ENG | Gary Liddle |
| 5 | DF | ENG | Timi Odusina |
| 6 | MF | ENG | Mark Shelton |
| 7 | FW | ENG | Omar Bogle |
| 8 | MF | ENG | Nicky Featherstone |
| 10 | MF | ENG | Luke Molyneux |
| 11 | FW | ENG | Marcus Carver |
| 12 | FW | ENG | Joe Grey |

| No. | Pos. | Nation | Player |
|---|---|---|---|
| 13 | GK | ENG | Patrick Boyes |
| 15 | DF | ENG | Jake Hull |
| 16 | DF | IRL | Neill Byrne |
| 18 | MF | ENG | Martin Smith |
| 19 | FW | ENG | Jordan Cook |
| 20 | DF | AUS | Reagan Ogle |
| 21 | MF | ENG | Isaac Fletcher |
| 22 | MF | ENG | Tom Crawford |
| 28 | MF | ENG | Bryn Morris |
| 30 | MF | ENG | Joe White |
| 31 | GK | AUS | Nicholas Bilokapic |

== Transfers ==
=== Transfers in ===
| Date | Position | Name | From | Fee | Ref |
|---|---|---|---|---|---|
| 12 July 2021 | DF | Reagan Ogle | Accrington Stanley | Free | |
| 16 July 2021 | MF | Martin Smith | Chesterfield | Free | |
| 16 July 2021 | DF | Neill Byrne | FC Halifax Town | Undisclosed | |
| 21 July 2021 | FW | Olufela Olomola | Scunthorpe United | Free | |
| 1 August 2021 | DF | Jake Lawlor | Harrogate Town | Free | |
| 1 August 2021 | FW | Mark Cullen | Port Vale | Free | |
| 6 August 2021 | GK | Jonathan Mitchell | Derby County | Free | |
| 30 August 2021 | DF | Luke Hendrie | Grimsby Town | Free | |
| 16 September 2021 | FW | Jordan Cook | Gateshead | Free | |
| 16 September 2021 | FW | Mike Fondop | Burton Albion | Free | |
| 25 October 2021 | GK | Patrick Boyes | Grimsby Town | Free | |
| 10 January 2022 | FW | Marcus Carver | Southport | Undisclosed | |
| 27 January 2022 | FW | Omar Bogle | Doncaster Rovers | Free | |

=== Loans in ===
| Date | Position | Player | From | End date | Ref |
|---|---|---|---|---|---|
| 5 August 2021 | MF | Tyler Burey | Millwall | 1 January 2022 | |
| 5 August 2021 | MF | Matty Daly | Huddersfield Town | 17 January 2022 (Note: On 17 January, Daly was recalled by his parent club Huddersfield Town.) | |
| 11 August 2021 | FW | Will Goodwin | Stoke City | 1 January 2022 | |
| 31 August 2021 | DF | Eddy Jones | Stoke City | 10 January 2022 | |
| 10 January 2022 | DF | Jake Hull | Rotherham United | 30 June 2022 | |
| 26 January 2022 | MF | Isaac Fletcher | Middlesbrough | 30 June 2022 | |
| 29 January 2022 | MF | Joe White | Newcastle United | 30 June 2022 | |
| 31 January 2022 | GK | Nicholas Bilokapic | Huddersfield Town | 30 June 2022 | |
| 31 January 2022 | MF | Bryn Morris | Burton Albion | 30 June 2022 | |

=== Loans out ===
| Date | Position | Player | To | End date | Ref |
|---|---|---|---|---|---|
| 13 August 2021 | MF | Josh MacDonald | Whitby Town | 30 June 2022 | |
| 22 September 2021 | DF | Jake Lawlor | Bromley | 26 October 2021 | |
| 12 November 2021 | DF | Jake Lawlor | Darlington | 12 January 2022 | |
| 11 February 2022 | FW | Olufela Olomola | Yeovil Town | 21 April 2022 | |
| 24 March 2022 | DF | Zaine Francis-Angol | Stockport County | 30 June 2022 | |

=== Transfers out ===
| Date | Position | Name | To | Fee | Ref |
|---|---|---|---|---|---|
| 27 June 2021 | DF | Ryan Johnson | Port Vale | Free | |
| 1 July 2021 | FW | Mason Bloomfield | Barnet | Free | |
| 6 July 2021 | GK | Brad Young | Leicester City | Undisclosed | |
| 8 July 2021 | FW | Rhys Oates | Mansfield Town | Free | |
| 13 July 2021 | FW | Danny Elliott | Boston United | Free | |
| 16 July 2021 | MF | Ryan Donaldson | Morpeth Town | Free | |
| 11 August 2021 | MF | Claudio Ofosu | Kettering Town | Free | |
| 14 August 2021 | MF | Luke Williams | Gateshead | Free | |
| 26 October 2021 | DF | Aaron Cunningham | Spennymoor Town | Free | |
| 20 January 2022 | DF | Jake Lawlor | Darlington | Free | |
| 21 January 2022 | GK | Jonathan Mitchell | Doncaster Rovers | Free | |
| 31 January 2022 | FW | Mike Fondop | Oldham Athletic | Free | |
| 31 January 2022 | DF | Luke Hendrie | Bradford City | Free | |
| 22 February 2022 | FW | Mark Cullen | A.F.C. Fylde | Free | |
| 22 March 2022 | MF | Gavan Holohan | Grimsby Town | Free | |

== Competitions ==
=== Pre-season friendlies ===
On 5 July 2021, Hartlepool's pre-season schedule was announced.

| 17 July 2021 Friendly | Runcorn Linnets | 1–9 | Hartlepool United | Runcorn |
| 15:00 | Lynch 2' | | Holohan 7'; Trialist 19'; Cullen 38'; Olomola 57', 60', 79', 83'; Trialist 74', 80' | Stadium: Millbank Linnets Stadium, |

| 20 July 2021 Friendly | Spennymoor Town | 1–0 | Hartlepool United | Spennymoor |
| 19:45 | Mulhern 10' | | | Stadium: The Brewery Field, Attendance: 985 |

| 24 July 2021 Friendly | Gateshead | 4–1 | Hartlepool United | Gateshead |
| 15:00 | Scott 32', 40'; Langstaff 46'; Olley 61' | Report | Trialist 10' | Stadium: International Stadium |

| 27 July 2021 Friendly | Blyth Spartans | 2–1 | Hartlepool United | Blyth |
| 19:30 | Hickey 9'; O'Donnell 74' | Report | Featherstone 78' | Stadium: Croft Park; Attendance: 815 |

| 31 July 2021 Friendly | Dunston UTS | 0–5 | Hartlepool United | Dunston |
| 15:00 | | Report | Olomola 6'; Shelton 28', 34' (pen.); Close 37', 73' | Stadium: UTS Stadium; Attendance: 368 |

=== League Two ===
==== League table ====
| Pos | Team | Pld | W | D | L | GF | GA | GD | Pts |
|---|---|---|---|---|---|---|---|---|---|
| 14 | Bradford City | 46 | 14 | 16 | 16 | 53 | 55 | −2 | 58 |
| 15 | Colchester United | 46 | 14 | 13 | 19 | 48 | 60 | −12 | 55 |
| 16 | Walsall | 46 | 14 | 12 | 20 | 47 | 60 | −13 | 54 |
| 17 | Hartlepool United | 46 | 14 | 12 | 20 | 44 | 64 | −20 | 54 |
| 18 | Rochdale | 46 | 12 | 17 | 17 | 51 | 59 | −8 | 53 |
| 19 | Harrogate Town | 46 | 14 | 11 | 21 | 64 | 75 | −11 | 53 |
| 20 | Carlisle United | 46 | 14 | 11 | 21 | 39 | 62 | −23 | 53 |

Source: EFL Official Website
Rules for classification: 1) Points; 2) Goal difference; 3) Number of goals scored; 4) Head-to-head results; 5) Wins; 6) Away goals; 7) Penalty points (sec 9.5); 8) 12-point sending off offences

==== Results summary ====
| Overall | | | | | | | | Home | | | | | | Away | | | | | |
| Pld | W | D | L | GF | GA | GD | Pts | W | D | L | GF | GA | GD | W | D | L | GF | GA | GD |
|---|---|---|---|---|---|---|---|---|---|---|---|---|---|---|---|---|---|---|---|
| 46 | 14 | 12 | 20 | 44 | 64 | −20 | 54 | 9 | 7 | 7 | 24 | 26 | −2 | 5 | 5 | 13 | 20 | 38 | −18 |

==== Results by matchday ====
| Round | 1 | 2 | 3 | 4 | 5 | 6 | 7 | 8 | 9 | 10 | 11 | 12 | 13 | 14 | 15 | 16 | 17 | 18 | 19 | 20 | 21 | 22 | 23 | 24 | 25 | 26 | 27 | 28 | 29 | 30 | 31 | 32 | 33 | 34 | 35 | 36 | 37 | 38 | 39 | 40 | 41 | 42 | 43 | 44 | 45 | 46 |
|---|---|---|---|---|---|---|---|---|---|---|---|---|---|---|---|---|---|---|---|---|---|---|---|---|---|---|---|---|---|---|---|---|---|---|---|---|---|---|---|---|---|---|---|---|---|---|
| Ground | H | A | H | H | A | H | A | A | H | A | H | A | A | H | A | H | H | A | A | H | H | A | H | A | A | H | A | H | A | H | H | A | A | A | H | H | A | A | H | H | A | H | A | H | A | H |
| Result | W | L | W | W | L | W | L | D | D | L | W | L | W | W | L | L | L | L | L | W | D | L | D | L | D | D | D | W | W | W | D | W | L | W | D | L | W | L | D | L | D | L | L | L | D | L |
| Position | 5 | 12 | 7 | 5 | 7 | 4 | 5 | 6 | 7 | 13 | 8 | 11 | 9 | 7 | 10 | 10 | 12 | 15 | 17 | 12 | 13 | 15 | 15 | 17 | 17 | 16 | 16 | 15 | 15 | 14 | 12 | 12 | 12 | 12 | 12 | 12 | 11 | 13 | 12 | 12 | 13 | 13 | 14 | 15 | 16 | 17 |

Source: InTheMadCrowd
A = Away; H = Home; W = Win; D = Draw; L = Loss

==== Matches ====
Hartlepool United's league fixtures were released on 24 June 2021.

| 7 August 2021 1 | Hartlepool United | 1–0 | Crawley Town | Hartlepool |
| 15:00 | Holohan 88' | Report | | Stadium: Victoria Park; Attendance: 5,184; Referee: Scott Oldham |

| 14 August 2021 2 | Barrow | 3–2 | Hartlepool United | Barrow-in-Furness |
| 15:00 | Zanzala 3'; Gordon 47'; Sea 72' | Report | Burey 17'; Goodwin 61' | Stadium: Holker Street; Attendance: 2,846; Referee: Darren Drysdale |

| 21 August 2021 3 | Hartlepool United | 2–0 | Walsall | Hartlepool |
| 15:00 | Burey 23'; Featherstone 57' (pen.) | Report | | Stadium: Victoria Park; Attendance: 4,677; Referee: Declan Bourne |

| 28 August 2021 4 | Hartlepool United | 2–1 | Carlisle United | Hartlepool |
| 15:00 | Burey 13'; Holohan 69' | Report | Clough 38' | Stadium: Victoria Park; Attendance: 6,112; Referee: Andy Woolmer |

| 4 September 2021 5 | Tranmere Rovers | 1–0 | Hartlepool United | Birkenhead |
| 15:00 | Davies 89' | Report | | Stadium: Prenton Park; Attendance: 6,707; Referee: Chris Sarginson |

| 11 September 2021 6 | Hartlepool United | 1–0 | Bristol Rovers | Hartlepool |
| 15:00 | Sterry 69' | Report | | Stadium: Victoria Park; Attendance: 5,193; Referee: Rebecca Welch |

| 14 September 2021 7 | Sutton United | 1–0 | Hartlepool United | Sutton |
| 19:45 | Goodliffe 25' | Report | | Stadium: VBS Community Stadium; Attendance: 2,484; Referee: Simon Hooper |

| 18 September 2021 8 | Oldham Athletic | 0–0 | Hartlepool United | Oldham |
| 15:00 | | Report | | Stadium: Boundary Park; Attendance: 3,934; Referee: Charles Breakspear |

| 25 September 2021 9 | Hartlepool United | 1–1 | Exeter City | Hartlepool |
| 15:00 | Molyneux 25' | Report | Nombe 41' | Stadium: Victoria Park; Attendance: 5,194; Referee: Leigh Doughty |

| 2 October 2021 10 | Stevenage | 2–0 | Hartlepool United | Stevenage |
| 15:00 | Reid 21'; List 46' | Report | | Stadium: Broadhall Way; Attendance: 2,633; Referee: Ben Speedie |

| 9 October 2021 11 | Hartlepool United | 2–1 | Northampton Town | Hartlepool |
| 15:00 | Ferguson 53'; Molyneux 83' | Report | Hoskins 51' | Stadium: Victoria Park; Attendance: 5,522; Referee: Ben Toner |

| 16 October 2021 12 | Salford City | 2–0 | Hartlepool United | Salford |
| 15:00 | Elliott 3'; Willock 86' | Report | | Stadium: Moor Lane; Attendance: 2,448; Referee: Peter Wright |

| 19 October 2021 13 | Bradford City | 1–3 | Hartlepool United | Bradford |
| 19:45 | O'Connor 72' | Report | Cullen 1', 59'; Songo'o 90' (o.g.) | Stadium: Valley Parade; Attendance: 14,344; Referee: Tom Nield |

| 23 October 2021 14 | Hartlepool United | 3–2 | Harrogate Town | Hartlepool |
| 15:00 | Ferguson 52'; Cullen 53'; Daly 69' | Report | Thomson 28'; Byrne 35' (o.g.) | Stadium: Victoria Park; Attendance: 5,807; Referee: James Oldham |

| 30 October 2021 15 | Leyton Orient | 5–0 | Hartlepool United | London |
| 15:00 | Drinan 20', 84', 90'; Smith 35'; James 56' | Report | | Stadium: Brisbane Road; Attendance: 6,233; Referee: Alan Young |

| 12 November 2021 16 | Hartlepool United | 1–2 | Newport County | Hartlepool |
| 19:45 | Ferguson 63' | Report | Baker-Richardson 32'; Telford 90' | Stadium: Suit Direct Stadium; Attendance: 5,764; Referee: Sam Barrott |

| 20 November 2021 17 | Hartlepool United | 1–3 | Forest Green Rovers | Hartlepool |
| 15:00 | Featherstone 80' (pen.) | Report | Moore-Taylor 4'; Matt 29'; Stevens 45' | Stadium: Suit Direct Stadium; Attendance: 5,612; Referee: Steve Martin |

| 23 November 2021 18 | Swindon Town | 3–1 | Hartlepool United | Swindon |
| 19:45 | Williams 52'; Simpson 69'; Payne 45' | Report | Daly 61' | Stadium: County Ground; Attendance: 7,714; Referee: Lee Swabey |

| 27 November 2021 19 | Port Vale | 2–0 | Hartlepool United | Stoke-on-Trent |
| 15:00 | Garrity 31'; Pett 90' | Report | | Stadium: Vale Park; Attendance: 4,839; Referee: Tom Reeves |

| 8 December 2021 20 | Hartlepool United | 2–1 | Rochdale | Hartlepool |
| 19:45 | Cullen 64'; Shelton 90' | Report | Andrews 55' | Stadium: Suit Direct Stadium; Attendance: 4,214; Referee: Tom Nield |

| 11 December 2021 21 | Hartlepool United | 0–0 | Scunthorpe United | Hartlepool |
| 15:00 | | Report | | Stadium: Suit Direct Stadium; Attendance: 4,809; Referee: Robert Lewis |

| 26 December 2021 22 | Mansfield Town | 3–2 | Hartlepool United | Mansfield |
| 15:00 | O'Toole 55'; Bowery 62'; Maris 66' | Report | Molyneux 25'; Featherstone 51' | Stadium: Field Mill; Attendance: 5,558; Referee: Simon Mather |

| 1 January 2022 23 | Hartlepool United | 0–0 | Oldham Athletic | Hartlepool |
| 15:00 | | Report | | Stadium: Suit Direct Stadium; Attendance: 5,026; Referee: Darren Handley |

| 15 January 2022 24 | Bristol Rovers | 2–0 | Hartlepool United | Bristol |
| 15:00 | Collins 87'; Evans 90' | Report | | Stadium: Memorial Stadium; Attendance: 7,004; Referee: Carl Brook |

| 18 January 2022 25 | Carlisle United | 0–0 | Hartlepool United | Carlisle |
| 19:45 | | Report | | Stadium: Brunton Park; Attendance: 4,570; Referee: Ollie Yates |

| 22 January 2022 26 | Hartlepool United | 1–1 | Stevenage | Hartlepool |
| 15:00 | Featherstone 77' | Report | Norris 70' (pen.) | Stadium: Suit Direct Stadium; Attendance: 4,841; Referee: Martin Coy |

| 29 January 2022 27 | Exeter City | 0–0 | Hartlepool United | Exeter |
| 15:00 | | Report | | Stadium: St James Park; Attendance: 5,121; Referee: Tom Reeves |

| 8 February 2022 28 | Hartlepool United | 3–1 | Barrow | Hartlepool |
| 19:45 | Molyneux 27', 39'; Bogle 44' | Report | Rooney 17' | Stadium: Suit Direct Stadium; Attendance: 4,621; Referee: Peter Wright |

| 12 February 2022 29 | Crawley Town | 0–1 | Hartlepool United | Crawley |
| 15:00 | | Report | Bogle 40' | Stadium: Broadfield Stadium; Attendance: 2,228; Referee: Brett Huxtable |

| 15 February 2022 30 | Hartlepool United | 1–0 | Tranmere Rovers | Hartlepool |
| 19:45 | Clarke 45' (o.g.) | Report | | Stadium: Suit Direct Stadium; Attendance: 5,214; Referee: Rebecca Welch |

| 19 February 2022 31 | Hartlepool United | 1–1 | Sutton United | Hartlepool |
| 15:00 | Crawford 51' | Report | Kizzi 3' | Stadium: Suit Direct Stadium; Attendance: 5,487; Referee: Andrew Kitchen |

| 22 February 2022 32 | Colchester United | 1–2 | Hartlepool United | Colchester |
| 19:45 | Chilvers 22' | Report | Bogle 70'; Fletcher 74' | Stadium: Colchester Community Stadium; Attendance: 2,115; Referee: Declan Bourne |

| 26 February 2022 33 | Walsall | 3–1 | Hartlepool United | Walsall |
| 15:00 | Miller 13', 67'; Wilkinson 26' | Report | Bogle 63' | Stadium: Bescot Stadium; Attendance: 4,760; Referee: Lee Swabey |

| 5 March 2022 34 | Harrogate Town | 1–2 | Hartlepool United | Harrogate |
| 12:30 | Armstrong 21' | Report | Molyneux 25'; Ferguson 62' | Stadium: The EnviroVent Stadium; Attendance: 2,638; Referee: Carl Boyeson |

| 12 March 2022 35 | Hartlepool United | 0–0 | Leyton Orient | Hartlepool |
| 15:00 | | Report | | Stadium: Suit Direct Stadium; Attendance: 5,903; Referee: James Oldham |

| 15 March 2022 36 | Hartlepool United | 0–2 | Bradford City | Hartlepool |
| 19:45 | | Report | Foulds 70'; Songo'o 76' | Stadium: Suit Direct Stadium; Attendance: 5,106; Referee: Jeremy Simpson |

| 18 March 2022 37 | Newport County | 2–3 | Hartlepool United | Newport |
| 19:45 | Bogle 16' (o.g.); Street 71' | Report | Sterry 35'; Molyneux 45'; Byrne 73' | Stadium: Rodney Parade; Attendance: 4,768; Referee: Alan Young |

| 26 March 2022 38 | Northampton Town | 2–0 | Hartlepool United | Northampton |
| 15:00 | Hoskins 6'; Zimba 61' | Report | | Stadium: Sixfields Stadium; Attendance: 5,673; Referee: Keith Stroud |

| 29 March 2022 39 | Hartlepool United | 2–2 | Mansfield Town | Hartlepool |
| 19:45 | Grey 41'; Molyneux 43' | Report | Lapslie 21'; Perch 25' | Stadium: Suit Direct Stadium; Attendance: 4,577; Referee: Trevor Kettle |

| 2 April 2022 40 | Hartlepool United | 0–2 | Salford City | Hartlepool |
| 15:00 | | Report | Ndaba 19'; Lowe 28' | Stadium: Suit Direct Stadium; Attendance: 4,949; Referee: Darren Drysdale |

| 9 April 2022 41 | Forest Green Rovers | 1–1 | Hartlepool United | Nailsworth |
| 15:00 | Hendry 53' | Report | Bogle 68' | Stadium: The New Lawn; Attendance: 3,023; Referee: Sam Purkiss |

| 15 April 2022 42 | Hartlepool United | 0–1 | Port Vale | Hartlepool |
| 15:00 | | Report | Hall 67' | Stadium: Suit Direct Stadium; Attendance: 5,517; Referee: Chris Sarginson |

| 18 April 2022 43 | Rochdale | 2–1 | Hartlepool United | Rochdale |
| 15:00 | Keohane 61'; O'Connell 90' | Report | Morris 10' | Stadium: Spotland Stadium; Attendance: 2,900; Referee: Tom Nield |

| 23 April 2022 44 | Hartlepool United | 0–3 | Swindon Town | Hartlepool |
| 15:00 | | Report | McKirdy 40', 55'; Baudry 85' | Stadium: Suit Direct Stadium; Attendance: 4,786; Referee: Andy Haines |

| 30 April 2022 45 | Scunthorpe United | 1–1 | Hartlepool United | Scunthorpe |
| 15:00 | Wilson 49' | Report | Featherstone 72' (pen.) | Stadium: Glanford Park; Attendance: 4,210; Referee: Will Finnie |

| 7 May 2022 46 | Hartlepool United | 0–2 | Colchester United | Hartlepool |
| 15:00 | | Report | Akinde 9'; Cooper 53' | Stadium: Suit Direct Stadium; Attendance: 5,375; Referee: Ben Toner |

=== FA Cup ===
Hartlepool were drawn at home to Wycombe Wanderers in the first round, away to Lincoln City in the second round and at home to Blackpool in the third round.

| 6 November 2021 First round | Hartlepool United | 2–2 | Wycombe Wanderers | Hartlepool |
| 15:00 | Cullen 45'; Molyneux 65' | Report | Forino-Joseph 63'; Jacobson 74' (pen.) | Stadium: Victoria Park; Attendance: 4,271; Referee: Darren Drysdale |

| 16 November 2021 Replay | Wycombe Wanderers | 0–1 | Hartlepool United | High Wycombe |
| 19:45 | | Report | Cullen 20' | Stadium: Adams Park; Attendance: 1,582; Referee: Christopher Pollard |

| 4 December 2021 Second round | Lincoln City | 0–1 | Hartlepool United | Lincoln |
| 15:00 | | Report | Fiorini 52' (o.g.) | Stadium: LNER Stadium; Attendance: 5,506; Referee: Bobby Madley |

| 8 January 2022 Third round | Hartlepool United | 2–1 | Blackpool | Hartlepool |
| 12:30 | Ferguson 48'; Grey 61' | Report | Anderson 8' | Stadium: Suit Direct Stadium; Attendance: 4,932; Referee: Matt Donohue |

| 5 February 2022 Fourth round | Crystal Palace | 2–0 | Hartlepool United | Selhurst |
| 15:00 | Guéhi 4'; Olise 22' | Report | | Stadium: Selhurst Park; Attendance: 22,114; Referee: Peter Bankes |

=== EFL Cup ===
Hartlepool United were drawn at home to Crewe Alexandra in the first round.

| 10 August 2021 First round | Hartlepool United | 0–1 | Crewe Alexandra | Hartlepool |
| 19:00 | | Report | Ainley 50' | Stadium: Victoria Park; Attendance: 3,149; Referee: Thomas Bramall |

=== EFL Trophy ===
Hartlepool were drawn into Northern Group A alongside Carlisle United, Everton U21s and Morecambe. On 6 July 2021, the date and times of the fixtures were announced. In the knock-out stages, United were drawn at home to Bolton Wanderers in the third round.

| Pos | Div | Team | Pld | W | PW | PL | L | GF | GA | GD | Pts | Qualification |
|---|---|---|---|---|---|---|---|---|---|---|---|---|
| 1 | L2 | Carlisle United | 3 | 2 | 1 | 0 | 0 | 7 | 3 | +4 | 8 | Advance to Round 2 |
| 2 | L2 | Hartlepool United | 3 | 1 | 1 | 1 | 0 | 6 | 5 | +1 | 6 | Advance to Round 2 |
| 3 | ACA | Everton U21 | 3 | 1 | 0 | 0 | 2 | 1 | 3 | −2 | 3 | |
| 4 | L1 | Morecambe | 3 | 0 | 0 | 1 | 2 | 2 | 5 | −3 | 1 | |

Source: EFL.com

| 31 August 2021 Group stage | Carlisle United | 3–3 (4–3 p) | Hartlepool United | Carlisle |
| 19:00 | Charters 11'; Mampala 58'; Abrahams 78' | | Daly 18'; Molyneux 81'; Olomola 89' (pen.) | Stadium: Brunton Park; Attendance: 1,360; Referee: James Bell |
| | Penalties |
| | Clough (penalty scored); Abrahams (penalty missed); Young (penalty scored); Armer (penalty scored); Charters (penalty scored) | | Burey (penalty missed); Daly (penalty scored); Olomola (penalty scored); Crawford (penalty missed); Molyneux (penalty scored) |

| 5 October 2021 Group stage | Hartlepool United | 2–2 (4–2 p) | Morecambe | Hartlepool |
| 19:00 | Daly 8', 83' | Report | McLoughlin 33'; Jones 40' (pen.) | Stadium: Victoria Park; Attendance: 1,572; Referee: Simon Mather |
| | Penalties |
| | Daly (penalty scored); Molyneux (penalty scored); Ferguson (penalty scored); Crawford (penalty scored) | | Cooney (penalty scored); McLoughlin (penalty missed); Gnahoua (penalty missed); Jones (penalty scored) |

| 2 November 2021 Group stage | Hartlepool United | 1–0 | Everton U21 | Hartlepool |
| 19:00 | Daly 71' | Report | | Stadium: Victoria Park; Attendance: 1,990; Referee: Anthony Backhouse |

| 1 December 2021 Second round | Sheffield Wednesday | 0–3 | Hartlepool United | Sheffield |
| 19:00 | | Report | Shelton 11'; Brown 14' (o.g.); Goodwin 59' | Stadium: Hillsborough; Attendance: 5,109; Referee: Andy Haines |

| 4 January 2022 Third round | Hartlepool United | 1–0 | Bolton Wanderers | Hartlepool |
| 19:45 | Daly 84' | Report | | Stadium: Suit Direct Stadium; Attendance: 2,529; Referee: Anthony Backhouse |

| 25 January 2022 Quarter-final | Hartlepool United | 2–2 (5–4 p) | Charlton Athletic | Hartlepool |
| 19:00 | Grey 7'; Molyneux 73' | Report | Burstow 17'; Gilbey 32' | Stadium: Suit Direct Stadium; Attendance: 3,615; Referee: Simon Mather |
| | Penalties |
| | Cullen (penalty scored); Crawford (penalty scored); Shelton (penalty scored); Molyneux (penalty scored); Sterry (penalty scored) | | Washington (penalty scored); Gilbey (penalty scored); Clare (penalty scored); Lee (penalty missed); Aneke (penalty scored) |

| 9 March 2022 Semi-final | Hartlepool United | 2–2 (4–5 p) | Rotherham United | Hartlepool |
| 19:45 | Grey 29'; Molyneux 55' | Report | Smith 50', 63' | Stadium: Suit Direct Stadium; Attendance: 7,542; Referee: Robert Madley |
| | Penalties |
| | Featherstone (penalty scored); Sterry (penalty scored); Shelton (penalty scored); Molyneux (penalty missed); Bogle (penalty scored); Crawford (penalty missed) | | Smith (penalty scored); Ferguson (penalty scored); Barlaser (penalty scored); Wiles (penalty missed); MacDonald (penalty scored); Miller (penalty scored) |

== Squad statistics ==
=== Appearances and goals ===
| No. | Pos | Nat | Player | Total | | League Two | | FA Cup | | League Cup | | EFL Trophy | |
| No. | Pos | Nat | Player | Apps | Goals | Apps | Goals | Apps | Goals | Apps | Goals | Apps | Goals |
|---|---|---|---|---|---|---|---|---|---|---|---|---|---|
| 1 | GK | (England) ENG | Ben Killip | 49 | 0 | 42 | 0 | 4 | 0 | 0 | 0 | 3 | 0 |
| 2 | DF | (England) ENG | Jamie Sterry | 44 | 2 | 37 | 2 | 3 | 0 | 1 | 0 | 3 | 0 |
| 3 | DF | (England) ENG | David Ferguson | 52 | 5 | 42 | 4 | 5 | 1 | 1 | 0 | 4 | 0 |
| 4 | DF | (England) ENG | Gary Liddle | 38 | 0 | 32 | 0 | 5 | 0 | 1 | 0 | 0 | 0 |
| 5 | DF | (England) ENG | Timi Odusina | 43 | 0 | 31 | 0 | 4 | 0 | 1 | 0 | 7 | 0 |
| 6 | MF | (England) ENG | Mark Shelton | 41 | 2 | 33 | 1 | 4 | 0 | 0 | 0 | 4 | 1 |
| 7 | MF | (England) ENG | Tyler Burey | 9 | 3 | 7 | 3 | 0 | 0 | 1 | 0 | 1 | 0 |
| 7 | FW | (England) ENG | Omar Bogle | 21 | 5 | 20 | 5 | 1 | 0 | 0 | 0 | 0 | 0 |
| 8 | MF | (England) ENG | Nicky Featherstone | 47 | 5 | 40 | 5 | 4 | 0 | 1 | 0 | 2 | 0 |
| 9 | FW | (England) ENG | Mark Cullen | 27 | 6 | 17 | 4 | 5 | 2 | 1 | 0 | 4 | 0 |
| 10 | FW | (England) ENG | Luke Molyneux | 55 | 12 | 43 | 8 | 5 | 1 | 1 | 0 | 6 | 3 |
| 11 | FW | (England) ENG | Will Goodwin | 15 | 2 | 10 | 1 | 1 | 0 | 0 | 0 | 4 | 1 |
| 11 | FW | (England) ENG | Marcus Carver | 18 | 0 | 17 | 0 | 0 | 0 | 0 | 0 | 1 | 0 |
| 12 | FW | (England) ENG | Joe Grey | 37 | 4 | 28 | 1 | 4 | 1 | 0 | 0 | 5 | 2 |
| 14 | MF | (Republic of Ireland) IRL | Gavan Holohan | 22 | 2 | 18 | 2 | 4 | 0 | 0 | 0 | 0 | 0 |
| 15 | DF | (Wales) WAL | Eddy Jones | 6 | 0 | 3 | 0 | 0 | 0 | 0 | 0 | 3 | 0 |
| 15 | DF | (England) ENG | Jake Hull | 7 | 0 | 7 | 0 | 0 | 0 | 0 | 0 | 0 | 0 |
| 16 | DF | (Republic of Ireland) IRL | Neill Byrne | 51 | 1 | 40 | 1 | 5 | 0 | 1 | 0 | 5 | 0 |
| 18 | MF | (England) ENG | Martin Smith | 15 | 0 | 7 | 0 | 1 | 0 | 1 | 0 | 6 | 0 |
| 19 | FW | (England) ENG | Jordan Cook | 5 | 0 | 4 | 0 | 0 | 0 | 0 | 0 | 1 | 0 |
| 20 | DF | (Australia) AUS | Reagan Ogle | 24 | 0 | 18 | 0 | 2 | 0 | 0 | 0 | 4 | 0 |
| 21 | MF | (England) ENG | Isaac Fletcher | 15 | 1 | 14 | 1 | 1 | 0 | 0 | 0 | 0 | 0 |
| 22 | MF | (England) ENG | Tom Crawford | 38 | 1 | 28 | 1 | 3 | 0 | 0 | 0 | 7 | 0 |
| 23 | DF | (Antigua and Barbuda) ANT | Zaine Francis-Angol | 22 | 0 | 16 | 0 | 1 | 0 | 1 | 0 | 4 | 0 |
| 24 | FW | (England) ENG | Olufela Olomola | 17 | 1 | 12 | 0 | 0 | 0 | 1 | 0 | 4 | 1 |
| 27 | DF | (England) ENG | Luke Hendrie | 11 | 0 | 7 | 0 | 1 | 0 | 1 | 0 | 2 | 0 |
| 28 | MF | (England) ENG | Matty Daly | 27 | 7 | 19 | 2 | 3 | 0 | 1 | 0 | 4 | 5 |
| 28 | MF | (England) ENG | Bryn Morris | 11 | 1 | 10 | 1 | 1 | 0 | 0 | 0 | 0 | 0 |
| 30 | DF | (England) ENG | Jake Lawlor | 2 | 0 | 1 | 0 | 0 | 0 | 0 | 0 | 1 | 0 |
| 30 | MF | (England) ENG | Joe White | 16 | 0 | 15 | 0 | 1 | 0 | 0 | 0 | 0 | 0 |
| 31 | GK | (Australia) AUS | Nicholas Bilokapic | 2 | 0 | 2 | 0 | 0 | 0 | 0 | 0 | 0 | 0 |
| 35 | GK | (England) ENG | Jonathan Mitchell | 8 | 0 | 2 | 0 | 1 | 0 | 1 | 0 | 4 | 0 |
| 36 | FW | (Cameroon) CMR | Mike Fondop | 13 | 0 | 8 | 0 | 2 | 0 | 0 | 0 | 3 | 0 |

=== Goalscorers ===
| Rank | Name | League Two | FA Cup | League Cup | Other | Total |
|---|---|---|---|---|---|---|
| 1 | Luke Molyneux | 8 | 1 | 0 | 3 | 12 |
| 2 | Matty Daly | 2 | 0 | 0 | 5 | 7 |
| 3 | Mark Cullen | 4 | 2 | 0 | 0 | 6 |
| 4 | Omar Bogle | 5 | 0 | 0 | 0 | 5 |
| 4 | Nicky Featherstone | 5 | 0 | 0 | 0 | 5 |
| 4 | David Ferguson | 4 | 1 | 0 | 0 | 5 |
| 5 | Joe Grey | 1 | 1 | 0 | 2 | 4 |
| 6 | Tyler Burey | 3 | 0 | 0 | 0 | 3 |
| 7 | Will Goodwin | 1 | 0 | 0 | 1 | 2 |
| 7 | Gavan Holohan | 2 | 0 | 0 | 0 | 2 |
| 7 | Mark Shelton | 1 | 0 | 0 | 1 | 2 |
| 7 | Jamie Sterry | 2 | 0 | 0 | 0 | 2 |
| 8 | Neill Byrne | 1 | 0 | 0 | 0 | 1 |
| 8 | Tom Crawford | 1 | 0 | 0 | 0 | 1 |
| 8 | Isaac Fletcher | 1 | 0 | 0 | 0 | 1 |
| 8 | Bryn Morris | 1 | 0 | 0 | 0 | 1 |
| 8 | Olufela Olomola | 0 | 0 | 0 | 1 | 1 |

=== Clean sheets ===
| Rank | Name | League Two | FA Cup | League Cup | Other | Total |
|---|---|---|---|---|---|---|
| 1 | Ben Killip | 11 | 2 | 0 | 1 | 14 |
| 2 | Jonathan Mitchell | 0 | 0 | 0 | 2 | 2 |

=== Suspensions ===
| Date Incurred | Name | Games Missed | Reason |
|---|---|---|---|
| 20 November 2021 | Jamie Sterry | 3 | (red card) (vs. Forest Green Rovers) |
| 15 January 2022 | Jamie Sterry | 2 | (red card) (vs. Bristol Rovers) |
| 29 January 2022 | Nicky Featherstone | 3 | (red card) (vs. Exeter City) |

== Awards ==
On 1 May 2022, Hartlepool's end of season awards were held at the Hardwick Hall Hotel in Sedgefield.

| End of Season Awards | Winner |
|---|---|
| Players' Player of the Season | Luke Molyneux |
| Fans' Player of the Season | Luke Molyneux |
| Young Player of the Season | Timi Odusina |
| Michael Maidens' Goal of the Season | Luke Molyneux vs Harrogate Town |
| Community Player of the Season | Jamie Sterry |
