= 2020–21 Hartlepool United F.C. season =

Hartlepool United
2020–21 season
- Owner: Raj Singh
- Chairman: Raj Singh
- Manager: Dave Challinor
- Stadium: Victoria Park
- National League: 4th (promoted via the play-offs)
- FA Cup: First round (eliminated by Salford City)
- FA Trophy: Third round (eliminated by FC Halifax Town)
- Top goalscorer: League: Rhys Oates (14); All: Rhys Oates (17)
- Biggest win: 7–2 (vs. Wealdstone)
- Biggest defeat: 5–0 (vs. Torquay United)
| Home colours | Away colours |

The 2020–21 season was Hartlepool United's 112th year in existence and their fourth consecutive season in the National League. Along with competing in the National League, the club also participated in the FA Cup and FA Trophy.

== Players ==
As of End of Season.

=== First-team squad ===
Note: Flags indicate national team as defined under FIFA eligibility rules; some limited exceptions apply. Players may hold more than one non-FIFA nationality.

| No. | Pos. | Nation | Player |
|---|---|---|---|
| 1 | GK | ENG | Ben Killip |
| 2 | DF | ENG | Lewis Cass |
| 3 | DF | ENG | David Ferguson |
| 4 | DF | ENG | Gary Liddle |
| 5 | DF | ENG | Timi Odusina |
| 6 | MF | ENG | Mark Shelton |
| 7 | MF | ENG | Ryan Donaldson |
| 8 | MF | ENG | Nicky Featherstone |
| 10 | FW | ENG | Mason Bloomfield |
| 10 | MF | ENG | Luke Molyneux |
| 11 | FW | ENG | Rhys Oates |
| 12 | FW | ENG | Joe Grey |

| No. | Pos. | Nation | Player |
|---|---|---|---|
| 13 | GK | ENG | Brad James |
| 14 | MF | IRL | Gavan Holohan |
| 15 | DF | ENG | Ryan Johnson |
| 16 | MF | ENG | Claudio Ofosu |
| 17 | MF | ENG | Josh MacDonald |
| 18 | MF | ENG | Luke Williams |
| 20 | DF | ENG | Aaron Cunningham |
| 22 | MF | ENG | Tom Crawford |
| 23 | DF | ENG | Jamie Sterry |
| 26 | DF | ANT | Zaine Francis-Angol |
| 27 | FW | ENG | Danny Elliott |
| 29 | FW | ENG | Luke Armstrong |

== Transfers ==
=== Transfers in ===
| Date | Position | Name | From | Fee | Ref |
|---|---|---|---|---|---|
| 1 August 2020 | DF | Gary Liddle | Walsall | Free | |
| 1 August 2020 | DF | Timi Odusina | Norwich City | Free | |
| 1 August 2020 | MF | Josh MacDonald | FC Halifax Town | Free | |
| 1 August 2020 | FW | Mark Shelton | Salford City | Free | |
| 1 August 2020 | FW | Rhys Oates | Morecambe | Free | |
| 3 August 2020 | MF | Claudio Ofosu | Royston Town | Free | |
| 5 August 2020 | DF | David Ferguson | York City | Free | |
| 5 August 2020 | FW | Mason Bloomfield | Norwich City | Free | |
| 24 August 2020 | MF | Tom Crawford | Notts County | Free | |
| 29 September 2020 | DF | Ryan Johnson | Rushall Olympic | Free | |
| 30 November 2020 | DF | Joe Bunney | Matlock Town | Free | |
| 21 December 2020 | DF | Jamie Sterry | South Shields | Free | |
| 14 April 2021 | FW | Danny Elliott | Chester | Free | |
| 22 April 2021 | DF | Zaine Francis-Angol | Boreham Wood | Free | |

=== Loans in ===
| Date | Position | Player | From | End date | Ref |
|---|---|---|---|---|---|
| 10 September 2020 | FW | David Parkhouse | Sheffield United | 30 June 2021 | |
| 1 October 2020 | GK | Henrich Ravas | Derby County | 30 June 2021 | |
| 1 October 2020 | DF | Lewis Cass | Newcastle United | 30 June 2021 | |
| 6 November 2020 | DF | Tyler Magloire | Blackburn Rovers | 9 January 2021 | |
| 7 December 2020 | FW | Luke Armstrong | Salford City | 30 June 2021 | |
| 5 February 2021 | MF | Tom White | Blackburn Rovers | 15 May 2021 | |
| 5 March 2021 | DF | Jake Cooper | Rotherham United | 30 June 2021 | |
| 1 April 2021 | FW | Richie Bennett | Stockport County | 26 April 2021 (Note: On 26 April, Bennett was recalled by his parent club Stockport County.) | |
| 22 April 2021 | GK | Brad James | Middlesbrough | 30 June 2021 | |
| 22 April 2021 | FW | Harvey Saunders | Fleetwood Town | 30 June 2021 | |

=== Loans out ===
| Date | Position | Player | To | End date | Ref |
|---|---|---|---|---|---|
| 5 October 2020 | DF | Aaron Cunningham | Blyth Spartans | 30 June 2021 | |
| 16 October 2020 | GK | Brad Young | Blyth Spartans | 30 June 2021 | |

=== Transfers out ===
| Date | Position | Name | To | Fee | Ref |
|---|---|---|---|---|---|
| 24 June 2020 | MF | Jason Kennedy | Spennymoor Town | Free | |
| 1 July 2020 | MF | Adam Bale | Retired | —N/a | |
| 9 July 2020 | DF | Michael Raynes | Ashton United | Free | |
| 17 July 2020 | DF | Mark Kitching | Stockport County | Free | |
| 20 July 2020 | FW | Luke James | Barrow | Free | |
| 25 July 2020 | FW | Lorne Bickley | Kettering Town | Free | |
| 27 July 2020 | DF | Fraser Kerr | Torquay United | Free | |
| 5 August 2020 | FW | Aidan Keena | Falkirk | Free | |
| 6 August 2020 | GK | Ryan Catterick | Marske United | Free | |
| 12 August 2020 | MF | Gus Mafuta | Boreham Wood | Free | |
| 18 August 2020 | FW | Gime Touré | Carlisle United | Free | |
| 19 August 2020 | FW | Niko Muir | Hampton & Richmond Borough | Free | |
| 21 August 2020 | DF | Brook Miller | Piteå IF | Free | |
| 25 August 2020 | GK | Dimitrios Konstantopoulos | Thornaby | Free | |
| 28 August 2020 | DF | Kenton Richardson | Sunderland | Free | |
| 31 August 2020 | DF | Myles Anderson | Weymouth | Free | |
| 15 September 2020 | MF | Josh Hawkes | Sunderland | Free | |
| 24 October 2020 | GK | Mitchell Beeney | Cheshunt | Free | |
| 1 February 2021 | DF | Joe Bunney | Grimsby Town | Free | |

== Competitions ==
=== Pre-season friendlies ===
| 31 August 2020 Friendly | Newcastle United U23 | 1–1 | Hartlepool United | Newcastle upon Tyne |
| 15:00 | Sørensen 3' (pen.) | Report | Ofosu 86' | Stadium: Darsley Park |

| 11 September 2020 Friendly | Morpeth Town | 1–5 | Hartlepool United | Morpeth |
| 19:00 | Noble 77' | Report | Ofosu 10'; Bloomfield 59'; Shelton 75'; Ferguson 89'; Donaldson 90' | Stadium: Craik Park; Attendance: 300 |

| 12 September 2020 Friendly | Blyth Spartans | 2–2 | Hartlepool United | Blyth |
| 15:00 | Thomson 14', 57' (pen.) | Report | Ferguson 26'; Parkhouse 45' | Stadium: Croft Park; Attendance: 0 |

| 19 September 2020 Friendly | Hartlepool United | 12–0 | Brandon United | Hartlepool |
| 15:00 | Ofosu 10'; Cunningham 13'; Williams 16', 20', 52', 70'; Bloomfield 23', 43'; Trialist 34'; Shelton 83', 84'; Holohan 90' | Report | | Stadium: Victoria Park; Attendance: 0 |

| 26 September 2020 Friendly | Gateshead | 1–4 | Hartlepool United | Gateshead |
| 15:00 | Langstaff 90' | Report | Liddle 28'; Grey 48'; Parkhouse 64'; Ofosu 80' | Stadium: International Stadium; Attendance: 0 |

=== National League ===
==== League table ====
| Pos | Team | Pld | W | D | L | GF | GA | GD | Pts | Promotion, qualification or relegation |
|---|---|---|---|---|---|---|---|---|---|---|
| 2 | Torquay United | 42 | 23 | 11 | 8 | 68 | 39 | +29 | 80 | Qualification for the National League play-off semi-finals |
| 3 | Stockport County | 42 | 21 | 14 | 7 | 69 | 32 | +37 | 77 | Qualification for the National League play-off semi-finals |
| 4 | Hartlepool United (O, P) | 42 | 22 | 10 | 10 | 66 | 43 | +23 | 76 | Qualification for the National League play-off quarter-finals |
| 5 | Notts County | 42 | 20 | 10 | 12 | 62 | 41 | +21 | 70 | Qualification for the National League play-off quarter-finals |
| 6 | Chesterfield | 42 | 21 | 6 | 15 | 60 | 43 | +17 | 69 | Qualification for the National League play-off quarter-finals |

Source: National League official site
Rules for classification: 1) Points; 2) Goal difference; 3) Number of goals scored; 4) Number of matches won; 5) Head-to-head results
(O) Play-off winners; (P) Promoted

==== Results summary ====
| Overall | | | | | | | | Home | | | | | | Away | | | | | |
| Pld | W | D | L | GF | GA | GD | Pts | W | D | L | GF | GA | GD | W | D | L | GF | GA | GD |
|---|---|---|---|---|---|---|---|---|---|---|---|---|---|---|---|---|---|---|---|
| 42 | 22 | 10 | 10 | 66 | 43 | +23 | 76 | 14 | 3 | 4 | 36 | 19 | +17 | 8 | 7 | 6 | 30 | 24 | +6 |

==== Results by matchday ====
| Round | 1 | 2 | 3 | 4 | 5 | 6 | 7 | 8 | 9 | 10 | 11 | 12 | 13 | 14 | 15 | 16 | 17 | 18 | 19 | 20 | 21 | 22 | 23 | 24 | 25 | 26 | 27 | 28 | 29 | 30 | 31 | 32 | 33 | 34 | 35 | 36 | 37 | 38 | 39 | 40 | 41 | 42 |
|---|---|---|---|---|---|---|---|---|---|---|---|---|---|---|---|---|---|---|---|---|---|---|---|---|---|---|---|---|---|---|---|---|---|---|---|---|---|---|---|---|---|---|
| Ground | H | A | A | H | H | H | H | A | A | A | H | H | A | H | H | A | H | A | H | H | A | H | A | H | A | A | A | H | A | H | A | A | H | A | H | A | H | A | H | A | A | H |
| Result | W | W | W | D | D | L | L | W | D | L | L | W | L | W | W | W | W | L | W | W | L | W | D | W | D | W | D | D | D | W | W | D | W | D | W | W | W | L | L | W | L | W |
| Position | 4 | 3 | 1 | 1 | 4 | 6 | 11 | 7 | 8 | 12 | 14 | 7 | 11 | 5 | 3 | 2 | 2 | 3 | 2 | 2 | 5 | 3 | 3 | 3 | 3 | 3 | 2 | 3 | 2 | 2 | 2 | 2 | 2 | 2 | 1 | 1 | 3 | 4 | 4 | 3 | 4 | 4 |

Source: InTheMadCrowd
A = Away; H = Home; W = Win; D = Draw; L = Loss

==== Matches ====
| 3 October 2020 1 | Hartlepool United | 2–1 | Aldershot Town | Hartlepool |
| 15:00 | Featherstone 34' (pen.); Holohan 88' | Report | Tanner 63' | Stadium: Victoria Park; Attendance: 0 Referee: Martin Woods |

| 6 October 2020 2 | Chesterfield | 1–2 | Hartlepool United | Chesterfield |
| 19:45 | Denton 53' (pen.) | Report | Evans 64' (o.g.); Johnson 69' | Stadium: Technique Stadium; Attendance: 0 Referee: Steven Copeland |

| 10 October 2020 3 | Maidenhead United | 0–4 | Hartlepool United | Maidenhead |
| 15:00 | | Report | Massey 45' (o.g.); Ofosu 47'; Johnson 51'; Holohan 83' | Stadium: York Road; Attendance: 0 Referee: Scott Tallis |

| 13 October 2020 4 | Hartlepool United | 0–0 | Bromley | Hartlepool |
| 19:45 | | Report | | Stadium: Victoria Park; Attendance: 0 Referee: Rebecca Welch |

| 27 October 2020 5 | Hartlepool United | 1–1 | Altrincham | Hartlepool |
| 19:45 | Parkhouse 30' | Report | Peers 85' | Stadium: Victoria Park; Attendance: 0 Referee: Andrew Miller |

| 31 October 2020 6 | Hartlepool United | 0–5 | Torquay United | Hartlepool |
| 17:20 | | Report | Wright 11', 15', 55'; Whitfield 36'; Warren 87' | Stadium: Victoria Park; Attendance: 0 Referee: Thomas Parsons |

| 17 November 2020 7 | Hartlepool United | 0–1 | Wrexham | Hartlepool |
| 19:00 | | Report | Durrell 54' | Stadium: Victoria Park; Attendance: 0 Referee: Lewis Smith |

| 21 November 2020 8 | Yeovil Town | 1–3 | Hartlepool United | Yeovil |
| 15:00 | Quigley 45' | Report | Molyneux 2'; Holohan 36'; Magloire 43' | Stadium: Huish Park; Attendance: 0 Referee: Adrian Quelch |

| 24 November 2020 9 | Barnet | 0–0 | Hartlepool United | Edgware |
| 19:00 | | Report | | Stadium: The Hive; Attendance: 0 Referee: Daniel Middleton |

| 1 December 2020 10 | Solihull Moors | 2–0 | Hartlepool United | Solihull |
| 19:45 | Pearce 62'; Ball 81' | Report | | Stadium: Damson Park; Attendance: 0 Referee: Thomas Parsons |

| 5 December 2020 11 | Hartlepool United | 1–2 | Boreham Wood | Hartlepool |
| 15:00 | Bloomfield 45' | Report | Hoskins 36', 68' | Stadium: Victoria Park; Attendance: 0 Referee: Peter Gibbons |

| 8 December 2020 12 | Hartlepool United | 2–0 | King's Lynn Town | Hartlepool |
| 19:00 | Armstrong 22', 52' | Report | | Stadium: Victoria Park; Attendance: 0 Referee: Adam Herczeg |

| 12 December 2020 13 | Woking | 3–0 | Hartlepool United | Woking |
| 15:00 | Jarvis 2'; Cook 17'; Spasov 59' | Report | | Stadium: Kingfield Stadium; Attendance: 799; Referee: Scott Tallis |

| 22 December 2020 14 | Hartlepool United | 4–0 | Stockport County | Hartlepool |
| 15:00 | Oates 6'; Johnson 47'; Armstrong 50', 90' | Report | | Stadium: Victoria Park; Attendance: 0 Referee: Paul Marsden |

| 26 December 2020 15 | Hartlepool United | 3–1 | FC Halifax Town | Hartlepool |
| 15:00 | Johnson 7'; Oates 57'; Bloomfield 89' | Report | Chadwick 13' | Stadium: Victoria Park; Attendance: 0 Referee: Andrew Kitchen |

| 28 December 2020 16 | Notts County | 0–1 | Hartlepool United | Nottingham |
| 15:00 | | Report | Armstrong 19' | Stadium: Meadow Lane; Attendance: 0 Referee: Simon Mather |

| 9 January 2021 17 | Hartlepool United | 3–1 | Wealdstone | Hartlepool |
| 15:00 | Armstrong 34'; Oates 54'; Featherstone 58' | Report | Mendy 75' | Stadium: Victoria Park; Attendance: 0 Referee: Adam Herczeg |

| 23 January 2021 18 | Weymouth | 1–0 | Hartlepool United | Weymouth |
| 15:00 | McQuoid 40' | Report | | Stadium: Bob Lucas Stadium; Attendance: 0 Referee: Matthew Russell |

| 30 January 2021 19 | Hartlepool United | 1–0 | Sutton United | Hartlepool |
| 15:00 | Oates 53' | Report | | Stadium: Victoria Park; Attendance: 0 Referee: Tom Reeves |

| 9 February 2021 20 | Hartlepool United | 2–0 | Solihull Moors | Hartlepool |
| 18:00 | Armstrong 11'; Ferguson 57' | Report | | Stadium: Victoria Park; Attendance: 0 Referee: Steven Copeland |

| 16 February 2021 21 | Eastleigh | 2–1 | Hartlepool United | Eastleigh |
| 17:00 | House 1'; Barnett 27' | Report | Grey 90' | Stadium: Silverlake Stadium; Attendance: 0 Referee: Scott Jackson |

| 20 February 2021 22 | Hartlepool United | 2–1 | Yeovil Town | Hartlepool |
| 15:00 | Armstrong 72'; Holohan 90' | Report | Knowles 54' | Stadium: Victoria Park; Attendance: 0 Referee: David Richardson |

| 23 February 2021 23 | Wrexham | 0–0 | Hartlepool United | Wrexham |
| 19:00 | | Report | | Stadium: Racecourse Ground; Attendance: 0 Referee: Jacob Miles |

| 27 February 2021 24 | Hartlepool United | 1–0 | Barnet | Hartlepool |
| 15:00 | Armstrong 32' | Report | | Stadium: Victoria Park; Attendance: 0 Referee: Lewis Smith |

| 2 March 2021 25 | FC Halifax Town | 1–1 | Hartlepool United | Halifax |
| 19:00 | Green 77' | Report | Shelton 12' | Stadium: The Shay; Attendance: 0 Referee: Gareth Rhodes |

| 6 March 2021 26 | Torquay United | 0–1 | Hartlepool United | Torquay |
| 15:00 | | Report | Molyneux 14' | Stadium: Plainmoor; Attendance: 0 Referee: Simon Mather |

| 9 March 2021 27 | Altrincham | 1–1 | Hartlepool United | Altrincham |
| 19:45 | Colclough 45' | Report | Oates 33' | Stadium: J. Davidson Stadium; Attendance: 0 Referee: Martin Woods |

| 13 March 2021 28 | Hartlepool United | 0–0 | Eastleigh | Hartlepool |
| 15:00 | | Report | | Stadium: Victoria Park; Attendance: 0 Referee: Andrew Kitchen |

| 16 March 2021 29 | King's Lynn Town | 2–2 | Hartlepool United | King's Lynn |
| 19:00 | Mitchell 16'; Gyasi 45' | Report | Armstrong 37'; Oates 64' | Stadium: The Walks; Attendance: 0 Referee: Robert Massey-Ellis |

| 20 March 2021 30 | Hartlepool United | 1–0 | Woking | Hartlepool |
| 15:00 | Oates 80' | Report | | Stadium: Victoria Park; Attendance: 0 Referee: Paul Marsden |

| 23 March 2021 31 | Dagenham & Redbridge | 0–1 | Hartlepool United | Dagenham |
| 19:00 | | Report | Armstrong 44' | Stadium: Victoria Road; Attendance: 0 Referee: Rob Whitton |

| 27 March 2021 32 | Stockport County | 1–1 | Hartlepool United | Stockport |
| 15:00 | Madden 78' | Report | Holohan 47' | Stadium: Edgeley Park; Attendance: 0 Referee: Lewis Smith |

| 2 April 2021 33 | Hartlepool United | 2–1 | Dagenham & Redbridge | Hartlepool |
| 13:00 | Oates 21'; Holohan 61' | Report | Robinson 32' | Stadium: Victoria Park; Attendance: 0 Referee: Adam Herczeg |

| 5 April 2021 34 | Boreham Wood | 2–2 | Hartlepool United | Borehamwood |
| 15:00 | Marsh 4'; Whitely 26' | Report | Holohan 5'; Bennett 77' | Stadium: Meadow Park; Attendance: 0 Referee: Alan Dale |

| 10 April 2021 35 | Hartlepool United | 2–0 | Notts County | Hartlepool |
| 17:20 | Holohan 45'; Bennett 86' | Report | | Stadium: Victoria Park; Attendance: 0 Referee: James Oldham |

| 17 April 2021 36 | Wealdstone | 2–7 | Hartlepool United | Ruislip |
| 12:30 | Lo-Everton 87'; Gondoh 90' | Report | Oates 25', 47'; Bennett 38', 41', 81' (pen.); Featherstone 63' (pen.); Shelton 76' | Stadium: Grosvenor Vale; Attendance: 0 Referee: Tom Reeves |

| 1 May 2021 37 | Hartlepool United | 3–1 | Chesterfield | Hartlepool |
| 17:20 | Oates 5'; Yarney 39' (o.g.); Armstrong 43' | Report | Kerr 60' | Stadium: Victoria Park; Attendance: 0 Referee: Daniel Middleton |

| 3 May 2021 38 | Bromley | 1–0 | Hartlepool United | Bromley |
| 15:00 | Arthurs 41' | Report | | Stadium: Hayes Lane; Attendance: 0 Referee: James Durkin |

| 8 May 2021 39 | Hartlepool United | 2–4 | Maidenhead United | Hartlepool |
| 15:00 | Oates 29'; Elliott 85' | Report | Orsi 15'; Barratt 38', 47', 55' | Stadium: Victoria Park; Attendance: 0 Referee: Martin Woods |

| 15 May 2021 40 | Aldershot Town | 1–3 | Hartlepool United | Aldershot |
| 15:00 | Bettamer 87' (pen.) | Report | Armstrong 59'; Oates 77'; Featherstone 90' (pen.) | Stadium: The EBB Stadium; Attendance: 0 Referee: Darren Drysdale |

| 23 May 2021 41 | Sutton United | 3–0 | Hartlepool United | Sutton |
| 12:45 | Milsom 35'; John 73'; Olaofe 80' | Report | | Stadium: Gander Green Lane; Attendance: 1,050; Referee: Simon Mather |

| 29 May 2021 42 | Hartlepool United | 4–0 | Weymouth | Hartlepool |
| 12:30 | Johnson 7'; Oates 33'; Shelton 63'; Holohan 78' | Report | | Stadium: Victoria Park; Attendance: 1,700; Referee: Adam Herczeg |

==== Play-offs ====
| 6 June 2021 Quarter-final | Hartlepool United | 3–2 | Bromley | Hartlepool |
| 14:30 | Oates 17', 24'; Armstrong 20' | Report | Alabi 48'; Webster 90' | Stadium: Victoria Park; Attendance: 1,700; Referee: Lewis Smith |

| 13 June 2021 Semi-final | Stockport County | 0–1 | Hartlepool United | Stockport |
| 12:00 | | Report | Oates 76' | Stadium: Edgeley Park; Attendance: 2,758; Referee: David Richardson |

| 20 June 2021 Final | Hartlepool United | 1–1 (5–4 p) | Torquay United | Bristol |
| 14:00 | Armstrong 35' | Report | Covolan 90' | Stadium: Ashton Gate; Attendance: 6,606; Referee: Simon Mather |
| | Penalties |
| | (penalty missed) Featherstone; (penalty missed) Armstrong; (penalty scored) Shelton; (penalty scored) Sterry; (penalty scored) Molyneux; (penalty scored) Elliott; (penalty scored) Donaldson | | Waters (penalty missed); Wright (penalty missed); Hall (penalty scored); Lewis (penalty scored); Little (penalty scored); Lemonheigh-Evans (penalty scored); Buse (penalty missed) |

=== FA Cup ===
| 24 October 2020 Fourth qualifying round | Ilkeston Town | 0–6 | Hartlepool United | Ilkeston |
| 15:00 | | Report | Molyneux 6'; Grey 8'; Crawford 23'; Bloomfield 68'; Parkhouse 82'; Holohan 90' | Stadium: New Manor Ground; Attendance: 400; Referee: David Richardson |

| 7 November 2020 First round | Salford City | 2–0 | Hartlepool United | Salford |
| 15:00 | Andrade 105'; Dieseruvwe 120' | Report | | Stadium: Moor Lane; Attendance: 0 Referee: Carl Boyeson |

=== FA Trophy ===
| 19 December 2020 Third round | FC Halifax Town | 3–3 (4–2 p) | Hartlepool United | Halifax |
| 15:00 | Summerfield 12' (pen.); Nepomuceno 14'; Chadwick 75' | Report | Williams 27' (pen.); Featherstone 74' (pen.); Holohan 78' | Stadium: The Shay; Attendance: 0 Referee: Steven Copeland |
| | Penalties |
| | Senior (penalty scored); Summerfield (penalty scored); Maher (penalty scored); Chadwick (penalty scored) | | Featherstone (penalty scored); Donaldson (penalty missed); Armstrong (penalty scored); Holohan (penalty missed) |

== Squad statistics ==
=== Appearances and goals ===
| No. | Pos | Nat | Player | Total | | National League | | FA Cup | | Other | |
| No. | Pos | Nat | Player | Apps | Goals | Apps | Goals | Apps | Goals | Apps | Goals |
|---|---|---|---|---|---|---|---|---|---|---|---|
| 1 | GK | (England) ENG | Ben Killip | 29 | 0 | 29 | 0 | 0 | 0 | 0 | 0 |
| 2 | DF | (England) ENG | Lewis Cass | 37 | 0 | 34 | 0 | 2 | 0 | 1 | 0 |
| 3 | DF | (England) ENG | David Ferguson | 44 | 1 | 39 | 1 | 2 | 0 | 3 | 0 |
| 4 | DF | (England) ENG | Gary Liddle | 27 | 0 | 23 | 0 | 1 | 0 | 3 | 0 |
| 5 | DF | (England) ENG | Timi Odusina | 32 | 0 | 28 | 0 | 1 | 0 | 3 | 0 |
| 6 | MF | (England) ENG | Mark Shelton | 39 | 3 | 36 | 3 | 0 | 0 | 3 | 0 |
| 7 | MF | (England) ENG | Ryan Donaldson | 30 | 0 | 25 | 0 | 1 | 0 | 4 | 0 |
| 8 | MF | (England) ENG | Nicky Featherstone | 43 | 5 | 37 | 4 | 2 | 0 | 4 | 1 |
| 9 | FW | (England) ENG | Mason Bloomfield | 24 | 3 | 22 | 2 | 2 | 1 | 0 | 0 |
| 10 | MF | (England) ENG | Luke Molyneux | 29 | 3 | 25 | 2 | 2 | 1 | 2 | 0 |
| 11 | FW | (England) ENG | Rhys Oates | 41 | 17 | 37 | 14 | 1 | 0 | 3 | 3 |
| 12 | FW | (England) ENG | Joe Grey | 15 | 2 | 13 | 1 | 1 | 1 | 1 | 0 |
| 13 | GK | (England) ENG | Brad James | 6 | 0 | 3 | 0 | 0 | 0 | 3 | 0 |
| 14 | MF | (Republic of Ireland) IRL | Gavan Holohan | 46 | 11 | 40 | 9 | 2 | 1 | 4 | 1 |
| 15 | DF | (England) ENG | Ryan Johnson | 39 | 5 | 33 | 5 | 2 | 0 | 4 | 0 |
| 16 | MF | (England) ENG | Claudio Ofosu | 12 | 1 | 11 | 1 | 1 | 0 | 0 | 0 |
| 17 | MF | (England) ENG | Josh MacDonald | 3 | 0 | 0 | 0 | 2 | 0 | 1 | 0 |
| 18 | MF | (England) ENG | Luke Williams | 9 | 1 | 8 | 0 | 0 | 0 | 1 | 1 |
| 19 | FW | (Northern Ireland) NIR | David Parkhouse | 9 | 2 | 6 | 1 | 2 | 1 | 1 | 0 |
| 19 | MF | (England) ENG | Tom White | 10 | 0 | 10 | 0 | 0 | 0 | 0 | 0 |
| 21 | GK | (Slovakia) SVK | Henrich Ravas | 13 | 0 | 10 | 0 | 2 | 0 | 1 | 0 |
| 22 | MF | (England) ENG | Tom Crawford | 20 | 1 | 17 | 0 | 2 | 1 | 1 | 0 |
| 23 | DF | (England) ENG | Jamie Sterry | 30 | 0 | 27 | 0 | 0 | 0 | 3 | 0 |
| 26 | DF | (Antigua and Barbuda) ANT | Zaine Francis-Angol | 6 | 0 | 4 | 0 | 0 | 0 | 2 | 0 |
| 27 | FW | (England) ENG | Danny Elliott | 7 | 1 | 5 | 1 | 0 | 0 | 2 | 0 |
| 28 | FW | (England) ENG | Harvey Saunders | 3 | 0 | 3 | 0 | 0 | 0 | 0 | 0 |
| 29 | FW | (England) ENG | Luke Armstrong | 32 | 15 | 28 | 13 | 0 | 0 | 4 | 2 |
| 33 | DF | (England) ENG | Jake Cooper | 2 | 0 | 2 | 0 | 0 | 0 | 0 | 0 |
| 38 | DF | (England) ENG | Tyler Magloire | 11 | 1 | 9 | 1 | 1 | 0 | 1 | 0 |
| 39 | DF | (England) ENG | Joe Bunney | 5 | 0 | 4 | 0 | 0 | 0 | 1 | 0 |
| 39 | FW | (England) ENG | Richie Bennett | 4 | 5 | 4 | 5 | 0 | 0 | 0 | 0 |

=== Goalscorers ===
| Rank | Name | National League | FA Cup | Other | Total |
|---|---|---|---|---|---|
| 1 | Rhys Oates | 14 | 0 | 3 | 17 |
| 2 | Luke Armstrong | 13 | 0 | 2 | 15 |
| 3 | Gavan Holohan | 9 | 1 | 1 | 11 |
| 4 | Richie Bennett | 5 | 0 | 0 | 5 |
| 4 | Nicky Featherstone | 4 | 0 | 1 | 5 |
| 4 | Ryan Johnson | 5 | 0 | 0 | 5 |
| 5 | Mason Bloomfield | 2 | 1 | 0 | 3 |
| 5 | Luke Molyneux | 2 | 1 | 0 | 3 |
| 5 | Mark Shelton | 3 | 0 | 0 | 3 |
| 6 | Joe Grey | 1 | 1 | 0 | 2 |
| 6 | David Parkhouse | 1 | 1 | 0 | 2 |
| 7 | Tom Crawford | 0 | 1 | 0 | 1 |
| 7 | Danny Elliott | 1 | 0 | 0 | 1 |
| 7 | David Ferguson | 1 | 0 | 0 | 1 |
| 7 | Tyler Magloire | 1 | 0 | 0 | 1 |
| 7 | Claudio Ofosu | 1 | 0 | 0 | 1 |
| 7 | Luke Williams | 0 | 0 | 1 | 1 |

=== Clean sheets ===
| Rank | Name | National League | FA Cup | Other | Total |
|---|---|---|---|---|---|
| 1 | Ben Killip | 13 | 0 | 0 | 13 |
| 2 | Henrich Ravas | 2 | 1 | 0 | 3 |
| 3 | Brad James | 1 | 0 | 1 | 2 |
