= Joe Grey =

English footballer (born 2003)

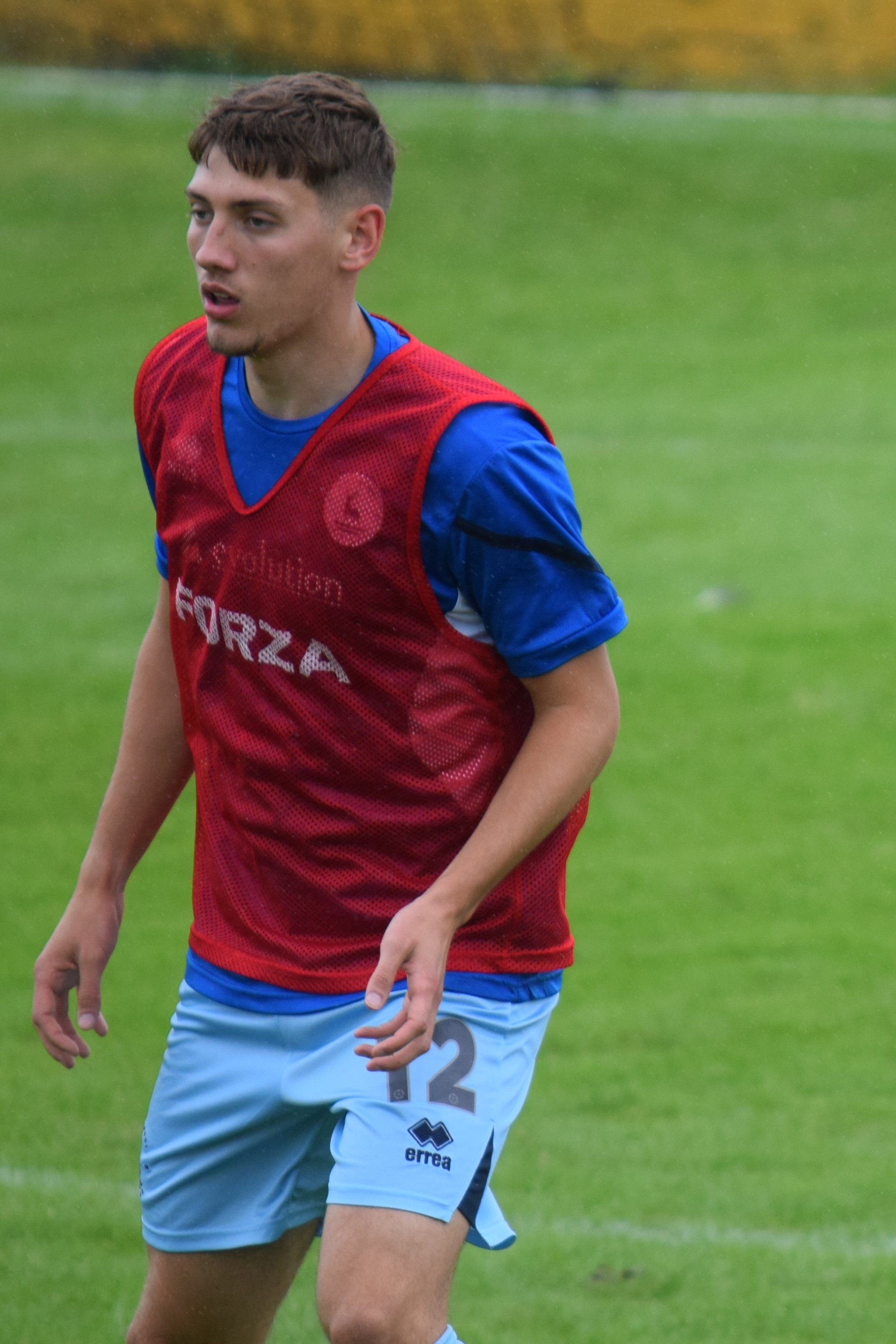
- Grey warming up for Hartlepool United in 2024

Personal information
- Full name: Joseph Grey
- Date of birth: 4 May 2003 (age 23)
- Place of birth: Newcastle upon Tyne, Tyne and Wear, England
- Height: 6 ft 0 in (1.82 m)
- Positions: Winger; striker

Team information
- Current team: York City
- Number: 7

Youth career
- 2011-2012: Corbridge United FC
- 2013–2019: Wallsend Boys Club
- 2019–2020: Cramlington Juniors

Senior career*
Years	Team	Apps	(Gls)
2020–2025	Hartlepool United	140	(21)
2025–	York City	50	(7)
- * Club domestic league appearances and goals as of 20:40, 26 September 2026 (UTC)

Joseph Grey (born 4 May 2003) is an English professional footballer who plays as a forward for EFL League Two club York City.

He started his youth career at Cramlington Juniors, before moving to Wallsend Boys Club and then on to Hartlepool United in 2019 where he signed his first professional deal the following year. He was part of the Hartlepool squad that gained promotion to League Two in the 2020–21 season. After making 162 appearances and scoring 25 times, Grey left Hartlepool to sign for National League club York City.

== Career ==
=== Hartlepool United ===
Born in Newcastle upon Tyne, Tyne and Wear, Grey signed for Hartlepool's youth team in 2019 and turned professional a year early due to interest from other clubs. On signing for the club Grey stated, "I'm over the moon to finally get this done, Hartlepool have been great to me and I was excited to be around the first team at different times last season and now during pre season. I want to continue working and get more opportunities when the season starts". He made his league debut in a 4–0 win over Maidenhead United. Grey got his first senior goal in a 6–0 thrashing of Northern Premier League team Ilkeston Town in the FA Cup fourth qualifying round. Grey's first league goal came in a 2–1 defeat to Eastleigh. He was part of the Hartlepool United squad that gained promotion to League Two in the 2020–21 season.

On 8 January 2022, Grey scored the winner in a 2–1 win over Championship team Blackpool as a substitute in the third round of the FA Cup. It was his first goal of the season. On 25 January 2022, Grey scored again as Hartlepool reached the semi-finals of the EFL Trophy after defeating Charlton Athletic on penalties. He also scored the opening goal against Rotherham United in the following round, however Hartlepool lost on penalties.

On 23 June 2022, Grey signed a new three-year deal with Hartlepool. He scored on his 100th Hartlepool appearance in a home defeat to Oldham Athletic in December 2023. He finished the 2023–24 season with 13 goals in total. In the 2024–25 season, he made 41 appearances in all competitions scoring 6 times. At the end of the campaign Grey was offered a new deal. However, he departed having made 162 appearances in total for Hartlepool, scoring 25 times.

=== York City ===
On 15 July 2025, it was announced that Grey had signed for National League club York City on a permanent deal with the fee to be set by a tribunal. In November 2025, Grey scored his first career hat-trick in a 5–1 win against Aldershot Town.

== Style of play ==
Grey can play as either a winger or as a striker. In his first season playing in the Football League, Grey predominately played as a winger. He has been praised for his work ethic, speed, and skill.

== Career statistics ==
As of match played 26 September 2026

Appearances and goals by club, season and competition
Club	Season	League			FA Cup		League Cup		Other		Total	
Club	Season	Division	Apps	Goals	Apps	Goals	Apps	Goals	Apps	Goals	Apps	Goals
Hartlepool United	2020–21	National League	13	1	1	1	0	0	1 (Note: Appearance(s) in FA Trophy)	0	15	2
Hartlepool United	2021–22	League Two	28	1	4	1	0	0	5 (Note: Appearances in EFL Trophy)	2	37	4
Hartlepool United	2022–23	League Two	17	0	4	0	0	0	2	0	23	0
Hartlepool United	2023–24	National League	43	13	1	0	0	0	2	0	46	13
Hartlepool United	2024–25	National League	39	6	2	0	0	0	0	0	41	6
Hartlepool United	Total		140	21	12	2	0	0	10	2	162	25
York City	2025–26	National League	42	6	1	0	0	0	1	0	44	6
York City	2026–27	League Two	8	1	0	0	1	0	0	0	9	1
York City	Total		50	7	1	0	0	0	1	0	53	7
Career total			182	27	13	2	0	0	11	2	206	31

== Honours ==
York City

- National League: 2025–26
