= Tom Crawford (English footballer) =

English footballer

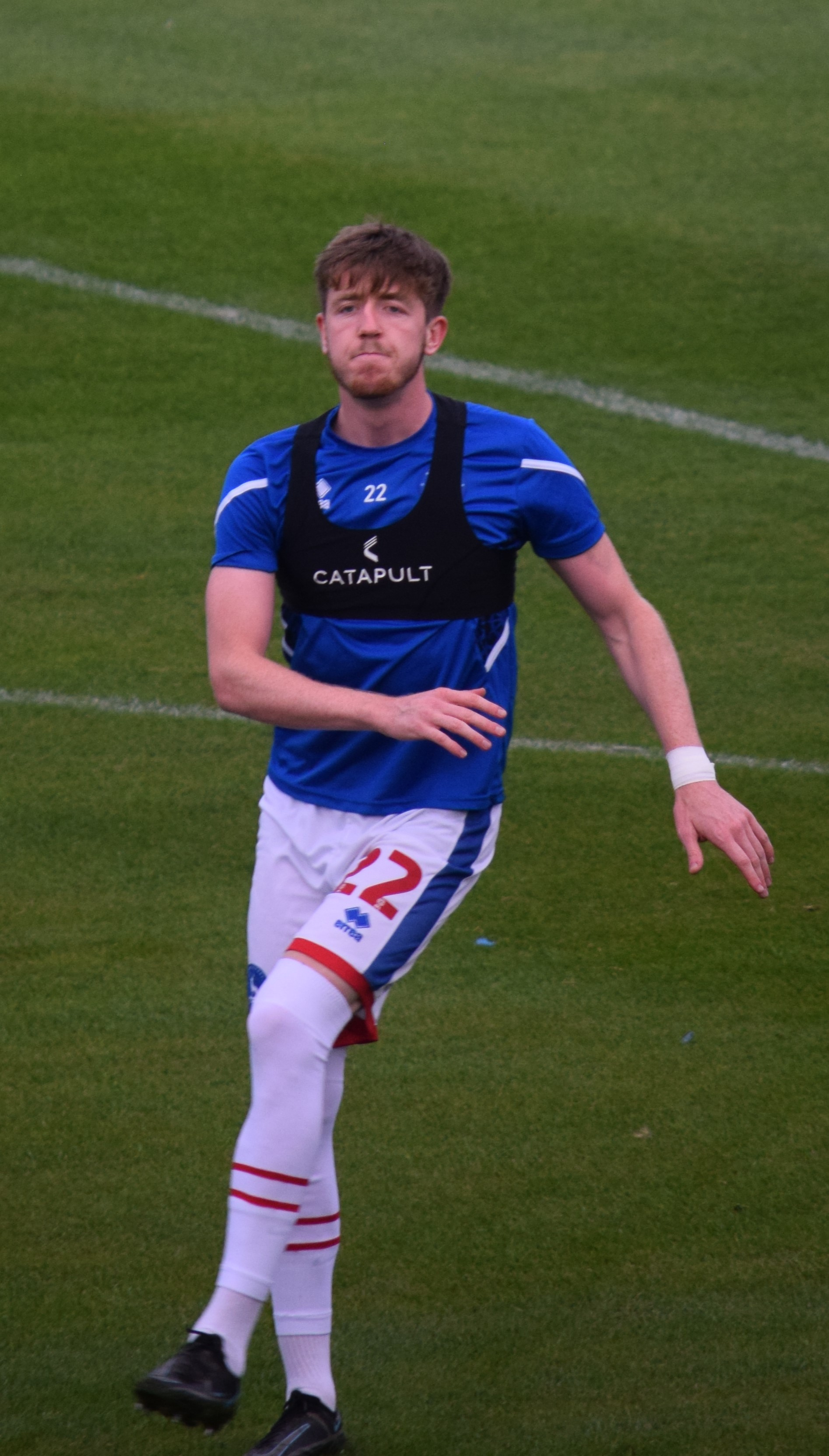
- Crawford warming up for Hartlepool United in 2022

Personal information
- Date of birth: 30 May 1999 (age 27)
- Place of birth: Chester, England
- Height: 6 ft 1 in (1.86 m)
- Position: Central midfielder

Team information
- Current team: Altrincham
- Number: 22

Youth career
- Stoke City
- 2014–2017: Chester

Senior career*
| Years | Team | Apps | (Gls) |
| 2017–2018 | Chester | 17 | (1) |
| 2017 | → Runcorn Town (loan) | 6 | (0) |
| 2017–2018 | → Leek Town (loan) | 5 | (0) |
| 2018–2020 | Notts County | 12 | (1) |
| 2019 | → AFC Fylde (loan) | 8 | (2) |
| 2020–2024 | Hartlepool United | 101 | (6) |
| 2024– | Altrincham | 86 | (7) |

International career
| 2018 | England C | 1 | (0) |
- * Club domestic league appearances and goals as of 00:09, 26 April 2026 (UTC)

Thomas Crawford (born 30 May 1999) is an English professional footballer who plays as a central midfielder for National League club Altrincham.

== Club career ==
=== Early career ===
Tom Crawford was born in Blacon and began his career with Stoke City, before being released at the age of 15. He then joined the Academy of Chester. He made his senior debut for Chester in the 2017–18 season. During the 2017–18 season he also spent loan spells at Runcorn Town and Leek Town.

After rejecting a new contract with Chester, he signed for Notts County in May 2018. He made his professional debut on 14 August 2018 in the EFL Cup against Middlesbrough, in which he scored his first goal for the club. He joined AFC Fylde on loan on 24 January 2019 until the end of the 2018–19 season. On 12 August 2019 the club announced that Crawford could go out on loan. He was released by the club at the end of the 2019–20 season.

=== Hartlepool United ===
On 24 August 2020, Crawford signed for National League side Hartlepool United, rejoining old AFC Fylde boss Dave Challinor. Early in Crawford's Hartlepool career he struggled with injury but he became a regular starter for the side during the 2021–22 season. On 19 February 2022, Crawford scored his first league goal for Hartlepool in a 1–1 draw at home to Sutton United. In April 2022, he signed a new two-year contract with Hartlepool. In November 2022, due to an ongoing ankle injury, Crawford underwent surgery which ruled him out until late in the 2022–23 campaign. In April 2023, Crawford returned from injury, coming on as an 85th minute substitute in a 2–1 win against Swindon Town. He made his 100th Hartlepool appearance in November 2023. In the 2023–24 season, Crawford received 12 yellow cards in 39 appearances. He was released by Hartlepool United at the end of the 2023–24 season having made 120 appearances during his four seasons with the club.

=== Altrincham ===
On 1 July 2024, Crawford joined National League side Altrincham. He scored his first goal for Altrincham in a 2–1 win over Dagenham & Redbridge on 24 September 2024.

In February 2026, Crawford was named as Altrincham's new club captain. Upon the appointment, Altrincham manager Neil Gibson said "He's one of the first names on the team sheet each week. He sets a good example in training, he's a good communicator and really tries to drive the standards within the group. He's been exceptional for us on the pitch in the time that we've been at the football club."

== International career ==
He made his debut for England C as a substitute in May 2018 against Republic of Ireland amateurs.

== Career statistics ==
As of 25 April 2026

Appearances and goals by club, season and competition
| Club | Season | League | | | FA Cup | | League Cup | | Other | | Total | |
| Club | Season | Division | Apps | Goals | Apps | Goals | Apps | Goals | Apps | Goals | Apps | Goals |
|---|---|---|---|---|---|---|---|---|---|---|---|---|
| Chester | 2017–18 | National League | 17 | 1 | 0 | 0 | 0 | 0 | 0 | 0 | 17 | 1 |
| Runcorn Town | 2017–18 | NWCFL Premier Division | 6 | 0 | 0 | 0 | 0 | 0 | 0 | 0 | 6 | 0 |
| Leek Town | 2017–18 | NPL Division One South | 5 | 0 | 0 | 0 | 0 | 0 | 0 | 0 | 5 | 0 |
| Notts County | 2018–19 | League Two | 4 | 0 | 0 | 0 | 1 | 1 | 1 (Note: Appearance(s) in EFL Trophy) | 0 | 6 | 1 |
| Notts County | 2019–20 | National League | 8 | 1 | 0 | 0 | 0 | 0 | 4 (Note: Appearance(s) in FA Trophy) | 1 | 12 | 2 |
| Notts County | Total | | 12 | 1 | 0 | 0 | 1 | 1 | 5 | 1 | 18 | 3 |
| AFC Fylde (loan) | 2018–19 | National League | 8 | 2 | 0 | 0 | 0 | 0 | 8 (Note: 6 appearances in the FA Trophy and 2 appearances in the National League play-offs) | 0 | 16 | 2 |
| Hartlepool United | 2020–21 | National League | 17 | 0 | 2 | 1 | 0 | 0 | 1 | 0 | 20 | 1 |
| Hartlepool United | 2021–22 | League Two | 28 | 1 | 3 | 0 | 0 | 0 | 7 | 0 | 38 | 1 |
| Hartlepool United | 2022–23 | League Two | 17 | 0 | 0 | 0 | 1 | 0 | 3 | 0 | 21 | 0 |
| Hartlepool United | 2023–24 | National League | 39 | 5 | 1 | 0 | 0 | 0 | 1 | 0 | 41 | 5 |
| Hartlepool United | Total | | 101 | 6 | 6 | 1 | 1 | 0 | 12 | 0 | 120 | 7 |
| Altrincham | 2024–25 | National League | 42 | 4 | 2 | 1 | 0 | 0 | 7 | 4 | 51 | 9 |
| Altrincham | 2025–26 | National League | 44 | 3 | 3 | 0 | 0 | 0 | 0 | 0 | 47 | 3 |
| Altrincham | Total | | 86 | 7 | 5 | 1 | 0 | 0 | 7 | 4 | 98 | 12 |
| Career total | | | 235 | 17 | 11 | 2 | 2 | 1 | 32 | 5 | 280 | 25 |

== Honours ==
AFC Fylde

- FA Trophy: 2018–19

Hartlepool United

- National League play-offs: 2021
