= Stewart Davies =

Stewart Davies was chairman of Darlington Football Club from 2004 to 2006.

Davies is an accountant with many years experience as senior partner in an insolvency practice. He, Melvyn Laughton and Sean Verity made up the Sterling Consortium, who offered high-interest loans to Football League clubs after the collapse of ITV Digital left many in financial difficulties and unable to obtain finance elsewhere. Recipients included Chesterfield, Barnsley, and Cambridge United.

In 2002, Darlington F.C. chairman George Reynolds borrowed from the consortium and from Davies personally in order to complete construction of the club's new stadium, the Darlington Arena. When Reynolds put the club into administration, Sterling took control of the club and Davies became chairman. He and his staff stabilized the club, both financially and in terms of its relationship with supporters before in March 2006 selling it to property tycoon George Houghton.
