= Eddy Jones =

Welsh footballer

Personal information
- Full name: Edward Thomas Jones
- Date of birth: 25 October 2001 (age 25)
- Place of birth: Chester, England
- Position: Left back

Team information
- Current team: Altrincham
- Number: 3

Youth career
- Bury
- 2020–2021: Stoke City

Senior career*
Years	Team	Apps	(Gls)
2020–2023	Stoke City	0	(0)
2020–2021	→ AFC Telford United (loan)	10	(0)
2021–2022	→ Hartlepool United (loan)	3	(0)
2022	→ Altrincham (loan)	13	(0)
2022–2023	→ Altrincham (loan)	19	(0)
2023–	Altrincham	99	(5)

International career^{‡}
- Wales U17
2021–	Wales U21	2	(0)
- * Club domestic league appearances and goals as of 00:05, 26 April 2026 (UTC) ‡ National team caps and goals as of 09:45, 1 September 2021 (UTC)

Edward Thomas Jones (born 25 October 2001) is a professional footballer who plays as a left back for National League club Altrincham. He is a former Wales under-21 international.

== Club career ==
Jones began his career with Stoke City having joined from Bury's academy. He spent part of the 2020–21 season on loan with AFC Telford United, where he made 12 appearances. Jones moved on loan to Hartlepool United in August 2021. He moved back to Stoke following the expiration of his loan deal in January 2022. Jones made six appearances in all competitions for Hartlepool United. On 4 February 2022, Jones joined National League side Altrincham on loan for the remainder of the 2021–22 season. Jones played 13 times for Altrincham as they finished in mid-table.

On 2 September 2022, Jones returned to Altrincham on a six-month loan along with Stoke teammate Dan Malone. On 10 January 2023, he joined Altrincham on a permanent deal.

== International career ==
Jones is a Wales youth international, playing for them at under-17 and under-21 levels.

== Career statistics ==
As of 25 April 2026

Appearances and goals by club, season and competition
Club	Season	League			FA Cup		League Cup		Other		Total	
Club	Season	Division	Apps	Goals	Apps	Goals	Apps	Goals	Apps	Goals	Apps	Goals
Stoke City	2020–21	Championship	0	0	0	0	0	0	—		0	0
Stoke City	2021–22	Championship	0	0	0	0	0	0	—		0	0
Stoke City	2022–23	Championship	0	0	0	0	0	0	—		0	0
Stoke City	Total		0	0	0	0	0	0	0	0	0	0
AFC Telford United (loan)	2020–21	National League North	10	0	0	0	—		2 (Note: Appearances in FA Trophy)	0	12	0
Hartlepool United (loan)	2021–22	League Two	3	0	0	0	0	0	3 (Note: Appearances in EFL Trophy)	0	6	0
Altrincham (loan)	2021–22	National League	13	0	0	0	—		0	0	13	0
Altrincham (loan)	2022–23	National League	19	0	2	0	—		1	0	22	0
Altrincham	2022–23	National League	21	2	0	0	—		5	0	26	2
Altrincham	2023–24	National League	42	2	1	0	—		2	0	45	2
Altrincham	2024–25	National League	14	1	1	0	—		3	0	18	1
Altrincham	2025–26	National League	22	0	0	0	—		0	0	22	0
Altrincham	Total		99	5	2	0	0	0	10	0	111	5
Career total			144	5	4	0	0	0	15	0	163	5
