= David Ferguson (footballer, born 1994) =

English footballer (born 1994)

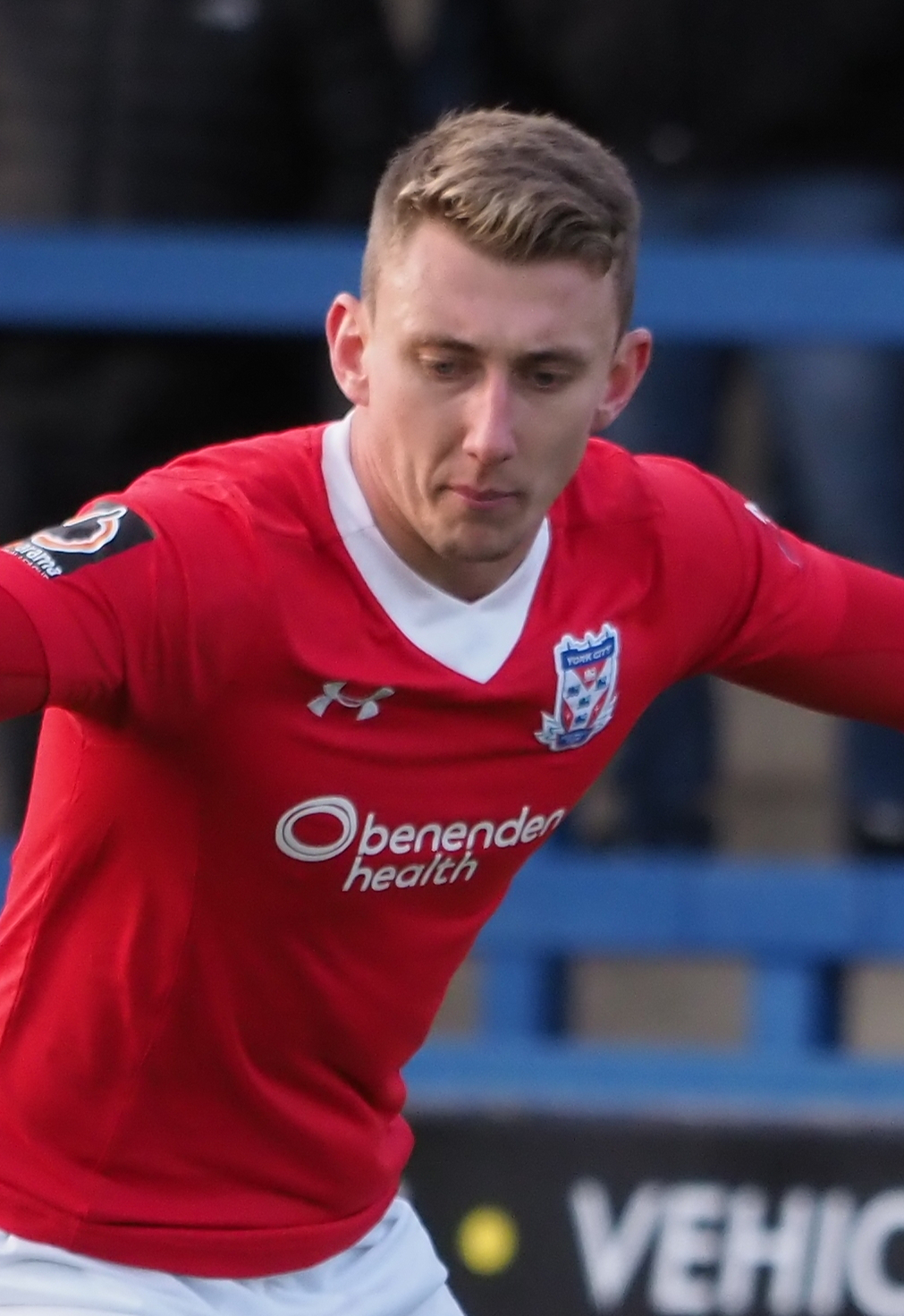
- Ferguson playing for York City in 2018

Personal information
- Full name: David Lee Ferguson
- Date of birth: 7 June 1994 (age 32)
- Place of birth: Sunderland, England
- Height: 5 ft 10 in (1.78 m)
- Position: Left-back

Team information
- Current team: Gateshead

Youth career
- –2012: Darlington

Senior career*
Years	Team	Apps	(Gls)
2012	Darlington	6	(0)
2012–2015	Sunderland	0	(0)
2014	→ Boston United (loan)	4	(0)
2015–2016	Blackpool	40	(1)
2016–2017	Shildon	25	(7)
2017	Darlington	30	(5)
2017–2020	York City	95	(3)
2020–2025	Hartlepool United	215	(11)
2025–	Gateshead	39	(0)

International career
2017	England C	3	(0)
- * Club domestic league appearances and goals as of 22:41, 17 May 2026 (UTC)

David Lee Ferguson (born 7 June 1994) is an English professional footballer who plays as a left-back for National League club Gateshead.

Born in Sunderland, Ferguson began his career with Darlington before signing for Sunderland in 2012. He left Sunderland in 2015 for Blackpool where he became club captain. After leaving Blackpool in 2016, Ferguson had spells in non-League with Shildon, Darlington and York City. In 2020, he signed for Hartlepool United where he earned promotion from the National League in his first season and was named in the division's Team of the Year.

== Early life ==
Ferguson was born in Sunderland, Tyne and Wear.

== Career ==
=== Darlington ===
Ferguson began his career in Darlington's youth system, breaking into the first team in early 2012. He finished the 2011–12 season with six Conference Premier appearances.

=== Sunderland ===
Ferguson signed for Premier League club Sunderland in June 2012 on a one-year contract. He went out on loan to Conference North club Boston United, making his debut on 1 March 2014 when starting a 4–0 home win over Hednesford Town.

=== Blackpool ===
Ferguson signed for Championship club Blackpool on 9 January 2015 on a one-and-a-half-year contract, with the option of a further year. He scored his first professional goal on 14 February 2015 in a 4–4 home draw with Nottingham Forest on 14 January 2015, in only his second appearance. The goal was a header from a Jamie O'Hara cross in the seventh minute of stoppage time, and was the final goal of the match. On 4 August 2015, Ferguson was appointed as team captain of Blackpool. He was released at the end of the 2015–16 season.

=== Shildon ===
He signed for Northern League Division One club Shildon in August 2016, but moved back to Darlington, now in the National League North, the following January. Ferguson played for England C for the first time in May 2017.

=== York City ===
On 6 October 2017, Ferguson signed for Darlington's National League North rivals York City on a contract running to June 2019, after York activated a release clause in his contract. He was signed by manager Martin Gray, who had left Darlington for York days earlier. Ferguson gave up a job in refuse upon returning to full-time football with York.

=== Hartlepool United ===
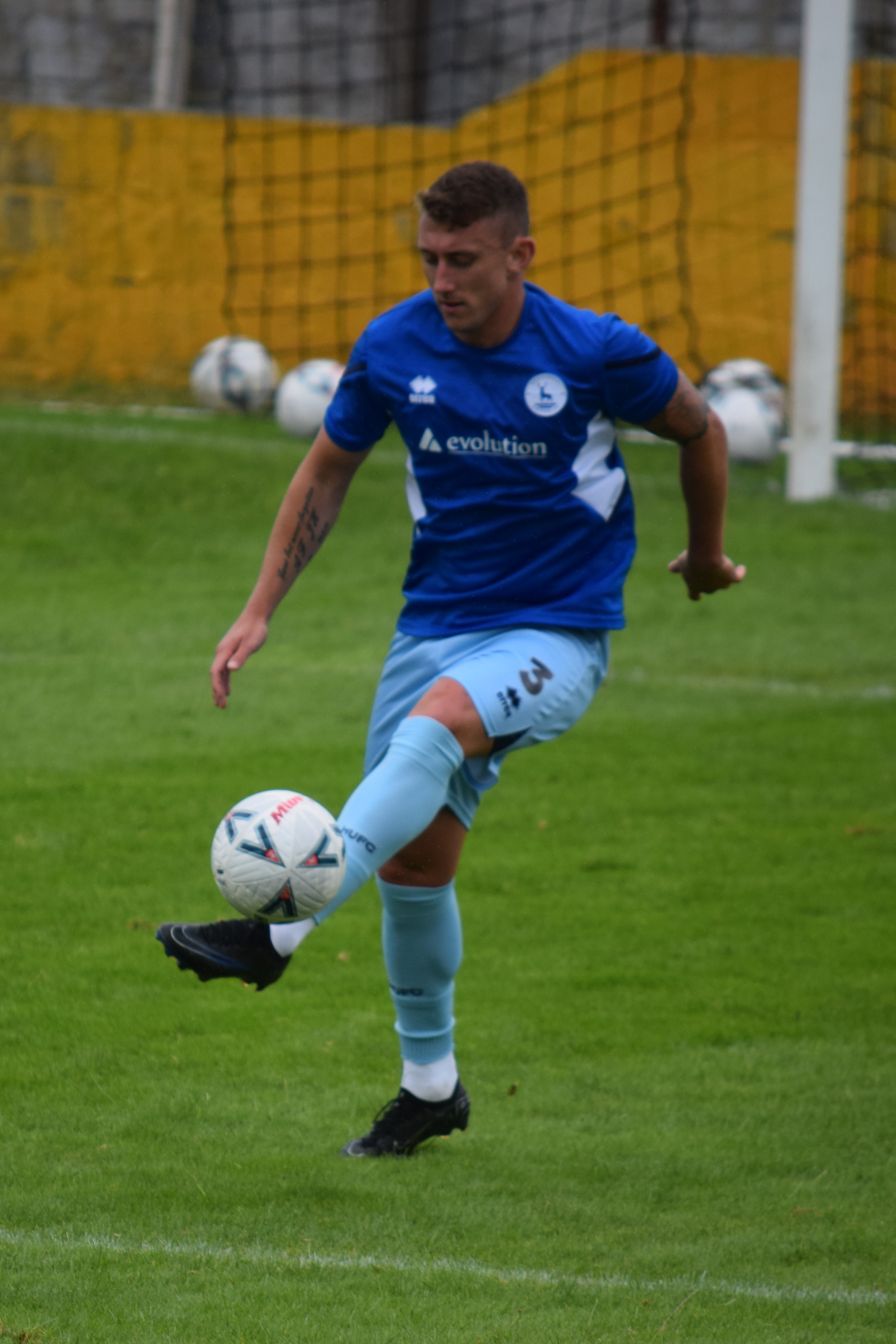
Ferguson warming up for Hartlepool United in 2024

Ferguson signed for National League club Hartlepool United on 5 August 2020 after turning down the offer of a new contract with York. He scored his first goal for Hartlepool with a free kick in a 2–0 home win against Solihull Moors. Ferguson started in the 2021 National League play-off final as Hartlepool were promoted back to the Football League. In his first season, Ferguson contributed 11 assists in total. His performances earned him a place in the National League Team of the Year.

In January 2022, Ferguson scored the equaliser against Championship side Blackpool in a 2–1 win as Hartlepool reached the fourth round of the FA Cup. On 6 May 2022, Ferguson signed a new two-year contract. Ahead of the 2023–24 season, Ferguson was named as Hartlepool's new captain. After a loss of form during the season, the captaincy reverted to Nicky Featherstone. At the end of the season, he was offered a new deal with the club. On 15 May 2024, he agreed a new deal with Hartlepool. On 7 September 2024, Ferguson made his 200th appearance for the club in a 0–0 home draw with FC Halifax Town. At the end of the 2024–25 season, Ferguson was offered a new contract at Hartlepool. However, he departed the club after contract discussions had "fizzled out".

=== Gateshead ===
On 25 June 2025, it was announced that Ferguson would become Alun Armstrong's first signing at National League club Gateshead.

At the start of the 2026–27 season, Ferguson was named as Gateshead's new club captain.

== Style of play ==
Ferguson is an attack-minded left back who is known for getting a high number of assists.

== Personal life ==
He attended St Aidan's Catholic Academy. While playing part-time for Shildon and Darlington, Ferguson worked for his local council in the refuse investigation department dealing with issues such as fly-tipping.

== Career statistics ==
As of match played 25 April 2026

Appearances and goals by club, season and competition
Club	Season	League			FA Cup		League Cup		Other		Total	
Club	Season	Division	Apps	Goals	Apps	Goals	Apps	Goals	Apps	Goals	Apps	Goals
Darlington	2011–12	Conference Premier	6	0	0	0	—		0	0	6	0
Sunderland	2012–13	Premier League	0	0	0	0	0	0	—		0	0
Sunderland	2013–14	Premier League	0	0	0	0	0	0	—		0	0
Sunderland	2014–15	Premier League	0	0	0	0	0	0	—		0	0
Sunderland	Total		0	0	0	0	0	0	—		0	0
Boston United (loan)	2013–14	Conference North	4	0	—		—		—		4	0
Blackpool	2014–15	Championship	10	1	—		—		—		10	1
Blackpool	2015–16	League One	30	0	0	0	1	0	1 (Note: Appearance in Football League Trophy)	0	32	0
Blackpool	Total		40	1	0	0	1	0	1	0	42	1
Shildon	2016–17	Northern League Division One	25	7	4	5	—		7 (Note: Four appearances and one goal in FA Vase, two appearances in Northern League Challenge Cup, one appearance in Durham Challenge Cup)	1	36	13
Darlington	2016–17	National League North	17	1	—		—		—		17	1
Darlington	2017–18	National League North	13	4	1	0	—		—		14	4
Darlington	Total		30	5	1	0	—		—		31	5
York City	2017–18	National League North	29	2	—		—		2 (Note: Appearance(s) in FA Trophy)	0	31	2
York City	2018–19	National League North	32	0	3	2	—		2	0	37	2
York City	2019–20	National League North	34	1	4	0	—		2 (Note: One appearance in FA Trophy, one in National League North play-offs)	0	40	1
York City	Total		95	3	7	2	—		6	0	108	5
Hartlepool United	2020–21	National League	39	1	2	0	—		3 (Note: Appearances in National League play-offs)	0	44	1
Hartlepool United	2021–22	League Two	42	4	5	1	1	0	4 (Note: Appearances in EFL Trophy)	0	52	5
Hartlepool United	2022–23	League Two	44	1	3	0	0	0	2	0	49	1
Hartlepool United	2023–24	National League	45	2	1	0	0	0	2	0	48	2
Hartlepool United	2024–25	National League	45	3	2	0	0	0	0	0	47	3
Hartlepool United	Total		215	11	13	1	1	0	11	0	240	12
Gateshead	2025–26	National League	39	0	3	1	0	0	4	0	46	1
Career total			454	27	28	9	2	0	28	1	512	37

== Honours ==
Hartlepool United

- National League play-offs: 2021

Individual

- National League Team of the Year: 2020–21
