= Timi Odusina =

English footballer

Personal information
- Full name: Oluwarotimi Mark Odusina
- Date of birth: 28 October 1999 (age 27)
- Place of birth: Croydon, England
- Position: Defender

Team information
- Current team: Woking
- Number: 5

Youth career
- Norwich City

Senior career*
Years	Team	Apps	(Gls)
2016–2020	Norwich City	0	(0)
2019	→ AFC Fylde (loan)	8	(0)
2020	→ Hartlepool United (loan)	8	(0)
2020–2022	Hartlepool United	59	(0)
2022–2024	Bradford City	4	(0)
2023–2024	→ Woking (loan)	17	(0)
2024–	Woking	65	(0)
- * Club domestic league appearances and goals as of 19:28, 11 October 2026 (UTC)

Oluwarotimi "Timi" Odusina (born 28 October 1999) is an English professional footballer who plays as a defender for National League club Woking.

== Career ==
Odusina signed his first professional contract with Norwich City in 2016.

In January 2019, Odusina signed on loan with National League side AFC Fylde. Odusina made eight league appearances for the club and was a part of the side that won the 2018–19 FA Trophy after beating Leyton Orient 1–0 at Wembley Stadium.

The following season, Odusina moved on loan to fellow National League side Hartlepool United. After impressing on his loan deal, Odusina signed permanently with the North-East side at the start of the 2020–21 season where he won promotion in his first full season with the club.

Odusina made his first appearance in the Football League in August 2021 for Hartlepool in 1–0 win against Crawley Town. At the end of his first season playing in the Football League, Odusina picked up Hartlepool United's Young Player of the Year award.

In June 2022, Odusina rejected a new contract at Hartlepool and signed for fellow League Two club Bradford City. On 15 September 2023, he joined National League side Woking on loan, initially until January 2024. The move was made permanent in May 2024.

== Personal life ==
Born in England, Odusina is of Nigerian descent.

== Career statistics ==
As of match played 10 November 2026

Appearances and goals by club, season and competition
Club	Season	League			FA Cup		League Cup		Other		Total	
Club	Season	Division	Apps	Goals	Apps	Goals	Apps	Goals	Apps	Goals	Apps	Goals
Norwich City U23	2016–17	—			—		—		1 (Note: Appearance(s) in EFL Trophy)	0	1	0
AFC Fylde (loan)	2018–19	National League	8	0	0	0	—		6	0	14	0
Hartlepool United	2019–20	National League	8	0	0	0	—		0	0	8	0
Hartlepool United	2020–21	National League	28	0	1	0	—		3 (Note: Appearances in National League play-offs)	0	32	0
Hartlepool United	2021–22	League Two	31	0	4	0	1	0	7	0	43	0
Hartlepool United	Total		67	0	5	0	1	0	10	0	83	0
Bradford City	2022–23	League Two	4	0	0	0	0	0	3	0	7	0
Bradford City	2023–24	League Two	0	0	0	0	0	0	0	0	0	0
Bradford City	Total		4	0	0	0	0	0	3	0	7	0
Woking (loan)	2023–24	National League	17	0	1	0	—		1 (Note: Appearance(s) in FA Trophy)	0	19	0
Woking	2024–25	National League	21	0	1	0	—		3	0	25	0
Woking	2025–26	National League	32	0	1	0	—		4 (Note: Three appearances in National League Cup, One appearance in FA Trophy)	0	37	0
Woking	2026–27	National League	12	0	0	0	—		3 (Note: 2 Appearance(s) in National League Cup}, 1 Appearance in Surrey Senior Cup)	0	15	0
Woking	Total		65	0	2	0	—		10	0	77	0
Career total			161	0	8	0	1	0	31	0	201	0

== Honours ==
AFC Fylde

- FA Trophy: 2018–19

Hartlepool United

- National League play-offs: 2021

Individual

- Hartlepool United Young Player of the Year: 2021–22
