= Matty Daly =

English footballer (born 2001)

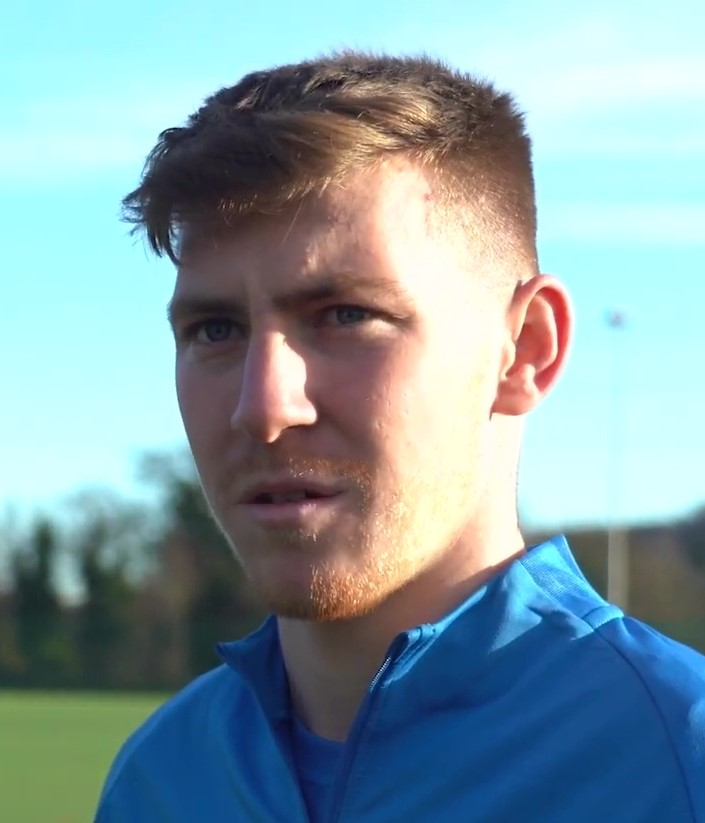
- Daly in 2022

Personal information
- Full name: Matthew Paul Daly
- Date of birth: 10 March 2001 (age 25)
- Place of birth: Stockport, England
- Position: Attacking midfielder

Team information
- Current team: Morecambe

Youth career
- Oldham Athletic
- –2015: Everton
- 2015–2018: Huddersfield Town

Senior career*
Years	Team	Apps	(Gls)
2018–2023	Huddersfield Town	12	(1)
2021–2022	→ Hartlepool United (loan)	19	(2)
2022	→ Bradford City (loan)	9	(1)
2022–2023	→ Harrogate Town (loan)	35	(7)
2023–2025	Harrogate Town	55	(7)
2025–2026	Hartlepool United	43	(4)
2026–	Morecambe	11	(4)

International career^{‡}
2017–2018	England U17	10	(1)
2019–2020	England U18	5	(0)
- * Club domestic league appearances and goals as of 18:16, 11 October 2026 (UTC) ‡ National team caps and goals as of 08:03, 28 June 2022 (UTC)

Matthew Paul Daly (born 10 March 2001) is an English professional footballer who plays as an attacking midfielder for National League North side Morecambe.

Daly began his senior career with Huddersfield, becoming their youngest Premier League player at age 18 in 2019. After struggling to break into the first team, he was loaned to Hartlepool United in August 2021. He had a successful loan with them, but was recalled in January 2022. Later that month, he went back out on loan, this time to Bradford City. His loan was cut short by injury however. He was then loaned to Harrogate Town in August 2022. He had a productive loan with them, but was released by Huddersfield at the end of the 2022–23 season. Harrogate then signed him as a free agent in May 2023.

== Early life ==
Daly was born in Stockport, and attended Reddish Vale Technology College. He began with Oldham Athletic at the age of eight. He later joined the Everton of Everton at the under-11 level. He signed a new deal with Everton in 2014, and was also named as under-13 Player of the Year. He signed for Huddersfield Town in September 2015.

== Club career ==
=== Huddersfield Town ===
Daly signed a two-year scholarship with Huddersfield in April 2017. After impressing in pre-season with the first-team, he signed his first professional contract in July 2018, a three-year deal with an option to extend for a further year. He made his first team debut for the Terriers as a first-half substitute for Jonathan Hogg in their 2–1 defeat to Watford in the Premier League on 20 April 2019. He was 18 years, 1 month and 10 days old during the appearance, making him the youngest Huddersfield player to play in the Premier League. Daly finished the season with 2 appearances, as Huddersfield were relegated to the Championship.

On 10 December, Daly scored his first senior goal against Charlton Athletic in his fifth appearance for Huddersfield, an injury time winner to win the match 1–0. After the match, manager Danny Cowley stated he thought Daly could "press for a place in the first eleven". In August 2020, he extended his contract by two years with an additional one-year option. He received his first start later that year on 1 December, in a 3–0 defeat to Cardiff City. Daly struggled for gametime under Carlos Corberán, as there was midfield competition. Ahead of the 2021–22 season, he looked to go out on loan, with only 12 appearances in total for Huddersfield. He went on trial with recently relegated League One club Rotherham United, but nothing came of it.

==== Loans to Hartlepool United and Bradford City ====
On 5 August 2021, Daly signed for newly promoted League Two side Hartlepool United for the first loan move of his career. He made his debut for Hartlepool as a late substitute in a 1–0 victory against Crawley Town on 7 August. He scored his first goal on 31 August in an EFL Trophy match against Carlisle United. He scored his first league goal on 23 October in a 3–2 win over Harrogate Town. Daly became an important player at Hartlepool, with interim manager Anthony Sweeney stating, "He's growing into a key player for us. He's got real ability and can affect games." Huddersfield recalled Daly on 17 January 2022, supposedly due to injury problems. However, it was later revealed that Huddersfield had recalled him due to playtime concerns under new manager Graeme Lee. Daly made 27 appearances and scored seven goals in total for Hartlepool, including five goals in four appearances in the EFL Trophy.

On 18 January 2022, the day after being recalled from Hartlepool United, Daly returned to League Two to join Bradford City on loan until the end of the season. He made his debut on 22 January, starting in a 0–0 draw against Rochdale. He scored his first goal for The Bantams on 25 January in a 2–1 win over Walsall. He suffered a foot injury which led to him being recalled by Huddersfield for surgery. He finished his loan with 1 goal in 9 appearances.

==== 2022–23 season: Loan to Harrogate Town ====
"I think he will get people off their seats this season, if we get him in the right areas where he can be as creative as he wants and a real goalscoring threat then he will excite the Harrogate fans, I've no doubt about that."

— Harrogate manager Simon Weaver on Daly's loan.

On 27 June 2022, Daly joined Harrogate Town on loan for the whole of the 2022–23 season. He scored on his debut on 30 July 2022, a 3–0 win over Swindon Town on opening day. On 5 November, he scored in a 1–0 win over former club Bradford in the FA Cup, his fourth consecutive goal. Later that month on 19 November, in a 3–0 win over Manfield Town, he came off shortly after half-time after injuring his knee. Following a scan, it was revealed that he would be out for eight weeks. He made his return on 28 January, in a 1–0 defeat to Sutton United. He finished his loan with 8 goals in 39 appearances. He also helped Harrogate avoid relegation.

=== Harrogate Town ===
Daly was released by Huddersfield in 2023. Due to his successful loan, he began negotiations to return to Harrogate. Daly agreed to return to Harrogate on a two-year deal in May to become Harrogate's first summer signing. He made his first appearance on his return on opening day, in a 1–0 victory against Doncaster Rovers on 5 August. He scored his first goal of the season on 16 September in a 1–1 draw to former team Bradford. He maintained his place as a first team regular, making 46 appearances and scoring 6 times that season.

After a hamstring injury kept him out for six weeks, Daly made his return on 14 October in a 1–0 win over Newport County. Manager Simon Weaver said Daly's return made Harrogate "a better team". He would then suffer a toe injury however, which kept him out from November until returning on 3 December, in a 2–0 defeat to Salford City.

On 8 May 2025, the club announced the player would be released in June when his contract expired.

=== Hartlepool United ===
On 25 July 2025, Daly returned to National League side Hartlepool United on a permanent deal, four years after his loan spell at the club. His first goal during his second spell came on 25 October with a stoppage time goal in a 2–0 home win against Solihull Moors. In total, Daly made 43 league appearances, scoring four times. On 6 May 2026, the club announced he was being released.

=== Morecambe ===
On 13 June 2026, it was announced that Daly would sign for newly-relegated National League North club Morecambe on a two-year deal, with the club having the option of a further year.

== International career ==
He has represented England at international youth levels, including under-17, where he received 10 caps including his participation at the 2018 UEFA European Under-17 Championship. This included scoring the winning goal in the 2–1 win over Israel under-17s in their first match. He then played in a semi-final defeat to the Netherlands under-17s on a penalty shootout, although Daly did score England's second penalty. In May 2019, Daly was part of the England U18s squad that competed at the Slovakia Cup.

== Style of play ==
Daly has been described as "a creative player and probably at his best playing in the final third. Quite an attacking midfielder who likes a dribble and a pass."

== Career statistics ==
As of 10 October 2026

Appearances and goals by club, season and competition
Club	Season	League			FA Cup		League Cup		Other		Total	
Club	Season	Division	Apps	Goals	Apps	Goals	Apps	Goals	Apps	Goals	Apps	Goals
Huddersfield Town	2018–19	Premier League	2	0	0	0	0	0	0	0	2	0
Huddersfield Town	2019–20	Championship	4	1	0	0	0	0	0	0	4	1
Huddersfield Town	2020–21	Championship	5	0	1	0	0	0	0	0	6	0
Huddersfield Town	Total		11	1	1	0	0	0	0	0	12	1
Hartlepool United (loan)	2021–22	League Two	19	2	3	0	1	0	4 (Note: Appearance(s) in EFL Trophy)	5	27	7
Bradford City (loan)	2021–22	League Two	9	1	0	0	0	0	0	0	9	1
Harrogate Town (loan)	2022–23	League Two	35	7	1	1	1	0	2	0	39	8
Harrogate Town	2023–24	League Two	40	6	2	0	2	0	2	0	46	6
Harrogate Town	2024–25	League Two	15	1	0	0	2	0	0	0	17	1
Harrogate Town	Total		55	7	2	0	4	0	2	0	63	7
Hartlepool United	2025–26	National League	43	4	1	0	0	0	1	0	45	4
Morecambe	2026–27	National League North	11	4	2	1	0	0	0	0	13	5
Career total			183	26	10	2	7	0	9	5	208	33
