= George Houghton (businessman) =

George Houghton is a former property tycoon who was the chairman of Darlington Football Club. He became chairman in March 2006 following Stewart Davies. In 2006, Houghton traveled to Poland for talks to establish feeder clubs. In 2010, Houghton stated his intention to step down as chairman in two years' time. Houghton appointed the first ever vice chairman at the club on 2 December 2008, Raj Singh.

Houghton left the club in February 2009. On 20 May 2009, it was announced that he was returning to Darlington as chairman and has appointed former Middlesbrough boss Colin Todd as manager. On 1 June 2009, it was announced that former vice president Raj Singh was taking over the club as chairman.
