= Luke Molyneux =

English footballer (born 1998)

Personal information
- Full name: Luke James Molyneux
- Date of birth: 29 March 1998 (age 28)
- Place of birth: Bishop Auckland, England
- Height: 5 ft 11 in (1.80 m)
- Positions: Right winger; right midfielder

Team information
- Current team: Salford City

Youth career
- 2014–2018: Sunderland

Senior career*
Years	Team	Apps	(Gls)
2018–2019	Sunderland	3	(0)
2018–2019	→ Gateshead (loan)	15	(2)
2019	→ Hartlepool United (loan)	16	(2)
2019–2022	Hartlepool United	78	(11)
2022–2026	Doncaster Rovers	170	(36)
2026–	Salford City	10	(1)
- * Club domestic league appearances and goals as of 18 October 2026

Luke Molyneux (born 29 March 1998) is an English professional footballer who plays as a right winger for EFL League Two club Salford City.

== Career ==
=== Sunderland ===
Molyneux came through the ranks with Sunderland and played his first professional games for the under-23 squad in the 2016–17 EFL Trophy. He later went on to make his first-team debut in a 3–0 victory over Wolverhampton Wanderers on 6 May 2018.

==== Loan to Gateshead ====
After a handful of substitute appearances early in the 2018–19 season, Molyneux went on a half-season loan to National League side Gateshead. Molyneux scored his first career goal in a 4–0 victory over Dunston UTS on 20 October 2018 in the fourth qualifying round of the FA Cup. He later went on to score his first league goals against Maidstone United on 22 December 2018, netting two goals in a 3–2 win. Molyneux made 18 appearances for Gateshead during his loan spell, scoring three goals.

==== Loan to Hartlepool United ====
Following his return to Sunderland, Molyneux went on a further loan to another local National League side Hartlepool United on 18 January 2019. Molyneux made 16 appearances for Hartlepool during his loan spell, scoring the winning goals in victories over Dover Athletic and FC Halifax Town.

=== Hartlepool United ===
Following his release by Sunderland, Molyneux signed permanently for Hartlepool permanently on 12 June 2019. Unfortunately for Molyneux, his first full season with the club was cut short after suffering an ankle injury during a pre-season friendly at York City. On 1 January 2020, Molyneux made his return from injury as a late substitute in a 1–0 defeat against Harrogate Town. On 8 February 2020, Molyneux made his first start of 2019–20 season as he scored and assisted in Hartlepool's 2–0 victory over Aldershot Town.

In October 2020, Molyneux contracted COVID-19, forcing him to miss the opening fixtures of the 2020–21 season. In the 2021 National League play-off final, Molyneux was a late substitute in extra time against Torquay United. In the resulting penalty shoot-out, he scored Hartlepool's fifth penalty as Hartlepool were promoted back to League Two.

On 20 July 2021, Molyneux signed a contract extension with Hartlepool. On 25 September 2021, Molyneux scored his first Football League goal in a 1–1 draw with Exeter City. On 25 January 2022, Molyneux scored the equaliser against Charlton Athletic three minutes after coming off the bench as Hartlepool progressed to the semi-finals of the EFL Trophy. He also scored in the resulting penalty shoot-out. This performance earned him player of the round for the quarter-finals.

Molyneux picked up three awards at Hartlepool's 2021–22 Awards ceremony. He won the Players' and Fans' Player of the Year Award, along with the Goal of the Season Award for his long range strike in a 2–1 win against Harrogate Town. On 21 June 2022, it was announced that Molyneux had turned down the offer of a new contract and would be leaving the club. He left for Doncaster Rovers.

=== Doncaster Rovers ===
On 21 June 2022, the same day as his impending departure from Hartlepool was announced, Molyneux agreed to join recently relegated League Two club Doncaster Rovers on a two-year deal. Molyneux later revealed that he had been in talks with League One sides Milton Keynes Dons and Bristol Rovers in the weeks prior to him joining Doncaster. In February 2023, Molyneux scored a brace in a 2–0 victory at Swindon Town, his first goals for the club.

In the 2023–24 season, following his first year at the club. Doncaster finished fifth in League Two, securing a play-off place but ultimately falling short of promotion. The team scored 73 goals across the league campaign, with Molyneux scoring 11 goals in all competitions. On 28 May 2024, the club announced he had signed a new three-year deal, extending his stay at the club until the summer of 2027. The deal followed interest from other clubs but Molyneux opted to commit his future to the Rovers, emphasising his desire to help the club achieve promotion

Molyneux started the 2024–25 season with a brace in a 4–1 league victory over Accrington Stanley on the opening day of the League Two campaign. Following a strong start to the 2024–25 season, Molyneux was named EFL League Two Player of the Month for August 2024 having scored four goals and contributed two assists.

On 28 September 2024, Molyneux picked up the second red card of his career after he received two yellow cards in Doncaster's 3–0 defeat to Chesterfield. However he quickly made amends as on his return from his one-game suspension, Molyneux scored and picked up an assist in his side's 3–0 away win at Grimsby Town.

On 12 January 2025 during the FA Cup third round tie against Hull City at the MKM Stadium, Molyneux scored shortly after half-time to give Doncaster the lead against Championship club. The match finished 1–1 after extra time, and Doncaster progressed to the fourth round by winning 5–4 on penalties, with Molyneux also converting in the shoot-out.

On 1 April 2025, Molyneux made his 150th appearance for Doncaster Rovers and scored his 50th goal for the club. On 18 April 2025, he scored a first career hat-trick as his side defeated Tranmere Rovers 3–0 to move into second position with just three matches remaining. Following their title win, Molyneux was named as the side's Player of the Season, also winning the Players' Player of the Year, Supporters' Player of the Year and Goal of the Season awards, in addition to the Golden Boot after scoring 16 times in 45 league appearances. He was included in the League Two Team of the Season and was nominated for the League Two Player of the Season award.

On 21 February 2026, Molyneux scored the winning goal in a 2–1 win against South Yorkshire rivals Rotherham United at the New York Stadium, after chasing down the Rotherham goalkeeper outside his penalty area, forcing a crucial error and firing the ball into the empty net. In July 2026, manager Grant McCann confirmed that Molyneux had not entered negotiations regarding a new contract, and the club had subsequently rejected a bid for him.

=== Salford City ===
On 28 July 2026, Molyneux was signed by Salford City for an undisclosed fee.

== Style of play ==
Molyneux has been described as a versatile performer who is comfortable on either flank or even in a more central position, and is known for his direct style, pace and trickery. In September 2024, Doncaster manager Grant McCann said of Luke: "He has all the attributes we like in his play – his ability to beat people, get at them, create and score, as well as being a great person who wants to learn and get better."

== Career statistics ==
As of matches played 26 September 2026

Appearances and goals by club, season and competition
Club	Season	League			FA Cup		EFL Cup		Other		Total	
Club	Season	Division	Apps	Goals	Apps	Goals	Apps	Goals	Apps	Goals	Apps	Goals
Sunderland	2016–17	Premier League	0	0	0	0	0	0	4 (Note: Appearance(s) in EFL Trophy)	0	4	0
Sunderland	2017–18	Championship	1	0	0	0	0	0	3	0	4	0
Sunderland	2018–19	League One	2	0	0	0	1	0	2	0	5	0
Sunderland	Total		3	0	0	0	1	0	9	0	13	0
Gateshead (loan)	2018–19	National League	15	2	2	1	0	0	1 (Note: Appearance(s) in FA Trophy)	0	18	3
Hartlepool United	2018–19	National League	16	2	0	0	0	0	0	0	16	2
Hartlepool United	2019–20	National League	10	1	1	0	0	0	0	0	11	1
Hartlepool United	2020–21	National League	25	2	2	1	0	0	2 (Note: Appearance(s) in National League play-offs)	0	29	3
Hartlepool United	2021–22	League Two	43	8	5	1	1	0	6	3	55	12
Hartlepool United	Total		94	13	8	2	1	0	8	3	111	18
Doncaster Rovers	2022–23	League Two	40	3	1	0	0	0	3	0	44	3
Doncaster Rovers	2023–24	League Two	45	10	3	0	2	0	8	2	58	11
Doncaster Rovers	2024–25	League Two	45	16	4	1	2	1	4	0	55	18
Doncaster Rovers	2025–26	League One	40	8	3	0	3	0	6	0	52	8
Doncaster Rovers	Total		170	36	11	1	7	1	21	2	209	40
Salford City	2026–27	League Two	7	1	0	0	1	0	0	0	8	1
Career total			289	52	21	4	10	1	39	5	359	62

== Honours ==
Hartlepool United

- National League play-offs: 2021

Doncaster Rovers

- EFL League Two: 2024–25

Individual

- Hartlepool United Players' Player of the Year: 2021–22
- Hartlepool United Fans' Player of the Year: 2021–22
- EFL League Two Player of the Month: August 2024
- Doncaster Rovers Player of the Year: 2024–25
- EFL League Two Team of the Season: 2024–25
- PFA Team of the Year: 2024–25 League Two
