= Ben Killip =

English footballer

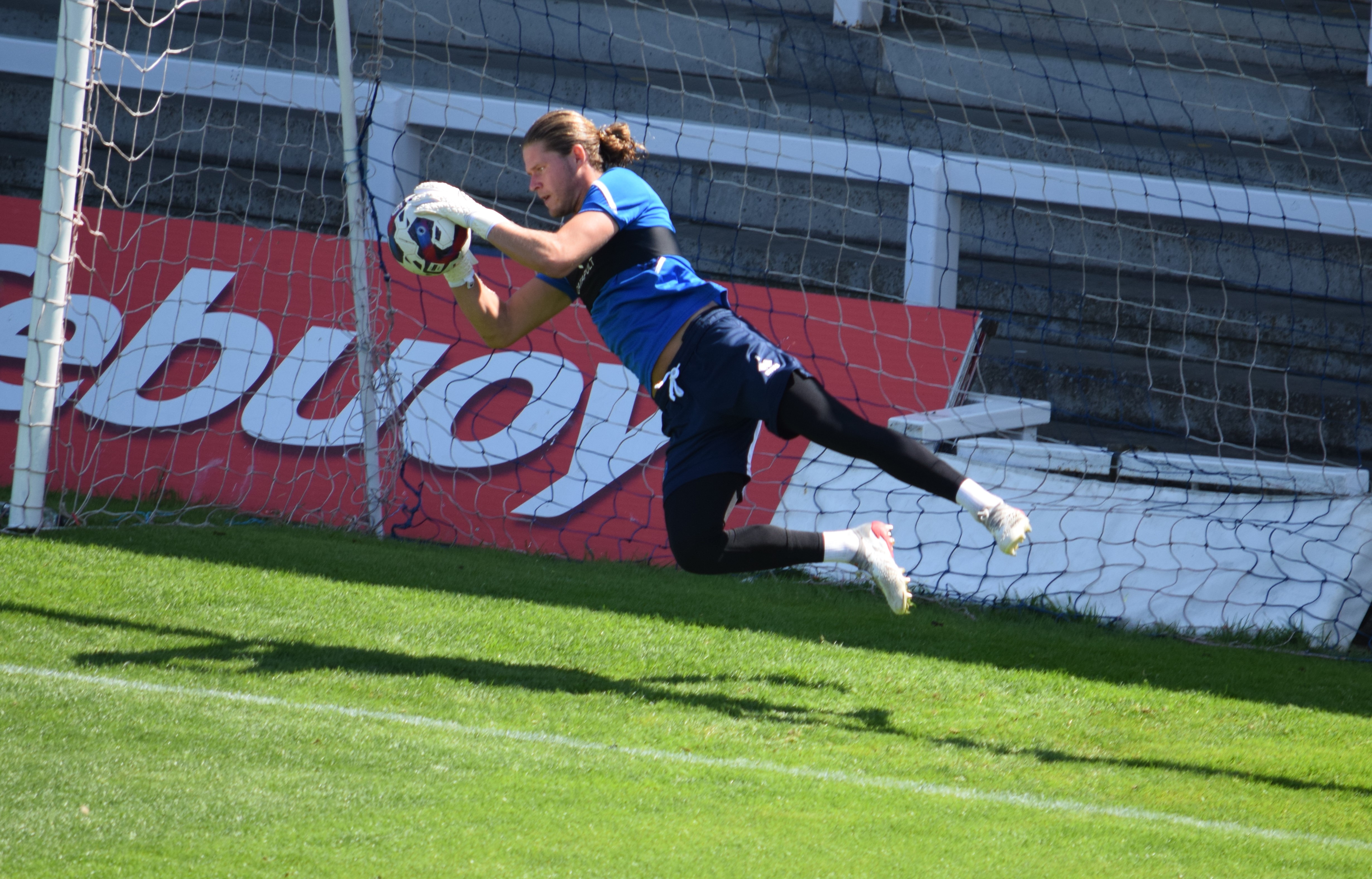
- Killip warming up for Hartlepool United in 2022

Personal information
- Full name: Ben Killip
- Date of birth: 24 November 1995 (age 30)
- Place of birth: Isleworth, England
- Height: 6 ft 2 in (1.88 m)
- Position: Goalkeeper

Team information
- Current team: Portsmouth
- Number: 30

Youth career
- 2003–2013: Chelsea
- 2013–2015: Norwich City

Senior career*
Years	Team	Apps	(Gls)
2015–2017	Norwich City	0	(0)
2015	→ King's Lynn Town (loan)	1	(0)
2015–2016	→ Lowestoft Town (loan)	9	(0)
2016	→ Lowestoft Town (loan)	14	(0)
2017–2018	Grimsby Town	7	(0)
2018–2019	Braintree Town	38	(0)
2019–2023	Hartlepool United	133	(0)
2023–2025	Barnsley	25	(0)
2025–	Portsmouth	6	(0)

International career^{‡}
2018–2019	England C	3	(0)
- * Club domestic league appearances and goals as of 13:20, 2 May 2026 (UTC) ‡ National team caps and goals as of 20:28, 8 June 2019 (UTC)

Ben Killip (born 24 November 1995) is an English professional footballer who plays as a goalkeeper for Portsmouth.

== Career ==
=== Early career ===
Whilst playing for Norwich City, Killip spent two loan spells at Lowestoft Town. He signed for Grimsby Town in July 2017. He was released by Grimsby at the end of the 2017–18 season.

Killip signed for National League side Braintree Town on 31 July 2018.

=== Hartlepool United ===
He moved to Hartlepool United in May 2019. In the 2019–20 season, Killip struggled for form after making several mistakes and lost the number one spot to Mitchell Beeney, however he soon regained his place in the team. The next season, Killip had a much more successful campaign managing to keep 13 clean sheets in 29 matches. On 5 April 2021, in a 2–2 draw with Boreham Wood, Killip injured his elbow and was ruled out for the rest of the 2020–21 season. Killip did, however, make the substitutes bench for the play-offs as the club won promotion to League Two in June 2021.

He signed a new contract for Hartlepool at the end of the 2020–21 season. In August 2021, Killip kept a clean sheet in Hartlepool's first game back in the Football League as Hartlepool beat Crawley Town 1–0. Killip's performance in the EFL Trophy semi-final against Rotherham United earned him player of the round. Hartlepool eventually lost 5–4 on penalties with Killip saving one penalty in the shootout.

On 11 May 2022, Killip's contract option was exercised, keeping him at the club until the end of the 2022–23 season. Killip received some criticism for his form during the middle of the 2022–23 season, most notably after an error in a 1–0 defeat to Stevenage when he was getting ready to kick the ball downfield without noticing that Danny Rose was behind him, allowing Rose to steal the ball and score into an empty net in the 80th minute. Killip made his first appearance since January for the final game of the season against Stockport County, where he made several saves including a stoppage time penalty save in a 1–1 draw. The game would be Killip's 150th appearance and his last for Hartlepool as it was announced on 15 May 2023 that he would be leaving the club after he rejected a new contract.

=== Barnsley ===
On 5 July 2023, Killip signed for League One club Barnsley on an initial one-year deal with the option for a further year.

=== Portsmouth ===
In February 2025 he signed for Portsmouth on a deal until the end of the season. He was offered a new contract in May 2025, and on 11 June 2025, the club announced he had signed a new two-year contract. He signed a further two-year contract in August 2026.

== International career ==
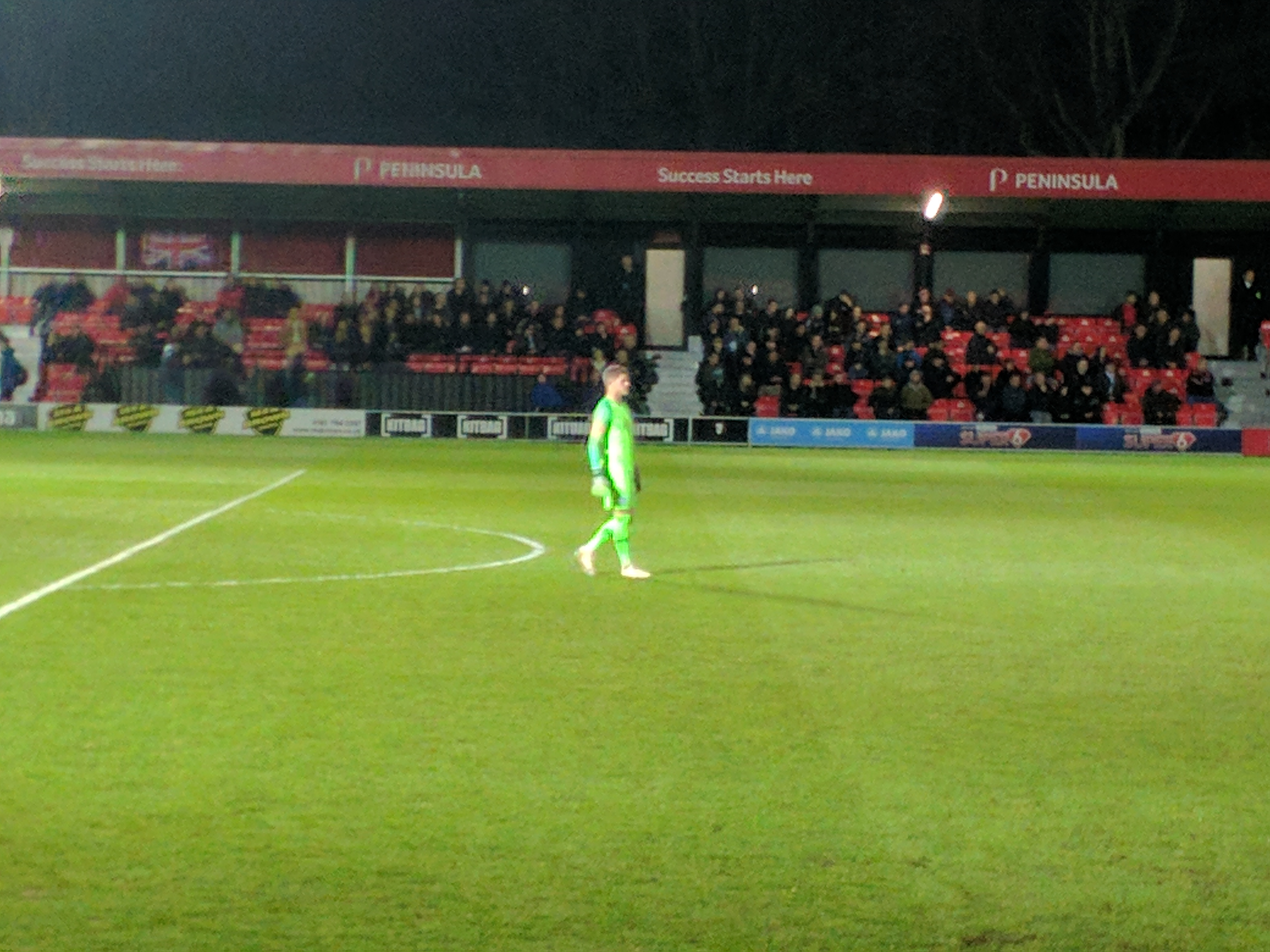
Killip playing for England C in 2019.

In September 2018, Killip received his first call up for the England C team for their game against Estonia u23s.

== Career statistics ==
As of match played 2 May 2026

Appearances and goals by club, season and competition
Club	Season	League			FA Cup		League Cup		Other		Total	
Club	Season	Division	Apps	Goals	Apps	Goals	Apps	Goals	Apps	Goals	Apps	Goals
King's Lynn Town (loan)	2013–14	NPL – Premier Division	1	0	0	0	—		0	0	1	0
Lowestoft Town (loans)	2015–16	National League North	9	0	0	0	—		1 (Note: Appearance in FA Trophy)	0	10	0
Lowestoft Town (loans)	2015–16	National League North	14	0	0	0	—		1 (Note: Appearance in the Suffolk Premier Cup)	0	15	0
Norwich City U23s	2016–17	Premier League 2 – Div 2	—		—		—		3 (Note: Appearance(s) in EFL Trophy.)	0	3	0
Grimsby Town	2017–18	League Two	7	0	0	0	0	0	3	0	10	0
Braintree Town	2018–19	National League	38	0	1	0	0	0	1	0	40	0
Hartlepool United	2019–20	National League	33	0	4	0	0	0	0	0	37	0
Hartlepool United	2020–21	National League	29	0	0	0	0	0	0	0	29	0
Hartlepool United	2021–22	League Two	42	0	4	0	0	0	3	0	49	0
Hartlepool United	2022–23	League Two	29	0	3	0	1	0	2	0	35	0
Hartlepool United	Total		133	0	11	0	1	0	5	0	150	0
Barnsley	2023–24	League One	8	0	2	0	1	0	4	0	15	0
Barnsley	2024–25	League One	17	0	2	0	0	0	2	0	21	0
Barnsley	Total		25	0	4	0	1	0	6	0	36	0
Portsmouth	2024–25	Championship	2	0	0	0	0	0	0	0	2	0
Portsmouth	2025–26	Championship	4	0	0	0	1	0	0	0	5	0
Portsmouth	2026–27	Championship	0	0	0	0	0	0	0	0	0	0
Portsmouth	Total		6	0	0	0	1	0	0	0	7	0
Career total			233	0	16	0	3	0	20	0	272	0

== Honours ==
Hartlepool United

- National League play-offs: 2021
