= Raj Singh (businessman) =

Indian businessman

Raj Singh (born 17 October 1964) is an Indian businessman based in England's Tees Valley. He is the owner of care home company Prestige Group and housing development firm Redcastle Homes. He was also previously the chairman at football clubs Darlington from 2008 to 2012 and Hartlepool United from 2018 to 2025.

== Early and personal life ==
Singh was born in October 1964. He was previously married to Manjit; who he had two sons and two daughters with.

In March 2022, in response to the 2022 Russian invasion of Ukraine, Singh pledged £250,000 towards an appeal for those affected by the war.

== Business interests ==
Indian-born Singh is owner of the Stockton-based Prestige Group. His business interests include some residential care homes, a construction company and investment properties across the UK.

He started out in business owning an off-licence in Redcar. During the 1980s, Singh began building a property portfolio in Teesside. Singh purchased his first care home in 1994 which was in Middlesbrough. As well as being the owner of Prestige Group, Singh also runs housing development firm Redcastle Homes.

== Football ==
=== Darlington F.C. ===
Singh became vice-chairman of Darlington Football Club in October 2008, appointed by then chairman of the club George Houghton until the club went into administration in February 2009. On 28 May, it was announced that he was taking over the club as chairman.

On 7 August 2009, Darlington came out of administration and were given permission by the Football League for Singh to take over as new owner and chairman of the club. Singh, together with previous owner Houghton, were confident enough to appoint manager Colin Todd in the interim period, as well as sanctioning contracts for a new playing squad. Shortly after Todd was handed a permanent deal Singh sacked Todd after he failed to win any of his first nine games and appointed Steve Staunton as his second permanent appointment.

In early 2012, Singh decided to cut his losses and placed Darlington Football Club into administration, seven months after the FA Trophy victory at Wembley in May 2011. It was the club's third administration in a decade. The club avoided liquidation in January 2012 after funding was raised from fan groups. The club managed to complete the rest of the 2011–12 but was ultimately relegated. On 3 May 2012, the club was taken over by DFC 1883 Ltd and was demoted four divisions to the Northern Football League.

In May 2017, five years after leaving Darlington, Singh announced his intentions to invest in the club again stating he had "unfinished business". However, following criticism from Darlington fans, Singh withdrew his offer.

=== Hartlepool United ===
Singh bought Darlington's arch-rivals Hartlepool United at the end of the 2017–18 season. He committed more than £1.2 million in cash to the club, saving it from the threat of administration and potential liquidation.

In 2020, the club was approached by Ryan Reynolds and Rob McElhenney who were interested in purchasing Hartlepool. It was reported in i News that Singh was sceptical and after growing frustrated with delays from Reynolds and McElhenney, the pair moved on and purchased Wrexham instead. Speaking to the paper in May 2023, club president Jeff Stelling said "It's 100 per cent true that they wanted to buy Hartlepool and it’s ironic they went for Wrexham in the end who are going into the Football League when the club who was their first choice, which was us, are going out of the Football League." However in his programme notes before a game in October 2023, Singh denied this was the case writing that "Wrexham was always their first choice and they were keeping their options open by talking to other clubs like ourselves."

Under Singh's ownership, Hartlepool earned promotion in the 2021 play-off final after defeating Torquay United.

On 26 April 2023, in an official club statement, Singh confirmed that Hartlepool United would be put up for sale. Hartlepool were relegated back to the National League after two seasons in the Football League at the end of the 2022–23 season.

On 25 January 2024, Singh rejected a takeover offer for the club from a consortium including the Hartlepool United Supporters' Trust.

On 11 March 2025, Singh resigned from his role as chairman with immediate effect due to fan pressure, continuing to fund the club for the remainder of the season whilst the club searched for a new buyer.

On 31 December 2025, it was announced that Singh has sold Hartlepool United to businessman Landon Smith with immediate effect.
