= 2026–27 Bromley F.C. season =

English football club season

Bromley
2026–27 season
- Chairman: Robin Stanton-Gleaves
- Manager: Karl Robinson (from 5 November); Byron Webster (interim); Andy Woodman (until 22 October)
- Stadium: Hayes Lane
- League One: 22nd
- EFL Cup: First round
- EFL Trophy: Group stage
- Top goalscorer: League: Victor Adeboyejo (4); All: Victor Adeboyejo (4)

The 2026–27 season is the 135th season in the history of Bromley Football Club and their first ever season in League One, the third tier of English football, following promotion as champions from League Two in the preceding season. In addition to the domestic league, the club would also participate in the FA Cup, the EFL Cup and the EFL Trophy.

== Managerial changes ==
On 22 October, Andy Woodman departed his role as manager with immediate effect on mutual terms following five years with the club, but leaves with the club in 23rd and eight points from the opening ten games. Byron Webster took on the role on an interim basis. A fortnight later, Karl Robinson was appointed as manager on a long-term contract.

== First-team squad ==
As of 14 August 2026

Note: Flags indicate national team as defined under FIFA eligibility rules; some limited exceptions apply. Players may hold more than one non-FIFA nationality.

No.	Pos.	Nation	Player
1	GK	ENG	Grant Smith
2	DF	ENG	Chanse Headman
3	DF	ENG	Richard Taylor (on loan from Bolton Wanderers)
4	MF	GRN	Ashley Charles
5	DF	ENG	Omar Sowunmi
7	FW	ENG	Ethon Archer (on loan from Luton Town)
8	MF	ENG	Ben Thompson
9	FW	ENG	Michael Cheek
11	MF	ENG	Mitch Pinnock
12	DF	ENG	Marcus Ifill
14	FW	ENG	Nicke Kabamba
15	DF	KEN	Deon Woodman
16	MF	CGO	Will Hondermarck
17	DF	GAM	Jacob Mendy
18	FW	ENG	Corey Whitely
20	FW	NGR	Victor Adeboyejo
21	DF	ENG	Kamarl Grant (on loan from Millwall)

No.	Pos.	Nation	Player
22	MF	SLE	Kamil Conteh
23	GK	ENG	Dillon Addai
24	FW	ENG	Soul Kader
25	MF	ENG	Josh Tobin
26	MF	ENG	Alex Stepien-Iwumene
28	MF	NIR	JJ McKiernan
29	FW	WAL	George Evans
30	GK	ENG	Shamal George
31	GK	IRL	Owen Mason
32	DF	ENG	Freddie Taylor
33	MF	ENG	Nathan Paul-Lavaly
34	DF	ENG	Freddie Cowin
35	DF	ENG	Nathan Patten
36	MF	ENG	Jedd Hobbs
37	MF	ENG	Hayden Bullas
38	FW	POL	Dawid Przybylo

== Transfers and contracts ==
=== In ===
Date	Pos.	Player	From	Fee	Ref.
9 July 2026	CM	(Sierra Leone) Kamil Conteh	(England) Bristol Rovers	Undisclosed	
10 July 2026	GK	(England) Shamal George	(England) Wycombe Wanderers	Free	
10 July 2026	CB	(England) Chanse Headman	(England) Harrogate Town	Undisclosed	
10 July 2026	LB	(The Gambia) Jacob Mendy	(England) Peterborough United	Free	
11 July 2026	CB	(Kenya) Deon Woodman	(England) Wealdstone	Undisclosed	
13 July 2026	CF	(Nigeria) Victor Adeboyejo	(England) Mansfield Town	Free	
24 July 2026	CM	(England) Hayden Bullas	(England) Leyton Orient	Free	
27 July 2026	CM	(Northern Ireland) JJ McKiernan	(England) Lincoln City	Undisclosed	
14 August 2026	GK	(Republic of Ireland) Owen Mason	(England) Mansfield Town	Undisclosed	
18 August 2026	CM	(England) Tobias Brenan	(England) Wigan Athletic	Undisclosed	
27 August 2026	CM	(Northern Ireland) George Saville	(England) Luton Town	Undisclosed	
28 August 2026	LWB	(England) Mickel Miller	(England) Huddersfield Town	Free	
1 September 2026	RW	(Malta) Jodi Jones	(England) Notts County	Undisclosed	
21 September 2026	CB	(England) Adam Jackson	(England) Lincoln City	Free	
19 November 2026	CB	(England) Reece Oxford	Free agent	—N/a	

=== Loans in ===
Date	Pos.	Player	From	Loaned until	Ref.
11 July 2026	LW	(England) Ethon Archer	(England) Luton Town	End of Season	
25 July 2026	CB	(England) Richard Taylor	(England) Bolton Wanderers	End of Season	
1 August 2026	CB	(England) Kamarl Grant	(England) Millwall	End of Season	

=== Loans out ===
Date	Pos.	Player	To	Loaned until	Ref.
7 August 2026	CM	(England) Hayden Bullas	(England) Tonbridge Angels	End of Season	
8 August 2026	CF	(England) Soul Kader	(England) Cray Wanderers	2 January 2027	
15 August 2026	CF	(England) George Evans	(England) Braintree Town	9 September 2026	
15 August 2026	CM	(England) Alex Stepien-Iwumene	(England) Maidstone United	2 January 2027	
18 August 2026	RB	(England) Freddie Taylor	(England) Slough Town	15 September 2026	
22 August 2026	CM	(England) Jedd Hobbs	(England) AFC Whyteleafe	2 January 2027	
3 September 2026	GK	(England) Dillon Addai	(England) Walton & Hersham	1 October 2026	
11 September 2026	CDM	(England) Josh Tobin	(England) Farnham Town	5 December 2026	
17 October 2026	CB	(England) Nathan Patten	(England) Woking	17 November 2026	
17 October 2026	RB	(England) Nathan Paul-Lavaly	(England) Woking	17 November 2026	

=== Out ===
Date	Pos.	Player	To	Fee	Ref.
28 May 2026	RW	(Gibraltar) Carlos Richards	(England) Three Bridges	Free	

=== Released / out of contract ===
Date	Pos.	Player	Subsequent club	Joined date	Ref.
29 June 2026	CB	(Scotland) Kyle Cameron	(Wales) Newport County	1 July 2026	
30 June 2026	LWB	(England) Brooklyn Ilunga	(England) Hartlepool United	1 July 2026	
30 June 2026	RB	(England) Harry Lee	(England) Gosport Borough	1 July 2026	
30 June 2026	GK	(Scotland) Sam Long	(England) Salford City	1 July 2026	
30 June 2026	LB	(England) Idris Odutayo	(Scotland) Dundee	1 July 2026	
30 June 2026	CM	(England) Jude Arthurs	(England) Crawley Town	3 July 2026	
30 June 2026	CB	(England) Sam German	(England) Walton & Herhsam	3 July 2026	
30 June 2026	CF	(England) Marcus Dinanga	(England) Aldershot Town		
30 June 2026	CF	(England) Tade Ibrahim			
30 June 2026	RB	(England) Carl Jenkinson			
30 June 2026	CB	(England) Frankie Moralee	(England) Hornchurch		
30 June 2026	CB	(England) Byron Webster	Retired		

=== New contract ===
Date	Pos.	Player	Contract expiry	Ref.
14 May 2026	GK	(England) Dillon Addai	30 June 2027	
14 May 2026	CM	(Grenada) Ashley Charles	30 June 2027	
14 May 2026	CF	(England) George Evans	30 June 2027	
14 May 2026	RB	(England) Marcus Ifill	30 June 2027	
14 May 2026	GK	(England) Grant Smith	30 June 2027	
14 May 2026	CB	(England) Omar Sowunmi	30 June 2027	
14 May 2026	RB	(England) Freddie Taylor	30 June 2027	
14 May 2026	RM	(England) Corey Whitely	30 June 2027	
24 July 2026	LB	(England) Freddie Cowin	Undisclosed (Note: First professional contract)	
24 July 2026	CF	(England) George Evans	Undisclosed	
24 July 2026	CM	(England) Jedd Hobbs	Undisclosed	
24 July 2026	CM	(England) Nathan Patten	Undisclosed	
24 July 2026	CF	(England) Dawid Przybylo	Undisclosed	
4 August 2026	CM	(Grenada) Ashley Charles	30 June 2029	

== Pre-season and friendlies ==
On 2 June, Bromley announced a home pre-season friendly against Millwall. Eight days later, two further home friendlies were confirmed against Crystal Palace and Queens Park Rangers. An away trip to face Barnet was next added to the schedule. On 24 June, it was announced that Liverpool Under-21s would visit during pre-season. Also confirmed was a trip to Albufeira, Portugal to face West Bromwich Albion.

Win Draw Loss Fixtures

4 July 2026 Friendly	Carshalton Athletic	4–0	Bromley	Carshalton
15:00 BST	George 60', 68', 72'; Fadahunsi 90+1'	Report		Stadium: War Memorial Sports Ground

14 July 2026 Friendly	Sporting CP B	3–1	Bromley	Alcochete, Portugal
12:00 WEST		Report	Paul-Lavaly	Stadium: Academia Cristiano Ronaldo; Attendance: 0 (BCD)

17 July 2026 Friendly	Bromley	1–4	West Bromwich Albion	Ferreiras, Portugal
19:00 CEST	Adeboyejo 20' (pen.)		Morgan 16'; Heggebø 45+3'; Bray 75'; Stewart 80'	Stadium: Estádio da Nora

25 July 2026 Friendly	Bromley	3–0	Crystal Palace	Bromley
15:00 BST	Adeboyejo 62', 75' (pen.); Kabamba 86'	Report		Stadium: Hayes Lane

28 July 2026 Friendly	Bromley	1–1	Millwall	Bromley
19:45 BST	Archer 43'	Report	Servais 57'	Stadium: Hayes Lane

31 July 2026 Friendly	Bromley	0–7	Queens Park Rangers	Bromley
19:30 BST		Report	Chair 2'; Lloyd 3', 59', 68' (pen.); Smyth 40'; Alemayehu 54'; Sanyaolu 56'	Stadium: Hayes Lane

1 August 2026 Friendly	Barnet	1–1	Bromley	Edgware
15:00 BST	Tshimanga 11' (pen.)	Report	McKiernan 24'	Stadium: The Hive Stadium

5 August 2026 Friendly	Bromley	Cancelled	Liverpool U21	Bromley
19:45 BST				Stadium: Hayes Lane
Note: Fixture was cancelled due to Liverpool U21 unable to fulfill the match.

== Competitions ==
=== Overall record ===
Competition	First match	Last match	Starting round	Final position	Record							
Competition	First match	Last match	Starting round	Final position	Pld	W	D	L	GF	GA	GD	Win %
EFL League One	15 August 2026	8 May 2027	Matchday 1	TBD	8	2	2	4	9	20	−11	25.00
FA Cup	6–9 November 2026	TBD	First round	TBD	0	0	0	0	0	0	+0	—
EFL Cup	8 August 2026		First round	First round	1	0	1	0	1	1	+0	0.00
EFL Trophy	22 September 2026	TBD	Group stage	TBD	0	0	0	0	0	0	+0	—
Total					9	2	3	4	10	21	−11	22.22

Last updated: 10 October 2026
Source: Soccerway

=== EFL League One ===
==== League table ====
Pos	Team	Pld	W	D	L	GF	GA	GD	Pts	Promotion, qualification or relegation
20	Doncaster Rovers	14	3	4	7	16	24	−8	13	
21	Peterborough United	14	3	4	7	13	23	−10	13	Relegation to EFL League Two
22	Blackpool	14	3	3	8	18	24	−6	12	Relegation to EFL League Two
23	Bromley	14	3	3	8	14	33	−19	12	Relegation to EFL League Two
24	Barnsley	14	2	3	9	14	26	−12	9	Relegation to EFL League Two

Updated to match(es) played on 21 November 2026. Source: EFL Official Website
Rules for classification: 1) Points; 2) Goal difference; 3) Number of goals scored; 4) Head-to-head results; 5) Wins; 6) Away goals; 7) Penalty points (sec 9.5); 8) 12-point sending off offences

==== Results summary ====
Overall								Home						Away					
Pld	W	D	L	GF	GA	GD	Pts	W	D	L	GF	GA	GD	W	D	L	GF	GA	GD
14	3	3	8	14	33	−19	12	1	2	3	4	14	−10	2	1	5	10	19	−9

Last updated: 21 November 2026.
Source: Soccerway

==== Results by round ====
Round	1	2	3	4	5	6	7	10	11	12	13	8^{1}	14	15^{3}	16	9^{2}	17	18	19	20	21	22	23	24	25	26	27	28	29	30	31	32	33	34	35	36	37	38	39	40	41	42	43	44	45	46
Ground	A	H	A	H	H	A	H	A	A	H	H	A	A	H	A	H	H	A	A	H	A	H	H	A	H	A	A	H	H	A	A	H	A	H	A	H	A	H	A	H	H	A	H	A	A	H
Result	W	D	L	L	L	D	W	L	L	L	D	L	L	P	W																															
Position	8	8	15	19	21	22	19	21	22	23	22	22	24	P	23																															
Points	3	4	4	4	4	5	8	8	8	8	9	9	9	P	12																															

Source: EFL
A = Away; H = Home; W = Win; D = Draw; L = Loss; P = Postponed
Notes:
- ^{1} Matchday 8 (vs. Milton Keynes Dons) was postponed due to international call-ups.
- ^{2} Matchday 9 (vs. Wycombe Wanderers) was postponed due to international call-ups.
- ^{3} Matchday 15 (vs. Notts County) was postponed due to international call-ups.

==== Matches ====
The League One fixtures were released on 25 June 2026.

Win Draw Loss Fixtures

15 August 2026 1	Barnsley	0–1	Bromley	Barnsley
15:00 BST	Bland (yellow card) 38'; McGeehan (yellow card) 77'; Kirk (yellow card) 90+5'	Report	Adeboyejo 70'; Pinnock (yellow card) 77'; Hondermarck (yellow card) 90+1'	Stadium: Oakwell; Attendance: 11,163 (360 away); Referee: Ross Martin

22 August 2026 2	Bromley	1–1	Cambridge United	Bromley
15:00 BST	Adeboyejo 81'; Headman (yellow card) 90+4'	Report	Ball (yellow card) 61'; Knight 67'; Lavery (yellow card) 90+4'	Stadium: Hayes Lane; Attendance: 4,938 (805 away); Referee: Kirsty Dowle

29 August 2026 3	Sheffield Wednesday	7–2	Bromley	Sheffield
15:00 BST	Slattery 7', (yellow card) 90+3'; Burstow 31'; J. Lowe 45', 73'; Barry 46', 49'; Otegbayo 81'	Report	Pinnock (yellow card) 34'; Sowunmi (yellow card) 56'; Adeboyejo 85' (pen.); Otegbayo 87' (o.g.)	Stadium: Hillsborough Stadium; Attendance: 30,006 (800 away); Referee: Will Finnie

1 September 2026 4	Bromley	0–5	Leyton Orient	Bromley
19:45 BST	Mendy (yellow card) 45+1'; Pinnock (yellow card) 57'; Hondermarck (yellow card) 83'	Report	Stevens (yellow card) 5'; Kabia 36', 66'; Akhamrich 46', 51'; Chinedu (yellow card) 48'; Dobra 90+1'	Stadium: Hayes Lane; Attendance: 5,022 (825 away); Referee: Stephen Parkinson

7 September 2026 5	Bromley	0–2	AFC Wimbledon	Bromley
20:00 BST	McKiernan (yellow card) 78'	Report	Stockley 8'; Sweeney (yellow card) 44'; Hippolyte 67'	Stadium: Hayes Lane; Attendance: 5,017 (819 away); Referee: Lewis Sandoe
Note: Fixture was initially scheduled for 5 September, but was moved for live Sky Sports broadcast.

12 September 2026 6	Blackpool	2–2	Bromley	Blackpool
15:00 BST	Morgan 10'; Bloxham 44'	Report	Adeboyejo 18'; Mason (yellow card) 43'; Brown 55' (o.g.)	Stadium: Bloomfield Road; Attendance: 8,985 (200 away); Referee: Ben Speedie

19 September 2026 7	Bromley	2–1	Huddersfield Town	Bromley
15:00 BST	McKiernan 9'; Pinnock (yellow card) 44'; Miller (yellow card) 55', (goal) 71'	Report	Fletcher 45+3'; Taylor (yellow card) 66'; Mumba (yellow card) 90+4'	Stadium: Hayes Lane; Attendance: 5,004 (819 away); Referee: Carl Brook

10 October 2026 10	Mansfield Town	2–1	Bromley	Mansfield
15:00 BST	McLaughlin 22'; Moriah-Welsh 49'; Thompson (yellow card) 51'; Reed (yellow card) 60'; Blake-Tracy (yellow card) 74'	Report	Ifill (yellow card) 13'; McKiernan 30', (yellow card) 32'; Kabamba (yellow card) 90+3'; Saville (yellow card) 90+4'	Stadium: Field Mill; Attendance: 6,430 (230 away); Referee: Simon Mather

17 October 2026 11	Stockport County	1–0	Bromley	Stockport
15:00 BST	Wootton 19'; Norwood (yellow card) 27'	Report	Conteh (yellow card) 50'; Smith (yellow card) 76'	Stadium: Edgeley Park; Attendance: 9,030 (242 away); Referee: Seb Stockbridge

20 October 2026 12	Bromley	0–4	Leicester City	Bromley
19:45 BST	Saville (yellow card) 39'; Ifill (yellow card) 45+2'	Report	Alves 4'; Braybrooke (yellow card) 7'; Lundstram 16'; Thomas 45+2'; Riis (yellow card) 58', (goal) 67'	Stadium: Hayes Lane; Attendance: 4,938 (825 away); Referee: Alex Chilowicz

24 October 2026 13	Bromley	1–1	Peterborough United	Bromley
15:00 BST	Cheek 10'; Grant (yellow card) 84'	Report	Masara 90+3'	Stadium: Hayes Lane; Attendance: 4,880 (835 away); Referee: Edward Duckworth

27 October 2026 8	Milton Keynes Dons	4–1	Bromley	Milton Keynes
19:45 GMT	Collins 40', 62'; Gilbey 71'; Goode 79'; Paterson (yellow card) 82'	Report	Pinnock 45+2'; McKiernan (yellow card) 86'	Stadium: Stadium MK; Attendance: 6,415 (218 away); Referee: Scott Jackson
Note: Fixture was originally scheduled for 26 September, but was postponed due to international call-ups and then later rearranged.

31 October 2026 14	Wigan Athletic	3–2	Bromley	Wigan
15:00 GMT	Saydee 18'; Miller 23'; R. Walsh (yellow card) 56'; Burrowes 58'; Barrett (yellow card) 82'	Report	Grant 6'; Saville 45+2', (yellow card) 90+4'; Whitely (yellow card) 65'; McKiernan (yellow card) 76'; Hondermarck (yellow card) 80'; Ifill (yellow card) 83'	Stadium: Brick Community Stadium; Referee: Martin Coy

14 November 2026 15	Bromley	Postponed	Notts County	Bromley
15:00 GMT		Report		Stadium: Hayes Lane
Note: Fixture was postponed due to international call-ups.

21 November 2026 16	Reading	0–1	Bromley	Reading
12:30 GMT		Report	Adeboyejo 58'	Stadium: Madejski Stadium; Attendance: 12,300; Referee: Ross Martin
Note: Fixture was initially scheduled for a 15:00 kick-off, but was brought forward for live Sky Sports broadcasting.

24 November 2026 9	Bromley	v	Wycombe Wanderers	Bromley
19:45 GMT		Report		Stadium: Hayes Lane
Note: Fixture was originally scheduled for 3 October, but was postponed due to international call-ups. It was then rearranged for 24 November.

28 November 2026 17	Bromley	–	Burton Albion	Bromley
15:00 GMT		Report		Stadium: Hayes Lane

1 December 2026 18	Plymouth Argyle	–	Bromley	Plymouth
19:45 GMT		Report		Stadium: Home Park

12 December 2026 19	Doncaster Rovers	–	Bromley	Doncaster
15:00 GMT		Report		Stadium: Eco-Power Stadium

19 December 2026 20	Bromley	–	Bradford City	Bromley
15:00 GMT		Report		Stadium: Hayes Lane

26 December 2026 21	Luton Town	–	Bromley	Luton
15:00 GMT		Report		Stadium: Kenilworth Road

29 December 2026 22	Bromley	–	Oxford United	Bromley
19:45 GMT		Report		Stadium: Hayes Lane

1 January 2027 23	Bromley	–	Stevenage	Bromley
15:00 GMT		Report		Stadium: Hayes Lane

9 January 2027 24	Bradford City	–	Bromley	Bradford
15:00 GMT		Report		Stadium: Valley Parade

16 January 2027 25	Bromley	–	Stockport County	Bromley
12:30 GMT		Report		Stadium: Hayes Lane
Note: Fixture was initially scheduled for a 15:00 kick-off, but was brought forward for live Sky Sports broadcasting.

19 January 2027 26	Leicester City	–	Bromley	Leicester
19:45 GMT		Report		Stadium: King Power Stadium

23 January 2027 27	Peterborough United	–	Bromley	Peterborough
15:00 GMT		Report		Stadium: London Road Stadium

30 January 2027 28	Bromley	–	Wigan Athletic	Bromley
15:00 GMT		Report		Stadium: Hayes Lane

6 February 2027 29	Bromley	–	Sheffield Wednesday	Bromley
15:00 GMT		Report		Stadium: Hayes Lane

9 February 2027 30	Leyton Orient	–	Bromley	Leyton
19:45 GMT		Report		Stadium: Brisbane Road

13 February 2027 31	AFC Wimbledon	–	Bromley	Wimbledon
15:00 GMT		Report		Stadium: Plough Lane

20 February 2027 32	Bromley	–	Blackpool	Bromley
15:00 GMT		Report		Stadium: Hayes Lane

27 February 2027 33	Notts County	–	Bromley	Wimbledon
15:00 GMT		Report		Stadium: Plough Lane

6 March 2027 34	Bromley	–	Barnsley	Bromley
15:00 GMT		Report		Stadium: Hayes Lane

13 March 2027 35	Cambridge United	–	Bromley	Cambridge
15:00 GMT		Report		Stadium: Abbey Stadium

20 March 2027 36	Bromley	–	Reading	Bromley
15:00 GMT		Report		Stadium: Hayes Lane

26 March 2027 37	Stevenage	–	Bromley	Stevenage
15:00 GMT		Report		Stadium: Broadhall Way

29 March 2027 38	Bromley	–	Doncaster Rovers	Bromley
15:00 BST		Report		Stadium: Hayes Lane

3 April 2027 39	Oxford United	–	Bromley	Oxford
15:00 BST		Report		Stadium: Kassam Stadium

10 April 2027 40	Bromley	–	Luton Town	Bromley
15:00 BST		Report		Stadium: Hayes Lane

13 April 2027 41	Bromley	–	Milton Keynes Dons	Bromley
19:45 BST		Report		Stadium: Hayes Lane

17 April 2027 42	Huddersfield Town	–	Bromley	Huddersfield
15:00 BST		Report		Stadium: Kirklees Stadium

24 April 2027 43	Bromley	–	Mansfield Town	Bromley
15:00 BST		Report		Stadium: Hayes Lane

27 April 2027 44	Wycombe Wanderers	–	Bromley	High Wycombe
19:45 BST		Report		Stadium: Adams Park

1 May 2027 45	Burton Albion	–	Bromley	Burton upon Trent
15:00 BST		Report		Stadium: Pirelli Stadium

8 May 2027 46	Bromley	–	Plymouth Argyle	Bromley
12:30 BST		Report		Stadium: Hayes Lane

=== FA Cup ===
Bromley were drawn at home to Rotherham United in the first round.

Win Draw Loss Fixtures

7 November 2026 First round	Bromley	0–2	Rotherham United	Bromley
15:00 GMT	Mendy (yellow card) 30'	Report	Aljofree 45+1'; Bradshaw 56'	Stadium: The CopperJax Community Stadium; Attendance: 2,044; Referee: Sam Mulhall

=== EFL Cup ===
Bromley were drawn at home to Reading in the first round.

Win Draw Loss Fixtures

8 August 2026 First round	Bromley	1–1 (4–5 p)	Reading	Bromley
15:00 BST	Cheek 33'; Taylor (yellow card) 69' (yellow-red card) 90'; Archer (yellow card) 90+8'	Report	Stokes 14'; Wing (penalty missed) 70'; Williams (yellow card) 90+11'	Stadium: Hayes Lane; Attendance: 3,496 (825 away); Referee: Craig Hicks
	Penalties
	Adeboyejo (penalty scored); McKiernan (penalty scored); Ifill (penalty scored); Conteh (penalty scored); Archer (penalty missed)		(penalty scored) Wing; (penalty scored) Savage; (penalty scored) Marriott; (penalty scored) Fraser; (penalty scored) Williams

=== EFL Trophy ===
==== Group stage ====
Bromley were drawn against Milton Keynes Dons, Crawley Town and Brentford U21.

Pos	Div	Team	Pld	W	PW	PL	L	GF	GA	GD	Pts	Qualification
1	L1	Milton Keynes Dons	3	3	0	0	0	13	3	+10	9	Advance to Round 2
2	ACA	Brentford U21	3	2	0	0	1	4	8	−4	6	Advance to Round 2
3	L2	Crawley Town	3	1	0	0	2	6	6	0	3	
4	L1	Bromley	3	0	0	0	3	1	7	−6	0	

Source: EFL

Round	1	2	3
Ground	H	A	H
Result	L	L	L
Position	3	4	4
Points	0	0	0

Source: English Football League
A = Away; H = Home; W = Win; D = Draw; L = Loss

Win Draw Loss Fixtures

22 September 2026 1	Bromley	0–1	Brentford U21	Bromley
19:30 BST	Haftom (yellow card) 65'; Brenan (yellow card) 73'	Report	Nunes (yellow card) 57'; Shield 85'	Stadium: Hayes Lane; Referee: Harrison Blair

6 October 2026 2	Crawley Town	4–0	Bromley	Crawley
19:45 BST	Patten 35' (o.g.); Duke-McKenna 48', 90+1'; Porter 51' (o.g.); Barker (yellow card) 76'; Kamara (yellow card) 85'	Report	Kabamba (yellow card) 76'; Patten (yellow card) 76'; Brenan (yellow card) 79'	Stadium: Broadfield Stadium; Referee: Sam Mulhall

10 November 2026 3	Bromley	1–2	Milton Keynes Dons	Bromley
19:30 GMT	Kabamba 22'; Saville (yellow card) 51'		Paterson 27'; Burke 51', (yellow card) 55'	Stadium: Hayes Lane; Referee: Matthew Norton

== Statistics ==
=== Appearances ===
As of match played 21 November 2026

Players with no appearances are not included on the list; italics indicate a loaned in player

No.	Pos	Nat	Player	Total		League One		FA Cup		EFL Cup		EFL Trophy	
No.	Pos	Nat	Player	Apps	Goals	Apps	Goals	Apps	Goals	Apps	Goals	Apps	Goals
1	GK	(England) ENG	Grant Smith	6	0	5+0	0	0+0	0	0+0	0	1+0	0
2	DF	(England) ENG	Chanse Headman	8	0	2+3	0	0+1	0	0+1	0	1+0	0
3	DF	(England) ENG	Richard Taylor	9	0	5+1	0	1+0	0	0+1	0	1+0	0
4	MF	(Grenada) GRN	Ashley Charles	1	0	0+0	0	0+0	0	1+0	0	0+0	0
5	DF	(England) ENG	Omar Sowunmi	13	0	11+1	0	0+0	0	1+0	0	0+0	0
6	MF	(Northern Ireland) NIR	George Saville	13	1	11+0	1	1+0	0	0+0	0	1+0	0
7	FW	(England) ENG	Ethon Archer	11	0	1+5	0	0+1	0	0+1	0	3+0	0
8	MF	(England) ENG	Ben Thompson	8	0	3+3	0	0+0	0	0+0	0	2+0	0
9	FW	(England) ENG	Michael Cheek	19	2	8+6	1	1+0	0	1+0	1	2+1	0
10	FW	(Malta) MLT	Jodi Jones	11	0	4+3	0	1+0	0	0+0	0	2+1	0
11	FW	(England) ENG	Mitch Pinnock	17	1	14+0	1	0+1	0	1+0	0	1+0	0
12	FW	(England) ENG	Marcus Ifill	17	0	14+0	0	1+0	0	1+0	0	1+0	0
14	FW	(Democratic Republic of the Congo) COD	Nicke Kabamba	11	1	0+7	0	0+1	0	0+0	0	3+0	1
15	DF	(Kenya) KEN	Deon Woodman	1	0	1+0	0	0+0	0	0+0	0	0+0	0
16	MF	(Republic of the Congo) CGO	Will Hondermarck	13	0	8+4	0	0+0	0	1+0	0	0+0	0
17	DF	(The Gambia) GAM	Jacob Mendy	12	0	6+1	0	1+0	0	1+0	0	3+0	0
18	FW	(England) ENG	Corey Whitely	15	0	9+4	0	0+0	0	1+0	0	1+0	0
19	DF	(England) ENG	Mickel Miller	13	1	2+7	1	1+0	0	0+0	0	0+3	0
20	FW	(Nigeria) NGR	Victor Adeboyejo	15	5	8+6	5	0+0	0	0+1	0	0+0	0
21	DF	(England) ENG	Kamarl Grant	14	1	9+3	1	1+0	0	1+0	0	0+0	0
22	MF	(Sierra Leone) SLE	Kamil Conteh	16	0	12+1	0	1+0	0	1+0	0	1+0	0
26	MF	(England) ENG	Alex Stepien-Iwumene	1	0	0+0	0	0+0	0	0+0	0	0+1	0
27	MF	(England) ENG	Tobias Brenan	3	0	0+1	0	0+0	0	0+0	0	2+0	0
28	MF	(Northern Ireland) NIR	JJ McKiernan	16	2	6+7	2	1+0	0	0+1	0	0+1	0
30	GK	(England) ENG	Shamal George	8	0	6+0	0	1+0	0	1+0	0	0+0	0
31	GK	(Republic of Ireland) IRL	Owen Mason	4	0	3+1	0	0+0	0	0+0	0	0+0	0
33	DF	(England) ENG	Nathan Paul-Lavaly	1	0	0+0	0	0+0	0	0+0	0	1+0	0
34	DF	(England) ENG	Freddie Cowan	4	0	0+1	0	0+1	0	0+0	0	0+2	0
35	DF	(England) ENG	Nathan Patten	2	0	0+0	0	0+0	0	0+0	0	2+0	0
36	MF	(England) ENG	Jedd Hobbs	1	0	0+0	0	0+0	0	0+0	0	0+1	0
39	DF	(England) ENG	Reece Oxford	1	0	1+0	0	0+0	0	0+0	0	0+0	0
40	GK	(England) ENG	Rex Porter	2	0	0+0	0	0+0	0	0+0	0	2+0	0
45	DF	(England) ENG	Adam Jackson	7	0	5+0	0	0+0	0	0+0	0	2+0	0
50	DF	(England) ENG	Jonathan Haftom	2	0	0+0	0	0+0	0	0+0	0	1+1	0

=== Clean sheets ===
As of match played 21 November 2026

Rank	No.	Player	League One	FA Cup	EFL Cup	EFL Trophy	Total
1	30	(England) Shamal George	2	0	0	0	2
Total			2	0	0	0	2

=== Disciplinary record ===
As of match played 21 November 2026

Rank	No.	Pos.	Player	League One			FA Cup			EFL Cup			EFL Trophy			Total		
Rank	No.	Pos.	Player	Yellow card	(yellow card) (yellow-red card)	Red card	Yellow card	(yellow card) (yellow-red card)	Red card	Yellow card	(yellow card) (yellow-red card)	Red card	Yellow card	(yellow card) (yellow-red card)	Red card	Yellow card	(yellow card) (yellow-red card)	Red card
1	6	CM	(Northern Ireland) George Saville	3	0	0	0	0	0	0	0	0	1	0	0	4	0	0
1	11	LW	(England) Mitch Pinnock	4	0	0	0	0	0	0	0	0	0	0	0	4	0	0
1	28	CM	(Northern Ireland) JJ McKiernan	4	0	0	0	0	0	0	0	0	0	0	0	4	0	0
4	12	RB	(England) Marcus Ifill	3	0	0	0	0	0	0	0	0	0	0	0	3	0	0
4	16	CM	(Republic of the Congo) Will Hondermarck	3	0	0	0	0	0	0	0	0	0	0	0	3	0	0
6	3	CB	(England) Richard Taylor	0	0	0	0	0	0	0	1	0	0	0	0	0	1	0
6	14	CF	(Democratic Republic of the Congo) Nicke Kabamba	1	0	0	0	0	0	0	0	0	1	0	0	2	0	0
6	17	LB	(The Gambia) Jacob Mendy	1	0	0	1	0	0	0	0	0	0	0	0	2	0	0
6	21	CB	(England) Kamarl Grant	2	0	0	0	0	0	0	0	0	0	0	0	2	0	0
6	27	CM	(England) Tobias Brenan	0	0	0	0	0	0	0	0	0	2	0	0	2	0	0
11	1	GK	(England) Grant Smith	1	0	0	0	0	0	0	0	0	0	0	0	1	0	0
11	2	CB	(England) Chanse Headman	1	0	0	0	0	0	0	0	0	0	0	0	1	0	0
11	5	CB	(England) Omar Sowunmi	1	0	0	0	0	0	0	0	0	0	0	0	1	0	0
11	7	LW	(England) Ethon Archer	0	0	0	0	0	0	1	0	0	0	0	0	1	0	0
11	18	RM	(England) Corey Whitely	1	0	0	0	0	0	0	0	0	0	0	0	1	0	0
11	19	LWB	(England) Mickel Miller	1	0	0	0	0	0	0	0	0	0	0	0	1	0	0
11	22	CM	(Sierra Leone) Kamil Conteh	1	0	0	0	0	0	0	0	0	0	0	0	1	0	0
11	31	GK	(Republic of Ireland) Owen Mason	1	0	0	0	0	0	0	0	0	0	0	0	1	0	0
11	35	CB	(England) Nathan Patten	0	0	0	0	0	0	0	0	0	1	0	0	1	0	0
11	50	CB	(England) Jonathan Haftom	0	0	0	0	0	0	0	0	0	1	0	0	1	0	0
Total				28	0	0	1	0	0	1	1	0	6	0	0	36	1	0

== Awards ==
=== Player Awards ===
==== EFL League One Goal of the Month ====
Month	Player	Opposition	Result	Ref.
August	(Nigeria) Victor Adeboyejo	v. Cambridge United	Nominated	
