= 2025–26 Harrogate Town A.F.C. season =

112th season in existence of Harrogate Town AFC

Harrogate Town
2025–26 season
- Chairman: Irving Weaver
- Manager: Simon Weaver
- Stadium: Wetherby Road
- League Two: 23rd (relegated)
- FA Cup: First round
- EFL Cup: First round
- EFL Trophy: Round of 16

The 2025–26 season is the 112th season in the history of Harrogate Town Association Football Club and their sixth consecutive season in League Two. In addition to the domestic league, the club would also participate in the FA Cup, the EFL Cup, and the EFL Trophy.

== Transfers ==
=== In ===
Date	Pos.	Player	From	Fee	Ref.
1 July 2025 (Note: The transfer was announced on 12 June, and would become official on July 1 once his contract at Burton had ended)	LW	(England) Mason Bennett	(England) Burton Albion	Free	
1 July 2025 (Note: The transfer was announced on 12 June, and would become official on July 1 once his contract at Cheltenham had ended)	CB	(England) Tom Bradbury	(England) Cheltenham Town	Free	
1 July 2025 (Note: The transfer was announced on 2 June, and would become official on July 1 once his contract at Grimsby had ended)	CB	(England) Lewis Cass	(England) Grimsby Town	Free	
1 July 2025 (Note: The transfer was announced on 28 May, and would become official on July 1 once his contract at Halifax had ended)	LB	(England) Jack Evans	(England) FC Halifax Town	Free	
1 July 2025 (Note: The transfer was announced on 5 June, and would become official on July 1 once his contract at Maidenhead had ended)	CF	(England) Shawn McCoulsky	(England) Maidenhead United	Free	
1 July 2025 (Note: The transfer was announced on 18 June, and would become official on July 1 once his contract at Maidenhead had ended)	LW	(England) Reece Smith	(England) Maidenhead United	Free	
8 August 2025	CF	(England) Conor McAleny	(England) Salford City	Free	
21 November 2025	CB	(England) Kyle Jameson	(Wales) Newport County	Free	
1 January 2026 (Note: The transfer was announced on 29 December, and would become official on January 1 once his contract at Waterford had ended)	CB	(England) Grant Horton	(Republic of Ireland) Waterford	Free	
15 January 2026	CB	(England) Chanse Headman	(England) Brentford	Free Transfer	
15 January 2026	CB	(Republic of Ireland) Cathal Heffernan	(England) Newcastle United	Undisclosed	
23 January 2026	CF	(England) Aiden Marsh	(England) Truro City	Free	
2 February 2026	GK	(England) Sam Waller	(England) Burnley	Undisclosed	

=== Out ===
Date	Pos.	Player	To	Fee	Ref.
2 July 2025	CF	(England) Jack Bray	(England) West Bromwich Albion	Undisclosed	
13 January 2026	GK	(England) James Belshaw	(England) Notts County	Undisclosed	
30 January 2026	CF	(England) Tom Cursons	(England) Boston United	Undisclosed	

=== Loaned in ===
Date	Pos.	Player	From	Date until	Ref.
2 July 2025	CB	(England) Bobby Faulkner	(England) Doncaster Rovers	31 May 2026	
1 September 2025	LB	(Republic of Ireland) Jacob Slater	(England) Brighton & Hove Albion	31 May 2026 (Note: On 8 January, Slater's loan from Brighton was extended until the end of the season)	
12 January 2026	GK	(New Zealand) Henry Gray	(England) Ipswich Town	31 May 2026	
13 January 2026	CF	(England) Emile Acquah	(Scotland) Dundee	31 May 2026	
23 January 2026	CF	(England) Emmerson Sutton	(England) Queens Park Rangers	31 May 2026	
2 February 2026	CM	(England) Tobias Brenan	(England) Wigan Athletic	31 May 2026	

=== Loaned out ===
Date	Pos.	Player	To	Date until	Ref.
25 September 2025	CB	(England) Marcus Etherington	(England) Ossett United	23 October 2025	
15 January 2026	CB	(England) Marcus Etherington	(England) Stocksbridge Park Steels	3 April 2026 (Note: On 16 March, Etherington's loan at Stocksbridge Park Steels was extended until the end of the season, but on 3 April he returned from his loan due to sustaining an injury)	
26 March 2026	CF	(England) Conor McAleny	(England) AFC Fylde	31 May 2026	

=== Released / Out of Contract ===
Date	Pos.	Player	Subsequent club	Join date	Ref.
30 June 2025	CM	(Scotland) Dean Cornelius	(Scotland) Ross County	1 July 2025	
30 June 2025	CF	(England) Josh March	(England) Crewe Alexandra	1 July 2025	
30 June 2025	RB	(England) Toby Sims	(United States) Greenville Triumph	1 July 2025	
30 June 2025	LW	(England) James Daly	(England) Yeovil Town	2 July 2025	
30 June 2025	AM	(England) Matty Daly	(England) Hartlepool United	25 July 2025	
30 June 2025	LB	(England) Matty Foulds	(Scotland) St Johnstone	28 July 2025	
30 June 2025	CM	(Northern Ireland) Stephen Dooley	(Republic of Ireland) Galway United	29 July 2025	
21 January 2026	CB	(England) Kyle Jameson	(England) Morecambe	14 February 2026	

=== New Contract ===
Date	Pos.	Player	Contracted until	Ref.
2 June 2025	CB	(Republic of Ireland) Anthony O'Connor	30 June 2027	
3 June 2025	CF	(England) Jack Muldoon	30 June 2026	
31 July 2025	LB	(England) Liam Gibson	30 June 2026	
28 August 2025	LM	(England) Ellis Taylor	30 June 2027	

== Pre-season and friendlies ==
On 19 May, Harrogate Town announced their first pre-season friendly, against Ilkeston Town. In June, four further frienlies were confirmed to be against Carlisle United, Barnsley, Rotherham United and Guiseley.

Win Draw Loss Fixtures

8 July 2025 Friendly	Guiseley	0–1	Harrogate Town	Guiseley
19:30 BST		Report	Bradbury 83'	Stadium: Nethermoor Park

12 July 2025 Friendly	Ilkeston Town	0–0	Harrogate Town	Ilkeston
14:00 BST		Report		Stadium: New Manor Ground

15 July 2025 Friendly	Harrogate Town	0–3	Rotherham United	Harrogate
19:00 BST		Report	Hugill 46', 63', 73'	Stadium: Wetherby Road; Attendance: 1,269

19 July 2025 Friendly	Harrogate Town	0–3	Barnsley	Harrogate
15:00 BST		Report	Shepherd 7'; McGoldrick 44'; Yoganathan 86'	Stadium: Wetherby Road

26 July 2025 Friendly	Harrogate Town	0–2	Carlisle United	Harrogate
15:00 BST		Report	Linney 25'; Armstrong 45'	Stadium: Wetherby Road

== Competitions ==
=== League Two ===
==== League table ====
Pos	Team	Pld	W	D	L	GF	GA	GD	Pts	Promotion, qualification or relegation
20	Newport County	46	12	7	27	48	77	−29	43	
21	Tranmere Rovers	46	10	11	25	54	79	−25	41	
22	Crawley Town	46	8	16	22	44	68	−24	40	
23	Harrogate Town (R)	46	10	9	27	39	68	−29	39	Relegation to National League
24	Barrow (R)	46	9	9	28	45	78	−33	36	Relegation to National League

Source: EFL Official Website
Rules for classification: 1) Points; 2) Goal difference; 3) Number of goals scored; 4) Head-to-head results; 5) Wins; 6) Away goals; 7) Penalty points (sec 9.5); 8) 12-point sending off offences
(R) Relegated

==== Results summary ====
Overall								Home						Away					
Pld	W	D	L	GF	GA	GD	Pts	W	D	L	GF	GA	GD	W	D	L	GF	GA	GD
46	10	9	27	39	68	−29	39	4	3	16	16	38	−22	6	6	11	23	30	−7

Last updated: complete.
Source: Soccerway

==== Results by round ====
Round	1	2	3	4	5	6	7	8	9	10	11	12	13	14	15	16	17	18	19	20	21	22	23	24	26	27	28	29	30	25^{1}	31	32	33	34	35	36	37	38	39	40	41	42	43	44	45	46
Ground	A	H	A	H	H	A	H	A	H	A	H	A	A	H	H	A	H	A	H	A	H	A	A	H	A	A	H	H	A	H	H	A	A	H	H	A	H	A	A	H	A	H	A	H	A	H
Result	W	D	D	W	L	L	L	L	W	W	L	L	L	L	L	D	L	D	L	D	L	L	L	L	D	L	L	L	L	L	W	D	W	D	D	L	L	W	L	L	W	L	L	W	W	L
Position	7	8	12	8	11	14	15	17	16	16	16	17	19	19	21	22	23	23	23	22	23	23	24	24	23	23	24	24	24	24	24	23	23	23	23	24	24	23	23	24	24	24	24	24	23	23
Points	3	4	5	8	8	8	8	8	11	14	14	14	14	14	14	15	15	16	16	17	17	17	17	17	18	18	18	18	18	18	21	22	25	26	27	27	27	30	30	30	33	33	33	36	39	39

Source: EFL
A = Away; H = Home; W = Win; D = Draw; L = Loss; P = Postponed
Notes:
- ^{1} Matchday 25 (vs. Swindon Town) was postponed due to a frozen pitch.

==== Matches ====
On 26 June, the League Two fixtures were announced, with Harrogate away to Bristol Rovers on the opening day.

Win Draw Loss Fixtures

2 August 2025 1	Bristol Rovers	0–1	Harrogate Town	Horfield
15:00 BST	Bilongo (yellow card) 90+1'	Report	McCoulsky (yellow card) 54'; Duke-McKenna 63'; O'Connor (yellow card) 77'; Hill (yellow card) 84'	Stadium: Memorial Stadium; Attendance: 9,242; Referee: Carl Brook

9 August 2025 2	Harrogate Town	3–3	Grimsby Town	Harrogate
15:00 BST	Bradbury (yellow card) 7'; Duke-McKenna (yellow card) 11'; Burrell (yellow card) 15'; Smith 58'; Taylor 71' (pen.); McAleny 76', (yellow card) 88'; O'Connor (yellow card) 90+5'	Report	Rodgers (yellow card) 38', (goal) 84'; Burns (yellow card) 51'; Vernam 68'; Kabia 90+2'; Gardner (yellow card) 90+6'	Stadium: Wetherby Road; Attendance: 3,562; Referee: James Bancroft

16 August 2025 3	Cambridge United	1–1	Harrogate Town	Cambridge
15:00 BST	Appéré 18'; Knight (yellow card) 70'	Report	Evans (yellow card) 17'; Duke-McKenna 52'	Stadium: Abbey Stadium; Attendance: 5,737; Referee: Kirsty Dowle

19 August 2025 4	Harrogate Town	1–0	Barrow	Harrogate
19:45 BST	McCoulsky 29'	Report		Stadium: Wetherby Road; Attendance: 3,003; Referee: Jamie O'Connor

23 August 2025 5	Harrogate Town	1–2	Chesterfield	Harrogate
15:00 BST	Duke-McKenna 50'	Report	Darcy 6'; Dibley-Dias (yellow card) 39'; Dunkley 81'	Stadium: Wetherby Road; Attendance: 3,276; Referee: Steven Copeland

30 August 2025 6	Bromley	2–0	Harrogate Town	Bromley
15:00 BST	Kabamba 74'; Sowunmi 80'; Krauhaus (yellow card) 88'; Charles (yellow card) 90+4'	Report	Duke-McKenna (yellow card) 49'; Morris (yellow card) 79'	Stadium: Hayes Lane; Attendance: 2,340 (106 away); Referee: Alan Young

6 September 2025 7	Harrogate Town	0–1	Crawley Town	Harrogate
15:00 BST	Burrell (yellow card) 90+6'	Report	Brown 42', (yellow card) 82'; Barker (yellow card) 45+3'; Loft (yellow card) 66' (yellow-red card) 90+1'; Conroy (yellow card) 79'	Stadium: Wetherby Road; Attendance: 2,757 (168 away); Referee: Thomas Parsons

13 September 2025 8	Swindon Town	3–1	Harrogate Town	Swindon
15:00 BST	Snowdon (yellow card) 28'; Clarke 44'; Munroe (yellow card) 48'; Drinan 71', 90+1'	Report	Asare (yellow card) 17'; Muldoon 30'; Morris (yellow card) 53'	Stadium: County Ground; Attendance: 7,829 (126 away); Referee: Scott Jackson

20 September 2025 9	Harrogate Town	2–0	Shrewsbury Town	Harrogate
12:30 BST	Taylor (yellow card) 31'; Evans (yellow card) 62'; Muldoon 65'; Slater (yellow card) 71'; McAleny 87'	Report	Perry (yellow card) 2'; Sang (yellow card) 39'; Ihionvien (yellow card) 39'	Stadium: Wetherby Road; Attendance: 2019; Referee: Ross Joyce
Note: Fixture was originally scheduled for a 15:00 kick-off, but was moved live Sky Sports broadcasting.

27 September 2025 10	Gillingham	0–1	Harrogate Town	Gillingham
15:00 BST	Clark (yellow card) 84'	Report	Duke-McKenna 16'; Taylor (yellow card) 50'	Stadium: Priestfield Stadium; Attendance: 7,406 (85 away); Referee: James Bell

6 October 2025 11	Harrogate Town	1–2	Crewe Alexandra	Harrogate
20:00 BST	Muldoon 5'; Morris (yellow card) 73'; Burrell (yellow card) 90'		Hutchinson 29'; Sanders 87'	Stadium: Wetherby Road; Attendance: 2,503; Referee: Simon Mather
Note: Fixture was originally scheduled for 4 October, but was rescheduled for live Sky Sports broadcasting.

11 October 2025 12	Fleetwood Town	3–2	Harrogate Town	Fleetwood
15:00 BST	Davies 31'; Bonds 72'; Graydon 78'	Report	Burrell 16'; Muldoon 56'	Stadium: Highbury Stadium; Attendance: 2,393 (205 away); Referee: Darren Drysdale

18 October 2025 13	Colchester United	3–1	Harrogate Town	Colchester
15:00 BST	Anderson 14', 21', 45+2'; Iandolo (yellow card) 37'	Report	Duke-McKenna 3'; Muldoon (yellow card) 45+6'; Fox (yellow card) 47'; Slater (yellow card) 72'	Stadium: Colchester Community Stadium; Attendance: 4,913 (88 away); Referee: Seb Stockbrige

25 October 2025 14	Harrogate Town	0–3	Newport County	Harrogate
15:00 BST	Evans (yellow card) 44'; Muldoon (yellow card) 53'	Report	Baker-Richardson 12'; Faulkner 49' (o.g.); Antwi 51'	Stadium: Wetherby Road; Attendance: 2,822; Referee: Simon Mather

8 November 2025 15	Harrogate Town	0–1	Oldham Athletic	Harrogate
15:00 GMT	O'Connor (yellow card) 24'; Evans (yellow card) 90+7'	Report	Monthé 23'; Woods (yellow card) 65' (yellow-red card) 79'; Garner (yellow card) 67'	Stadium: Wetherby Road; Attendance: 4,023; Referee: David Rock

15 November 2025 16	Notts County	1–1	Harrogate Town	Nottingham
15:00 GMT	Dennis 90+3' (pen.)	Report	Cursons 39'; Sutton (yellow card) 59'; McCoulsky (yellow card) 77'	Stadium: Meadow Lane; Attendance: 10,124; Referee: Scott Oldham

22 November 2025 17	Harrogate Town	0–2	Walsall	Harrogate
12:30 GMT	Morris (yellow card) 21'	Report	Kanu 43'; Warrington (yellow card) 58'; Adomah (yellow card) 79'; Farquharson 87'	Stadium: Wetherby Road; Attendance: 3,249; Referee: Aaron Bannister
Note: Fixture was originally scheduled for a 15:00 kick-off, but was rescheduled for live Sky Sports broadcasting.

29 November 2025 18	Barnet	1–1	Harrogate Town	Edgware
15:00 GMT	Assombalonga 23'; Shelton (penalty missed) 43'	Report	O'Connor (yellow card) 45+5'; Muldoon 78'; Fox (yellow card) 90+4'	Stadium: The Hive Stadium; Attendance: 2,187 (145 away); Referee: Elliott Swallow

9 December 2025 19	Harrogate Town	0–2	Accrington Stanley	Harrogate
19:45 GMT	Sutton (yellow card) 20'; Fox (yellow card) 82'	Report	Madden 45', (yellow card) 90+2'; Ward 65'	Stadium: Wetherby Road; Attendance: 2,307 (103 away); Referee: Richard Eley

13 December 2025 20	Cheltenham Town	1–1	Harrogate Town	Harrogate
15:00 GMT	Bickerstaff 73'; Tomkinson (yellow card) 77'; Wilson (yellow card) 79'	Report	McAleny 80' (pen.); Muldoon (yellow card) 90+2'	Stadium: Whaddon Road; Attendance: 4,067; Referee: Michael Barlow

20 December 2025 21	Harrogate Town	0–4	Milton Keynes Dons	Harrogate
15:00 GMT	Evans (yellow card) 14'; Cursons (yellow card) 78'	Report	Collins 15', 23'; Gilbey 29', 75'	Stadium: Wetherby Road; Attendance: 2,923; Referee: Declan Bourne

26 December 2025 22	Salford City	1–0	Harrogate Town	Kersal
15:00 GMT	Longelo (yellow card) 55'; Udoh 75' (pen.)	Report	O'Connor (yellow card) 32'	Stadium: Moor Lane; Attendance: 2,911 (208 away); Referee: Jamie O'Connor

29 December 2025 23	Accrington Stanley	1–0	Harrogate Town	Accrington
19:45 GMT	Whalley 45+1' (pen.); Love (yellow card) 90+5'	Report	Slater (red card) 59'	Stadium: Crown Ground; Attendance: 1,995; Referee: Declan Brown

1 January 2026 24	Harrogate Town	0–2	Tranmere Rovers	Harrogate
15:00 GMT	O'Connor (yellow card) 50'; Morris (yellow card) 90+1'	Report	Turnbull (yellow card) 27'; Norman 73', 90+2'	Stadium: Wetherby Road; Attendance: 3,610

10 January 2026 26	Crewe Alexandra	1–1	Harrogate Town	Crewe
15:00 GMT	Agius 61'; Lawlor (yellow card) 90+1'; Thibaut (yellow card) 90+3'	Report	Jameson (yellow card) 22'; Cursons 90+3'	Stadium: Gresty Road; Attendance: 4,622; Referee: Charles Breakspear

17 January 2026 27	Shrewsbury Town	1–0	Harrogate Town	Shrewsbury
15:00 GMT	Perry 62'; Clucas (yellow card) 90+4'; Marquis (yellow card) 90+4'; McDermott (yellow card) 90+5'	Report	Evans (yellow card) 3' (yellow-red card) 51'; Headman (yellow card) 23'; Smith (yellow card) 70'; O'Connor (yellow card) 89'; Thomson (yellow card) 90+5'; Cass (yellow card) 90+6'	Stadium: New Meadow; Attendance: 4,638; Referee: Peter Wright

24 January 2026 28	Harrogate Town	0–3	Gillingham	Harrogate
15:00 GMT	Falkingham (yellow card) 6'	Report	Masterson 51'; Little 55' (pen.); Vokes 84'; Gale (yellow card) 90+1'	Stadium: Wetherby Road; Attendance: 2,747; Referee: Zac Kennard-Kettle

27 January 2026 29	Harrogate Town	1–2	Fleetwood Town	Harrogate
19:45 GMT	Morris (yellow card) 24'; Headman (yellow card) 75'; Marsh 81'	Report	Evans 45+3'; Davies (yellow card) 56'; Haughey (yellow card) 78'; Bonds (yellow card) 85'; Virtue 90+1'	Stadium: Wetherby Road; Attendance: 1,951; Referee: Oliver Mackey

31 January 2026 30	Crawley Town	2–0	Harrogate Town	Crawley
15:00 GMT	Barker (yellow card) 17'; Anderson 27'; Williams (yellow card) 47'; Flint 66'	Report		Stadium: Broadfield Stadium; Attendance: 3,326; Referee: Tom Reeves

3 February 2026 25	Harrogate Town	0–1	Swindon Town	Harrogate
19:45 GMT	Morris (yellow card) 39'	Report	Clarke (yellow card) 23'; Drinan 84' (pen.)	Stadium: Wetherby Road; Attendance: 2,205; Referee: Ross Martin
Note: Fixture was originally scheduled for 4 January, but it was postponed due to a frozen pitch.

7 February 2026 31	Harrogate Town	2–1	Cambridge United	Harrogate
15:00 GMT	Morris 8'; Sutton 24'; Acquah (yellow card) 30'; Taylor (yellow card) 36'; Evans (yellow card) 74'; Gray (yellow card) 87'	Report	Bennett 29'	Stadium: Wetherby Road; Attendance: 3,370; Referee: Edward Duckworth

14 February 2026 32	Chesterfield	1–1	Harrogate Town	Chesterfield
15:00 GMT	Bonis 12', (yellow card) 57' (yellow-red card) 59'; Pearce (yellow card) 66'	Report	Brenan 84', (yellow card) 86'; Muldoon (yellow card) 89'	Stadium: SMH Group Stadium; Attendance: 7,808 (258 away); Referee: Aaron Farmer

17 February 2026 33	Barrow	0–1	Harrogate Town	Barrow-in-Furness
19:45 GMT	Thompson (yellow card) 90+8'	Report	Taylor 7'; Headman (yellow card) 66'; Heffernan (yellow card) 88'	Stadium: Holker Street; Attendance: 2,386; Referee: Steven Copeland

21 February 2026 34	Harrogate Town	0–0	Bromley	Harrogate
15:00 GMT	Gibson (yellow card) 31'	Report	Jenkinson (yellow card) 84'	Stadium: Wetherby Road; Attendance: 2,822; Referee: Scott Oldham

27 February 2026 35	Harrogate Town	1–1	Cheltenham Town	Harrogate
19:45 GMT	Heffernan 50'	Report	Hutchinson 46'; Tomkinson (yellow card) 74'; Young (yellow card) 90+2'	Stadium: Wetherby Road; Attendance: 3,024; Referee: Ollie Yates
Note: Fixture was originally scheduled for 28 February, but was to the night prior.

7 March 2026 36	Milton Keynes Dons	4–1	Harrogate Town	Denbigh
15:00 GMT	Sanders (yellow card) 26'; Hepburn-Murphy 29'; Offord 45+5'; Collins 51'; Wiles 63'	Report	Brenan 25'	Stadium: Stadium MK; Attendance: 23,456; Referee: Alex Chilowicz

14 March 2026 37	Harrogate Town	0–1	Salford City	Harrogate
12:30 GMT		Report	Borini (yellow card) 84'; Udoh 85'; Turton (yellow card) 90'	Stadium: Wetherby Road; Attendance: 2,861; Referee: James Linington
Note: Fixture was initially scheduled for a 15:00 kick-off, but was brought forward for Sky Sports broadcasting.

17 March 2026 38	Tranmere Rovers	0–3	Harrogate Town	Birkenhead
19:45 GMT	Norman (yellow card) 45'; Whitaker (yellow card) 50'; Kenneh (yellow card) 79'	Report	Smith 9'; Headman 11', 39'; Hill (yellow card) 59'	Stadium: Prenton Park; Referee: Kirsty Dowle

21 March 2026 39	Oldham Athletic	1–0	Harrogate Town	Oldham
15:00 GMT	Leake 60'; Garner (yellow card) 80'; Monthé (yellow card) 87'	Report	Headman (yellow card) 20'; Evans (yellow card) 59'	Stadium: Boundary Park; Attendance: 7,398; Referee: Seb Stockbridge

28 March 2026 40	Harrogate Town	0–2	Notts County	Harrogate
12:30 GMT	Brenan (yellow card) 62'	Report	Jatta 10', 79'	Stadium: Wetherby Road; Attendance: 3,816; Referee: Will Finnie
Note: Fixture was initially scheuled for a 15:00 kick-off, but was brought forward for Sky Sports broadcasting.

3 April 2026 41	Grimsby Town	1–3	Harrogate Town	Cleethorpes
15:00 BST	Burns (yellow card) 30'; Green 39'; Cook (penalty missed) 45+2'	Report	Brenan 21'; Evans 27'; Headman (yellow card) 60'; Morris 80', (yellow card) 90+1'; Gray (yellow card) 90+5'	Stadium: Blundell Park; Attendance: 7,911; Referee: Andrew Humphries

6 April 2026 42	Harrogate Town	2–3	Bristol Rovers	Harrogate
15:00 BST	Taylor 27', 55'; Headman (yellow card) 75'	Report	Forde 50'; Harrison 61', 79' (pen.)	Stadium: Wetherby Road; Attendance: 3,610; Referee: Stephen Parkinson

11 April 2026 43	Newport County	2–1	Harrogate Town	Newport
15:00 BST	Opoku 8'; Thomas 57'; Evans (yellow card) 62'; Crole (yellow card) 83'	Report	Evans 39', (yellow card) 45'	Stadium: Rodney Parade; Attendance: 4,337; Referee: Neil Hair

18 April 2026 44	Harrogate Town	1–0	Colchester United	Harrogate
15:00 BST	Bennett (yellow card) 35'; Evans (yellow card) 46'; Hill (yellow card) 48'; Brenan (yellow card) 76'; Slater 90+9'	Report	Lisbie (yellow card) 87'	Stadium: Wetherby Road; Attendance: 3,030; Referee: Martin Coy

25 April 2026 45	Walsall	0–2	Harrogate Town	Walsall
15:00 BST		Report	McCoulsky 45', 54'	Stadium: Bescot Stadium; Attendance: 6,181; Referee: Ben Speedie

2 May 2026 46	Harrogate Town	1–2	Barnet	Harrogate
15:00 BST	Brenan (yellow card) 13'; McCoulsky (yellow card) 21'; Morris 29' (pen.)	Report	Stead 5'; Tavares (yellow card) 45'; Collinge (yellow card) 46'; Chinedu 82'	Stadium: Wetherby Road; Attendance: 3,952; Referee: Thomas Parsons

=== FA Cup ===
Harrogate were drawn away to Mansfield Town in the first round.

Win Draw Loss Fixtures

1 November 2025 First round	Mansfield Town	3–2	Harrogate Town	Mansfield
15:00 GMT	Hendry 4'; McDonnell (yellow card) 23'; Maris 67', 83'	Report	Duke-McKenna 57'; O'Connor 80', (yellow card) 81'	Stadium: Field Mill; Attendance: 3,301 (155 away fans); Referee: Wayne Cartmel

=== EFL Cup ===
Harrogate were drawn at home to Lincoln City in the first round.

Win Draw Loss Fixtures

12 August 2025 First round	Harrogate Town	1–3	Lincoln City	Harrogate
19:45 BST	Taylor 90+5'	Report	Moylan 29'; Bayliss (yellow card) 48'; Draper 60'; Street 68'	Stadium: Wetherby Road; Attendance: 2,119; Referee: Zac Kennard-Kettle

=== EFL Trophy ===
Harrogate were drawn against Huddersfield Town, Mansfield Town and Newcastle United U21 in the group stage. After the winning group, Town were drawn at home to Blackpool in the round of 32. and away to Stockport County in the round of 16.

Pos	Div	Team	Pld	W	PW	PL	L	GF	GA	GD	Pts	Qualification
1	L2	Harrogate Town	3	3	0	0	0	5	1	+4	9	Advance to Round 2
2	L1	Huddersfield Town	3	2	0	0	1	9	4	+5	6	Advance to Round 2
3	ACA	Newcastle United U21	3	0	1	0	2	5	11	−6	2	
4	L1	Mansfield Town	3	0	0	1	2	3	6	−3	1	

Source: EFL

Win Draw Loss Fixtures

9 September 2025 Nor. Group F	Mansfield Town	0–1	Harrogate Town	Mansfield
19:45 BST		Report	Bennett 2' (pen.); Evans (yellow card) 31'; Faulkner (yellow card) 51'; Hill (yellow card) 90+7'	Stadium: Field Mill; Attendance: 1,275 (59 away); Referee: Peter Wright

30 September 2025 Nor. Group F	Harrogate Town	1–0	Huddersfield Town	Harrogate
19:00 BST	Taylor 11'	Report	Wallace (yellow card) 32'; Charles (yellow card) 48'; Smith-Sway (yellow card) 82'	Stadium: Wetherby Road; Attendance: 2,262 (877 away); Referee: Zac Kennard-Kettle

11 November 2025 Nor. Group F	Harrogate Town	3–1	Newcastle United U21	Harrogate
19:00 GMT	Taylor 12'; Cursons 64', 78'; Faulkner (yellow card) 85'	Report	Harrison 45+4'	Stadium: Wetherby Road; Attendance: 1,469; Referee: Richard Aspinall

2 December 2025 Round of 32	Harrogate Town	4–2	Blackpool	Harrogate
19:00 GMT	Smith 7'; O'Connor 13'; Muldoon 17', 84'	Report	Hansson 45'; Evans (yellow card) 51'; Fletcher 73'	Stadium: Wetherby Road; Attendance: 1,372; Referee: Wayne Cartmel

13 January 2026 Round of 16	Stockport County	2–1	Harrogate Town	Edgeley
19:00 GMT	Stokes 77', 90+4'	Report	Cursons 49'	Stadium: Edgeley Park; Attendance: 1,442 (111 away); Referee: James Oldham

== Statistics ==
=== Appearances and goals ===
Players with no appearances are not included on the list; italics indicate a loaned in player

No.	Pos	Nat	Player	Total		League Two		FA Cup		EFL Cup		EFL Trophy	
No.	Pos	Nat	Player	Apps	Goals	Apps	Goals	Apps	Goals	Apps	Goals	Apps	Goals
1	GK	(England) ENG	Mark Oxley	12	0	7+1	0	1+0	0	1+0	0	2+0	0
2	DF	(England) ENG	Zico Asare	20	0	10+4	0	1+0	0	1+0	0	3+1	0
3	DF	(Republic of Ireland) IRL	Jacob Slater	36	0	32+0	0	1+0	0	0+0	0	3+0	0
4	MF	(England) ENG	Jack Evans	48	3	43+0	3	1+0	0	0+1	0	3+0	0
5	DF	(England) ENG	Tom Bradbury	10	0	8+1	0	0+0	0	0+0	0	1+0	0
6	DF	(England) ENG	Warren Burrell	30	1	22+3	1	0+0	0	0+1	0	3+1	0
7	MF	(England) ENG	George Thomson	14	0	3+10	0	0+0	0	0+0	0	0+1	0
8	MF	(England) ENG	Bryn Morris	48	3	40+2	3	1+0	0	1+0	0	2+2	0
9	FW	(England) ENG	Shawn McCoulsky	29	3	14+9	3	0+1	0	0+1	0	1+3	0
10	FW	(England) ENG	Mason Bennett	14	1	4+7	0	0+0	0	0+0	0	3+0	1
11	MF	(Guyana) GUY	Stephen Duke-McKenna	31	6	17+11	5	1+0	1	1+0	0	1+0	0
12	FW	(England) ENG	Emile Acquah	20	0	13+7	0	0+0	0	0+0	0	0+0	0
13	GK	(New Zealand) NZL	Henry Gray	19	0	17+1	0	0+0	0	0+0	0	1+0	0
14	FW	(England) ENG	Conor McAleny	27	3	7+14	3	0+0	0	0+1	0	2+3	0
15	DF	(Republic of Ireland) IRL	Anthony O'Connor	32	2	25+2	0	1+0	1	0+0	0	3+1	1
16	DF	(England) ENG	Chanse Headman	16	2	15+1	2	0+0	0	0+0	0	0+0	0
17	MF	(England) ENG	Levi Sutton	19	0	9+6	0	0+0	0	0+0	0	3+1	0
18	FW	(England) ENG	Jack Muldoon	34	7	19+11	5	1+0	0	0+0	0	3+0	2
19	MF	(Wales) WAL	Thomas Hill	11	0	6+2	0	0+0	0	1+0	0	2+0	0
20	DF	(England) ENG	Bobby Faulkner	26	0	12+9	0	1+0	0	1+0	0	2+1	0
21	MF	(England) ENG	Ellis Taylor	33	7	23+5	4	1+0	0	0+1	1	2+1	2
22	FW	(England) ENG	Reece Smith	52	3	43+2	2	1+0	0	1+0	0	3+2	1
23	FW	(England) ENG	Emmerson Sutton	9	1	6+3	1	0+0	0	0+0	0	0+0	0
24	DF	(England) ENG	Lewis Cass	28	0	17+8	0	0+0	0	1+0	0	2+0	0
26	DF	(England) ENG	Grant Horton	3	0	2+0	0	0+0	0	0+0	0	1+0	0
27	MF	(England) ENG	Ben Fox	20	0	10+5	0	0+0	0	1+0	0	4+0	0
29	MF	(England) ENG	Lucas Barnes	1	0	0+1	0	0+0	0	0+0	0	0+0	0
30	DF	(England) ENG	Liam Gibson	19	0	16+1	0	0+0	0	1+0	0	1+0	0
31	DF	(Republic of Ireland) IRL	Cathal Heffernan	21	1	21+0	1	0+0	0	0+0	0	0+0	0
33	GK	(England) ENG	Sam Waller	1	0	0+1	0	0+0	0	0+0	0	0+0	0
37	FW	(England) ENG	Aiden Marsh	4	1	2+2	1	0+0	0	0+0	0	0+0	0
38	MF	(England) ENG	Tobias Brenan	15	2	8+7	2	0+0	0	0+0	0	0+0	0
44	MF	(England) ENG	Josh Falkingham	4	0	1+2	0	0+0	0	0+0	0	1+0	0
Players who featured but departed the club during the season:
23	DF	(England) ENG	Kyle Jameson	5	0	4+1	0	0+0	0	0+0	0	0+0	0
25	FW	(England) ENG	Tom Cursons	16	5	6+6	2	0+0	0	1+0	0	1+2	3
31	GK	(England) ENG	James Belshaw	24	0	22+0	0	0+0	0	0+0	0	2+0	0

=== Disciplinary record ===
Rank	No.	Pos.	Player	League Two			FA Cup			EFL Cup			EFL Trophy			Total		
Rank	No.	Pos.	Player	Yellow card	(yellow card) (yellow-red card)	Red card	Yellow card	(yellow card) (yellow-red card)	Red card	Yellow card	(yellow card) (yellow-red card)	Red card	Yellow card	(yellow card) (yellow-red card)	Red card	Yellow card	(yellow card) (yellow-red card)	Red card
1	4	MF	(England) Jack Evans	9	1	0	0	0	0	0	0	0	1	0	0	10	1	0
2	8	MF	(England) Bryn Morris	8	0	0	0	0	0	0	0	0	0	0	0	8	0	0
2	15	DF	(Republic of Ireland) Anthony O'Connor	7	0	0	1	0	0	0	0	0	0	0	0	8	0	0
4	16	DF	(England) Chanse Headman	6	0	0	0	0	0	0	0	0	0	0	0	6	0	0
5	3	DF	(Republic of Ireland) Jacob Slater	2	0	1	0	0	0	0	0	0	0	0	0	2	0	1
6	18	FW	(England) Jack Muldoon	4	0	0	0	0	0	0	0	0	0	0	0	4	0	0
6	19	DF	(Wales) Thomas Hill	3	0	0	0	0	0	0	0	0	1	0	0	4	0	0
6	38	MF	(England) Tobias Brenan	4	0	0	0	0	0	0	0	0	0	0	0	4	0	0
9	6	DF	(England) Warren Burrell	3	0	0	0	0	0	0	0	0	0	0	0	3	0	0
9	9	FW	(England) Shawn McCoulsky	3	0	0	0	0	0	0	0	0	0	0	0	3	0	0
9	21	FW	(England) Ellis Taylor	3	0	0	0	0	0	0	0	0	0	0	0	3	0	0
9	27	MF	(England) Ben Fox	3	0	0	0	0	0	0	0	0	0	0	0	3	0	0
13	11	FW	(Guyana) Stephen Duke-McKenna	2	0	0	0	0	0	0	0	0	0	0	0	2	0	0
13	13	GK	(New Zealand) Henry Gray	2	0	0	0	0	0	0	0	0	0	0	0	2	0	0
13	17	MF	(England) Levi Sutton	2	0	0	0	0	0	0	0	0	0	0	0	2	0	0
13	20	DF	(England) Bobby Faulkner	0	0	0	0	0	0	0	0	0	2	0	0	2	0	0
17	2	DF	(England) Zico Asare	1	0	0	0	0	0	0	0	0	0	0	0	1	0	0
17	5	DF	(England) Tom Bradbury	1	0	0	0	0	0	0	0	0	0	0	0	1	0	0
17	7	MF	(England) George Thomson	1	0	0	0	0	0	0	0	0	0	0	0	1	0	0
17	10	FW	(England) Mason Bennett	1	0	0	0	0	0	0	0	0	0	0	0	1	0	0
17	12	FW	(England) Emile Acquah	1	0	0	0	0	0	0	0	0	0	0	0	1	0	0
17	14	FW	(England) Conor McAleny	1	0	0	0	0	0	0	0	0	0	0	0	1	0	0
17	22	FW	(England) Reece Smith	1	0	0	0	0	0	0	0	0	0	0	0	1	0	0
17	23	DF	(England) Kyle Jameson	1	0	0	0	0	0	0	0	0	0	0	0	1	0	0
17	24	DF	(England) Lewis Cass	1	0	0	0	0	0	0	0	0	0	0	0	1	0	0
17	25	FW	(England) Tom Cursons	1	0	0	0	0	0	0	0	0	0	0	0	1	0	0
17	30	DF	(England) Liam Gibson	1	0	0	0	0	0	0	0	0	0	0	0	1	0	0
17	31	DF	(Republic of Ireland) Cathal Heffernan	1	0	0	0	0	0	0	0	0	0	0	0	1	0	0
44	MF	(England) Josh Falkingham	1	0	0	0	0	0	0	0	0	0	0	0	1	0	0	
Totals				74	1	1	1	0	0	0	0	0	4	0	0	79	1	1
