= Connor Barrett =

Connor Barrett is the name of:

- Connor Barrett (artist)
- Connor Barrett (footballer)
