= Zico Asare =

English footballer (born 2001)

Personal information
- Full name: Zico Kukuu Asare
- Date of birth: 11 April 2001 (age 25)
- Place of birth: London, England
- Height: 1.76 m (5 ft 9 in)
- Position: Defender

Team information
- Current team: Woking
- Number: 2

Youth career
- 2009–2020: Fulham

Senior career*
Years	Team	Apps	(Gls)
2021–2022	Oxford City	41	(0)
2022–2024	Maidenhead United	86	(0)
2024–2026	Harrogate Town	40	(1)
2026–	Woking	6	(0)

International career
2016	England U15	4	(0)
2016–2017	England U16	5	(0)
2024	England C	1	(0)
- * Club domestic league appearances and goals as of 19:28, 28 October 2026 (UTC)

Zico Kukuu Asare (born 11 April 2001) is an English professional footballer who plays for Woking, as a defender.

== Club career ==
Born in London, Asare joined Fulham aged 8, remaining with the club until the end of the 2019–20 season. After a year out of football, he signed for Oxford City in June 2021, moving to Maidenhead United a season later.

He signed for Harrogate Town in July 2024. On 15 May 2026, Harrogate announced the player would be released in the summer once his contract had expired.

On 30 May 2026, it was announced that Asare would join Woking on a two-year deal, upon the expiry of his contract at Harrogate Town.

== International career ==
Born in England, Asare is of Ghanaian descent. He has played for England at under-15 and under-16 level, and later at C level.

== Career statistics ==
As of match played 10 November 2026

Appearances and goals by club, season and competition
Club	Season	League			FA Cup		League Cup		Other		Total	
Club	Season	Division	Apps	Goals	Apps	Goals	Apps	Goals	Apps	Goals	Apps	Goals
Oxford City	2021–22	National League South	41	0	0	0	—		1 (Note: Appearances in FA Trophy)	0	42	0
Maidenhead United	2022–23	National League	43	0	1	0	—		2	0	46	0
Maidenhead United	2023–24	National League	43	0	2	0	—		1	0	46	0
Maidenhead United	Total		86	0	3	0	0	0	3	0	92	0
Harrogate Town	2024–25	League Two	26	1	3	0	2	0	3 (Note: Appearance(s) in the EFL Trophy.)	0	34	1
Harrogate Town	2025–26	League Two	14	0	1	0	1	0	4	0	20	0
Harrogate Town	Total		40	1	4	0	3	0	7	0	54	1
Woking	2026–27	National League	6	0	0	0	—		2 (Note: One appearance in National League Cup, one appearance in Surrey Senior Cup)	0	8	0
Career total			173	1	7	0	3	0	13	0	196	1
