= Warren Burrell =

English footballer

Personal information
- Full name: Warren Matthew Burrell
- Date of birth: 3 June 1990 (age 36)
- Place of birth: Sheffield, England
- Height: 5 ft 10 in (1.78 m)
- Positions: Defender; midfielder

Team information
- Current team: Harrogate Town
- Number: 6

Senior career*
Years	Team	Apps	(Gls)
2008–2009	Mansfield Town	1	(0)
2009	Harrogate Town	0	(0)
2011–2015	Sheffield		
2015	Leek Town		
2015–2016	Buxton		
2016–	Harrogate Town	378	(19)
- * Club domestic league appearances and goals as of 14:30, 19 May 2026 (UTC)

Warren Matthew Burrell (born 3 June 1990) is an English professional footballer who plays as a defender for National League club Harrogate Town.

== Career ==
Burrell began his career with Mansfield Town, making his debut at the age of 17. After being released aged 19, he signed for Harrogate Town. In October 2009 he was jailed for grievous bodily harm, serving two years of a four-year prison sentence. After his release, he played for Sheffield, Leek Town, and Buxton. He re-signed for Harrogate in January 2016.

On 29 May 2025, the club announced he had signed a new two-year deal.

== Career statistics ==
As of end of 2025–26 season

Appearances and goals by club, season and competition
Club	Season	League			FA Cup		League Cup		Other		Total	
Club	Season	Division	Apps	Goals	Apps	Goals	Apps	Goals	Apps	Goals	Apps	Goals
Harrogate Town	2015–16	National League North	16	5	0	0	—		0	0	16	5
Harrogate Town	2016–17	National League North	39	5	1	0	—		2 (Note: Appearances in FA Trophy)	0	42	5
Harrogate Town	2017–18	National League North	42	0	1	0	—		4	2	47	2
Harrogate Town	2018–19	National League	45	4	0	0	—		4 (Note: Three appearances in FA Trophy, one appearance in National League play-offs)	0	49	4
Harrogate Town	2019–20	National League	34	0	2	0	—		3 (Note: One appearance in FA Trophy, two appearances in National League play-offs)	0	39	0
Harrogate Town	2020–21	League Two	43	0	2	0	2	0	3 (Note: Appearances in EFL Trophy)	0	50	0
Harrogate Town	2021–22	League Two	45	2	3	0	0	0	5	0	53	2
Harrogate Town	2022–23	League Two	34	1	2	0	1	0	2	0	39	1
Harrogate Town	2023–24	League Two	28	1	1	0	2	0	2	0	33	1
Harrogate Town	2024–25	League Two	27	0	2	0	2	0	3	1	34	1
Harrogate Town	2025–26	League Two	25	1	0	0	1	0	4	0	30	1
Career total			378	19	14	0	9	0	36	3	432	22

== Honours ==
Harrogate Town

- National League play-offs: 2020
- FA Trophy: 2019–20
