= Reece Smith =

English footballer (born 2002)

Personal information
- Full name: Reece Andrew Smith
- Date of birth: 28 April 2002 (age 24)
- Place of birth: Reading, England
- Height: 1.85 m (6 ft 1 in)
- Positions: Left winger; attacking midfielder

Team information
- Current team: Walsall
- Number: 11

Youth career
- Ashridge Park
- Eldon Celtic
- Maidenhead United

Senior career*
Years	Team	Apps	(Gls)
2019–2025	Maidenhead United	158	(24)
2019–2020	→ Banstead Athletic (loan)	12	(0)
2025–2026	Harrogate Town	45	(2)
2026–	Walsall	8	(2)

International career
2024	England C	1	(0)
- * Club domestic league appearances and goals as of 15:16, 27 July 2026 (UTC)

Reece Andrew Smith (born 28 April 2002) is an English professional footballer who plays as a left wing or attacking midfielder for EFL League Two club Walsall.

== Club career ==
Born in leeds, Smith played youth football locally for Ashridge Park and Eldon Celtic before joining Maidenhead United. After making his debut in December 2019, and playing out on loan at Banstead Athletic, Smith signed his first contract with Maidenhead in October 2020. He went on to score 22 goals in 175 games for the Magpies before joining Harrogate Town on a two-year deal in June 2025. On 28 July 2026, he joined Walsall on a three-year deal for an undisclosed fee.

== International career ==
Smith played for England C against Wales in March 2024.

== Career statistics ==
As of end of 2025-26 season

Appearances and goals by club, season and competition
Club	Season	League			FA Cup		League Cup		Other		Total	
Club	Season	Division	Apps	Goals	Apps	Goals	Apps	Goals	Apps	Goals	Apps	Goals
Maidenhead United	2019–20	National League	0	0	0	0	0	0	2 (Note: Appearances in Berks & Bucks Senior Cup)	0	2	0
Maidenhead United	2020–21	National League	6	1	0	0	0	0	0	0	6	1
Maidenhead United	2021–22	National League	31	1	2	0	0	0	0	0	33	1
Maidenhead United	2022–23	National League	38	5	2	0	0	0	3 (Note: Appearances in FA Trophy)	0	43	5
Maidenhead United	2023–24	National League	40	11	2	0	0	0	1	0	43	11
Maidenhead United	2024–25	National League	43	6	3	1	0	0	2 (Note: One appearance in FA Trophy, one appearance in National League Cup)	0	48	7
Maidenhead United	Total		158	24	9	1	0	0	8	0	175	25
Banstead Athletic (loan)	2019–20	CCL Premier Division	12	0	0	0	0	0	0	0	12	0
Harrogate Town	2025–26	League Two	45	2	1	0	1	0	5 (Note: Appearances in EFL Trophy)	1	52	3
Career total			215	26	10	1	1	0	13	1	239	28
