= Chanse Headman =

English footballer

Personal information
- Full name: Chanse Allan Headman
- Date of birth: 3 June 2005 (age 21)
- Place of birth: Chelsea, England
- Height: 1.92 m (6 ft 4 in)
- Position: Central defender

Team information
- Current team: Bromley
- Number: 2

Youth career
- BHFC Battersea
- Kingstonian
- Sutton United
- Hanwell Town
- Leatherhead
- –2023: Walton & Hersham
- 2023–2025: Brentford

Senior career*
Years	Team	Apps	(Gls)
2025–2026	Brentford	0	(0)
2025–2026	→ Maidenhead United (loan)	5	(1)
2026	Harrogate Town	16	(2)
2026–	Bromley	3	(0)
- * Club domestic league appearances and goals as of 15:30, 31 August 2026 (UTC)

Chanse Allan Headman (born 3 June 2005) is an English professional footballer who plays as a central defender for EFL League One club Bromley.

Headman is a product of a number of non-League youth systems and began his professional career with Brentford in 2023. After three years with the club's B team, he began his senior career with Harrogate Town in 2026. After the club's relegation to non-League football, Headman transferred back to the EFL with Bromley.

== Career ==
=== Brentford ===
Headman began his youth career at BHFC Battersea and progressed through the youth systems of non-League clubs Kingstonian, Sutton United, Hanwell Town, Leatherhead and Walton & Hersham. He transferred to the U18 team at Premier League club Brentford on 1 February 2023 and signed a six-month professional contract, with the option of a further year. For the remainder of the 2022–23 season, Headman trained full-time with the B team and played for the U18 team. The one-year option on his contract was triggered at the end of the 2022–23 season. At the end of the 2023–24 season, Headman signed a new one-year contract, with the option of a further year. He was an unused substitute during a 2024–25 first team pre-season friendly. Headman made 37 appearances during the 2024–25 B team season and was part of the Professional Development League-winning squad.

Headman was retained for the 2025–26 season and saw his playing time increase. He made 19 appearances prior to joining National League South club Maidenhead United on a one-month loan on 5 December 2025. He made five appearances and scored one goal. On 15 January 2026, Headman transferred out of Brentford permanently.

=== Harrogate Town ===
On 15 January 2026, Headman signed an 18-month contract with League Two club Harrogate Town on a free transfer. He made 16 appearances and scored two goals during the remainder of the 2025–26 season, which culminated in relegation to the National League. Headman transferred out of the club in July 2026.

=== Bromley ===
On 10 July 2026, Headman transferred to League One club Bromley and signed an undisclosed-length contract for an undisclosed fee.

== Personal life ==
Headman attended The Fulham Boys School. He is a football referee.

== Career statistics ==
As of match played 8 August 2026

Appearances and goals by club, season and competition
Club	Season	League			FA Cup		EFL Cup		Other		Total	
Club	Season	Division	Apps	Goals	Apps	Goals	Apps	Goals	Apps	Goals	Apps	Goals
Brentford	2025–26	Premier League	0	0	0	0	0	0	―		0	0
Maidenhead United (loan)	2025–26	National League South	5	1	―		―		―		5	1
Harrogate Town	2025–26	League Two	16	2	―		―		―		16	2
Bromley	2026–27	League One	0	0	0	0	1	0	0	0	1	0
Career total			21	3	0	0	1	0	0	0	22	3
