= Ellis Taylor =

English footballer (born 2003)

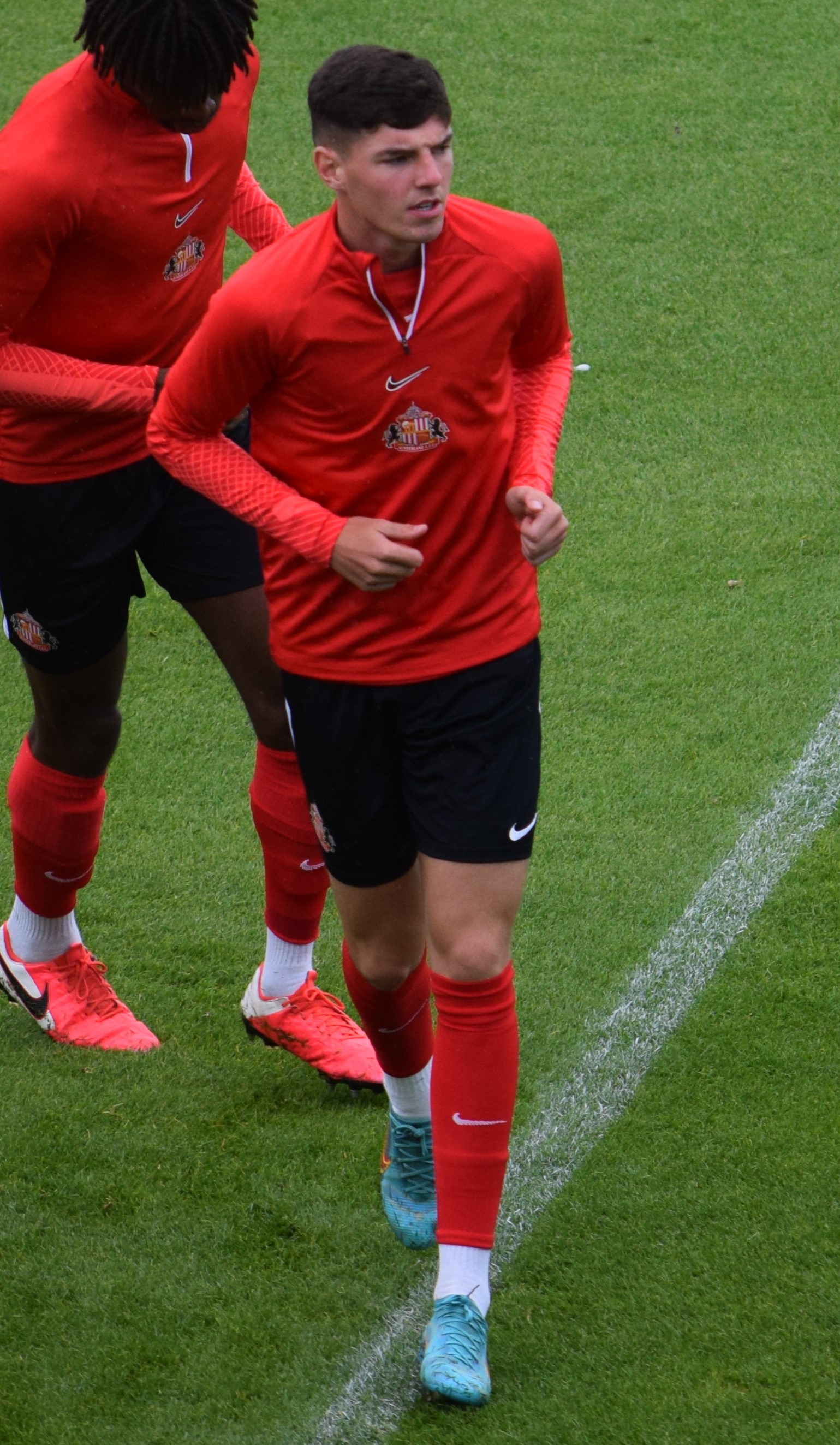
- Taylor warming up for Sunderland in 2022

Personal information
- Full name: Ellis Taylor
- Date of birth: 14 April 2003 (age 23)
- Place of birth: Hartlepool, England
- Height: 1.82 m (6 ft 0 in)
- Position: Midfielder

Team information
- Current team: Harrogate Town
- Number: 21

Youth career
- 2012–2021: Sunderland

Senior career*
Years	Team	Apps	(Gls)
2021–2024	Sunderland	0	(0)
2022–2023	→ Hartlepool United (loan)	4	(0)
2024–	Harrogate Town	74	(14)

International career
2017	England U15	2	(0)
- * Club domestic league appearances and goals as of 20:03, 31 October 2026 (UTC)

Ellis Taylor (born 14 April 2003) is an English professional footballer who plays as a midfielder for National League club Harrogate Town.

== Playing career ==
Taylor played for Seaton Carew before joining the academy at Sunderland at the age of nine following a series of trials. He won two caps for the England U15 squad in December 2017. He signed his first professional contract in June 2021, which would keep him at the Stadium of Light until 2024. Taylor made his first-team debut on 10 August 2021, in a 2–1 win at Port Vale in an EFL Cup first round fixture.

On 28 July 2022, Taylor signed for his hometown club Hartlepool United on a season-long loan. Taylor's loan was cut short on 1 January 2023.

On 17 May 2024, Sunderland announced the player would be released in the summer when his contract expired.

On 16 July 2024, Taylor signed for League Two club Harrogate Town on a two-year contract following a successful trial period. Taylor scored his first senior goal in a 3–3 draw at Accrington Stanley on 17 August 2024. He followed up his successful start to his Harrogate career with goals in Yorkshire derbies against Doncaster Rovers and Bradford City.

== Statistics ==
As of match played 31 October 2026

Appearances and goals by club, season and competition
Club	Season	League			FA Cup		EFL Cup		Other		Total	
Club	Season	Division	Apps	Goals	Apps	Goals	Apps	Goals	Apps	Goals	Apps	Goals
Sunderland	2021–22	League One	0	0	0	0	1	0	3 (Note: Appearances in EFL Trophy)	0	4	0
Sunderland	2022–23	Championship	0	0	0	0	0	0	0	0	0	0
Sunderland	2023–24	Championship	0	0	0	0	1	0	0	0	0	0
Sunderland	Total		0	0	0	0	2	0	3	0	5	0
Hartlepool United (loan)	2022–23	League Two	4	0	1	0	1	0	2	0	8	0
Harrogate Town	2024–25	League Two	36	7	2	0	2	0	2	0	42	7
Harrogate Town	2025–26	League Two	28	4	1	0	1	1	3	2	33	7
Harrogate Town	2026–27	National League	10	3	2	2	0	0	0	0	12	5
Harrogate Town	Total		74	14	5	2	3	1	5	2	87	19
Career total			78	14	6	2	6	1	10	2	100	19
