= Oliver O'Connor Barrett =

British artist

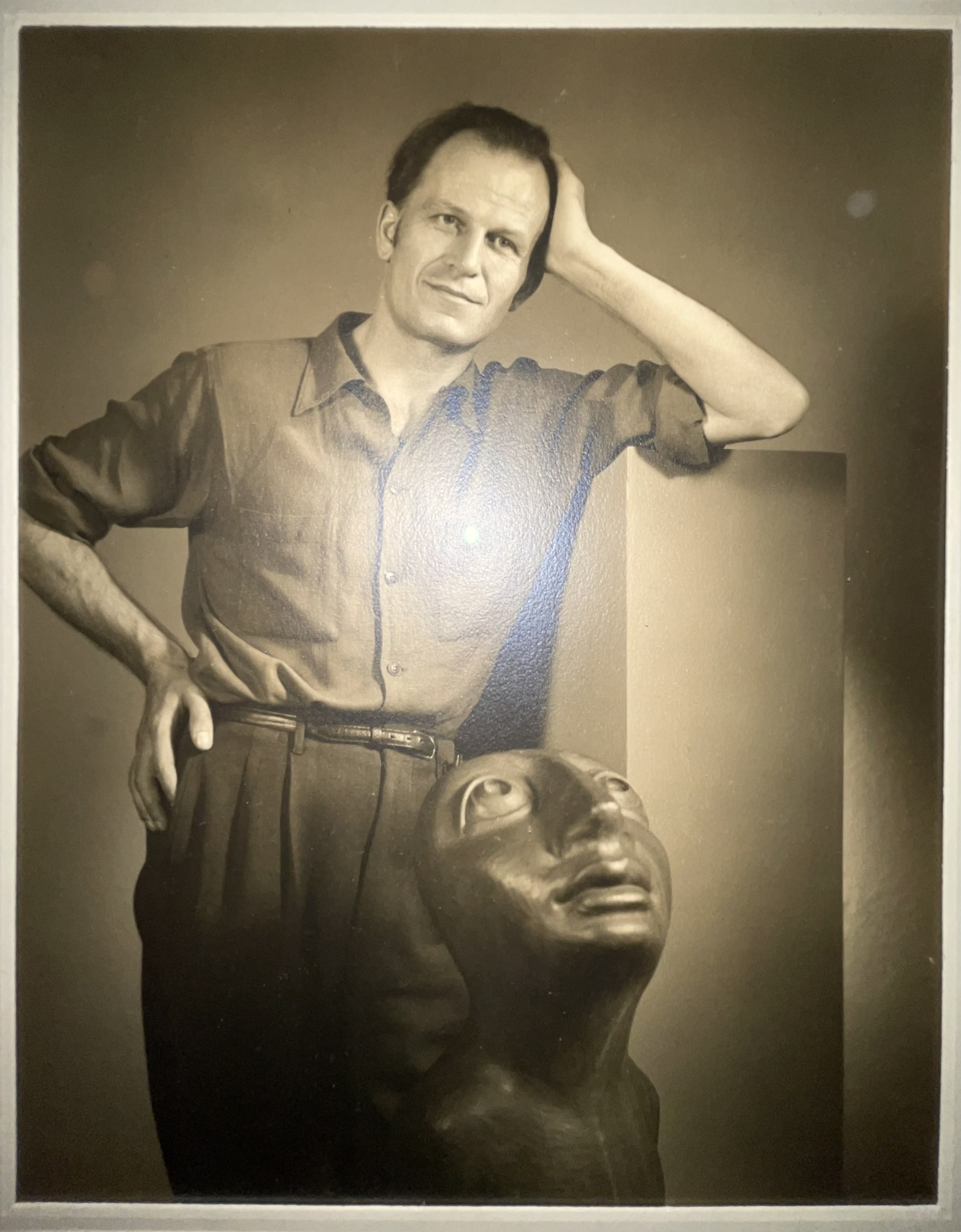
- Studio photograph with sculpture, c. 1950
- Born: 17 January 1908; Eltham, London, England
- Died: July 1987 (aged 79); Trawsfynydd, Wales
- Education: Fircroft College
- Known for: Sculpture; Education; Illustration

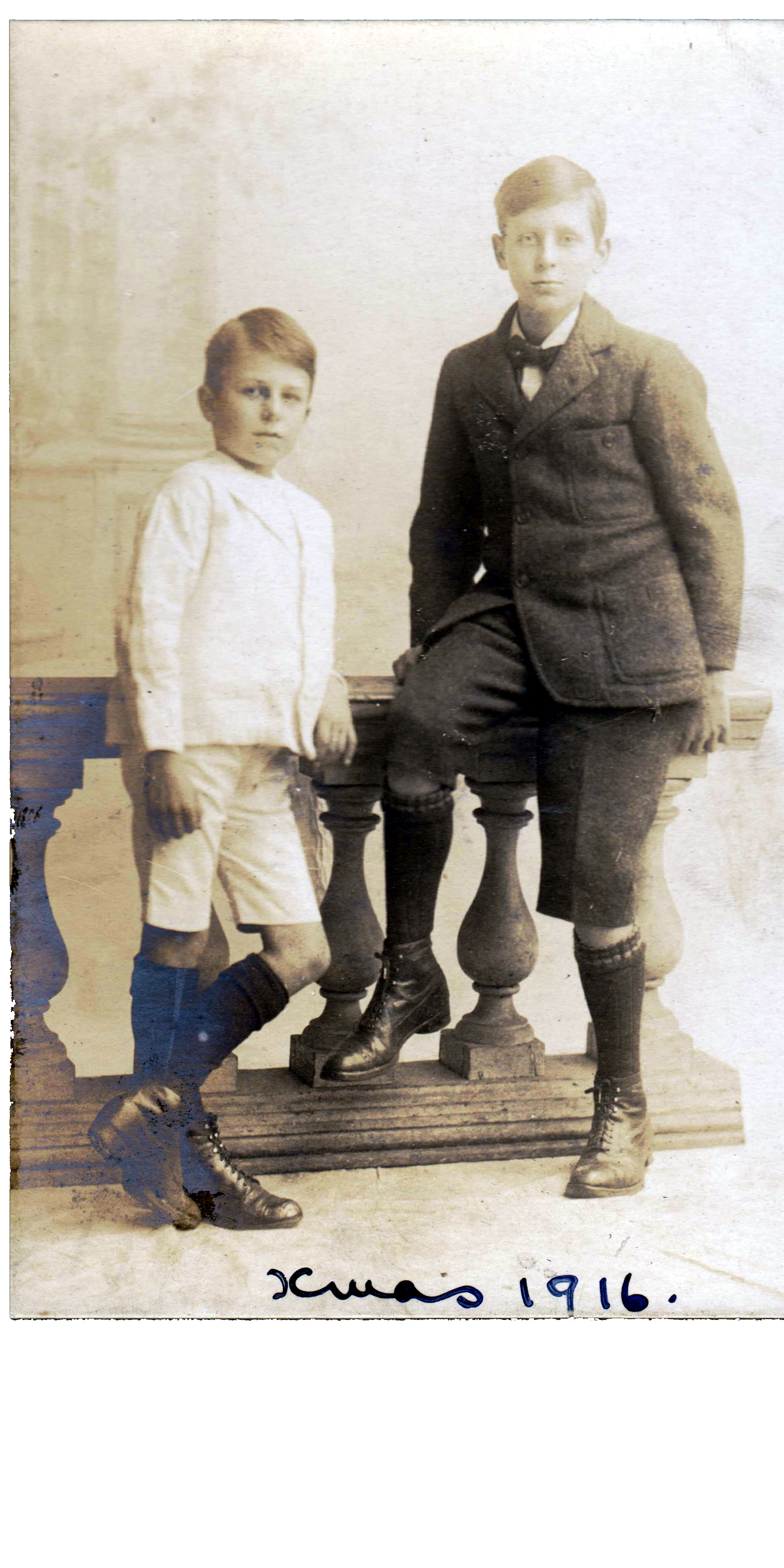
Photograph of Connor Barrett (left) and his brother Alec at Xmas 1916

Oliver O'Connor Barrett (17 January 1908 – July 1987), better known as Connor Barrett, was a British sculptor, painter, graphic artist, educator, poet and composer. Most of his adult career and recognition was in the United States.

== Life and art career ==
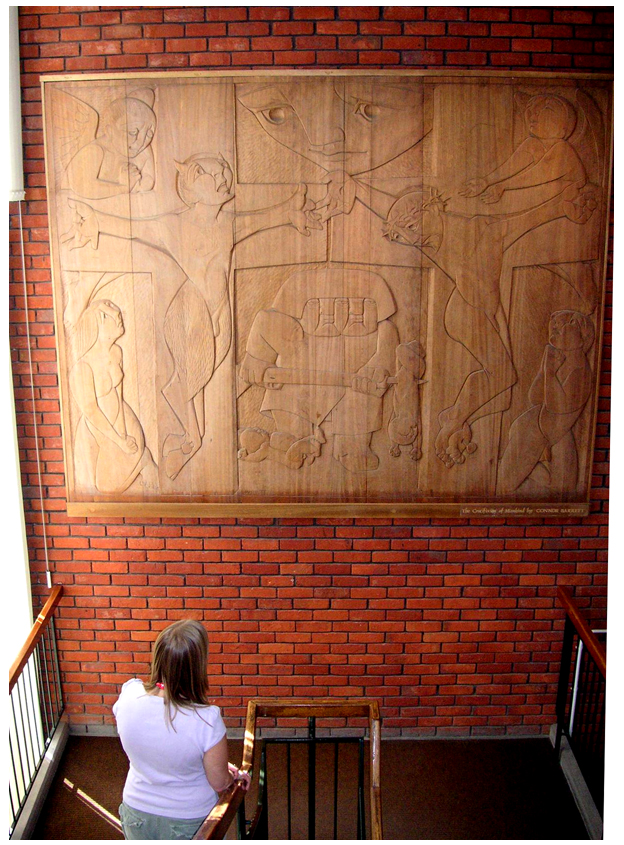
Crucifixion of Mankind, 1961

Oliver O'Connor Barrett was born in Eltham, London, England on 17 January 1908. He studied at Fircroft College in England but was largely self-taught as a sculptor. In 1933, Barrett exhibited at the Royal Academy. In 1937-38 he carved a panel, The Temptation of St. Anthony and fifteen keystones for a block of flats, called Viceroy Close, in Edgbaston, Birmingham. The work was designed and executed in the almost cartoonish manner that was to become one of the several styles that Barrett was comfortable in.

In 1940 he moved to the United States where he settled with his family in New York City. In 1942 he exhibited at the New Orleans Art Center, in 1945 at the Pennsylvania Academy of the Fine Arts and in 1946, 1948 and 1950 at Audubon Artists.

Barrett was one of the sculptors who exhibited at the 3rd Sculpture International, sponsored by the Fairmount Park Art Association and held at the Philadelphia Museum of Art in 1949.

=== Teaching appointments ===
- 1940 - 42 Sculpture Instructor at Putney School, Vermont.
- 1942 - 44 Professor of Sculpture and Drawing, Tulane University, New Orleans.
- 1947 - 52 Sculpture Instructor, Cooper Union Art School, New York.
- 1952 - 53 Sculpture Instructor, Brooklyn Museum Art School and Cooper Union.
- Instructor in Sculpture and Painting, People's Art Center, Museum of Modern Art, New York.
- 1954 - 62 Director Of Sculpture Department, Palm Beach Art Institute.

=== One-man exhibitions ===
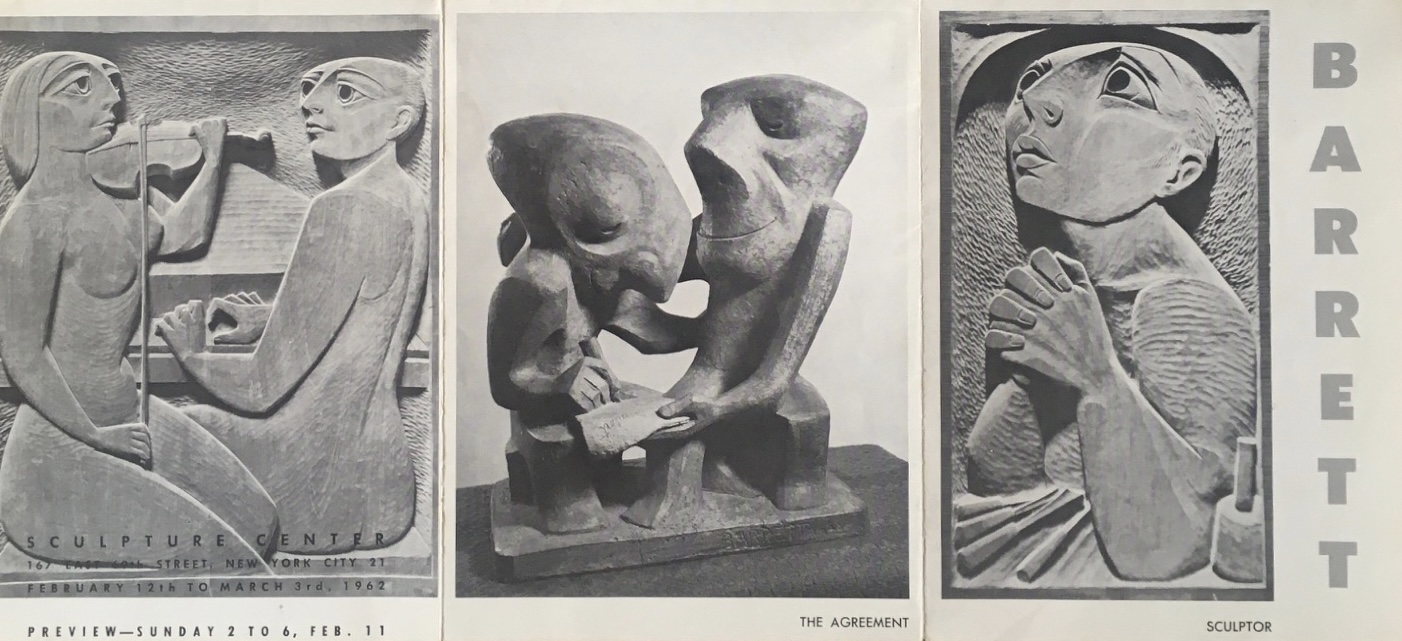
Exhibition Catalogue from 1962 Exhibition in New York by Connor Barrett

- 1934 London
- 1934 Birmingham
- 1940 New York
- 1943 New Orleans
- 1944 New York
- 1946 New York
- 1951 Potsdam, N.Y.
- 1959 Palm Beach
- 1962 Retrospective -Sculpture Centre
- 1962 Whitney Museum, N.Y.
- 1962 Williamsburg, Va.
- 1962 Albany Museum,
- 1963 New York, World Fair

== Sculpture Continuum ==
In 1962, as the 1964 New York World's Fair was being planned, Barrett was commissioned to create the Sculpture Continuum Playground. In his book Myself Emerging it states that the "CONTINUUM principle was invented and patented by Barrett in America. Other designs based on the principle are available, adapted to various environmental situations." It is unclear as to what became of the playground following the end of the fair in 1965. Regarding this work, Barrett quotes a letter from the eminent art historian Herbert Read in which Read states, "You have given a new spacial development to the Art of sculpture."

The Sculpture Continuum playground was disassembled and stored for a while under the Van Wyck Expressway after the World's Fair closed in 1965, next to the disassembled World's Fair Pavilion (a geodesic dome). Eventually the dome was reassembled nearby and now serves as the Bird Aviary for the Queens Zoo. The Sculpture Continuum was acquired by Long Island's Valley Stream Union Free School District (District 13), where it was installed as playground equipment at Willow Road Elementary. After many years of outdoor use, it was moved into storage by the school district. Eventually at least three of the best pieces, including the elephant and the giraffe, were returned to district elementary schools for outdoor display (but not playground use). The elephant is displayed in front of Willow Road Elementary, and another piece is believed to be at Dever Elementary.

In New York, Barrett taught as Instructor of Sculpture at the Cooper Union Art School and the Museum of Modern Art. In the ensuing years he lived in several American cities including New Orleans, Louisiana and Palm Beach, Florida, where he served as head of the art department at the Norton School of Art before returning to Great Britain and retiring to the Welsh valley of Cwm Prysor, near Trawsfynydd. He died there in July 1989.

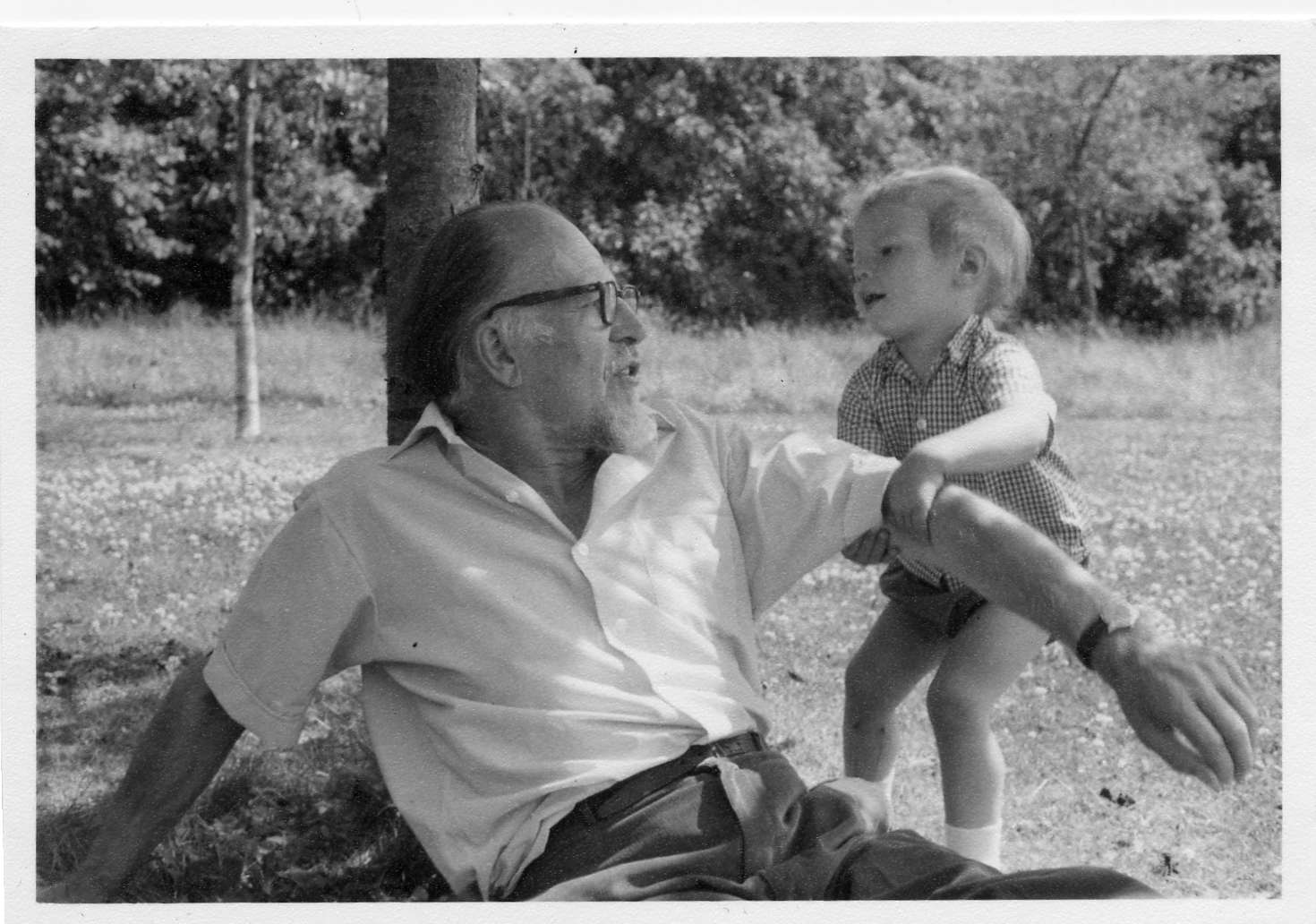
Connor Barrett in 1967-68 with his grandson Ben Page

Some of his artwork is in the collection of Birmingham Museum & Art Gallery, in the UK. His papers are in the collection of the Smithsonian Archives of American Art.

== Myself Emerging ==
In 1980 Barrett published the book Myself Emerging, consisting primarily of selections of his poetry interspersed with photographs of his sculpture. The book is prefaced with the statement, "With age, my development as a man, and perhaps as a poet, seems to have accelerated. Feelings are more intense and, becoming more open. I receive their full impact, whether joy or pain. Nor do I feel the need to justify or make them consistent." An intensely personal side of Barrett is revealed in his early poems. First Love (1927) finds him longing to be "crushed beneath a last caress of your all too-powerful hand", while in Lonely One, written during World War II, the author wants to grieve, but is restrained from doing so by those who dictate "KEEP A STIFF UPPER LIP AND DON'T GIVE WAY! DON'T FEEL DON'T THINK DON'T BROOD DON'T BE."

Abraham and Isaak, 1944

In the book the reader can trace the development of Barrett's style from his early purely figurative work of the 1930s through the abstracting of his figures during the 1950s and 1960s and finally a return to the realistic portraiture in his last years. In looking at the body of work, poetic and sculptural, that is presented in the book it is clear that the themes that Barrett was interested in, spirituality, mythology, eroticism and a love of music, were ones that he was drawn to early in his life and never abandoned.

A poem "Isaak Speaks", written in September 1979, addresses the biblical story, where Abraham is so devoted to God that he is prepared to sacrifice his own son, although at the last minute an angel stops this from happening. In Barrett's short poem, "Being conceivable is deed enough" and the thought is enough to wreak the destruction. It ends:

O Father Abraham
I am unsexed
your knife is buried in my brain.

== Prizes and awards ==
- 1943 1st prize Art Association, New Orleans,
- 1943 1st prize New Orleans Arts and Crafts Club
- 1944 1st prize Art Association, New Orleans
- 1947 Fellowship at Yaddo
- 1948 1st prize 7th Annual Exhibition, Audubon Artists, New York.
- 1950 Gold Medal, 8th Annual Exhibition Audubon Artists, New York.
- 1953 Gold Medal for Sculpture, K.A. Artists' Annual, Riverside Museum, New York.
- 1960 Life Fellowship at International Institute of Arts and Letters.

== Selected books ==
- Barrett, Oliver O'Connor (1950). Little Benny Wanted a Pony. Illustrated by Richard Scarry. Simon and Schuster.
- Barrett, Connor (1980). Myself Emerging; A Book of Sculpture and Poetry.
