= Tobias Brenan =

English footballer (born 2006)

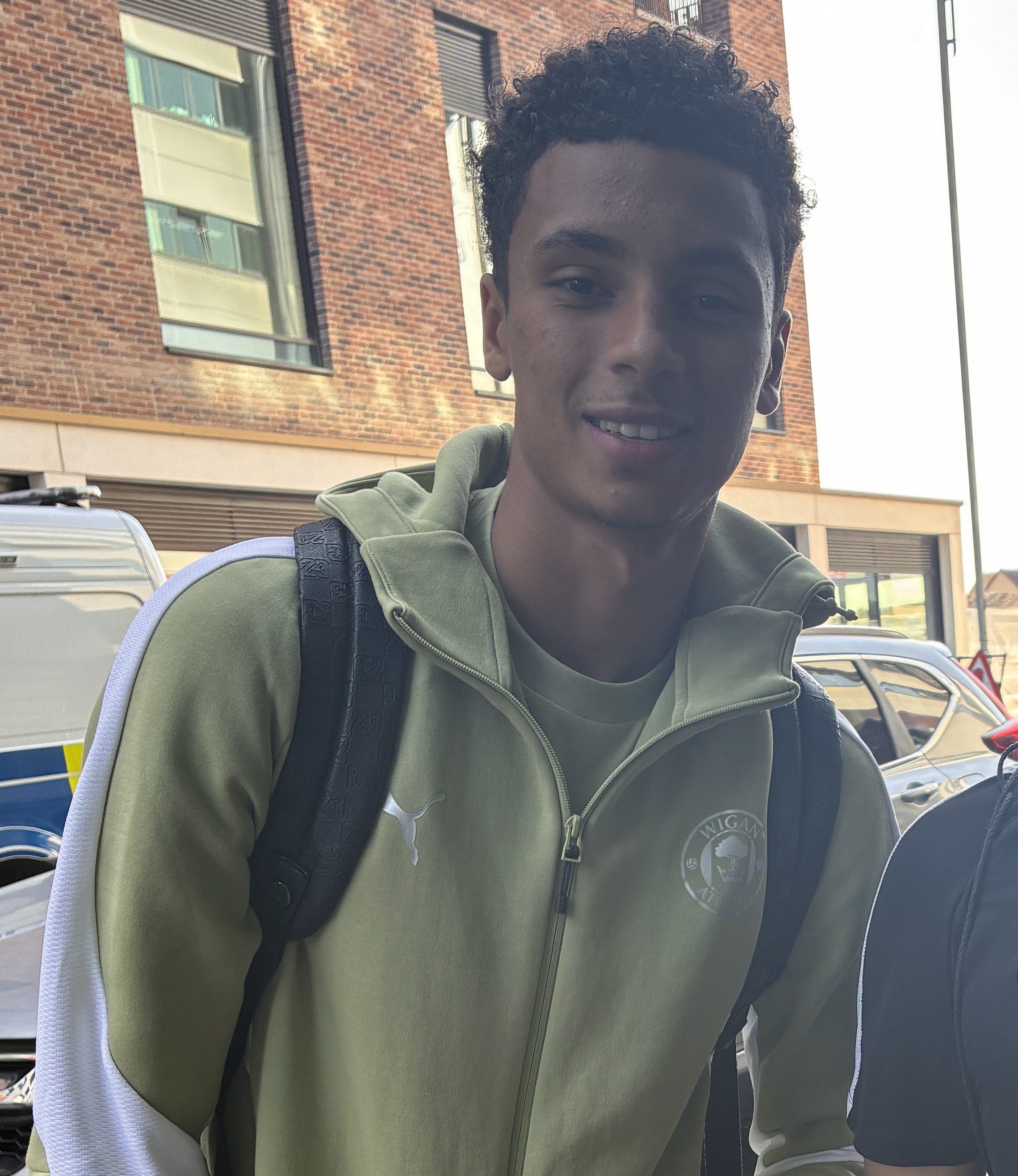
- Tobias Brenan in 2025.

Personal information
- Full name: Tobias Toumai Moses Brenan
- Date of birth: 16 July 2006 (age 20)
- Place of birth: London, England
- Height: 1.88 m (6 ft 2 in)
- Position: Midfielder

Team information
- Current team: Bromley

Youth career
- –2024: Oxford United
- 2025–2026: Wigan Athletic

Senior career*
Years	Team	Apps	(Gls)
2024	Oxford United	0	(0)
2024	→ Didcot Town (loan)	14	(1)
2025–2026	Wigan Athletic	5	(0)
2026	→ Harrogate Town (loan)	16	(3)
2026–	Bromley	1	(0)
- * Club domestic league appearances and goals as of 15:32, 31 August 2026 (UTC)

Tobias Toumai Moses Brenan (born 16 July 2006) is an English professional footballer who plays as a midfielder for EFL League One club Bromley.

== Career ==
Brenan started his career with Oxford United, signing a two-year scholarship in May 2022. In February 2024, he joined Southern League Premier Division South club Didcot Town initially on a short-term loan, then extended for the remainder of the season.

=== Wigan Athletic ===
In January 2025, having spent the first half of the season on trial with the club, Brenan joined League One club Wigan Athletic. Ahead of the 2025–26 season, Brenan impressed first-team manager Ryan Lowe with his performances in friendlies, going on to make his senior debut on the opening day of the season in a 3–1 victory over Northampton Town. In October 2025, he signed a new three-year contract with the Latics.

On 2 February 2026, Brenan joined League Two club Harrogate Town on loan for the remainder of the 2025–26 season.

=== Bromley ===
Brenan signed with fellow League One club Bromley on 18 August 2026 for an undisclosed fee.

== Career statistics ==
As of match played 8 August 2026

Appearances and goals by club, season and competition
Club	Season	League			FA Cup		League Cup		Other		Total	
Club	Season	Division	Apps	Goals	Apps	Goals	Apps	Goals	Apps	Goals	Apps	Goals
Oxford United	2023–24	League One	0	0	0	0	0	0	0	0	0	0
Didcot Town (loan)	2023–24	Southern League Premier Division South	14	1	0	0	—		0	0	14	1
Wigan Athletic	2025–26	League One	5	0	1	0	2	0	3 (Note: Appearance(s) in EFL Trophy)	0	11	0
Wigan Athletic	2026–27	League One	0	0	0	0	1	0	0	0	1	0
Wigan Athletic	Total		5	0	1	0	3	0	3	0	12	0
Harrogate Town (loan)	2025–26	League Two	16	3	0	0	0	0	0	0	16	3
Bromley	2026–27	League One	0	0	0	0	0	0	0	0	0	0
Career total			35	4	1	0	3	0	3	0	42	4
