= Tom Cursons =

English footballer (born 2001)

Personal information
- Full name: Thomas Michael Cursons
- Date of birth: 15 November 2001 (age 24)
- Place of birth: Chertsey, England
- Position: Forward

Team information
- Current team: Boston United
- Number: 18

Senior career*
Years	Team	Apps	(Gls)
2019–2021	Metropolitan Police	11	(1)
2019–2020	→ Badshot Lea (loan)		
2021	Walton & Hersham		
2021–2022	Hartley Wintney	1	(0)
2022	Gainsborough Trinity	23	(0)
2022–2023	Long Eaton United	23	(10)
2023–2024	Barwell	22	(5)
2024–2025	Ilkeston Town	44	(33)
2025–2026	Harrogate Town	28	(4)
2026–	Boston United	10	(7)
- * Club domestic league appearances and goals as of 17:51, 22 March 2026 (UTC)

Tom Cursons (born 15 November 2001) is an English professional footballer who plays for Boston United, as a forward.

== Career ==
Cursons spent his early career in non-league with Metropolitan Police, spending time on loan at Badshot Lea.

After time with Walton & Hersham, he joined Hartley Wintney in December 2021.

He joined Gainsborough Trinity in January 2022, moving to Long Eaton United in November 2022. He moved to Barwell in August 2023.

After joining Ilkeston Town, he signed a new contract with the club in February 2024. Following rich goalscoring form across both seasons, which saw 12 goals in 18 games in 2023–24, and 25 goals in 31 games in 2024–25, in September 2024 Ilkeston rejected an offer for Cursons from an unnamed club. He also captained the football team of Nottingham Trent University.

In January 2025, after reportedly attracting attention from a number of Football League teams, Cursons signed for Harrogate Town, turning professional with the club.

In January 2026 he was sold to Boston United.
