= Deon Woodman =

Kenyan footballer (born 2002)

Personal information
- Full name: Deonysus Sangai Woodman
- Date of birth: 1 December 2002 (age 23)
- Place of birth: Hounslow, England
- Height: 1.92 m (6 ft 4 in)
- Position: Centre-back

Team information
- Current team: Bromley
- Number: 15

Youth career
- –2021: Crystal Palace
- 2021–2022: Queens Park Rangers

Senior career*
Years	Team	Apps	(Gls)
2022–2024	Queens Park Rangers	0	(0)
2023	→ Dulwich Hamlet (loan)	8	(0)
2024	→ Wealdstone (loan)	2	(0)
2024	→ Southend United (loan)	5	(0)
2024–2026	Wealdstone	52	(2)
2024	→ St Albans City (loan)	5	(1)
2024–2025	→ St Albans City (loan)	18	(1)
2026–	Bromley	1	(0)

International career^{‡}
2026–	Kenya	1	(0)
- * Club domestic league appearances and goals as of 11:47, 25 September 2026 (UTC) ‡ National team caps and goals as of 19:25, 7 June 2026 (UTC)

Deonysus Sangai Woodman (born 1 December 2002) is a professional footballer who plays as a centre-back for EFL League One club Bromley. Born in England, he represents the Kenya national football team.

== Club career ==
Woodman started his career in the youth system of Crystal Palace, before moving to Queens Park Rangers in 2021, where he joined the Development Squad. In March 2023, he joined National League South side Dulwich Hamlet for the remainder of the season. The following year, he had loan spells with Wealdstone and Southend United.

On 30 April 2024, Woodman rejoined Wealdstone on a permanent deal. He had two separate loan spells at St Albans City in the 2024–25 season, before being recalled in March 2025. He subsequently established himself in Wealdstone's first team, being named 2025–26 Supporters' Club player of the season and playing the full 90 minutes of the 2026 FA Trophy final.

On 11 July 2026, Woodman signed for newly promoted EFL League One side Bromley.

== International career ==
Born in England, Woodman is eligible for Kenya through his mother, who is from Kehancha. He made his Kenya debut on 7 June 2026, in a 4–0 win against Lesotho at the Lucas Moripe Stadium.

== Career statistics ==
=== International ===
As of match played 7 June 2026

Appearances and goals by national team and year
National team	Year	Apps	Goals
Kenya	2026	1	0
Total		1	0

== Honours ==
Wealdstone

- FA Trophy runner-up: 2025–26
