= Thomas Hill (footballer, born 2002) =

Welsh footballer

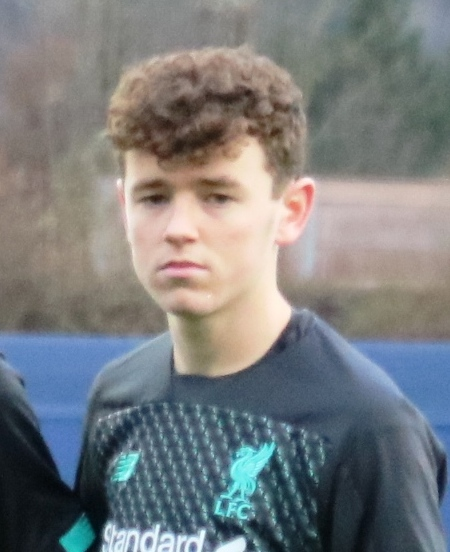
- Hill in 2019

Personal information
- Full name: Thomas Daniel Hill
- Date of birth: 13 October 2002 (age 24)
- Place of birth: Formby, England
- Position: Midfielder

Team information
- Current team: Oldham Athletic
- Number: 30

Youth career
- 2007–2019: Liverpool

Senior career*
Years	Team	Apps	(Gls)
2019–2025	Liverpool	0	(0)
2025–2026	Harrogate Town	14	(0)
2026–	Oldham Athletic	0	(0)

International career^{‡}
2023	Wales U21	1	(0)
- * Club domestic league appearances and goals as of 15:30, 4 August 2026 (UTC) ‡ National team caps and goals as of 14:35, 13 October 2023 (UTC)

Thomas Daniel Hill (born 13 October 2002) is a professional footballer who plays as a midfielder for EFL League Two club Oldham Athletic. He is a former Wales under 21 international.

== Club career ==
=== Liverpool ===
Hill made his professional debut for Liverpool on 17 December 2019, starting in the away match against Aston Villa in the quarter-finals of the EFL Cup. On 5 August 2020, Hill signed a contract extension with Liverpool.

In September 2020, Hill suffered a season-ending ACL injury; the next month, he signed a new long-term deal with Liverpool after turning 18.

==== Harrogate Town ====
On 22 January 2025, Hill joined EFL League Two club Harrogate Town on an 18-month contract. At the end of his contract, he was invited back to train with the club during pre-season.

However, in August 2026, he instead joined Oldham Athletic on a one-year deal.

== International career ==
Born in England, Hill is of Irish and Welsh descent. On 11 March 2022, he was called up by the Republic of Ireland national under-20 football team. On 14 March 2023, he was called up to the Wales national under-21 football team. On 13 October 2023, he made his Wales Under-21 debut in a 2025 UEFA European Under-21 Championship qualifying match against Czech Republic.

== Career statistics ==
Appearances and goals by club, season and competition
Club	Season	League			FA Cup		EFL Cup		Europe		Other		Total	
Club	Season	Division	Apps	Goals	Apps	Goals	Apps	Goals	Apps	Goals	Apps	Goals	Apps	Goals
Liverpool U21	2019–20	—			—		—		—		2 (Note: Appearances in EFL Trophy)	0	2	0
Liverpool	2019–20	Premier League	0	0	0	0	1	0	—		—		1	0
Total			0	0	0	0	1	0	0	0	2	0	3	0
