= Riverside Museum (disambiguation) =

Riverside Museum may refer to:

- Riverside Museum, part of the Glasgow Museum of Transport, in Glasgow, Scotland.
- Riverside Museum, contemporary art museum in New York City open from 1938-1971
- Riverside Museum at Blake's Lock
- Any of several museums in Riverside, California, United States:
  - Riverside Art Museum
  - Museum of Riverside
  - List of museums in Riverside, California
