= Stephen Duke-McKenna =

Guyanese footballer (born 2000)

Personal information
- Full name: Stephen Winston Duke-McKenna
- Date of birth: 17 August 2000 (age 26)
- Place of birth: Liverpool, England
- Height: 1.70 m (5 ft 7 in)
- Position: Midfielder

Team information
- Current team: Crawley Town
- Number: 10

Youth career
- 2011–2018: Everton
- 2018–2019: Bolton Wanderers
- 2019–2020: Queens Park Rangers

Senior career*
Years	Team	Apps	(Gls)
2020–2024	Queens Park Rangers	6	(0)
2020	→ Hemel Hempstead Town (loan)	7	(0)
2022	→ Torquay United (loan)	21	(3)
2022–2023	→ Leyton Orient (loan)	10	(0)
2024	→ Sutton United (loan)	16	(2)
2024–2026	Harrogate Town	22	(3)
2025	→ St Johnstone (loan)	11	(0)
2026–	Crawley Town	6	(0)

International career^{‡}
2018–	Guyana	32	(7)
- * Club domestic league appearances and goals as of 20:49, 18 November 2026 (UTC) ‡ National team caps and goals as of 16 November 2026

Stephen Winston Duke-McKenna is a professional footballer who plays as a midfielder for EFL League Two side Crawley Town. Born in England, he plays for the Guyana national team.

== Club career ==
=== Early career ===
He was raised in Everton youth teams, joining aged 11 and made one bench appearance for the senior team on 7 December 2017 in a Europa League game against Apollon Limassol.

On 15 June 2018, he signed a pro contract with Bolton Wanderers. He played in the Professional Development League for Bolton Wanderers Development Squad in the 2018–19 season.

=== Queens Park Rangers ===
On 27 August 2019 Duke-McKenna signed for Queens Park Rangers and will be part of the Development squad.

He joined Hemel Hempstead Town on a one-month loan deal in October 2020.

On 17 April 2021, he made his Queens Park Rangers debut in a 2–1 away win against Middlesbrough, coming on as a substitute in the 86th minute.

On 21 January 2022, Duke–McKenna joined National League side Torquay United on loan for the remainder of the 2021–22 season.

On 1 September 2022, Duke-McKenna joined League Two club Leyton Orient on a season-long loan deal.

In January 2024, he joined Sutton United in League Two on loan for the remainder of the season. He scored his first two goals for the club and also registered an assist on the final day of the season in a 4–4 draw with MK Dons, a result which confirmed Sutton's relegation.

On 20 May 2024, QPR announced he would leave the club in the summer when his contract expired.

=== Harrogate Town ===
On 17 June 2024, Duke-McKenna signed for League Two side Harrogate Town on a two-year contract. He struggled to make an impact for the club in the first half of the 2024–25 season for the club, managing a goal and two assists for Harrogate, before joining Scottish Premiership club St Johnstone on loan until the end of the season on 3 February 2025. He made his debut for the club as a substitute in a Scottish Cup win over Hamilton Academical on 15 February, and made 14 appearances without scoring in all competitions over his loan spell at the club.

Duke-McKenna returned to Harrogate for the 2025–26 season, and started the season well with five goal contributions in the first 10 matches, with manager Simon Weaver claiming that Duke-McKenna was "proving his point and his worth". He suffered a broken metatarsal in December 2025, leaving him injured for three months after six goals in 20 matches up to that point, and made a further 11 appearances without scoring following his return from injury in late February, as Harrogate were relegated from League Two after finishing 23rd.

On 15 May 2026, Harrogate announced the player would be released in the summer when his contract expired.

=== Crawley Town ===
On 11 June 2026, Duke-McKenna signed for Crawley Town on a two-year deal with an option of a third. He was injured in Crawley's opening league match of the season, against Crewe Alexandra which left him unavailable for two months. He scored on his return from injury on 6 October 2026 with a "stunning goal" in a 4–0 EFL Trophy win over Bromley.

== International career ==
He was called up to the Guyana national football team in October 2018. He made his debut for Guyana on 20 November 2018 in a CONCACAF Nations League qualifier against French Guiana as a 74th-minute substitute for Colin Nelson. on 30 May 2019, Duke-Mckenna was named to Guyana's squad for the 2019 CONCACAF Gold Cup.

== Career statistics ==
=== Club ===
As of match played 8 November 2026

Appearances and goals by club, season and competition
Club	Season	League			National cup (Note: Includes FA Cup, Scottish Cup)		League cup (Note: Includes EFL Cup, Scottish League Cup)		Other		Total	
Club	Season	Division	Apps	Goals	Apps	Goals	Apps	Goals	Apps	Goals	Apps	Goals
Queens Park Rangers	2020–21	Championship	1	0	—		0	0	—		1	0
Queens Park Rangers	2021–22	Championship	0	0	0	0	3	0	—		3	0
Queens Park Rangers	2022–23	Championship	0	0	0	0	0	0	—		0	0
Queens Park Rangers	2023–24	Championship	5	0	0	0	1	0	—		6	0
Queens Park Rangers	Total		6	0	0	0	4	0	—		10	0
Hemel Hempstead Town (loan)	2020–21	National League South	7	0	1	0	—		0	0	8	0
Torquay United (loan)	2021–22	National League	21	3	—		—		—		21	3
Leyton Orient (loan)	2022–23	League Two	10	0	1	0	0	0	2 (Note: Appearance(s) in EFL Trophy)	0	13	0
Sutton United (loan)	2023–24	League Two	16	2	0	0	0	0	0	0	16	2
Harrogate Town	2024–25	League Two	18	1	3	0	1	0	2	0	24	1
Harrogate Town	2025–26	League Two	28	0	1	0	1	0	1	0	31	0
Harrogate Town	Total		46	1	4	0	2	0	3	0	55	1
St Johnstone (loan)	2024–25	Scottish Premiership	11	0	3	0	0	0	0	0	14	0
Crawley Town	2026–27	League Two	6	0	1	0	2	0	1	2	10	2
Career total			123	6	10	0	8	0	6	2	147	8

=== International ===
As of match played 25 March 2025

Appearances and goals by national team and year
National team	Year	Apps	Goals
Guyana	2018	1	0
Guyana	2019	4	0
Guyana	2020	0	0
Guyana	2021	3	0
Guyana	2022	3	0
Guyana	2023	7	1
Guyana	2024	8	1
Guyana	2025	4	2
Guyana	2026	2	3
Total		32	7

As of match played 16 November 2026:Guyana score listed first, score column indicates score after each Duke-McKenna goal

List of international goals scored by Stephen Duke-McKenna
No.	Date	Venue	Cap	Opponent	Score	Result	Competition
1	12 September 2023	Synthetic Track and Field Facility, Leonora, Guyana	14	Bahamas	2–1	3–2	2023–24 CONCACAF Nations League
2	12 November 2024	Synthetic Track and Field Facility, Leonora, Guyana	14	Guatemala	1–1	1–3	2024–25 CONCACAF Nations League
3	15 November 2025	Sir Vivian Richards Stadium, North Sound, Antigua and Barbuda	29	Bonaire	1–0	2–1	2025–26 CONCACAF Series
4	18 November 2025	Sir Vivian Richards Stadium, North Sound, Antigua and Barbuda	30	Antigua and Barbuda	4–1	4–1	2025–26 CONCACAF Series
5	12 November 2026	Synthetic Track and Field Facility, Georgetown, Guyana	31	Cayman Islands	4–0	6–0	2026–27 CONCACAF Nations League B
6	12 November 2026	Synthetic Track and Field Facility, Georgetown, Guyana	31	Cayman Islands	5–0	6–0	2026–27 CONCACAF Nations League B
7	16 November 2026	Synthetic Track and Field Facility, Georgetown, Guyana	32	Puerto Rico	3–1	4–2	2026–27 CONCACAF Nations League B

== Honours ==
Leyton Orient

- EFL League Two: 2022–23
