= 2023–24 Oldham Athletic A.F.C. season =

Oldham Athletic current football season

Oldham Athletic A.F.C.
2023–24 season
- Chairman: Frank Rothwell
- Head Coach: David Unsworth (until 17 September); Steve Thompson (interim, from 17 September to 12 October); Micky Mellon (from 13 October)
- Stadium: Boundary Park
- National League: 10th
- FA Cup: First Round
- FA Trophy: Fourth Round
- Top goalscorer: League: James Norwood (17); All: James Norwood (18)
- Highest home attendance: 11,881
- Lowest home attendance: 5,538
- Average home league attendance: 6,962

The 2023–24 season was the 129th in Oldham Athletic's history, and the club's second season since dropping out of the Football League. The club competed in the National League, the FA Cup and the FA Trophy.

== Season summary ==
=== Pre-season ===
Immediately following the conclusion of the 2022–23 season, Oldham announced that 18 of the players contracted for the previous season remained in contract but that nine players would be released and four players who had ended the 2022–23 season on loan would return to their parent clubs. The club also confirmed that negotiations were ongoing to extend the contracts of Devarn Green, Mathew Hudson, Junior Luamba and Josef Yarney.

A new hybrid pitch was laid at Boundary Park, with work commencing on 8 May 2023 and extending over the summer period, meaning that all but the final pre-season friendly would be played away from Boundary Park.

On 8 June 2023, Paul Murray returned to the club as Academy Manager, resuming a job he had left in 2021.

=== End of the Unsworth era ===
The season began with two weeks of contrasting fortunes: a 4–0 defeat away at Southend United being followed by a comprehensive 5–1 win at home to Aldershot Town.

Following this was a run of seven games without a win in which Oldham scored only four goals. The club's board initially stood behind manager David Unsworth, with chairman Frank Rothwell addressing a group of travelling supporters before a 2–2 draw at Gateshead to demonstrate his support for Unsworth. However, discontent amongst the club's supporters continued to grow following a 0–0 draw at home to Dorking Wanderers and Unsworth was dismissed following a 3–0 defeat away at Bromley.

=== Interim management ===
Steve Thompson, the club's Head of Recruitment, was appointed as manager on an interim basis following Unsworth's departure, with the club's board confirming that a number of applications for the role of first team manager had been received and that a recruitment process would be followed before an appointment was made.

In the meantime, Thompson appointed Neil Redfearn as his assistant manager, Redfearn returning to Boundary Park where, 32 years earlier, he had scored the most famous goal in the club's history, securing the Second Division title with a last minute penalty kick.

Thompson and Redfearn left the club on 12 October 2023 two days before an FA Cup tie with Altrincham with academy manager Paul Murray taking charge of that match. Then, they won the match 1–0 with Harrison McGahey scoring.

=== Micky Mellon ===
Micky Mellon was announced on 13 October 2023 as the club's new first team manager. Mellon sat in the stands for the following day's FA Cup match against Altrincham and took charge of his first match against the team's bitter rivals Rochdale the following week, a match which Oldham would go on to win 4–3.

Mellon led Oldham on a strong run, taking them from 12th in the table into play-off positions for most of January and February. However, a run of one win in fourteen games at the end of the season resulted in a disappointing 10th-place finish and to Mellon lamenting that his squad needed "major surgery" for it to challenge for promotion in the following season.

== Players ==
=== Squad at the end of the season ===
No	Pos	Nat	Name	Age	Debut	App	Start	Sub	Goal	Yellow card	Red card	Notes
1	GK	(England)	Magnus Norman	27	6 Aug 2022	48	48	0	0	2	0	
2	DF	(England)	Sai Sachdev	19	23 Jan 2024	6	6	0	0	1	0	Loan from Sheffield Utd
3	DF	(England)	Mark Kitching	28	6 Nov 2022	80	79	1	2	14	0	
4	DF	(England)	Liam Hogan	35	6 Aug 2022	82	79	3	2	20	1	Captain
5	DF	(England)	Shaun Hobson	25	5 Aug 2023	38	35	3	0	4	0	
6	MF	(England)	Mark Shelton	27	24 Jan 2023	35	30	5	2	6	1	
7	FW	(England)	Kurt Willoughby	26	12 Aug 2023	17	5	12	1	0	0	Loan at Ayr Utd
8	MF	(England)	Josh Lundstram	25	30 Sep 2023	29	25	4	0	4	0	
9	FW	(Cameroon)	Mike Fondop	30	5 Feb 2022	75	39	36	25	9	4	
10	FW	(England)	Joe Nuttall	27	26 Dec 2022	37	35	2	8	8	0	Loan at Cheltenham Town
11	MF	(England)	Dan Ward	26	5 Aug 2023	8	6	2	0	0	0	
13	GK	(England)	Mathew Hudson	25	18 Mar 2023	51	51	0	0	1	0	
14	DF	(England)	Nathan Sheron	26	6 Aug 2022	97	91	6	9	18	0	
15	FW	(England)	Devarn Green	27	18 Feb 2023	43	34	9	6	6	0	
16	DF	(England)	Charlie Raglan	30	5 Aug 2023	34	33	1	0	3	0	
17	DF	(England)	Harrison McGahey	28	25 Sep 2021	65	61	4	2	10	0	
18	MF	(England)	Ben Tollitt	29	6 Aug 2022	46	34	12	9	6	0	Loan at Chester
19	MF	(England)	Dan Gardner	34	19 Aug 2017	123	107	16	8	29	1	
20	FW	(Barbados)	Hallam Hope	30	14 Aug 2021	84	60	24	12	6	0	
21	DF	(England)	Will Sutton	21	10 Nov 2020	58	57	1	3	8	1	
22	MF	(England)	Brennan Dickenson	31	5 Aug 2023	18	14	4	5	4	0	Loan at Hartlepool Utd
24	FW	(England)	Joe Garner	36	3 Feb 2024	14	11	3	4	4	0	
25	FW	(England)	Alex Reid	28	3 Dec 2022	34	19	15	9	3	0	
26	MF	(Wales)	Oli Hammond	21	23 Jan 2024	11	8	3	0	0	0	
27	DF	(Portugal)	Benny Couto	20	31 Aug 2021	40	25	15	1	2	0	Loan at Ashton Utd
28	FW	(England)	Ethan Walker	21	13 Jan 2024	4	2	2	0	0	0	Loan from Blackburn
29	FW	(Scotland)	Andrew Dallas	24	27 Jan 2024	14	7	7	0	1	0	Loan from Barnsley
30	FW	(England)	James Norwood	33	5 Aug 2023	44	37	7	18	11	0	
31	MF	(England)	Kofi Moore	19	23 Dec 2023	1	0	1	0	0	0	
32	MF	(England)	Tom Conlon	28	13 Jan 2024	18	15	3	0	3	0	
99	GK	(England)	Dan Langley	23	n/a	0	0	0	0	0	0	Loan at Blyth Spartans
–	DF	(England)	Jordan Windass	24	20 Aug 2022	1	0	1	0	0	0	Loan at Darlington

=== Left the club during the season ===
No	Pos	Nat	Name	Age	Debut	Apps	Starts	Subs	Goal	Yellow card	Red card	Notes
–	MF	(England)	John Rooney	33	1 Oct 2022	36	28	8	2	6	0	Released 31 August
23	DF	(Wales)	Kieron Freeman	32	12 Aug 2023	10	10	0	0	1	0	
24	FW	(England)	Josh Stones	20	16 Dec 2023	4	4	0	3	1	0	

== Pre-season fixtures ==
On 17 May 2023 Oldham Athletic announced six pre-season friendlies to be played before the start of the National League season. Pitch renovation work at Boundary Park meant that the first five fixtures would all be played away from home, with only the sixth and final game able to be played at Boundary Park.

8 July 2023	Hyde United	0–0	Oldham Athletic	Hyde
15:00 BST		Report		Stadium: Ewen Fields; Attendance: 1,359

15 July 2023	Southport	1–1	Oldham Athletic	Southport
15:00 BST	Anson 84'	Report	Nuttall (red card) 63'; Green 70'	Stadium: Haig Avenue

18 July 2023	Chorley	1–6	Oldham Athletic	Chorley
19:45 BST	Hazelhurst 16'	Report	Fondop 24'; Reid 38'; Reid 68'; Green 73'; Willoughby 74'; Fondop 89'	Stadium: Victory Park

22 July 2023	Curzon Ashton	1–2	Oldham Athletic	Ashton-under-Lyne
15:00 BST	Mols 60'	Report	Fondop 9'; Fondop 36'	Stadium: Tameside Stadium

25 July 2023	Barrow	1–1	Oldham Athletic	Barrow
19:45 BST	Foley 18'	Report	Nuttall 32'	Stadium: Holker Street

29 July 2023	Oldham Athletic	0–3	Mansfield Town	Oldham
15:00 BST		Report	Akins 34', 53'; Oates 58'	Stadium: Boundary Park; Attendance: 2,425

== Competitions ==
Oldham Athletic will play in the National League in the 2023–24 season. It will join the FA Cup at the Fourth Qualifying Round and the FA Trophy at the Third Round.

=== National League ===
==== League table ====
Pos	Team	Pld	W	D	L	GF	GA	GD	Pts
8	Aldershot Town	46	20	9	17	74	83	−9	69
9	Southend United	46	21	12	13	70	45	+25	65 (Note: Southend United were deducted ten points for failing to pay debt to HMRC.)
10	Oldham Athletic	46	15	18	13	63	60	+3	63
11	Rochdale	46	16	14	16	69	64	+5	62
12	Hartlepool United	46	17	9	20	70	82	−12	60

Source: National League official site
Rules for classification: 1) Points; 2) Goal difference; 3) Number of goals scored; 4) Number of matches won; 5) Head-to-head results

==== Results summary ====
Overall								Home						Away					
Pld	W	D	L	GF	GA	GD	Pts	W	D	L	GF	GA	GD	W	D	L	GF	GA	GD
46	15	18	13	63	60	+3	63	6	9	8	33	30	+3	9	9	5	30	30	0

Last updated: 20 April 2024.

==== Results by matchday ====
Matchday	1	2	3	4	5	6	7	8	9	10	11	12	13	14	15	16	17	18	19	20	21	22	23	24	25	26	27	28	29	30	31	32	33	34	35	36	37	38	39	40	41	42	43	44	45	46
Ground	A	H	H	A	A	H	A	H	A	H	H	A	A	H	H	A	A	H	H	A	A	H	A	H	A	H	A	H	H	A	H	A	A	H	A	H	H	A	H	A	H	A	H	A	A	H
Result	L	W	L	D	D	L	D	D	L	W	W	W	D	D	D	W	L	D	D	W	W	L	W	L	W	W	W	W	L	D	W	W	D	L	W	D	D	L	D	D	L	L	D	D	D	L
Position	24	10	17	15	15	20	18	17	22	19	13	10	12	11	12	10	11	10	10	10	10	10	10	11	10	8	6	5	6	8	6	6	7	7	6	6	5	6	8	9	9	9	9	10	10	10

Updated to match(es) played on 20 April 2024. Source: bbc.co.uk
A = Away; H = Home; W = Win; D = Draw; L = Loss

==== Matches ====
Oldham's fixtures were announced on 5 July 2023.

5 August 2023 1	Southend United	4–0	Oldham Athletic	Southend-on-Sea
15:00 BST	Powell 9'; Miley (yellow card) 35'; Kensdale (yellow card) 59'; Coker 84' (yellow card) 90+9'; Mooney 87'; Cardwell 90+6'	Report	Norwood (yellow card) 17'; Hobson (yellow card) 23'; Hogan (yellow card) 42'; Sheron (yellow card) 45+3'; Sutton (red card) 57'; Dickenson (yellow card) 69'	Stadium: Roots Hall; Attendance: 5,881; Referee: Richie Watkins

12 August 2023 2	Oldham Athletic	5–1	Aldershot Town	Oldham
15:00 BST	Raglan (yellow card) 8'; Norwood 32' 86'; Dickenson 36' 88'; Tollitt 43' (yellow card) 73'	Report	O'Keefe (yellow card) 20'; Kitching 74' (o.g.); Thomas (yellow card) 64' (yellow-red card) 84'	Stadium: Boundary Park; Attendance: 7,593; Referee: Jamie O'Connor

15 August 2023 3	Oldham Athletic	1–2	FC Halifax Town	Oldham
19:45 BST	Shelton 40' (yellow card) 55'; Norwood (yellow card) 61'; Fondop (yellow card) 82'; Kitching (yellow card) 90'	Report	Harker 31'; Senior (yellow card) 41' (goal) 66'; Keane (yellow card) 82'; Hunter (yellow card) 82'	Stadium: Boundary Park; Attendance: 7,964; Referee: Steven Copeland

19 August 2023 4	Chesterfield	1–1	Oldham Athletic	Chesterfield
15:00 BST	Palmer 61'	Report	Nuttall (yellow card) 32'; Shelton (yellow card) 45+1'; Hogan (yellow card) 60'; Norwood 90+6'	Stadium: SMH Group Stadium; Attendance: 8,164; Referee: Matthew Russell

19 August 2023 5	Boreham Wood	0–0	Oldham Athletic	Borehamwood
15:00 BST	Stephens (yellow card) 7'; Coxe (yellow card) 87'	Report		Stadium: Meadow Park; Attendance: 1,208; Referee: Aaron Farmer

28 August 2023 6	Oldham Athletic	0–2	Solihull Moors	Oldham
15:00 BST	Fondop (yellow card) 1' (yellow-red card) 37'; Gardner (yellow card) 11'; Reid (yellow card) 45+2'; Dickenson (yellow card) 70'; Sheron (yellow card) 76'	Report	Beck 57'; Kelly 90+4'	Stadium: Boundary Park; Attendance: 6,815; Referee: Paul Cooper

2 September 2023 7	Gateshead	2–2	Oldham Athletic	Gateshead
17:30 BST	Dinanga (yellow card) 55'; Hunter 58' (yellow card) 90+5'; Wearne 87'	Report	Shelton (yellow card) 16' (yellow-red card) 89'; Dickenson 28'; Hogan (yellow card) 54' (goal) 65'; Norwood (yellow card) 57'; Sheron (yellow card) 78'	Stadium: Gateshead International Stadium; Attendance: 1,112; Referee: Gareth Rhodes

9 September 2023 8	Oldham Athletic	0–0	Dorking Wanderers	Oldham
15:00 BST	Green (yellow card) 47'; Sheron (yellow card) 71'	Report	Francomb (yellow card) 29'; Pybus (yellow card) 40'	Stadium: Boundary Park; Attendance: 6,291; Referee: Richard Aspinall

16 September 2023 9	Bromley	3–0	Oldham Athletic	Bromley
15:00 BST	Passley 27' (yellow card) 38'; Woods 41'; Whitely 66'	Report	Sutton (yellow card) 55'; Norwood (yellow card) 76'	Stadium: Hayes Lane; Attendance: 2,571; Referee: Gary Parsons

19 September 2023 10	Oldham Athletic	2–0	York City	Oldham
19:45 BST	Nuttall 8' (yellow card) 61'; Kitching (yellow card) 63'; Green (yellow card) 70'; Reid 79'	Report	Crookes (yellow card) 70'	Stadium: Boundary Park; Attendance: 6,611; Referee: David Mcnamara

23 September 2023 11	Oldham Athletic	4–0	Oxford City	Oldham
15:00 BST	Green 14'; Dickenson 40' 90+5'; Nuttall (yellow card) 77'; Norwood 90'	Report	Coyle (yellow card) 45'; Miccio (yellow card) 90'	Stadium: Boundary Park; Attendance: 6,400; Referee: Paul Marsden

26 September 2023 12	Kidderminster Harriers	1–2	Oldham Athletic	Kidderminster
19:45 BST	Hobson (yellow card) 18' (goal) 62'	Report	Green 20'; Nuttall (yellow card) 53'; Reid 78'	Stadium: Aggborough Stadium; Attendance: 2,451; Referee: David Richardson

30 September 2023 13	Wealdstone	1–1	Oldham Athletic	Ruislip
15:00 BST	Bowen 35'; Barker (yellow card) 49'	Report	Reid 31'; Lundstram (yellow card) 72'	Stadium: Grosvenor Vale; Attendance: 1,640; Referee: Callum Walchester

3 October 2023 14	Oldham Athletic	1–1	Maidenhead United	Oldham
19:45 BST	Reid 28'; Dickenson (yellow card) 39'; Kitching (yellow card) 83'	Report	Adams (yellow card) 39'; De Havilland (yellow card) 87'; Keetch 87'	Stadium: Boundary Park; Attendance: 5,386; Referee: John Mulligan

7 October 2023 15	Oldham Athletic	1–1	Dagenham & Redbridge	Oldham
15:00 BST	Norwood 4'	Report	Effiong (yellow card) 23'; Rees 74'	Stadium: Boundary Park; Attendance: 6,465; Referee: Andrew Humphries

21 October 2023 16	Rochdale	3–4	Oldham Athletic	Rochdale
15:00 BST	Mitchell 53'; Keohane 60' 81'	Report	Sheron 16'; Lundstram (yellow card) 47'; Green 49'; Hope 63'; Norwood 71'; McGahey (yellow card) 88'	Stadium: Spotland; Attendance: 6,722; Referee: James Westgate

24 October 2023 17	AFC Fylde	3–0	Oldham Athletic	Medlar-with-Wesham
19:45 BST	Ustabasi 9' 90+2'; Kay 13'; Whitehead (yellow card) 59'; Barrett (yellow card) 74'	Report	Green (yellow card) 28'; Hogan (yellow card) 30' (yellow-red card) 38'	Stadium: Mill Farm; Attendance: 2,580; Referee: Michael Barlow

28 October 2023 18	Oldham Athletic	2–2	Altrincham	Oldham
15:00 BST	Norwood 30' (yellow card) 81'; Sheron (yellow card) 55' (goal) 79'	Report	Amaluzor 15'; Conn-Clarke 35'; Osborne (yellow card) 75'	Stadium: Boundary Park; Referee: Aaron Jackson

11 November 2023 19	Oldham Athletic	1–1	Eastleigh	Oldham
15:00 GMT	Hogan (yellow card) 26'; Norwood (yellow card) 33'; Reid 69'; Hobson (yellow card) 90+4'; Shelton (yellow card) 90+5'	Report	Maguire 26' (pen.); Hodson (yellow card) 29'	Stadium: Boundary Park; Attendance: 6,418; Referee: Aaron Farmer

18 November 2023 20	Woking	0–1	Oldham Athletic	Woking
15:00 GMT	Pavey (yellow card) 61'; Williams (yellow card) 77'	Report	Norwood 61'; Freeman (yellow card) 79'	Stadium: Kingfield Stadium; Attendance: 3,057; Referee: Paul Cooper

21 November 2023 21	Barnet	1–4	Oldham Athletic	Canons Park
19:45 GMT	Walker (yellow card) 24'; Pritchard 56' (pen.); Hartigan (yellow card) 68'	Report	Norwood 26' (pen.) 76'; Kitching (yellow card) 29'; Green (yellow card) 44'; Fondop 61'; Hope 90'; Hogan (yellow card) 90+7'	Stadium: The Hive Stadium; Attendance: 1,799; Referee: Paul Johnson

25 November 2023 22	Oldham Athletic	1–4	Ebbsfleet United	Oldham
15:00 GMT	Norwood 70' (pen.)	Report	Cundle 9'; O'Neill (yellow card) 45+1'; Wright (yellow card) 47'; Samuel (yellow card) 56' (goal) 90+3'; Poleon 80'; Odokonyero 85'	Stadium: Boundary Park; Attendance: 6,425; Referee: Farai Hallam

2 December 2023 P	Oldham Athletic	P-P	Boreham Wood	Oldham
15:00 GMT		Report		Stadium: Boundary Park
Note: The match was postponed on 2 December 2023 because of a frozen pitch.

16 December 2023 23	Solihull Moors	2–3	Oldham Athletic	Solihull
15:00 GMT	Beck 26'; Osborne (yellow card) 30'; Kelly 90+4' (pen.)	Report	Raglan (yellow card) 24'; Sheron (yellow card) 45+1' (goal) 64' 82'; McGahey (yellow card) 54'; Stones 63'; Kitching (yellow card) 68'	Stadium: Damson Park; Attendance: 1,829; Referee: David Richardson

23 December 2023 24	Oldham Athletic	1–2	Gateshead	Oldham
15:00 GMT	Norwood 30' (yellow card) 81'; Hogan (yellow card) 44'; Sutton (yellow card) 59'	Report	Wearne 48'; Booty (yellow card) 58'; Storey 59'; Dinanga (yellow card) 79'	Stadium: Boundary Park; Attendance: 6,761; Referee: Richard Aspinall

26 December 2023 25	Hartlepool United	1–3	Oldham Athletic	Hartlepool
15:00 GMT	Grey 4'; Onariase (yellow card) 81'	Report	Stones 9' (yellow card) 90+3'; Norwood 17' 63'; Sutton (yellow card) 53'; Lundstram (yellow card) 74'; Raglan (yellow card) 90+2'	Stadium: Victoria Park; Attendance: 5,077; Referee: Michael Barlow

30 December 2023 26	Oldham Athletic	2–0	Hartlepool United	Oldham
15:00 GMT	Stones 2'; Norman (yellow card) 83'; Fondop 84' (yellow card) 85'	Report	Brennan (yellow card) 27'	Stadium: Boundary Park; Attendance: 7,411; Referee: Greg Rollason

6 January 2024 27	Dorking Wanderers	0–1	Oldham Athletic	Dorking
15:00 GMT		Report	Fondop 41' (yellow card) 71'; Hogan (yellow card) 56'	Stadium: Meadowbank; Referee: Ryan Atkin

16 January 2024 P	Oldham Athletic	P-P	Boreham Wood	Oldham
19:45 GMT		Report		Stadium: Boundary Park
Note: The match was postponed on 15 January 2024 because of a frozen pitch.

20 January 2024 P	Eastleigh	P-P	Oldham Athletic	Eastleigh
15:00 GMT		Report		Stadium: Ten Acres
Note: The match was postponed on 20 January 2024 because of a frozen pitch.

23 January 2024 28	Oldham Athletic	2–0	Barnet	Oldham
19:45 GMT	Sachdev (yellow card) 21'; Norwood 38' (pen.) 53' (pen.) (yellow card) 67'; Hogan (yellow card) 60'; Fondop (yellow card) 67'; Kitching (yellow card) 72'	Report	Oluwo (yellow card) 52'; Hall-Johnson (yellow card) 86'	Stadium: Boundary Park; Attendance: 5,880; Referee: Andrew Miller

27 January 2024 29	Oldham Athletic	0–1	Woking	Oldham
15:00 GMT		Report	Dyche (yellow card) 18'; Anderson 46'; Browne (yellow card) 60'	Stadium: Boundary Park; Attendance: 6,644; Referee: David Mcnamara

3 February 2024 30	Ebbsfleet United	0–0	Oldham Athletic	Northfleet
17:30 GMT	Skura (yellow card) 90+3'	Report	Kitching (yellow card) 41'; Lundstram (yellow card) 54'; Conlon (yellow card) 66'	Stadium: Stonbridge Road; Attendance: 1,859; Referee: Ruebyn Ricardo

10 February 2024 P	Oldham Athletic	P-P	Bromley	Oldham
15:00 GMT				Stadium: Boundary Park
Note: The match was postponed because of Bromley's progress in the FA Trophy.

13 February 2024 31	Oldham Athletic	2–1	Boreham Wood	Oldham
19:45 GMT	Conlon (yellow card) 55'; Garner (yellow card) 60' (goal) 80'; Fondop 62'; Kitching (yellow card) 86'	Report	Sagaf 30'; Ashmore (yellow card) 71'; Marsh (yellow card) 77'; Sass-Davies (yellow card) 90+1'	Stadium: Boundary Park; Attendance: 5,745; Referee: John Mulligan

17 February 2024 32	Maidenhead United	1–3	Oldham Athletic	Maidenhead
15:00 GMT	Asare (yellow card) 38'; Barratt (yellow card) 84'; Beckwith 90+1'	Report	Garner 15'; Hogan (yellow card) 36'; Fondop 58' 88'	Stadium: York Road; Attendance: 1,741; Referee: Ross Martin

20 February 2024 33	York City	1–1	Oldham Athletic	York
19:45 GMT	Davies 70'; Amos (yellow card) 90'	Report	Conlon (yellow card) 45'; Fondop 60'	Stadium: York Community Stadium; Attendance: 5,282; Referee: James Westgate

24 February 2024 34	Oldham Athletic	1–2	Kidderminster Harriers	Oldham
15:00 GMT	Fondop (yellow card) 44'; Sheron 49'; Gardner (yellow card) 90+3'	Report	Penny 22'; McNally 58'; Bellis (yellow card) 77'	Stadium: Boundary Park; Attendance: 11,881; Referee: Richard Eley

27 February 2024 35	Eastleigh	1–2	Oldham Athletic	Eastleigh
19:45 GMT	Atangana (yellow card) 25' (yellow-red card) 47'; Boldewijn 84'; Hodson (yellow card) 89'; Nwabuokei (yellow card) 90'	Report	Garner 26' 70'; Green (yellow card) 35'; Sheron (yellow card) 90+5'	Stadium: Ten Acres; Referee: Sam Mulhall

2 March 2024 36	Oldham Athletic	1–1	Southend United	Oldham
15:00 GMT	Hobson (yellow card) 53'; Sheron 60'	Report	Cardwell (yellow card) 62'; Husin 79'	Stadium: Boundary Park; Attendance: 6,309; Referee: Andrew Humphries

5 March 2024 37	Oldham Athletic	0–0	Bromley	Oldham
19:45 GMT	Hogan (yellow card) 64'	Report	Passley (yellow card) 79'; Kirk (yellow card) 84'	Stadium: Boundary Park; Attendance: 5,538; Referee: David Mcnamara

9 March 2024 38	Aldershot Town	2–0	Oldham Athletic	Aldershot
15:00 GMT	Daly 37'; Stokes (yellow card) 51'; Menayese (yellow card) 53'; Frost 90+5'	Report	McGahey (yellow card) 12'; Garner (yellow card) 52'; Hogan (yellow card) 70'; Hudson (yellow card) 73'	Stadium: Recreation Ground; Attendance: 3,425; Referee: Aaron Bannister

12 March 2024 P	FC Halifax Town	P-P	Oldham Athletic	Halifax
19:45 GMT				Stadium: The Shay
Note: The match was postponed on 11 March 2024 because of a waterlogged pitch.

16 March 2024 39	Oldham Athletic	2–2	Chesterfield	Oldham
12:30 GMT	Norwood 13' (pen.); Gardner 23' (yellow card) 63'; Kitching (yellow card) 62'; Garner (yellow card) 84'		Tyrer (yellow card) 11'; Hobson 27'; Sheckleford (yellow card) 47'; Quigley 62' (pen.) (yellow card) 66'; Oldaker (yellow card) 90'	Stadium: Boundary Park; Attendance: 7,783; Referee: Gareth Rhodes

23 March 2024 40	Dagenham & Redbridge	0–0	Oldham Athletic	Dagenham
15:00 GMT	Forson (yellow card) 90+1'	Report	Garner (yellow card) 88'	Stadium: Victoria Road; Attendance: 1,973; Referee: Oliver Mackey

29 March 2024 41	Oldham Athletic	1–3	AFC Fylde	Oldham
15:00 GMT	Kitching (yellow card) 31'; Gardner 45' (yellow card) 65'; Fondop (red card) 60'; Norwood (yellow card) 61'; Hope (yellow card) 90+5'	Report	Haughton 9'; Long 18'; Mitchell 33'; Hosannah (yellow card) 34'	Stadium: Boundary Park; Attendance: 6,903; Referee: Andrew Miller

1 April 2024 42	Altrincham	1–0	Oldham Athletic	Altrincham
15:00 BST	Conn-Clarke 40' (yellow card) 90'; Donawa (yellow card) 65'; Hancox (yellow card) 83'	Report	Kitching (yellow card) 31'	Stadium: Moss Lane; Attendance: 4,578; Referee: Paul Marsden

6 April 2024 43	Oldham Athletic	1–1	Rochdale	Oldham
12:30 BST	Gardner (yellow card) 6'; Hope 6'; Norwood (yellow card) 90+6'	Report	Mather 27'; Gordon (yellow card) 62'	Stadium: Boundary Park; Attendance: 8,797; Referee: Ruebyn Ricardo

10 April 2024 P	FC Halifax Town	P-P	Oldham Athletic	Halifax
19:45 BST				Stadium: The Shay
Note: The match was postponed on 9 April 2024 after a failed pitch inspection.

13 April 2024 44	Oxford City	0–0	Oldham Athletic	Oxford
15:00 BST	Ashby (yellow card) 70'	Report		Stadium: Marsh Lane; Attendance: 1,112; Referee: Sam Mulhall

18 April 2024 45	FC Halifax Town	2–2	Oldham Athletic	Chesterfield
19:45 BST	Jenkins (yellow card) 17'; Harker 45+1'; Golden (yellow card) 57'; George 72'; Hunter (yellow card) 82'	Report	Gardner 18' 58' (pen.); Garner (yellow card) 63'; Dallas (yellow card) 80'; McGahey (yellow card) 90+4'	Stadium: SMH Group Stadium; Attendance: 1,580; Referee: Stuart Morland

20 April 2024 46	Oldham Athletic	2–3	Wealdstone	Oldham
15:00 BST	Fondop 17', 56' (yellow card) 90+2'; Hobson (yellow card) 36'; Hogan (yellow card) 45+2'; Sutton (yellow card) 69'	Report	De Silva (yellow card) 8'; Young 47'; Bowen 52'; Barrett 74'; Barker (yellow card) 88'	Stadium: Boundary Park; Referee: Elliot Bell

=== FA Cup ===
Oldham will join the 2023-24 FA Cup at the Fourth Qualifying Round. Fixtures will take place on the weekend of 14 October 2023, with the draw being made following conclusion of the Third Qualifying Round on the weekend of 30 September 2023.

14 October 2023 Q4	Altrincham	0–1	Oldham Athletic	Altrincham
15:00 BST		Report	Sheron (yellow card) 59'; McGahey 78'	Stadium: Moss Lane; Attendance: 3,874

4 November 2023 1	Newport County	2–0	Oldham Athletic	Newport
15:00 GMT	Morris (yellow card) 19'; McLoughlin 20' 80'; Wood (yellow card) 70'; Bogle (yellow card) 90+7'	Report	Sheron (yellow card) 10'; Kitching (yellow card) 22'	Stadium: Rodney Parade; Attendance: 2,541; Referee: David Middleton

=== FA Trophy ===
Oldham will join the 2023-24 FA Trophy at the Third Round. Fixtures will take place on the weekend of 9 December 2023, with the draw being made following conclusion of the Second Round on the weekend of 18 November 2023

9 December 2023 3	Oldham Athletic	3–3 (4–2 p)	Mickleover	Oldham
15:00 GMT	Fondop 12'; Willoughby 50'; Hope 68'	Report	Greaves 43'; Beavon 66' 84'	Stadium: Boundary Park; Attendance: 1,662; Referee: Elliot Bell
	Penalties
	Willoughby (penalty scored); Hogan (penalty scored); McGahey (penalty scored); Kitching (penalty scored)		Greaves (penalty scored); Mann (penalty scored); Dales (penalty missed); Atkinson (penalty missed)

13 January 2024 4	Oldham Athletic	1–2	Hendon	Oldham
15:00 GMT	Norwood 90+3' (pen.)	Report	White (yellow card) 26' (goal) 67'; Leonard (yellow card) 50'; Muir 90+6'	Stadium: Boundary Park; Attendance: 2,819

== Squad statistics ==
As of match played 20 April 2024

=== Appearances and goals ===
No.	Pos	Nat	Player	Total		National League		FA Cup		FA Trophy	
No.	Pos	Nat	Player	Apps	Goals	Apps	Goals	Apps	Goals	Apps	Goals
1	GK	(England) ENG	Magnus Norman	3	0	2+0	0	0+0	0	1+0	0
2	DF	(England) ENG	Sai Sachdev	6	0	6+0	0	0+0	0	0+0	0
3	DF	(England) ENG	Mark Kitching	47	0	43+0	0	2+0	0	1+1	0
4	DF	(England) ENG	Liam Hogan	46	1	40+2	1	1+1	0	2+0	0
5	DF	(England) ENG	Shaun Hobson	38	0	33+2	0	2+0	0	0+1	0
6	MF	(England) ENG	Mark Shelton	15	1	10+5	1	0+0	0	0+0	0
7	FW	(England) ENG	Kurt Willoughby	17	1	4+11	0	0+0	0	1+1	1
8	MF	(England) ENG	Josh Lundstram	29	0	22+4	0	2+0	0	1+0	0
9	FW	(Cameroon) CMR	Mike Fondop	33	10	15+16	9	0+1	0	1+0	1
10	FW	(England) ENG	Joe Nuttall	13	1	10+2	1	1+0	0	0+0	0
11	MF	(England) ENG	Dan Ward	8	0	5+2	0	0+0	0	1+0	0
13	GK	(England) ENG	Mathew Hudson	47	0	44+0	0	2+0	0	1+0	0
14	DF	(England) ENG	Nathan Sheron	47	6	38+6	6	2+0	0	1+0	0
15	FW	(England) ENG	Devarn Green	28	3	20+6	3	1+0	0	1+0	0
16	DF	(England) ENG	Charlie Raglan	34	0	31+1	0	0+0	0	2+0	0
17	DF	(England) ENG	Harrison McGahey	29	1	23+2	0	2+0	1	2+0	0
18	MF	(England) ENG	Ben Tollitt	6	1	2+3	1	0+1	0	0+0	0
19	MF	(England) ENG	Dan Gardner	28	4	18+7	4	0+1	0	2+0	0
20	FW	(Barbados) BRB	Hallam Hope	20	4	9+8	3	1+0	0	2+0	1
21	DF	(England) ENG	Will Sutton	27	0	25+0	0	1+0	0	1+0	0
22	MF	(England) ENG	Brennan Dickenson	18	5	12+3	5	2+0	0	0+1	0
23	DF	(Wales) WAL	Kieron Freeman	10	0	9+0	0	1+0	0	0+0	0
24	FW	(England) ENG	Josh Stones	4	3	4+0	3	0+0	0	0+0	0
24	FW	(England) ENG	Joe Garner	14	4	11+3	4	0+0	0	0+0	0
25	FW	(England) ENG	Alex Reid	14	5	5+7	5	0+2	0	0+0	0
26	MF	(Wales) WAL	Oli Hammond	11	0	8+3	0	0+0	0	0+0	0
28	FW	(England) ENG	Ethan Walker	4	0	1+2	0	0+0	0	1+0	0
29	FW	(Scotland) SCO	Andrew Dallas	14	0	7+7	0	0+0	0	0+0	0
30	FW	(England) ENG	James Norwood	44	18	34+6	17	2+0	0	1+1	1
31	MF	(England) ENG	Kofi Moore	1	0	0+1	0	0+0	0	0+0	0
32	MF	(England) ENG	Tom Conlon	18	0	15+2	0	0+0	0	0+1	0

=== Disciplinary record ===
No.	Pos.	Nat.	Player	National League			FA Cup			FA Trophy			Total		
No.	Pos.	Nat.	Player	Yellow card	(yellow card) (yellow-red card)	Red card	Yellow card	(yellow card) (yellow-red card)	Red card	Yellow card	(yellow card) (yellow-red card)	Red card	Yellow card	(yellow card) (yellow-red card)	Red card
9	FW	(Cameroon)	Mike Fondop	6	1	1	0	0	0	0	0	0	6	1	1
21	DF	(England)	Will Sutton	4	0	1	0	0	0	0	0	0	4	0	1
4	DF	(England)	Liam Hogan	12	1	0	0	0	0	0	0	0	12	1	0
6	MF	(England)	Mark Shelton	3	1	0	0	0	0	0	0	0	3	1	0
3	DF	(England)	Mark Kitching	11	0	0	1	0	0	0	0	0	12	0	0
30	FW	(England)	James Norwood	11	0	0	0	0	0	0	0	0	11	0	0
14	MF	(England)	Nathan Sheron	7	0	0	2	0	0	0	0	0	9	0	0
15	MF	(England)	Devarn Green	5	0	0	0	0	0	0	0	0	5	0	0
19	MF	(England)	Dan Gardner	5	0	0	0	0	0	0	0	0	5	0	0
24	FW	(England)	Joe Garner	5	0	0	0	0	0	0	0	0	5	0	0
10	FW	(England)	Joe Nuttall	4	0	0	0	0	0	0	0	0	4	0	0
22	MF	(England)	Brennan Dickenson	4	0	0	0	0	0	0	0	0	4	0	0
8	MF	(England)	Josh Lundstram	4	0	0	0	0	0	0	0	0	4	0	0
5	DF	(England)	Shaun Hobson	4	0	0	0	0	0	0	0	0	4	0	0
17	DF	(England)	Harrison McGahey	4	0	0	0	0	0	0	0	0	4	0	0
16	DF	(England)	Charlie Raglan	3	0	0	0	0	0	0	0	0	3	0	0
32	DF	(England)	Tom Conlon	3	0	0	0	0	0	0	0	0	3	0	0
18	MF	(England)	Ben Tollitt	1	0	0	0	0	0	0	0	0	1	0	0
25	FW	(England)	Alex Reid	1	0	0	0	0	0	0	0	0	1	0	0
23	DF	(Wales)	Kieron Freeman	1	0	0	0	0	0	0	0	0	1	0	0
24	FW	(England)	Josh Stones	1	0	0	0	0	0	0	0	0	1	0	0
1	GK	(England)	Magnus Norman	1	0	0	0	0	0	0	0	0	1	0	0
19	MF	(England)	Dan Gardner	1	0	0	0	0	0	0	0	0	1	0	0
2	DF	(England)	Sai Sachdev	1	0	0	0	0	0	0	0	0	1	0	0
13	GK	(England)	Mathew Hudson	1	0	0	0	0	0	0	0	0	1	0	0
29	FW	(Scotland)	Andrew Dallas	1	0	0	0	0	0	0	0	0	1	0	0
Total				104	3	2	3	0	0	0	0	0	107	3	2

== Transfers ==
=== Transfers in ===
Date	Position	Nationality	Name	From	Fee	Ref.
Pre-season	MF	(England)	Josh Lundstram	(England) Altrincham	Undisclosed fee	
Pre-season	FW	(England)	Kurt Willoughby	(England) Chester	Free transfer	
Pre-season	MF	(England)	Dan Ward	(England) Gateshead	Free transfer	
Pre-season	DF	(England)	Shaun Hobson	(England) Southend United	Free transfer	
Pre-season	DF	(England)	Charlie Raglan	(England) Cheltenham Town	Free transfer	
Pre-season	MF	(England)	Brennan Dickenson	–	Free transfer	
Pre-season	FW	(England)	James Norwood	(England) Barnsley	Undisclosed fee	
11 August 2023	DF	(Wales)	Kieron Freeman	–	Free transfer	
3 November 2023	GK	(England)	Dan Langley	–	Free transfer	
9 January 2024	MF	(England)	Tom Conlon	(England) Port Vale	Undisclosed	
19 January 2024	MF	(Wales)	Oli Hammond	(England) Nottingham Forest	Undisclosed	
31 January 2024	FW	(England)	Joe Garner	(England) Carlisle United	Undisclosed	

=== Transfers out ===
Date	Position	Nationality	Name	To	Fee	Ref.
Pre-season	GK	(Canada)	Jayson Leutwiler	(England) Port Vale	Free transfer	
Pre-season	MF	(England)	Luke Burgess	–	Released	
31 August 2023	MF	(England)	John Rooney	–	Released	
2 January 2024	DF	(Wales)	Kieron Freeman	–	End of contract	

=== Loans in ===
Date from	Position	Nationality	Name	From	Date until	Ref.
15 December 2023	FW	(England)	Josh Stones	(England) Wigan Athletic F.C.	2 January 2024 (Note: Stones was initially on loan until 12 January 2024 but was recalled early after suffering an injury.)	
2 January 2024	FW	(England)	Ethan Walker	(England) Blackburn Rovers F.C.	End of season	
15 January 2024	DF	(England)	Sai Sachdev	(England) Sheffield United F.C.	End of season	
22 January 2024	FW	(Scotland)	Andrew Dallas	(England) Barnsley F.C.	End of season	

=== Loans out ===
Date from	Position	Nationality	Name	To	Date until	Ref.
7 July 2023	DF	(England)	Jordan Windass	(England) Darlington	End of season	
11 July 2023	MF	(England)	Kofi Moore	(England) Workington	7 January 2024	
15 July 2023	FW	(England)	Jake Forshaw	(England) Colne	September 2023 (Note: Forshaw was initially announced as being on loan until January 2024 but it was confirmed on 5 September 2023 that he had moved to Farsley Celtic.)	
19 July 2023	DF	(England)	Frazer Cookson	(England) Northwich Victoria	January 2024 (Note: Cookson was initially announced as being on loan until 2 October 2023 but returned to Oldham in January 2024.)	
15 August 2023	DF	(Portugal)	Benny Couto	(Wales) TNS	September 2023 (Note: Couto was initially announced as being on loan until January 2024 but it was confirmed on 5 September 2023 that he had returned to Oldham.)	
24 August 2023	DF	(England)	Llyton Chapman	(England) Northwich Victoria	October 2023 (Note: Chapman moved to Chadderton in October 2023.)	
2 September 2023	MF	(England)	Ollie Havens	(England) New Mills	November 2023	
5 September 2023	FW	(England)	Jake Forshaw	(England) Farsley Celtic	November 2023 (Note: Forshaw moved to Guiseley in November 2023.)	
23 September 2023	DF	(Portugal)	Benny Couto	(England) Ashton United	End of season (Note: Couto was initially on loan until 23 October 2023 but it was confirmed on 20 October 2023 that this had been extended until the end of the season.)	
6 October 2023	DF	(England)	Llyton Chapman	(England) Chadderton	TBC	
7 November 2023	MF	(England)	Ben Tollitt	(England) Kidderminster Harriers	January 2024	
17 November 2023	FW	(England)	Jake Forshaw	(England) Guiseley	21 December 2023 (Note: Forshaw was initially on loan until the end of the season but it was confirmed on 21 December 2023 that he had returned to Oldham.)	
17 November 2023	MF	(England)	Kofi Moore	(England) Guiseley	15 December 2023 (Note: Moore was initially on loan until the end of the season but it was confirmed on 15 December 2023 that he had returned to Oldham.)	
12 December 2023	GK	(England)	Dan Langley	(England) Blyth Spartans	End of season (Note: Langley was initially on loan until 12 January 2024 but it was confirmed on 9 January 2024 that the loan had been extended to the end of the season.)	
1 January 2024	MF	(England)	Kofi Moore	(England) Guiseley	End of season	
11 January 2024	DF	(England)	Oliver Kilner	(England) Bury	End of season	
1 February 2024	FW	(England)	Joe Nuttall	(England) Cheltenham Town	End of season	
1 February 2024	FW	(England)	Kurt Willoughby	(Scotland) Ayr United	End of season	
2 February 2024	MF	(England)	Brennan Dickenson	(England) Hartlepool United	End of season	
9 February 2024	MF	(England)	Ben Tollitt	(England) Chester	End of season	
