= 2022–23 Oldham Athletic A.F.C. season =

Oldham Athletic
2022–23 season
- Chairman: Frank Rothwell
- Head coach: John Sheridan (until 17 September); David Unsworth (from 20 September)
- Stadium: Boundary Park
- National League: 12th
- FA Cup: First round
- FA Trophy: Fourth round
- Top goalscorer: League: Mike Fondop (11); All: Mike Fondop (13)
- Highest home attendance: 9,496
- Lowest home attendance: 5,100
- Average home league attendance: 6,660

The 2022–23 season was the 128th in Oldham Athletic's history and the club's first season outside the Football League since 1906-07. The club competed in the National League, the FA Cup and the FA Trophy.

Pre-season commenced with uncertainty over the future of the club lingering following relegation from the Football League. Abdallah Lemsagam had announced in January 2022 that he was willing to sell Oldham Athletic, but no further announcement had been made as preparations began for the new season. On 24 May 2022 it was announced that only three of Boundary Park's stands would be in use during the 2022/23 season, with the North Stand remaining unopened.

Then, on the day that the new squad met to commence pre-season training, it was announced that Abdallah Lemsagam and Simon Blitz had agreed to sell both the football club (owned by Lemsagam) and the stadium and its surrounding land (owned by Blitz's company Brass Bank Limited). The announcement stated that the target date for completion of the purchase was within four weeks and that the buyer would be a longstanding successful local business.

Frank Rothwell, the founder of Manchester Cabins, was announced as Oldham Athletic’s new owner and chairman on 28 July 2022. Rothwell was introduced at a media conference alongside his fellow directors Peter Norbury, Sue Schofield, Darren Royle and Joe Royle, as well as the club's manager, John Sheridan.

The season therefore started with a positive atmosphere descending over Boundary Park, exemplified by the procession and celebrations which preceded the first home match, against Dorking Wanderers on 14 August 2022. However, following a sequence of indifferent results, it was announced on 15 September 2022 that manager John Sheridan would leave the club after the subsequent game against Eastleigh. Sheridan ended his long association with the club on a high after a last-gasp 3–2 win and was replaced three days later by David Unsworth.

Unsworth's team struggled at first and a series of new signings and loan players were introduced over the first few months, with Oldham languishing in the relegation zone over the Christmas period. The Latics rallied over the last few weeks of the season, ultimately pulling themselves safely clear of relegation and finishing in 12th position, with the final home game of the season against Bromley seeing central defender and 41 year-old former club captain Peter Clarke being introduced by Unsworth to play as a centre forward for the last fifteen minutes in his final game for the club.

== Players ==
=== Squad at the end of the season ===
As of 10 June 2023

No	Pos	Nat	Name	Age	Debut	Apps	Starts	Subs	Goal	Yellow card	Red card	Notes
1	GK	(Canada)	Jayson Leutwiler	34	28 Aug 2021	31	31	0	0	1	0	
2	DF	(England)	Jordan Clarke	31	7 Aug 2021	67	66	1	1	15	1	
3	DF	(Antigua and Barbuda)	Zaine Francis-Angol	29	6 Aug 2022	8	7	1	0	0	0	
4	DF	(England)	Liam Hogan	34	6 Aug 2022	36	36	0	1	8	0	Captain
5	DF	(England)	Harrison McGahey	27	25 Sep 2021	36	34	2	1	5	0	
6	MF	(Saint Kitts and Nevis)	Lois Maynard	34	8 Oct 2022	13	11	2	0	1	0	
8	MF	(England)	Dan Gardner	33	19 Aug 2017	95	87	8	4	24	1	
9	FW	(England)	Chris Porter	39	6 Aug 2005	79	63	16	32	2	0	
11	FW	(Barbados)	Hallam Hope	29	14 Aug 2021	64	48	16	8	5	0	
13	GK	(England)	Mathew Hudson	24	18 Mar 2023	4	4	0	0	0	0	Signed 02/12/22
14	DF	(England)	Nathan Sheron	25	6 Aug 2022	50	50	0	3	9	0	
15	FW	(England)	Devarn Green	26	18 Feb 2023	15	12	3	3	1	0	Signed 17/02/23
16	MF	(England)	Mark Shelton	26	24 Jan 2023	20	20	0	1	3	0	Signed 20/01/23
17	MF	(England)	John Rooney	32	1 Oct 2022	36	28	8	2	6	0	
18	MF	(England)	Ben Tollitt	28	6 Aug 2022	40	32	8	8	5	0	
19	GK	(England)	Magnus Norman	26	6 Aug 2022	45	45	0	0	1	0	
20	FW	(Cameroon)	Mike Fondop	29	5 Feb 2022	42	23	19	15	3	2	
21	FW	(Germany)	Bassala Sambou	25	18 Mar 2023	9	6	3	2	1	0	Signed 17/03/23
22	DF	(England)	Jordan Windass	23	20 Aug 2022	1	0	1	0	0	0	
25	FW	(England)	Alex Reid	27	3 Dec 2022	20	14	6	4	2	0	Signed 22/11/22
26	DF	(England)	Mark Kitching	27	6 Nov 2022	33	33	0	2	2	0	Signed 31/10/22
27	FW	(England)	Timmy Abraham	22	29 Oct 2022	18	5	13	2	3	0	Loan from 28/10/22
29	FW	(England)	Junior Luamba	20	29 Dec 2020	33	14	19	2	3	0	
32	DF	(England)	Will Sutton	20	10 Nov 2020	31	30	1	3	4	0	
33	DF	(Portugal)	Benny Couto	19	31 Aug 2021	40	25	15	1	2	0	
36	MF	(England)	Ellis Chapman	22	19 Nov 2022	25	16	9	3	2	0	Loan from 17/11/22
38	DF	(Republic of Ireland)	Trey Turner	19	4 Jan 2022	1	1	0	0	0	0	
41	DF	(England)	Oliver Kilner	19	n/a	0	0	0	0	0	0	
42	DF	(England)	Peter Clarke	41	6 Aug 2016	142	136	6	18	26	2	Loan from 11/11/22
44	DF	(England)	Josef Yarney	25	7 Jan 2023	23	22	1	2	6	0	Signed 07/01/23
45	FW	(England)	Joe Nuttall	26	26 Dec 2022	24	24	0	7	4	0	Signed 09/12/22

=== Out on loan ===
No	Pos	Nat	Name	Age	Debut	Apps	Starts	Subs	Goal	Yellow card	Red card	Notes
7	MF	(England)	Jack Stobbs	26	7 Aug 2021	44	28	16	2	6	0	
10	MF	(England)	Luke Burgess	24	13 Aug 2022	12	4	8	1	2	0	
37	MF	(England)	Joe Edwards	19	n/a	0	0	0	0	0	0	

=== Left the club during the season ===
No	Pos	Nat	Name	Age	Debut	Apps	Starts	Subs	Goal	Yellow card	Red card	Notes
13	FW	(England)	Joe McGlynn	20	13 Sep 2022	2	0	2	0	0	0	Loan from 08/09/22 to 09/10/22
15	DF	(England)	Mitchell Roberts	22	26 Aug 2022	10	10	0	0	2	0	Loan from 25/08/22 to 01/01/23
16	MF	(England)	Charlie Cooper	26	6 Aug 2022	18	14	4	0	5	0	Released on 01/01/23
21	MF	(England)	Oscar Threlkeld	29	26 Aug 2022	8	8	0	1	5	0	Loan from 25/09/22 to 01/01/23
23	DF	(England)	Charlie Wellens	20	3 Sep 2022	6	4	2	1	0	0	Loan from 02/09/22 to 08/01/23
24	DF	(Republic of Ireland)	David Okagbue	19	3 Sep 2022	12	12	0	1	1	0	Loan from 02/09/22 to 01/01/23
25	FW	(Republic of Ireland)	Conor Carty	21	25 Oct 2022	4	0	4	0	0	0	Loan from 21/10/22 to 21/11/22
28	MF	(England)	Sydie Peck	18	12 Nov 2022	11	10	1	0	2	0	Loan from 10/22/22 to 30/01/23
31	DF	(England)	James Carragher	20	17 Sep 2022	6	6	0	0	0	0	Loan from 16/09/22 to 01/11/22
34	MF	(Republic of Ireland)	Harry Vaughan	19	23 Feb 2021	41	11	30	2	1	0	Sold on 31/01/23

== Competitions ==
Oldham Athletic played in the National League in the 2022–23 season, the club's first season outside the Football League since 1906-07. It entered the FA Cup in the Fourth Qualifying Round and will take part in the FA Trophy, joining in the Third Round.

=== National League ===
==== League table ====
Pos	Team	Pld	W	D	L	GF	GA	GD	Pts
10	Dagenham & Redbridge	46	18	9	19	61	72	−11	63
11	FC Halifax Town	46	16	13	17	49	48	+1	61
12	Oldham Athletic	46	16	13	17	63	64	−1	61
13	Wealdstone	46	16	12	18	57	72	−15	60
14	Gateshead	46	15	15	16	67	62	+5	59 (Note: Gateshead were deducted one point for playing an ineligible player.)

Rules for classification: 1) Points; 2) Goal difference; 3) Number of goals scored; 4) Number of matches won; 5) Head-to-head results

==== Results summary ====
Overall								Home						Away					
Pld	W	D	L	GF	GA	GD	Pts	W	D	L	GF	GA	GD	W	D	L	GF	GA	GD
46	16	13	17	63	64	−1	61	11	6	6	37	30	+7	5	7	11	26	34	−8

Last updated: 10 June 2023.

==== Results by matchday ====
Matchday	1	2	3	4	5	6	7	8	9	10	11	12	13	14	15	16	17	18	19	20	21	22	23	24	25	26	27	28	29	30	31	32	33	34	35	36	37	38	39	40	41	42	43	44	45	46
Ground	A	H	H	A	H	A	H	A	H	A	H	H	A	H	A	A	H	A	A	A	H	A	H	A	H	A	H	H	H	H	A	A	A	H	H	A	A	H	A	A	H	A	H	H	A	H
Result	D	W	L	L	W	D	L	L	W	L	L	D	D	W	L	L	L	D	L	L	W	L	D	W	W	D	L	W	D	W	L	W	W	L	W	L	D	D	D	L	D	W	W	W	W	D
Position	15	7	10	16	10	15	14	16	14	15	17	16	18	16	18	19	21	21	23	23	21	22	20	20	20	20	20	19	19	15	17	15	15	15	14	14	15	15	15	15	17	15	14	12	10	12

Updated to match(es) played on 12 April 2023. Source: bbc.co.uk
A = Away; H = Home; W = Win; D = Draw; L = Loss

==== Matches ====
Oldham's fixtures were announced on 6 July 2022.

6 August 2022 1	Torquay United	0–0	Oldham Athletic	Torquay
15:00 BST	Omar (yellow card) 30'; Marshall (yellow card) 50'; McGavin (yellow card) 67'; Wyatt (yellow card) 71'	Report	Hogan (yellow card) 43'; Gardner (yellow card) 55' (yellow-red card) 74'	Stadium: Plainmoor; Attendance: 3,690; Referee: Lee Collins

13 August 2022 2	Oldham Athletic	3–2	Dorking Wanderers	Oldham
17:20 BST	Hope 12'; Porter 53'; Tollitt 66'; Luamba (yellow card) 84'	Report	McShane (yellow card) 45'; Taylor (yellow card) 55' (goal) 82'; Philpott (yellow card) 66'; Rutherford 86'	Stadium: Boundary Park; Attendance: 8,412; Referee: Elliot Swallow

16 August 2022 3	Oldham Athletic	1–2	Wealdstone	Oldham
19:45 BST	Gardner (yellow card) 13'; Tollitt 48'	Report	Browne 10'; Allarakhia 17'; Allarakhia (yellow card) 42'; Habergham (yellow card) 81'; Charles (yellow card) 86'	Stadium: Boundary Park; Attendance: 6,869; Referee: Andrew Miller

20 August 2022 4	Southend United	1–0	Oldham Athletic	Southend
15:00 BST	Mooney 30'	Report		Stadium: Roots Hall; Attendance: 5,414; Referee: Adrian Quelch

26 August 2022 5	Oldham Athletic	2–1	Aldershot Town	Oldham
19:45 BST	Gardner 20'; Threlkeld (yellow card) 32'; Gardner (yellow card) 88'; Hope 90'; Tollitt (yellow card) 90'	Report	Amaluzor 28'; Phillips (yellow card) 90'	Stadium: Boundary Park; Attendance: 6,635; Referee: Steven Copeland

29 August 2022 6	York City	1–1	Oldham Athletic	York
15:00 BST	Kouhyar (yellow card) 6'; Dyson 73'	Report	Roberts (yellow card) 31'; Hope 47'; Threlkeld (yellow card) 89'	Stadium: York Community Stadium; Attendance: 6,833; Referee: Matthew Dicicco

3 September 2022 7	Oldham Athletic	0–2	Chesterfield	Oldham
15:00 BST	Tollitt (yellow card) 14'; Roberts (yellow card) 57'; Threlkeld (yellow card) 73'; Clarke (yellow card) 77'	Report	Quigley 1'; King 8' (yellow card) 79'	Stadium: Boundary Park; Attendance: 7,852; Referee: Lewis Smith

10 September 2022 P	Boreham Wood	P-P	Oldham Athletic	Borehamwood
15:00 BST		Report		Stadium: Meadow Park

13 September 2022 8	Woking	3–0	Oldham Athletic	Woking
19:45 BST	Cuthbert (yellow card) 10'; Ince (yellow card) 14'; Johnson 19', 54'; Wilkinson 28'	Report	Cooper (yellow card) 67'; Fondop (yellow card) 90'	Stadium: Kingfield Stadium; Attendance: 1,950; Referee: Wayne Cartmel

17 September 2022 9	Oldham Athletic	3–2	Eastleigh	Oldham
15:00 BST	Burgess 3'; Sheron (yellow card) 12'; Fondop 64'; Wellens 89'	Report	Whitehall 29', 38' (yellow card) 76'	Stadium: Boundary Park; Attendance: 6,637; Referee: Aaron Jackson

24 September 2022 10	Bromley	3–0	Oldham Athletic	Bromley
15:00 BST	Sowunmi 33'; Hannam 39'; Fondop 19' (o.g.)	Report		Stadium: Hayes Lane; Attendance: 3,628; Referee: Gareth Rhodes

1 October 2022 11	Oldham Athletic	1–2	Wrexham	Oldham
15:00 BST	Fondop 26' (yellow card) 49'; Sheron (yellow card) 31'; Clarke (yellow card) 69'; Carragher (yellow card) 90+1'	Report	Tozer 85'; Lee (yellow card) 90+3'; Mullin 90+6' (pen.)	Stadium: Boundary Park; Attendance: 9,496; Referee: Matthew Dicicco

4 October 2022 12	Oldham Athletic	2–2	Scunthorpe United	Oldham
19:45 BST	Okagbue 7'; Tollitt 75' (pen.); Burgess (yellow card) 90+3'	Report	Nuttall 26' (yellow card) 45+2'; Apter 44'; Ogle (yellow card) 67'	Stadium: Boundary Park; Attendance: 6,074; Referee: David Richardson

8 October 2022 13	Maidenhead United	1–1	Oldham Athletic	Maidenhead
15:00 BST	De Havilland (yellow card) 55'; Acquah (yellow card) 62'; Adams 75' (pen.); Massey (yellow card) 76'; Upward (yellow card) 89'; Barratt (yellow card) 90+5'	Report	Tollitt 34'; Cooper (yellow card) 43'; Okagbue (yellow card) 62'	Stadium: York Road; Referee: Lloyd Wood

22 October 2022 14	Oldham Athletic	2–0	Yeovil Town	Oldham
15:00 BST	Threlkeld 5'; Sheron (yellow card) 49'; Fondop 73'; Tollitt (yellow card) 78'	Report	D'Ath (yellow card) 75'	Stadium: Boundary Park; Attendance: 6,483; Referee: Greg Rollason

25 October 2022 15	Altrincham	1–0	Oldham Athletic	Altrincham
19:45 BST	Conn-Clarke 71'; Kaja (yellow card) 90+1'	Report	Threlkeld (yellow card) 36'	Stadium: Moss Lane; Attendance: 3,553; Referee: Edward Duckworth

29 October 2022 16	FC Halifax Town	2–1	Oldham Athletic	Halifax
17:20 BST	Dieseruvwe 64'; Spence (yellow card) 73'; Arthur (yellow card) 79'; Harker 85'	Report	Clarke (yellow card) 55'; Threlkeld (yellow card) 63'; Cooper (yellow card) 73'; Rooney (yellow card) 76'; Tollitt 77'	Stadium: The Shay; Attendance: 4,202; Referee: Andrew Miller

8 November 2022 P	Oldham Athletic	P-P	Gateshead	Oldham
15:00 BST		Report		Stadium: Boundary Park

12 November 2022 17	Oldham Athletic	0–2	Barnet	Oldham
15:00 GMT	Clarke (yellow card) 38'; Maynard (yellow card) 42'; Sheron (yellow card) 83'; Tollitt (yellow card) 90+1'	Report	De Havilland (yellow card) 20'; Kanu 57' (yellow card) 83'; Pritchard 87'	Stadium: Boundary Park; Attendance: 6,014; Referee: Michael Barlow

19 November 2022 18	Maidstone United	0–0	Oldham Athletic	Maidstone
15:00 GMT	Corne (yellow card) 90+1'	Report	Gardner (yellow card) 65'; Clarke (yellow card) 74'	Stadium: Gallagher Stadium; Attendance: 2,772; Referee: Paul Johnson

26 November 2022 P	Oldham Athletic	P-P	Dagenham & Redbridge	Oldham
15:00 BST		Report		Stadium: Boundary Park

3 December 2022 19	Solihull Moors	2–1	Oldham Athletic	Solihull
12:30 GMT	Osborne (yellow card) 21'; Coker (yellow card) 45+1'; Sbarra 46'; Dallas 49'; Jones (yellow card) 51'	Report	Hogan (yellow card) 24'; Peck (yellow card) 34'; Rooney 89'	Stadium: Damson Park; Attendance: 2,005; Referee: Steven Copeland

6 December 2022 20	Boreham Wood	2–1	Oldham Athletic	Borehamwood
19:45 GMT	Newton (yellow card) 38'; Payne (yellow card) 49'; Ndlovu 61', 90'	Report	Peck (yellow card) 31'; Hogan (yellow card) 52'; Tollitt 83'	Stadium: Meadow Park; Attendance: 801; Referee: Jason Richardson

11 December 2022 21	Oldham Athletic	3–2	Torquay United	Oldham
15:00 GMT	Crowe 11' (o.g.); Tollitt 64'; Abraham 74'	Report	Goodwin 51' (yellow card) 71'; Jarvis 68' (pen.)	Stadium: Boundary Park; Attendance: 5,615; Referee: Paul Marsden

13 December 2022 P	Wealdstone	P-P	Oldham Athletic	Ruislip
19:45 BST		Report		Stadium: Grosvenor Vale

26 December 2022 22	Notts County	4–1	Oldham Athletic	Nottingham
15:00 GMT	Scott 4', 43'; Cameron 9'; Rodrigues 41'	Report	Nuttall 5'; Gardner (yellow card) 48'	Stadium: Meadow Lane; Attendance: 9,789; Referee: Andrew Miller

1 January 2023 23	Oldham Athletic	2–2	Notts County	Oldham
15:00 GMT	Sheron 53'; Clarke (yellow card) 61'; Nuttall 79' (pen.); Rooney (yellow card) 86'	Report	Cameron (yellow card) 38'; Langstaff 50'; Scott 57'	Stadium: Boundary Park; Attendance: 7,312; Referee: David Richardson

7 January 2023 24	Dorking Wanderers	1–5	Oldham Athletic	Dorking
15:00 GMT	Mcshane 8'; McManus (yellow card) 54'	Report	Fondop 18', 34', 56'; Chapman (yellow card) 33' (goal) 64'; Clarke 45+2'	Stadium: Meadowbank; Attendance: 2,230; Referee: Farai Hallam

17 January 2023 P	Wealdstone	P-P	Oldham Athletic	Ruislip
19:45 GMT		Report		Stadium: Grosvenor Vale

21 January 2023 P	Oldham Athletic	P-P	Southend United	Oldham
15:00 GMT		Report		Stadium: Boundary Park

24 January 2023 25	Oldham Athletic	2–0	York City	Oldham
19:45 GMT	Sheron (yellow card) 39'; Yarney 41'; Clarke (yellow card) 48'; Abraham 77'	Report	Hancox (yellow card) 40'; Crookes (yellow card) 90+4'	Stadium: Boundary Park; Attendance: 5,930; Referee: Greg Rollason

28 January 2023 26	Aldershot Town	1–1	Oldham Athletic	Aldershot
15:00 GMT	Effiong 28'; Harfield (yellow card) 89'	Report	Fondop 48' (yellow card) 49'; Yarney (yellow card) 56'; Nuttall (yellow card) 64'	Stadium: Recreation Ground; Attendance: 2,157; Referee: Gary Parsons

4 February 2023 27	Oldham Athletic	0-1	FC Halifax Town	Oldham
15:00 GMT	Hogan (yellow card) 36'; Sheron (yellow card) 45'; Fondop 53; Yarney (yellow card) 67'; Abraham (yellow card) 76'	Report	Dieseruvwe 68'	Stadium: Boundary Park; Attendance: 7,459; Referee: Dean Watson

7 February 2023 28	Oldham Athletic	4-2	Dagenham & Redbridge	Oldham
19:45 GMT	Nuttall (yellow card) 26' (goal) 89'; Sheron 56'; Yarney 60'; Chapman 90'	Report	Morais 29'; Onariase (yellow card) 59'; Effiong (yellow card) 77'; Robinson 84'	Stadium: Boundary Park; Attendance: 5,100; Referee: Aaron Bannister

11 February 2023 P	Barnet	P-P	Oldham Athletic	London
15:00 GMT		Report		Stadium: The Hive Stadium

14 February 2023 29	Oldham Athletic	2-2	Gateshead	Oldham
19:45 GMT	Rooney 50'; Reid 64'; Abraham (yellow card) 90'	Report	Campbell (yellow card) 57'; Conteh 81'; Richardson 83'; Ward (yellow card) 87'	Stadium: Boundary Park; Attendance: 5,845; Referee: Edward Duckworth

18 February 2023 30	Oldham Athletic	2-0	Maidstone United	Oldham
15:00 GMT	Shelton 50'; Reid (yellow card) 88' (goal) 90'	Report	Alabi (yellow card) 44'; Fowler (yellow card) 88'	Stadium: Boundary Park; Attendance: 6,409; Referee: Scott Simpson

21 February 2023 31	Gateshead	2-1	Oldham Athletic	Gateshead
19:45 GMT	Hogan 19' (o.g.); Dinanga 79'	Report	Nuttall (yellow card) 45'; Sutton 54'	Stadium: Gateshead International Stadium; Attendance: 1,118; Referee: Aaron Jackson

25 February 2023 32	Chesterfield	0-1	Oldham Athletic	Chesterfield
15:00 GMT	Oldaker (yellow card) 73'; Mandeville (yellow card) 77'	Report	Green 6'; Norman (yellow card) 75'; Kitching (yellow card) 88'	Stadium: Technique Stadium; Attendance: 7,347; Referee: Paul Marsden

28 February 2023 33	Barnet	1–3	Oldham Athletic	London
19:45 GMT	Kanu 40'; Senior (yellow card) 56'; Beard (yellow card) 79'	Report	Kitching 5'; Chapman (yellow card) 37'; Yarney (yellow card) 58'; Fondop 62'; Hogan (yellow card) 77'; Rooney (yellow card) 77'; Clarke 90+1'	Stadium: The Hive Stadium; Attendance: 1,299; Referee: Robert Massey-Ellis

4 March 2023 34	Oldham Athletic	0–2	Boreham Wood	Oldham
15:00 GMT	Hogan (yellow card) 19'	Report	Broadbent (yellow card) 46'; Fyfield (yellow card) 68'; Payne 82'; Lewis 90' (yellow card) 90'	Stadium: Boundary Park; Attendance: 6,382; Referee: Gareth Rhodes

7 March 2023 35	Oldham Athletic	1–0	Woking	Oldham
19:45 GMT	Sheron 90+2'	Report	Kellerman (yellow card) 80'; Moss (yellow card) 87'	Stadium: Boundary Park; Attendance: 5,347; Referee: Scott Jackson

11 March 2023 36	Eastleigh	1–0	Oldham Athletic	Eastleigh
15:00 GMT	Whitehall 72'	Report	Green (yellow card) 90+1'	Stadium: Silverlake Stadium; Attendance: 2,670; Referee: Wayne Cartmel

18 March 2023 37	Dagenham & Redbridge	1–1	Oldham Athletic	Dagenham
15:00 GMT	Bird 37'	Report	Yarney (yellow card) 57'; Fondop 84' (yellow card) 85'	Stadium: Victoria Road; Attendance: 1,659; Referee: Gary Parsons

25 March 2023 38	Oldham Athletic	1–1	Solihull Moors	Oldham
15:00 GMT	Kitching 13'; Rooney (yellow card) 70'; Abraham (yellow card) 88'	Report	Howe (yellow card) 88'; Stevens 90+4'	Stadium: Boundary Park; Attendance: 6,685; Referee: Michael Barlow

28 March 2023 39	Wealdstone	2–2	Oldham Athletic	Ruislip
19:45 GMT	Obiero (yellow card) 45'; Olomola 48'; Lo-Everton 57'; Howes (yellow card) 60'	Report	Nuttall 27', 61' (pen.) (yellow card) 85'; Yarney (yellow card) 90'	Stadium: Grosvenor Vale; Attendance: 1,137; Referee: Richie Watkins

1 April 2023 40	Wrexham	5–1	Oldham Athletic	Wrexham
15:00 BST	O'Connell 24'; Mullin 32', 70', 90+3'; Lee 49'	Report	Hogan 45+2'; Sheron (yellow card) 64'; Fondop (red card) 89'	Stadium: Racecourse Ground; Attendance: 9,910; Referee: James Durkin

7 April 2023 41	Oldham Athletic	2–2	Altrincham	Oldham
15:00 BST	Nuttall 22'; Sambou 74'	Report	Linney (yellow card) 17'; Byrne (yellow card) 77'; Jones (red card) 79'; Oyedele 81'; Sinclair 89'	Stadium: Boundary Park; Attendance: 7,391; Referee: Gareth Rhodes

10 April 2023 42	Scunthorpe United	0–2	Oldham Athletic	Scunthorpe
15:00 BST	Carver (yellow card) 90'	Report	Hogan (yellow card) 27'; Green 32'; Shelton (yellow card) 55'; Sambou 79' (pen.); Clarke (yellow card) 90'	Stadium: Glanford Park; Referee: Scott Jackson

15 April 2023 43	Oldham Athletic	1–0	Maidenhead United	Oldham
15:00 BST	Reid 3'; Shelton (yellow card) 24'; Sambou (yellow card) 33'; Yarney (yellow card) 61'; Sheron (yellow card) 85'	Report	Massey (yellow card) 45'	Stadium: Boundary Park; Attendance: 5,815; Referee: Scott Simpson

18 April 2023 44	Oldham Athletic	2–0	Southend United	Oldham
19:45 BST	Rooney (yellow card) 27'; Reid 43' (yellow card) 88'; Sutton (yellow card) 53'; Kitching (yellow card) 67'; Chapman 76'	Report		Stadium: Boundary Park; Referee: Greg Rollason

22 April 2023 45	Yeovil Town	0–3	Oldham Athletic	Yeovil
15:00 BST	Griffiths (yellow card) 45'; Cooper (yellow card) 76'	Report	Green 8'; Hogan (yellow card) 34'; Shelton (yellow card) 45'; Sheron (yellow card) 48'; Fondop 73', 88'	Stadium: Huish Park; Attendance: 4,016; Referee: Paul Johnson

29 April 2023 46	Oldham Athletic	1-1	Bromley	Oldham
15:00 BST	Nuttall 44'	Report	Vennings 79'	Stadium: Boundary Park; Attendance: 7,482; Referee: Richie Watkins

=== FA Cup ===
15 October 2022 Q4	Oldham Athletic	1–1	Chester	Oldham
15:00 BST	Fondop 8'	Report	Burke 78'	Stadium: Boundary Park; Attendance: 5,342; Referee: Scott Jackson

18 October 2022 Q4	Chester	2–2 (3–4 p)	Oldham Athletic	Chester
19:45 BST	Willoughby 59'; Roberts 99'	Report	Tollitt 10'; Fondop 119'	Stadium: Deva Stadium; Referee: Aaron Bannister
	Penalties
	Willoughby (penalty scored); Roberts (penalty missed); Stephenson (penalty scored); Hall (penalty missed); Devine (penalty scored)		Tollitt (penalty scored); Gardner (penalty scored); Okagbue (penalty scored); Fondop (penalty missed); Porter (penalty scored)

6 November 2022 1	Wrexham	3–0	Oldham Athletic	Wrexham
12:30 GMT	Dalby 10'; Mullin 25', 62'		Clarke (yellow card) 15'; Cooper (yellow card) 44'	Stadium: Racecourse Ground; Attendance: 9,113; Referee: Samuel Barrott

=== FA Trophy ===
20 December 2022 3	Oldham Athletic	0–0 (3–2 p)	Peterborough Sports	Oldham
19:45 GMT		Report		Stadium: Boundary Park; Attendance: 1,785; Referee: Matthew Corlett

14 January 2023 4	Gateshead	3–1	Oldham Athletic	Oldham (Note: The game was officially a home game for Gateshead but was played at Oldham's Boundary Park due to floodlight repairs at Gateshead International Stadium.)
15:00 GMT	Conteh 13'; Tinkler 86'; Olley 90'	Report	Clarke 13' (yellow card) 87' (yellow-red card) 87'	Stadium: Boundary Park; Attendance: 2,228; Referee: Edward Duckworth

== Transfers ==
=== Transfers in ===
Date	Position	Nationality	Name	From	Fee	Ref.
1 July 2022	DF	(England)	Liam Hogan	(England) Stockport County	Free transfer	
1 July 2022	FW	(England)	Chris Porter	(England) Crewe Alexandra	Free transfer	
1 July 2022	DF	(England)	Jordan Windass	(England) Bradford (Park Avenue)	Free transfer	
1 July 2022	MF	(England)	Luke Burgess	(England) Salford City	Free transfer	
1 July 2022	DF	(England)	Nathan Sheron	(England) Harrogate Town	Free transfer	
1 July 2022	GK	(England)	Magnus Norman	(England) Carlisle United	Free transfer	
2 July 2022	DF	(Antigua and Barbuda)	Zaine Francis-Angol	(England) Hartlepool United	Free transfer	
4 July 2022	MF	(England)	Lois Maynard	(England) Stockport County	Free transfer	
26 July 2022	MF	(England)	Ben Tollitt	-	Free transfer	
29 July 2022	MF	(England)	Dan Gardner	-	Free transfer	
4 August 2022	MF	(England)	Charlie Cooper	-	Free transfer	
27 September 2022	MF	(England)	John Rooney	(England) Barrow	Free transfer	
31 October 2022	DF	(England)	Mark Kitching	-	Free transfer	
22 November 2022	FW	(England)	Alex Reid	(England) Stockport County	Free transfer	
2 December 2022	GK	(England)	Mathew Hudson	(England) Buxton	Free transfer	
9 December 2022	FW	(England)	Joe Nuttall	(England) Scunthorpe United	Undisclosed Fee	
7 January 2023	DF	(England)	Josef Yarney	-	Free transfer	
20 January 2023	MF	(England)	Mark Shelton	(England) Hartlepool United	Undisclosed Fee	
17 February 2023	FW	(England)	Devarn Green	-	Free transfer	

=== Transfers out ===
Date	Position	Nationality	Name	To	Fee	Ref.
1 January 2023	MF	(England)	Charlie Cooper	(England) Yeovil Town	Free Transfer	
31 January 2023	MF	(Republic of Ireland)	Harry Vaughan	(England) Hull City	Undisclosed fee	
End of season	DF	(England)	Jordan Clarke	-	Released	
End of season	FW	(England)	Vani Da Silva	-	Released	
End of season	DF	(Antigua and Barbuda)	Zaine Francis-Angol	-	Released	
End of season	MF	(England)	Joe Edwards	-	Released	
End of season	DF	(England)	Oliver Kilner	-	Released	
End of season	MF	(Saint Kitts and Nevis)	Lois Maynard	-	Released	
End of season	FW	(England)	Chris Porter	-	Released	
End of season	MF	(England)	Jack Stobbs	-	Released	
End of season	DF	(Republic of Ireland)	Trey Turner	-	Released	
End of season	FW	(England)	Junior Luamba	-	Released	

=== Loans in ===
Date from	Position	Nationality	Name	From	Date until	Ref.
25 August 2022	MF	(England)	Oscar Threlkeld	(England) Bradford City	1 January 2023 (Note: Threlkeld was initially announced as being on loan until 2 January 2023 but his loan was confirmed on 1 January 2023 as having terminated.)	
25 August 2022	DF	(England)	Mitchell Roberts	(England) Birmingham City	1 January 2023	
2 September 2022	DF	(England)	Charlie Wellens	(England) Manchester United	8 January 2023	
2 September 2022	DF	(Republic of Ireland)	David Okagbue	(England) Stoke City	8 January 2023 (Note: Okagbue initially joined on loan until 28 September 2022.) (Note: Okagbue's loan was then confirmed on 1 January 2023 as having terminated.)	
8 September 2022	FW	(England)	Joe McGlynn	(England) Burnley	9 October 2022	
16 September 2022	DF	(England)	James Carragher	(England) Wigan Athletic	1 November 2022 (Note: Carragher joined on loan until 1 January 2023 but returned to Wigan Athletic early after suffering an injury.)	
21 October 2022	FW	(Republic of Ireland)	Conor Carty	(England) Bolton Wanderers	20 November 2022	
28 October 2022	FW	(England)	Timmy Abraham	(England) Walsall	End of season (Note: Abraham initially joined on loan until 1 January 2023.)	
10 November 2022	MF	(England)	Sydie Peck	(England) Sheffield United	30 January 2023 (Note: Peck's initial loan was extended from 9 December 2022 to 9 January 2023.) (Note: Peck's loan was further extended from 9 January 2023 to 9 February 2023.) (Note: Peck was then recalled early by Sheffield United on 30 January 2023.)	
11 November 2022	DF	(England)	Peter Clarke	(England) Walsall	End of season (Note: Peter Clarke initially joined on loan until 1 January 2023.)	
17 November 2022	MF	(England)	Ellis Chapman	(England) Cheltenham Town	End of season (Note: Chapman initially joined on loan until 17 December 2022.) (Note: Chapman then extended his loan for a further month.)	
17 March 2023	FW	(Germany)	Bassala Sambou	(England) Crewe Alexandra	End of season	

=== Loans out ===
Date from	Position	Nationality	Name	To	Date until	Ref.
14 December 2022	MF	(Republic of Ireland)	Harry Vaughan	(England) Radcliffe	18 January 2023 (Note: Vaughan originally joined Radcliffe on loan until 13 January 2023) (Note: Vaughan then extended his loan for a further month before being recalled early.)	
3 January 2023	DF	(England)	Will Sutton	(England) Radcliffe	6 January 2023 (Note: Sutton was recalled early from his loan.)	
11 January 2023	MF	(England)	Joe Edwards	(England) Mossley	11 March 2023 (Note: Edwards originally joined Mossley on loan until 11 February 2023)	
13 January 2023	DF	(England)	Josh Windass	(England) Buxton	13 February 2023	
14 March 2023	MF	(England)	Jack Stobbs	(England) Torquay United	End of season	
23 March 2023	MF	(England)	Luke Burgess	(England) Altrincham	End of season	

== Squad statistics ==
As of match played 29 April 2023

=== Appearances and goals ===
No.	Pos	Nat	Player	Total		National League		FA Cup		FA Trophy	
No.	Pos	Nat	Player	Apps	Goals	Apps	Goals	Apps	Goals	Apps	Goals
1	GK	(Canada) CAN	Jayson Leutwiler	2	0	0+0	0	1+0	0	1+0	0
2	DF	(England) ENG	Jordan Clarke	21	0	17+1	0	3+0	0	0+0	0
3	DF	(Antigua and Barbuda) ANT	Zaine Francis-Angol	8	0	7+0	0	0+1	0	0+0	0
4	DF	(England) ENG	Liam Hogan	36	1	34+0	1	0+0	0	2+0	0
5	DF	(England) ENG	Harrison McGahey	6	0	4+2	0	0+0	0	0+0	0
6	MF	(Saint Kitts and Nevis) SKN	Lois Maynard	13	0	7+2	0	3+0	0	1+0	0
7	MF	(England) ENG	Jack Stobbs	11	0	8+2	0	0+1	0	0+0	0
8	MF	(England) ENG	Dan Gardner	21	1	14+4	1	2+0	0	0+1	0
9	FW	(England) ENG	Chris Porter	4	1	3+0	1	0+1	0	0+0	0
10	MF	(England) ENG	Luke Burgess	12	1	4+7	1	0+1	0	0+0	0
11	FW	(Barbados) BRB	Hallam Hope	18	3	13+3	3	1+0	0	1+0	0
13	FW	(England) ENG	Joe McGlynn	2	0	0+2	0	0+0	0	0+0	0
13	GK	(England) ENG	Mathew Hudson	4	0	4+0	0	0+0	0	0+0	0
14	DF	(England) ENG	Nathan Sheron	50	3	45+0	3	3+0	0	2+0	0
15	DF	(England) ENG	Mitchell Roberts	10	3	9+0	3	1+0	0	0+0	0
15	FW	(England) ENG	Devarn Green	15	0	12+3	0	0+0	0	0+0	0
16	MF	(England) ENG	Charlie Cooper	18	0	12+3	0	2+1	0	0+0	0
16	MF	(England) ENG	Mark Shelton	20	1	20+0	1	0+0	0	0+0	0
17	MF	(England) ENG	John Rooney	36	2	24+8	2	3+0	0	1+0	0
18	MF	(England) ENG	Ben Tollitt	40	8	29+7	7	3+0	1	0+1	0
19	GK	(England) ENG	Magnus Norman	45	0	42+0	0	2+0	0	1+0	0
20	FW	(Cameroon) CMR	Mike Fondop	40	13	19+16	11	2+1	2	1+1	0
21	MF	(England) ENG	Oscar Threlkeld	8	1	8+0	1	0+0	0	0+0	0
21	FW	(Germany) GER	Bassala Sambou	9	2	6+3	2	0+0	0	0+0	0
22	DF	(England) ENG	Jordan Windass	1	0	0+1	0	0+0	0	0+0	0
23	DF	(England) ENG	Charlie Wellens	6	1	4+2	1	0+0	0	0+0	0
24	DF	(Republic of Ireland) IRL	David Okagbue	12	1	9+0	1	3+0	0	0+0	0
25	FW	(Republic of Ireland) IRL	Conor Carty	4	0	0+3	0	0+1	0	0+0	0
25	FW	(England) ENG	Alex Reid	20	4	13+5	4	0+0	0	1+1	0
26	DF	(England) ENG	Mark Kitching	33	2	30+0	2	1+0	0	2+0	0
27	FW	(England) ENG	Timmy Abraham	18	2	3+12	2	1+0	0	1+1	0
28	MF	(England) ENG	Sydie Peck	11	0	8+1	0	0+0	0	2+0	0
29	FW	(England) ENG	Junior Luamba	12	0	2+9	0	0+1	0	0+0	0
31	DF	(England) ENG	James Carragher	6	0	5+0	0	1+0	0	0+0	0
32	DF	(England) ENG	Will Sutton	20	1	20+0	1	0+0	0	0+0	0
33	DF	(Portugal) POR	Benny Couto	13	0	1+8	0	1+1	0	1+1	0
34	MF	(Republic of Ireland) IRL	Harry Vaughan	5	0	0+4	0	0+1	0	0+0	0
36	MF	(England) ENG	Ellis Chapman	25	3	15+9	3	0+0	0	1+0	0
42	DF	(England) ENG	Peter Clarke	18	3	11+5	2	0+0	0	2+0	1
44	DF	(England) ENG	Josef Yarney	23	2	21+1	2	0+0	0	1+0	0
45	FW	(England) ENG	Joe Nuttall	24	7	23+0	7	0+0	0	1+0	0

=== Disciplinary record ===
No.	Pos.	Nat.	Player	National League			FA Cup			FA Trophy			Total		
No.	Pos.	Nat.	Player	Yellow card	(yellow card) (yellow-red card)	Red card	Yellow card	(yellow card) (yellow-red card)	Red card	Yellow card	(yellow card) (yellow-red card)	Red card	Yellow card	(yellow card) (yellow-red card)	Red card
2	DF	(England)	Jordan Clarke	5	0	0	1	0	0	0	0	0	6	0	0
4	DF	(England)	Liam Hogan	8	0	0	0	0	0	0	0	0	8	0	0
6	MF	(England)	Lois Maynard	1	0	0	0	0	0	0	0	0	1	0	0
8	MF	(England)	Dan Gardner	4	1	0	0	0	0	0	0	0	4	1	0
10	MF	(England)	Luke Burgess	1	0	0	1	0	0	0	0	0	2	0	0
14	DF	(England)	Nathan Sheron	9	0	0	0	0	0	0	0	0	9	0	0
15	DF	(England)	Mitchell Roberts	2	0	0	0	0	0	0	0	0	2	0	0
15	FW	(England)	Devarn Green	1	0	0	0	0	0	0	0	0	1	0	0
16	MF	(England)	Charlie Cooper	3	0	0	2	0	0	0	0	0	5	0	0
16	MF	(England)	Mark Shelton	3	0	0	0	0	0	0	0	0	3	0	0
17	MF	(England)	John Rooney	5	0	0	1	0	0	0	0	0	6	0	0
18	MF	(England)	Ben Tollitt	4	0	0	1	0	0	0	0	0	5	0	0
19	GK	(England)	Magnus Norman	1	0	0	0	0	0	0	0	0	1	0	0
20	FW	(Cameroon)	Mike Fondop	3	0	2	0	0	0	0	0	0	3	0	2
21	MF	(England)	Oscar Threlkeld	5	0	0	0	0	0	0	0	0	5	0	0
21	FW	(Germany)	Bassala Sambou	1	0	0	0	0	0	0	0	0	1	0	0
24	DF	(Republic of Ireland)	David Okagbue	1	0	0	0	0	0	0	0	0	1	0	0
25	FW	(England)	Alex Reid	2	0	0	0	0	0	0	0	0	2	0	0
26	DF	(England)	Mark Kitching	2	0	0	0	0	0	0	0	0	2	0	0
27	FW	(England)	Timmy Abraham	3	0	0	0	0	0	0	0	0	3	0	0
28	MF	(England)	Sydie Peck	2	0	0	0	0	0	0	0	0	2	0	0
29	FW	(England)	Junior Luamba	1	0	0	0	0	0	0	0	0	1	0	0
32	DF	(England)	Will Sutton	1	0	0	0	0	0	0	0	0	1	0	0
33	DF	(Portugal)	Benny Couto	0	0	0	1	0	0	0	0	0	1	0	0
36	MF	(England)	Ellis Chapman	2	0	0	0	0	0	0	0	0	2	0	0
42	DF	(England)	Peter Clarke	3	0	0	0	0	0	0	1	0	3	1	0
44	DF	(England)	Josef Yarney	6	0	0	0	0	0	0	0	0	6	0	0
45	FW	(England)	Joe Nuttall	4	0	0	0	0	0	0	0	0	4	0	0
Total				83	1	2	7	0	0	0	1	0	90	2	2
