= Mathew Hudson =

English footballer (born 1998)

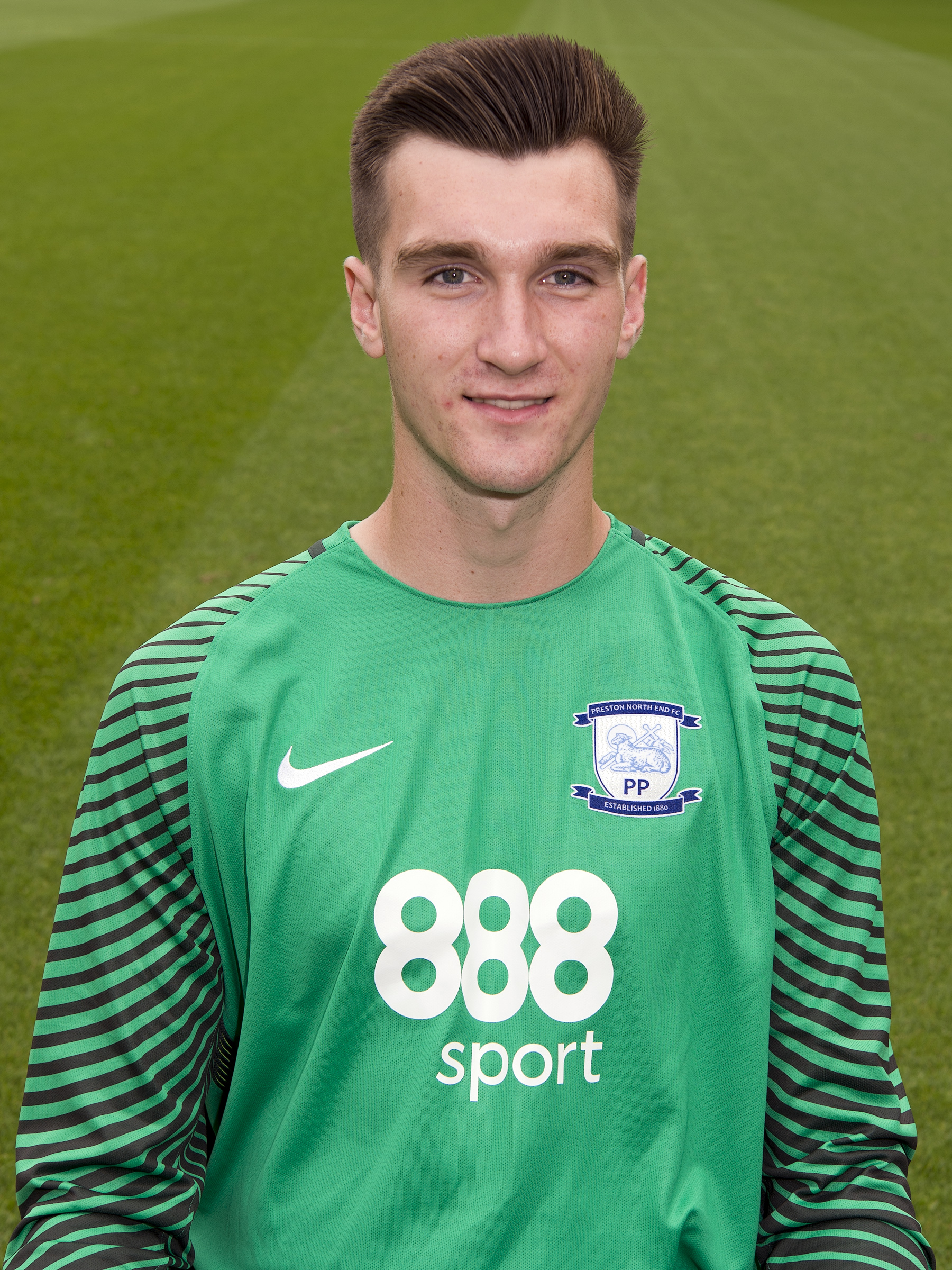
- Hudson with Preston North End in 2016

Personal information
- Full name: Mathew Anthony Hudson
- Date of birth: 29 July 1998 (age 28)
- Place of birth: Southport, England
- Height: 6 ft 4 in (1.93 m)
- Position: Goalkeeper

Team information
- Current team: Oldham Athletic
- Number: 1

Youth career
- –2015: Preston North End

Senior career*
Years	Team	Apps	(Gls)
2015–2022	Preston North End	1	(0)
2018–2019	→ Bury (loan)	0	(0)
2020	→ Bamber Bridge (loan)	3	(0)
2022	Buxton	0	(0)
2022–	Oldham Athletic	129	(0)
- * Club domestic league appearances and goals as of 25 May 2026 (UTC)

Mathew Anthony Hudson (born 29 July 1998) is an English professional footballer who plays as a goalkeeper for EFL League Two club Oldham Athletic. He started his career at Preston North End in 2015, and has had loan spells at Bury and Bamber Bridge.

== Early life ==
Hudson was born in Southport.

== Career ==
Having come through the club's academy, Hudson first appeared on the bench for Preston North End in early 2015 in an FA Cup fourth-round tie against Sheffield United, and made his professional debut aged 17 as a replacement for future England goalkeeper Jordan Pickford who was sent off in the 30th minute of a 1–0 away defeat at Leeds United on 20 December 2015. Leeds scored the only goal of the game through an Alan Browne own goal in the 46th minute, while Pickford's red card was later rescinded. Hudson signed his first professional contract in January 2016, with the deal lasting 18 months and having the option for a further year. He won Preston's scholar of the year award for the 2015–16 season.

He did not make a first-team appearance during the 2016–17 or 2017–18 seasons, but agreed a new two-year deal with the club in June 2018, and joined League Two side Bury on loan until January the following month. He made his debut for the club on 4 September 2020 in a defeat away to Rochdale in the EFL Trophy, and made a total of four appearances for Bury, all of which coming in the EFL Trophy.

With Hudson contract set to expire in summer 2020, it was extended by two years in June 2020. On 23 October 2020, he joined Bamber Bridge on loan alongside teammate Adam O'Reilly, until 28 November 2020. He made his debut for the club the following day in a 2–1 defeat at home to Bamber Bridge. Hudson was released at the end of his contract in June 2022.

=== Oldham Athletic ===
In December 2022, Hudson joined National League club Oldham Athletic following a spell with Buxton.

On 20 June 2025, after Oldham were promoted to League Two, the club announced the player had signed a new three-year deal. An impressive first season back in the Football League saw Hudson named in the League Two Team of the Season for the 2025–26 season. He was also named in the PFA League Two Team of the Year on 25 August 2026 at the PFA Awards 2026.

== Career statistics ==
As of 25 May 2026

Appearances and goals by club, season and competition
Club	Season	League			FA Cup		EFL Cup		Other		Total	
Club	Season	Division	Apps	Goals	Apps	Goals	Apps	Goals	Apps	Goals	Apps	Goals
Preston North End	2015–16	Championship	1	0	0	0	0	0	0	0	1	0
Preston North End	2016–17	Championship	0	0	0	0	0	0	0	0	0	0
Preston North End	2017–18	Championship	0	0	0	0	0	0	0	0	0	0
Preston North End	2018–19	Championship	0	0	0	0	0	0	0	0	0	0
Preston North End	2019–20	Championship	0	0	0	0	0	0	0	0	0	0
Preston North End	2020–21	Championship	0	0	0	0	0	0	0	0	0	0
Preston North End	Total		1	0	0	0	0	0	0	0	1	0
Bury (loan)	2018–19	League Two	0	0	0	0	0	0	4 (Note: Appearance(s) in EFL Trophy)	0	4	0
Bury (loan)	Total		0	0	0	0	0	0	4	0	4	0
Bamber Bridge (loan)	2020-21	Northern Premier Division	3	0	0	0	0	0	1 (Note: Appearance(s) in EFL Trophy)	0	4	0
Bamber Bridge (loan)	Total		3	0	0	0	0	0	1	0	4	0
Buxton	2022-23	National League North	0	0	0	0	0	0	0	0	0	0
Buxton	Total		0	0	0	0	0	0	0	0	0	0
Oldham Athletic	2022–23	National League	4	0	0	0	0	0	0	0	4	0
Oldham Athletic	2023–24	National League	44	0	1	0	0	0	0	0	45	0
Oldham Athletic	2024–25	National League	35	0	2	0	0	0	3 (Note: Appearance(s) in National League play-offs)	0	40	0
Oldham Athletic	2025–26	League Two	46	0	2	0	1	0	0	0	49	0
Oldham Athletic	Total		129	0	5	0	1	0	3	0	138	0
Career total			133	0	5	0	1	0	8	0	147	0

== Honours ==
Oldham Athletic

- National League play-offs: 2025

Individual

- EFL League Two Team of the Season: 2025–26
- PFA Team of the Year: 2025–26 League Two
