= Kitchings =

Kitchings is a surname. Notable people with the surname include:

- Desmond Kitchings (born 1978), American football coach
- Grant Kitchings (1938–2005), American singer
- Irene Kitchings (c. 1908–1975), American jazz pianist

== See also ==
- Kitching, surname
