= Kitching =

Kitching is a surname. Notable people with the surname include:

- Alan Kitching (typographic artist) (born 1940), British typographic artist
- Alan Kitching, British graphic designer
- Arthur Kitching (bishop) (1875–1960), Anglican missionary, bishop and author
- Arthur Kitching (politician) (1840–1919), English stockbroker and Liberal politician
- Audrey Kitching (born 1985), American model and fashion designer
- Belinda Kitching (born 1977), Australian footballer
- Christopher Kitching (born 1945), British archivist
- Colin Kitching (1933–2022), Australian soccer player
- Colin Kitching, violinist for English band Centipede
- Fat Kitching (fl. 1938), Australian soccer player
- Fran Kitching (born 1998), English footballer
- Frederick Kitching (1886–1918), British athlete
- Gavin Kitching, British professor of international relations
- George Kitching (1910–1999), Canadian World War II general
- Harold Kitching (1885–1980), British rower
- Harry Kitching (1905–?), English footballer
- J. Howard Kitching (1838–1865), American Civil War Union Army officer
- Jack Kitching (1921–?), British rugby league footballer
- James Kitching (1922–2003), South African vertebrate palaeontologist
- John Alwyne Kitching (1908–1996), British biologist
- John Kitching (athlete), British athlete
- Kimberley Kitching (1970–2022), Australian politician
- Liam Kitching (born 1999), English footballer
- Mark Kitching (born 1995), English professional footballer
- Nigel Kitching (born 1959), British comic book artist
- Phil Kitching (born 1967), English professional footballer
- Theodore Kitching (1866–1930), British officer of the Salvation Army
- Wilfred Kitching (1893–1977), 7th General of the Salvation Army
- William and Alfred Kitching, British locomotive builders

== See also ==
- Kitching Ridge, in Antarctica
- Kitchings, surname
