= Dan Gardner (footballer) =

English footballer (born 1990)

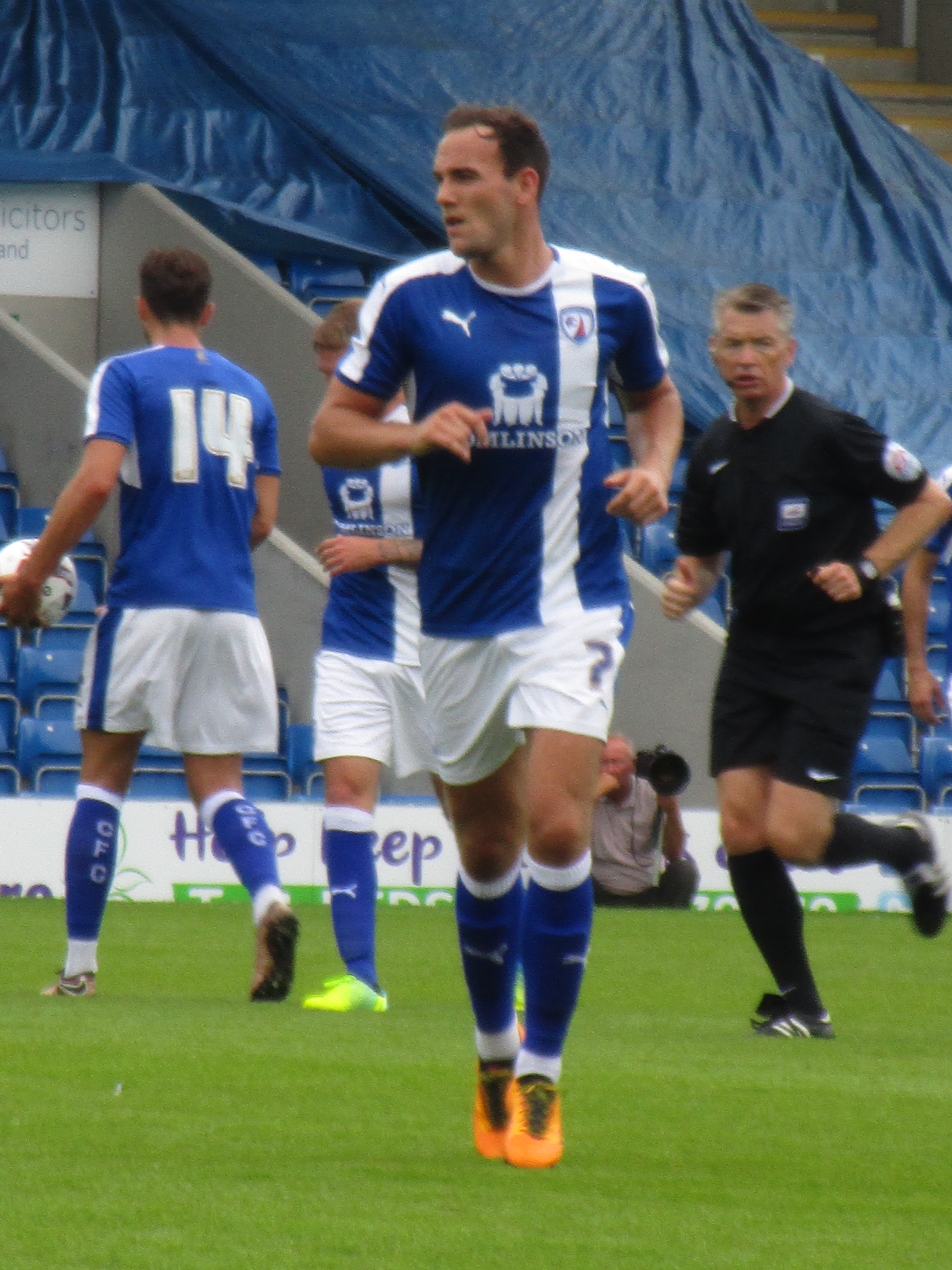
- Gardner playing for Chesterfield in 2016

Personal information
- Full name: Daniel Keith Gardner
- Date of birth: 5 April 1990 (age 36)
- Place of birth: Gorton, England
- Height: 6 ft 1 in (1.85 m)
- Position: Midfielder

Team information
- Current team: Hyde United

Senior career*
Years	Team	Apps	(Gls)
2008–2009	Celtic	0	(0)
2009–2010	Flixton		
2010	Crewe Alexandra	2	(0)
2010–2012	Droylsden	69	(19)
2012–2014	FC Halifax Town	51	(17)
2014–2017	Chesterfield	97	(10)
2015	→ Tranmere Rovers (loan)	4	(2)
2016	→ Bury (loan)	6	(0)
2017–2019	Oldham Athletic	63	(3)
2020–2021	Wigan Athletic	36	(1)
2021–2022	Doncaster Rovers	20	(3)
2022–2025	Oldham Athletic	62	(5)
2026	Hyde United		
- * Club domestic league appearances and goals as of 12 January 2025

Daniel Keith Gardner (born 5 April 1990) is an English professional footballer who plays as a midfielder for Hyde United. He has played in the Football League for Crewe Alexandra, Chesterfield, Oldham Athletic, Wigan Athletic and Doncaster Rovers.

== Career ==
=== Celtic ===
Gardner was attending The Manchester College, training to be a panel beater and playing for their academy team (affiliated with FC United of Manchester) when he was noticed by scouts from Scotland and invited for a trial with Celtic's youth team in mid-October 2008. An "outstanding" performance against Rangers secured a short-term deal which was extended to a three-year professional contract. He went on to make a couple of substitute appearances for the reserve team. However the SPL decided to scrap the Reserve League and so teams continued with a smaller first-team roster and a youth team. This effectively left him surplus to requirements and he was released by the club in May 2009.

=== Flixton ===
Gardner returned to Manchester where he was persuaded to join local team Flixton in the Vodkat Premier Division. His performances soon attracted the attention of football league sides, he spent two weeks on trial at Oldham Athletic and a month training with Crewe Alexandra.

=== Crewe Alexandra ===
While training with Crewe he hit the only goal in a reserve game against Aston Villa on 20 January 2010. This earned him a deal until the end of the season. He was handed the number 34 shirt and went on to make two substitute appearances in League Two before being released at the end of the 2009–10 season.

=== Non-League ===
Gardner joined Droylsden for the 2010–11 season in the Conference North. He signed for fellow Conference North team FC Halifax Town in July 2012. He made his league debut in November in a 4–0 home win against Vauxhall Motors. His first league goal for the club was a penalty in a 3–3 draw at home to Histon in February, a couple of days after scoring a brace in the FA Trophy at Dartford. He went on to score 8 more league goals for the club and was instrumental in the Conference North play-off final at Brackley Town which secured Town's place back in the Conference Premier for the 2013–14 season.

=== Chesterfield ===
It was announced on 4 January 2014 that Gardner had joined League Two side Chesterfield.

On 8 March 2016, he moved to Bury, signing a loan deal with the Shakers that was due to last until the end of the 2015–16 season, however Gardner was recalled early and scored against Bury in Chesterfield's final home game of the season.

=== Oldham Athletic ===
On 2 June 2017, after leaving Chesterfield, Gardner signed for Oldham Athletic on a two-year contract. He became John Sheridan's first summer signing as Oldham boss. After a knee injury in November 2018, he was released in 2019.

=== Wigan Athletic ===
At the beginning of September 2020 he joined Wigan Athletic on a short-term deal and on 5 October 2020, his contract was extended until January 2021. He scored his only goal for Wigan in a 4–3 win against Accrington Stanley on 12 December 2020. He made 40 appearances in total in the 2020–21 season.

=== Doncaster Rovers ===
On 6 August 2021, Gardner joined Doncaster Rovers on a one-year contract. He scored his first goal for the club in a 4–3 loss against Morecambe on 2 January 2022. Following relegation to League Two, Gardner was released at the end of his one-year contract.

=== Return to Oldham Athletic ===
On 29 July 2022, Gardner returned to Oldham Athletic on a two-year deal following their relegation to the National League. He made a total of 18 appearances during Oldham Athletics first campaign in the National league. His only goal of the campaign was the first goal in a 2–1 win against Aldershot at Boundary Park. During the following season, Gardner scored 4 goals in 26 appearances. It was announced on the 26th June that Gardner had signed a one-year extension with Oldham Athletic.

== Personal life ==
Gardner has an autistic son.

== Career statistics ==
As of end of 2021–22 season

Appearances and goals by club, season and competition
Club	Season	League			FA Cup		League Cup		Other		Total	
Club	Season	Division	Apps	Goals	Apps	Goals	Apps	Goals	Apps	Goals	Apps	Goals
Crewe Alexandra	2009–10	League Two	2	0	0	0	0	0	0	0	2	0
Droylsden	2010–11	Conference North	29	1	4	0	~	~	4 (Note: Appearances in the FA Trophy)	1	37	2
Droylsden	2011–12	Conference North	40	18	2	0	~	~	2	0	44	18
Droylsden	Total		69	19	6	0	~	~	6	1	81	20
FC Halifax Town	2012–13	Conference North	28	10	0	0	~	~	4	2	32	12
FC Halifax Town	2013–14	Football Conference	23	7	2	0	~	~	1	0	26	7
FC Halifax Town	Total		51	17	2	0	~	~	5	2	58	19
Chesterfield	2013–14	League Two	16	3	0	0	0	0	1 (Note: Appearance in Football League Trophy)	0	17	3
Chesterfield	2014–15	League One	17	1	3	0	0	0	2 (Note: Appearances in League One play-offs)	0	22	1
Chesterfield	2015–16	League One	30	4	2	0	1	0	0	0	33	4
Chesterfield	2016–17	League One	34	2	0	0	0	0	4 (Note: Appearances in EFL Trophy)	0	38	2
Chesterfield	Total		97	10	5	0	1	0	7	0	110	10
Tranmere Rovers (loan)	2014–15	League Two	4	2	0	0	0	0	0	0	4	2
Bury (loan)	2015–16	League One	6	0	0	0	0	0	0	0	6	0
Oldham Athletic	2017–18	League One	43	1	1	0	0	0	5	0	49	1
Oldham Athletic	2018–19	League Two	20	2	1	0	1	0	3	0	25	2
Oldham Athletic	Total		63	3	2	0	1	0	8	0	74	3
Wigan Athletic	2020–21	League One	36	1	1	0	1	0	2	0	40	1
Doncaster Rovers	2021–22	League One	20	3	0	0	2	0	2	0	24	3
Oldham Athletic	2022–23	National League	18	1	0	0	~	~	0	0	18	1
Oldham Athletic	2023–24	National League	25	4	1	0	~	~	0	0	26	4
Oldham Athletic	2024–25	National League	1	0	0	0	~	~	0	0	1	0
Total		43	5	1	0	~	~	0	0	44	5	
Career total			391	60	17	0	5	0	30	3	445	64

== Honours ==
Chesterfield

- Football League Two: 2013–14
