= Will Sutton (footballer) =

English footballer (born 2002)

Personal information
- Full name: William Joseph Sutton
- Date of birth: 30 October 2002 (age 24)
- Place of birth: Warrington, England
- Height: 6 ft 2 in (1.88 m)
- Position: Defender

Team information
- Current team: Oldham Athletic
- Number: 16

Youth career
- –2020: Oldham Athletic

Senior career*
Years	Team	Apps	(Gls)
2020–	Oldham Athletic	84	(4)
2021	→ Witton Albion (loan)	19	(1)
2021–2022	→ Farsley Celtic (loan)	10	(0)
2023	→ Radcliffe (loan)	0	(0)
2026	→ Solihull Moors (loan)	0	(0)
- * Club domestic league appearances and goals as of 23 January 2026

William Joseph Sutton is an English professional footballer who plays as a defender for Solihull Moors on loan from EFL League Two club Oldham Athletic.

== Career ==
Sutton made his first-team debut for Oldham Athletic on 10 November 2020, playing the full 90 minutes and scoring an own goal in a 3–1 victory at Bradford City. Manager Harry Kewell said that "he was excellent... he scored his first goal as well, just in the wrong net!"

In January 2023, Sutton joined Radcliffe on a one-month loan deal.

In January 2026, Sutton joined National League club Solihull Moors on loan for the remainder of the season.

== Statistics ==
As of 21 January 2026

Appearances and goals by club, season and competition
Club	Season	League			FA Cup		EFL Cup		Other		Total	
Club	Season	Division	Apps	Goals	Apps	Goals	Apps	Goals	Apps	Goals	Apps	Goals
Oldham Athletic	2020–21	League Two	1	0	0	0	0	0	1 (Note: Appearance(s) in EFL Trophy)	0	2	0
Oldham Athletic	2021–22	League Two	9	2	0	0	0	0	0	0	9	2
Oldham Athletic	2022–23	National League	20	1	0	0	—		0	0	20	1
Oldham Athletic	2023–24	National League	25	0	1	0	—		1 (Note: Appearance(s) in FA Trophy)	0	27	0
Oldham Athletic	2024–25	National League	15	0	1	1	—		6 (Note: One appearance in FA Trophy, four appearances in National League Cup, one appearance in National League play-offs)	0	22	1
Oldham Athletic	2025–26	League Two	10	1	2	0	1	0	3	0	16	1
Oldham Athletic	Total		80	4	4	1	1	0	11	0	96	5
Witton Albion (loan)	2021–22	Northern Premier League Premier Division	19	1	2	0	—		2 (Note: One appearance in Cheshire Senior Cup, one appearance in FA Trophy)	0	23	1
Career total			99	5	6	1	1	0	13	0	119	6
