= Benny Couto =

Portuguese association football player

Personal information
- Full name: Bernardo Peixoto Couto
- Date of birth: 27 September 2003 (age 23)
- Place of birth: Espinho, Portugal
- Position: Left-back

Team information
- Current team: Waterford
- Number: 3

Youth career
- Anta Baixinhos
- Oldham Athletic

Senior career*
Years	Team	Apps	(Gls)
2021–2024	Oldham Athletic	28	(1)
2023	→ The New Saints (loan)	1	(0)
2023–2024	→ Ashton United (loan)	31	(3)
2024	Ashton United	17	(1)
2025	Cork City	20	(0)
2026–	Waterford	33	(2)
- * Club domestic league appearances and goals as of 14:50, 4 November 2026(UTC)

Bernardo Peixoto Couto (born 27 September 2003) is a Portuguese professional footballer who plays as a left-back for League of Ireland Premier Division club Waterford.

== Club career ==
=== Early life and career ===
Couto was born in Espinho on the outskirts of Porto and began playing football with local club Anta Baixinhos, where he earned a trial period with FC Porto that did not result in him signing for the club. At the age of 10, his parents moved the family to Manchester, England for work and while playing for the local district team against Oldham Athletic, Couto's performance impressed Oldham coaches enough to sign him for the club's academy sides.

=== Oldham Athletic ===
In August 2021, Couto was called up to participate in first team training at Oldham Athletic by coach Keith Curle after impressing coaches with the youth squad. On 31 August, Couto was named as a starter for Oldham Athletic in the EFL Trophy match against Salford City, playing the whole 90 minutes in the 1–0 victory. Shortly following his debut, he would go onto play the second half in the 7-0 away defeat to Brentford in the EFL Cup. Despite the Scoreline, he played well leading to his first League Two start days later. A 1-0 victory against Rochdale in the Greater Manchester derby again performing well and winning favour with the Oldham Athletic fans. Throughout the festive period Couto continued to perform well. During this period he scored his first professional goal in a 3-1 defeat at home to Scunthorpe United.

==== The New Saints loan ====
In August 2023 he joined Cymru Premier club The New Saints on loan until January 2024. He only made one appearance during the loan spell however.

=== Ashton United ===
In August 2023, Couto joined Northern Premier League Premier Division side Ashton United initially on a short term loan deal, which was then extended in October before signing permanently with them in the summer of 2024.

=== Cork City ===
On 29 November 2024, Couto signed for newly promoted League of Ireland Premier Division side Cork City ahead of their 2025 season. On 26 April 2025, he picked up an ankle injury in a 1–1 draw away to Sligo Rovers that would keep him out of action for several months. He made a total of 23 appearances in all competitions by the end of the season, as the club were relegated to the League of Ireland First Division by finishing bottom of the league.

=== Waterford ===
On 5 December 2025, it was announced that Couto had signed for League of Ireland Premier Division club Waterford. Couto had a hugely successful first season with the club, scoring 2 goals and a league best 12 assists, from 33 league appearances. On 8 November 2026, he started in the 2026 FAI Cup final as his side were defeated 1–0 by Derry City at the Aviva Stadium. On 11 November 2026, he signed a new contract to remain at the club ahead of the 2027 season.

== Career statistics ==
As of match played 8 November 2026

Appearances and goals by club, season and competition
Club	Season	League			National Cup (Note: Includes FA Cup, Welsh Cup & FAI Cup)		League Cup (Note: Includes EFL Cup & Welsh League Cup)		Other		Total	
Club	Season	Division	Apps	Goals	Apps	Goals	Apps	Goals	Apps	Goals	Apps	Goals
Oldham Athletic	2021–22	League Two	19	1	2	0	1	0	5 (Note: Appearances in the EFL Trophy)	0	26	1
Oldham Athletic	2022–23	National League	9	0	2	0	–		2 (Note: Appearances in the FA Trophy)	0	13	0
Oldham Athletic	2023–24	National League	0	0	0	0	–		0	0	0	0
Oldham Athletic	Total		28	1	4	0	1	0	7	0	40	1
The New Saints (loan)	2023–24	Cymru Premier	1	0	0	0	0	0	0	0	1	0
Ashton United (loan)	2023–24	Northern Premier League Premier Division	31	3	2	0	–		5 (Note: 2 appearances in the FA Trophy & 3 appearances, 1 goal in the Manchester Premier Cup)	1	38	4
Ashton United	2024–25	Northern Premier League Premier Division	17	1	0	0	–		2	0	19	1
Cork City	2025	LOI Premier Division	20	0	2	0	–		1 (Note: Appearance(s) in the Munster Senior Cup)	0	23	0
Waterford	2026	LOI Premier Division	33	2	5	1	–		0	0	38	3
Career total			130	7	13	1	1	0	15	1	159	9
