= Phil Kitching =

English footballer

Personal information
- Full name: Phillip John Kitching
- Date of birth: 30 September 1967 (age 59)
- Place of birth: Lewisham, London, England
- Position: Midfielder

Youth career
- 1984–1987: Bradford City

Senior career*
Years	Team	Apps	(Gls)
1987	Bradford City	0	(0)
1987–1988	York City	13	(0)
1988–	Harrogate Town		
- York Railway Institute
- Selby Town
- Knaresborough Town
Total		13	(0)
- * Club domestic league appearances and goals

Phillip John Kitching (born 30 September 1967) is an English former professional footballer who played as a midfielder in the Football League for York City, in non-League football for Harrogate Town, York Railway Institute, Selby Town and Knaresborough Town, and was on the books of Bradford City without making a league appearance.
