= Sai Sachdev =

English footballer (born 2005)

Personal information
- Full name: Sai Sachin Rony Sachdev
- Date of birth: 9 March 2005 (age 21)
- Place of birth: Leicester, England
- Position: Right-back

Team information
- Current team: Boston United (on loan from Sheffield United)

Youth career
- –2017: Leicester City
- 2017–2021: Aylestone Park
- 2021–2022: Sheffield United

Senior career*
Years	Team	Apps	(Gls)
2022–	Sheffield United	2	(0)
2024	→ Oldham Athletic (loan)	4	(0)
2026–	→ Boston United (loan)	6	(1)

International career^{‡}
2022	England U17	2	(0)
2022–2023	England U18	5	(0)
2023	England U19	3	(0)
- * Club domestic league appearances and goals as of 5 September 2026 (UTC) ‡ National team caps and goals as of 14:58, 12 October 2023 (UTC)

Sai Sachin Rony Sachdev (born 9 March 2005) is an English professional footballer who plays as a right-back for National League club Boston United on loan from EFL Championship club Sheffield United.

== Club career ==
Sachdev was released by Leicester City at the age of 13 where he joined local Leicester side Aylestone Park up until he was 16. Sachdev then joined Sheffield United in 2021 following a successful trial. In October 2022, he was first called up to train with the senior squad of Sheffield United after the club faced an injury crisis. He made his professional and EFL Championship debut as a late substitute with Sheffield United in a 3–1 loss to Stoke City on 8 October 2022.

In January 2024, Sachdev joined National League club Oldham Athletic on loan until the end of the season.

In July 2026, Sachdev joined National League club Boston United on loan until January 2027.

== International career ==
Born in England, Sachdev is of Indian descent. He is a youth international for England, having been called up to the England U17s and U18s.

On 6 September 2023, Sachdev made his England U19 debut during a 1–0 defeat to Germany in Oliva.

== Career statistics ==
As of match played 27 August 2024

Appearances and goals by club, season and competition
Club	Season	League			FA Cup		EFL Cup		Other		Total	
Club	Season	Division	Apps	Goals	Apps	Goals	Apps	Goals	Apps	Goals	Apps	Goals
Sheffield United	2022–23	Championship	1	0	0	0	0	0	—		1	0
Sheffield United	2023–24	Premier League	0	0	0	0	0	0	—		0	0
Sheffield United	2024–25	Championship	1	0	0	0	1	0	—		2	0
Sheffield United	Total		2	0	0	0	1	0	0	0	3	0
Oldham Athletic (loan)	2023–24	National League	6	0	0	0	—		—		6	0
Career total			8	0	0	0	1	0	0	0	9	0
