= Devarn Green =

English footballer

Personal information
- Full name: Devarn Rohan Green
- Date of birth: 26 August 1996 (age 30)
- Height: 5 ft 11 in (1.81 m)
- Position: Forward

Youth career
- Burton Albion
- 2013–2016: Blackburn Rovers

Senior career*
Years	Team	Apps	(Gls)
2016–2017	Hednesford Town		
2017	Stourbridge		
2017–2018	Tranmere Rovers	3	(1)
2018	→ Warrington Town (loan)	13	(3)
2018–2020	Southport	57	(8)
2020–2022	Scunthorpe United	53	(3)
2022–2023	AFC Telford United	31	(4)
2023–2024	Oldham Athletic	41	(6)
2025	Warrington Town	1	(0)
- * Club domestic league appearances and goals as of 18:59, 27 February 2025 (UTC)

Devarn Rohan Green (born 26 August 1996) is an English professional footballer who plays as a forward. He last played for Northern Premier League Premier Division club Warrington Town.

A former trainee at Burton Albion and Blackburn Rovers, he played non-league football for Hednesford Town, Stourbridge, Tranmere Rovers and Southport, before he was signed by Scunthorpe United in January 2020.

== Career ==
=== Early career ===
Green spent time at Burton Albion, before joining Blackburn Rovers at the age of 16 on a two-year scholarship, following a two-week trial in July 2013. However he left Ewood Park in the summer of 2016. He spent time at Hednesford Town, before it was reported that he had "decided to move away from Keys Park in order to pursue opportunities elsewhere" on 21 September 2017. Later that month he joined Northern Premier League Premier Division rivals Stourbridge, who sold him on to Tranmere Rovers of the National League for an undisclosed fee on 28 October. Whilst at Tranmere he spent a loan spell at Warrington Town.

He signed a two-year contract with Southport on 27 June 2018.

=== Scunthorpe United ===
He signed for EFL League Two club Scunthorpe United on 31 January 2020; he signed an 18-month contract after being purchased for an undisclosed fee. He made his debut in the English Football League for the "Iron" on 29 February, coming on as a 42nd-minute substitute for Abo Eisa in a 2–2 draw at Port Vale.

He was released by the club on 31 January 2022.

=== AFC Telford United ===
On 8 March 2022, Green signed for National League North side AFC Telford United.

=== Oldham Athletic ===
On 17 February 2023, Green signed for National League club Oldham Athletic on a short-term deal until the end of the season following a successful trial period. He was offered a contract at the end of the season.

In April 2024, Oldham released their list of retained players, with Green listed as being out of contract.

=== Warrington Town ===
On 25 February 2025, Green returned to National League North side Warrington Town, having previously been loaned to the club. He was released at the end of the season.

== Career statistics ==
As of match played 20 April 2024.

Club	Season	League			FA Cup		EFL Cup		Other (Note: Appearances in FA Trophy)		Total	
Club	Season	Division	Apps	Goals	Apps	Goals	Apps	Goals	Apps	Goals	Apps	Goals
Tranmere Rovers	2017–18	National League	3	1	0	0	—		0	0	3	1
Southport	2018–19	National League	33	2	4	1	—		0	0	37	3
Southport	2019–20	National League	24	6	1	0	—		2	0	27	6
Southport	Total		57	8	5	1	0	0	2	0	64	9
Scunthorpe United	2019–20	League Two	2	0	0	0	0	0	0	0	2	0
Scunthorpe United	2020–21	League Two	36	3	1	0	1	0	2	0	40	3
Scunthorpe United	2021–22	League Two	15	0	1	0	1	0	1	0	18	0
Scunthorpe United	Total		53	3	2	0	2	0	3	0	60	3
AFC Telford United	2021–22	National League North	12	3	0	0	—		0	0	12	3
AFC Telford United	2022–23	National League North	19	1	1	0	—		1	0	21	1
AFC Telford United	Total		31	4	1	0	0	0	1	0	33	4
Oldham Athletic	2022–23	National League	15	3	0	0	—		0	0	15	3
Oldham Athletic	2023–24	National League	26	3	1	0	—		1	0	28	3
Oldham Athletic	Total		41	6	1	0	0	0	1	0	43	6
Career total			182	21	9	1	2	0	7	0	200	22
