= Magnus Norman (footballer) =

English footballer

Personal information
- Full name: Magnus Antony Norman
- Date of birth: 19 January 1997 (age 29)
- Place of birth: Kingston upon Thames, England
- Height: 6 ft 4 in (1.93 m)
- Position: Goalkeeper

Team information
- Current team: Sholing

Youth career
- 2006–2014: Fulham

Senior career*
Years	Team	Apps	(Gls)
2014–2020	Fulham	0	(0)
2015	→ Farnborough (loan)	6	(0)
2015–2016	→ Hayes & Yeading United (loan)	2	(0)
2016–2017	→ Southport (loan)	23	(0)
2018–2019	→ Rochdale (loan)	7	(0)
2020–2022	Carlisle United	14	(0)
2022–2025	Oldham Athletic	44	(0)
2024	→ Ebbsfleet United (loan)	0	(0)
2025	Dorking Wanderers	0	(0)
2025–	St Albans City	18	(0)
2026	→ Sholing (loan)	4	(0)
2026–	Sholing	2	(0)

International career
- England U18
- * Club domestic league appearances and goals as of 20:03, 21 February 2026 (UTC)

Magnus Antony Norman (born 19 January 1997) is an English professional footballer who plays as a goalkeeper for Southern League Premier Division South club Sholing.

== Club career ==
Born in Kingston upon Thames, Norman joined Fulham at the age of nine, turning professional in October 2014. He spent loan spells at Farnborough and Hayes & Yeading United. He joined Southport on loan in September 2016 for an initial one-month loan. In October 2016 he was described as a "key player" for the club, and in November 2016 the loan deal was extended until the end of the 2016–17 season. He returned to Fulham in March 2017, having made 29 appearances in all competitions for Southport. He moved on loan to Rochdale in August 2018, making his debut on 21 August 2018.

Norman joined Carlisle United on a free transfer on 7 August 2020, signing a two-year deal.

On 1 July 2022, Norman joined recently relegated National League club Oldham Athletic on a one-year deal following his release from Carlisle. On 7 December 2024, Norman joined fellow National League side Ebbsfleet United on loan for the remainder of the season.

On 2 January 2025, Norman had his contract with Oldham Athletic terminated by mutual consent, immediately joining National League South side Dorking Wanderers. On 14 May 2025, it was announced that Norman would leave the club at the end of his contract in June.

In July 2025, Norman joined St Albans City following their relegation to the Isthmian League Premier Division. He joined Sholing on a one-month loan in January 2026. He joined Sholing on a permanent basis in February 2026 on a deal until the end of the season.

== International career ==
He has represented England at under-18 youth level.

== Career statistics ==
As of 9 January 2026

Appearances and goals by club, season and competition
Club	Season	League			FA Cup		EFL Cup		Other		Total	
Club	Season	Division	Apps	Goals	Apps	Goals	Apps	Goals	Apps	Goals	Apps	Goals
Fulham	2014–15	Championship	0	0	0	0	0	0	—		0	0
Fulham	2015–16	Championship	0	0	0	0	0	0	—		0	0
Fulham	2016–17	Championship	0	0	0	0	0	0	0	0	0	0
Fulham	2017–18	Championship	0	0	0	0	0	0	—		0	0
Fulham	2018–19	Premier League	0	0	0	0	0	0	—		0	0
Fulham	2019–20	Championship	0	0	0	0	0	0	—		0	0
Fulham	Total		0	0	0	0	0	0	0	0	0	0
Farnborough (loan)	2014–15	Conference South	6	0	—		—		—		6	0
Hayes & Yeading United (loan)	2015–16	National League South	2	0	0	0	—		0	0	2	0
Southport (loan)	2016–17	National League	23	0	3	0	—		2 (Note: Appearances in the FA Trophy)	0	28	0
Fulham U21	2017–18	—			—		—		2 (Note: Appearances in the EFL Trophy)	0	2	0
Rochdale (loan)	2018–19	League One	7	0	0	0	1	0	4	0	12	0
Fulham U21	2019–20	—			—		—		2	0	2	0
Carlisle United	2020–21	League Two	4	0	0	0	0	0	2	0	6	0
Carlisle United	2021–22	League Two	10	0	0	0	0	0	0	0	10	0
Carlisle United	Total		14	0	0	0	0	0	2	0	16	0
Oldham Athletic	2022–23	National League	42	0	2	0	—		1	0	45	0
Oldham Athletic	2023–24	National League	2	0	0	0	—		1	0	3	0
Oldham Athletic	2024–25	National League	0	0	0	0	—		0	0	0	0
Oldham Athletic	Total		44	0	2	0	—		2	0	48	0
Ebbsfleet United (loan)	2024–25	National League	0	0	—		—		1	0	1	0
Dorking Wanderers	2024–25	National League South	0	0	—		—		0	0	0	0
St Albans City	2025–26	Isthmian League Premier Division	18	0	6	0	—		2	0	26	0
Career total			114	0	11	0	1	0	17	0	143	0
