= Kurt Willoughby =

English footballer (born 1997)

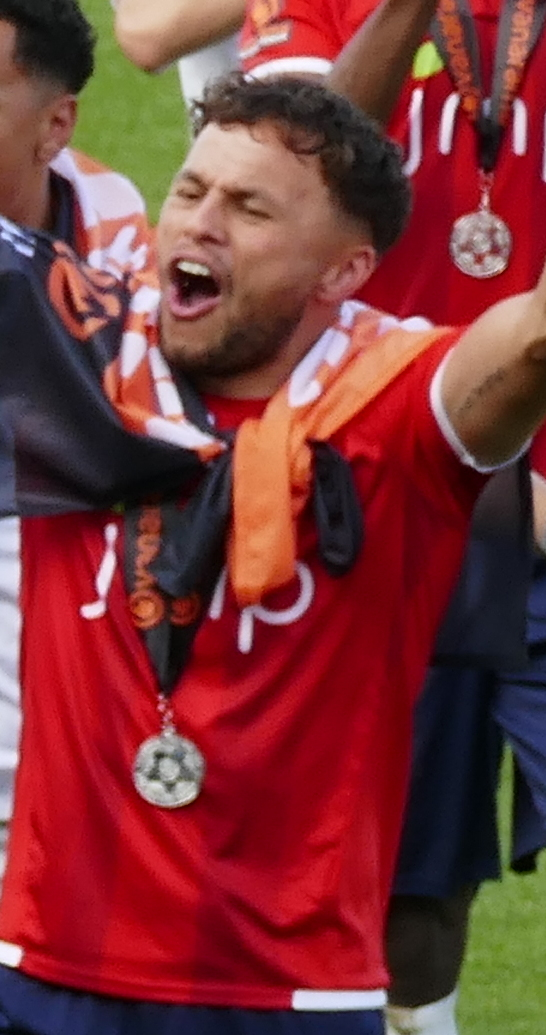

Personal information
- Full name: Kurt Henry Willoughby
- Date of birth: 15 July 1997 (age 29)
- Place of birth: Blackpool, England
- Height: 5 ft 10 in (1.78 m)
- Position: Forward

Team information
- Current team: Southport
- Number: 11

Youth career
- 2012–2014: Fleetwood Town

Senior career*
Years	Team	Apps	(Gls)
2014	Padiham	?	(0)
2014–2015	AFC Blackpool	?	(17)
2015–2018	Clitheroe	93	(42)
2018–2019	FC United of Manchester	39	(18)
2019–2021	AFC Fylde	29	(3)
2020	→ York City (loan)	4	(3)
2021–2022	York City	41	(7)
2022–2023	Chester	44	(20)
2023–2025	Oldham Athletic	15	(0)
2024	→ Ayr United (loan)	12	(3)
2024–2025	→ Chester (loan)	39	(6)
2025–2026	Kidderminster Harriers	18	(3)
2026	Buxton	5	(0)
2026	Ashton United	17	(3)
2026–	Southport	0	(0)

International career
2018–2019	England C	3	(1)
- * Club domestic league appearances and goals as of 10:59, 18 November 2026 (UTC)

Kurt Henry Willoughby (born 15 July 1997) is an English professional footballer who plays as a forward for National League North club Southport.

== Club career ==
=== Early career ===
Willoughby began his youth career in 2012 with Fleetwood Town. During the 2013–14 season, he joined Northern Premier League Division One North club Radcliffe Borough on a work experience loan.

After leaving Fleetwood, he had spells with Padiham, AFC Blackpool and Clitheroe, before stepping up two levels to sign for National League North club FC United of Manchester in May 2018.

=== AFC Fylde ===
On 3 June 2019, despite FC United's relegation, Willoughby stepped up another level to join National League club AFC Fylde. He joined National League North club York City on a one-month loan in January 2020. He was released by manager Jim Bentley in May 2021, at the end of his contract.

During his time with AFC Fylde, Willoughby attracted interest from multiple Football League clubs, including Bolton Wanderers, but a move never materialised.

=== York City ===
In June 2021, Willoughby rejoined York City permanently after being released by AFC Fylde. Despite earning promotion to the National League after winning the play-offs, he was released by York at the end of his contract in May.

=== Chester ===
On 13 June 2022, Willoughby signed a one-year deal with National League North club Chester.

=== Oldham Athletic ===
On 7 June 2023, Willoughby joined National League club Oldham Athletic, signing a two-year deal. On 1 February 2024, he joined Scottish Championship club Ayr United on loan until the end of the season. In July 2024, he rejoined former club Chester on a season-long loan.

=== Kidderminster Harriers ===
On 10 July 2025, Willoughby joined National League North side Kidderminster Harriers.

== International career ==
In October 2018, while at FC United, Willoughby was called up to the England C squad, and featured as a substitute in a 1–0 win against Estonia under-23.

In March 2019, he was called up once again and started against Wales C, scoring the second goal in a 2–2 draw.

His final appearance for England C came three months later in June 2019, where he played the full 90 minutes in a 2–0 defeat against Estonia under-23.

== Career statistics ==
As of end of 2024–25 season

Appearances and goals by club, season and competition
Club	Season	League			National cup (Note: Includes FA Cup, Scottish Cup)		League Cup		Other		Total	
Club	Season	Division	Apps	Goals	Apps	Goals	Apps	Goals	Apps	Goals	Apps	Goals
AFC Blackpool	2014–15	NWCFL Premier Division	?	9	?	0	?	0	?	0	?	9
AFC Blackpool	2015–16	NWCFL Premier Division	?	8	?	1	?	1	?	1	?	11
AFC Blackpool	Total		?	17	?	1	?	1	?	1	?	20
Clitheroe	2015–16	NPL Division One North	17	3	0	0	1	0	0	0	18	3
Clitheroe	2016–17	NPL Division One North	34	13	1	0	5	2	3 (Note: Appearance(s) in Lancashire FA Challenge Trophy)	5	43	20
Clitheroe	2017–18	NPL Division One North	42	26	1	1	1	0	6 (Note: Two appearances and one goal in FA Trophy, four appearances and three goals in Lancashire FA Challenge Trophy)	4	50	31
Clitheroe	Total		93	42	2	1	7	2	9	9	111	54
FC United of Manchester	2018–19	National League North	39	18	2	1	—		2 (Note: One appearance in FA Trophy, one appearance and one goal in Manchester Premier Cup)	1	43	20
AFC Fylde	2019–20	National League	19	2	1	0	—		2 (Note: Appearance(s) in FA Trophy)	0	22	2
AFC Fylde	2020–21	National League North	10	1	3	1	—		2	1	15	3
AFC Fylde	Total		29	3	4	1	—		4	1	37	5
York City (loan)	2019–20	National League North	4	3	—		—		0	0	4	3
York City	2021–22	National League North	41	7	4	3	—		8 (Note: Six appearances and one goal in FA Trophy, two appearances in National League North play-offs)	1	53	11
York City	Total		45	10	4	3	—		8	1	57	14
Chester	2022–23	National League North	44	20	5	5	—		3 (Note: Two appearances and two goals in FA Trophy, one appearance in National League North play-offs)	2	52	27
Oldham Athletic	2023–24	National League	15	0	0	0	—		2	1	17	1
Ayr United (loan)	2023–24	Scottish Championship	12	3	1	0	—		—		13	3
Chester (loan)	2024–25	National League North	39	6	4	0	—		4 (Note: One appearance in FA Trophy, three appearances in National League North play-offs)	0	47	6
Career total			316	102	22	11	7	2	32	15	377	130
