= Nathan Sheron =

English footballer (born 1997)

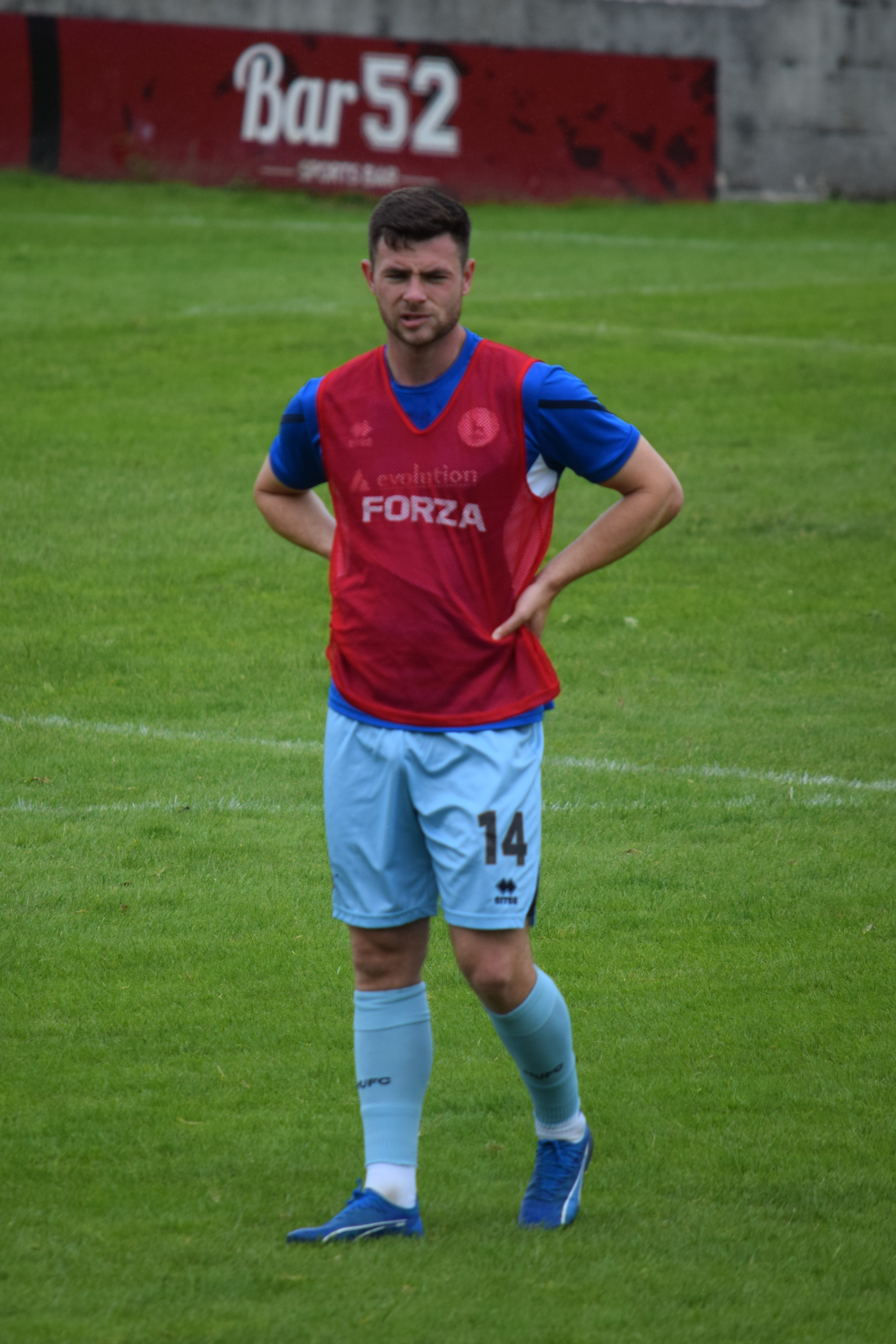
- Sheron warming up for Hartlepool United in 2024

Personal information
- Full name: Nathan Sheron
- Date of birth: 4 October 1997 (age 29)
- Place of birth: Whiston, England
- Height: 1.83 m (6 ft 0 in)
- Positions: Defender; midfielder

Team information
- Current team: Hartlepool United
- Number: 14

Youth career
- –2016: Liverpool

Senior career*
Years	Team	Apps	(Gls)
2016–2021	Fleetwood Town	27	(0)
2016–2017	→ Chorley (loan)	5	(0)
2017	→ Chester (loan)	3	(0)
2017–2018	→ Southport (loan)	5	(1)
2020	→ Walsall (loan)	7	(0)
2020	→ St Mirren (loan)	7	(0)
2021–2022	Harrogate Town	28	(0)
2022–2024	Oldham Athletic	89	(9)
2024–	Hartlepool United	105	(5)
- * Club domestic league appearances and goals as of 23:16, 21 November 2026 (UTC)

Nathan Sheron (born 4 October 1997) is an English professional footballer who plays as a defender and midfielder for National League side Hartlepool United.

== Career ==
Having previously played for Liverpool at youth level, Sheron began his career with Fleetwood Town, spending time on loan at Chorley, Chester and Southport.

He made his senior debut for Fleetwood on 8 November 2017, in an EFL Trophy match against Carlisle United. In doing so he became the first graduate of Fleetwood's Academy to play for the first-team. He was offered a new contract by Fleetwood at the end of the 2017–18 season. He made his full league debut on 2 October 2018 against Wycombe Wanderers, and was praised by manager Joey Barton.

He moved on loan to Walsall in January 2020.

On 7 July 2020, Sheron joined Scottish Premiership club St Mirren for the 2020–21 season.

At the end of the 2020–21 season, he was released by Fleetwood Town. He joined League Two side Harrogate Town on 16 July 2021. He spent just one season at Harrogate where he made 36 appearances in all competitions.

On 29 June 2022, Sheron agreed to join Oldham Athletic on a two-year contract, following the expiry of his Harrogate contract. Sheron was an ever present for The Latics and made 89 league appearances during his time at the club; he only missed one game in his first season with Oldham – due to the birth of his daughter.

On 21 June 2024, Sheron signed for fellow National League side Hartlepool United for an undisclosed fee. He made his Hartlepool debut in a 1–0 victory against Yeovil Town on the opening match of the 2024–25 season. On 23 October, he scored his first Hartlepool goal in the fifth minute of a 1–1 away draw with Altrincham. Due to injuries in the position, Sheron played in the unfamiliar right-back role at times during the season. He made 44 appearances in the National League in his debut season for Hartlepool. On 16 June 2025, Sheron signed a new two-year contract extension with the club. He was named as Hartlepool's vice captain ahead of the 2025–26 season.

== Personal life ==
Sheron is the nephew of former footballer Mike Sheron.

== Career statistics ==
As of 21 November 2026

Appearances and goals by club, season and competition
Club	Season	League			FA Cup		League Cup		Other		Total	
Club	Season	Division	Apps	Goals	Apps	Goals	Apps	Goals	Apps	Goals	Apps	Goals
Fleetwood Town	2016–17	League One	0	0	0	0	0	0	0	0	0	0
Fleetwood Town	2017–18	League One	0	0	0	0	0	0	3 (Note: Appearance(s) in EFL Trophy)	0	3	0
Fleetwood Town	2018–19	League One	26	0	2	0	2	0	3	0	33	0
Fleetwood Town	2019–20	League One	0	0	0	0	0	0	1	0	1	0
Fleetwood Town	2020–21	League One	1	0	0	0	0	0	0	0	1	0
Fleetwood Town	Total		27	0	2	0	2	0	7	0	38	0
Chorley (loan)	2016–17	National League North	5	0	0	0	—		1 (Note: Appearance in FA Trophy)	0	6	0
Chester (loan)	2017–18	National League	3	0	0	0	—		0	0	3	0
Southport (loan)	2017–18	National League North	5	1	0	0	—		0	0	5	1
Walsall (loan)	2019–20	League Two	7	0	0	0	0	0	0	0	7	0
St Mirren (loan)	2020–21	Scottish Premiership	7	0	0	0	2	0	0	0	9	0
Harrogate Town	2021–22	League Two	28	0	3	0	0	0	5	0	36	0
Oldham Athletic	2022–23	National League	45	3	3	0	0	0	2	0	50	3
Oldham Athletic	2023–24	National League	44	6	2	0	0	0	1	0	47	6
Oldham Athletic	Total		89	9	5	0	0	0	3	0	97	9
Hartlepool United	2024–25	National League	44	1	2	0	0	0	1	0	47	1
Hartlepool United	2025–26	National League	44	2	2	0	0	0	1	0	47	2
Hartlepool United	2026–27	National League	17	2	1	0	0	0	1	0	19	2
Hartlepool United	Total		105	5	5	0	0	0	3	0	113	5
Career total			275	15	15	0	4	0	19	0	313	15
