= Liam Hogan =

English footballer (born 1989)

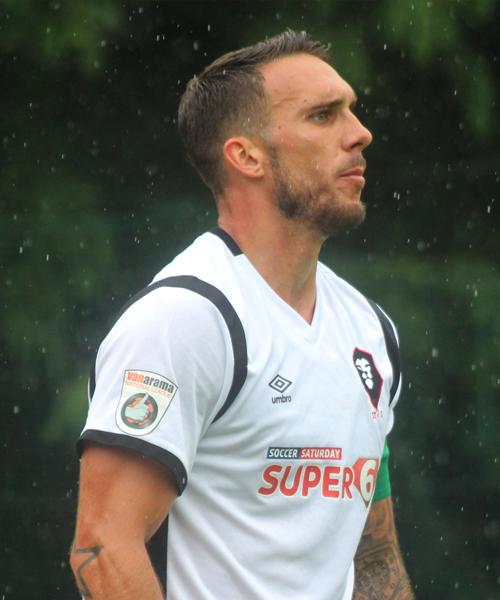
- Hogan playing for Salford City in 2017

Personal information
- Full name: Liam Anthony Hogan
- Date of birth: 8 February 1989 (age 37)
- Place of birth: Salford, England
- Height: 6 ft 0 in (1.83 m)
- Position: Centre-back

Team information
- Current team: Morecambe
- Number: 4

Youth career
- 2007–2010: Woodley Sports

Senior career*
| Years | Team | Apps | (Gls) |
| 2010–2013 | FC Halifax Town | 109 | (3) |
| 2013–2015 | Fleetwood Town | 20 | (0) |
| 2014–2015 | → Macclesfield Town (loan) | 9 | (0) |
| 2015–2016 | Tranmere Rovers | 18 | (2) |
| 2016–2017 | Gateshead | 44 | (0) |
| 2017–2020 | Salford City | 89 | (5) |
| 2020–2022 | Stockport County | 78 | (6) |
| 2022–2024 | Oldham Athletic | 76 | (2) |
| 2024–2026 | Rochdale | 34 | (0) |
| 2026– | Morecambe | 13 | (0) |
- * Club domestic league appearances and goals as of 12:49, 25 February 2026 (UTC)

Liam Anthony Hogan (born 8 February 1989) is an English professional footballer who plays as a centre-back for National League North club Morecambe.

== Career ==
=== Woodley Sports ===
Hogan started his career at Greater Manchester club Woodley Sports (afterwards known as Stockport Sports) in 2007, remaining in the club's youth setup for three years.

=== FC Halifax Town ===
On 1 July 2010, Hogan left Woodley and signed with FC Halifax Town. In his time at the Shaymen he played 109 league games, scoring three times. His first goal came against Nantwich Town with his second coming a week and a half later at Retford United, a game that saw the Shaymen crowned champions of the Northern Premier League Premier Division. His third goal came against Eastwood Town on 18 February 2012.

=== Fleetwood Town ===
On 22 May 2013, Hogan announced he was joining Lancashire club Fleetwood Town on a free transfer after his contract with F.C. Halifax ran out. He made his professional debut on 3 August, in a 3–1 home win against Dagenham & Redbridge.

==== Macclesfield Town (loan) ====
On 3 November 2014, Hogan was loaned to Conference Premier side Macclesfield Town until 9 December. On 11 December, his loan was extended until 10 January.

=== Tranmere Rovers ===
In May 2015 he joined Tranmere Rovers after his release by Fleetwood.

=== Gateshead ===
On 17 May 2016, Hogan signed for National League club Gateshead on a free transfer. On 30 July 2016, Hogan scored his first goal for the club in a 3–2 preseason victory at home to Boston United which won Gateshead the game. Hogan became club captain ahead of the 2016–17 season, making his competitive debut on 6 August 2016, as Gateshead beat Chester 3–0 in the first game of the season.

=== Salford City ===
In May 2017 he joined Salford City. At the end of the 2017–18 season he was named Player's Player of the Year by his fellow Salford players. During his time with the club he captained them to two promotions, the second of them securing the club's first promotion to the Football League, played 105 games and scored seven goals.

=== Stockport County ===
In February 2020 he moved to Stockport County, signing a two-and-a-half-year contract. He scored his first goal for the club on his debut.

=== Oldham Athletic ===
Hogan signed for newly relegated National League club Oldham Athletic on 1 June 2022 on a two-year contract.

On 27 September 2024, he departed the club having had his contract terminated by mutual consent.

=== Rochdale ===
On 27 September 2024, he joined Rochdale on a contract until the end of the 2024-2025 season, just hours after leaving their local rivals Oldham Athletic.

=== Morecambe ===
On 24 February 2026, Hogan joined National League club Morecambe on an eighteen-month deal.

== Personal life ==
Hogan was born in Salford, England, and is of Irish descent – he and his brother have two Irish grandparents. His younger brother is Irish international footballer Scott and they played together at Salford City College.

== Career statistics ==
As of 27 September 2024

Appearances and goals by club, season and competition
| Club | Season | League | | | FA Cup | | League Cup | | Other | | Total | |
| Club | Season | Division | Apps | Goals | Apps | Goals | Apps | Goals | Apps | Goals | Apps | Goals |
|---|---|---|---|---|---|---|---|---|---|---|---|---|
| FC Halifax Town | 2010–11 | NPL Premier Division | 41 | 2 | 4 | 0 | — | | 1 (Note: Appearance in FA Trophy) | 0 | 46 | 2 |
| FC Halifax Town | 2011–12 | Conference North | 40 | 1 | 4 | 0 | — | | 4 (Note: Two appearances in FA Trophy, two in Conference North play-offs) | 0 | 48 | 1 |
| FC Halifax Town | 2012–13 | Conference North | 28 | 0 | 4 | 0 | — | | 9 (Note: Six appearances in FA Trophy, three in Conference North play-offs) | 0 | 41 | 0 |
| FC Halifax Town | Total | | 109 | 3 | 12 | 0 | — | | 14 | 0 | 135 | 3 |
| Fleetwood Town | 2013–14 | League Two | 16 | 0 | 0 | 0 | 1 | 0 | 1 (Note: Appearance in Football League Trophy) | 0 | 18 | 0 |
| Fleetwood Town | 2014–15 | League One | 4 | 0 | 0 | 0 | 1 | 0 | 1 | 0 | 6 | 0 |
| Fleetwood Town | Total | | 20 | 0 | 0 | 0 | 2 | 0 | 2 | 0 | 24 | !0 |
| Macclesfield Town (loan) | 2014–15 | Conference Premier | 9 | 0 | — | | — | | 1 | 0 | 10 | 0 |
| Tranmere Rovers | 2015–16 | National League | 18 | 2 | 0 | 0 | — | | 0 | 0 | 18 | 2 |
| Gateshead | 2016–17 | National League | 44 | 0 | 2 | 0 | — | | 1 | 0 | 47 | 0 |
| Salford City | 2017–18 | National League North | 34 | 3 | 1 | 1 | — | | 1 | 0 | 36 | 4 |
| Salford City | 2018–19 | National League | 43 | 2 | 3 | 0 | — | | 7 (Note: Three appearances in FA Trophy, two appearances in Manchester Senior Cup, two appearances in National League play-offs) | 0 | 53 | 2 |
| Salford City | 2019–20 | League Two | 12 | 0 | 1 | 0 | 0 | 0 | 3 (Note: Appearances in EFL Trophy) | 1 | 16 | 1 |
| Salford City | Total | | 89 | 5 | 5 | 1 | 0 | 0 | 11 | 1 | 105 | 7 |
| Stockport County | 2019–20 | National League | 5 | 1 | — | | — | | — | | 5 | 1 |
| Stockport County | 2020–21 | National League | 40 | 1 | 4 | 0 | — | | 1 (Note: One appearance in National League play-offs) | 0 | 45 | 1 |
| Stockport County | 2021–22 | National League | 33 | 4 | 2 | 0 | — | | 4 (Note: Three appearances in FA Trophy, one appearance in Cheshire Senior Cup) | 0 | 39 | 4 |
| Stockport County | Total | | 78 | 6 | 6 | 0 | — | | 5 | 0 | 89 | 6 |
| Oldham Athletic | 2022–23 | National League | 34 | 1 | 0 | 0 | — | | 2 | 0 | 36 | 1 |
| Oldham Athletic | 2023–24 | National League | 42 | 1 | 2 | 0 | — | | 2 | 0 | 46 | 1 |
| Oldham Athletic | 2024–25 | National League | 0 | 0 | 0 | 0 | — | | 0 | 0 | 0 | 0 |
| Oldham Athletic | Total | | 76 | 2 | 2 | 0 | 0 | 0 | 4 | 0 | 82 | 2 |
| Career total | | | 443 | 18 | 27 | 1 | 2 | 0 | 38 | 1 | 510 | 20 |

== Honours ==
FC Halifax Town

- Northern Premier League Premier Division: 2010–11
- National League North play-offs: 2013

Salford City

- National League North: 2017-2018
- National League play-offs: 2019

Stockport County

- National League: 2021–22

Individual

- Salford City Player's Player of the Year: 2017–18
- National League Team of the Year: 2020–21
