= 2024–25 Oldham Athletic A.F.C. season =

Oldham Athletic current football season

Oldham Athletic
2024–25 season
- Chairman: Frank Rothwell
- Head Coach: Micky Mellon
- Stadium: Boundary Park
- National League: 5th (promoted via the play-offs)
- FA Cup: Second round
- FA Trophy: Third round
- National League Cup: First round
- Top goalscorer: League: Mike Fondop (17); All: Mike Fondop (19)
- Highest home attendance: 8,611
- Lowest home attendance: 4,769
- Average home league attendance: 6,008

The 2024–25 season is the 130th in Oldham Athletic's history, and the club's third season since dropping out of the Football League. The club is competing in the National League, the FA Cup and the FA Trophy. On 25 October 2024 the Premier League and National League announced a new competition, the National League Cup, with Oldham Athletic as one of the 32 teams competing in it.

== Pre-season ==
Within four days of the 2023–24 season concluding, Oldham announced that nineteen of the players contracted for the previous season remained in contract but that fourteen players were out of contract and three players who had ended the 2023–24 season on loan would return to their parent clubs.

The first pre-season changes took place off the pitch, with Academy Manager and First Team Coach Paul Murray leaving the club by mutual consent, Peter Norbury deciding to step down as a Director and Goalkeeping Coach Steve Collis leaving to join Notts County.

On the pitch, Micky Mellon had ended the previous season by claiming that his squad needed "major surgery". He began to reshape his squad by announcing the signing of defender Reagan Ogle and allowing Mark Shelton, Nathan Sheron and Joe Nuttall to leave the club, the latter on a season long loan to Altrincham.

== Players ==
=== First Team Squad ===
No	Pos	Nat	Name	Age	Debut	App	Start	Sub	Goal	Booked	Sent off (straight red)	Notes
1	GK	(England)	Mathew Hudson	28	18 Mar 2023	90	90	0	0	5	0	
2	DF	(Australia)	Reagan Ogle	27	10 Aug 2024	40	38	2	1	7	0	
3	DF	(England)	Mark Kitching	30	6 Nov 2022	125	119	6	6	19	0	
4	MF	(England)	Tom Pett	34	21 Jan 2025	22	20	2	0	4	0	On loan
5	DF	(England)	Shaun Hobson	28	5 Aug 2023	61	56	5	0	6	0	
6	DF	(Cameroon)	Manny Monthe	31	10 Aug 2024	30	30	0	5	5	0	
7	MF	(England)	Harry Charsley	30	10 Aug 2024	14	10	4	3	0	1	
8	MF	(England)	Josh Lundstram	27	30 Sep 2023	70	56	14	6	5	0	
9	FW	(Cameroon)	Mike Fondop	32	5 Feb 2022	124	74	50	45	17	4	
10	MF	(England)	Tom Conlon	30	13 Jan 2024	52	47	5	0	9	0	Captain
11	MF	(England)	Josh Kay	29	17 Aug 2024	26	8	18	1	3	1	
13	GK	(Wales)	Jake Dennis	21	29 Jan 2025	2	2	0	0	0	0	On loan
14	FW	(England)	Joe Garner	38	3 Feb 2024	34	21	13	8	8	0	
15	MF	(England)	Jordan Rossiter	29	18 Jan 2025	22	18	4	0	4	0	On loan
16	DF	(England)	Charlie Raglan	33	5 Aug 2023	81	79	2	5	11	0	Vice Captain
17	FW	(Nigeria)	Jes Uchegbulam	25	10 Aug 2024	34	15	19	3	3	0	
18	FW	(England)	Billy Waters	31	18 Jan 2025	13	9	4	2	1	0	
19	MF	(England)	Dan Gardner	36	19 Aug 2017	148	121	27	8	33	1	
20	DF	(England)	Jake Caprice	33	10 Aug 2024	45	36	9	2	8	0	
21	DF	(England)	Will Sutton	23	10 Nov 2020	80	76	4	4	11	1	
22	MF	(England)	Matt Worthington	28	25 Jan 2025	10	6	4	0	2	0	
23	MF	(England)	Kofi Moore	21	23 Dec 2023	5	2	3	1	0	0	
24	MF	(Northern Ireland)	Corry Evans	36	18 Jan 2025	7	3	4	0	0	0	
26	FW	(England)	Kian Harratt	24	11 Mar 2025	9	6	3	2	0	0	
27	MF	(Wales)	Oli Hammond	23	23 Jan 2024	25	19	6	0	0	0	
28	MF	(Wales)	Vimal Yoganathan	20	1 Feb 2025	15	7	8	1	3	0	On loan
29	MF	(England)	Joe Pritchard	29	4 Feb 2025	15	7	8	3	4	0	
30	FW	(England)	James Norwood	35	5 Aug 2023	73	53	20	28	16	0	
31	GK	(England)	Tom Donaghy	23	5 Feb 2025	10	10	0	0	0	0	
32	FW	(England)	Sam Taylor	22	1 Jan 2025	2	1	1	0	0	0	On loan
33	MF	(Pakistan)	Otis Khan	30	7 Sep 2024	14	7	7	1	0	1	
34	DF	(England)	Jake Leake	23	21 Jan 2025	16	15	1	0	1	0	On loan
35	GK	(England)	Scott Moloney	26	1 Oct 2024	4	4	0	0	1	0	
36	DF	(England)	AJ Amadin		10 Dec 2024	1	0	1	0	0	0	
39	DF	(England)	Ruben Ndienguila	20	10 Dec 2024	1	0	1	0	0	0	
40	MF	(England)	Dylan Teixeira	17	10 Dec 2024	2	2	0	1	0	0	
42	FW	(England)	Abubakar Muhammed	17	6 Nov 2024	4	0	4	0	0	0	
43	DF	(England)	Victor Dielunvuidi	17	6 Nov 2024	3	1	2	0	0	0	
44	FW	(England)	Theo Andrew		10 Dec 2024	1	0	1	0	0	0	

=== Out on loan ===
No	Pos	Nat	Name	Age	Debut	App	Start	Sub	Goal	Booked	Sent off (straight red)	Notes
TBC	FW	(England)	Joe Nuttall	29	26 Dec 2022	37	35	2	8	8	0	
TBC	FW	(England)	Kurt Willoughby	29	12 Aug 2023	17	5	12	1	0	0	
13	GK	(England)	Magnus Norman	29	6 Aug 2022	48	48	0	0	2	0	
25	FW	(England)	Alex Reid	30	3 Dec 2022	40	21	19	10	3	0	

=== Left the club during the season ===
No	Pos	Nat	Name	Age	Debut	Apps	Starts	Subs	Goal	Booked	Sent off (straight red)	Notes
4	DF	(England)	Liam Hogan	37	6 Aug 2022	82	79	3	2	20	1	Released 27 Sep
4	MF	(England)	Sam Clucas	35	2 Nov 2024	9	8	1	0	5	0	Transferred 17 Jan
15	FW	(England)	Jack Stretton	24	1 Oct 2024	2	1	1	0	0	0	On loan
18	MF	(England)	Callum Dolan	25	26 Aug 2024	7	3	4	0	1	0	On loan
22	DF	(England)	Mo Doro	21	1 Oct 2024	2	1	1	0	1	0	
24	MF	(Jamaica)	Jordon Garrick	28	1 Oct 2024	1	1	0	0	0	0	
24	FW	(England)	Josh Stones	22	16 Nov 2023	12	11	1	8	3	0	On loan
26	MF	(England)	Kai Payne	21	19 Oct 2024	5	5	0	0	0	0	On loan
31	FW	(England)	Kane Drummond	25	5 Oct 2024	10	6	4	0	0	0	On loan

== Pre-season and friendlies ==
On 16 May 2024, Oldham announced a schedule for seven pre-season friendlies to be played before the start of the National League season.

13 July 2024 Friendly	Oldham Athletic	1–0	Stockport County	Oldham
15:00 BST	Kitching 1'	Report		Stadium: Boundary Park; Attendance: 2,187; Referee: Ben Wyatt

16 July 2024 Friendly	Warrington Rylands	2–1	Oldham Athletic	Warrington
19:45 BST	Massanka 25'; Trialist 80'	Report	Gardner 15'	Stadium: Gorsey Lane

20 July 2024 Friendly	Oldham Athletic	0–0	Lincoln City	Oldham
15:00 BST		Report		Stadium: Boundary Park; Attendance: 1,138; Referee: Declan Brown

23 July 2024 Friendly	Southport	2–0	Oldham Athletic	Southport
19:30 BST	Owolabi 42'; Minihan 69'	Report	Reid (penalty missed) 4'	Stadium: Haig Avenue; Attendance: 928; Referee: Matt McQuillam

27 July 2024 Friendly	Radcliffe	1–0	Oldham Athletic	Radcliffe
15:00 BST	Fondop 36' (o.g.)	Report		Stadium: Neuven Stadium; Attendance: 1,142; Referee: Declan Brown

30 July 2024 Friendly	Warrington Town	3–3	Oldham Athletic	Warrington
19:45 BST	Miles 66', 68', 74'	Report	Clarke 40' (o.g.); Fondop 44', 60'	Stadium: Cantilever Park; Attendance: 803

3 August 2024 Friendly	Oldham Athletic	1–0	Shrewsbury Town	Oldham
15:00 BST	Fondop 23'	Report		Stadium: Boundary Park; Attendance: 1,247; Referee: Will Davis

== Competitions ==
Oldham Athletic will play in the National League in the 2024–25 season as well as in three cup competitions, joining the FA Cup at the Fourth Qualifying Round, the FA Trophy at the Third Round and the National League Cup at the First Round.

=== National League ===
==== League table ====
Pos	Team	Pld	W	D	L	GF	GA	GD	Pts	Promotion, qualification or relegation
3	Forest Green Rovers	46	22	17	7	69	42	+27	83	Qualification for National League play-off semi-finals
4	Rochdale	46	21	11	14	69	44	+25	74	Qualification for the National League play-off quarter-finals
5	Oldham Athletic (O, P)	46	19	16	11	64	48	+16	73	Qualification for the National League play-off quarter-finals
6	FC Halifax Town	46	19	13	14	50	46	+4	70	Qualification for the National League play-off quarter-finals
7	Southend United	46	17	17	12	59	48	+11	68	Qualification for the National League play-off quarter-finals

Source: National League official site
Rules for classification: 1) Points; 2) Goal difference; 3) Number of goals scored; 4) Number of matches won; 5) Head-to-head results
(O) Play-off winners; (P) Promoted

==== Results summary ====
Overall								Home						Away					
Pld	W	D	L	GF	GA	GD	Pts	W	D	L	GF	GA	GD	W	D	L	GF	GA	GD
46	19	16	11	64	48	+16	73	11	6	6	35	23	+12	8	10	5	29	25	+4

Last updated: 21 April 2025.

==== Results by matchday ====
Matchday	1	2	3	4	5	6	7	8	9	10	11	12	13	14	15	16	17	18	19	20	21	22	23	24	25	26	27	28	29	30	31	32	33	34	35	36	37	38	39	40	41	42	43	44	45	46
Ground	H	A	H	A	H	A	H	A	A	H	H	A	H	A	A	H	A	H	H	H	A	A	A	H	H	A	A	A	A	H	H	H	A	H	A	A	H	H	H	A	H	A	H	A	A	H
Result	W	W	D	L	D	D	D	D	W	W	W	W	L	W	D	W	D	W	W	W	W	L	D	L	L	D	W	W	W	D	D	L	D	L	D	D	W	D	W	L	L	L	W	D	L	W
Position	2	3	4	8	8	9	9	11	7	6	6	6	6	5	6	5	5	4	4	5	5	5	5	5	5	5	5	4	4	4	4	4	5	5	5	5	4	4	4	4	4	4	4	4	5	5
Points	3	6	7	7	8	9	10	11	14	17	20	23	23	26	27	30	31	34	37	40	43	43	44	44	44	45	48	51	54	55	56	56	57	57	58	59	62	63	66	66	66	66	69	70	70	73

Updated to match(es) played on 21 April 2025. Source: bbc.co.uk
A = Away; H = Home; W = Win; D = Draw; L = Loss

==== Matches - Regular Season ====
Oldham's fixtures were announced on 10 July 2024.

10 August 2024 1	Oldham Athletic	3–0	Braintree Town	Oldham
15:00 BST	Uchegbulam 11'; Charsley 29'; Fondop 59'	Report	Blackwell (yellow card) 34'; Akinde (yellow card) 35'; Effiong (penalty missed) 45'	Stadium: Boundary Park; Attendance: 5,552; Referee: Paul Cooper

17 August 2024 2	Wealdstone	0–1	Oldham Athletic	Ruislip
15:00 BST	Cesay (yellow card) 24'; Woodman (yellow card) 90+3'; Scott (red card) 90+4'	Report	Conlon (yellow card) 14'; Raglan (yellow card) 64'; Charsley 85'	Stadium: Grosvenor Vale; Attendance: 1,825; Referee: Ben Wyatt

20 August 2024 3	Oldham Athletic	1–1	AFC Fylde	Oldham
19:45 BST	Monthé 60'; Raglan (yellow card) 64'; Kay (yellow card) 70'; Gardner (yellow card) 90+6'	Report	Riley 36'; Davis (yellow card) 68'	Stadium: Boundary Park; Attendance: 5,682; Referee: William Davis

24 August 2024 4	Aldershot Town	4–1	Oldham Athletic	Aldershot
15:00 BST	Henry 38', 58'; Maghoma (yellow card) 67'; Frost 68'; Widdrington 90+4' (pen.)	Report	Conlon (yellow card) 48'; Ogle 60', (yellow card) 86'	Stadium: Recreation Ground; Attendance: 2,407; Referee: Matthew Russell

26 August 2024 5	Oldham Athletic	1–1	Gateshead	Oldham
15:00 BST	Lundstram (yellow card) 45+2'; Monthe 55'	Report	Newton 10'; Adom (yellow card) 54'; Storey (yellow card) 88'; Booty (yellow card) 90'	Stadium: Boundary Park; Attendance: 5,583; Referee: Gareth Rhodes

31 August 2024 6	Altrincham	1–1	Oldham Athletic	Altrincham
15:00 BST	Osborne (yellow card) 26'; Crawford (yellow card) 53'; Linney (yellow card) 56', (goal) 68'; Wilson (yellow card) 77'	Report	Norwood 23'; Uchegbulam (yellow card) 39'; Gardner (yellow card) 56'; Monthé (yellow card) 71'; Conlon (yellow card) 80'; Ogle (yellow card) 90+1'	Stadium: Moss Lane; Attendance: 3,561; Referee: Ollie Yates

7 September 2024 7	Oldham Athletic	1–1	Southend United	Oldham
15:00 BST	Fondop 76'	Report	Scott-Morriss 35'; Gubbins (yellow card) 37'; Ralph (yellow card) 88'	Stadium: Boundary Park; Attendance: 5,622; Referee: James Linington

10 September 2024 8	FC Halifax Town	1–1	Oldham Athletic	Halifax
19:45 BST	Senior 62'; Hoti (yellow card) 86'; Bray (yellow card) 90+4'	Report	Dolan (yellow card) 35'; Kitching 47'; Fondop (yellow card) 75'; Khan (yellow card) 80' (yellow-red card) 81'	Stadium: The Shay; Attendance: 3,146; Referee: Aaron Bannister

14 September 2024 9	Woking	1–3	Oldham Athletic	Woking
15:00 BST	Kendall 76'; Andrews (yellow card) 90+5'	Report	Lundstram 12'; Norwood 50'; Fondop 77'; Hudson (yellow card) 82'	Stadium: Kingfield Stadium; Attendance: 2,373; Referee: Robert Massey-Ellis

21 September 2024 10	Oldham Athletic	1–0	Yeovil Town	Oldham
15:00 BST	Raglan (yellow card) 33'; Fondop 81'; Kitching (yellow card) 90+4'; Hudson (yellow card) 90+8'	Report	Nouble (yellow card) 28'; Bernard (yellow card) 90+8'	Stadium: Boundary Park; Attendance: 5,411; Referee: Paul Marsden

24 September 2024 11	Oldham Athletic	1–0	Forest Green Rovers	Oldham
19:45 BST	Fondop 9'; Raglan (yellow card) 45+1'; Monthé (yellow card) 68'	Report	Moore-Taylor (yellow card) 76'; Robson (yellow card) 78'	Stadium: Boundary Park; Attendance: 5,034; Referee: Jamie O'Connor

28 September 2024 12	Ebbsfleet United	1–2	Oldham Athletic	Northfleet
17:30 BST	Poleon 81' (pen.)	Report	Kitching 47'; Khan 85'; Hudson (yellow card) 90+2'; Uchegbulam (yellow card) 90+4'	Stadium: Stonebridge Road; Attendance: 1,589; Referee: Aaron Farmer

5 October 2024 13	Oldham Athletic	2–3	Solihull Moors	Oldham
15:00 BST	Caprice (yellow card) 35'; Raglan (yellow card) 70'; Ogle (yellow card) 75'; Kitching 78'; Lundstram 90+6'	Report	Tunnicliffe (yellow card) 23'; Stevens 51'; Wilkinson (yellow card) 55'; Gale 81'; Oakley 90+4'	Stadium: Boundary Park; Attendance: 7,030; Referee: Darren Drysdale

19 October 2024 14	Sutton United	1–3	Oldham Athletic	Sutton
15:00 BST	Davies 48'; Okoli (yellow card) 51'; Nadesan (yellow card) 57'	Report	Fondop 20'; Sutton (yellow card) 47'; Raglan 52'; Norwood 90+1', (yellow card) 90+8'	Stadium: Gander Green Lane; Attendance: 3,329; Referee: Andrew Humphries

22 October 2024 15	Maidenhead United	2–2	Oldham Athletic	Maidenhead
19:45 BST	Golding 14'; Monthé 37' (o.g.); Ross (yellow card) 72'	Report	Fondop (yellow card) 30'; Monthé 44', (yellow card) 74'; Norwood (yellow card) 60'; Raglan 80'	Stadium: York Road; Attendance: 1,223; Referee: Richard Eley

26 October 2024 16	Oldham Athletic	1–0	Dagenham & Redbridge	Oldham
15:00 BST	Fondop 20', (yellow card) 90+3'; Uchegbulam (yellow card) 90+2'; Kay (yellow card) 89' (yellow-red card) 90+6'	Report	Umerah (yellow card) 45+3'; Hessenthaler (red card); Hill (yellow card) 74'	Stadium: Boundary Park; Attendance: 5,651; Referee: James Westgate

9 November 2024 17	Barnet	0–0	Oldham Athletic	Edgware
17:30 GMT	Hartigan (yellow card) 47'; Oluwo (yellow card) 90+5'	Report	Caprice (yellow card) 69'; Kitching (yellow card) 71'; Stones (yellow card) 90+5'; Clucas (yellow card) 90+6'	Stadium: The Hive Stadium; Attendance: 2,230; Referee: Stuart Morland

16 November 2024 18	Oldham Athletic	4–0	Tamworth	Oldham
15:00 GMT	Norwood 16', 38' (pen.), 45+3'; Conlon (yellow card) 29'; Stones (yellow card) 52'; Kay 75'; Clucas (yellow card) 90+6'	Report		Stadium: Boundary Park; Attendance: 6,345; Referee: Garreth Rhodes

23 November 2024 P	Rochdale	Postponed	Oldham Athletic	Rochdale
12:30 GMT		Report		Stadium: Spotland Stadium
Note: The match was postponed on 23 November 2024 because of a waterlogged pitch.

26 November 2024 19	Oldham Athletic	4–0	Boston United	Oldham
19:45 GMT	Lundstram 8'; Norwood 19', (yellow card) 31'; Stones 67'; Fondop 87' (pen.); Ogle (yellow card) 90+4'	Report	Aderoju (yellow card) 79'; Stone (yellow card) 87'	Stadium: Boundary Park; Attendance: 5,013; Referee: Dale Baines

30 November 2024 P	Eastleigh	Postponed	Oldham Athletic	Eastleigh
15:00 GMT		Report		Stadium: Ten Acres
Note: The match was postponed when Oldham reached the FA Cup second round.

14 December 2024 20	Oldham Athletic	3–2	Wealdstone	Oldham
15:00 GMT	Stones 43', 46'; Ogle (yellow card) 56'; Fondop 80' (pen.)	Report	Obiero 3'; Kretzschmar 29'	Stadium: Boundary Park; Attendance: 5,544

21 December 2024 21	Braintree Town	0–2	Oldham Athletic	Braintree
15:00 GMT		Report	Sutton (yellow card) 6'; Stones 15'; Conlon (yellow card) 47'; Norwood 50'	Stadium: Cressing Road; Attendance: 1,046

26 December 2024 P	Oldham Athletic	Postponed	York City	Oldham
15:00 GMT		Report		Stadium: Boundary Park
Note: The match was postponed on 26 December 2024 because of fog.

1 January 2025 22	Hartlepool United	2–1	Oldham Athletic	Hartlepool
15:00 GMT	Waterfall 39'; Gomez Mancini 53', (yellow card) 63'; Smith (yellow card) 76'	Report	Lundstram 20'; Gardner (yellow card) 26'; Monthé (yellow card) 38'; Stones (yellow card) 41'; Clucas (yellow card) 87'	Stadium: Victoria Park; Attendance: 4,502; Referee: Michael Barlow

7 January 2025 23	Eastleigh	2–2	Oldham Athletic	Eastleigh
19:45 GMT	Francillette 22'; Humphries 69'; Waruih (yellow card) 70'; McCallum (yellow card) 76'	Report	Raglan 62', (yellow card) 79'; Fondop 65'; Clucas (yellow card) 70'; Gardner (yellow card) 83'	Stadium: Ten Acres; Attendance: 1,846; Referee: Kirsty Dowle

11 January 2025 P	Oldham Athletic	Postponed	Eastleigh	Oldham
15:00 GMT		Report		Stadium: Boundary Park
Note: The match was postponed on 10 January 2025 because of a frozen pitch.

14 January 2025 P	AFC Fylde	Postponed	Oldham Athletic	Medlar-with-Wesham
19:45 GMT		Report		Stadium: Mill Farm
Note: The match was rearranged on 7 January 2025 following AFC Fylde's departure from the FA Trophy.

18 January 2025 24	Oldham Athletic	1–3	Aldershot Town	Oldham
15:00 GMT	Monthé 41'; Rossiter (yellow card) 77'	Report	Barrett 44', 45+3', 51', (yellow card) 51'; Woodhouse (yellow card) 74'; Hargreaves (yellow card) 84'; Widdrington (yellow card) 85'	Stadium: Boundary Park; Attendance: 5,960; Referee: Richard Eley

21 January 2025 25	Oldham Athletic	0–2	York City	Oldham
19:45 GMT	Ogle (yellow card) 22'; Monthé (yellow card) 65'	Report	Fagan-Walcott 24'; Pearce 38'; Howe (yellow card) 42'; Nathaniel-George (yellow card) 46'; Male (yellow card) 90+1'	Stadium: Boundary Park; Attendance: 8,234; Referee: Stuart Morland

25 January 2025 26	Gateshead	1–1	Oldham Athletic	Gateshead
15:00 GMT	Hannant 63'; Booty (yellow card) 90+2'	Report	Fondop 31'; Caprice (yellow card) 37'; Waters (yellow card) 44'; Pett (yellow card) 46'; Raglan (yellow card) 59'; Rossiter (yellow card) 72'; Worthington (yellow card) 77'	Stadium: Gateshead International Stadium; Attendance: 1,694; Referee: John Mulligan

1 February 2025 P	Oldham Athletic	Postponed	Altrincham	Oldham
15:00 GMT		Report		Stadium: Boundary Park
Note: The match was rearranged on 7 January 2025 following Altrincham's progress in the FA Trophy.

1 February 2025 27	AFC Fylde	1–2	Oldham Athletic	Medlar-with-Wesham
15:00 GMT	Massey (yellow card) 32'; Winterbottom (yellow card) 32'; Hugill (yellow card) 35'; Whelan 49'	Report	Fondop (yellow card) 40', (goal) 62', 90+3'; Leake (yellow card) 11'	Stadium: Mill Farm; Attendance: 2,612; Referee: James Westgate

4 February 2025 28	Rochdale	0–1	Oldham Athletic	Rochdale
19:45 GMT		Report	Fondop 17'; Kay (yellow card) 82'	Stadium: Spotland Stadium; Attendance: 5,880; Referee: Paul Marsden

8 February 2025 29	Solihull Moors	0–1	Oldham Athletic	Solihull
15:00 GMT	Oakley (yellow card) 20'; Stevens (yellow card) 66'	Report	Worthington (yellow card) 18'; Waters 45+1'; Caprice (yellow card) 48'	Stadium: Damson Park; Attendance: 1,686; Referee: Robert Massey-Ellis

11 February 2025 30	Oldham Athletic	2–2	Altrincham	Oldham
19:45 GMT	Raglan (yellow card) 9'; Norwood 57'; Caprice (yellow card) 77'; Lundstram 81'	Report	Olson (yellow card) 13'; Newby 41'; Linney 46', (yellow card) 58'; Golden (yellow card) 85'; Cooper (yellow card) 90+3'	Stadium: Boundary Park; Attendance: 5,491; Referee: Ross Martin

15 February 2025 31	Oldham Athletic	0–0	Sutton United	Oldham
15:00 GMT	Kitching (yellow card) 36'; Norwood (yellow card) 88'	Report	Woodyward (yellow card) 47'; Topalloj (yellow card) 89'	Stadium: Boundary Park; Attendance: 5,738; Referee: Andrew Miller

18 February 2025 32	Oldham Athletic	0–1	Maidenhead United	Oldham
19:45 GMT	Pritchard (yellow card) 47'	Report	Pettit (yellow card) 8' de Havilland (yellow card) 53'; Onariase (yellow card) 59'; McCoulsky 64', (yellow card) 65'; Latty-Fairweather (yellow card) 80'; Ross (yellow card) 88'	Stadium: Boundary Park; Attendance: 5,181; Referee: Aaron Jackson

22 February 2025 33	Dagenham & Redbridge	2–2	Oldham Athletic	Dagenham
15:00 GMT	Loupalo-Bi 45'; Hill (yellow card) 63', (goal) 67' (pen.)	Report	Fondop 48'; Pritchard 90+5'	Stadium: Victoria Road; Attendance: 1,573; Referee: Stephen Parkinson

1 March 2025 34	Oldham Athletic	0–3	Barnet	Oldham
15:00 GMT	Kay (yellow card) 56'	Report	Kanu (yellow card) 45+2'; Brunt 50'; Stead 51'; Oluwo 84'	Stadium: Boundary Park; Attendance: 6,098; Referee: Andrew Humphries

4 March 2025 35	Boston United	0–0	Oldham Athletic	Boston
19:45 GMT	Hill (yellow card) 57'; Rowe (yellow card) 89'; Mills (yellow card) 90'	Report	Pett (yellow card) 28'	Stadium: Boston Community Stadium; Attendance: 1,695; Referee: Scott Simpson

8 March 2025 36	Tamworth	1–1	Oldham Athletic	Tamworth
15:00 GMT	Creaney 42'	Report	Pritchard 36' (pen.); Hobson (yellow card) 51'; Fondop (yellow card) 56'; Rossiter (yellow card) 63'; Norwood (yellow card) 83'; Gardner (yellow card) 90'	Stadium: The Lamb Ground; Attendance: 1,933; Referee: Alan Dale

11 March 2025 37	Oldham Athletic	2–0	Eastleigh	Oldham
19:45 GMT	Waters 8'; Caprice 73'; Pritchard (yellow card) 90+2'	Report	McCallum (yellow card) 74'; Tshikuna (red card) 90+3'	Stadium: Boundary Park; Attendance: 4,769; Referee: Jamie O'Connor

15 March 2025 38	Oldham Athletic	1–1	Rochdale	Oldham
15:00 GMT	Pett (yellow card) 31'; Conlon (yellow card) 34'; Yoganathan 85'	Report	Bird 5'	Stadium: Boundary Park; Attendance: 8,611; Referee: Alex Chilowicz

22 March 2025 39	Oldham Athletic	2–0	Halifax Town	Oldham
15:00 GMT	Harratt 28'; Fondop 90+1'	Report	Alimi-Adetoro (yellow card) 88'	Stadium: Boundary Park; Attendance: 7,256; Referee: Zac Kennard-Kettle

29 March 2025 40	Southend United	1–0	Oldham Athletic	Southend-on-Sea
15:00 GMT	Appiah-Forson 10'; Hopper (yellow card) 69'	Report	Fondop (yellow card) 62'; Caprice (yellow card) 82'	Stadium: Roots Hall; Attendance: 8,395; Referee: Kirsty Dowle

5 April 2025 P	Oldham Athletic	Postponed	Woking	Oldham
15:00 BST		Report		Stadium: Boundary Park
Note: The match was rearranged on 13 March 2025 following Woking's progress in the FA Trophy.

8 April 2025 41	Oldham Athletic	1–2	Woking	Oldham
19:45 BST	Harratt 3'	Report	Kelly-Evans 49'; Walker 58'	Stadium: Boundary Park; Attendance: 5,664; Referee: William Davis

12 April 2025 42	Yeovil Town	2–1	Oldham Athletic	Yeovil
15:00 BST	Lo-Everton 10', 49'; Sims (yellow card) 45+7'; Cousin-Dawson (yellow card) 90+8'	Report	Yoganathan (yellow card) 87'; Caprice 90+3'	Stadium: Huish Park; Attendance: 3,373; Referee: Steven Copeland

18 April 2025 43	Oldham Athletic	2–1	Hartlepool United	Oldham
15:00 BST	Raglan 41'; Pett (yellow card) 44'; Fondop 63', (yellow card) 63'; Hobson (yellow card) 76'; Garner (yellow card) 90+4'	Report	Ferguson (yellow card) 20'; Dieseruvwe 39'; Miley (yellow card) 50'; Cleary (yellow card) 69'	Stadium: Boundary Park; Attendance: 6,717; Referee: Sam Mulhall

21 April 2025 44	York City	1–1	Oldham Athletic	York
15:00 BST	Felix 31'	Report	Sutton (yellow card) 60'; Raglan 70'; Yoganathan (yellow card) 73'; Pritchard (yellow card) 78'	Stadium: York Community Stadium; Attendance: 7,918; Referee: Seb Stockbridge

26 April 2025 45	Forest Green Rovers	1–0	Oldham Athletic	Nailsworth
15:00 BST	McCann 45+5'	Report	Garner (yellow card) 89'	Stadium: The New Lawn; Attendance: 2,801; Referee: Scott Jackson

5 May 2025 46	Oldham Athletic	2–0	Ebbsfleet United	Oldham
15:00 BST	Garner 36' (pen.), 86'; Rossiter (yellow card) 38'; Pritchard (yellow card) 63'	Report	Manktelow (yellow card) 16'; Olagunju (yellow card) 35'; Bolger (yellow card) 41'; Edser (yellow card) 64'	Stadium: Boundary Park; Attendance: 7,493; Referee: Richard Aspinall

==== Matches - Play-offs ====
14 May 2025 Quarter-finals	Oldham Athletic	4–0	Halifax Town	Oldham
19:45 BST	Garner 3', (yellow card) 32'; Kitching 10'; Fondop 12'; Yoganathan (yellow card) 19'; Pritchard 54'	Report	Cooke (yellow card) 64'; Emmerson (yellow card) 67'	Stadium: Boundary Park; Attendance: 10,865; Referee: Aaron Bannister

20 May 2025 Semi-finals	York City	0–3	Oldham Athletic	York
19:45 BST		Report	Garner 23'; Yoganathan 49'; Pritchard 51'	Stadium: York Community Stadium; Attendance: 8,153; Referee: Zac Kennard-Kettle

1 June 2025 Final	Oldham Athletic	3–2 (a.e.t.)	Southend United	Wembley
15:00 BST	Pritchard (yellow card) 45+2'; Garner 48' (pen.); Evans (yellow card) 79'; Monthé (yellow card) 90+2'; Hobson (yellow card) 100'; Norwood 110'; Harratt 112'	Report	Monthé 5' (o.g.); Miley (yellow card) 8'; Hopper (yellow card) 90'; Chambers-Parillon 91'	Stadium: Wembley Stadium; Attendance: 52,115; Referee: Elliot Bell

=== FA Cup ===
Oldham will enter the FA Cup in the fourth qualifying round. Fixtures will take place on the weekend of 12 October 2024, with the draw being made following conclusion of the Third Qualifying Round on the weekend of 28 September 2024.

12 October 2024 Qual R4	Oldham Athletic	4–2	Halifax Town	Oldham
15:00 BST	Fondop 10' 32'; Lundstram 28'; Sutton 41'	Report	Waters 36'; Cummings 76'	Stadium: Boundary Park; Attendance: 3,246; Referee: Richard Aspinall

2 November 2024 First round	Tranmere Rovers	1–2	Oldham Athletic	Birkenhead
15:00 GMT	Jennings 9'; Finley (yellow card) 31'; Turnbull (yellow card) 45+2'; Davies (yellow card) 83'	Report	Caprice (yellow card) 23'; Norwood 39'; Uchegbulam 61'; Kitching (yellow card) 81'	Stadium: Prenton Park; Attendance: 6,464; Referee: Ross Martin

30 November 2024 Second round	Leyton Orient	2–1 (a.e.t.)	Oldham Athletic	Leyton
15:00 GMT	Ball (yellow card) 2'; Keeley 90+9'; Agyei (penalty missed) 105+3', 120+1'; Brown (yellow card) 114'	Report	Monthé 47'; Norwood (yellow card) 52'; Ogle (yellow card) 55'; Fondop (yellow card) 66'; Hudson (yellow card) 69'; Kitching (yellow card) 75'; Caprice (yellow card) 85'; Garner (yellow card) 120+2'	Stadium: Brisbane Road; Attendance: 6,078; Referee: Alan Young

=== FA Trophy ===
Oldham will enter the FA Trophy in the third round. Fixtures will take place on the weekend of 7 December 2024, with the draw being made following conclusion of the second round on the weekend of 16 November 2024.

7 December 2024 Third round	Stockton Town	2–0	Oldham Athletic	Stockton-on-Tees
15:00 GMT	Nicholson 53'; Painter (yellow card) 61'; Sweet 90+5'	Report		Stadium: Bishopton Road West] Attendance: 1,545; Referee: Richard Aspinall

=== National League Cup ===
The Premier League and National League announced the creation of the National League Cup on 25 September 2024, with the first-round games to be played from 1 October 2024. The competition comprised 16 Premier League Under 21 teams and 16 National League teams.

1 October 2024 Group stage	Oldham Athletic	2–1	Stoke City U21	Oldham
19:00 BST	Reid 30'; Charsley (yellow card) 36' (yellow-red card) 88' (goal) 73'; Moloney (yellow card) 80'; Doro (yellow card) 83'	Report	Mears 68'	Stadium: Boundary Park; Attendance: 455

6 November 2024 Group stage	Oldham Athletic	2–2 (2–4 p)	Wolverhampton Wanderers U23	Oldham
19:00 GMT	Stones 21'; Uchegbulam 27'; Clucas (yellow card) 43'	Report	Holman 25' 68'	Stadium: Boundary Park; Attendance: 520; Referee: Aaron Jackson
	Penalties
	Gardner (penalty missed); Khan (penalty scored); Kay (penalty missed); Hammond (penalty scored)		Holman (penalty scored); Okoduwa (penalty scored); Sutherland (penalty scored); Bradbury (penalty scored)

10 December 2024 Group stage	Oldham Athletic	3–2	Blackburn Rovers U23	Oldham
19:00 GMT	Teixeira 18'; Garner 38'; Moore 41'	Report	Powell (yellow card) 17'; Stritch 35'; Houghton (yellow card) 80'; Doherty 90+1'	Stadium: Boundary Park; Attendance: 356; Referee: Callum Jones

29 January 2025 Group stage	Oldham Athletic	0–5	Manchester United U21	Oldham
19:00 GMT		Report	Moorhouse 63'; Obi 70'; Sharpe 72'; Mather 83'; Musa 90+3'	Stadium: Boundary Park; Attendance: 1,895; Referee: Jamie O’Connor

== Squad statistics ==
=== Appearances and goals ===
No.	Pos	Nat	Player	Total		National League		FA Cup		FA Trophy		League Cup		Play-offs	
No.	Pos	Nat	Player	Apps	Goals	Apps	Goals	Apps	Goals	Apps	Goals	Apps	Goals	Apps	Goals
1	GK	(England) ENG	Mathew Hudson	41	0	35+0	0	3+0	0	0+0	0	0+0	0	3+0	0
2	DF	(Australia) AUS	Reagan Ogle	42	1	34+2	1	3+0	0	0+0	0	0+0	0	3+0	0
3	DF	(England) ENG	Mark Kitching	47	4	35+5	3	3+0	0	1+0	0	0+0	0	3+0	1
4	MF	(England) ENG	Sam Clucas	9	0	6+1	0	1+0	0	0+0	0	1+0	0	0+0	0
4	MF	(England) ENG	Tom Pett	24	0	16+5	0	0+0	0	0+0	0	0+0	0	3+0	0
5	DF	(England) ENG	Shaun Hobson	24	0	19+2	0	0+0	0	0+0	0	2+0	0	0+1	0
6	DF	(Cameroon) CMR	Manny Monthé	32	5	27+0	4	2+0	1	0+0	0	0+0	0	3+0	0
7	MF	(England) ENG	Harry Charsley	14	3	7+4	2	0+0	0	1+0	0	2+0	1	0+0	0
8	MF	(England) ENG	Josh Lundstram	41	6	27+10	5	3+0	1	0+0	0	0+0	0	0+1	0
9	FW	(Cameroon) CMR	Mike Fondop	51	20	32+13	17	2+1	2	0+0	0	0+0	0	3+0	1
10	MF	(England) ENG	Tom Conlon	36	0	26+4	0	3+0	0	0+0	0	0+0	0	0+3	0
11	MF	(England) ENG	Josh Kay	26	1	5+16	1	0+2	0	0+0	0	3+0	0	0+0	0
13	GK	(Wales) WAL	Jake Dennis	2	0	1+0	0	0+0	0	0+0	0	1+0	0	0+0	0
14	FW	(England) ENG	Joe Garner	22	6	5+9	2	0+1	0	1+0	0	3+0	1	3+0	3
15	FW	(England) ENG	Jack Stretton	2	0	0+1	0	0+0	0	0+0	0	1+0	0	0+0	0
15	MF	(England) ENG	Jordan Rossiter	24	0	18+3	0	0+0	0	0+0	0	0+0	0	0+3	0
16	DF	(England) ENG	Charlie Raglan	49	5	40+1	5	3+0	0	1+0	0	1+0	0	3+0	0
17	FW	(Nigeria) NGA	Jes Uchegbulam	35	3	12+15	1	0+3	1	1+0	0	2+1	1	0+1	0
18	MF	(England) ENG	Callum Dolan	6	0	3+3	0	0+0	0	0+0	0	0+0	0	0+0	0
18	FW	(England) ENG	Billy Waters	13	2	9+4	2	0+0	0	0+0	0	0+0	0	0+0	0
19	MF	(England) ENG	Dan Gardner	25	0	10+11	0	2+0	0	0+0	0	2+0	0	0+0	0
20	DF	(England) ENG	Jake Caprice	45	2	32+8	2	2+1	0	1+0	0	1+0	0	0+0	0
21	DF	(England) ENG	Will Sutton	22	1	13+2	0	1+0	1	1+0	0	4+0	0	0+1	0
22	DF	(England) ENG	Mo Doro	2	0	0+0	0	0+0	0	0+0	0	1+1	0	0+0	0
22	MF	(England) ENG	Matt Worthington	10	0	5+4	0	0+0	0	0+0	0	1+0	0	0+0	0
23	MF	(England) ENG	Kofi Moore	4	1	0+0	0	0+0	0	0+0	0	2+2	1	0+0	0
24	MF	(Jamaica) JAM	Jordon Garrick	1	0	0+0	0	0+0	0	0+0	0	1+0	0	0+0	0
24	FW	(England) ENG	Josh Stones	7	5	5+1	4	0+0	0	0+0	0	1+0	1	0+0	0
24	MF	(England) ENG	Corry Evans	10	0	2+4	0	0+0	0	1+0	0	0+0	0	3+0	0
25	FW	(England) ENG	Alex Reid	6	1	2+3	0	0+0	0	0+0	0	0+1	1	0+0	0
26	MF	(England) ENG	Kai Payne	5	0	4+0	0	1+0	0	0+0	0	0+0	0	0+0	0
26	FW	(England) ENG	Kian Harratt	10	3	6+3	2	0+0	0	0+0	0	0+0	0	0+1	1
27	MF	(Wales) WAL	Oli Hammond	14	0	6+2	0	0+1	0	1+0	0	4+0	0	0+0	0
28	MF	(Wales) WAL	Vimal Yoganathan	17	2	6+8	1	0+0	0	0+0	0	0+0	0	3+0	1
29	MF	(England) ENG	Joe Pritchard	17	4	6+8	2	0+0	0	0+0	0	0+0	0	3+0	2
30	FW	(England) ENG	James Norwood	31	10	14+11	8	2+1	1	0+0	0	0+0	0	0+3	1
31	FW	(England) ENG	Kane Drummond	10	0	4+3	0	2+1	0	0+0	0	0+0	0	0+0	0
31	GK	(England) ENG	Tom Donaghy	10	0	10+0	0	0+0	0	0+0	0	0+0	0	0+0	0
32	FW	(England) ENG	Samuel Taylor	2	0	0+1	0	0+0	0	0+0	0	1+0	0	0+0	0
33	MF	(Pakistan) PAK	Otis Khan	14	1	2+5	1	0+2	0	1+0	0	4+0	0	0+0	0
34	DF	(England) ENG	Jake Leake	16	0	15+1	0	0+0	0	0+0	0	0+0	0	0+0	0
35	GK	(England) ENG	Scott Moloney	4	0	0+0	0	0+0	0	1+0	0	3+0	0	0+0	0
36	DF	(England) ENG	AJ Amadin	1	0	0+0	0	0+0	0	0+0	0	0+1	0	0+0	0
39	DF	(England) ENG	Ruben Ndienguila	1	0	0+0	0	0+0	0	0+0	0	0+1	0	0+0	0
40	MF	(England) ENG	Dylan Teixeira	2	1	0+0	0	0+0	0	0+0	0	2+0	1	0+0	0
42	FW	(England) ENG	Abubakar Muhammed	4	0	0+0	0	0+0	0	0+1	0	0+3	0	0+0	0
43	DF	(England) ENG	Victor Dielunvuidi	3	0	0+0	0	0+0	0	0+0	0	1+2	0	0+0	0
44	FW	(England) ENG	Theo Andrew	1	0	0+0	0	0+0	0	0+0	0	0+1	0	0+0	0

=== Disciplinary record ===
No.	Pos.	Nat.	Player	National League		FA Cup		FA Trophy		NL Cup		Total	
No.	Pos.	Nat.	Player	Booked	Sent off (straight red)	Booked	Sent off (straight red)	Booked	Sent off (straight red)	Booked	Sent off (straight red)	Booked	Sent off (straight red)
11	MF	(England)	Josh Kay	3	1	0	0	0	0	0	0	3	1
33	MF	(Pakistan)	Otis Khan	0	1	0	0	0	0	0	0	0	1
7	MF	(England)	Harry Charsley	0	1	0	0	0	0	0	0	0	1
16	DF	(England)	Charlie Raglan	8	0	0	0	0	0	0	0	8	0
9	FW	(Cameroon)	Mike Fondop	7	0	1	0	0	0	0	0	8	0
20	DF	(England)	Jake Caprice	6	0	2	0	0	0	0	0	8	0
2	DF	(Australia)	Reagan Ogle	6	0	1	0	0	0	0	0	7	0
10	MF	(England)	Tom Conlon	6	0	0	0	0	0	0	0	6	0
30	FW	(England)	James Norwood	4	0	1	0	0	0	0	0	5	0
6	DF	(Cameroon)	Manny Monthé	6	0	0	0	0	0	0	0	6	0
4	MF	(England)	Sam Clucas	4	0	0	0	0	0	1	0	5	0
3	DF	(England)	Mark Kitching	3	0	2	0	0	0	0	0	5	0
19	MF	(England)	Dan Gardner	4	0	0	0	0	0	0	0	4	0
4	MF	(England)	Tom Pett	4	0	0	0	0	0	0	0	4	0
15	MF	(England)	Jordan Rossiter	4	0	0	0	0	0	0	0	4	0
29	MF	(England)	Joe Pritchard	5	0	0	0	0	0	0	0	5	0
1	GK	(England)	Mathew Hudson	3	0	1	0	0	0	0	0	4	0
14	FW	(England)	Joe Garner	3	0	1	0	0	0	0	0	4	0
17	FW	(Nigeria)	Jes Uchegbulam	3	0	0	0	0	0	0	0	3	0
21	DF	(England)	Will Sutton	3	0	0	0	0	0	0	0	3	0
28	MF	(Wales)	Vimal Yoganathan	3	0	0	0	0	0	0	0	3	0
24	FW	(England)	Josh Stones	2	0	0	0	0	0	0	0	2	0
22	MF	(England)	Matt Worthington	2	0	0	0	0	0	0	0	2	0
5	DF	(England)	Shaun Hobson	3	0	0	0	0	0	0	0	3	0
8	MF	(England)	Josh Lundstram	1	0	0	0	0	0	0	0	1	0
18	FW	(England)	Billy Waters	1	0	0	0	0	0	0	0	1	0
18	MF	(England)	Callum Dolan	1	0	0	0	0	0	0	0	1	0
34	DF	(England)	Jake Leake	1	0	0	0	0	0	0	0	1	0
35	GK	(England)	Scott Moloney	0	0	0	0	0	0	1	0	1	0
22	DF	(England)	Mo Doro	0	0	0	0	0	0	1	0	1	0
24	MF	(Northern Ireland)	Corry Evans	1	0	0	0	0	0	0	0	1	0
Total				97	2	9	0	0	0	3	1	109	3

== Transfers ==
=== Transfers in ===
Date	Position	Nationality	Name	From	Fee	Ref.
Pre-season	DF	(Australia)	Reagan Ogle	(England) Scunthorpe United	-	
Pre-season	MF	(Nigeria)	Jes Uchegbulam	(England) Rochdale	-	
Pre-season	MF	(England)	Josh Kay	(England) AFC Fylde	-	
Pre-season	DF	(Cameroon)	Manny Monthe	(England) Northampton Town	-	
Pre-season	MF	(England)	Harry Charsley	(England) Newport County	-	
Pre-season	DF	(England)	Jake Caprice	-	-	
Pre-season	GK	(England)	Scott Moloney	-	-	
30 August 2024	MF	(Pakistan)	Otis Khan	(England) Grimsby Town	Free Transfer	
31 October 2024	MF	(England)	Sam Clucas	-	-	
15 January 2025	MF	(Northern Ireland)	Corry Evans	-	-	
16 January 2025	FW	(England)	Billy Waters	-	-	
24 January 2025	MF	(England)	Matt Worthington	(England) Yeovil Town	Free Transfer	
4 February 2025	MF	(England)	Joe Pritchard	(England) MK Dons	-	
14 February 2025	GK	(England)	Tom Donaghy	(England) Fleetwood Town	-	

=== Transfers out ===
Date	Position	Nationality	Name	To	Fee	Ref.
Pre-Season	MF	(England)	Mark Shelton	(England) Barnet	Released	
Pre-Season	MF	(England)	Nathan Sheron	(England) Hartlepool United	Undisclosed fee	
Pre-Season	MF	(England)	Dan Ward	(England) South Shields	Released	
27 September 2024	DF	(England)	Liam Hogan	-	Released	
2 January 2025	GK	(England)	Magnus Norman	(England) Dorking Wanderers	Released	
17 January 2025	MF	(England)	Sam Clucas	(England) Lincoln City	Free Transfer	

=== Loans in ===
Date from	Position	Nationality	Name	From	Date until	Ref.
23 August 2024	MF	(England)	Callum Dolan	(England) Fleetwood Town	2 January 2025	
27 September 2024	FW	(England)	Jack Stretton	(England) Stockport County	24 October 2024 (Note: Stretton was initially announced as being on loan until 5 January 2025 but was recalled by Stockport County on 24 October 2024.)	
4 October 2024	FW	(England)	Kane Drummond	(England) Chesterfield	3 December 2024 (Note: Drummond was initially announced as being on loan until 5 January 2025 but was recalled by Stockport County on 3 December 2024.)	
14 October 2024	MF	(England)	Kai Payne	(England) Wigan Athletic	11 November 2024	
5 November 2024	FW	(England)	Josh Stones	(England) Wigan Athletic	2 January 2025	
30 December 2024	FW	(England)	Sam Taylor	(England) Tranmere Rovers	30 January 2025	
10 January 2025	MF	(England)	Jordan Rossiter	(England) Shrewsbury Town	2 June 2025	
13 January 2025	GK	(Wales)	Jake Dennis	(Wales) Cardiff City	30 June 2025	
17 January 2025	DF	(England)	Jake Leake	(England) Hull City	End of Season	
20 January 2025	MF	(England)	Tom Pett	(England) Cheltenham Town	End of Season	

=== Loans out ===
Date from	Position	Nationality	Name	To	Date until	Ref.
Pre-Season	FW	(England)	Joe Nuttall	(England) Altrincham	End of Season	
Pre-Season	FW	(England)	Kurt Willoughby	(England) Chester	End of Season	
8 October 2024	FW	(England)	Alex Reid	(England) Wealdstone	5 January 2025	
12 October 2024	DF	(England)	Mo Doro	(England) Radcliffe	1 January 2025	
3 January 2025	MF	(England)	Kofi Moore	(England) Nantwich Town	End of Season	
23 January 2025	FW	(England)	Alex Reid	(England) Wealdstone	End of Season	
23 January 2025	FW	(England)	Jesurun Uchegbulam	(England) Eastleigh	3 March 2025 (Note: Uchegbulam was initially announced as being on loan until the end of the season but was recalled on 3 March 2025.)	
