= 2025 National League play-off final =

- Event: 2024–25 National League
Oldham Athletic	Southend United
3	2
- After extra time
- Date: 1 June 2025
- Venue: Wembley Stadium, London
- Man of the Match: Tom Pett
- Referee: Elliot Bell
- Attendance: 52,115

The 2025 National League play-off final, known as the Vanarama National League Promotion Final for sponsorship reasons, was an association football match played on 1 June 2025 at Wembley Stadium, London, between Oldham Athletic and Southend United.

The match determined the second and final team to gain promotion from the National League, the fifth tier of English football, to EFL League Two. The champions of the 2024–25 National League season gained automatic promotion to EFL League Two, while the teams placed from second to seventh took part in the play-offs; Oldham Athletic finished in fifth position while Southend United finished in seventh position, both going through the eliminator rounds to get to the final.

The 2025 final was the 23rd National League play-off final in all. The attendance of 52,115 was a record for a National League match, beating the previous best of 47,029 when Bristol Rovers defeated Grimsby Town to win promotion at the same venue in the 2015 final.

== Route to the final ==
National League final table, leading positions
Pos	Team	Pld	W	D	L	GF	GA	GD	Pts
1	Barnet	46	31	9	6	97	38	+59	102
2	York City	46	29	9	8	95	42	+53	96
3	Forest Green Rovers	46	22	17	7	69	42	+27	83
4	Rochdale	46	21	11	14	69	44	+25	74
5	Oldham Athletic	46	19	16	11	64	48	+16	73
6	FC Halifax Town	46	19	13	14	50	46	+4	70
7	Southend United	46	17	17	12	59	48	+11	68

=== Quarter-finals ===
14 May 2025	Oldham Athletic	4–0	FC Halifax Town	Oldham
19:45 BST	Garner 4'; Kitching 10'; Fondop 13'; Pritchard 54'	Report		Stadium: Boundary Park; Attendance: 10,865; Referee: Aaron Bannister

15 May 2025	Rochdale	3–4 (a.e.t.)	Southend United	Rochdale
19:45 BST	Rodney 8', 56' (pen.); Bird 28'	Report	Ralph 22'; Hopper 74'; Parillon 80'; Kendall 101'	Stadium: Spotland Stadium; Attendance: 5,560; Referee: Andrew Humphries

=== Semi-finals ===
20 May 2025	York City	0–3	Oldham Athletic	York
19:45 BST		Report	Garner 23'; Yoganathan 49'; Pritchard 51'	Stadium: York Community Stadium; Attendance: 8,153; Referee: Zac Kennard-Kettle

21 May 2025	Forest Green Rovers	2–2 (a.e.t.) (2–4 p)	Southend United	Nailsworth
19:45 BST	Inniss 62'; Osadebe 94'		Goodliffe 54'; Bridge 116'	Stadium: The New Lawn; Attendance: 3,937; Referee: David Rock

== Match ==
=== Details ===
1 June 2025
15:00 BST

Oldham Athletic	3–2 (a.e.t.)	Southend United
Garner 48' (pen.); Norwood 110'; Harratt 112'	Report	Monthé 5' (o.g.); Chambers-Parillon 91'

Wembley Stadium, London
Attendance: 52,115
Referee: Elliot Bell

Oldham Athletic	Southend United

GK	1	(England) Mathew Hudson
CB	2	(Australia) Reagan Ogle
CB	16	(England) Charlie Raglan (c)
CB	6	(Cameroon) Manny Monthé	(yellow card) 90+2'
RM	29	(England) Joe Pritchard	(yellow card) 45+2'	(substituted off) 67'
CM	24	(Northern Ireland) Corry Evans	(yellow card) 79'	(substituted off) 101'
CM	28	(Wales) Vimal Yoganathan		(substituted off) 84'
CM	4	(England) Tom Pett
LM	3	(England) Mark Kitching		(substituted off) 98'
CF	9	(Cameroon) Mike Fondop
CF	14	(England) Joe Garner		(substituted off) 75'
Substitutes:
GK	31	(England) Tom Donaghy
DF	5	(England) Shaun Hobson	(yellow card) 100'	(substituted on) 98'
MF	10	(England) Tom Conlon		(substituted on) 84'
MF	15	(England) Jordan Rossiter		(substituted on) 114'
FW	17	(Nigeria) Jesurun Uchegbulam	(substituted off) 114'	(substituted on) 67'
FW	26	(England) Kian Harratt		(substituted on) 101'
FW	30	(England) James Norwood		(substituted on) 75'
Manager:
(Scotland) Micky Mellon

GK	1	(England) Nick Hayes
CB	16	(England) Harry Taylor
CB	20	(England) Ben Goodliffe
CB	3	(England) Nathan Ralph (c)
RM	2	(England) Gus Scott-Morriss
CM	22	(England) Keenan Forson		(substituted off) 114'
CM	8	(Afghanistan) Noor Husin
CM	17	(England) Cav Miley	(yellow card) 8'	(substituted off) 77'
LM	7	(England) Jack Bridge		(substituted off) 64'
CF	21	(England) Tom Hopper	(yellow card) 90'	(substituted off) 93'
CF	24	(England) Charley Kendall		(substituted off) 64'
Substitutes:
GK	25	(England) Nathan Harness
DF	4	(England) George Wind
DF	15	(England) Joe Gubbins		(substituted on) 114'
MF	19	(England) Leon Chambers-Parillon		(substituted on) 64'
MF	28	(England) Oli Coker		(substituted on) 77'
FW	9	(Zimbabwe) Macauley Bonne		(substituted on) 64'
FW	11	(England) Josh Walker		(substituted on) 93'
Manager:
(Republic of Ireland) Kevin Maher
