= 2026–27 Oldham Athletic A.F.C. season =

132nd season in existence of Oldham Athletic AFC

Oldham Athletic
2026–27 season
- Chairman: Frank Rothwell
- Manager: Micky Mellon
- Stadium: Boundary Park
- EFL Cup: First round

The 2026–27 season is the 132nd season in the history of Oldham Athletic Football Club and their second consecutive season in League Two. In addition to the domestic league, the club would also participate in the FA Cup, the EFL Cup, and the EFL Trophy.

== Transfers and contracts ==
=== In ===
Date	Pos.	Player	From	Fee	Ref.
1 July 2026 (Note: The transfer was announced on 19 June, and would become official on July 1 once Appiah-Forson's contract at Southend United expired.)	CDM	(England) Keenan Appiah-Forson	(England) Southend United	Free	
1 July 2026 (Note: The transfer was announced on 29 May, and would become official on July 1 once Nevitt's contract at Gillingham had expired.)	CF	(England) Elliott Nevitt	(England) Gillingham	Free	
1 July 2026 (Note: The transfer was announced on 3 June, and would become official on July 1 once Norburn's contract at Notts County expired.)	CM	(Grenada) Oliver Norburn	(England) Notts County	Free	
1 July 2026 (Note: The transfer was announced on 28 May, and would become official on July 1 once Scott-Morriss' contract at Southend United expired.)	RB	(England) Gus Scott-Morriss	(England) Southend United	Free	
1 July 2026 (Note: The transfer was announced on 15 June, and would become official on July 1 once Wilson's contract at Barnsley expired.)	GK	(England) Aston Wilson	(England) Barnsley	Free	
8 July 2026	CAM	(England) Noah Chilvers	(Scotland) Ross County	Undisclosed	
13 July 2026	CB	(Republic of Ireland) Ryan Delaney	(England) Swindon Town	Free	
4 August 2026	CM	(Wales) Tom Hill	(England) Harrogate Town	Free	

=== Out ===
Date	Pos.	Player	To	Fee	Ref.

=== Loaned in ===
Date	Pos.	Player	From	Loaned until	Ref.
27 July 2026	CB	(England) Zain Tahir	(England) Sheffield United	End of Season	
30 July 2026	RW	(England) Favour Fawunmi	(England) Stoke City	End of Season	
4 August 2026	CM	(England) Kai Payne	(England) Wigan Athletic	End of Season	
6 August 2026	CB	(Republic of Ireland) Lewis Temple	(England) Bolton Wanderers	End of Season	

=== Loaned out ===
Date	Pos.	Player	To	Loaned until	Ref.
15 June 2026 (Note: The loan was announced on 12 June, and would become official on June 15 once the transfer window opened.)	GK	(England) Tom Donaghy	(England) Radcliffe	4 January 2027	
5 September 2026	CDM	(England) Ryan Woods	(England) Solihull Moors	5 December 2026	

=== Released / Out of Contract ===
Date	Pos.	Player	Subsequent club	Joined date	Ref.
30 June 2026	CM	(England) Tom Conlon	(England) Tranmere Rovers	1 July 2026	
30 June 2026	LB	(England) Jake Leake	(England) Colchester United	1 July 2026	
30 June 2026	RB	(Australia) Reagan Ogle	(England) Scunthorpe United	1 July 2026	
30 June 2026	CB	(England) Dynel Simeu	(Wales) The New Saints	1 July 2026	
30 June 2026	SS	(England) Billy Waters	(England) Chester	1 July 2026	
30 June 2026	CF	(England) Joe Garner	(England) Morecambe	7 July 2026	
30 June 2026	CF	(England) Kian Harratt	(England) Worksop Town	15 July 2026	
30 June 2026	LM	(England) Josh Kay	(England) Macclesfield	1 August 2026	
30 June 2026	RB	(England) Jake Caprice			
30 June 2026	RM	(England) Kieron Morris			

=== New Contract ===
Date	Pos.	Player	Contract expiry	Ref.
4 May 2026	CF	(England) Kane Drummond	30 June 2027	
27 May 2026	CB	(Cameroon) Manny Monthé	30 June 2028 (Note: Includes option of a further year)	

== Pre-season and friendlies ==
On 8 June, The Latics announced three pre-season fixtures against Bolton Wanderers, Stockport County and Sheffield Wednesday along with a training camp at St Andrews in Scotland.

Win Draw Loss

21 July 2026 Friendly	Oldham Athletic	1–3	Bolton Wanderers	Oldham
19:00 BST	Kavanagh 82' (pen.)	Report	Rodrigues 12', 24'; McAtee 86'	Stadium: Boundary Park; Attendance: 2,585 (760 away); Referee: Matt McQuillan

24 July 2026 Friendly	Huddersfield Town	3–1	Oldham Athletic	Huddersfield
15:00 BST	Iorpenda 52'; Tawodzera 83'; Onyeka 85'		Fondop 74'	Stadium: Canalside; Attendance: 0 (BCD)

28 July 2026 Friendly	Oldham Athletic	0–1	Stockport County	Oldham
19:00 BST	Fondop (red card) 75'	Report	Mothersille 61'	Stadium: Boundary Park; Attendance: 2,326 (768 away); Referee: Sunny Singh Gill

1 August 2026 Friendly	Oldham Athletic	4–0	Sheffield Wednesday	Oldham
16:00 BST	Kavanagh 14'; Appiah-Forson 45'; Trialist 71'; Chilvers 90'	Report		Stadium: Boundary Park; Attendance: 3,276 (1,612 away); Referee: Abid Hussain

== Competitions ==
=== Overall record ===
Competition	First match	Last match	Starting round	Final position	Record							
Competition	First match	Last match	Starting round	Final position	Pld	W	D	L	GF	GA	GD	Win %
League Two	August 2026	May 2027	Matchday 1	TBD	0	0	0	0	0	0	+0	—
FA Cup	November 2026	TBD	First round	TBD	0	0	0	0	0	0	+0	—
EFL Cup	August 2026	TBD	Preliminary round	TBD	0	0	0	0	0	0	+0	—
EFL Trophy	September 2026	TBD	Group stage	TBD	0	0	0	0	0	0	+0	—
Total					0	0	0	0	0	0	+0	—

Last updated: pre-season
Source: Soccerway

=== EFL League Two ===
==== League table ====
Pos	Team	Pld	W	D	L	GF	GA	GD	Pts
18	Bristol Rovers	15	5	1	9	17	25	−8	16
19	Northampton Town	14	3	6	5	10	11	−1	15
20	Oldham Athletic	15	4	3	8	16	21	−5	15
21	Colchester United	14	3	6	5	14	19	−5	15
22	Rochdale	15	4	3	8	17	27	−10	15

Updated to match(es) played on 14 November 2026. Source: EFL Official Website
Rules for classification: 1) Points; 2) Goal difference; 3) Number of goals scored; 4) Head-to-head results; 5) Wins; 6) Away goals; 7) Penalty points (sec 9.5); 8) 12-point sending off offences

==== Results summary ====
Overall								Home						Away					
Pld	W	D	L	GF	GA	GD	Pts	W	D	L	GF	GA	GD	W	D	L	GF	GA	GD
15	4	3	8	16	21	−5	15	3	1	3	11	8	+3	1	2	5	5	13	−8

Last updated: 14 November 2026.
Source: Soccerway

==== Results by round ====
Round	1	2	3	4	5	6	7	8	10	11	12	13	14	9^{1}	15	16	17	18	19	20	21	22	23	24	25	26	27	28	29	30	31
Ground	H	A	H	A	A	H	A	H	H	H	A	A	H	A	A	H	A	H	H	A	H	A	A	H	A	H	H	A	A	H	H
Result	W	L	W	D	L	L	L	L	D	W	L	D	L	W	L																
Position	4	12	6	5	10	14	16	20	21	19	21	20	21	18	20																
Points	3	3	6	7	7	7	7	7	8	11	11	12	12	15	15																

Source: EFL
A = Away; H = Home; W = Win; D = Draw; L = Loss; P = Postponed
Notes:
- ^{1} Matchday 9 (vs. Northampton Town) was postponed due to international call-ups.

==== Matches ====
On 25 June, the League Two fixtures were revealed.

Win Draw Loss Fixtures

15 August 2026 1	Oldham Athletic	2–0	Port Vale	Oldham
12:30 BST	Norburn (yellow card) 13'; Fawunmi (yellow card) 40'; Kavanagh 60', 75'	Report	Hall (yellow card) 39'; Byers (yellow card) 57'; Gabriel (yellow card) 59'; Gordon (yellow card) 87'	Stadium: Boundary Park; Attendance: 9,449 (2,000 away); Referee: Paul Howard

22 August 2026 2	Colchester United	2–1	Oldham Athletic	Colchester
15:00 BST	Iandolo (yellow card) 28'; Vincent-Young (yellow card) 36'; Anderson 63'; Payne (penalty missed) 75'; Temple 90+4' (o.g.)	Report	Appiah-Forson 20'; Kavanagh (yellow card) 30'; Scott-Morriss (red card) 45+2'; Norburn (yellow card) 51'; Hudson (yellow card) 75'; Daniels (yellow card) 88'; Nevitt (yellow card) 90+2'	Stadium: JobServe Community Stadium; Attendance: 5,186 (764 away); Referee: James Durkin

29 August 2026 3	Oldham Athletic	3–0	Swindon Town	Oldham
15:00 BST	Nevitt 41'; Kavanagh 84' (pen.); Fondop 90+5'	Report	Clarke (yellow card) 71'; Majekodunmi (yellow card) 75'; Ripley (yellow card) 83'	Stadium: Boundary Park; Attendance: 7,589 (539 away); Referee: Dean Whitestone

1 September 2026 4	Fleetwood Town	1–1	Oldham Athletic	Fleetwood
19:45 BST	Neal (yellow card) 5'; Coughlan 88'	Report	Drummond 45'	Stadium: Highbury Stadium; Attendance: 3,085; Referee: William Davis

5 September 2026 5	Tranmere Rovers	2–0	Oldham Athletic	Birkenhead
15:00 BST	Jones 17'; Slater (yellow card) 43'; McGee (yellow card) 79'; Ironside 82' (pen.); Ince (yellow card) 90'	Report	Norburn (yellow card) 8'; Robson (yellow card) 11'	Stadium: Prenton Park; Referee: Seb Stockbridge

12 September 2026 6	Oldham Athletic	1–2	Chesterfield	Oldham
15:00 BST	Norburn (yellow card) 28'; Fawunmi 50'; Delaney (yellow card) 55'		Bonis 18'; Hutton (yellow card) 30'; McFadzean (yellow card) 37'; Markanday 52'; Eccleston (yellow card) 82'	Stadium: Boundary Park; Referee: Matthew Corlett

19 September 2026 7	Rochdale	2–0	Oldham Athletic	Spotland
12:30 BST	Moss 7'; Brown 63'	Report		Stadium: Crown Oil Arena; Attendance: 6,121; Referee: Stephen Parkinson
Note: Fixture was initially scheduled for a 15:00 kick-off, but was brought forward for live Sky Sports.

26 September 2026 8	Oldham Athletic	1–4	Salford City	Oldham
17:30 BST	Kavanagh 21'	Report	Molyneux 5'; N'Mai 19'; Odoh (yellow card) 34'; Langstaff (yellow card) 45+2'; Wiredu 57'; Oluwo 81'	Stadium: Boundary Park; Attendance: 8,071 (849 away); Referee: Isaac Searle
Note: Fixture was initially scheduled for a 15:00 kick-off, but was pushed back for live Sky Sports.

10 October 2026 10	Oldham Athletic	0–0	Accrington Stanley	Oldham
12:30 BST	Temple (yellow card) 11'; Drummond (yellow card) 75'; Robson (yellow card) 83'	Report	Anderson (yellow card) 8'; Tutonda (yellow card) 80'	Stadium: Boundary Park; Attendance: 6,756 (356 away); Referee: Ben Toner
Note: Fixture was initially scheduled for a 15:00 kick-off, but was brought forward for live Sky Sports broadcasting.

17 October 2026 11	Oldham Athletic	4–1	Cheltenham Town	Oldham
15:00 BST	Kavanagh 19'; Robson 25', 81'; Fawunmi 41'	Report	McWilliams (yellow card) 18'; McCann (yellow card) 24'; Willcox 45+1'	Stadium: Boundary Park; Attendance: 6,361; Referee: Scott Oldham

20 October 2026 12	Walsall	3–0	Oldham Athletic	Bescot
19:45 BST	Sodje (yellow card) 9', (goal) 21'; Crew (yellow card) 20'; Pressley 26', 58' (pen.); Simper (yellow card) 32'; Ahui (red card) 61'	Report	Robson (yellow card) 40'; Hudson (yellow card) 58'; Fawunmi (yellow card) 62'	Stadium: Pallet-Track Bescot Stadium; Attendance: 5,147; Referee: Alan Dale

24 October 2026 13	Barnet	1–1	Oldham Athletic	Edgware
15:00 BST	Tshimanga 20'; Noel-Williams (yellow card) 66' (red card) 70'	Report	Fondop (yellow card) 86', (goal) 90+5'	Stadium: The Hive Stadium; Attendance: 2,632; Referee: Alan Young

31 October 2026 14	Oldham Athletic	0–1	Crawley Town	Oldham
15:00 GMT	Payne (red card) 14'; Drummond (red card) 30'; Hill (yellow card) 60'; Daniels (yellow card) 63'	Report	Jennings (yellow card) 25'; Orsi 52'; Russell (yellow card) 72'; Gordon (yellow card) 85'	Stadium: Boundary Park; Attendance: 6,468 (124 away); Referee: David Rock

3 November 2026 9	Northampton Town	0–1	Oldham Athletic	Sixfields
19:45 GMT	Dale (yellow card) 64'	Report	Norburn 70'	Stadium: Sixfields Stadium; Attendance: 5,098; Referee: Carl Brook
Note: Fixture was originally scheduled for 3 October, but was postponed due to international call-ups.

14 November 2026 15	Shrewsbury Town	2–1	Oldham Athletic	Shrewsbury
15:00 GMT	Berkoe 73'; Davison 77'; Brook (yellow card) 90+3'	Report	Daniels (yellow card) 82'; Fawunmi 90+3'; Appiah-Forson (yellow card) 90+3'	Stadium: Croud Meadow; Attendance: 7,004 (1,063 away); Referee: Ross Martin

21 November 2026 16	Oldham Athletic	v	Exeter City	Oldham
15:00 GMT				Stadium: Boundary Park

28 November 2026 17	Rotherham United	v	Oldham Athletic	Rotherham
15:00 GMT				Stadium: AESSEAL New York Stadium

1 December 2026 18	Oldham Athletic	v	Bristol Rovers	Oldham
19:45 GMT				Stadium: Boundary Park

12 December 2026 19	Oldham Athletic	v	Gillingham	Oldham
15:00 GMT				Stadium: Boundary Park

19 December 2026 20	Newport County	v	Oldham Athletic	Newport
15:00 GMT				Stadium: Rodney Parade

26 December 2026 21	Oldham Athletic	v	York City	Oldham
15:00 GMT				Stadium: Boundary Park

29 December 2026 22	Grimsby Town	v	Oldham Athletic	Cleethorpes
19:45 GMT				Stadium: Blundell Park

1 January 2027 23	Crewe Alexandra	v	Oldham Athletic	Crewe
15:00 GMT				Stadium: Mornflake Stadium

9 January 2027 24	Oldham Athletic	v	Newport County	Oldham
15:00 GMT				Stadium: Boundary Park

16 January 2027 25	Cheltenham Town	v	Oldham Athletic	Cheltenham
15:00 GMT				Stadium: EV Charger Points Stadium

19 January 2027 26	Oldham Athletic	v	Walsall	Oldham
19:45 GMT				Stadium: Boundary Park

23 January 2027 27	Oldham Athletic	v	Barnet	Oldham
15:00 GMT				Stadium: Boundary Park

30 January 2027 28	Crawley Town	v	Oldham Athletic	Crawley
15:00 GMT				Stadium: Broadfield Stadium

6 February 2027 29	Swindon Town	v	Oldham Athletic	Swindon
15:00 GMT				Stadium: County Ground

9 February 2027 30	Oldham Athletic	v	Fleetwood Town	Oldham
19:45 GMT				Stadium: Boundary Park

13 February 2027 31	Oldham Athletic	v	Tranmere Rovers	Oldham
12:30 GMT				Stadium: Boundary Park
Note: Fixture was initially scheduled for a 15:00 kick-off, but was brought forward for live Sky Sports broadcasting.

=== FA Cup ===
Oldham were drawn at home to Sheffield Wednesday in the first round and away to Grimsby Town in the second round.

Win Draw Loss Fixtures

8 November 2026 First round	Oldham Athletic	2–1 (a.e.t.)	Sheffield Wednesday	Oldham
17:15 GMT	Kavanagh 66'; Scott-Morriss (yellow card) 90+1'; Monthé (yellow card) 105'; Sutton 110'	Report	Bernard (yellow card) 7'; Valery (yellow card) 29'; Keillor-Dunn 76'; Slattery (yellow card) 85'; Fusire (yellow card) 90'	Stadium: Boundary Park; Attendance: 6,545; Referee: Martin Woods
Note: Match was selected for live TNT Sports broadcasting.

4–7 December 2026 Second round	Grimsby Town	v	Oldham Athletic	Cleethorpes
TBA GMT				Stadium: Blundell Park

=== EFL Cup ===
Oldham were drawn away to Stoke City in the first round.

Win Draw Loss Fixtures

8 August 2026 First round	Stoke City	2–0	Oldham Athletic	Stoke-on-Trent
15:00 BST	Lawal (yellow card) 19'; Norburn 48' (o.g.); Bae Jun-ho (yellow card) 68'; Boženík 82'	Report	Delaney (yellow card) 31'	Stadium: bet365 Stadium; Attendance: 10,157 (2,212 away); Referee: Edward Duckworth

=== EFL Trophy ===
==== Group stage ====
Oldham were drawn against Fleetwood Town, Barnsley and Leeds United U21 into Northern Group G.

Pos	Div	Team	Pld	W	PW	PL	L	GF	GA	GD	Pts	Qualification
1	L2	Oldham Athletic (A)	3	2	0	0	1	7	7	0	6	Advance to Round 2
2	L2	Fleetwood Town	2	1	0	0	1	4	2	+2	3	Advance to Round 2
3	L1	Barnsley (E)	3	1	0	0	2	9	10	−1	3	
4	ACA	Leeds United U21	2	1	0	0	1	6	7	−1	3	

Updated to match(es) played on 11 November 2026. Source: EFL
(A) Advances to a further round; (E) Eliminated

Win Draw Loss Fixtures

22 September 2026 Group stage	Oldham Athletic	1–0	Fleetwood Town	Oldham
19:00 BST	Chilvers 46'; Kavanagh (yellow card) 90+4'	Report	Rooney (yellow card) 55'; Cirino (yellow card) 85'	Stadium: Boundary Park; Attendance: 851 (91 away); Referee: Michael Barlow

13 October 2026 Group stage	Oldham Athletic	4–2	Leeds United U21	Oldham
19:00 BST	Chilvers 27' (pen.); Drummond 53'; Hawkes 66'; Payne 68'		Mills 32'; Njinko 51'	Stadium: Boundary Park; Referee: Callum Jones

11 November 2026 Group stage	Barnsley	5–2	Oldham Athletic	Barnsley
19:00 GMT	Kirk 25', 41'; Johnson 32'; Ravenhill (yellow card) 53'; Alker 67'; Yoganathan 89'	Report	Nevitt (yellow card) 37'; Hill 63'; Drummond 71'	Stadium: Oakwell; Attendance: 1,025 (327 away); Referee: Aaron Jackson
Note: Fixture was initially scheduled for 10 November, but was pushed back a day due to FA Cup involvements on the preceding Sunday.

== Statistics ==
=== Appearances and goals ===
As of match played 14 November 2026

Players with no appearances are not included on the list; italics indicate a loaned in player

No.	Pos	Nat	Player	Total		League Two		FA Cup		EFL Cup		EFL Trophy	
No.	Pos	Nat	Player	Apps	Goals	Apps	Goals	Apps	Goals	Apps	Goals	Apps	Goals
1	GK	(England) ENG	Mathew Hudson	18	0	15+0	0	1+0	0	1+0	0	1+0	0
2	DF	(England) ENG	Gus Scott-Morriss	15	0	11+1	0	1+0	0	1+0	0	0+1	0
3	DF	(Scotland) SCO	Jamie Robson	17	2	15+0	2	1+0	0	1+0	0	0+0	0
4	MF	(England) ENG	Tom Pett	15	0	5+6	0	1+0	0	1+0	0	2+0	0
5	DF	(Montserrat) MSR	Donervon Daniels	16	0	14+0	0	1+0	0	1+0	0	0+0	0
6	DF	(Cameroon) CMR	Manny Monthé	14	0	9+3	0	1+0	0	0+0	0	0+1	0
7	MF	(England) ENG	Keenan Appiah-Forson	14	1	12+1	1	0+0	0	1+0	0	0+0	0
8	MF	(England) ENG	Oliver Norburn	17	1	15+0	1	1+0	0	1+0	0	0+0	0
9	FW	(England) ENG	Mike Fondop	19	2	9+6	2	1+0	0	1+0	0	1+1	0
10	FW	(Republic of Ireland) IRL	Calum Kavanagh	18	6	13+2	5	1+0	1	1+0	0	0+1	0
14	MF	(England) ENG	Noah Chilvers	11	2	2+5	0	1+0	0	0+0	0	3+0	2
15	FW	(England) ENG	Kane Drummond	17	3	10+3	1	0+0	0	1+0	0	2+1	2
16	DF	(England) ENG	Will Sutton	11	1	6+1	0	1+0	1	0+0	0	3+0	0
17	FW	(England) ENG	Favour Fawunmi	15	3	11+2	3	0+0	0	0+0	0	2+0	0
18	MF	(England) ENG	Ryan Woods	2	0	0+2	0	0+0	0	0+0	0	0+0	0
19	DF	(England) ENG	Zain Tahir	3	0	0+0	0	0+0	0	0+0	0	3+0	0
20	FW	(England) ENG	Elliott Nevitt	13	1	3+6	1	0+1	0	0+1	0	2+0	0
21	MF	(England) ENG	Josh Hawkes	7	1	0+3	0	0+1	0	0+1	0	1+1	1
22	GK	(England) ENG	Aston Wilson	2	0	0+0	0	0+0	0	0+0	0	2+0	0
23	DF	(Republic of Ireland) IRL	Ryan Delaney	9	0	7+0	0	0+0	0	1+0	0	1+0	0
24	DF	(Republic of Ireland) IRL	Lewis Temple	8	0	2+2	0	0+0	0	0+1	0	3+0	0
26	MF	(England) ENG	Kai Payne	9	1	3+2	0	0+0	0	0+1	0	3+0	1
27	MF	(Wales) WAL	Oli Hammond	7	0	1+2	0	0+1	0	0+0	0	2+1	0
30	MF	(Wales) WAL	Thomas Hill	7	1	2+1	0	0+0	0	0+1	0	2+1	1
33	DF	(England) ENG	Isaac Anderson	1	0	0+0	0	0+0	0	0+0	0	0+1	0

== Awards ==
=== Player Awards ===
==== EFL League Two Goal of the Month ====
Month	Player	Opposition	Result	Ref.
August	(England) Keenan Appiah-Forson	v. Colchester United	Nominated	
