= Favour Fawunmi =

English footballer (born 2006)

Personal information
- Full name: Favour Daniel Ayobamide Fawunmi
- Date of birth: 26 April 2006 (age 20)
- Place of birth: Newham, England
- Position: Winger

Team information
- Current team: Oldham Athletic (on loan from Stoke City)
- Number: 17

Youth career
- 2017–2020: Barnet
- 2020–2025: West Ham United

Senior career*
| Years | Team | Apps | (Gls) |
| 2025– | Stoke City | 2 | (0) |
| 2026 | → Leyton Orient (loan) | 7 | (0) |
| 2026– | → Oldham Athletic (loan) | 8 | (1) |
- * Club domestic league appearances and goals as of 17:58, 3 October 2026 (UTC)

Favour Daniel Ayobamide Fawunmi (born 26 April 2006) is an English professional footballer who plays as a winger for Oldham Athletic on loan from club Stoke City.

== Career ==
=== West Ham United ===
Fawunmi was in the West Ham United youth academy, having joined at U15 level. He signed scholarship terms ahead of the 2022–23 season, in which he was a member of their FA Youth Cup winning team. He signed a short-term contract upon the conclusion of his scholarship as he recovered from injury, but declined the offer of a new contract during the 2024–25 season and left the club on 31 January 2025.

=== Stoke City ===
Fawunmi joined EFL Championship club Stoke City on 7 February 2025, signing a two-and-a-half year contract, after a brief trial. He was immediately included in the Stoke match-day squad for their FA Cup fourth round tie against Cardiff City on 8 February 2025 and made his debut as a second-half substitute as Stoke lost on penalties following a 3–3 draw. Fawunmi joined League One side Leyton Orient on 2 February 2026, for the remainder of the 2025–26 season. His loan at Leyton Orient was cut short on 2 April 2026, due to a hamstring injury.

On 30 July 2026, Fawunmi joined League Two club Oldham Athletic on a season-long loan deal.

== Personal life ==
He is of Nigerian descent.

== Career statistics ==
As of match played 21 March 2026

Appearances and goals by club, season and competition
| Club | Season | League | | | FA Cup | | League Cup | | Other | | Total | |
| Club | Season | Division | Apps | Goals | Apps | Goals | Apps | Goals | Apps | Goals | Apps | Goals |
|---|---|---|---|---|---|---|---|---|---|---|---|---|
| West Ham United U21 | 2024–25 | — | — | | — | | — | | 2 (Note: Appearances in EFL Trophy) | 0 | 2 | 0 |
| Stoke City | 2024–25 | Championship | 0 | 0 | 1 | 0 | 0 | 0 | — | | 1 | 0 |
| Stoke City | 2025–26 | Championship | 2 | 0 | 0 | 0 | 2 | 0 | — | | 4 | 0 |
| Stoke City | 2026–27 | Championship | 0 | 0 | 0 | 0 | 0 | 0 | — | | 0 | 0 |
| Stoke City | Total | | 2 | 0 | 1 | 0 | 2 | 0 | 0 | 0 | 5 | 0 |
| Leyton Orient (loan) | 2025–26 | League One | 7 | 0 | 0 | 0 | 0 | 0 | 0 | 0 | 7 | 0 |
| Oldham Athletic (loan) | 2026–27 | League Two | 0 | 0 | 0 | 0 | 0 | 0 | 0 | 0 | 0 | 0 |
| Career total | | | 9 | 0 | 1 | 0 | 2 | 0 | 2 | 0 | 14 | 0 |
