= Tom Pett =

English footballer (born 1991)

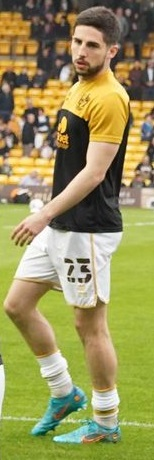
- Pett warming up at Vale Park in May 2022

Personal information
- Full name: Thomas George Pett
- Date of birth: 3 December 1991 (age 34)
- Place of birth: Potters Bar, England
- Height: 5 ft 8 in (1.73 m)
- Position: Midfielder

Team information
- Current team: Oldham Athletic
- Number: 4

Youth career
- 2000–2003: Boreham Wood
- 2003–2009: Potters Bar Town

Senior career*
Years	Team	Apps	(Gls)
2009–2012	Potters Bar Town		
2012–2014	Wealdstone	100	(26)
2014–2018	Stevenage	141	(20)
2018–2020	Lincoln City	55	(4)
2020–2021	Stevenage	31	(2)
2021–2023	Port Vale	69	(3)
2023–2025	Cheltenham Town	48	(0)
2025	→ Oldham Athletic (loan)	21	(0)
2025–	Oldham Athletic	40	(3)

International career
2013	England C	1	(0)
- * Club domestic league appearances and goals as of 17:38, 5 May 2026 (UTC)

Thomas George Pett (born 3 December 1991) is an English professional footballer who plays as a midfielder for EFL League Two club Oldham Athletic.

Pett began his senior career at hometown club Potters Bar Town, establishing himself in the first team during the 2009–10 season after progressing through the youth system. He signed for Wealdstone in January 2012 and was part of the team that won the Isthmian Premier Division in the 2013–14 season. In June 2014, Pett joined Stevenage, making 159 appearances across three and a half years before moving to fellow League Two club Lincoln City in January 2018. He helped Lincoln win the League Two title in the 2018–19 season and departed the club in May 2020.

After returning to Stevenage in November 2020, Pett signed for Port Vale in July 2021. He was a regular in the team that won promotion to League One via the play-offs in 2022. Pett left Port Vale in June 2023 and signed for Cheltenham Town five months later. He joined Oldham Athletic on loan in January 2025, making the move permanent in June 2025 after the club won the 2025 National League play-offs. He has also been capped at England C level.

== Career ==
=== Non-League football ===
Pett began his career at Boreham Wood under the club's PASE youth system, spending two months at academy level before moving to play in the youth system of his hometown club, Potters Bar Town. He broke into the first team and established himself as a regular in the starting line-up at Potters Bar during the 2009–10 season, later captaining the team. He was described as "one of the standout performers" over the subsequent two seasons.

Pett was offered the opportunity to join Wealdstone, who played a division above Potters Bar in the Isthmian League Premier Division, midway through the 2011–12 season. He accepted the offer and signed a permanent deal on 25 January 2012. During his final season with the club, Pett scored 18 times as Wealdstone won the Isthmian Premier Division title, crediting experienced teammates Glen Little and Scott McGleish for their influence. He spent two and a half seasons at the club, scoring 29 goals in 123 appearances in all competitions. Manager Gordon Bartlett stated: "I can honestly say I always knew he would go on to play full-time football and I know he can make it in the professional game". Whilst playing for Wealdstone, Pett represented the England C team and was training to become a PE teacher.

=== Stevenage ===
Having spent time on trial with League Two club Stevenage, Pett joined the club for an undisclosed fee on an initial one-year contract on 23 June 2014. He made his debut on the opening day of the 2014–15 season, playing 88 minutes in a 1–0 home victory against Hartlepool United on 9 August 2014. Pett scored his first goal for the club on 6 September 2014, briefly levelling the score in an eventual 3–2 defeat to York City. He started the new year with two goals in three games, taking his goal tally for the season to four. This included a long-range 30 yards (27 m) strike to double Stevenage's lead in a 2–0 away victory at York City on 17 January 2015. Pett scored with a "blistering strike" in a 1–0 home victory over Portsmouth on 14 April 2015, strengthening Stevenage's position in the League Two play-off places. The club went on to face Southend United in the play-off semi-finals, with Pett scoring in the second leg; however, Stevenage were defeated 4–2 on aggregate. He finished his first season in professional football with eight goals in 38 appearances in all competitions.

Pett signed a new two-year contract with the club on 13 July 2015. During the 2015–16 season, he was a first-team regular, deployed in a deeper midfield role under new manager Teddy Sheringham as Stevenage finished the season in 18th place in League Two. Pett made 43 appearances during the season, scoring once. He remained at Stevenage the following season under newly appointed permanent manager Darren Sarll. He made his first appearance of the season as a second-half substitute in Stevenage's 2–1 home win over Luton Town on 20 August 2016, coming on with the team trailing and assisting the winning goal. Thereafter, he was a regular starter in the team, scoring his first goal of the season in the club's 6–1 victory against Hartlepool United on 3 September 2016. He made his 100th appearance for Stevenage in a 2–0 defeat to Blackpool on 10 December 2016. Pett made 44 appearances during the season, scoring six goals. Shortly after the season had concluded, Stevenage announced that Pett had been placed on the transfer list after the two parties failed to reach an agreement over a contract extension, with his existing deal set to expire in the summer of 2018.

Despite being transfer-listed, Pett remained at Stevenage for the start of the 2017–18 season, scoring the club's first goal of the season when he capitalised on a defensive mistake in a 3–3 draw with Newport County on 5 August 2017. Pett scored seven times in 34 appearances during the first half of the season, including his first brace for Stevenage in a 4–1 win against Cheltenham Town on 1 January 2018. During his three and a half years with Stevenage, Pett made 159 appearances and scored 22 goals.

=== Lincoln City ===
In January 2018, Pett informed Stevenage that he was going to be leaving the club when his contract expired later in June that year, which meant he would have departed on a free transfer. Stevenage received a "significant five-figure" bid from fellow League Two club Lincoln City later that month, which was accepted. Pett agreed personal terms and subsequently signed for Lincoln on a 2 1/2-year deal on 31 January 2018. He made his Lincoln debut as a 61st-minute substitute in a 2–2 draw with Swindon Town at Sincil Bank on 3 February 2018, and scored his first goal in a 1–1 home draw with Yeovil Town on the final day of the regular season. Pett's goal, a 20 yards (18 m) equaliser late in the second half, helped Lincoln earn the point they needed to secure their place in the League Two play-offs. Lincoln ultimately lost to Exeter City in the semi-finals, with Pett coming on as a substitute in both matches. He made 11 appearances for Lincoln during the second half of the 2017–18 season, scoring once.

Pett scored his first goal of the 2018–19 season in a 2–1 away victory at Macclesfield Town on 15 September 2018. He was named Professional Footballers' Association (PFA) Fans' Player of the Month for September 2018. He made 51 appearances during his first full season at Lincoln, scoring four times as they finished the season as League Two champions. Ahead of the 2019–20 season, Pett suffered back problems and was later ruled out for up to six weeks with a medial collateral ligament tear in his knee. During this time, he was studying mental health with Middlesex University and writing a dissertation. By the time he regained fitness, manager Danny Cowley, who had brought Pett to the club, had departed and was replaced by Michael Appleton, who informed Pett that he would not play in any further League One matches, although he would continue to train with the first team. His departure from the club was confirmed on 28 May 2020.

=== Return to Stevenage ===
Without a club at the start of the season, Pett rejoined League Two club Stevenage on 3 November 2020, signing a contract until the end of the 2020–21 season. He made his first appearance since returning in the club's FA Cup first round match against Concord Rangers on 7 November 2020, providing an assist for the opening goal in an eventual penalty shoot-out victory. He scored his first goal since rejoining Stevenage in a 2–1 defeat to Bolton Wanderers on 21 November 2020. Pett made 34 appearances over the course of the season, scoring twice. Stevenage chairman Phil Wallace described Pett as "outstanding" during his second spell at the club, with Stevenage improving from last place to 14th position in the League Two standings during his time there.

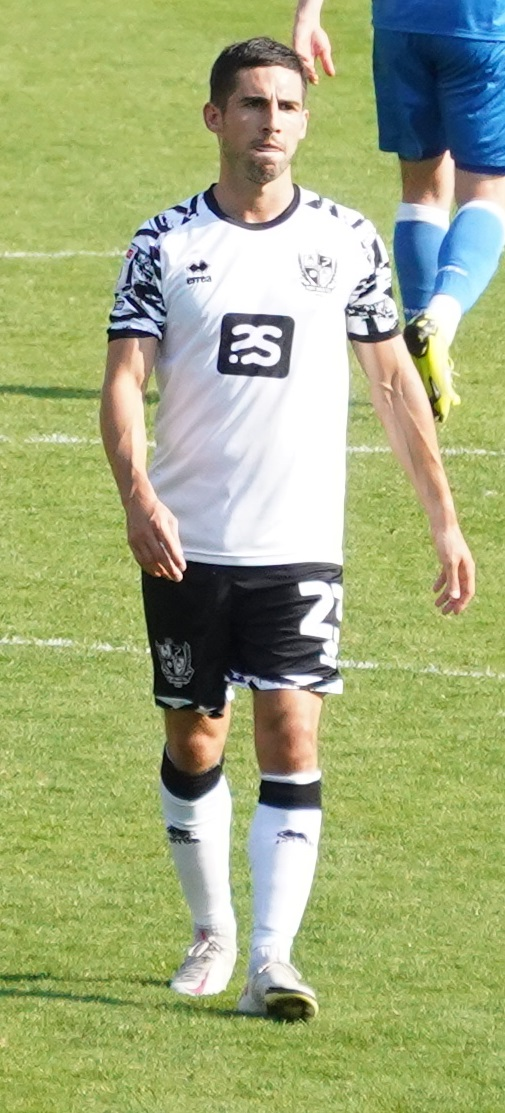
Pett playing for Port Vale (August 2022)

=== Port Vale ===
Pett was offered a new contract by Stevenage, which he declined after informing the club that he would be relocating further north. He subsequently signed a two-year contract with fellow League Two club Port Vale on 29 June 2021. With Brad Walker out injured, Pett established himself in a midfield holding role at the start of the 2021–22 season, directing central midfield teammates Tom Conlon and Ben Garrity to carry out the running work. He captained the team after Conlon was ruled out for the second half of the season due to injury. Pett suffered a grade three hamstring tear on 2 April 2022 and was initially expected to be sidelined for up to twelve weeks; he credited the medical department after recovering within four weeks. He started in the play-off final at Wembley Stadium as Port Vale secured promotion with a 3–0 victory over Mansfield Town; Michael Baggaley of The Sentinel wrote that "[Pett was] calm, composed and classy in the midfield to help his side control the game".

Pett underwent an operation to fix a persistent spinal disc herniation in his back during the 2022–23 pre-season and had to regain his fitness during the early part of the campaign, whilst new signing Funso Ojo was performing consistently in midfield along with Conlon, Walker and Garrity. He managed to re-establish himself in the starting eleven, and earned back-to-back Player of the Match awards at Vale Park in March 2023. He also served as club captain whilst Conlon was out injured. David Flitcroft, the club's director of football, later confirmed that Pett's contract would not be renewed beyond June 2023.

=== Cheltenham Town ===
Following his release from Port Vale, Pett signed an initial short-term contract with Cheltenham Town on 2 November 2023, on an agreement until January 2024. The move reunited him with former Port Vale manager Darrell Clarke, whom he said he would "run through brick walls for". He quickly established himself in a deep-lying midfield role, typically playing alongside Liam Sercombe and either Curtis Thompson or Elliot Bonds. He signed a contract extension on 2 January 2024, keeping him at the club until the end of the season. He was listed as "under contract" on the retained list published following the conclusion of the 2023–24 season.

He was limited to five League Two starts in the first half of the 2024–25 season due to the performances of Liam Kinsella and Luke Young. Cheltenham announced on 7 May 2025 that Pett would not be retained upon the expiry of his contract.

=== Oldham Athletic ===
He was linked with a loan move to National League club Oldham Athletic in the January transfer window. The move was confirmed on 20 January 2025, on a deal running until the end of the 2024–25 season. Manager Micky Mellon described him as "the complete midfielder", stating that his arrival addressed injuries to Tom Conlon and Corry Evans, as well as the departure of Sam Clucas. The club's website stated that "his leadership qualities and experience were very evident, making him a clear fans' favourite from the off". He played in the play-off final as Oldham secured promotion back to the English Football League with a 3–2 victory over Southend United. Pett signed a permanent two-year contract with the club on 17 June 2025. Speaking in October, he said he wanted to lead Athletic in a league and FA Cup run. He featured 43 times across the 2025–26 campaign, scoring three goals.

== Style of play ==
Described as a reliable holding midfield player, Pett has cited his strengths as reading the game, regaining possession, and making passes that transition the team from defence to attack.

== Personal life ==
Pett was a talented cricketer in his youth, representing Hertfordshire and Middlesex at age-group level before he decided to focus on football. He supports Arsenal. He has a Twitch channel on which he streams himself playing video games such as Call of Duty, FIFA and Football Manager. His younger brother, Dan, played part-time football for Leverstock Green. He married fellow professional footballer Hannah Blundell at Fanhams Hall on 15 June 2024. On 11 September 2024, Blundell announced that she was pregnant with the couple's first child. Their daughter Romi was born in March 2025.

== Career statistics ==
As of match played 2 May 2026

Appearances and goals by club, season and competition
Club	Season	League			FA Cup		EFL Cup		Other		Total	
Club	Season	Division	Apps	Goals	Apps	Goals	Apps	Goals	Apps	Goals	Apps	Goals
Wealdstone	2011–12	Isthmian League Premier Division	15	1	0	0	—		3 (Note: Appearances in Middlesex Senior Cup)	0	18	1
Wealdstone	2012–13	Isthmian League Premier Division	41	9	2	0	—		9 (Note: Four appearances and one goal in FA Trophy; three appearances in Isthmian League Cup; one appearance in Middlesex Senior Cup; one appearance in Middlesex Senior Charity Cup)	1	52	10
Wealdstone	2013–14	Isthmian League Premier Division	44	16	2	1	—		7 (Note: Three appearances and one goal in FA Trophy; one appearance in Isthmian League Cup; three appearances in Middlesex Senior Cup)	1	53	18
Wealdstone	Total		100	26	4	1	0	0	19	2	123	29
Stevenage	2014–15	League Two	34	7	1	0	1	0	2 (Note: Appearances in 2015 League Two play-offs)	1	38	8
Stevenage	2015–16	League Two	40	1	2	0	1	0	0	0	43	1
Stevenage	2016–17	League Two	40	6	1	0	1	0	2 (Note: Appearance(s) in EFL Trophy)	0	44	6
Stevenage	2017–18	League Two	27	6	4	1	1	0	2	0	34	7
Stevenage	Total		141	20	8	1	4	0	6	1	159	22
Lincoln City	2017–18	League Two	9	1	—		0	0	2 (Note: Appearances in 2018 League Two play-offs)	0	11	1
Lincoln City	2018–19	League Two	44	3	3	1	2	0	2	0	51	4
Lincoln City	2019–20	League One	2	0	0	0	0	0	1	0	3	0
Lincoln City	Total		55	4	3	1	2	0	5	0	65	5
Stevenage	2020–21	League Two	31	2	3	0	0	0	0	0	34	2
Port Vale	2021–22	League Two	39	2	3	0	1	0	4 (Note: One appearance in EFL Trophy; three appearances in the 2022 League Two play-offs)	0	47	2
Port Vale	2022–23	League One	30	1	1	0	1	0	4	0	36	1
Port Vale	Total		69	3	4	0	2	0	8	0	83	3
Cheltenham Town	2023–24	League One	28	0	1	0	0	0	0	0	29	0
Cheltenham Town	2024–25	League Two	20	0	1	0	1	0	5	2	27	2
Cheltenham Town	Total		48	0	2	0	1	0	5	2	56	2
Oldham Athletic (loan)	2024–25	National League	21	0	—		—		3 (Note: Appearances in 2025 National League play-offs)	0	24	0
Oldham Athletic	2025–26	League Two	40	3	2	0	0	0	1	0	43	3
Oldham Athletic	2026–27	League Two	0	0	0	0	0	0	0	0	0	0
Oldham Athletic	Total		61	3	2	0	0	0	4	0	67	3
Career total			505	58	26	3	9	0	47	5	587	66

== Honours ==
Wealdstone

- Isthmian League Premier Division: 2013–14

Lincoln City

- EFL League Two: 2018–19

Port Vale

- EFL League Two play-offs: 2022

Oldham Athletic

- National League play-offs: 2025
