= Josh Lundstram =

English footballer (born 1999)

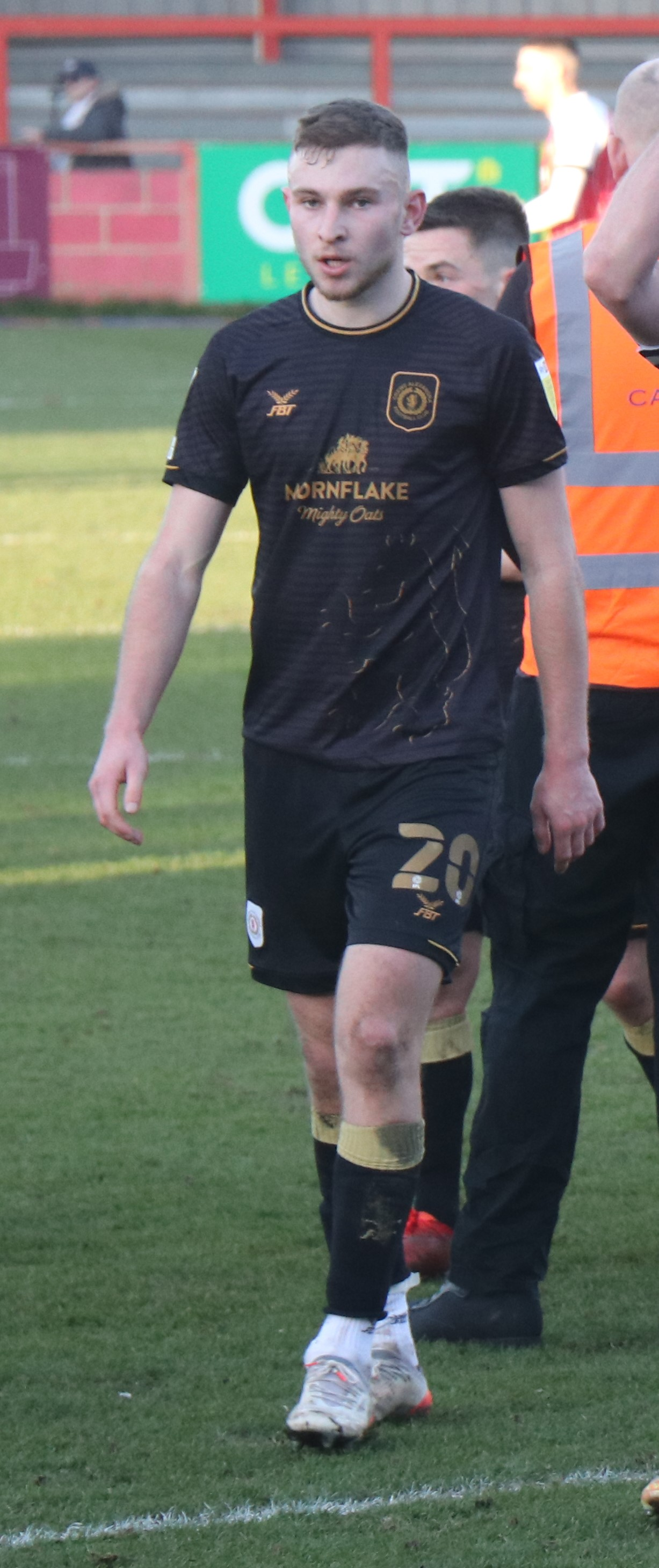
- Lundstram (February 2022)

Personal information
- Full name: Joshua Lundstram
- Date of birth: 19 February 1999 (age 27)
- Place of birth: Stoke-on-Trent, England
- Height: 5 ft 9 in (1.76 m)
- Position: Midfielder

Team information
- Current team: Eastleigh
- Number: 17

Youth career
- –2017: Crewe Alexandra

Senior career*
Years	Team	Apps	(Gls)
2017–2022	Crewe Alexandra	26	(0)
2017	→ Sandbach United (loan)	8	(4)
2018	→ Newcastle Town (loan)		
2018–2019	→ Kidsgrove Athletic (loan)	5	(0)
2019	→ Nuneaton Borough (loan)	15	(0)
2019–2020	→ Kidsgrove Athletic (loan)	8	(0)
2020	→ Altrincham (loan)	10	(0)
2021–2022	→ Solihull Moors (loan)	1	(0)
2022–2023	Altrincham	46	(3)
2023–2025	Oldham Athletic	63	(5)
2025–	Eastleigh	0	(0)

International career^{‡}
2023	England C	1	(0)
- * Club domestic league appearances and goals as of 14 July 2025 ‡ National team caps and goals as of 22:00, 21 March 2023 (UTC)

Joshua Lundstram (born 19 February 1999) is an English professional footballer who plays as a midfielder for National League club Eastleigh.

== Career ==
=== Crewe Alexandra ===
Lundstram graduated from Crewe's academy in summer 2017.

He gained experience in non-League football with loan moves to Sandbach United, Newcastle Town and Nuneaton Borough, the latter for a month in January 2019. He was given a one-year contract, with an optional one-year extension, in May 2019.

In November 2019, Lundstram went on a month's loan to Kidsgrove Athletic before joining Altrincham on a similar deal in January 2020. His loan to Altrincham was firstly extended by a month, then to the end of the season. He was part of the Altrincham side that won the National League North Play-offs that year.

Lundstram made his first-team debut for Crewe in the opening group game of the 2020–21 EFL Trophy away to Bolton Wanderers, playing 80 minutes before being replaced by Oliver Finney. He made his league debut the following Saturday, 12 September 2020, at home to Charlton Athletic, replacing Finney for the final 15 minutes. However, in October 2020 he was sidelined after suffering a stress fracture to his ankle, eventually making a return to light training in February 2021, and returning to first-team action with another substitute appearance in the final match of the season.

On 13 May 2021, Crewe announced that it had offered Lundstram a new contract; he signed a two-year deal in June 2021, and made his first league start for Crewe on 7 August 2021 against Cheltenham Town at Gresty Road, playing the pass that set up Crewe's goal in a 1–1 draw.

On 17 December 2021, Lundstram joined National League side Solihull Moors on a 28-day loan deal until 14 January 2022. He made his debut in Solihull's 1–0 win at AFC Fylde in the fourth round of the FA Trophy on 18 December, and then made one league appearance, against Stockport County on 28 December 2021.

=== Altrincham ===
On 28 May 2022, Crewe announced Lundstram would be joining Altrincham permanently for an undisclosed fee on 1 July 2022.

Lundstram played all of Altrincham's league games in the 2022-2023 season, scoring three times, and was named Player of the Year in all three categories (supporters, players and manager) in the club's end of season awards. He was later also announced as National League Player of the Season at the North West Football Awards in November 2023.

=== Oldham Athletic ===
On 6 June 2023, fellow National League club Oldham Athletic announced Lundstram would be joining them permanently for an undisclosed fee. After incurring a knee injury in a pre-season game, he made his Oldham debut as a 61st minute substitute in a 1–1 draw at Wealdstone on 30 September 2023.

=== Eastleigh ===
On 14 July 2025, Lundstram joined National League side Eastleigh.

== Career statistics ==
As of 28 January 2024

Club	Season	Division	League		FA Cup		EFL Cup		Other		Total	
Club	Season	Division	Apps	Goals	Apps	Goals	Apps	Goals	Apps	Goals	Apps	Goals
Crewe Alexandra	2020–21	League One	4	0	0	0	0	0	2	0	6	0
Crewe Alexandra	2021–22	League One	22	0	1	0	2	0	5	0	30	0
Crewe Alexandra	Crewe Alexandra total		26	0	1	0	2	0	7	0	36	0
Altrincham	2022–23	National League	46	3	0	0	0	0	0	0	46	3
Altrincham	Altrincham total		46	3	0	0	0	0	0	0	46	3
Oldham Athletic	2023–24	National League	17	0	2	0	0	0	1	0	20	0
Oldham Athletic	Oldham Athletic total		17	0	2	0	0	0	1	0	20	0
Total			89	3	3	0	2	0	8	0	102	3
