= Oli Hammond =

Welsh footballer

Personal information
- Full name: Oliver Jack Hammond
- Date of birth: 13 November 2002 (age 23)
- Position: Midfielder

Team information
- Current team: Oldham Athletic
- Number: 27

Youth career
- 2011–: Nottingham Forest

Senior career*
Years	Team	Apps	(Gls)
2021–2024	Nottingham Forest	0	(0)
2023–2024	→ Cheltenham Town (loan)	9	(0)
2024–	Oldham Athletic	39	(0)

International career^{‡}
2021–	Wales U21	13	(2)
- * Club domestic league appearances and goals as of 15:51, 27 April 2026 (UTC) ‡ National team caps and goals as of 12:38, 15 October 2024 (UTC)

Oliver Jack Hammond (born 13 November 2002) is a professional footballer who plays as a midfielder for EFL League Two club Oldham Athletic. He is a Wales under-21 international.

== Club career ==
=== Nottingham Forest ===
Hammond joined the Nottingham Forest academy at the age of eight-years old. He went on to progress through age groups at the academy, eventually earning his first professional contract with the club on 30 March 2021. He made his professional debut for Forest on 24 August 2021, starting in an EFL Cup fixture against Wolverhampton Wanderers. On 20 July 2023, Hammond signed a new one-year deal with Forest.

On 1 August 2023, Hammond signed for League One club Cheltenham Town on a loan deal, returning to Forest on 2 January 2024.

=== Oldham Athletic ===
On 19 January 2024, Hammond signed an 18-month deal with National League side Oldham Athletic for an undisclosed fee.

== International career ==
Hammond qualifies to play for Wales internationally through his mother. He was called up to the Wales under-21 squad on 4 October 2021.

== Career statistics ==
=== Club ===
As of match played 30 August 2025

Appearances and goals by club, season and competition
Club	Season	League			FA Cup		EFL Cup		Other		Total	
Club	Season	Division	Apps	Goals	Apps	Goals	Apps	Goals	Apps	Goals	Apps	Goals
Nottingham Forest	2021-22	Championship	0	0	0	0	1	0	—		1	0
Nottingham Forest	2022-23	Premier League	0	0	0	0	2	0	—		2	0
Nottingham Forest	2023-24	Premier League	0	0	0	0	0	0	—		0	0
Nottingham Forest	Total		0	0	0	0	3	0	—		3	0
Cheltenham Town (loan)	2023-24	League One	9	0	0	0	1	0	1 (Note: Appearance(s) in EFL Trophy)	0	11	0
Oldham Athletic	2023-24	National League	11	0	0	0	—		0	0	11	0
Oldham Athletic	2024-25	National League	8	0	1	0	—		0	0	9	0
Oldham Athletic	2025-26	League Two	3	0	0	0	1	0	1	0	5	0
Oldham Athletic	Total		22	0	1	0	1	0	1	0	25	0
Career total			31	0	1	0	5	0	2	0	39	0
