= Kai Payne =

English footballer (born 2004)

Personal information
- Full name: Kai Anthony Payne
- Date of birth: 26 November 2004 (age 21)
- Height: 1.88 m (6 ft 2 in)
- Position: Attacking midfielder

Team information
- Current team: Oldham Athletic (on loan from Wigan Athletic)
- Number: 26

Youth career
- 2013–2017: Liverpool
- 2018–2023: Wigan Athletic

Senior career*
Years	Team	Apps	(Gls)
2023–	Wigan Athletic	1	(0)
2023	→ Mossley (loan)	9	(2)
2024	→ Oldham Athletic (loan)	4	(0)
2025–	→ Oldham Athletic (loan)	34	(2)
- * Club domestic league appearances and goals as of 21:24, 4 October 2026 (UTC)

Kai Payne (born 26 November 2004) is an English professional footballer who plays as an attacking midfielder for EFL League Two club Oldham Athletic, on loan from EFL League One club Wigan Athletic.

== Career ==
Payne was a highly sought-after player at under-9 level and was in the Academy at Liverpool until the age of 13. He joined the academy at Wigan Athletic following a trial game in November 2018. He turned professional at Wigan in November 2022 early into the second year of his scholarship. On 2 March 2023, he joined Northern Premier League Division One West club Mossley on loan.

He made his debut for Wigan in November 2023 in an EFL Trophy game against Tranmere Rovers. He made his first league appearance in August 2024 against Crawley Town, and signed a new three-year contract with the club a few days later.

On 14 October 2024, Payne joined National League club Oldham Athletic on loan until 11 November.

On 8 July 2025, Payne returned to Oldham Athletic on a season-long loan following their promotion to League Two. On 4 August 2026, he returned to the club for another season-long loan deal.

== Style of play ==
Payne is a combative midfielder with excellent technique.

== Career statistics ==
As of match played 22 September 2026

Appearances and goals by club, season and competition
Club	Season	League			FA Cup		League Cup		Other		Total	
Club	Season	Division	Apps	Goals	Apps	Goals	Apps	Goals	Apps	Goals	Apps	Goals
Wigan Athletic	2022–23	EFL Championship	0	0	0	0	0	0	0	0	0	0
Wigan Athletic	2023–24	EFL League One	0	0	0	0	0	0	1 (Note: Appearances in the EFL Trophy)	0	1	0
Wigan Athletic	2024–25	League One	2	0	0	0	0	0	4	0	6	0
Wigan Athletic	Total		2	0	0	0	0	0	5	0	7	0
Mossley (loan)	2023–24	Northern Premier League; Division One West	9	2	—		—		—		9	2
Oldham Athletic (loan)	2024–25	National League	4	0	1	0	—		—		5	0
Oldham Athletic (loan)	2025–26	League Two	32	2	2	0	0	0	1	0	35	2
Oldham Athletic (loan)	2026–27	League Two	2	0	0	0	1	0	1	0	4	0
Oldham Athletic (loan)	Total		34	2	2	0	1	0	2	0	39	2
Career total			49	4	3	0	1	0	7	0	60	4
