= Mike Fondop =

Cameroonian footballer (born 1993)

Personal information
- Full name: Karl Mike Fondop Talom
- Date of birth: 27 November 1993 (age 32)
- Place of birth: Yaoundé, Cameroon
- Height: 1.90 m (6 ft 3 in)
- Position: Striker

Team information
- Current team: Oldham Athletic
- Number: 9

Senior career*
Years	Team	Apps	(Gls)
2014–2015	Stanway Rovers	29	(10)
2015–2016	Billericay Town	24	(10)
2016–2017	Oxford City	23	(7)
2017–2018	Guiseley	19	(3)
2018	→ FC Halifax Town (loan)	12	(4)
2018–2019	Wrexham	21	(5)
2019	→ Maidenhead United (loan)	11	(1)
2019–2020	Chesterfield	29	(10)
2020–2021	Aldershot Town	4	(0)
2021	Burton Albion	17	(2)
2021–2022	Hartlepool United	8	(0)
2022–	Oldham Athletic	170	(49)
- * Club domestic league appearances and goals as of 14:23, 22 November 2026 (UTC)

Karl Mike Fondop Talom (born 27 November 1993) is a Cameroonian professional footballer who plays as a forward for EFL League Two club Oldham Athletic.

== Early and personal life ==
Fondop moved from Cameroon to England in 2013, to study for a degree in actuarial sciences at the University of Essex, graduating with a first-class degree in 2017.

== Career ==
Fondop began his career with Eastern Counties League side Stanway Rovers, having played on trial at Whitehawk in July 2014. The following season, he went on trial with the under-21 team at Billericay Town before being given a chance in the first team, where he scored eight goals in his first six games. Fondop left Billericay in May 2016 having agreed on a deal to join Margate, for which he was criticised by manager Craig Edwards as he left the club the day before a cup final. The move fell through after Margate declined to pay compensation to Billericay. Fondop joined Oxford City for the 2016–17 season. After a trial with Cheltenham Town the following summer, he joined Guiseley for the 2017–18 season. He joined FC Halifax Town on loan in February 2018, and scored four goals in twelve games to help the Shaymen avoid relegation. In July 2018, he joined Wrexham on a two-year deal. Fondop was labelled a "cult hero" after five goals in his first nine games, but he did not add to that tally in the league and was allowed to join Maidenhead United on loan in February 2019. In August, he left the Welsh club by mutual consent and signed for Chesterfield. Fondop finished the curtailed 2019–20 season as the Spireites' top scorer with eleven goals in all competitions, but left the club at the end of the season to "keep his options open" according to manager John Pemberton, before joining Aldershot Town in November 2020 on a short-term deal.

After this deal expired, he signed for Burton Albion in February 2021 on a contract until the end of the season. He made his English Football League debut on 20 February as a substitute in a 0–3 defeat at home to Sunderland. In his second Burton appearance and his first start, he scored his first goal for them in a 2-1 win at Charlton Athletic on 23 February 2021. On 12 May 2021 it was announced that he would be one of 12 players leaving Burton at the end of the season.

Fondop signed for Hartlepool United on 16 September 2021. He left at the end of his contract on 17 January 2022, and signed for Oldham Athletic on 31 January.

== Career statistics ==
As of match played 21 November 2026

Appearances and goals by club, season and competition
Club	Season	League			FA Cup		EFL Cup		Other		Total	
Club	Season	Division	Apps	Goals	Apps	Goals	Apps	Goals	Apps	Goals	Apps	Goals
Stanway Rovers	2014–15	ECFL Premier Division	29	10	0	0	–		3	2	32	12
Billericay Town	2015–16	Isthmian League Premier Division	24	10	0	0	–		0	0	24	10
Oxford City	2016–17	National League South	23	7	2	2	–		2 (Note: One appearance in FA Trophy, one appearances in Oxfordshire Senior Cup)	0	27	9
Guiseley	2017–18	National League	19	3	4	2	–		1 (Note: Appearances in the FA Trophy)	0	24	5
FC Halifax Town (loan)	2017–18	National League	12	4	0	0	–		0	0	12	4
Wrexham	2018–19	National League	21	5	4	0	–		1	1	26	6
Maidenhead United (loan)	2018–19	National League	11	1	0	0	–		0	0	11	1
Chesterfield	2019–20	National League	29	10	1	1	–		1	0	31	11
Aldershot Town	2020–21	National League	4	0	0	0	–		1	1	5	1
Burton Albion	2020–21	League One	17	2	0	0	0	0	0	0	17	2
Hartlepool United	2021–22	League Two	8	0	2	0	0	0	3	0	13	0
Oldham Athletic	2021–22	League Two	2	2	0	0	0	0	0	0	2	2
Oldham Athletic	2022–23	National League	35	11	3	2	–		2	0	40	13
Oldham Athletic	2023–24	National League	31	9	1	0	–		1	1	33	10
Oldham Athletic	2024–25	National League	45	17	3	2	–		3 (Note: Appearances in the play-offs)	1	51	20
Oldham Athletic	2025–26	League Two	41	8	2	0	1	0	2 (Note: Appearance in the EFL Trophy)	0	46	8
Oldham Athletic	2026–27	League Two	16	2	1	0	1	0	2	0	20	2
Oldham Athletic	Total		170	49	10	4	2	0	10	2	192	55
Career total			367	101	23	9	2	0	22	6	414	116

== Honours ==
Oldham Athletic

- National League play-offs: 2025

Individual

- Oldham Athletic Supporters' Player of the Year: 2024–25
- Oldham Athletic Players' Player of the Year: 2024–25
