= Gus Scott-Morriss =

English professional footballer (born 1997)

Personal information
- Full name: Gus Henry Roy Scott
- Date of birth: 8 May 1997 (age 29)
- Place of birth: Leyton, England
- Position: Right wing back

Team information
- Current team: Oldham Athletic
- Number: 2

Youth career
- Royston Town

Senior career*
Years	Team	Apps	(Gls)
2014–2021	Royston Town	163	(5)
2021–2022	Hemel Hempstead Town	50	(5)
2022–2026	Southend United	162	(45)
2026–	Oldham Athletic	12	(0)

International career
2023–2024	England C	2	(0)
- * Club domestic league appearances and goals as of 08:48, 16 November 2026 (UTC)

Gus Henry Roy Scott-Morriss (born 8 May 1997) is an English professional footballer who plays as a right wingback for EFL League Two club Oldham Athletic.

== Career ==
=== Royston Town ===
Scott-Morriss played for Royston Town in the Southern League until 2021.

=== Hemel Hempstead ===
Scott-Morriss then joined National League South side Hemel Hempstead Town and made over 40 appearances for the club up to 2022.

=== Southend United ===
Scott-Morriss was the fourth player to join Southend United under Kevin Maher. His first appearance was against Eastleigh on 27 August 2022. Scott-Morriss played 35 games in his first season, scoring five goals.

On 16 December 2023, during a match against Bromley, Scott-Morriss took over as goalkeeper after the Blues' goalkeeper was injured and Southend had no substitute goalkeepers available. He was said to have made a key save during the match but the team lost 2–1. At the end of the 2023–2024 season, Scott-Morris was named in the Vanarama National League Team of the Season, was voted Southend player of the season, and signed a new two-year contract with the club.

On 14 April 2026, Scott-Morris scored the opening goal in Southend's 2–0 win at Aldershot Town, a win that ensured the Blues qualified for the National League play-offs. By this date he had scored 46 goals for the club since joining from Hemel Hempstead in 2022 and said: "Let's see if I can get to 50 [this season]." Four days later, after his car broke down, Scott-Morris hitched a ride on Bedford Town's bus to reach Southend's game at FC Halifax Town, and scored his 17th goal of the season in the Blues' 6–2 win at The Shay.

=== Oldham Athletic ===
On 28 May 2026, Scott-Morriss agreed to join League Two club Oldham Athletic on an initial two-year deal, with the option for a further year.

== International career ==
Scott-Morriss was selected for the England C squad following his performances at Southend United. He earned his first cap on 21 March 2023 in a 1–0 friendly victory over Wales C at Moss Lane, home of Altrincham, the squad having trained at Manchester United's academy facilities in the build-up. Scott-Morriss described the experience as the highlight of his career to that point.

== Career statistics ==
As of match played 14 November 2026

Appearances and goals by club, season and competition
Club	Season	League			FA Cup		EFL Cup		Other		Total	
Club	Season	Division	Apps	Goals	Apps	Goals	Apps	Goals	Apps	Goals	Apps	Goals
Royston Town	2014–15	Southern League Division One Central	8	0	0	0	—		0	0	8	0
Royston Town	2015–16	Southern League Division One Central	23	1	2	0	—		5 (Note: Two appearances in FA Trophy, one appearance in Southern League Cup, one appearance in Herts Senior Cup, one appearance in Herts Charity Cup)	0	30	1
Royston Town	2016–17	Southern League Division One Central	31	1	1	0	—		10 (Note: Six appearances in FA Trophy, two appearances in Southern League Cup, one appearance in Herts Senior Cup, one appearance in Southern League Division One Championship match)	0	42	1
Royston Town	2017–18	Southern League Premier Division	34	0	3	0	—		10 (Note: Four appearances in FA Trophy, two appearances and one goal in Southern League Cup, three appearances in Herts Senior Cup, one appearance in Herts Charity Cup)	1	47	1
Royston Town	2018–19	Southern League Premier Division Central	33	1	0	0	—		8 (Note: Three appearances in FA Trophy, three appearances in Southern League Cup, one appearance in Herts Senior Cup, one appearance in Herts Charity Cup)	0	41	1
Royston Town	2019–20	Southern League Premier Division Central	28	2	3	0	—		9 (Note: Seven appearances in FA Trophy, two appearances in Herts Senior Cup)	0	40	2
Royston Town	2020–21	Southern League Premier Division Central	6	0	3	0	—		2 (Note: Appearance(s) in FA Trophy)	0	11	0
Royston Town	Total		163	5	12	0	—		44	1	219	6
Hemel Hempstead Town	2020–21	National League South	12	0	—		—		—		12	0
Hemel Hempstead Town	2021–22	National League South	38	5	2	1	—		3 (Note: One appearance in FA Trophy, two appearances and one goal in Herts Senior Cup)	1	43	7
Hemel Hempstead Town	Total		50	5	2	1	—		3	1	55	7
Southend United	2022–23	National League	35	5	1	0	—		1	0	37	5
Southend United	2023–24	National League	42	8	1	0	—		1	0	44	8
Southend United	2024–25	National League	44	17	2	0	—		4 (Note: One appearance in FA Trophy, three appearances in National League play-offs)	0	50	17
Southend United	2025–26	National League	40	15	1	0	–		2	2	43	17
Southend United	Total		161	45	5	0	—		8	2	174	47
Oldham Athletic	2026–27	League Two	12	0	1	0	1	0	1 (Note: Appearances in Football League Trophy)	0	15	0
Career total			384	55	20	1	1	0	56	4	460	60

== Honours ==
Southend United

- FA Trophy: 2025–26

Individual

- National League Team of the Season: 2023–24, 2025–26
- Southend United Player of the Year: 2023–24, 2024–25
