= Leon Chambers-Parillon =

English footballer

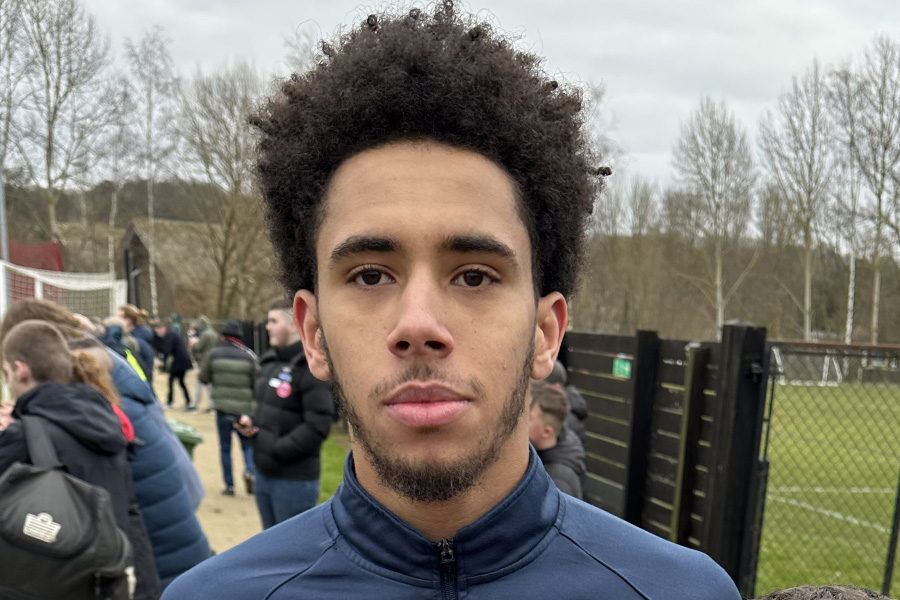
- Chambers-Parillon with Kings Langley in February 2023

Personal information
- Full name: Leon Nelson Chambers-Parillon
- Date of birth: 5 November 2001 (age 25)
- Place of birth: Luton, England
- Height: 1.73 m (5 ft 8 in)
- Positions: Central midfielder; attacking midfielder; left winger

Team information
- Current team: Southend United
- Number: 19

Youth career
- Luton Town
- Aston Villa
- 2018–2020: Oxford United

Senior career*
Years	Team	Apps	(Gls)
2020–2022	Oxford United	3	(0)
2020	→ AFC Rushden & Diamonds (loan)	2	(0)
2020	→ Biggleswade Town (loan)	6	(1)
2020–2021	→ Havant & Waterlooville (loan)	4	(0)
2021	→ Gloucester City (loan)	5	(1)
2021–2022	→ Havant & Waterlooville (loan)	3	(0)
2022	→ Slough Town (loan)	1	(0)
2022	Hitchin Town	4	(0)
2023	Kings Langley	15	(1)
2023–2025	Slough Town	62	(8)
2023	→ Beaconsfield Town (loan)	1	(0)
2025–	Southend United	62	(10)
- * Club domestic league appearances and goals as of 2 November 2026 (UTC)

Leon Nelson Chambers-Parillon (born 5 November 2001) is an English footballer who plays for National League side Southend United, where he plays as a central midfielder, attacking midfielder or left winger.

== Career ==
Chambers-Parillon played youth football for Luton Town and Aston Villa, before joining Oxford United on a two-year scholarship in 2018.

He joined AFC Rushden & Diamonds on a one-month work experience loan on 14 February 2020. He appeared twice for them.

His scholarship was extended by a further year in summer 2020.

He joined Southern League Premier Division Central side Biggleswade Town on loan on 28 September 2020. He made six appearances, scoring once.

He made his professional debut for Oxford United on 10 November 2020 as a late substitute in a 1–0 EFL Trophy victory over Walsall; he provided the assist for the only goal of the game, with a pass forward to Derick Osei after 87 minutes.

He joined National League South side Havant & Waterlooville on a one-month work experience loan in December 2020. He returned from his loan in February 2021 following the premature cancellation of the National League South season, having made 4 league appearances.

He made his league debut for Oxford United as a substitute in a 0–0 draw at home to Charlton Athletic on 6 March 2021.

On 1 October 2021, he was loaned to National League North side Gloucester City for one month. On 3 November 2021, he rejoined Havant & Waterlooville on a one-month loan deal. In December 2021, his second loan spell at Havant & Waterlooville was extended by a further month. On 23 March 2022, he joined National League South side Slough Town on loan for the remainder of the 2021–22 season.

Chambers-Parillon was released by Oxford at the end of the 2021–22 season. On 19 August 2022, He signed for Southern League Premier Division Central side Hitchin Town.

On 23 July 2023, Chambers-Parillon returned to National League South side Slough Town on a permanent deal.

On 29 January 2025, he signed for Southend United for an undisclosed fee on a 2.5 year contract.

== Honours ==
Southend United

- FA Trophy: 2025–26
