= Jesurun Uchegbulam =

Nigerian footballer (born 2001)

Personal information
- Full name: Jesurun First Lin Ezeugo Uchegbulam
- Date of birth: 1 January 2001 (age 25)
- Place of birth: Lagos, Nigeria
- Position: Winger

Team information
- Current team: Bury

Youth career
- 2008–2016: AC Milan

Senior career*
Years	Team	Apps	(Gls)
2017–2018	Stockport Town		(8)
2018–2021	Mossley	32	(4)
2021–2022	Matlock Town	32	(7)
2022–2023	Chesterfield	34	(2)
2023–2024	Rochdale	30	(1)
2024–2025	Oldham Athletic	27	(1)
2025	→ Eastleigh (loan)	7	(0)
2025	Eastbourne Borough	13	(0)
2025–2026	Chelmsford City	16	(1)
2026	→ Buxton (loan)	5	(1)
2026	The New Saints	0	(0)
2026	Matlock Town	0	(0)
2026–	Bury	5	(0)
- * Club domestic league appearances and goals as of 22:30, 20 September 2026 (UTC)

Jesurun First Lin Ezeugo Uchegbulam (born 1 January 2001) is a Nigerian professional footballer who plays as a winger for Northern Premier League Premier Division side Bury.

== Early life ==
Uchegbulam was born in Lagos, Nigeria and moved to Italy as a young child. After his parents lost their jobs the family moved to England, when he was 15, settling in Harpurhey.

== Career ==
=== Early career ===
Uchegbulam joined the youth team of AC Milan at the age of seven. After his family moved to England, he had a trial with Everton, but he was not signed by the club after he had heart surgery. He also had trials with Sheffield Wednesday, Wigan Athletic, Brentford and Salford City.

He then spent time in non-league football with Stockport Town, scoring eight goals in his debut season for the club, and Mossley, for whom he was named the fans' young player of the year in June 2020, having scored four goals in 32 league appearances for the club. He joined Matlock Town in May 2021, scoring nine goals in 38 appearances for the Northern Premier League Premier Division club.

=== Chesterfield ===
In July 2022, Uchegbulam signed his first professional contract with Chesterfield. By September 2022 he was appearing for the club primarily as a substitute, and he scored his first goal for the club that month.

=== Rochdale ===
On 11 August 2023, Uchegbulam signed for Rochdale for a nominal undisclosed fee.

=== Oldham Athletic ===
On 3 July 2024, Uchegbulam signed for Oldham Athletic, and scored on his Oldham debut, against Braintree Town. He signed on loan for Eastleigh in January 2025, being recalled by Oldham in March. He featured for Oldham in the National League playoff final at Wembley, as the club won promotion to the Football League.

=== Later career ===
On 22 July 2025, Uchegbulam signed for National League South club Eastbourne Borough.

On 1 November 2025, he signed for Chelmsford City. On the same day he signed for Chelmsford, Uchegbulam scored and assisted on his debut, in a 4–1 win against Braintree Town in the first round of the FA Cup. On 21 March 2026, Uchegbulam joined National League North side Buxton on loan. On 15 May 2026, Chelmsford announced Uchegbulam had departed the club.

It was announced that he would join Cymru Premier team The New Saints in June 2026.

On 14 July 2026, Uchegbulam signed for former club Matlock Town, leaving The New Saints without playing for the club.

On 30 July 2026, he joined Bury after spending just over two weeks back at Matlock.

== Honours ==
Oldham Athletic

- National League play-offs: 2025
