= Reagan Ogle =

Australian soccer player (born 1999)

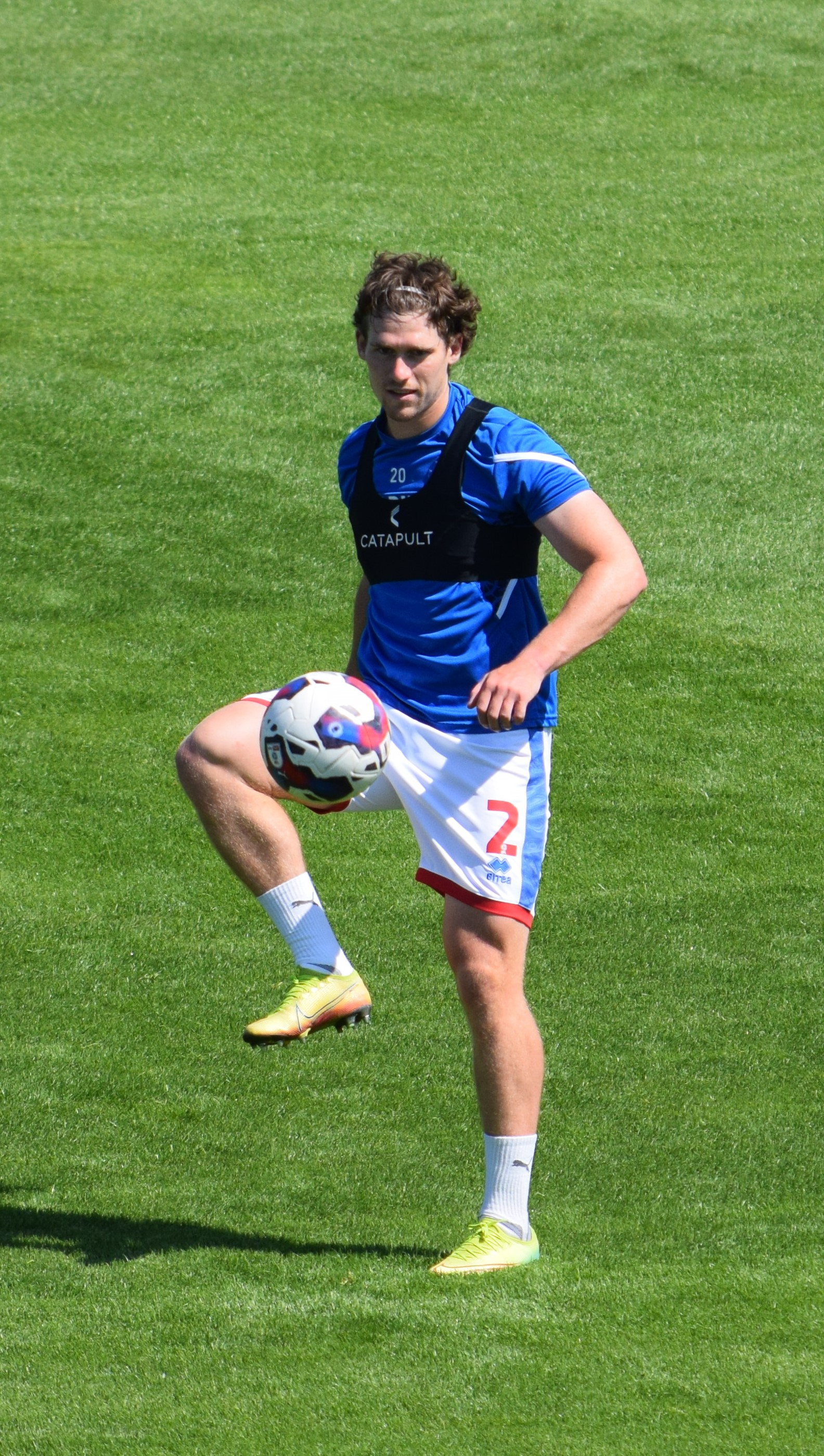
- Ogle warming up for Hartlepool United in 2022

Personal information
- Full name: Reagan Robert William Ogle
- Date of birth: 29 March 1999 (age 27)
- Place of birth: Wollongong, Australia
- Height: 1.73 m (5 ft 8 in)
- Position: Right-back

Team information
- Current team: Scunthorpe United
- Number: 22

Youth career
- 2015–2016: Accrington Stanley

Senior career*
Years	Team	Apps	(Gls)
2016–2021	Accrington Stanley	4	(0)
2017	→ Ramsbottom United (loan)	4	(1)
2018	→ Wealdstone (loan)	2	(0)
2018–2019	→ Southport (loan)	34	(0)
2019–2020	→ Southport (loan)	22	(0)
2020–2021	→ AFC Fylde (loan)	3	(0)
2021	→ Altrincham (loan)	10	(0)
2021–2022	Hartlepool United	18	(0)
2022–2024	Scunthorpe United	76	(1)
2024–2026	Oldham Athletic	50	(2)
2026–	Scunthorpe United	0	(0)
- * Club domestic league appearances and goals as of 23:39, 10 July 2026

Reagan Robert William Ogle (born 29 March 1999) is an Australian professional soccer player who plays as a right-back for National League club Scunthorpe United.

== Career ==
=== Accrington Stanley ===
Ogle started his career in the youth system at Accrington Stanley starting a two-year scholarship in the summer of 2015. In November 2016, he made his professional debut in an EFL Trophy group-stage match against Wolverhampton Wanderers U23. He came on as a substitute for Seamus Conneely in the second half in a 4–0 defeat.

In February 2017, Ogle joined Northern Premier League Division One North side Ramsbottom United on loan. He scored on his debut for the club in a 4–0 win over Ossett Albion.

In March 2017, he joined Premier League side Stoke City on trial.

On 23 August 2018, Ogle joined Southport on an initial one-month loan deal, citing that he was "really looking forward to playing some more competitive first team football". After impressing during five starts, Ogle's loan was extended until the end of the 2018–2019 season, with Ogle saying, "I’m pleased that I've been able to put in some good performances. The fans have been great to me and I'm enjoying my football at Southport. I know this club will help me develop into a much better player." Ogle won the Trust in Yellow player of the month for September 2018. On 20 July 2019, Ogle re-joined Southport on loan until January.

On 19 October 2020, Ogle joined AFC Fylde on loan until January. He played six times in all competitions for the club.

On 1 March 2021, Ogle joined National League side Altrincham on a one-month loan. The loan was then extended for the remainder of the 2020–21 season.

Ogle was released by Accrington at the end of the 2020–21 season.

=== Hartlepool United ===
On 12 July 2021, Ogle joined newly promoted League Two side Hartlepool United on a two-year deal. In the 2021–22 season, Ogle made 24 appearances in all competitions for Pools.

=== Scunthorpe United ===
At the start of the 2022–23 season, Ogle's first-team opportunities at Hartlepool became limited due to him becoming the club's third-choice right-back. As a result, on 29 July 2022, he signed for National League club Scunthorpe United on a free transfer. Despite relegation to the National League North, Ogle received plaudits for his performances and was named as the club's Supporters' and Players' Player of the Year at the end of the 2022–23 season. He made a total of 38 league appearances in his debut season for The Iron.

In June 2023, it was revealed Scunthorpe had turned a bid from National League side Oldham Athletic to sign Ogle. In a statement, the club said he remained firmly in manager Jimmy Dean's plans for the upcoming 2023–24 season.

=== Oldham Athletic ===
On 29 May 2024, it was announced Reagan had turned down a new contract with Scunthorpe to join Oldham Athletic. He scored his first goal for Oldham on his fourth appearance for the club in a 4–1 loss to Aldershot Town. In June 2025, Ogle became the first footballer from Wollongong to play at Wembley Stadium as Oldham won promotion to League Two via the play-offs. In January 2026, Ogle suffered from a spinal injury which saw him ruled out for four months. Due to this, he played only 17 times in all competitions for Oldham in the 2025–26 season.

=== Scunthorpe United ===
In June 2026, Ogle rejoined Scunthorpe on a free transfer.

== Personal life ==
Ogle was born in Wollongong, Australia and moved to England when he was 11. He attended Ribblesdale High School in Clitheroe.

== Style of play ==
Ogle predominantly plays at right-back but is a versatile footballer who can also play at left-back, centre-half and as a central midfielder. Upon signing for Scunthorpe, he described himself as "very athletic, quick and strong and like to put in a tackle". He is also known for having a long throw-in.

== Career statistics ==
As of 23 August 2025

Appearances and goals by club, season and competition
Club	Season	League			FA Cup		League Cup		Other		Total	
Club	Season	Division	Apps	Goals	Apps	Goals	Apps	Goals	Apps	Goals	Apps	Goals
Accrington Stanley	2016–17	League Two	1	0	0	0	0	0	1 (Note: Appearance(s) in EFL Trophy)	0	2	0
Accrington Stanley	2017–18	League Two	3	0	0	0	0	0	3	0	6	0
Accrington Stanley	2018–19	League One	0	0	0	0	0	0	0	0	0	0
Accrington Stanley	2019–20	League One	0	0	0	0	0	0	0	0	0	0
Accrington Stanley	2020–21	League One	0	0	0	0	0	0	0	0	0	0
Accrington Stanley	Total		4	0	0	0	0	0	4	0	8	0
Ramsbottom United (loan)	2016–17	NPL Division One North	4	1	0	0	—		0	0	4	1
Wealdstone (loan)	2017–18	National League South	2	0	0	0	—		1 (Note: Appearance(s) in FA Trophy)	0	3	0
Southport (loan)	2018–19	National League North	34	0	4	0	—		0	0	38	0
Southport (loan)	2019–20	National League North	22	0	1	0	—		1	0	24	0
Southport (loan)	Total		56	0	5	0	0	0	1	0	62	0
AFC Fylde (loan)	2020–21	National League North	3	0	1	0	—		2	0	6	0
Altrincham (loan)	2020–21	National League	12	0	0	0	—		0	0	12	0
Hartlepool United	2021–22	League Two	18	0	2	0	0	0	4	0	24	0
Scunthorpe United	2022–23	National League	38	0	1	0	0	0	0	0	39	0
Scunthorpe United	2023–24	National League North	38	1	0	0	—		1	0	39	1
Scunthorpe United	Total		76	1	1	0	0	0	1	0	78	1
Oldham Athletic	2024–25	National League	36	1	2	0	0	0	3 (Note: Appearances in National League play-offs)	0	41	1
Oldham Athletic	2025–26	League Two	14	1	0	0	1	1	2	1	17	3
Oldham Athletic	Total		50	2	2	0	1	1	5	1	58	3
Career total			225	4	11	0	1	1	18	1	255	6

== Honours ==
Oldham Athletic

- National League play-offs: 2025

Individual

- Southport Young Player of the Year: 2018–19
- Scunthorpe United Players' Player of the Year: 2022–23
- Scunthorpe United Supporters' Player of the Year: 2022–23
