= Keenan Forson =

English footballer (born 2001)

Keenan Appiah-Forson
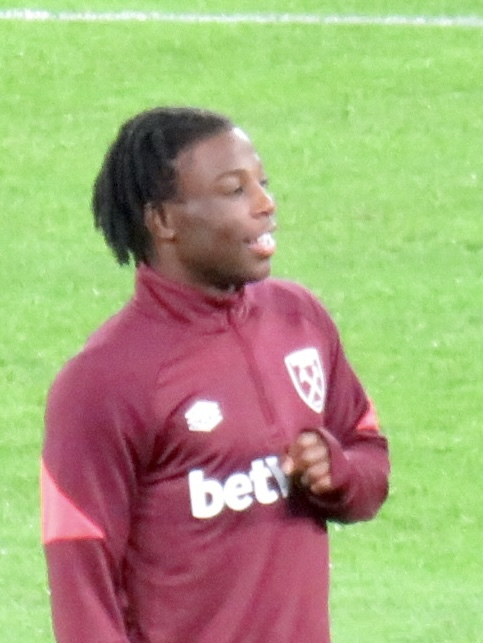
- Appiah-Forson warming up for West Ham United in 2021

Personal information
- Full name: Keenan Appiah-Forson
- Date of birth: 16 October 2001 (age 25)
- Place of birth: Greenwich, England
- Height: 1.60 m (5 ft 3 in)
- Position: Central midfielder

Team information
- Current team: Oldham Athletic

Youth career
- –2021: West Ham United

Senior career*
Years	Team	Apps	(Gls)
2021–2024	West Ham United	0	(0)
2023–2024	→ Dagenham & Redbridge (loan)	27	(1)
2024–2026	Southend United	77	(4)
2026–	Oldham Athletic	5	(1)
- * Club domestic league appearances and goals as of 18:34, 25 April 2026 (UTC)

Keenan Appiah-Forson (born 16 October 2001) is an English professional footballer who plays as a central midfielder for EFL League Two club Oldham Athletic. A product of the West Ham United academy, he made senior appearances in both the UEFA Europa League and the UEFA Europa Conference League before gaining first-team experience on loan at Dagenham & Redbridge. Following his departure from West Ham in 2024, he joined Southend United, where he became a regular first-team player before signing for Oldham Athletic in 2026. He is of Ghanaian descent.

== Early life ==
Appiah-Forson was born in Greenwich, London, and is of Ghanaian descent. He joined the West Ham United academy at the age of 14 and progressed through the club's youth system.

== Club career ==
=== West Ham United ===
Appiah-Forson joined West Ham United's academy in 2015 and developed through the club's youth ranks, becoming a regular for the under-18 and under-23 sides. His performances earned him opportunities to train with the senior squad.

He made his senior debut on 9 December 2021, coming on as a substitute for Sonny Perkins in West Ham's UEFA Europa League group-stage match against Dinamo Zagreb.

In February 2022, Forson signed a new contract which would see him at the club until the summer of 2023. The deal included the option to extend his contract for a further year.

During the 2022–23 season, he made his UEFA Europa Conference League debut in the group-stage victory over FCSB. West Ham went on to win the competition, with Appiah-Forson being part of the club's successful European campaign.

=== Loan to Dagenham & Redbridge ===
In September 2023, Appiah-Forson joined National League club Dagenham & Redbridge on loan for the remainder of the 2023–24 season. He made 27 league appearances and scored his first senior goal before returning to West Ham at the end of the campaign.

Following the conclusion of the season, West Ham announced that Appiah-Forson would leave the club upon the expiry of his contract.

=== Southend United ===
On 30 August 2024, Appiah-Forson signed a two-year contract with National League club Southend United following his departure from West Ham. He quickly established himself as a regular member of the first team and became an important part of Southend's midfield.

During his spell with the club, he made 77 league appearances and scored four goals, helping Southend reach the National League promotion play-offs and win the 2025–26 FA Trophy before leaving at the end of the 2025–26 season.

=== Oldham Athletic ===
On 19 June 2026, Appiah-Forson agreed to join League Two club Oldham Athletic on a two-year deal after leaving Southend United.

== Playing style ==
Appiah-Forson primarily plays as a central midfielder. He has described himself as a box-to-box midfielder capable of contributing in both defensive and attacking phases of play. Southend United also highlighted his energy, athleticism and versatility in midfield.

== Career statistics ==
As of match played 20 April 2024

Appearances and goals by club, season and competition
Club	Season	League			FA Cup		EFL Cup		Europe		Other		Total	
Club	Season	Division	Apps	Goals	Apps	Goals	Apps	Goals	Apps	Goals	Apps	Goals	Apps	Goals
West Ham United U21	2019–20	—	—		—		—		—		2 (Note: Appearance(s) in EFL Trophy)	0	2	0
West Ham United U21	2020–21	—	—		—		—		—		2	0	2	0
West Ham United U21	2021–22	—	—		—		—		—		3	1	3	1
West Ham United U21	2022–23	—	—		—		—		—		3	0	3	0
West Ham United U21	Total		—		—		—		—		10	1	10	1
West Ham United	2021–22	Premier League	0	0	0	0	0	0	1 (Note: Appearance(s) in UEFA Europa League)	0	—		1	0
West Ham United	2022–23	Premier League	0	0	0	0	0	0	1 (Note: Appearance(s) in UEFA Europa Conference League)	0	—		1	0
West Ham United	Total		0	0	0	0	0	0	2	0	—		2	0
Dagenham & Redbridge (loan)	2023–24	National League	27	1	0	0	—		—		1 (Note: Appearance(s) in FA Trophy)	0	28	1
Career total			27	1	0	0	0	0	2	0	11	1	40	2

== Honours ==
West Ham United

- UEFA Europa Conference League: 2022–23

Southend United

- FA Trophy: 2025–26
