= Tom Donaghy (footballer) =

English footballer (born 2003)

Personal information
- Full name: Thomas Patrick Donaghy
- Date of birth: 18 April 2003 (age 23)
- Place of birth: Leeds, England
- Position: Goalkeeper

Team information
- Current team: Oldham Athletic
- Number: 31

Youth career
- Bradford City

Senior career*
Years	Team	Apps	(Gls)
2021–2025	Fleetwood Town	0	(0)
2021–2022	→ Farsley Celtic (loan)	11	(0)
2022	→ Lancaster City (loan)	2	(0)
2023–2023	→ Colne (loan)	5	(0)
2023	→ Waterford (loan)	0	(0)
2024–2025	→ Hereford (loan)	8	(0)
2025	→ Boston United (loan)	2	(0)
2025–	Oldham Athletic	10	(0)
- * Club domestic league appearances and goals as of 10:12, 5 March 2025 (UTC)

Thomas Patrick Donaghy (born 18 April 2003) is an English professional footballer who plays as a goalkeeper for EFL League Two club Oldham Athletic.

== Career ==
Donaghy signed with Fleetwood Town from Bradford City on 16 May 2021, initially signing a one-year contract with the option of a further year. He kept five consecutive clean sheets in eleven league games at Farsley Celtic, before being recalled from his loan spell on 23 December 2021. On 29 September 2022, he joined Northern Premier League Premier Division side Lancaster City on a 28-day youth loan. He played two league games for the club. On 22 December 2022, he joined Colne on loan. On 16 February 2023, he joined Fleetwood's sister club Waterford on loan in the League of Ireland First Division. He returned to Fleetwood on 17 June, having played only in the Munster Senior Cup. He made his first-team debut for Fleetwood on 10 October 2023, in a 3–3 draw at Wigan Athletic in the EFL Trophy; he saved two penalty kicks in the resulting shoot-out.

On 8 January 2025, he joined National League club Boston United on a month-long loan.

On 14 February 2025, he moved once again on loan, this time to Oldham Athletic on a deal which would last until the end of the 2024-25 season.

On 20 June 2025, after Oldham were promoted to League Two, the club announced the player had signed a new two-year deal.

== Career statistics ==
As of match played 4 March 2025

Appearances and goals by club, season and competition
Club	Season	League			National cup (Note: Includes FA Cup, FAI Cup)		League Cup		Other		Total	
Club	Season	Division	Apps	Goals	Apps	Goals	Apps	Goals	Apps	Goals	Apps	Goals
Fleetwood Town	2021–22	League One	0	0	0	0	0	0	0	0	0	0
Fleetwood Town	2022–23	League One	0	0	0	0	0	0	0	0	0	0
Fleetwood Town	2023–24	League One	0	0	0	0	0	0	1 (Note: Appearance in EFL Trophy)	0	1	0
Fleetwood Town	2024–25	League Two	0	0	0	0	0	0	0	0	0	0
Fleetwood Town	Total		0	0	0	0	0	0	1	0	1	0
Farsley Celtic (loan)	2021–22	National League North	11	0	0	0	—		2 (Note: Appearance(s) in FA Trophy)	0	13	0
Lancaster City (loan)	2022–23	Northern Premier	2	0	0	0	—		0	0	2	0
Colne (loan)	2022–23	Northern Premier	5	0	0	0	—		0	0	5	0
Waterford (loan)	2023	League of Ireland First Division	0	0	0	0	—		1 (Note: Appearance in Munster Senior Cup)	0	1	0
Hereford (loan)	2024–25	National League North	8	0	—		—		1	0	9	0
Boston United (loan)	2024–25	National League	2	0	—		—		0	0	2	0
Oldham Athletic (loan)	2024–25	National League	5	0	—		—		0	0	5	0
Career total			33	0	0	0	0	0	5	0	38	0

== Honours ==
Oldham Athletic

- National League play-offs: 2025
