= 2024–25 Blackburn Rovers F.C. season =

149th season in existence of Blackburn Rovers FC

Blackburn Rovers
2024–25 season
- Owner: Venky's London Ltd.
- CEO: Steve Waggott
- Head coach: John Eustace (until 13 February); David Lowe (interim); Valérien Ismaël (from 25 February)
- Stadium: Ewood Park
- Championship: 7th
- FA Cup: Fourth round
- EFL Cup: Second round
- Top goalscorer: League: Yūki Ōhashi (8); All: Andreas Weimann (9)
- Highest home attendance: 25,909
- Lowest home attendance: 12,819
- Average home league attendance: 16,161
Home colours	Away colours	Third colours

The 2024–25 season was the 137th season in the history of Blackburn Rovers Football Club and their seventh consecutive season in the Championship. In addition to the domestic league, the club also participated in the FA Cup and the EFL Cup.

== Season summary ==
=== May ===
On 18 May 2024, Rovers announced their retained list, The club confirmed they activated the one-year options in the contracts of Sam Gallagher & Tyrhys Dolan, meaning the attacking duo will remain contracted to the club for a further 12 months, discussions are ongoing with Kyle McFadzean & John Fleck while Sam Barnes, Lenni Cirino, Ben Fyles, Jay Haddow, Jared Harlock, Ethan Walker & Charlie Weston, along with second year scholar Ben Thirkill, will not be retained by the club upon the expiration of their current agreements.

=== June ===
On 14 June 2024, Rovers announced the appointments of Rudy Gestede as Head of Football Operations, replacing Gregg Broughton, and the return of John Park as Head of Recruitment, replacing Sean Kimberley.

=== July ===
On 2 July 2024, Rovers announced that Igor Tyjon will remain at the club he is one of 14 promising players to sign a two-year scholarship contract with the club until 2026 along with Michael Decandia, Isaac Dunn, Valentin Joseph, Leon Kelly-Quinn, Freddie Leatherbarrow, Bruce Leeming, Tyler Mansbridge, Harvey Pates, Aaron Potter, Jayden Sergeant, Luke Thompson, Frank Vare & Blake Wolsoncroft.

On 3 July 2024, Rovers announced that a number of Academy graduates have now signed their first professional contracts with the club, Lewis Bell, Rhys Doherty, Adam Khan, Matty Litherland, Paul Murphy-Worrell, Brandon Powell & Zack Stritch signed one-year contracts until 2025, with the option of an extra 12 months & Solomon Honor signed a two-year deal until 2026, with a 12-month option.

On 6 July 2024, Rovers announced the appointment of Adam Owen as the club's new Head of Technical Development.

On 12 July 2024, Rovers announced u21 defender Charlie Olson had signed a new 2-year contract until 2026, with the option of a further 12 months.

On 15 July 2024, Rovers announced u21 midfielder Isaac Whitehall had signed a new 1-year contract until 2025, with the option of a further 12 months.

On 17 July 2024, Rovers announced u21 winger Harrison Wood had signed his 1st professional contract, a 2-year deal until 2026.

=== August ===
On 2 August 2024, Rovers announced u18 attacker Nathan Dlamini had signed a new 1-year contract until 2025, with the option of a further 12 months.

On 11 August 2024, Rovers announced u18 attacking midfielder Patrik Farkas had signed his 1st professional contract, a 2-year deal until 2026.

=== September ===
On 6 September 2024, Rovers announced u21 defender Max Davies had signed his 1st professional contract, a 2-year deal until 2026.

On 13 September 2024, Rovers announced u18 attacking midfielder Dan Shaw had signed his 1st professional contract, a 2-year deal until 2026.

=== November ===
On 15 November 2024, Rovers announced u21 defender Tom Atcheson had signed a new long term contract, a 4-year deal until 2028, with the option of a further 12 months.

On 20 November 2024, Rovers announced John Park had left his role as Head of Recruitment.

=== January ===
On 7 January 2025, Rovers announced u21 goalkeeper Nicholas Michalski had signed a new 2-year deal until 2027.

=== February ===
On 13 February 2025, Rovers announced head coach John Eustace had left the club along with his assistants Matt Gardiner and Keith Downing to join Derby County, David Lowe was put in temporary charge.

On 25 February 2025, Rovers announced the appointment of Valérien Ismaël as head coach on a 3 and half year contract.

On 26 February 2025, Rovers announced the appointment of Dean Whitehead as assistant head coach.

=== April ===
On 3 April 2025, Rovers announced Dominic Hyam will remain at the club until June 2026 after activating the option of a further 12 months.

On 4 April 2025, Rovers announced Yuri Ribeiro had signed a new 2 year contract until 2027 with the option of a further 12 months.

On 23 April 2025, Rovers announced u18 right back Lucas Houghton had signed his 1st professional contract, a 2-year deal until 2027 with the option of a further 12 months.

On 26 April 2025, Rovers announced that Sondre Tronstad was voted player of the season.

=== May ===
On 2 May 2025, Rovers announced that Andi Weimann's goal against Burnley at Turf Moor was voted goal of the season.

On 5 May 2025, Rovers announced that head of academy Stuart Jones had left the club.

On 9 May 2025, Rovers announced u21 defender George Pratt had signed a new 1 year contract until 2026 with the option of a further 12 months.

On 10 May 2025, Rovers announced u21 midfielder Harley O'Grady-Macken had signed a new 1 year contract until 2026 with the option of a further 12 months.

On 11 May 2025, Rovers announced u21 defender Brandon Powell had signed a new 2 year contract until 2027 with the option of a further 12 months.

On 12 May 2025, Rovers announced u21 defender Matty Litherland had signed a new 2 year contract until 2027 with the option of a further 12 months.

On 16 May 2025, Rovers announced he appointment of Paul Gray as the club’s new Head of Academy, Paul will be supported in the role by John Prince, who recently replaced Jordan McCann as Rovers’ Head of Academy Coaching.

On 18 May 2025, Rovers announced u21 goalkeeper Jack Barrett had signed a new 2 year contract until 2027 with the option of a further 12 months.

== Backroom staff ==
As of 30 Aug 2024

=== Senior football ===
Position	Staff
Head Coach	(France) Valérien Ismaël
Head of Football Operations	(Benin) Rudy Gestede
Head of Recruitment	
Head of Technical	(Wales) Adam Owen
Assistant Head Coach	(England) Dean Whitehead
First-Team Coach	(England) David Lowe
Goalkeeping Coach	(England) Ben Benson
First Team Technical Coach & Head of Player Development	(Northern Ireland) Damien Johnson
Lead Sports Scientist	(England) Karl Hodges
Consultant	(England) Dr. Chris Dalton
Head of Medical Services	(England) Andrew Procter
Head of Performance Analysis	(England) Adam Collins
Kit Manager	(England) Paul Schofield

=== Academy football ===
Position	Staff
Head of Academy	(Northern Ireland) Paul Gray
Head of Academy Coaching	(England) John Prince
Under-21s Lead Coach	(England) Mike Sheron
Under-18s Lead Coach	(England) Ryan Kidd
Head of Academy Sports Science and Medical	(England) Russ Wrigley
Head of Academy Recruitment	(England) Michael Cribley
Academy Secretary	(England) Dawn Dunn

== First-team squad ==
Players and squad numbers last updated on 1 February 2024. List is representative of players who have made an appearance for the first-team this season and of information available on Rovers.co.uk.

Note: Flags indicate national team as has been defined under FIFA eligibility rules. Players may hold more than one non-FIFA nationality.

No.	Pos.	Nat.	Name	Date of birth & age	Year joined	Contract expires	Joined from	Other	Ref
Goalkeepers
34	GK	(England)	Jack Barrett	4 June 2002 (age 24)	2024	2027 (+1)	(England) Everton	On loan at Workington, Option for 12-month extension	
35	GK	(England)	Jordan Eastham	8 September 2001 (age 25)	2018	2025	Academy	On loan at Ashton United	
38	GK	(England)	Nicholas Michalski	14 March 2007 (age 19)	2023	2026	Academy		
1	GK	(England)	Aynsley Pears	23 April 1998 (age 28)	2020	2027	(England) Middlesbrough		
12	GK	(Hungary)	Balázs Tóth	4 September 1997 (age 29)	2024	2027	(Hungary) Fehérvár		
Defenders
48	DF	(Northern Ireland)	Tom Atcheson	22 October 2006 (age 20)	2023	2026	Academy		
15	DF	(England)	Danny Batth	21 September 1990 (age 36)	2024	2025	(England) Norwich City		
25	DF	(England)	Jake Batty	5 April 2005 (age 21)	2021	2025	Academy	On loan at Accrington Stanley	
24	DF	(Wales)	Owen Beck	9 August 2002 (age 24)	2024	2025	(England) Liverpool	On loan from Liverpool	
2	DF	(England)	Callum Brittain	12 March 1998 (age 28)	2022	2026	(England) Barnsley		
17	DF	(England)	Hayden Carter	17 December 1999 (age 26)	2014	2027	Academy		
39	DF	(United States)	Leo Duru	12 January 2005 (age 21)	2015	2026 (+1)	Academy	On loan at Barrow, Option for 12-month extension	
5	DF	(Scotland)	Dominic Hyam	20 December 1995 (age 30)	2022	2026	(England) Coventry City		
40	DF	(England)	Matty Litherland	31 October 2005 (age 21)	2011	2027 (+1)	Academy	Option for 12-month extension, On loan at Curzon Ashton	
26	DF	(Republic of Ireland)	Connor O'Riordan	19 October 2003 (age 23)	2024	2028	(England) Crewe Alexandra	On loan at Crewe Alexandra	
3	DF	(England)	Harry Pickering	29 December 1998 (age 27)	2021	2027 (+1)	(England) Crewe Alexandra	Option for 12-month extension	
50	DF	(England)	Brandon Powell	17 October 2005 (age 21)	2022	2027 (+1)	Academy	Option for 12-month extension	
43	DF	(England)	George Pratt	17 September 2003 (age 23)	2021	2026 (+1)	Academy	Option for 12-month extension	
4	DF	(Portugal)	Yuri Ribeiro	24 January 1997 (age 29)	2025	2027 (+1)	(Portugal) Braga	Option for 12-month extension	
31	DF	(England)	Dion Sanderson	15 December 1999 (age 26)	2025	2025	(England) Birmingham City	On loan from Birmingham City	
16	DF	(England)	Scott Wharton	3 October 1997 (age 29)	2010	2027	Academy		
Midfielders
21	MF	(England)	John Buckley	13 October 1999 (age 27)	2006	2027	Academy		
8	MF	(England)	Todd Cantwell	27 March 1998 (age 28)	2024	2027	(Scotland) Rangers		
33	MF	(England)	Amario Cozier-Duberry	29 May 2005 (age 21)	2024	2025	(England) Brighton & Hove Albion	On loan from Brighton & Hove Albion	
46	MF	(England)	Isaac Dunn		2024	2026	Academy		
36	MF	(England)	James Edmondson	1 November 2005 (age 21)	2011	2027	Academy		
28	MF	(England)	Adam Forshaw	8 October 1991 (age 35)	2025	2025	(England) Plymouth Argyle		
30	MF	(England)	Jake Garrett	10 March 2003 (age 23)	2013	2027	Academy	On loan at Tranmere Rovers	
22	MF	(Republic of Ireland)	Zak Gilsenan	8 May 2003 (age 23)	2019	2025 (+1)	(England) Liverpool	Option for 12-month extension	
51	MF	(Scotland)	Kristi Montgomery	31 May 2004 (age 22)	2013	2026 (+1)	Academy	Option for 12-month extension	
41	MF	(England)	Harley O'Grady-Macken	9 December 2004 (age 21)	2021	2026 (+1)	(England) Wolverhampton Wanderers	Option for 12-month extension	
11	MF	(England)	Joe Rankin-Costello	26 July 1999 (age 27)	2014	2027	Academy		
27	MF	(England)	Lewis Travis	16 October 1997 (age 29)	2014	2026	Academy		
6	MF	(Norway)	Sondre Tronstad	26 August 1995 (age 31)	2023	2026	(Netherlands) Vitesse		
49	MF	(England)	Frank Vare	12 September 2007 (age 19)	2018	2026	Academy		
Forwards
37	FW	(Republic of Ireland)	Tom Bloxham	30 April 2005 (age 21)	2023	2025	(England) Tottenham Hotspur		
42	FW	(Nigeria)	Emmanuel Dennis	15 November 1997 (age 28)	2025	2025	(England) Nottingham Forest	On loan from Nottingham Forest	
10	FW	(England)	Tyrhys Dolan	28 December 2001 (age 24)	2020	2025	(England) Preston North End		
9	FW	(Senegal)	Makhtar Gueye	4 December 1997 (age 28)	2024	2027 (+1)	(Belgium) RWD Molenbeek	Option for 12-month extension	
19	FW	(Wales)	Ryan Hedges	8 July 1995 (age 31)	2022	2026	(Scotland) Aberdeen		
47	FW	(Sierra Leone)	Augustus Kargbo	24 August 1999 (age 27)	2025	2027	(Italy) Cesena		
20	FW	(England)	Harry Leonard	12 September 2003 (age 23)	2013	2027	Academy		
18	FW	(England)	Dilan Markanday	20 August 2001 (age 25)	2022	2025 (+1)	(England) Tottenham Hotspur	On loan at Leyton Orient, Option for 12-month extension	
44	FW	(France)	Exaucé Mafoumbi	26 March 2005 (age 21)	2024	2027 (+1)	(France) Nantes	On loan at Lierse, Option for 12-month extension	
23	FW	(Japan)	Yūki Ōhashi	27 July 1996 (age 30)	2024	2027 (+1)	(Japan) Sanfrecce Hiroshima	Option for 12-month extension	
32	FW	(England)	Igor Tyjon	20 March 2008 (age 18)	2023	2026	Academy		
29	FW	(Wales)	Jack Vale	3 March 2001 (age 25)	2017	2025 (+1)	Academy	On loan at Motherwell, Option for 12-month extension	
14	FW	(Austria)	Andi Weimann	5 August 1991 (age 35)	2024	2025	(England) Bristol City		
45	FW	(England)	Cauley Woodrow	2 December 1994 (age 31)	2025	2025	(England) Luton Town	On loan from Luton Town	

== Transfers ==
=== In ===
Date	Pos.	Player	From	Fee	Ref.
15 June 2024	LW	Aodhan Doherty (NIR) (Note: Signed initially for the Under-21s)	Linfield (NIR)	Undisclosed	
16 July 2024	GK	Jack Barrett (ENG)	Everton (ENG)	Free	
30 July 2024	CF	Makhtar Gueye (SEN)	RWD Molenbeek (BEL)	Undisclosed	
31 July 2024	CF	Yūki Ōhashi (JPN)	Sanfrecce Hiroshima (JPN)	Undisclosed	
31 July 2024	CF	Exaucé Mafoumbi (FRA)	Nantes (FRA)	Free	
1 August 2024	CB	Danny Batth (ENG)	Norwich City (ENG)	Free	
1 August 2024	CF	Andreas Weimann (AUT)	Bristol City (ENG)	Free	
30 August 2024	GK	Balázs Tóth (HUN)	Fehérvár (HUN)	Undisclosed	
30 August 2024	CM	Todd Cantwell (ENG)	Rangers (SCO)	Undisclosed	
1 November 2024	CB	Silver Eze (ENG) (Note: Signed initially for the Under-18s)	Accrington Stanley (ENG)	Undisclosed	
11 January 2025	CM	Adam Forshaw (ENG)	Plymouth Argyle (ENG)	Free	
31 January 2025	CF	Augustus Kargbo (SLE)	Cesena (ITA)	Undisclosed	
3 February 2025	LB	Yuri Ribeiro (POR)	Braga (POR)	Free	

=== Out ===
Date	Pos	Player	To	Fee	Ref
3 July 2024	GK	Leopold Wahlstedt (SWE)	AGF (DEN)	Undisclosed	
10 July 2024	CF	Semir Telalović (GER)	SSV Ulm (GER)	Undisclosed	
31 July 2024	CM	Rory Finneran (IRL)	Newcastle United (ENG)	Tribunal (Note: tribunal will be required to determine the compensation fee)	
31 July 2024	CF	Sam Gallagher (ENG)	Stoke City (ENG)	Undisclosed	
2 August 2024	LB	Georgie Gent (ENG)	Barnsley (ENG)	Undisclosed	
16 August 2024	CAM	Sammie Szmodics (IRL)	Ipswich Town (ENG)	Undisclosed	
24 January 2025	LW	Dominik Biniek (POL)	Bruk-Bet Termalica Nieciecza (POL)	Free	
3 February 2025	GK	Joe Hilton (ENG)	Bradford City (ENG)	Undisclosed	

=== Loaned in ===
Date	Pos	Player	From	Date until	Ref
27 August 2024	LB	Owen Beck (WAL)	Liverpool (ENG)	End of Season	
29 August 2024	CM	Lewis Baker (ENG)	Stoke City (ENG)	8 January 2025 (Note: On 8 January, Baker was recalled back to Stoke.)	
30 August 2024	CAM	Amario Cozier-Duberry (ENG)	Brighton & Hove Albion (ENG)	End of Season	
10 January 2025	CB	Dion Sanderson (ENG)	Birmingham City (ENG)	End of Season	
3 February 2025	CF	Emmanuel Dennis (NGA)	Nottingham Forest (ENG)	End of Season	
3 February 2025	CF	Cauley Woodrow (ENG)	Luton Town (ENG)	End of Season	

=== Loaned out ===
Date	Pos.	Player	To	Date until	Ref.
10 July 2024	GK	Felix Goddard (ENG)	Dundalk (IRL)	1 January 2025	
29 July 2024	GK	Nicholas Michalski (ENG)	Bamber Bridge (ENG)	25 September 2024 (Note: On 25 September, Michalski was recalled back from his half-season loan at Bamber Bridge)	
3 August 2024	CM	Jake Garrett (ENG)	Bristol Rovers (ENG)	3 January 2025 (Note: On 3 January, Garrett was recalled back from his loan at Bristol Rovers)	
6 August 2024	CB	Tom Atcheson (NIR)	Marine (ENG)	1 January 2025	
6 August 2024	CM	Kristi Montgomery (SCO)	Marine (ENG)	1 January 2025	
10 August 2024	CB	Patrick Gamble (ENG)	AFC Fylde (ENG)	14 January 2025 (Note: On 14 January, Gamble was recalled back from his loan at AFC Fylde)	
11 August 2024	RW	Harrison Wood (ENG)	Annan Athletic (SCO)	January 2025	
12 August 2024	CB	Connor O'Riordan (IRL)	Cambridge United (ENG)	9 January 2025 (Note: On 9 January, O'Riordan was recalled back from his loan at Cambridge United)	
12 August 2024	RW	Lorenze Mullarkey-Matthews (ENG)	Bamber Bridge (ENG)	January 2025	
15 August 2024	CM	Joe Boggan (ENG)	Macclesfield (ENG)	15 September 2024	
15 August 2024	RW	Dilan Markanday (ENG)	Chesterfield (ENG)	16 January 2025 (Note: On 16 January, Markanday was recalled back from his loan at Chesterfield and subsequently loaned to Leyton Orient)	
17 August 2024	GK	Solomon Honor (ENG)	Clitheroe (ENG)	11 September 2024	
29 August 2024	LB	Jake Batty (ENG)	Accrington Stanley (ENG)	End of Season	
30 August 2024	CF	Jack Vale (WAL)	Motherwell (SCO)	End of Season	
7 September 2024	GK	Jordan Eastham (ENG)	Ashton United (ENG)	End of Season (Note: On 7 January, Eastham's loan at Ashton United was extended until the end of the season)	
10 September 2024	CM	Jalil Saadi (MAR)	Ethnikos Achna (CYP)	End of Season	
13 September 2024	AM	Daniel Shaw (ENG)	Alvechurch (ENG)	27 October 2024	
11 October 2024	CB	Charlie Olson (ENG)	Altrincham (ENG)	9 November 2024	
18 October 2024	CB	Max Davies (ENG)	Warrington Rylands (ENG)	17 November 2024	
19 October 2024	GK	Nicholas Michalski (ENG)	City of Liverpool (ENG)	24 December 2024 (Note: On 24 December, Michalski was recalled back from his loan at City of Liverpool)	
21 October 2024	CM	James Edmondson (ENG)	Macclesfield (ENG)	2 January 2025 (Note: On 21 November, Edmondson's loan at Macclesfield was extended through to January)	
22 October 2024	GK	Solomon Honor (ENG)	Atherton Collieries (ENG)	26 April 2025 (Note: On 19 November, Honor's loan at Atherton was extended until the end of April)	
26 October 2024	CM	Patrik Farkas (HUN)	City of Liverpool (ENG)	24 November 2024	
12 November 2024	GK	Adam Khan (PAK)	City of Liverpool (ENG)	6 December 2024	
26 November 2024	LB	Brandon Powell (ENG)	Chorley (ENG)	22 January 2025 (Note: On 24 December, Powell's loan at Chorley was extended by a further month)	
5 December 2024	CB	Charlie Olson (ENG)	Altrincham (ENG)	End of Season (Note: On 6 January, Olson's loan at Altrincham was extended until the end of season)	
5 December 2024	CB	Teddy Ramwell (ENG)	City of Liverpool (ENG)	4 January 2025	
7 January 2025	GK	Felix Goddard (ENG)	Ebbsfleet United (ENG)	End of Season	
9 January 2025	RW	Lewis Bell (ENG)	Marine (ENG)	15 February 2025	
9 January 2025	RB	Leo Duru (USA)	Barrow (ENG)	End of Season	
16 January 2025	RW	Dilan Markanday (ENG)	Leyton Orient (ENG)	End of Season	
20 January 2025	CB	Connor O'Riordan (IRL)	Crewe Alexandra (ENG)	End of Season	
25 January 2025	RW	Harrison Wood (ENG)	Radcliffe (ENG)	26 February 2025	
31 January 2025	DM	Jake Garrett (ENG)	Tranmere Rovers (ENG)	End of Season	
3 February 2025	CF	Exaucé Mafoumbi (FRA)	Lierse (BEL)	End of Season	
14 February 2025	GK	Jack Barrett (ENG)	Workington (ENG)	End of Season	
14 February 2025	CM	Kristi Montgomery (SCO)	Chorley (ENG)	4 April 2025 (Note: On 14 March, Montgomery's loan at Chorley was extended until the end of season, However, on 4 April, he was recalled back)	
21 March 2025	CB	Matty Litherland (ENG)	Curzon Ashton (ENG)	End of Season	
27 March 2025	RW	Harrison Wood (ENG)	Warrington Rylands (ENG)	End of Season	
28 March 2025	LB	Brandon Powell (ENG)	Altrincham (ENG)	5 May 2025	

=== Released / Out of Contract ===
Date	Pos.	Player	Subsequent club	Join date	Ref.
30 June 2024	CB	Sam Barnes (ENG)	Barrow (ENG)	1 July 2024	
30 June 2024	LB	Lenni Cirino (MSR)	Clitheroe (ENG)	20 September 2024	
30 June 2024	CM	John Fleck (SCO)	Chesterfield (ENG)	10 September 2024	
30 June 2024	LW	Ben Fyles (WAL)			
30 June 2024	RB	Jay Haddow (JPN)	Kitchee (HKG)	1 July 2024	
30 June 2024	CM	Jared Harlock (ENG)	Missouri State Bears (USA)	20 September 2024	
30 June 2024	CF	Junior Nsangou (POL)	Atlético Albacete (SPA)	7 August 2024	
30 June 2024	CB	Ben Thirkill (ENG)	Avro (ENG)	16 October 2024	
30 June 2024	LW	Ethan Walker (ENG)	Ayr United (SCO)	1 July 2024	
30 June 2024	CM	Charlie Weston (ENG)	Barrow (ENG)	2 September 2024	
22 January 2025	CB	Kyle McFadzean (ENG)	Chesterfield (ENG)	22 January 2025	
17 February 2025	LW	Arnór Sigurðsson (ISL)	Malmö (SWE)	19 February 2025	

== Pre-season and friendlies ==
On 16 May, Rovers announced their first three pre-season friendlies, against Accrington Stanley, Wigan Athletic and Stockport County. A month later, a further two fixtures was confirmed, against Tranmere Rovers behind closed doors and Morecambe. On 28 June, a pre-season training camp in Austria was also confirmed, along with a friendly against 1. FC Nürnberg.

Win Draw Loss Fixtures

6 July 2024 Friendly	Accrington Stanley	1–2	Blackburn Rovers	Accrington
14:00 BST	Woods 73'	Report	Rankin-Costello 19'; Markanday 61'	Stadium: Crown Ground; Attendance: 3,278
Note: 2 x 60min matches

13 July 2024 Friendly	Blackburn Rovers	8–3	Tranmere Rovers	Blackburn
TBC BST	Brittain 9'; Dolan 17'; Rankin-Costello 24'; Markanday 65', 82'; Gamble 70'; Vale 91'; Buckley 105' (pen.)	Report	Hawkes; Saunders 112', 120'	Stadium: Blackburn Rovers Senior Training Centre; Attendance: 0 (behind closed doors)
Note: 2 x 60min matches

20 July 2024 Friendly	1. FC Nürnberg	2–1	Blackburn Rovers	Kössen, Austria
17:00 CEST (16:00 BST)	Soares 2'; Schleimer 24'		Brittain 33'	Stadium: Kaiserwinkl Arena

26 July 2024 Friendly	Morecambe	1–1	Blackburn Rovers	Morecambe
19:30 BST	Edwards 12'	Report	Hedges 30'	Stadium: Mazuma Mobile Stadium

27 July 2024 Friendly	Wigan Athletic	1–1	Blackburn Rovers	Wigan
15:00 BST	Aasgaard 80'	Report	Vale 65'	Stadium: Brick Community Stadium

2 August 2024 Friendly	Stockport County	0–1	Blackburn Rovers	Stockport
19:30 BST		Report	Dolan 51' (pen.)	Stadium: Edgeley Park; Attendance: 2,790

== Competitions ==
=== Overall record ===
Competition	First match	Last match	Starting round	Final position	Record							
Competition	First match	Last match	Starting round	Final position	Pld	W	D	L	GF	GA	GD	Win %
Championship	9 August 2024	3 May 2025	Matchday 1	7th	46	19	9	18	53	48	+5	41.30
FA Cup	11 January 2025	9 February 2025	Third round	Fourth round	2	1	0	1	1	2	−1	50.00
EFL Cup	13 August 2024	27 August 2024	First round	Second round	2	1	0	1	7	3	+4	50.00
Total					50	21	9	20	61	53	+8	42.00

Source: Soccerway

=== Championship ===
==== League table ====
Pos	Team	Pld	W	D	L	GF	GA	GD	Pts	Promotion, qualification or relegation
5	Coventry City	46	20	9	17	64	58	+6	69	Qualified for the Championship play-offs
6	Bristol City	46	17	17	12	59	55	+4	68	Qualified for the Championship play-offs
7	Blackburn Rovers	46	19	9	18	53	48	+5	66	
8	Millwall	46	18	12	16	47	49	−2	66	
9	West Bromwich Albion	46	15	19	12	57	47	+10	64	

Source: English Football League
Rules for classification: 1) Points; 2) Goal difference; 3) Number of goals scored; 4) Head-to-head results; 5) Wins; 6) Away goals; 7) Penalty points (sec 9.5); 8) Number of 12-point sending off offences; 9) Play-off (only if needed to determine promotion/relegation)

==== Results summary ====
Overall								Home						Away					
Pld	W	D	L	GF	GA	GD	Pts	W	D	L	GF	GA	GD	W	D	L	GF	GA	GD
46	19	9	18	53	48	+5	66	12	4	7	34	23	+11	7	5	11	19	25	−6

Source: Soccerway

==== Results by round ====
Round	1	2	3	4	5	6	7	8	9	10	11	12	13	14	15	17	18	19	20	21	22	23	24	25	26	16^{1}	27	28	29	30	31	32	33	34	35	36	37	38	39	40	41	42	43	44	45	46
Ground	H	A	H	A	H	A	H	A	A	H	H	A	H	H	A	A	H	A	A	H	A	H	H	A	H	H	A	H	A	H	A	A	H	A	H	A	A	H	A	H	H	A	H	A	H	A
Result	W	D	W	D	W	D	W	L	L	W	D	L	L	L	W	W	W	W	W	W	L	D	L	D	L	W	L	L	L	W	L	W	W	L	D	L	L	L	L	L	D	W	W	W	W	D
Position	3	4	3	5	3	4	3	6	8	6	6	6	8	10	9	8	8	6	5	5	5	5	5	7	7	5	5	6	7	5	6	5	5	6	7	8	9	9	11	12	12	10	10	9	8	7
Points	3	4	7	8	11	12	15	15	15	18	19	19	19	19	22	25	28	31	34	37	37	38	38	39	39	42	42	42	42	45	45	48	51	51	52	52	52	52	52	52	53	56	59	62	65	66

Source: EFL
A = Away; H = Home; W = Win; D = Draw; L = Loss; P = Postponed
Notes:
- ^{1} Matchday 16 (vs. Portsmouth) was postponed due to a waterlogged pitch.

==== Matches ====
The league fixtures were announced on 26 June 2024.

Win Draw Loss Fixtures

9 August 2024 1	Blackburn Rovers	4–2	Derby County	Blackburn
20:00 BST	Dolan 19', (yellow card) 87'; Weimann 72'; Szmodics 76'; Ohashi 84'	Report	Barkhuizen (yellow card) 11'; Nelson 67'; Collins (yellow card) 82'; Wilson 88'; Cashin (yellow card) 90'	Stadium: Ewood Park; Attendance: 17,975; Referee: Josh Smith

17 August 2024 2	Norwich City	2–2	Blackburn Rovers	Norwich
15:00 BST	Stacey (yellow card) 27'; Doyle (yellow card) 45+1'; Sargent 65'; Sainz 73'	Report	Hedges 20'; Travis (yellow card) 45+3'; Dolan (yellow card) 68'; Carter (yellow card) 78'; Ohashi 87'	Stadium: Carrow Road; Attendance: 26,400; Referee: James Bell

24 August 2024 3	Blackburn Rovers	2–1	Oxford United	Blackburn
15:00 BST	Tronstad (yellow card) 37'; Rankin-Costello 45+2'; Travis (yellow card) 77'; Sigurðsson 83'	Report	Harris 44'; Kioso (yellow card) 57'	Stadium: Ewood Park; Attendance: 14,769; Referee: Lewis Smith

31 August 2024 4	Burnley	1–1	Blackburn Rovers	Burnley
12:30 BST	Foster 10', (yellow card) 76'; Mejbri (yellow card) 42'; Koleosho (yellow card) 67'; Egan-Riley (yellow card) 90+6'	Report	Weimann 23'; Gueye (yellow card) 31' (yellow-red card) 57'; Travis (yellow card) 34'; Brittain (yellow card) 49'; Carter (yellow card) 53'; Hedges (yellow card) 66'; Pears (yellow card) 90+5'	Stadium: Turf Moor; Attendance: 21,042; Referee: Tony Harrington
Note: Fixture was initially scheduled for a 15:00 kick-off, but was moved for live Sky Sports broadcast.

14 September 2024 5	Blackburn Rovers	3–0	Bristol City	Blackburn
15:00 BST	Travis 17'; Ohashi 55', 70'	Report	McNally (yellow card) 11'; Sykes (yellow card) 44'; Mehmeti (yellow card) 74'; Roberts (yellow card) 79'	Stadium: Ewood Park; Attendance: 14,087; Referee: Stephen Martin

22 September 2024 6	Preston North End	0–0	Blackburn Rovers	Preston
12:00 BST	Whiteman (yellow card) 26'; Greenwood (red card) 42'; Hughes (yellow card) 47'; Osmajić (yellow card) 89'; Potts (yellow card) 90+4'	Report	Carter (yellow card) 7'; Tronstad (yellow card) 61'; Cantwell (yellow card) 85'; Weimann (yellow card) 86'; Beck (red card) 89'; Pickering (yellow card) 90+5'	Stadium: Deepdale; Attendance: 20,945; Referee: Matt Donohue
Note: Fixture was initially scheduled for 21 September, but was moved for live Sky Sports broadcast.

28 September 2024 7	Blackburn Rovers	2–0	Queens Park Rangers	Blackburn
12:30 BST	Hedges (yellow card) 9'; Travis (yellow card) 38', (goal) 52'; Batth 63'; Dolan (yellow card) 88'	Report	Santos (yellow card) 35'; Varane (red card) 45+2'; Cook (yellow card) 59'	Stadium: Ewood Park; Referee: Craig Pawson

1 October 2024 8	Coventry City	3–0	Blackburn Rovers	Coventry
19:45 GMT	Bidwell 11'; Wright 48'; Sheaf (yellow card) 58'; Thomas-Asante 84'	Report	Cantwell (yellow card) 60'; Carter (yellow card) 67'; Buckley (yellow card) 81'	Stadium: Coventry Building Society Arena; Attendance: 24,583; Referee: John Busby

5 October 2024 9	Plymouth Argyle	2–1	Blackburn Rovers	Plymouth
15:00 GMT	Obafemi 15'; Randell (yellow card) 67'; Houghton (yellow card) 88'; Whittaker 90+7', (yellow card) 90+8'; Mumba (yellow card) 90+8'	Report	Hyam (yellow card) 22'; Dolan (yellow card) 49'; Rankin-Costello 86', (yellow card) 90+9'	Stadium: Home Park; Attendance: 16,635; Referee: James Linington

19 October 2024 10	Blackburn Rovers	1–0	Swansea City	Blackburn
15:00 GMT	Dolan 13'; Beck (yellow card) 60'	Report	Franco (yellow card) 8'; Key (yellow card) 41'	Stadium: Ewood Park; Attendance: 13,550; Referee: David Webb

23 October 2024 11	Blackburn Rovers	0–0	West Bromwich Albion	Blackburn
19:45 GMT	Cantwell (yellow card) 71'	Report	Mowatt (yellow card) 67'	Stadium: Ewood Park; Attendance: 13,647; Referee: John Busby

26 October 2024 12	Watford	1–0	Blackburn Rovers	Watford
12:30 GMT	Sierralta (yellow card) 36'; Chakvetadze (yellow card) 49'; Kayembe (yellow card) 51' (goal) 71' (pen.); Baah (yellow card) 55'; Ebosele (yellow card) 88'	Report	Cantwell (yellow card) 68'; Batth (yellow card) 69'; Brittain (yellow card) 90'; Hyam (yellow card) 90+5'	Stadium: Vicarage Road; Attendance: Darren England; Referee: 18,880
Note: Fixture was initially scheduled for a 15:00 kick-off, but was moved for live Sky Sports broadcast.

2 November 2024 13	Blackburn Rovers	0–2	Sheffield United	Blackburn
12:30 GMT	Gueye (yellow card) 75'	Report	Burrows 16'; Robinson (yellow card) 43'; O'Hare (yellow card) 50'; Campbell 64'	Stadium: Ewood Park; Attendance: 16,810; Referee: Oliver Langford
Note: Fixture was initially scheduled for a 15: 00 kick-off, but was moved for live Sky Sports broadcast.

6 November 2024 14	Blackburn Rovers	0–2	Stoke City	Blackburn
19:45 GMT	Dolan (yellow card) 49'	Report	Manhoef 57'; Burger (yellow card) 67'; Tchamadeu (yellow card) 79'; Cannon 85'	Stadium: Ewood Park; Attendance: 13,144; Referee: Andy Davies

9 November 2024 15	Cardiff City	1–3	Blackburn Rovers	Cardiff
12:30 GMT	Turnbull 73'	Report	Weimann 15', 54'; Pears (yellow card) 37'; Rankin-Costello (yellow card) 72'; Baker 86'; Buckley (yellow card) 90+4'	Stadium: Cardiff City Stadium; Referee: Gavin Ward
Note: Fixture was initially scheduled for a 15:00 kick-off, but was moved for live Sky Sports broadcast.

27 November 2024 17	Middlesbrough	0–1	Blackburn Rovers	Middlesbrough
19:45 GMT	McGree (yellow card) 13'	Report	Hyam 77'	Stadium: Riverside Stadium; Attendance: 22,751; Referee: James Bell

30 November 2024 18	Blackburn Rovers	1–0	Leeds United	Blackburn
13:30 GMT	Cantwell 22'; Travis (yellow card) 54'; Dolan (yellow card) 62'	Report	Bogle (yellow card) 23'; Ramazani (yellow card) 73'	Stadium: Ewood Park; Attendance: 21,942; Referee: Lewis Smith
Note: Fixture was initially scheduled for a 15:00 kick-off, but was moved on Police advice.

7 December 2024 19	Hull City	0–1	Blackburn Rovers	Kingston upon Hull
15:00 GMT	Hughes (yellow card) 69'; Alzate (yellow card) 84'	Report	McLoughlin 20' (o.g.); Ohashi (yellow card) 70'; Beck (yellow card) 77'; Gueye (yellow card) 90+1'; Rankin-Costello (yellow card) 90+6'	Stadium: MKM Stadium; Attendance: 20,544; Referee: Thomas Kirk

10 December 2024 20	Sheffield Wednesday	0–1	Blackburn Rovers	Owlerton
19:45 GMT		Report	Gueye 68'; Cantwell (yellow card) 84'; Travis (yellow card) 90+4'	Stadium: Hillsborough Stadium; Attendance: 22,703; Referee: Josh Smith

14 December 2024 21	Blackburn Rovers	2–0	Luton Town	Blackburn
15:00 GMT	Pickering (yellow card) 1'; Cozier-Duberry 32'; Beck 40'; Gueye (yellow card) 52'; Rankin-Costello (yellow card) 61'	Report	Clark (yellow card) 3'; Brown (yellow card) 60'; Walsh (red card) 73'	Stadium: Ewood Park; Attendance: 13,857; Referee: Michael Salisbury

21 December 2024 22	Millwall	1–0	Blackburn Rovers	Bermondsey
15:00 GMT	Ivanović 90+6'	Report	Travis (yellow card) 6'; Gueye (yellow card) 90+1'	Stadium: The Den; Attendance: 14,009; Referee: David Webb

26 December 2024 23	Blackburn Rovers	2–2	Sunderland	Blackburn
15:00 GMT	Ohashi 13', (yellow card) 29'; Hyam (yellow card) 58'; Leonard 90'	Report	Hume (yellow card) 33'; Rigg 51'; Isidor 55'; O'Nien (yellow card) 83'; Roberts (yellow card) 90+3'	Stadium: Ewood Park; Attendance: 24,961; Referee: Robert Madley

29 December 2024 24	Blackburn Rovers	0–1	Hull City	Blackburn
15:00 GMT	Baker (yellow card) 69'; Beck (yellow card) 80'; Buckley (yellow card) 81'	Report	Longman 77'	Stadium: Ewood Park; Attendance: 16,245; Referee: Dean Whitestone

1 January 2025 25	Leeds United	1–1	Blackburn Rovers	Leeds
15:00 GMT	Struijk 88' (pen.); Tanaka (yellow card) 90+6'; Aaronson (yellow card) 90+7'	Report	Baker (yellow card) 40'; Batth 90', (yellow card) 90+10'; Pears (yellow card) 90+11'	Stadium: Elland Road; Attendance: 36,645; Referee: Oliver Langford

4 January 2025 26	Blackburn Rovers	0–1	Burnley	Blackburn
12:30 GMT	Batth (yellow card) 32'; Hyam (yellow card) 54'	Report	Laurent (yellow card) 40'; Flemming 60'; Cullen (yellow card) 87'	Stadium: Ewood Park; Attendance: 25,909; Referee: Andrew Kitchen
Note: Fixture was initially scheduled for a 15:00 kick-off, but was moved for live Sky Sports broadcast.

15 January 2025 16	Blackburn Rovers	3–0	Portsmouth	Blackburn
19:45 GMT	Tronstad (yellow card) 50'; Gueye 61'; Brittain 71'; Weimann 76'	Report	Potts (yellow card) 19'; Murphy (yellow card) 81'; Devlin (yellow card) 87'	Stadium: Ewood Park; Attendance: 13,703; Referee: Farai Hallam
Note: Fixture was originally scheduled for 23 November, but was postponed due to a waterlogged pitch.

18 January 2025 27	Oxford United	1–0	Blackburn Rovers	Oxford
15:00 GMT	Helik (yellow card) 21'; Brannagan 67'	Report	Gueye (yellow card) 33'; Cantwell (yellow card) 53'; Brittain (yellow card) 65'	Stadium: Kassam Stadium; Attendance: 11,407; Referee: Will Finnie

21 January 2025 28	Blackburn Rovers	0–2	Coventry City	Blackburn
19:45 GMT		Report	Binks (yellow card) 37'; Simms 41'; Thomas-Asante 78'	Stadium: Ewood Park; Attendance: 12,819; Referee: Oliver Langford

25 January 2025 29	Bristol City	2–1	Blackburn Rovers	Ashton Gate
15:00 GMT	Twine 12'; Wells 77'; O'Leary (yellow card) 90+3'	Report	Batth (yellow card) 11'; Sanderson (yellow card) 14'; Gueye (yellow card) 24'; Weimann 40'; Dolan (yellow card) 61'	Stadium: Ashton Gate; Attendance: 20,945; Referee: Matt Donohue

31 January 2025 30	Blackburn Rovers	2–1	Preston North End	Blackburn
20:00 GMT	Gueye 40'; Buckley (yellow card) 63'; Cantwell 78' (pen.)	Report	Potts 90+3'	Stadium: Ewood Park; Referee: Joshua Smith
Note: Fixture was initially scheduled for 1 February, but was moved for live Sky Sports broadcasting.

4 February 2025 31	Queens Park Rangers	2–1	Blackburn Rovers	Shepherd's Bush
19:45 GMT	Frey 5'; Colback 76'	Report	Dolan 53'	Stadium: Loftus Road; Attendance: 13,571; Referee: James Linington
Note: Fixture was initially scheduled for 8 February, but was moved due to FA Cup involvements.

12 February 2025 32	West Bromwich Albion	0–2	Blackburn Rovers	West Bromwich
20:00 GMT		Report	Gueye 47', 63'; Dolan (yellow card) 85'	Stadium: The Hawthorns; Attendance: 23,305; Referee: David Webb
Note: Fixture was initially scheduled for a 19:45 kick-off, but was pushed back fifteen minutes.

15 February 2025 33	Blackburn Rovers	2–0	Plymouth Argyle	Blackburn
15:00 GMT	Forshaw 55'; Dolan 78'	Report	Talovyerov (yellow card) 12'; Randell (yellow card) 83'	Stadium: Ewood Park; Attendance: 14,875; Referee: Sam Allison

22 February 2025 34	Swansea City	3–0	Blackburn Rovers	Landore
15:00 GMT	Vipotnik 39'; Peart-Harris 45+2'; Cullen 62'	Report	Brittain (yellow card) 64'; Dolan (yellow card) 76'	Stadium: Swansea.com Stadium; Attendance: 13,788; Referee: Gavin Ward

1 March 2025 35	Blackburn Rovers	1–1	Norwich City	Blackburn
12:30 GMT	Dennis (yellow card) 67' (yellow-red card) 85'; Weimann 90+6'		Fisher (yellow card) 22'; Crnac 90+1'	Stadium: Ewood Park; Attendance: 14,240; Referee: Leigh Doughty
Note: Fixture was initially scheduled for a 15:00 kick-off, but was moved for live Sky Sports broadcasting.

8 March 2025 36	Derby County	2–1	Blackburn Rovers	Derby
15:00 GMT	Forsyth 3'; Adams 7'; Armstrong (yellow card) 70'; Yates (yellow card) 74'; Clarke (yellow card) 86'	Report	Gueue 40'; Brittain (yellow card) 42'; Tronstad (yellow card) 81'; Carter (yellow card) 84'	Stadium: Pride Park Stadium; Attendance: 29,753; Referee: Andrew Kitchen

12 March 2025 37	Stoke City	1–0	Blackburn Rovers	Stoke-on-Trent
20:00 GMT	Al-Hamadi 19'; Gallagher (yellow card) 82'	Report	Gueye (yellow card) 46'; Travis (yellow card) 78'	Stadium: Bet365 Stadium; Attendance: 20,194; Referee: Farai Hallam
Note: Fixture was initially scheduled for 11 March, but was moved for live Sky Sports broadcasting.

15 March 2025 38	Blackburn Rovers	1–2	Cardiff City	Blackburn
15:00 GMT	Ohashi 16'	Report	Salech 4'; Chambers (yellow card) 13'; Méïté 73'	Stadium: Ewood Park; Attendance: 13,456; Referee: Adam Herczeg

29 March 2025 39	Portsmouth	1–0	Blackburn Rovers	Milton
15:00 GMT	Murphy 20'; Swanson (yellow card) 36'; Poole (yellow card) 37'; Williams (yellow card) 75'; Potts (yellow card) 81'	Report	Dolan (yellow card) 6'; Batth (yellow card) 40'	Stadium: Fratton Park; Attendance: 20,342; Referee: Jeremy Simpson

4 April 2025 40	Blackburn Rovers	0–2	Middlesbrough	Blackburn
20:00 BST	Gueye (yellow card) 23'; Buckley (yellow card) 62'	Report	Conway 2'; Iling-Junior 8'	Stadium: Ewood Park; Attendance: 15,638; Referee: John Busby
Note: Fixture was initially scheduled for 5 April, but was moved for live Sky Sports broadcasting.

8 April 2025 41	Blackburn Rovers	2–2	Sheffield Wednesday	Blackburn
19:45 BST	Hyam (yellow card) 23'; Dolan 51'; Ōhashi (yellow card) 73', (goal) 85'; Travis (yellow card) 82'	Report	Valery 16'; Gassama 38'; Valentín (yellow card) 44'; Ingelsson (yellow card) 71'; Charles (yellow card) 73'; Windass (yellow card) 86'	Stadium: Ewood Park; Attendance: 15,575; Referee: Will Finnie

12 April 2025 42	Luton Town	0–1	Blackburn Rovers	Luton
15:00 BST	Mengi (yellow card) 73'	Report	Travis (yellow card) 27'; Montgomery (yellow card) 47' (yellow-red card) 58'; Ōhashi 52'; Dolan (yellow card) 67'; Tóth (yellow card) 86'	Stadium: Kenilworth Road; Attendance: 11,552; Referee: David Webb

18 April 2025 43	Blackburn Rovers	4–1	Millwall	Blackburn
15:00 BST	Hyam 42'; Tronstad 45+1', 59'; Brittain 50'	Report	Ivanović 44'; Harding (yellow card) 45+1'	Stadium: Ewood Park; Attendance: 14,167; Referee: Lewis Smith

21 April 2025 44	Sunderland	0–1	Blackburn Rovers	Sunderland
15:00 BST	Rigg (yellow card) 82'	Report	Dolan 33'; Hedges (yellow card) 73'; Forshaw (yellow card) 82'	Stadium: Stadium of Light; Attendance: 40,031; Referee: James Bell

26 April 2025 45	Blackburn Rovers	2–1	Watford	Blackburn
15:00 BST	Hedges (yellow card) 34'; Dolan (yellow card) 44', (goal) 74'; Cantwell 59'; Dennis (yellow card) 90+2'; Travis (yellow card) 90+5'; Forshaw (yellow card) 90+7'	Report	Louza (yellow card) 16'; Abankwah (yellow card) 24'; Morris (yellow card) 46'; Pollock 47'; Doumbia (yellow card) 65'; Kayembe (yellow card) 85'	Stadium: Ewood Park; Attendance: 15,154; Referee: Elliot Bell

3 May 2025 46	Sheffield United	1–1	Blackburn Rovers	Sheffield
12:30 BST	Holding (yellow card) 57'; Ahmedhodžić 59'; Davies (yellow card) 78'	Report	Ōhashi 50'	Stadium: Bramall Lane; Attendance: 30,556; Referee: Farai Hallam

=== FA Cup ===
Blackburn Rovers entered the FA Cup at the third round stage, and were drawn away against Middlesbrough. In the fourth round, they were drawn at home against Wolverhampton Wanderers.

Win Draw Loss Fixtures

11 January 2025 Third round	Middlesbrough	0–1	Blackburn Rovers	Middlesbrough
12:00 GMT	McCabe (yellow card) 47'	Report	Weimann 70'	Stadium: Riverside Stadium; Attendance: 16,794; Referee: Dean Whitestone

9 February 2025 Fourth round	Blackburn Rovers	0–2	Wolverhampton Wanderers	Blackburn
12:30 GMT	Buckley (yellow card) 16'; Kargbo (yellow card) 26'	Report	Bueno (yellow card) 17'; João Gomes 33'; Cunha 34'	Stadium: Ewood Park; Attendance: 15,141; Referee: Lewis Smith

=== EFL Cup ===
As an EFL Championship side, Blackburn entered the EFL Cup in the first round, where they were drawn away to League One side Stockport County on 27 June. In the second round, they were drawn at home to Blackpool on 14 August.

Win Draw Loss Fixtures

13 August 2024 First round	Stockport County	1–6	Blackburn Rovers	Stockport
19:30 BST	Cina (yellow card) 47'; Buckley 67' (o.g.); Bailey (yellow card) 90+2'	Report	Szmodics 8', 25'; Weimann 22'; Ohashi 31'; Gueye 72'; Vale 88'	Stadium: Edgeley Park; Attendance: 5,790; Referee: Ross Joyce

27 August 2024 Second round	Blackburn Rovers	1–2	Blackpool	Blackburn
19:45 BST	Gueye 21' (pen.); Vale (yellow card) 40'	Report	Casey (yellow card) 20'; Beesley 72'; Apter (yellow card) 75'; Coulson 77'	Stadium: Ewood Park; Attendance: 9,418; Referee: Anthony Backhouse

== Statistics ==
=== Appearances ===
Players with no appearances are not included on the list

No.	Pos	Nat	Player	Total		Championship		FA Cup		EFL Cup	
No.	Pos	Nat	Player	Apps	Goals	Apps	Goals	Apps	Goals	Apps	Goals
1	GK	(England) ENG	Aynsley Pears	42	0	40+0	0	0+0	0	2+0	0
2	DF	(England) ENG	Callum Brittain	35	2	30+3	2	1+0	0	1+0	0
3	DF	(England) ENG	Harry Pickering	17	0	12+3	0	0+0	0	2+0	0
4	DF	(Portugal) POR	Yuri Ribeiro	16	0	15+0	0	1+0	0	0+0	0
5	DF	(Scotland) SCO	Dominic Hyam	49	2	46+0	2	2+0	0	0+1	0
6	MF	(Norway) NOR	Sondre Tronstad	40	2	36+2	2	1+0	0	1+0	0
8	MF	(England) ENG	Todd Cantwell	39	3	27+10	3	2+0	0	0+0	0
9	FW	(Senegal) SEN	Makhtar Gueye	48	8	23+21	6	0+2	0	1+1	2
10	FW	(England) ENG	Tyrhys Dolan	47	7	40+4	7	0+2	0	0+1	0
11	MF	(England) ENG	Joe Rankin-Costello	32	2	13+16	2	2+0	0	1+0	0
12	GK	(Hungary) HUN	Balázs Tóth	8	0	6+0	0	2+0	0	0+0	0
14	FW	(Austria) AUT	Andreas Weimann	34	9	15+15	7	1+1	1	2+0	1
15	DF	(England) ENG	Danny Batth	41	2	34+3	2	2+0	0	2+0	0
17	DF	(England) ENG	Hayden Carter	18	0	16+0	0	0+0	0	2+0	0
19	FW	(Wales) WAL	Ryan Hedges	44	1	33+9	1	0+1	0	0+1	0
20	FW	(England) ENG	Harry Leonard	10	1	0+9	1	1+0	0	0+0	0
21	MF	(England) ENG	John Buckley	27	0	8+15	0	2+0	0	2+0	0
23	FW	(Japan) JPN	Yūki Ōhashi	38	10	26+10	9	0+0	0	1+1	1
24	DF	(Wales) WAL	Owen Beck	25	1	21+3	1	1+0	0	0+0	0
27	MF	(England) ENG	Lewis Travis	39	2	37+1	2	0+0	0	0+1	0
28	MF	(England) ENG	Adam Forshaw	17	1	5+11	1	1+0	0	0+0	0
29	FW	(Wales) WAL	Jack Vale	2	1	0+0	0	0+0	0	1+1	1
31	DF	(England) ENG	Dion Sanderson	12	0	4+8	0	0+0	0	0+0	0
32	FW	(England) ENG	Igor Tyjon	2	0	0+2	0	0+0	0	0+0	0
33	MF	(England) ENG	Amario Cozier-Duberry	23	1	6+16	1	1+0	0	0+0	0
39	DF	(United States) USA	Leo Duru	3	0	0+1	0	0+0	0	1+1	0
41	MF	(England) ENG	Harley O'Grady-Macken	1	0	0+0	0	0+1	0	0+0	0
42	FW	(Nigeria) NGR	Emmanuel Dennis	7	0	1+5	0	1+0	0	0+0	0
45	FW	(England) ENG	Cauley Woodrow	10	0	2+7	0	0+1	0	0+0	0
47	FW	(Sierra Leone) SLE	Augustus Kargbo	9	0	2+6	0	1+0	0	0+0	0
51	MF	(Scotland) SCO	Kristi Montgomery	3	0	1+2	0	0+0	0	0+0	0
Player(s) who featured whilst on loan but returned to parent club during the season:
42	MF	(England) ENG	Lewis Baker	13	1	7+6	1	0+0	0	0+0	0
Player(s) who featured but departed the club permanently during the season:
4	DF	(England) ENG	Kyle McFadzean	3	0	0+1	0	0+0	0	0+2	0
7	FW	(Iceland) ISL	Arnór Sigurðsson	7	1	0+5	1	0+0	0	2+0	0
8	MF	(Republic of Ireland) IRL	Sammie Szmodics	2	3	0+1	1	0+0	0	1+0	2

=== Goalscorers ===
Rank	No.	Pos.	Name	League	FA Cup	EFL Cup	Total
1	23	FW	(Japan) Yūki Ōhashi	9	0	1	10
2	14	FW	(Austria) Andreas Weimann	7	1	1	9
3	9	FW	(Senegal) Makhtar Gueye	6	0	2	8
4	10	FW	(England) Tyrhys Dolan	7	0	0	7
5	8	MF	(Republic of Ireland) Sammie Szmodics	1	0	2	3
=	8	MF	(England) Todd Cantwell	3	0	0	3
7	2	DF	(England) Callum Brittain	2	0	0	2
=	5	DF	(Scotland) Dominic Hyam	2	0	0	2
=	6	MF	(Norway) Sondre Tronstad	2	0	0	2
=	11	MF	(England) Joe Rankin-Costello	2	0	0	2
=	15	DF	(England) Danny Batth	2	0	0	2
=	27	MF	(England) Lewis Travis	2	0	0	2
13	7	FW	(Iceland) Arnór Sigurðsson	1	0	0	1
=	19	FW	(Wales) Ryan Hedges	1	0	0	1
=	20	FW	(England) Harry Leonard	1	0	0	1
=	24	DF	(Wales) Owen Beck	1	0	0	1
=	28	MF	(England) Adam Forshaw	1	0	0	1
=	29	FW	(Wales) Jack Vale	0	0	1	1
=	33	MF	(England) Amario Cozier-Duberry	1	0	0	1
=	42	MF	(England) Lewis Baker	1	0	0	1
—	—	—	Own goal	1	0	0	1
Total				53	1	7	61

=== Assists ===
Rank	No.	Pos.	Name	League	FA Cup	EFL Cup	Total
1	8	MF	(England) Todd Cantwell	7	0	0	7
2	9	FW	(Senegal) Makhtar Gueye	6	0	0	6
=	10	MF	(England) Tyrhys Dolan	6	0	0	6
4	2	DF	(England) Callum Brittain	5	0	0	5
5	23	FW	(Japan) Yūki Ōhashi	3	0	1	4
6	11	MF	(England) Joe Rankin-Costello	3	0	0	3
7	3	DF	(England) Harry Pickering	1	0	1	2
=	5	DF	(England) Dominic Hyam	2	0	0	2
=	14	FW	(Austria) Andreas Weimann	2	0	0	2
=	19	MF	(Wales) Ryan Hedges	2	0	0	2
=	21	MF	(England) John Buckley	0	0	2	2
12	4	DF	(Portugal) Yuri Ribeiro	1	0	0	1
=	7	FW	(Iceland) Arnór Sigurðsson	0	0	1	1
=	8	MF	(Republic of Ireland) Sammie Szmodics	1	0	0	1
=	17	DF	(England) Hayden Carter	1	0	0	1
=	27	MF	(England) Lewis Travis	1	0	0	1
=	42	FW	(Nigeria) Emmanuel Dennis	1	0	0	1
=	45	FW	(England) Cauley Woodrow	1	0	0	1
=	47	FW	(Sierra Leone) Augustus Kargbo	1	0	0	1
Total				44	0	5	49
