= Dynel Simeu =

English footballer (born 2002)

Personal information
- Full name: Dynel Brown Kembo Simeu
- Date of birth: 13 March 2002 (age 24)
- Place of birth: Cameroon
- Height: 1.86 m (6 ft 1 in)
- Position: Defender

Team information
- Current team: The New Saints
- Number: 16

Youth career
- Chelsea
- 2021–2022: Southampton

Senior career*
Years	Team	Apps	(Gls)
2022–2024	Southampton	0	(0)
2022	→ Carlisle United (loan)	18	(0)
2022–2023	→ Tranmere Rovers (loan)	14	(1)
2023	→ Morecambe (loan)	18	(0)
2024–2025	Teuta	15	(1)
2025–2026	Oldham Athletic	11	(2)
2026–	The New Saints	15	(2)

International career
2018–2019	England U17	4	(0)
2019	England U18	4	(0)
- * Club domestic league appearances and goals as of 06:43, 7 November 2026 (UTC)

Dynel Brown Kembo Simeu (born 13 March 2002) is an English professional footballer who plays as a defender for Cymru Premier club The New Saints.

== Club career ==
After playing youth football with Chelsea and Southampton, Simeu moved on loan to Carlisle United in January 2022.

On 1 September 2022, Simeu joined Tranmere Rovers on a season-long loan. He made his debut for the club in a 2–0 defeat to Leyton Orient, coming on as a substitute for Josh Hawkes in the 70th minute. On 14 October 2022, Simeu scored his first professional goal in a 3–0 victory against Crewe. He was given a red card during Tranmere's 0–2 defeat to AFC Wimbledon on 19 November 2022 for violent conduct after he threw Harry Pell to the floor off the ball.

On 5 January 2023, Simeu joined Morecambe for the remainder of the season after ending his loan spell with Tranmere early.

During an under-21 match against Aston Villa in August 2023, Simeu ruptured his achilles and was reported to be facing an extended spell on the sidelines.

Simeu was released by Southampton at the end of the 2023–24 season, without making a first-team appearance.

On 3 September 2024, he joined Albanian side Teuta.

On 7 November 2025, Simeu joined Oldham Athletic on a short-term contract. On 9 January 2026, he extended his deal until the end of the season. He was released by Oldham at the end of the 2025–26 season.

In June 2026 it was announced he would join Cymru Premier club The New Saints for the 2026–27 season.

== International career ==
Simeu has represented England at under-17 and under-18 level.

== Career statistics ==
As of match played 6 November 2026

Appearances and goals by club, season and competition
Club	Season	League			National Cup (Note: Includes FA Cup, Albanian Cup)		League Cup (Note: Includes League Cup)		Other		Total	
Club	Season	Division	Apps	Goals	Apps	Goals	Apps	Goals	Apps	Goals	Apps	Goals
Southampton	2021–22	Premier League	0	0	0	0	0	0	0	0	0	0
Southampton	2022–23	Premier League	0	0	0	0	0	0	0	0	0	0
Southampton	2023–24	Championship	0	0	0	0	0	0	0	0	0	0
Southampton	Total		0	0	0	0	0	0	0	0	0	0
Carlisle United (loan)	2021–22	League Two	18	0	0	0	0	0	0	0	18	0
Tranmere Rovers (loan)	2022–23	League Two	14	1	1	0	0	0	2 (Note: Appearances in EFL Trophy)	0	17	1
Morecambe (loan)	2022–23	League One	18	0	0	0	0	0	0	0	18	0
Teuta	2024–25	Kategoria Superiore	15	1	1	0	—		—		16	1
Oldham Athletic	2025–26	League Two	11	2	1	0	0	0	1	0	13	2
The New Saints	2026–27	Cymru Premier	15	2	1	0	—		4 (Note: Two appearances in UEFA Champions League, two appearances in UEFA Conference League)	0	20	2
Career total			91	6	4	0	0	0	7	0	102	6
