= Kane Drummond =

English footballer (born 2000)

Personal information
- Full name: Kane Omar Earl Drummond
- Date of birth: 19 December 2000 (age 25)
- Position: Forward

Team information
- Current team: Oldham Athletic
- Number: 15

Youth career
- –2017: Liverpool
- 2017–2019: Robbie Fowler Academy

Senior career*
Years	Team	Apps	(Gls)
2019–2022	Warrington Rylands		
2022–2024	Macclesfield	50	(18)
2024–2025	Chesterfield	14	(1)
2024	→ Oldham Athletic (loan)	7	(0)
2025–	Oldham Athletic	40	(7)
- * Club domestic league appearances and goals as of 17:02, 4 May 2026 (UTC)

Kane Omar Earl Drummond (born 19 December 2000) is an English professional footballer who plays for Oldham Athletic.

Drummond formerly played non-league football for Warrington Rylands and Macclesfield, winning the FA Vase with the former, before signing for Chesterfield in summer 2024. Following his release from The Spireites, Drummond signed for Oldham Athletic permanently in summer 2025.

== Career ==
=== Early career ===
Drummond grew up in Toxteth, Liverpool. He played for Liverpool's academy before being released aged 16, and subsequently joined the Robbie Fowler Academy. He won the English Colleges Championship and Dubai International Super Cup whilst at the Robbie Fowler Academy.

=== Warrington Rylands ===
Drummond joined North West Counties Football League Premier Division club Warrington Rylands in summer 2019. He was awarded the division's player of the month award for December 2019, having scored thrice in five games. With Drummond having already scored 10 goals for the club, it was announced that he had agreed a contract on 21 January 2020, becoming the first contracted player in the club's history.

Despite the season being curtailed due to the COVID-19 pandemic, Rylands were promoted to the Northern Premier League Division One West at the end of the season due to a restructuring of the non-league pyramid. Rylands were also successful in the 2020–21 FA Vase reaching the final after a 2–1 semi-final win over Walsall Wood, with Drummond scoring the first of the two Warrington goals. Drummond played all 90 minutes of the final as Warrington defeated Binfield 3–2.

Drummond scored 18 goals over the course of the 2021–22 season as Rylands were promoted to the Premier Division as champions at the end of the season. He was named Northern Premier League West Division player of the season, as well as being named in the divisional team of the year.

=== Macclesfield ===
On 15 November 2022, it was announced that Drummond had signed for Northern Premier League Division One West leaders Macclesfield for an undisclosed fee. Drummond won Division One West for the second consecutive season in 2022–23.

At the end of the 2023–24 season, he was named in the Premier Division's team of the season.

=== Chesterfield ===
On 9 May 2024, Drummond signed for newly promoted EFL League Two club Chesterfield on a one-year deal, after rejecting a new contract from Macclesfield. He made his debut as an 85th-minute substitute in a 1–1 draw with Swindon Town in the opening game of the season.

=== Oldham Athletic ===
On 4 October 2024, Drummond joined National League side Oldham Athletic on loan until 5 January 2025.

He returned to Oldham in June 2025, this time on a permanent basis, signing a one-year deal. He had a one-year contract extension triggered at the end of the 2025–26 season.

== Personal life ==
In 2025, Drummond was convicted of grievous bodily harm, receiving a suspended sentence and being ordered to complete 200 hours of community service following a violent incident on a night-out in Liverpool in December 2022. He had previously received a referral order, following a conviction for battery in his youth. Having failed to complete any of his community service, he returned to court in April 2026, receiving a fine of £50 having shown "an increased level of motivation" after being warned he may be sent to prison.

== Career statistics ==
As of end of 2025–26 season

Appearances and goals by club, season and competition
Club	Season	League			FA Cup		EFL Cup		Other		Total	
Club	Season	Division	Apps	Goals	Apps	Goals	Apps	Goals	Apps	Goals	Apps	Goals
Macclesfield	2022–23	Northern Premier League Division One West	17	2	0	0	—		1 (Note: Appearance(s) in Cheshire Senior Cup)	0	18	2
Macclesfield	2023–24	Northern Premier League Premier Division	31	14	0	0	—		10 (Note: Seven appearances and three goals in FA Trophy, one appearance in Cheshire Senior Cup, two appearances and two goals in Northern Premier League Premier Division play-offs)	5	41	19
Macclesfield	Total		48	16	0	0	0	0	11	5	59	21
Chesterfield	2024–25	League Two	14	1	0	0	1	0	4 (Note: Appearance(s) in EFL Trophy)	0	19	1
Oldham Athletic (loan)	2024–25	National League	7	0	3	0	—		0	0	10	0
Oldham Athletic	2025–26	League Two	40	7	2	0	1	0	2	1	45	8
Oldham Athletic	Total		47	7	5	0	1	0	2	1	55	8
Career total			109	24	5	0	2	0	17	5	133	30

== Honours ==
Warrington Rylands

- Northern Premier League Division One West: 2021–22
- FA Vase: 2020–21

Macclesfield

- Northern Premier League Division One West: 2022–23
