= Joe Quigley =

Footballer (born 1996)

Personal information
- Full name: Joseph Richard Quigley
- Date of birth: 10 December 1996 (age 29)
- Place of birth: Hayes, England
- Height: 6 ft 4 in (1.93 m)
- Position: Forward

Team information
- Current team: Bristol Rovers
- Number: 9

Youth career
- 2007–2015: AFC Bournemouth

Senior career*
Years	Team	Apps	(Gls)
2015–2018	AFC Bournemouth	0	(0)
2015	→ Poole Town (loan)	23	(5)
2015	→ Torquay United (loan)	10	(1)
2015	→ Wrexham (loan)	4	(1)
2015–2016	→ Woking (loan)	19	(5)
2016	→ Gillingham (loan)	2	(0)
2017	→ Gillingham (loan)	8	(1)
2017–2018	→ Newport County (loan)	2	(0)
2018	→ Boreham Wood (loan)	9	(1)
2018	Maidstone United	11	(0)
2018–2019	Bromley	6	(1)
2018–2019	→ Eastbourne Borough (loan)	5	(3)
2019	→ Havant & Waterlooville (loan)	15	(2)
2019–2020	Dagenham & Redbridge	30	(5)
2020	→ Billericay Town (loan)	1	(0)
2020–2022	Yeovil Town	54	(16)
2022–2024	Chesterfield	97	(19)
2024–2025	Forest Green Rovers	37	(0)
2025–2026	Oldham Athletic	19	(3)
2026–	Bristol Rovers	17	(3)

International career^{‡}
2017–2018	Republic of Ireland U21	5	(0)
- * Club domestic league appearances and goals as of 10:30, 3 May 2026 (UTC) ‡ National team caps and goals as of 14:41, 27 September 2018 (UTC)

Joseph Richard Quigley (born 10 December 1996) is a professional footballer who plays as a forward for EFL League Two club Bristol Rovers. He was previously at AFC Bournemouth, and has played in the English Football League on loan at Gillingham and Newport County.

== Club career ==
=== AFC Bournemouth ===
Quigley grew up in Lymington and attended Priestlands School. He joined AFC Bournemouth's academy in 2007 when he was eleven and by 2014, he was on his second year scholarship. On 1 April 2015, Quigley was offered a one-year professional contract.

Quigley signed contract extensions with the club on two occasions to stay at with them for the next two years, but he was released by Bournemouth at the end of the 2017–18 season.

==== Loan spells from Bournemouth ====
On 5 January 2015, while still a second-year scholar, Quigley joined Southern League Premier Division side Poole Town on a one-month youth loan. The following day he made his debut, scoring the second goal in 3–0 victory over Sholing. He then scored his second goal for the club, in a 3–1 win over Chippenham Town on 21 January 2015. His loan spell at Poole Town was soon extended "beyond his initial one-month loan", which was confirmed on 3 February 2015. By March, Quigley scored seven goals in 13 appearances for the side. For his performance, he was awarded for the club's Player of the Season. He went on to make eighteen appearances and score eight goals before returning to Bournemouth.

On 6 August 2015, Quigley joined National League side Torquay United on a one-month loan deal along with fellow Bournemouth academy graduate Josh Carmichael. On 8 August 2015, he made his Torquay United debut in a 1–0 victory over Macclesfield Town, in which he played 58 minutes before being replaced by Malachi Lavelle-Moore. On 22 August 2015, Quigley scored his first goal for Torquay in a 2–2 draw with Grimsby Town. On 23 September 2015, after only scoring once in ten league games, Torquay decided to not extend the loan spell.

On 1 October 2015, Quigley joined National League side Wrexham on a one-month loan deal. Two days later, on 3 October 2015, he made his debut in a 3–2 defeat to Chester, playing 70 minutes before getting replaced by Mark Carrington. On 6 October 2015, Quigley scored his first goal for the Dragons in a 2–2 draw against Tranmere Rovers, in which he played 28 minutes after replacing Mark Carrington. Despite making an impression for the side, Quigley returned to his parent club after spending one month at Wrexham, where he made four appearances and scoring once for them.

On 16 November 2015, Quigley joined his third National League side of the 2015–16 campaign, signing for struggling Woking on a one-month loan spell. Five days later, on 21 November 2015, he made his Woking debut in a surprise 2–1 victory over Chester, in which he set up Dan Holman to score. On 24 November 2015, Quigley continued his good start to his Woking career by scoring the fourth goal in a 4–1 victory over Tranmere Rovers. He then scored two goals in two matches between 5 December 2015 and 19 December 2015 against Lincoln City and Gateshead. He did again when he scored two goals in two matches between 2 January 2016 and 9 January 2016 against Aldershot Town and Wrexham. Having not featured since late–March, Quigley remained at the club for the rest of the season, though he returned to the reserve side and went on to make nineteen appearances and scoring five times for the side.

On 7 July 2016, Quigley joined League One side Gillingham on loan until the end of January 2017. On 6 August 2016, Quigley made his Gillingham debut in a 3–1 victory over Southend United, replacing Jay Emmanuel-Thomas with three minutes remaining. On 17 August 2016, it was confirmed that Quigley had suffered an anterior cruciate ligament tear to his knee, therefore he returned to Bournemouth. Five months later, on 31 January 2017, Quigley re-joined Gillingham on a loan deal for the remainder of the 2016–17 campaign. On 25 February 2017, Quigley made his first appearance since his long-term injury, in Gillingham's 2–1 home victory over Southend United, featuring for the full 90 minutes. On 8 April 2017, Quigley scored his first goal for Gillingham, netting in their 1–1 draw with Millwall. He went on to make eleven appearances and scoring once in all competitions.

On 18 August 2017, Quigley joined Newport County on loan until January 2018. He made his debut in the starting line up the following day in a 1–0 win over Coventry City. However, his time at Newport County saw him struggling in the first team and spent until the end of the year, fighting for his place. Having made five appearances for Newport County by January, he returned to his parent club.

On 9 January 2018, Quigley returned to the National League, to join Boreham Wood on loan for the remainder of the campaign. On the same day, he made his debut during their 3–2 away victory over Dagenham & Redbridge, featuring for 80 minutes before being replaced by Shaun Jeffers. He then scored his first goal for Boreham Wood on 27 January 2018, in a 3–0 win over Ebbsfleet United. For the rest of the season, Quigley found himself, fighting for his first team place at the club. Despite this, he appeared as a substitute in number of matches in the play–offs but lost 2–1 in the play-offs final against Tranmere Rovers on 12 May 2018. Although the club was unsuccessful in the play-offs, Quigley went on to make twelve appearances and scoring once in all competitions.

=== Maidstone United ===
After being released by Bournemouth, Quigley went on to sign a one-year deal with National League side Maidstone United for the 2018–19 campaign.

Quigley made his Maidstone United debut on 4 August 2018, where he started the match, in a 1–1 draw against Hartlepool United. In a follow-up match three days later against Dagenham & Redbridge, he played a vital role when he set up two goals for Blair Turgott, who scored twice, in a 2–1 win.

=== Bromley ===
Following the appointment of Harry Wheeler, Quigley was in turn transfer listed and left Maidstone a month later to join Bromley until the end of the campaign. He played just six times for the Ravens and was loaned out to Eastbourne Borough and Havant & Waterlooville. He was released at the end of the season.

=== Dagenham & Redbridge ===
In July 2019, Quigley joined Dagenham & Redbridge on a two-year deal.

=== Yeovil Town ===
On 13 October 2020, after cancelling his contract with Dagenham & Redbridge Quigley joined fellow National League side Yeovil Town on a contract until the end of the 2020–21 season.

=== Chesterfield ===
On 21 January 2022, Quigley signed a two-and-a-half-year contract with fellow National League side Chesterfield for an undisclosed fee.

=== Forest Green Rovers ===
On 30 August 2024, Quigley returned to the National League, joining Forest Green Rovers for an undisclosed fee.

=== Oldham Athletic ===
On 7 August 2025, Quigley joined newly promoted League Two side Oldham Athletic on a two-year deal.

=== Bristol Rovers ===
On 2 February 2026, Quigley signed for fellow League Two club Bristol Rovers on a two-and-a-half year deal for an undisclosed fee.

== International career ==
Quigley is eligible to play for Republic of Ireland through his grandfather.

On 15 March 2017, Quigley received his first international call-up for the Republic of Ireland U21 squad by manager Noel King for their fixture against Kosovo U21, but remained as an unused sub in their 1–0 victory. On 5 September 2017, Quigley made his international debut for Ireland during their 2019 UEFA European Under-21 Championship qualification fixture against Azerbaijan, replacing Reece Grego-Cox in the 3–1 victory.

== Career statistics ==
As of match played 25 August 2026

Appearances and goals by club, season and competition
Club	Season	League			FA Cup		EFL Cup		Other		Total	
Club	Season	Division	Apps	Goals	Apps	Goals	Apps	Goals	Apps	Goals	Apps	Goals
AFC Bournemouth	2014–15	Championship	0	0	0	0	0	0	—		0	0
AFC Bournemouth	2015–16	Premier League	0	0	0	0	0	0	—		0	0
AFC Bournemouth	2016–17	Premier League	0	0	0	0	0	0	—		0	0
AFC Bournemouth	2017–18	Premier League	0	0	0	0	0	0	—		0	0
AFC Bournemouth	Total		0	0	0	0	0	0	—		0	0
Poole Town (loan)	2014–15	SL Premier Division	23	5	—		—		6 (Note: Five appearances and two goals in Southern League Cup, one appearance in Southern League Premier Division play-offs)	2	29	7
Torquay United (loan)	2015–16	National League	10	1	—		—		—		10	1
Wrexham (loan)	2015–16	National League	4	1	—		—		—		4	1
Woking (loan)	2015–16	National League	19	5	—		—		7 (Note: Four appearances and two goals in FA Trophy, three appearances and two goals in Surrey Senior Cup)	4	26	9
Gillingham (loan)	2016–17	League One	10	1	0	0	1	0	0	0	11	1
Newport County (loan)	2017–18	League Two	2	0	0	0	1	0	2 (Note: Appearances in EFL Trophy)	0	5	0
Boreham Wood (loan)	2017–18	National League	9	1	—		—		7 (Note: Two appearances and one goal in FA Trophy, Two appearances and one goal in Herts Senior Cup, three appearances in National League play-offs)	2	16	3
Maidstone United	2018–19	National League	11	0	0	0	—		0	0	11	0
Bromley	2018–19	National League	6	1	1	0	—		1 (Note: Appearance(s) in FA Trophy)	0	8	1
Eastbourne Borough (loan)	2018–19	National League South	5	3	—		—		—		5	3
Havant & Waterlooville (loan)	2018–19	National League	15	2	—		—		2 (Note: Appearances in Hampshire Senior Cup)	0	17	2
Dagenham & Redbridge	2019–20	National League	30	5	1	0	—		6 (Note: Three appearances and one goal in FA Trophy, three appearances and one goal in Essex Senior Cup)	2	37	7
Billericay Town (loan)	2019–20	National League South	1	0	—		—		—		1	0
Yeovil Town	2020–21	National League	37	10	3	1	—		0	0	40	11
Yeovil Town	2021–22	National League	17	6	4	1	—		1 (Note: Appearance in Somerset Premier Cup)	1	22	8
Yeovil Town	Total		54	16	7	2	—		1	1	62	19
Chesterfield	2021–22	National League	16	1	—		—		1 (Note: Appearance(s) in National League play-offs)	1	17	2
Chesterfield	2022–23	National League	43	7	4	0	—		2	0	49	7
Chesterfield	2023–24	National League	35	11	2	1	—		1	0	38	12
Chesterfield	2024–25	League Two	3	0	0	0	1	0	1	0	5	0
Chesterfield	Total		97	19	6	1	1	0	5	1	109	21
Forest Green Rovers	2024–25	National League	37	0	2	0	—		5 (Note: Three appearances and one goal in National League Cup, one appearance and two goals in FA Trophy, one appearance in National League play-offs)	3	44	3
Oldham Athletic	2025–26	League Two	19	3	2	0	0	0	2	0	23	3
Bristol Rovers	2025–26	League Two	17	3	—		—		—		17	3
Bristol Rovers	2026–27	League Two	1	0	0	0	1	0	1	1	3	1
Bristol Rovers	Total		18	3	0	0	1	0	1	1	20	4
Career total			370	66	19	3	4	0	45	16	437	85

== Honours ==
Chesterfield

- National League: 2023–24
