= Jake Leake =

English footballer (born 2003)

Personal information
- Full name: Jake David Leake
- Date of birth: 20 February 2003 (age 23)
- Position: Left-back

Team information
- Current team: Colchester United

Youth career
- Hull City

Senior career*
Years	Team	Apps	(Gls)
2021–2025	Hull City	0	(0)
2021–2022	→ Boston United (loan)	8	(0)
2023	→ Scunthorpe United (loan)	16	(1)
2023–2024	→ Tranmere Rovers (loan)	6	(0)
2025	→ Oldham Athletic (loan)	16	(0)
2025–2026	Oldham Athletic	10	(2)
2026–	Colchester United	0	(0)
- * Club domestic league appearances and goals as of 18:02, 2 July 2026 (UTC)

Jake David Leake (born 20 February 2003) is an English professional footballer who as a left-back for EFL League Two club Colchester United.

== Career ==
Leake began his career with Hull City, and spent loan spells in non-league at Boston United and Scunthorpe United, before moving on loan to Tranmere Rovers in July 2023.

In January 2025, Leake joined National League side Oldham Athletic on loan for the remainder of the season.

On 30 June 2025, Leake joined Oldham permanently on a free transfer, following their promotion to EFL League Two and the expiry of his Hull contract.

Leake departed Oldham when his contract expired, and on 2 July 2026, signed for fellow League Two club Colchester United.

== Career statistics ==
As of match played 2 May 2026

Appearances and goals by club, season and competition
Club	Season	League			FA Cup		EFL Cup		Other		Total	
Club	Season	Division	Apps	Goals	Apps	Goals	Apps	Goals	Apps	Goals	Apps	Goals
Hull City	2021–22	Championship	0	0	0	0	0	0	0	0	0	0
Hull City	2022–23	Championship	0	0	0	0	0	0	0	0	0	0
Hull City	2023–24	Championship	0	0	0	0	0	0	0	0	0	0
Hull City	2024–25	Championship	0	0	0	0	0	0	0	0	0	0
Hull City	Total		0	0	0	0	0	0	0	0	0	0
Boston United (loan)	2021–22	National League North	8	0	2	0	—		0	0	10	0
Scunthorpe United (loan)	2022–23	National League	16	1	0	0	—		0	0	16	1
Tranmere Rovers (loan)	2023–24	League Two	6	0	0	0	1	0	1 (Note: Appearances in the EFL Trophy)	0	8	0
Oldham Athletic (loan)	2024–25	National League	16	0	0	0	—		0	0	16	0
Oldham Athletic	2025–26	League Two	10	2	0	0	0	0	2	0	13	2
Colchester United	2026–27	League Two	0	0	0	0	0	0	0	0	0	0
Career totals			56	3	2	0	1	0	3	0	63	3
