= Jake Caprice =

English footballer (born 1992)

Personal information
- Full name: Jake Lenox Caprice
- Date of birth: 11 November 1992 (age 33)
- Place of birth: Lambeth, England
- Height: 5 ft 10 in (1.78 m)
- Position: Full-back

Team information
- Current team: Eastleigh

Youth career
- 2004–2012: Crystal Palace

Senior career*
Years	Team	Apps	(Gls)
2011–2012	Crystal Palace	0	(0)
2012–2014	Blackpool	0	(0)
2012–2013	→ Dagenham & Redbridge (loan)	8	(0)
2013	→ St Mirren (loan)	7	(0)
2014	→ Tamworth (loan)	12	(0)
2014–2015	Lincoln City	38	(0)
2015–2017	Woking	89	(0)
2017–2018	Leyton Orient	42	(0)
2018–2020	Tranmere Rovers	81	(0)
2020–2023	Exeter City	123	(2)
2023–2024	Burton Albion	26	(0)
2024–2026	Oldham Athletic	66	(2)
2026–	Eastleigh	0	(0)
- * Club domestic league appearances and goals as of 14:32, 25 September 2026 (UTC)

Jake Lenox Caprice (born 11 November 1992) is an English professional footballer who plays as a full-back for National League club Eastleigh.

== Playing career ==
=== Crystal Palace ===
Caprice joined Crystal Palace in 2004 and progressed through the youth system at the club. In the summer of 2011, he signed his first professional contract on a one-year deal. However, Caprice was released by the club at the end of the season.

=== Blackpool ===
In July 2012, he joined Football League Championship side Blackpool on a one-year contract after being released by Palace.

On 13 November 2012, he joined Football League Two side Dagenham & Redbridge on a one-month loan deal. He made his professional debut on 1 December 2012, in a 2–1 defeat to Torquay United, replacing Michael Spillane as a substitute. On 17 December 2012, his loan was extended for a further month. His loan was extended further on 21 January 2013 for another month until 9 February 2013. It was then once again on 18 February 2013 for another month until 9 March 2013.

On 27 August 2013, Caprice joined St Mirren on loan for the season and he made his debut the same day in a 2–1 defeat after extra-time, against Queen of the South, in the Scottish League Cup. Jake ended his loan spell at St Mirren on 31 December 2013, after making 7 appearances, and returned to Blackpool.

After this, Caprice joined Tamworth on loan until the end of the season on 7 March 2014. Caprice made his Tamworth debut the next day, in a 1–0 win over Aldershot Town. Caprice went on to make twelve appearances for Tamworth and upon returning to his parent club, it announced that Caprice was released by the club after they decided not to offer a new contract.

=== Lincoln City ===
On 1 August 2014, Caprice signed for Lincoln City on a one-year contract. Caprice made his Lincoln City debut, in the opening game of the season, in a 0–0 draw against Kidderminster Harriers.

However, Caprice was soon first-team limited, as a result of Tom Miller playing in Caprice's position at right-back, though he later regained it back. Despite this, Caprice provided an assist for Ben Tomlinson, in a 3–1 win over Nuneaton Town on 9 December 2014. Despite losing 2–0 against Alfreton Town in the first round of FA Trophy on 13 December 2014, Caprice was named "Man of the Match" by local newspaper Lincolnshire Echo, citing "Plenty of energy and attacking intent down the right from the fullback, taking the game to the visitors as the Imps searched for an equaliser."

Though becoming a regular starter for The Imps with thirty-seven appearances, Caprice was released by the club.

=== Woking ===
On 22 June 2015, Caprice signed a pre-contract deal to join National League rivals Woking on 1 July 2015. Caprice was given the number two jersey ahead of the 2015/16 campaign. On 8 August 2015, Caprice made his Woking debut in a 1–0 defeat to Tranmere Rovers, playing 80 minutes before being replaced by Reece Beckles. On 7 June 2016, Caprice was awarded with a new one-year deal preceding his impressive performances towards the end of the 2015–16 campaign. On the opening day of the 2016–17 campaign, Caprice played the full 90 minutes in Woking's 3–1 home defeat to Lincoln City.

=== Leyton Orient ===
On 4 July 2017, preceding his release from Woking, Caprice joined fellow National League side Leyton Orient on a two-year deal. On the opening day of the campaign, he made his debut during their 2–0 away defeat to Sutton United, featuring for the entire 90 minutes. Throughout the course of the 2017–18 campaign, Caprice was a regular in Orient's side, starting all thirty-five league games he appeared in. However, towards the conclusion of the season, Caprice fell out of favour under manager, Justin Edinburgh and failed to feature again following their 1–1 draw with Ebbsfleet United on 10 March 2018.

On 11 May 2018, Caprice was transfer listed by the club after failing to fit in with Justin Edinburgh's plans, with director of football, Martin Ling stating "he is not what Justin requires from a full-back" in an interview with the East London Advertiser.

=== Tranmere Rovers ===
On 28 June 2018, Caprice was signed by newly promoted Tranmere Rovers on a two-year contract. The highlight of Caprice's spell on Merseyside came in the 2019 League Two playoff final at Wembley Stadium when he supplied the cross for Connor Jennings' 119th-minute winner earning Tranmere Rovers promotion to League One.

=== Exeter City ===
On 6 August 2020, Caprice was signed by Exeter City.

=== Burton Albion ===
On 19 July 2023, Caprice joined Burton Albion on a free transfer, signing a one-year deal with the option for a second. He was released at the end of the 2023–24 season.

=== Oldham Athletic ===
On 7 August 2024, Caprice joined National League side Oldham Athletic, reuniting with manager Micky Mellon whom he had played under at Tranmere Rovers.

He departed the club upon the expiry of his contract at the end of the 2025–26 season.

=== Eastleigh ===
On 25 September 2026, Caprice joined National League side Eastleigh.

== Career statistics ==
As of end of 2025–26 season

Appearances and goals by club, season and competition
Club	Season	League			FA Cup		League Cup		Other		Total	
Club	Season	Division	Apps	Goals	Apps	Goals	Apps	Goals	Apps	Goals	Apps	Goals
Crystal Palace	2011–12	Championship	0	0	0	0	0	0	—		0	0
Blackpool	2012–13	Championship	0	0	0	0	0	0	—		0	0
Blackpool	2013–14	Championship	0	0	0	0	0	0	—		0	0
Blackpool	Total		0	0	0	0	0	0	—		0	0
Dagenham & Redbridge (loan)	2012–13	League Two	8	0	—		—		—		8	0
St Mirren (loan)	2013–14	Scottish Premiership	6	0	0	0	1	0	—		7	0
Tamworth (loan)	2013–14	Conference Premier	12	0	—		—		—		12	0
Lincoln City	2014–15	Conference Premier	37	0	0	0	—		1 (Note: Appearances in FA Trophy)	0	38	0
Woking	2015–16	National League	42	0	1	0	—		2	0	45	0
Woking	2016–17	National League	39	0	3	0	—		2	0	44	0
Woking	Total		81	0	4	0	0	0	4	0	89	0
Leyton Orient	2017–18	National League	35	0	3	0	—		4	0	42	0
Tranmere Rovers	2018–19	League Two	41	0	5	0	1	0	6 (Note: 3 appearances in EFL Trophy: 3 appearances in League Two play-offs)	0	53	0
Tranmere Rovers	2019–20	League One	20	0	6	0	0	0	2 (Note: Appearances in EFL Trophy)	0	28	0
Tranmere Rovers	Total		61	0	11	0	1	0	8	0	81	0
Exeter City	2020–21	League Two	34	0	2	0	0	0	3	0	39	0
Exeter City	2021–22	League Two	34	1	2	0	1	0	4	0	41	1
Exeter City	2022–23	League One	37	1	2	0	2	0	2	0	43	1
Exeter City	Total		105	2	6	0	3	0	9	0	123	2
Burton Albion	2023–24	League One	26	0	2	0	1	0	4	0	33	0
Oldham Athletic	2024–25	National League	40	2	3	0	—		2 (Note: One appearance in FA Trophy, one appearance in National League Cup)	0	45	2
Oldham Athletic	2025–26	League Two	26	0	2	0	0	0	1	0	29	0
Oldham Athletic	Total		66	2	5	0	0	0	3	0	74	2
Career total			437	4	32	0	5	0	33	0	507	4

== Honours ==
Tranmere Rovers

- EFL League Two play-offs: 2019

Exeter City

- League Two runner-up: 2021–22

Oldham Athletic

- National League play-offs: 2025
