= Harley O'Grady-Macken =

English association football player (born 2006)

Personal information
- Full name: Harley Paul O'Grady-Macken
- Date of birth: 9 December 2004 (age 21)
- Place of birth: Manchester, England
- Position: Midfielder

Team information
- Current team: Radcliffe
- Number: 24

Youth career
- –2021: Wolverhampton Wanderers
- 2021 – 2025: Blackburn Rovers

Senior career*
Years	Team	Apps	(Gls)
2025 – 2026	Blackburn Rovers	0	(0)
2025 – 2026	→ Oldham Athletic (loan)	0	(0)
2026	→ Radcliffe (loan)	5	(0)
2026–	Radcliffe	0	(0)
- * Club domestic league appearances and goals as of 22:35, 8 May 2026

Harley Paul O'Grady-Macken (born 9 December 2004) is an English professional footballer who plays as a midfielder for Radcliffe.

== Career ==
He came though the academy at Wolverhampton Wanderers prior to joining the Blackburn Rovers academy in 2021. He is described as a box-to-box midfielder and signed his first professional contract with the club in 2023 at the age of 18 years-old. In February 2023, he was promoted to train with the Blackburn first-team squad for the first time. In the 2023–24 pre-season he featured in friendly matches for the first team.

He made his professional debut for Blackburn on 11 January 2025 against Middlesbrough, appearing as a second-half substitute in a 1–0 win in the F.A. Cup.

On 2 September 2025, he joined Oldham Athletic on loan until January 2026.

On 27 March 2026, O'Grady-Macken joined Radcliffe FC on loan until the end of the season.

On 19 May 2026, Blackburn announced that O'Grady-Macken will leave the club when his contract expires on 30 June.

=== Radcliffe ===
On 5 July 2026, O'Grady-Macken joined Radcliffe FC permanently.

== Career statistics ==
As of 14 July 2026

Appearances and goals by club, season and competition
Club	Season	League			FA Cup		EFL Cup		Other		Total	
Club	Season	Division	Apps	Goals	Apps	Goals	Apps	Goals	Apps	Goals	Apps	Goals
Blackburn Rovers	2024-25	Championship	0	0	1	0	0	0	—		1	0
Blackburn Rovers	2025-26	Championship	0	0	0	0	0	0	—		0	0
Blackburn Rovers	Total		0	0	1	0	0	0	—		1	0
Oldham Athletic (loan)	2025-26	League Two	0	0	0	0	0	0	0	0	0	0
Radcliffe (loan)	2025-26	National League North	5	0	0	0	-		0	0	5	0
Radcliffe	2026-27	National League North	0	0	0	0	-		0	0	0	0
Career total			5	0	1	0	0	0	0	0	6	0
