= 2025–26 Oldham Athletic A.F.C. season =

131st season in existence of Oldham Athletic AFC

Oldham Athletic
2025–26 season
- Chairman: Frank Rothwell
- Manager: Micky Mellon
- Stadium: Boundary Park
- League Two: 10th
- FA Cup: Second round
- EFL Cup: Preliminary round
- EFL Trophy: Group stage
- Top goalscorer: League: Mike Fondop (8); All: Michael Mellon (10)

The 2025–26 season was the 131st season in the history of Oldham Athletic Football Club and the club's first season back in EFL League Two since the 2021–22 season following their promotion via the 2024–25 National League play-offs. In addition to the domestic league, the club participated in the FA Cup, the EFL Cup, and the 2025–26 EFL Trophy.

Oldham finished the season 10th in League Two. This was the club's highest finish in the English football league system since relegation from League One at the end of the 2017–18 season.

After a steady start which saw the club in 14th position at the turn of the year, Micky Mellon's side went on a run of ten games without defeat during February and March, conceding only two goals. Ultimately, however, ambitions of reaching the play-offs fell away with four consecutive defeats during April, resulting in a 10th-place finish.

Mellon agreed a new two-year contract in March 2026 to stay with the Latics until the summer of 2028.

On an individual level, the club received several nominations at the EFL end-of-season awards. Mellon was shortlisted for EFL League Two Manager of the Season and Mathew Hudson was named in the EFL League Two Team of the Season, having kept a club record 19 clean sheets during the league season.

== Players ==
=== First Team Squad ===
The following players were contracted to the club at the end of the season:

No	Pos	Nat	Name	Age	Debut	App	Start	Sub	Goal	Yellow card	Red card	Notes
1	GK	(England)	Mathew Hudson	28	18 Mar 2023	141	140	1	0	7	0	
2	DF	(Australia)	Reagan Ogle	27	10 Aug 2024	59	55	4	4	10	0	
3	DF	(England)	Jake Leake	23	21 Jan 2025	28	19	9	2	3	0	
4	MF	(England)	Tom Pett	34	21 Jan 2025	67	64	3	3	7	0	
5	DF	(Montserrat)	Donervon Daniels	32	2 Aug 2025	41	41	0	1	2	0	
6	DF	(Cameroon)	Manny Monthe	31	10 Aug 2024	82	81	1	7	11	0	
7	MF	(England)	Kane Taylor	21	24 Jan 2026	15	6	9	2	0	0	On loan from 13 Jan
8	MF	(England)	Ryan Woods	32	2 Aug 2025	47	46	1	0	7	1	
9	FW	(Cameroon)	Mike Fondop	32	5 Feb 2022	172	104	68	53	23	6	
10	MF	(England)	Tom Conlon	30	13 Jan 2024	67	59	8	0	13	0	Captain
11	MF	(Wales)	Jack Stevens	25	2 Aug 2025	22	16	6	6	2	0	
14	FW	(England)	Joe Garner	38	3 Feb 2024	66	38	28	13	20	0	
15	FW	(England)	Kane Drummond	25	5 Oct 2024	55	31	24	8	5	0	
16	DF	(England)	Will Sutton	24	10 Nov 2020	110	102	8	6	11	0	
17	FW	(Republic of Ireland)	Calum Kavanagh	23	7 Feb 2026	10	9	1	2	2	0	Signed 1 Feb
18	MF	(England)	Kieron Morris	32	2 Aug 2025	10	4	6	1	1	0	
20	DF	(England)	Jake Caprice	34	10 Aug 2024	74	56	18	2	16	0	
21	MF	(England)	Josh Hawkes	27	2 Aug 2025	29	14	15	5	2	0	
22	FW	(Portugal)	Fábio Jaló	20	31 Jan 2026	2	0	2	0	1	0	On loan from 30 Jan
23	FW	(England)	Kian Harratt	24	11 Mar 2025	21	11	10	4	0	0	
24	DF	(Scotland)	Jamie Robson	28	9 Aug 2025	46	45	1	0	9	0	
26	MF	(England)	Kai Payne	21	19 Oct 2024	40	27	13	2	2	0	Season-long loan
27	MF	(Wales)	Oli Hammond	23	23 Jan 2024	50	29	21	0	0	0	
28	FW	(Scotland)	Michael Mellon	22	6 Sep 2025	17	16	1	10	0	0	On loan from 1 Sep
31	GK	(England)	Tom Donaghy	23	5 Feb 2025	15	14	1	0	0	0	
33	DF	(England)	Oliver Howard	17	26 Aug 2025	1	0	1	0	0	0	
38	MF	(Republic of Ireland)	Frankie McMahon-Brown	19	2 May 2026	1	0	1	0	0	0	
39	DF	(England)	Isaac Anderson	16	2 May 2026	1	0	1	0	0	0	
40	DF	(England)	Dynel Simeu	24	11 Nov 2025	13	10	3	2	1	0	Signed 7 Nov

=== Out on loan ===
The following players were contracted but were loaned to other clubs at the end of the season:

No	Pos	Nat	Name	Age	Debut	Apps	Starts	Subs	Goal	Yellow card	Red card	Notes
18	MF	(England)	Kieron Morris	32	2 Aug 2025	10	4	6	1	1	0	At Halifax Town
30	FW	(England)	Billy Waters	32	18 Jan 2025	14	10	4	2	1	0	At Halifax Town
n/a	MF	(England)	Josh Kay	29	17 Aug 2024	27	9	18	1	3	1	At Macclesfield

=== Left the club during the season ===
The following players left the club during the season:

No	Pos	Nat	Name	Age	Debut	Apps	Starts	Subs	Goal	Yellow card	Red card	Notes
7	MF	(Republic of Ireland)	Harry Charsley	30	10 Aug 2024	15	11	4	3	0	1	Transferred 2 Jan
17	FW	(England)	Joe Quigley	30	9 Aug 2025	23	13	10	3	3	0	Transferred 2 Feb
19	MF	(England)	Luke Hannant	33	2 Aug 2025	30	21	9	4	4	0	Transferred 21 Mar
22	DF	(England)	Charlie Olson	22	26 Aug 2025	3	2	1	0	0	0	On loan Aug to Jan
25	MF	(England)	Harley O'Grady-Macken	21	-	0	0	0	0	0	0	On loan Sep to Jan

== Transfers and contracts ==
=== In ===
Date	Pos.	Player	From	Fee	Ref.
1 July 2025 (Note: The transfer was announced on 27 June, and would become official on July 1 once his Walsall contract had expired)	CB	(Montserrat) Donervon Daniels	(England) Walsall	Free	
1 July 2025 (Note: The transfer was announced on 18 June, and would become official on July 1 once his Chesterfield contract had expired)	CF	(England) Kane Drummond	(England) Chesterfield	Free	
1 July 2025 (Note: The transfer was announced on 27 June, and would become official on July 1 once his Gateshead contract had expired)	LM	(England) Luke Hannant	(England) Gateshead	Free	
1 July 2025	LM	(England) Josh Hawkes	(England) Tranmere Rovers	Free	
1 July 2025 (Note: The transfer was announced on 30 June, and would become official on July 1 once his Hull contract had expired)	LB	(England) Jake Leake	(England) Hull City	Free	
1 July 2025 (Note: The transfer was announced on 27 June, and would become official on July 1 once his Tranmere contract had expired)	RM	(England) Kieron Morris	(England) Tranmere Rovers	Free	
1 July 2025 (Note: The transfer was announced on 17 June, and would become official on July 1 once his Cheltenham contract had expired)	CM	(England) Tom Pett	(England) Cheltenham Town	Free	
7 July 2025	LW	(Wales) Jack Stevens	(England) Solihull Moors	Undisclosed	
7 July 2025	CDM	(England) Ryan Woods	(England) Exeter City	Free	
7 August 2025	CF	(Republic of Ireland) Joe Quigley	(England) Forest Green Rovers	Undisclosed	
7 August 2025	LB	(Scotland) Jamie Robson	(England) Forest Green Rovers	Undisclosed	
7 November 2025	CB	(England) Dynel Simeu	(Albania) Teuta	Free	
21 November 2025	CM	(Republic of Ireland) Frankie McMahon-Brown	(England) Burnley	Free	
1 February 2026	CF	(Republic of Ireland) Calum Kavanagh	(England) Bradford City	Undisclosed	

=== Out ===
Date	Pos.	Player	To	Fee	Ref.
17 July 2025	CM	(England) Matt Worthington	(England) Torquay United	Undisclosed	
2 January 2026	CM	(Republic of Ireland) Harry Charsley	(England) Truro City	Free	
2 February 2026	CF	(Republic of Ireland) Joe Quigley	(England) Bristol Rovers	Undisclosed	
21 March 2026	LM	(England) Luke Hannant	(England) Rochdale	Free	

=== Loaned in ===
Date	Pos.	Player	From	Until	Ref.
8 July 2025	CM	(England) Kai Payne	(England) Wigan Athletic	31 May 2026	
11 August 2025	CB	(England) Charlie Olson	(England) Blackburn Rovers	2 January 2026 (Note: On 2 January, Olson was recalled to his parent club Blackburn)	
1 September 2025	CF	(Scotland) Michael Mellon	(England) Burnley	31 May 2026	
2 September 2025	CM	(England) Harley O'Grady-Macken	(England) Blackburn Rovers	31 May 2026	
13 January 2026	CM	(England) Kane Taylor	(England) Aston Villa	31 May 2026	
30 January 2026	LW	(Portugal) Fábio Jaló	(England) Barnsley	31 May 2026	

=== Loaned out ===
Date	Pos.	Player	To	Until	Ref.
4 September 2025	LM	(England) Josh Kay	(England) Macclesfield	31 May 2026	
4 October 2025	SS	(England) Billy Waters	(England) Altrincham	3 January 2026	
21 January 2026	CB	(England) Will Sutton	(England) Solihull Moors	18 February 2026 (Note: On 18 February, Sutton was recalled from his loan at Solihull Moors)	
23 January 2026	CF	(England) Kian Harratt	(England) Brackley Town	25 April 2026	
27 January 2026	RM	(England) Kieron Morris	(England) FC Halifax Town	25 April 2026	
17 February 2026	SS	(England) Billy Waters	(England) FC Halifax Town	25 April 2026	

=== Released / Out of Contract ===
Date	Pos.	Player	Subsequent club	Join date	Ref.
30 June 2025	CM	(England) Dan Gardner	(England) Radcliffe	1 July 2025	
30 June 2025	LB	(England) Mark Kitching	(England) York City	1 July 2025	
30 June 2025	CB	(England) Charlie Raglan	(England) Barrow	1 July 2025	
30 June 2025	LM	(England) Joe Pritchard	(England) Rochdale	10 July 2025	
30 June 2025	CF	(England) Kurt Willoughby	(England) Kidderminster Harriers	10 July 2025	
30 June 2025	LW	(Pakistan) Otis Khan	(Malaysia) Kelantan Red Warrior	12 July 2025	
30 June 2025	CM	(England) Josh Lundstram	(England) Eastleigh	14 July 2025	
30 June 2025	CF	(England) Alex Reid	(England) Hartlepool United	17 July 2025	
30 June 2025	CF	(England) James Norwood	(England) Fleetwood Town	18 July 2025	
30 June 2025	LW	(Nigeria) Jesurun Uchegbulam	(England) Eastbourne Borough	22 July 2025	
30 June 2025	CB	(England) Shaun Hobson			
30 June 2025	RM	(England) Kofi Moore			
30 June 2025	CF	(England) Joe Nuttall			

=== New Contract ===
Date	Pos.	Player	Contract until	Ref.
20 June 2025	GK	(England) Tom Donaghy	30 June 2027	
20 June 2025	GK	(England) Mathew Hudson	30 June 2028	
30 June 2025	CF	(England) Joe Garner	31 December 2025	
30 June 2025	CM	(Wales) Oli Hammond	30 June 2027	
30 June 2025	CB	(England) Will Sutton	30 June 2027	
4 July 2025	CF	(England) Mike Fondop	30 June 2027	
31 December 2025	CF	(England) Joe Garner	30 June 2026	
9 January 2026	CB	(England) Dynel Simeu	30 June 2026	

== Pre-season and friendlies ==
On 13 June, Oldham Athletic announced three pre-season friendlies, against Dundee United, Bradford City and Curzon Ashton.

Win Draw Loss

19 July 2025 Friendly	Dundee United	0–0	Oldham Athletic	Dundee, Scotland
14:00 BST		Report		Stadium: Tannadice Park; Attendance: 3,428 (444 away)

26 July 2025 Friendly	Oldham Athletic	0–1	Bradford City	Oldham
13:00 BST		Report	Humphrys 65'	Stadium: Boundary Park; Attendance: 2,530 (724 away)

29 July 2025 Friendly	Curzon Ashton	Cancelled	Oldham Athletic	Ashton-under-Lyne
19:45 BST				Stadium: Tameside Stadium
Note: Fixture was postponed as a precautionary measure due to a number of injuries and player illnesses.

== Competitions ==
=== Overall record ===
Competition	First match	Last match	Starting round	Final position	Record							
Competition	First match	Last match	Starting round	Final position	Pld	W	D	L	GF	GA	GD	Win %
EFL League Two	2 August 2025	2 May 2026	Matchday 1	10th	46	18	14	14	60	44	+16	39.13
FA Cup	1 November 2025	6 December 2025	First round	Second round	2	1	0	1	4	4	+0	50.00
EFL Cup	5 August 2025	5 August 2025	Preliminary round	Preliminary round	1	0	0	1	1	3	−2	0.00
EFL Trophy	26 August 2025	11 November 2025	Group stage	Group stage	3	0	0	3	5	14	−9	0.00
Total					52	19	14	19	70	65	+5	36.54

Last updated: 2 May 2026
Source: Soccerway

=== EFL League Two ===
==== League table ====
Pos	Team	Pld	W	D	L	GF	GA	GD	Pts
8	Barnet	46	21	13	12	70	53	+17	76
9	Swindon Town	46	22	9	15	70	59	+11	75
10	Oldham Athletic	46	18	14	14	60	44	+16	68
11	Crewe Alexandra	46	19	10	17	64	58	+6	67
12	Colchester United	46	18	12	16	62	49	+13	66

Source: EFL Official Website
Rules for classification: 1) Points; 2) Goal difference; 3) Number of goals scored; 4) Head-to-head results; 5) Wins; 6) Away goals; 7) Penalty points (sec 9.5); 8) 12-point sending off offences

==== Results summary ====
Overall								Home						Away					
Pld	W	D	L	GF	GA	GD	Pts	W	D	L	GF	GA	GD	W	D	L	GF	GA	GD
46	18	14	14	60	44	+16	68	10	8	5	30	18	+12	8	6	9	30	26	+4

Last updated: complete.
Source: Soccerway

==== Results by round ====
Round	1	2	3	4	5	6	7	8	9	10	11	12	13	14	15	16	17	18	19	20	21	22	23	24	27	28	30	31	32	33	34	35	25^{1}	36	37	38	39	26^{2}	40	41	42	43	29^{3}	44	45	46
Ground	A	H	H	A	A	H	A	H	A	H	A	H	A	H	A	H	H	A	H	A	H	A	A	H	H	A	H	A	H	H	A	H	A	A	H	A	H	H	A	A	H	A	A	H	A	H
Result	D	D	L	D	D	L	W	W	W	D	L	D	L	D	W	D	W	L	L	D	W	D	W	D	W	L	L	L	D	W	W	W	D	W	W	W	W	W	L	W	D	L	L	L	L	W
Position	16	16	17	17	18	19	17	14	11	13	15	15	17	17	14	15	15	16	17	16	14	15	14	15	12	14	16	16	16	16	15	14	15	13	13	11	11	9	10	8	9	11	11	11	11	10
Points	1	2	2	3	4	4	7	10	13	14	14	15	15	16	19	20	23	23	23	24	27	28	31	32	35	35	35	35	36	39	42	45	46	49	52	55	58	61	61	64	65	65	65	65	65	68

Source: EFL
A = Away; H = Home; W = Win; D = Draw; L = Loss; P = Postponed
Notes:
- ^{1} Matchday 25 (vs. Bromley) was postponed due to a frozen pitch.
- ^{2} Matchday 26 (vs. Notts County) was postponed due to a frozen pitch.
- ^{3} Matchday 29 (vs. Barrow) was postponed due to a waterlogged pitch.

==== Matches ====
On 26 June the EFL League Two fixtures were revealed.

Win Draw Loss Fixtures

2 August 2025 1	MK Dons	0–0	Oldham Athletic	Denbigh, Milton Keynes
15:00 BST	Sanders (yellow card) 55'	Report	Hannant (yellow card) 74'; Conlon (yellow card) 82'; Fondop (yellow card) 86'	Stadium: Stadium MK; Attendance: 9,384 (1,891); Referee: Matthew Russell

9 August 2025 2	Oldham Athletic	1–1	Colchester United	Oldham, Lancs.
15:00 BST	Hawkes 36'; Conlon (yellow card) 89'	Report	Tucker 8'; Macey (yellow card) 34'	Stadium: Boundary Park; Attendance: 7,799 (371 away); Referee: Craig Hicks

16 August 2025 3	Oldham Athletic	1–2	Swindon Town	Oldham, Lancs.
12:30 BST	Quigley (yellow card) 34'	Report	Snowdon 4'; Nichols 19', (yellow card) 23'; McGregor (yellow card) 50'; Wright (yellow card) 90+2'	Stadium: Boundary Park; Attendance: 6,955 (507 away); Referee: Greg Rollason
Note: Fixture was originally scheduled for a 15:00 kick-off, but was moved live Sky Sports broadcasting.

19 August 2025 4	Bristol Rovers	0–0	Oldham Athletic	Horfield, Bristol
19:45 BST	Sotiriou (yellow card) 30'; Southam-Hales (yellow card) 66'; McEachran (yellow card) 79'	Report	Robson (yellow card) 45+5'; Woods (yellow card) 78'	Stadium: Memorial Stadium; Attendance: 6,706 (446 away); Referee: James Oldham

23 August 2025 5	Fleetwood	1–1	Oldham	Fleetwood, Lancs.
15:00 BST	Evans 12'; Johnson (yellow card) 22'; Potter (yellow card) 87'	Report	Ogle 44'	Stadium: Highbury Stadium; Attendance: 3,682 (1,154 away); Referee: Benjamin Speedie

30 August 2025 6	Oldham Athletic	0–1	Gillingham	Oldham, Lancs.
15:00 BST	Quigley (yellow card) 1'; Hannant (yellow card) 20'; Woods (yellow card) 28'; Robson (yellow card) 89'; Monthé (yellow card) 90+1'	Report	Dack (yellow card) 24'; Gale (yellow card) 55'; Vokes 71'; Gbodé (yellow card) 79'	Stadium: Boundary Park; Attendance: 6,233 (549 away); Referee: Scott Jackson

6 September 2025 7	Cambridge United	0–1	Oldham Athletic	Cambridge
15:00 BST	Purrington (yellow card) 40'; Lavery (yellow card) 80'; Kachunga (yellow card) 82'	Report	Mellon 21'; Hudson (yellow card) 44'; Caprice (yellow card) 78'	Stadium: Abbey Stadium; Attendance: 6,570 (740 away); Referee: Ben Atkinson

13 September 2025 8	Oldham Athletic	1–0	Bromley	Oldham, Lancs.
15:00 BST	Monthé (yellow card) 43'; Fondop (yellow card) 59', (goal) 82'	Report	Cameron (yellow card) 40'	Stadium: Boundary Park; Attendance: 6,714 (122 away); Referee: Richard Eley

20 September 2025 9	Cheltenham Town	0–3	Oldham Athletic	Cheltenham, Glos.
15:00 BST	Jude-Boyd (yellow card) 54'; Willcox (yellow card) 55'; Hutchinson (yellow card) 90+4'	Report	Sutton 38'; Hannant 75' (pen.); Quigley 90'	Stadium: Whaddon Road; Attendance: 3,842 (704 from Oldham); Referee: Paul Tierney

27 September 2025 10	Oldham Athletic	1–1	Barnet	Oldham
12:30 BST	Robson (yellow card) 1'; Woods (yellow card) 45'; Mellon 71' (pen.)	Report	Shelton 5' (pen.), (yellow card) 5'; Hawkins (yellow card) 55'; Kanu (yellow card) 56'	Stadium: Boundary Park; Attendance: 7,333 (175 away); Referee: Sebastian Stockbridge
Note: Fixture was originally scheduled for a 15:00 kick-off, but was moved live Sky Sports broadcasting.

4 October 2025 11	Notts County	3–1	Oldham Athletic	Nottingham
15:00 BST	Daniels 7' (o.g.); Hall 29'; Jatta 49'; Roos (yellow card) 86'	Report	Mellon 54'; Conlon (yellow card) 68'	Stadium: Meadow Lane; Attendance: 11,418 (2,066 away); Referee: Oliver Mackey

11 October 2025 12	Oldham Athletic	0–0	Barrow	Oldham
17:30 BST	Garner (yellow card) 90'	Report	Gordon (yellow card) 75'	Stadium: Boundary Park; Attendance: 7,170 (570 away); Referee: Rob Massey-Ellis
Note: Fixture was originally scheduled for a 15:00 kick-off, but was rescheduled for live Sky Sports broadcasting.

18 October 2025 13	Salford City	1–0	Oldham Athletic	Salford, Lancs.
12:30 BST	Harris (penalty missed) 14'; Udoh 14'; Mnoga (yellow card) 45+5'; Ashley (yellow card) 45+8'; Longelo (yellow card) 84'	Report	Monthé (yellow card) 13'; Sutton (red card) 64'; Caprice (yellow card) 74'	Stadium: Moor Lane; Attendance: 4,006 (1,360 away); Referee: Jacob Miles
Note: Fixture was originally scheduled for a 15:00 kick-off, but was rescheduled for live Sky Sports broadcasting.

25 October 2025 14	Oldham Athletic	2–2	Shrewsbury Town	Oldham
15:00 BST	Pett 51'; Garner (yellow card) 87', (goal) 90+5'	Report	Brook (yellow card) 26'; Scully 46'; Hoole (yellow card) 81'; Stubbs (yellow card) 87'; McDermott 90+1', (yellow card) 90+1'	Stadium: Boundary Park; Attendance: 7,361 (817 away); Referee: Abigail Byrne

8 November 2025 15	Harrogate Town	0–1	Oldham Athletic	Harrogate
15:00 GMT	O'Connor (yellow card) 24'; Evans (yellow card) 90+7'	Report	Monthé 23'; Woods (yellow card) 65' (yellow-red card) 79'; Garner (yellow card) 67'	Stadium: Wetherby Road; Attendance: 4,023; Referee: David Rock

15 November 2025 16	Oldham Athletic	0–0	Crewe Alexandra	Oldham
15:00 GMT	Caprice (yellow card) 45+1'; Payne (yellow card) 81'	Report	Hutchinson (yellow card) 90+5'	Stadium: Boundary Park; Attendance: 8,937 (1,354 away); Referee: Aaron Farmer

22 November 2025 17	Oldham Athletic	3–0	Newport County	Oldham
15:00 GMT	Hannant (yellow card) 39'; Hawkes 53', 89'; Robson (yellow card) 57'; Quigley 75'	Report	Spellman (yellow card) 84'	Stadium: Boundary Park; Attendance: 7,056 (222 away); Referee: Andrew Miller

29 November 2025 18	Accrington Stanley	1–0	Oldham Athletic	Accrington, Lancs.
12:30 GMT	Rawson (yellow card) 21'; Robson 31' (o.g.); Matthews (yellow card) 66'; Madden (yellow card) 88'; Wright (yellow card) 90+3'	Report	Drummond (yellow card) 64'; Caprice (yellow card) 71'	Stadium: Crown Ground; Attendance: 3,031 (1,288 away); Referee: Simon Mather
Note: Fixture was originally scheduled for a 15:00 kick-off, but was rescheduled for live Sky Sports broadcasting.

10 December 2025 19	Oldham Athletic	0–1	Walsall	Oldham
19:45 GMT	Pett (yellow card) 36'; Fondop (yellow card) 77'; Robson (yellow card) 90+5'	Report	Warrington (yellow card) 22'; Kanu 27'; Cox (yellow card) 45'	Stadium: Boundary Park; Attendance: 6,529 (538 away); Referee: Stephen Parkinson
Note: Fixture was initially scheduled for 10 December, but was rescheduled due to Walsall's FA Cup involvements on the preceding Sunday.

13 December 2025 20	Crawley Town	2–2	Oldham Athletic	Crawley
15:00 GMT	Loft 18'; Tshimanga 82'; Flint (yellow card) 90+6'	Report	Mellon 50'; Leake (yellow card) 67'; Stevens 68', (yellow card) 90+3'; Garner (yellow card) 90+5'	Stadium: Broadfield Stadium; Attendance: 3,152 (414 away); Referee: Charles Breakspear

20 December 2025 21	Oldham Athletic	3–1	Tranmere Rovers	Oldham
15:00 GMT	Mellon 31', 47', 61'; Garner (yellow card) 40'; Caprice (yellow card) 49'; Fondop (red card) 68'; Hudson (yellow card) 87'	Report	Turnbull (yellow card) 37'; Whitaker 41'	Stadium: Boundary Park; Attendance: 8,838 (1,792 away); Referee: Martin Coy

26 December 2025 22	Grimsby Town	0–0	Oldham Athletic	Cleethorpes
15:00 GMT	McJannet (yellow card) 90+4'	Report	Garner (yellow card) 50'; Ogle (yellow card) 77'	Stadium: Blundell Park; Attendance: 7,686; Referee: Ross Joyce

29 December 2025 23	Walsall	1–2	Oldham Athletic	Bescot
19:45 GMT	Flint (yellow card) 38'; Kanu 50'; Clarke (yellow card) 87'	Report	Garner 15', (yellow card) 45+2'; Payne (yellow card) 56'; Harratt 90+6'	Stadium: Bescot Stadium; Attendance: 6,704 (836 away); Referee: Oliver Mackey

1 January 2026 24	Oldham Athletic	1–1	Chesterfield	Oldham
15:00 GMT	Drummond 59', (yellow card) 59'; Ogle (yellow card) 66'; Robson (yellow card) 75'; Garner (penalty missed) 90+3'	Report	Lewis 21'; McFadzean (yellow card) 51' (yellow-red card) 90+2'	Stadium: Boundary Park; Attendance: 8,853 (1,440 away); Referee: Sam Allison

17 January 2026 27	Oldham Athletic	2–1	Cheltenham Town	Oldham
15:00 GMT	Garner 45'; Payne 60'; Woods (yellow card) 73'; Quigley (yellow card) 83'; Hawkes (yellow card) 85'; Caprice (yellow card) 90+1'	Report	Thomas 26' (pen.); Kinsella (yellow card) 90+5'	Stadium: Boundary Park; Attendance: 6,315 (220 away); Referee: Neil Hair

24 January 2026 28	Barnet	3–2	Oldham Athletic	Edgware
12:30 GMT	Collinge (yellow card) 6'; Glover 36'; Tshimanga 45' (pen.), 87'; Tavares (red card) 64'; Slicker (yellow card) 71'; Smith (yellow card) 90+4'	Report	Pett 11'; Daniels (yellow card) 42'; Stevens 69'	Stadium: The Hive Stadium; Attendance: 2,715; Referee: Darren Drysdale
Note: Fixture was initially scheduled for a 15:00 kick-off, but was rescheduled for live Sky Sports broadcasting.

31 January 2026 30	Oldham Athletic	0–3	Cambridge United	Oldham
15:00 GMT	Drummond (yellow card) 45+2'; Quigley (yellow card) 46'	Report	Ball (yellow card) 41'; Knight 55' (pen.); Appéré 60', 67'; Lavery (yellow card) 87'	Stadium: Boundary Park; Attendance: 7,012 (481 away); Referee: Ruebyn Ricardo

7 February 2026 31	Swindon Town	3–0	Oldham Athletic	Swindon
12:30 GMT	Scanlon 23'; Wilson-Brown (yellow card) 37'; Snowdon (yellow card) 63'; Holman 73'; Batty (yellow card) 90+3'; Drinan 90+6'	Report	Caprice (yellow card) 17'; Daniels (yellow card) 31'; Kavanagh (penalty missed) 80'	Stadium: County Ground; Attendance: 7,183 (438 away); Referee: David Rock
Note: Fixture was initially scheduled for a 15:00 kick-off, but was rescheduled for live Sky Sports broadcasting.

14 February 2026 32	Oldham Athletic	1–1	Fleetwood Town	Oldham
15:00 GMT	Stevens 78'	Report	Helm 45+2'; Powell (yellow card) 62'; Davies (yellow card) 65'	Stadium: Boundary Park; Attendance: 6,639 (280 away); Referee: Alan Dale

17 February 2026 33	Oldham Athletic	2–0	Bristol Rovers	Oldham
19:45 GMT	Drummond 1', (yellow card) 28'; Pett (yellow card) 30'; Kavanagh (yellow card) 37'; Fondop (penalty missed) 59', 59'	Report	Thompson-Sommers (yellow card) 18'; Lockyer (yellow card) 28'; Kilgour (yellow card) 47'; Thomas (yellow card) 68'	Stadium: Boundary Park; Attendance: 6,256 (378 away); Referee: Scott Oldham

21 February 2026 34	Gillingham	0–3	Oldham Athletic	Gillingham
15:00 GMT	Akomeah (yellow card) 48'; Dack (yellow card) 68'	Report	Kavanagh 11'; Monthé 17'; Robson (yellow card) 36'; Kavanagh (yellow card) 45'; Fondop 78'	Stadium: Priestfield Stadium; Attendance: 5,868 (285 away); Referee: James Oldham

28 February 2026 35	Oldham Athletic	2–0	Crawley Town	Oldham
15:00 GMT	Robson (yellow card) 32'; Stevens 38', 51'; Woods (yellow card) 42'; Fondop (yellow card) 45+3'; Caprice (yellow card) 70'	Report	Richards (yellow card) 14'	Stadium: Boundary Park; Attendance: 7,050 (188 away); Referee: Dale Baines

3 March 2026 25	Bromley	0–0	Oldham Athletic	Bromley
19:45 GMT	Charles (yellow card) 22'; Debrah (yellow card) 36'; Odutayo (yellow card) 74'	Report	Robson (yellow card) 66'	Stadium: Hayes Lane; Attendance: 4,254 (252 away); Referee: Ross Martin
Note: Fixture was originally scheduled for 4 January, but it was postponed due to a frozen pitch.

7 March 2026 36	Tranmere Rovers	1–3	Oldham Athletic	Birkenhead
15:00 GMT	Lowe (yellow card) 38'; Murphy (yellow card) 72'; Obiero 90+5'	Report	Fondop 20'; Stevens (yellow card) 42', (goal) 75' (pen.); Kavanagh 45+3'	Stadium: Prenton Park; Attendance: 8,107; Referee: Sam Mulhall

14 March 2026 37	Oldham Athletic	1–0	Grimsby Town	Oldham
15:00 GMT	Hawkes 82', (yellow card) 83'; Woods (yellow card) 90+1'	Report	McEachran (yellow card) 70'; Amaluzor (yellow card) 90+5'	Stadium: Boundary Park; Attendance: 8,896 (1,500 away); Referee: Elliott Swallow

17 March 2026 38	Chesterfield	0–3	Oldham Athetic	Chesterfield
19:45 GMT	Dunkley (yellow card) 26'	Report	Drummond 22', 74'; Fondop 31'; Pett (yellow card) 86'	Stadium: SMH Group Stadium; Attendance: 8,148 (1,021 away); Referee: Ross Joyce

21 March 2026 39	Oldham Athletic	1–0	Harrogate Town	Oldham
15:00 GMT		Report		Stadium: Boundary Park; Attendance: 7,398 (243 away); Referee: Sebastian Stocksbridge

24 March 2026 26	Oldham Athletic	3–0	Notts County	Oldham
19:45 GMT	Drummond 5'; Fondop 56', 69'	Report	Norburn (yellow card) 24' (yellow-red card) 48'; Tsaroulla (yellow card) 28'; Jones (yellow card) 34'	Stadium: Boundary Park; Attendance: 7,701 (1,101 away); Referee: Andrew Humphries
Note: Fixture was originally scheduled for 10 January, but it was postponed due to a frozen pitch.

28 March 2026 40	Crewe Alexandra	2–1	Oldham Athletic	Crewe
15:00 GMT	Hutchinson 33', (yellow card) 46'; Pond (yellow card) 75'; Sanders (yellow card) 83'; Holíček 90+1', (yellow card) 90+2'	Report	Drummond 29'	Stadium: Gresty Road; Attendance: 6,587 (1,680 away); Referee: Simon Mather

3 April 2026 41	Colchester United	1–3	Oldham Athletic	Colchester
15:00 BST	Lisbie 53', (yellow card) 90+2'	Report	Daniels 8'; Woods (yellow card) 42'; Leake (yellow card) 79'; Taylor 86'; Drummond 90+4'	Stadium: Colchester Community Stadium; Attendance: 5,621 (614 away); Referee: Scott Jackson

6 April 2026 42	Oldham Athletic	1–1	Milton Keynes Dons	Oldham
15:00 BST	Fondop 84'	Report	Ekpiteta 30'	Stadium: Boundary Park; Attendance: 8,920; Referee: Steven Copeland

11 April 2026 43	Shrewsbury Town	1–0	Oldham Athletic	Shrewsbury
15:00 BST	Boyle 30'	Report		Stadium: New Meadow; Attendance: 6,609; Referee: Emily Heaslip

14 April 2026 29	Barrow	3–2	Oldham Athletic	Barrow-in-Furness
19:45 BST	Gordon 82'; Rose 83'; Fletcher 90+1'	Report	Payne 49'; Pett 88'	Stadium: Holker Street; Attendance: 2,617; Referee: Edward Duckworth
Note: Fixture was originally scheduled for 27 January, but it was postponed due to a waterlogged pitch.

18 April 2026 44	Oldham Athletic	1–2	Salford City	Oldham
15:00 BST	Hawkes 61'	Report	Oluwo 4'; Udoh 45+3'	Stadium: Boundary Park; Attendance: 8,968; Referee: Will Finnie

25 April 2026 45	Newport County	3–2	Oldham Athletic	Newport
15:00 BST	Kamwa 9', (penalty missed) 90+15', 90+18', (yellow card) 90+20'; Lloyd 46'; Spellman (yellow card) 87'	Report	Sutton 29'; Simeu 35'; Fondop (red card) 38'; Ogle (yellow card) 90+14'; Garner (yellow card) 90+18'	Stadium: Rodney Parade; Attendance: 5,706 (570 away); Referee: David Rock

2 May 2026 46	Oldham Athletic	3–0	Accrington Stanley	Oldham
15:00 BST	Simeu 26'; Taylor 64'; Leake 75'	Report	Brown (yellow card) 90+9'	Stadium: Boundary Park; Attendance: 8,220 (520 away); Referee: James Oldham

=== FA Cup ===
Oldham were drawn at home to Northampton Town in the first round and away to Milton Keynes Dons in the second round.

Win Draw Loss Fixtures

1 November 2025 First round	Oldham Athletic	3–1	Northampton Town	Oldham
15:00 GMT	Mellon 3', 4', 50'; Garner (yellow card) 71'	Report	Thorniley (yellow card) 80'; McGeehan 90+1'; List (yellow card) 90+10'	Stadium: Boundary Park; Attendance: 3,693 (515 away); Referee: Peter Wright

6 December 2025 Secon round	Milton Keynes Dons	3–1	Oldham Athletic	Denbigh
15:00 GMT	Tomlinson 42'; Kelly 57'; Mellish (yellow card) 84'; Méndez-Laing 90+2'	Report	Robson (yellow card) 28'; Monthé (yellow card) 70'; Hannant 76' (pen.); Fondop (yellow card) 84'	Stadium: Stadium MK; Attendance: 3,065; Referee: Zac Kennard-Kettle

=== EFL Cup ===
As a newly promoted League Two side, Oldham will enter the EFL Cup in the preliminary round, due to the number of Premier League teams being involved in European competitions. They would face Accrington Stanley.

Win Draw Loss Fixtures

5 August 2025 Preliminary round	Accrngton Stanley	3–1	Oldham Athletic	Accrington
19:45 BST	Popoola 10'; Mooney 17'; Woods 34'; Brown (yellow card) 52'; Love (yellow card) 90'		Ogle 62'; Morris (yellow card) 71'	Stadium: Crown Ground; Attendance: 2,042; Referee: Scott Oldham

=== EFL Trophy ===
Oldham were drawn against Bolto Wanderers, Rotherham United and Manchester City U21 in the group stage.

Pos	Div	Team	Pld	W	PW	PL	L	GF	GA	GD	Pts	Qualification
1	L1	Bolton Wanderers	3	3	0	0	0	10	2	+8	9	Advance to Round 2
2	L1	Rotherham United	3	2	0	0	1	7	5	+2	6	Advance to Round 2
3	ACA	Manchester City U21	3	1	0	0	2	7	8	−1	3	
4	L2	Oldham Athletic	3	0	0	0	3	5	14	−9	0	

Source: EFL

Win Draw Loss Fixtures

26 August 2025 North Group E	Oldham Athletic	1–5	Man City U21	Oldham, Lancs.
19:00 BST	Hannant 52' (pen.); Drummond (yellow card) 90+4'	Report	Oboavwoduo (yellow card) 33', (goal) 42'; Sangaré 38', 69'; Muir 45+2', 83'	Stadium: Boundary Park; Attendance: 1,753; Referee: Steve Copeland

7 October 2025 North Group E	Rotherham United	3–2	Oldham Athletic	Rotherham, Yorkshire
19:00 BST	Spence 52'; Leake 87' (o.g.); McWilliams (yellow card) 77'; James 90+1'; Hugill (yellow card) 90+2'	Report	Hannant 1' (yellow card) 61'; Ogle 36'	Stadium: New York Stadium; Attendance: 1,310; Referee: Aaron Bannister

11 November 2025 North Group E	Oldham Athletic	2–6	Bolton Wanderers	Oldham, Lancs.
19:00 GMT	Drummond 78'; Morris 88'; Woods (yellow card) 90+3'	Report	Morley (penalty missed) 36'; Osei-Tutu 44'; Dacres-Cogley (yellow card) 45+3'; McAtee 48'; Forss 63', 65'; Dempsey (yellow card) 74'; Ritchie 80'; Dalby 83'	Stadium: Boundary Park; Attendance: 2,392 (1,475 away); Referee: Greg Rollason

== Statistics ==
=== Appearances and goals ===
Players with no appearances are not included on the list; italics indicate a loaned in player

No.	Pos	Nat	Player	Total		League Two		FA Cup		EFL Cup		EFL Trophy	
No.	Pos	Nat	Player	Apps	Goals	Apps	Goals	Apps	Goals	Apps	Goals	Apps	Goals
1	GK	(England) ENG	Mathew Hudson	49	0	46+0	0	2+0	0	0+1	0	0+0	0
2	DF	(Australia) AUS	Reagan Ogle	17	3	12+2	1	0+0	0	1+0	1	2+0	1
3	DF	(England) ENG	Jake Leake	12	2	2+8	2	0+0	0	0+0	0	2+0	0
4	MF	(England) ENG	Tom Pett	43	3	39+1	3	2+0	0	0+0	0	1+0	0
5	DF	(Montserrat) MSR	Donervon Daniels	41	1	39+0	1	2+0	0	0+0	0	0+0	0
6	DF	(Cameroon) CMR	Manny Monthé	50	2	46+0	2	2+0	0	1+0	0	0+1	0
7	MF	(England) ENG	Kane Taylor	16	2	6+10	2	0+0	0	0+0	0	0+0	0
8	MF	(England) ENG	Ryan Woods	48	0	42+1	0	2+0	0	1+0	0	2+0	0
9	FW	(England) ENG	Mike Fondop	46	8	27+14	8	0+2	0	1+0	0	0+2	0
10	MF	(England) ENG	Tom Conlon	13	0	11+0	0	0+0	0	0+1	0	1+0	0
11	FW	(Wales) WAL	Jack Stevens	22	6	14+5	6	1+0	0	0+1	0	1+0	0
14	FW	(England) ENG	Joe Garner	30	3	14+15	3	1+0	0	0+0	0	0+0	0
15	FW	(England) ENG	Kane Drummond	45	8	24+16	7	1+1	0	0+1	0	0+2	1
16	DF	(England) ENG	Will Sutton	30	2	22+2	2	0+2	0	1+0	0	3+0	0
17	FW	(Republic of Ireland) IRL	Calum Kavanagh	10	2	9+1	2	0+0	0	0+0	0	0+0	0
18	MF	(England) ENG	Kieron Morris	10	1	2+5	0	0+0	0	1+0	0	1+1	1
20	DF	(England) ENG	Jake Caprice	29	0	17+9	0	2+0	0	0+0	0	1+0	0
21	MF	(England) ENG	Josh Hawkes	29	5	11+15	5	0+0	0	1+0	0	2+0	0
22	FW	(Portugal) POR	Fábio Jaló	2	0	0+2	0	0+0	0	0+0	0	0+0	0
23	FW	(England) ENG	Kian Harratt	11	1	2+6	1	0+0	0	1+0	0	2+0	0
24	DF	(Scotland) SCO	Jamie Robson	46	0	43+1	0	2+0	0	0+0	0	0+0	0
26	MF	(England) ENG	Kai Payne	35	2	21+11	2	0+2	0	0+0	0	1+0	0
27	MF	(Wales) WAL	Oli Hammond	25	0	7+14	0	1+0	0	1+0	0	1+1	0
28	FW	(Scotland) SCO	Michael Mellon	18	10	14+2	7	2+0	3	0+0	0	0+0	0
29	DF	(England) ENG	Josh Kay	1	0	0+0	0	0+0	0	0+0	0	1+0	0
30	FW	(England) ENG	Billy Waters	1	0	0+0	0	0+0	0	0+0	0	1+0	0
31	GK	(England) ENG	Tom Donaghy	5	0	0+1	0	0+0	0	1+0	0	3+0	0
33	FW	(England) ENG	Oliver Howard	1	0	0+0	0	0+0	0	0+0	0	0+1	0
38	MF	(Republic of Ireland) IRL	Frankie McMahon-Brown	1	0	0+1	0	0+0	0	0+0	0	0+0	0
39	MF	(England) ENG	Isaac Anderson	1	0	0+1	0	0+0	0	0+0	0	0+0	0
40	DF	(England) ENG	Dynel Simeu	13	2	8+3	2	1+0	0	0+0	0	1+0	0
Players who featured but departed the club during the season:
7	MF	(Republic of Ireland) IRL	Harry Charsley	1	0	0+0	0	0+0	0	0+0	0	1+0	0
17	FW	(Republic of Ireland) IRL	Joe Quigley	23	3	11+8	3	0+2	0	0+0	0	2+0	0
19	MF	(England) ENG	Luke Hannant	30	4	17+8	1	1+1	1	1+0	0	2+0	2
22	DF	(England) ENG	Charlie Olson	3	0	0+0	0	0+0	0	0+0	0	2+1	0
