= Tyrhys Dolan =

English footballer (born 2001)

Personal information
- Full name: Tyrhys Dolan
- Date of birth: 28 December 2001 (age 24)
- Place of birth: Manchester, England
- Height: 1.70 m (5 ft 7 in)
- Positions: Winger; striker

Team information
- Current team: Espanyol
- Number: 24

Youth career
- 2009–2011: Manchester City
- 2011–2014: Burnley
- 2014–2017: Manchester City
- 2017–2020: Preston North End

Senior career*
Years	Team	Apps	(Gls)
2020	Preston North End	0	(0)
2020	→ Clitheroe (loan)	4	(2)
2020–2025	Blackburn Rovers	192	(23)
2025–	Espanyol	44	(3)

International career^{‡}
2022	England U20	2	(1)
- * Club domestic league appearances and goals as of 24 October 2026 ‡ National team caps and goals as of 21:58, 29 March 2022 (UTC)

Tyrhys Dolan (born 28 December 2001) is an English professional footballer who plays as a winger for La Liga club Espanyol.

== Club career ==
He initially joined the academy of Manchester City at the age of seven, but was released at the age of nine. He spent three years at Burnley before a return to Manchester City, who again released him at the age of fifteen.

Dolan moved to Preston North End, before joining Clitheroe on loan in February 2020, making four appearances and scoring two goals. He signed his first professional contract with Blackburn Rovers on 1 July 2020. He made his professional debut with Blackburn Rovers in a 3–2 EFL Cup win over Doncaster Rovers on 29 August 2020. Dolan made his league debut in a 3–2 loss to Bournemouth.

He was offered a new contract by Blackburn at the end of the 2024–25 season, but turned it down to join La Liga side Espanyol on a three-year deal.

== International career ==
On 25 March 2022, Dolan made his England U20 debut in a 2–0 defeat to Poland at the Municipal Stadium in Bielsko-Biała. He scored his first goal for that age group four days later during a 3–1 victory over Germany in Colchester.

== Personal life ==
Dolan was born in Manchester, but was raised in Broadheath, Greater Manchester. He attended St Bede's College, Manchester and was in the same year as future England internationals Cole Palmer and Taylor Harwood-Bellis. Following the suicide of close friend Jeremy Wisten, who Dolan had met in the academy of Manchester City, Dolan told Blackburn Rovers that he wished to use his position to promote mental health awareness. He is an ambassador for the Go Again charity, who provide mental health support for sportspeople who are released from their clubs.

== Career statistics ==
As of match played 27 October 2026

Appearances and goals by club, season and competition
Club	Season	League			National cup (Note: Includes FA Cup, Copa Del Rey)		League cup (Note: Includes League Cup.)		Other		Total	
Club	Season	Division	Apps	Goals	Apps	Goals	Apps	Goals	Apps	Goals	Apps	Goals
Clitheroe (loan)	2019–20	NPL Division One North-West	4	2	—		—		—		4	2
Blackburn Rovers	2020–21	Championship	37	3	1	0	2	0	—		40	3
Blackburn Rovers	2021–22	Championship	35	4	1	0	1	1	—		37	5
Blackburn Rovers	2022–23	Championship	40	4	4	1	4	1	—		48	6
Blackburn Rovers	2023–24	Championship	36	5	2	0	1	0	—		39	5
Blackburn Rovers	2024–25	Championship	44	7	2	0	1	0	—		47	7
Blackburn Rovers	Total		192	23	10	1	9	2	—		211	26
Espanyol	2025–26	La Liga	36	2	2	0	—		—		38	2
Espanyol	2026–27	La Liga	8	1	1	0	—		—		9	1
Espanyol	Total		44	3	3	0	—		—		47	3
Career total			240	28	13	1	9	2	0	0	262	31

== Honours ==
Individual

Junior Rover Player of the Year: 2024-25
