= Josh Hawkes =

English footballer (born 1999)

Personal information
- Full name: Joshua Stuart Hawkes
- Date of birth: 28 January 1999 (age 27)
- Place of birth: Stockton-on-Tees, England
- Height: 6 ft 0 in (1.83 m)
- Position: Attacking midfielder

Team information
- Current team: Oldham Athletic
- Number: 21

Senior career*
Years	Team	Apps	(Gls)
2017–2020	Hartlepool United	61	(12)
2017	→ Marske United (loan)	2	(0)
2017–2018	→ Dunston UTS (loan)	4	(2)
2020–2022	Sunderland	1	(0)
2021–2022	→ Tranmere Rovers (loan)	15	(1)
2022–2025	Tranmere Rovers	121	(23)
2025–	Oldham Athletic	26	(5)
- * Club domestic league appearances and goals as of 23:51, 2 May 2026 (UTC)

Joshua Stuart Hawkes (born 28 January 1999) is an English footballer who plays as an attacking midfielder for EFL League Two club Oldham Athletic.

== Playing career ==
=== Hartlepool United ===
Hawkes was drafted into the First Team picture in February 2017 after impressing then-boss Dave Jones whilst still a scholar. He made his first senior appearance coming on as a late substitute for Michael Woods in a 4–0 win for Hartlepool against Crewe Alexandra. In March 2017, Hawkes signed his first professional contract with Hartlepool, along with Ryan Catterick, Kenton Richardson and Aaron Cunningham.

Hawkes joined Northern League Division One side Dunston UTS on loan in November 2017. He scored twice in four appearances during this short-term loan deal. Hawkes enjoyed his first extended spell in the first team under Matthew Bates and scored his first goal in professional football in a 2–1 win over Bromley in March 2018. He finished the 2017–18 season with two goals in twelve appearances.

Hawkes continued his positive form into the 2018–19 season. After an extended spell out of the team, Hawkes regained his place after scoring the consolation goal in a 2–1 defeat at Dover Athletic. He finished the season with nine goals in thirty-one appearances, including winning goals against Maidenhead United, Braintree Town and Wrexham.

=== Sunderland ===
On 15 September 2020, Hawkes signed for Sunderland on a two-year deal. He scored his first goal for the club in an EFL Cup tie against Port Vale on 10 August 2021. On 11 January 2022, Hawkes made his League debut against Lincoln City in a 3–1 Defeat.

=== Tranmere Rovers ===
On 2 September 2021, Hawkes joined League Two side Tranmere Rovers on a season-long loan deal. On 7 January 2022, Hawkes returned to Sunderland along with teammates Jack Diamond and Anthony Patterson following a COVID-19 outbreak in the Sunderland first team. On 25 January 2022, he returned to Tranmere Rovers on a permanent deal, signing a contract until the summer of 2024. In the 2024–25 season, Hawkes' game time at Tranmere was limited and he made 23 league appearances; as a result, it was announced in June 2025 that he was to leave the club to pursue opportunities elsewhere. Including his loan spell, Hawkes made 149 appearances for Tranmere in all competitions, scoring 27 times.

=== Oldham Athletic ===
On 1 July 2025, Hawkes joined newly promoted League Two side Oldham Athletic on a two-year deal. Hawkes scored his first goal for Oldham on his home debut in a 1–1 draw against Colchester United on 9 August 2025.

Following the conclusion of the 2025–26 season, Hawkes was made available for transfer by the club.

== Career statistics ==
As of 2 May 2026

Club	Season	Division	League		FA Cup		League Cup		Other		Total	
Club	Season	Division	Apps	Goals	Apps	Goals	Apps	Goals	Apps	Goals	Apps	Goals
Hartlepool United	2016–17	League Two	2	0	0	0	0	0	0	0	2	0
Hartlepool United	2017–18	National League	12	2	0	0	0	0	0	0	12	2
Hartlepool United	2018–19	National League	29	9	1	0	0	0	2	0	32	9
Hartlepool United	2019–20	National League	18	1	3	1	0	0	1	0	22	2
Hartlepool United	Total		61	12	4	1	0	0	3	0	68	13
Sunderland	2020–21	League One	0	0	0	0	0	0	1	0	1	0
Sunderland	2021–22	League One	1	0	0	0	1	1	0	0	2	1
Sunderland	Total		1	0	0	0	1	1	1	0	3	1
Tranmere Rovers	2021–22	League Two	35	6	1	0	0	0	1	0	37	6
Tranmere Rovers	2022–23	League Two	42	10	1	0	2	1	2	0	47	11
Tranmere Rovers	2023–24	League Two	36	6	0	0	2	0	1	0	39	6
Tranmere Rovers	2024–25	League Two	23	2	1	0	0	0	2	2	26	4
Tranmere Rovers	Total		136	24	3	0	4	1	6	2	149	27
Oldham Athletic	2025–26	League Two	26	5	0	0	1	0	2	0	29	5
Career total			217	39	7	1	6	2	10	2	240	44
