= 2025–26 Southend United F.C. season =

Southend United
2025–26 season
- Chairman: Justin Rees
- Head Coach: Kevin Maher
- Stadium: Roots Hall
- National League: 6th
- Play-offs: Quarter-finals
- FA Cup: First round
- FA Trophy: Final
- Top goalscorer: League: Andy Dallas (17); All: Andy Dallas; Gus Scott-Morriss (17)
- Highest home attendance: 9,716 vs Braintree Town (3 April 2026, National League)
- Lowest home attendance: 3,507 vs Folkestone Invicta (11 October 2025, FA Cup)
- Average home league attendance: 8,103

The 2025–26 Southend United F.C. season was Southend United's 120th season in existence, and their fifth season in the National League after their relegation from League Two in the 2020–21 season. The club competed in the National League, the FA Cup, and the FA Trophy. It was Kevin Maher's fifth season in charge of the club since his appointment as head coach on 20 October 2021.

On 17 May, Southend United beat Wealdstone 4–2 on penalties at Wembley Stadium in the FA Trophy final, to win the first trophy in the club's history. Goalkeeper Colin Andeng Ndi saved Wealdstone's first two penalties, with Jack Bridge and Joe Gubbins both scoring their spot kicks. Charley Kendall was denied, however successful penalties from Harry Boyes and Gus Scott-Morriss meant that Southend won the shootout.

== Pre-season and friendlies ==
On 8 June 2025, the club announced that 18 players from the previous season would remain at the club, with 2 players, Danny Waldron and Jack Wood, set for release on 1 July 2025. James Golding and Ben Goodliffe both returned to their parent clubs after loan spells. Macauley Bonne was offered a new contract, but officially left the club on 11 August 2025.

On 19 June 2025, Southend announced their first signing of the season, with Bulgarian centre-forward Slavi Spasov joining the club from National League South side Slough Town. The club announced three more permanent signings before the start of the season, with Sam Austin joining from Notts County, Harry Boyes joining from Sheffield United, and Ben Goodliffe returning to the club on a permanent basis from Colchester United, after spending the second half of the 2024–25 season on loan at the club.

The club also signed Andy Dallas on loan from Barnsley on 8 August 2025, with the Scottish centre-forward joining until the end of the 2025–26 season.

Southend United announced 6 friendlies against Cardiff City, Bishop's Stortford, Luton Town, AFC Wimbledon, Slough Town, and Charlton Athletic.

Win Draw Loss

12 July 2025 Friendly	Cardiff City	3–0	Southend United	San Pedro del Pinatar
18:00 BST	Salech 26', 37'; Colwill 80'	Report		Stadium: Pinatar Arena

19 July 2025 Friendly	Bishop's Stortford	1–2	Southend United	Bishop's Stortford
15:00 BST	Akanbi 38'	Report	Scott-Morriss 36' (pen.); Kendall 81'	Stadium: Woodside Park; Attendance: 591

22 July 2025 Friendly	Southend United	0–2	Luton Town	Luton
19:45 BST		Report	Woodrow 41'; Nordås 80'	Stadium: Kenilworth Road; Attendance: 1,919; Referee: Aaron Farmer

26 July 2025 Friendly	Southend United	1–0	AFC Wimbledon	Southend-on-Sea
13:00 BST	Kendall 7'	Report		Stadium: Roots Hall; Attendance: 1,505; Referee: Daniel Baines

29 July 2025 Friendly	Slough Town	0–0	Southend United	Slough
19:45 BST		Report		Stadium: Arbour Park; Attendance: 869

2 August 2025 Friendly	Southend United	0–3	Charlton Athletic	Southend-on-Sea
15:00 BST		Report	Carey 19'; Ahadme 49', 50'	Stadium: Roots Hall; Attendance: 2,696; Referee: Robert Claussen

== Competitions ==
Southend played in the National League in the 2025–26 season, as well as in the FA Cup and FA Trophy.

=== National League ===
Pos	Team	Pld	W	D	L	GF	GA	GD	Pts	Promotion, qualification or relegation
4	Boreham Wood	46	27	9	10	95	58	+37	90	Qualification for the National League play-off quarter-finals
5	Scunthorpe United	46	23	13	10	77	62	+15	82	Qualification for the National League play-off quarter-finals
6	Southend United	46	23	12	11	83	47	+36	81	Qualification for the National League play-off quarter-finals
7	Forest Green Rovers	46	23	12	11	82	52	+30	81	Qualification for the National League play-off quarter-finals
8	FC Halifax Town	46	20	10	16	69	66	+3	70	

Source: National League official site
Rules for classification: 1) Points; 2) Goal difference; 3) Number of goals scored; 4) Number of matches won; 5) Head-to-head results

==== Results summary ====
Overall								Home						Away					
Pld	W	D	L	GF	GA	GD	Pts	W	D	L	GF	GA	GD	W	D	L	GF	GA	GD
46	23	12	11	83	47	+36	81	13	7	3	41	18	+23	10	5	8	42	29	+13

Last updated: 29 April 2026.

==== Matches - Regular Season ====
Southend United's fixtures were announced on 9 July 2025.

9 August 2025 1	Gateshead	0–3	Southend United	Gateshead
15:00 BST		Report	Austin 3'; Walker 53'; Kendall 56'	Stadium: Gateshead International Stadium; Attendance: 1,278; Referee: Stuart Morland

16 August 2025 2	Southend United	2–0	Tamworth	Southend-on-Sea
15:00 BST	Kendall 11'; Scott-Morriss 80'	Report		Stadium: Roots Hall; Attendance: 8,112; Referee: Neil Hair

20 August 2025 3	Southend United	0–0	York City	Southend-on-Sea
19:45 BST		Report		Stadium: Roots Hall; Attendance: 8,735; Referee: Jacob Miles

23 August 2025 4	Truro City	0–1	Southend United	Truro
15:00 BST		Report	Austin 63'	Stadium: Truro Sports Hub; Attendance: 3,067; Referee: Sam Mulhall

25 August 2025 5	Southend United	1–1	Hartlepool United	Southend-on-Sea
15:00 BST	Parkes 2' (og.)	Report	Sheron 66'	Stadium: Roots Hall; Attendance: 8,516; Referee: Jason Richardson

30 August 2025 6	Solihull Moors	1–2	Southend United	Solihull
12:30 BST	Creaney 53'	Report	Dallas 5', 72'	Stadium: Damson Park; Attendance: 1,566; Referee: Paul Marsden

2 September 2025 7	Wealdstone	3–2	Southend United	Ruislip
19:45 BST	Boldewijn 22'; Adarkwa 67', 70' (pen.)	Report	Spasov 32'; Scott-Morriss 84'	Stadium: Grosvenor Vale; Attendance: 2,309; Referee: James Oldham

6 September 2025 8	Southend United	3–0	Halifax Town	Southend-on-Sea
15:00 BST	Dallas 31'; Scott-Morriss 90'; Goodliffe 90+15'	Report	Alimi-Adetoro (yellow card) 36' (yellow-red card) 69'	Stadium: Roots Hall; Attendance: 8,093; Referee: Paul Johnson

13 September 2025 9	Southend United	1–1	Boston United	Southend-on-Sea
15:00 BST	Dallas 84'	Report	Mills 81'	Stadium: Roots Hall; Attendance: 7,900; Referee: Isaac Searle

24 September 2025 10	Eastleigh	2–1	Southend United	Eastleigh
19:45 BST	Blair 50'; Taylor 80'	Report	Dallas 76'	Stadium: Silverlake Stadium; Attendance: 2,596; Referee: Harrison Blair

27 September 2025 11	Southend United	0–2	Scunthorpe United	Southend-on-Sea
15:00 BST		Report	Beestin 50'; Sellars-Fleming 55'	Stadium: Roots Hall; Attendance: 8,185; Referee: Elliott Swallow

30 September 2025 12	Boreham Wood	1–1	Southend United	Borehamwood
19:45 BST	Rush 69'	Report	Walker 81'	Stadium: Meadow Park; Attendance: 1,839; Referee: Alex Chilowicz

4 October 2025 13	Southend United	3–0	Aldershot Town	Southend-on-Sea
15:00 BST	Dallas 16'; Spasov 74'; Ralph 88'	Report		Stadium: Roots Hall; Attendance: 7,754; Referee: Lewis Sandoe

18 October 2025 14	Morecambe	0–3	Southend United	Morecambe
15:00 BST		Report	Spasov 25'; Goodliffe 40'; Walker 90+3'	Stadium: Mazuma Mobile Stadium; Attendance: 3,042; Referee: Paul Marsden

25 October 2025 15	Southend United	2–0	Brackley Town	Southend-on-Sea
15:00 BST	Chambers-Parillon 90+5'; Dallas 90+8'	Report		Stadium: Roots Hall; Attendance: 7,963; Referee: Gareth Rhodes

5 November 2025 16	Woking	1–1	Southend United	Woking
19:45 BST	Kelly 68'	Report	Bridge 90+4'	Stadium: Laithwaite Community Stadium; Attendance: 2,708; Referee: Aji Ajibola

8 November 2025 17	Southend United	1–2	Carlisle United	Southend-on-Sea
17:30 BST	Austin 31'	Report	Conn-Clarke 19'; Linney 29'	Stadium: Roots Hall; Attendance: 8,847; Referee: Michael Barlow

15 November 2025 18	Yeovil Town	0–1	Southend United	Yeovil
15:03 BST		Report	Spasov 90+2'	Stadium: Huish Park; Attendance: 3,060; Referee: Scott Jackson

22 November 2025 19	Southend United	3–0	Altrincham	Southend-on-Sea
15:00 BST	Coker 9'; Ralph 19'; Walker 87'	Report	Sassi (yellow card) 28' (yellow-red card) 86'	Stadium: Roots Hall; Attendance: 7,883; Referee: Harry Wager

29 November 2025 20	Forest Green Rovers	2–1	Southend United	Nailsworth
15:00 BST	Whitwell 78'; McAllister 80'	Report	Spasov 68'	Stadium: The New Lawn; Attendance: 2,659; Referee: Declan Brown

20 December 2025 21	Tamworth	2–1	Southend United	Tamworth
17:30 BST	Cullinane-Liburd 21'; Maher 68'	Report	Coker 48'	Stadium: The Lamb Ground; Attendance: 1,399; Referee: Harrison Blair

26 December 2025 22	Braintree Town	0–1	Southend United	Braintree
15:00 BST		Report	Goodliffe (red card); Scott-Morriss 75'	Stadium: Rare Breed Meat Co. Stadium; Attendance: 3,106; Referee: Scott Oldham

30 December 2025 23	Southend United	1–0	Sutton United	Southend-on-Sea
19:45 BST	Scott-Morriss 17'	Report		Stadium: Roots Hall; Attendance: 8,798; Referee: Alan Dale

17 January 2026 24	York City	1–1	Southend United	York
17:30 BST	Pearce 87'	Report	Cardwell 31'	Stadium: LNER Stadium; Attendance: 7,114; Referee: Oliver Mackey

20 January 2026 25	Southend United	4–1	Eastleigh	Southend-on-Sea
19:45 BST	Kendall 24', 54'; Scott-Morriss 49'; Walker 89'	Report	Humphries 80'	Stadium: Roots Hall; Attendance: 7,050; Referee: Sam Mulhall

24 January 2026 26	Boston United	3–3	Southend United	Boston
15:00 BST	John-Lewis 28', 58'; Maguire 54' (pen.)	Report	Dallas 19', 66' (pen.); Spasov 81'	Stadium: Jakemans Community Stadium; Attendance: 2,281; Referee: James Westgate

27 January 2026 27	Rochdale	2–1	Southend United	Rochdale
19:45 BST	Gordon 44'; Gilmour 90'	Report	Scott-Morriss 40'	Stadium: Crown Oil Arena; Attendance: 2,435; Referee: Seb Stockbridge

7 February 2026 28	Scunthorpe United	1–0	Southend United	Scunthorpe
15:00 BST	Roberts 45+3'	Report		Stadium: Attis Arena; Attendance: 5,298; Referee: Ben Atkinson

14 February 2026 29	Southend United	5–1	Morecambe	Southend-on-Sea
15:00 BST	Scott-Morriss 22'; Boyes 32'; Dallas 53'; Walker 62'; Hopper 90+7'	Report	Sangare 58'	Stadium: Roots Hall; Attendance: 7,985; Referee: Callum Walchester

21 February 2026 30	Brackley Town	0–3	Southend United	Brackley
15:00 BST		Report	Hopper 81'; Morrison 90' (og.); Scott-Morriss 90+2'	Stadium: St James Park; Attendance: 1,751; Referee: Paul Johnson

24 February 2026 31	Southend United	0–2	Boreham Wood	Southend-on-Sea
19:45 BST		Report	Abdulmalik 11'; Rush 75'	Stadium: Roots Hall; Attendance: 7,332; Referee: Craig Hicks

3 March 2026 32	Southend United	1–1	Truro City	Southend-on-Sea
19:45 BST	Kendall 52'	Report	Pyke 32'	Stadium: Roots Hall; Attendance: 7,741; Referee: George Laflin

7 March 2026 33	Carlisle United	2–2	Southend United	Carlisle
17:30 BST	Kelly 3'; Linney 36'	Report	Dallas 65'; Thomas 81' (og.)	Stadium: Brunton Park; Attendance: 10,520; Referee: Paul Marsden

10 March 2026 34	Southend United	1–1	Gateshead	Southend-on-Sea
19:45 BST	Dallas 21'	Report	Nicholson 45'	Stadium: Roots Hall; Attendance: 6,822; Referee: Darren Drysdale

14 March 2026 35	Southend United	2–0	Forest Green Rovers	Southend-on-Sea
15:00 BST	Golding 3'; Scott-Morriss 72'	Report		Stadium: Roots Hall; Attendance: 8,702; Referee: Paul Howard

17 March 2026 36	Southend United	3–2	Rochdale	Southend-on-Sea
19:45 BST	Dallas 3'; Golding 17'; Hopper 27'	Report	Dieseruvwe 20'; Pettit 55'	Stadium: Roots Hall; Attendance: 7,259; Referee: Charles Breakspear

21 March 2026 37	Altrincham	1–0	Southend United	Altrincham
15:00 BST	Humbles 14'	Report		Stadium: J. Davidson Stadium; Attendance: 2,101; Referee: Dean Watson

25 March 2026 38	Southend United	1–1	Woking	Southend-on-Sea
19:45 BST	Hopper 88'	Report	Sanderson 20'	Stadium: Roots Hall; Attendance: 7,381; Referee: Robert Massey-Ellis

31 March 2026 39	Southend United	2–1	Yeovil Town	Southend-on-Sea
19:45 BST	Scott-Morriss 4'; Appiah-Forson 84'	Report	Wannell 64'	Stadium: Roots Hall; Attendance: 7,793; Referee: Abigail Byrne

3 April 2026 40	Southend United	3–2	Braintree Town	Southend-on-Sea
15:00 BST	Dallas 6', 33'; Coker 54'	Report	Battrum 69'; Kamara 83'	Stadium: Roots Hall; Attendance: 9,716; Referee: Wayne Cartmel

6 April 2026 41	Sutton United	0–3	Southend United	Sutton
15:00 BST		Report	Spasov 53'; Scott-Morriss 60', 63'	Stadium: VBS Community Stadium; Attendance: 3,711; Referee: Harry Wager

11 April 2026 42	Southend United	0–0	Solihull Moors	Southend-on-Sea
15:00 BST		Report		Stadium: Roots Hall; Attendance: 8,993; Referee: Aaron Bannister

14 April 2026 43	Aldershot Town	0–2	Southend United	Aldershot
19:45 BST	Inwood (red card)	Report	Scott-Morriss 35'; Kendall 45+2'	Stadium: EBB Stadium; Attendance: 1,992; Referee: Sam Mulhall

18 April 2026 44	Halifax Town	2–6	Southend United	Halifax
12:30 BST	Harris 19'; Morris 85'	Report	Coker 6', 52'; Dallas 31' (pen.); Cardwell 42'; Scott-Morriss 59'; Chambers-Parillon 90+7'	Stadium: The Shay; Attendance: 1,896; Referee: Ross Joyce

21 April 2026 45	Hartlepool United	4–3	Southend United	Hartlepool
19:45 BST	Sinclair 31', 63'; Reid 47'; Miley 71'	Report	Dallas 1'; Austin 78'; Kendall 85'	Stadium: Victoria Park (Hartlepool); Attendance: 3,044; Referee: Martin Woods

25 April 2026 46	Southend United	2–1	Wealdstone	Southend-on-Sea
12:30 BST	Appiah-Forson 11'; Kendall 34'	Report	Obiero 38'	Stadium: Roots Hall; Attendance: 8,803; Referee: James Durkin

==== Play-offs ====
Southend entered the play-offs after finishing 6th in the National League. This meant that they would face the team who finished in 5th, which was Scunthorpe United.

28 April 2026 Promotion Play-offs Qualifying Round	Scunthorpe United	1–0	Southend United	Scunthorpe
19:45 BST	Roberts 5'	Report	Taylor (yellow card) 36' (yellow-red card) 90+8'	Stadium: Attis Arena; Attendance: 6,248; Referee: James Oldham

=== FA Cup ===
On 29 September 2025, Southend United were drawn at home to Folkestone Invicta in the FA Cup fourth round qualifying.

11 October 2025 Fourth qualifying round	Southend United	4–1	Folkestone Invicta	Southend-on-Sea
15:00 BST	Spasov 20', 37'; Goodliffe 27'; Walker 83'	Report	Pigott 74'	Stadium: Roots Hall; Attendance: 3,507; Referee: Wayne Cartmel

1 November 2025 First round	Wealdstone	1–0	Southend United	Ruislip
15:00 BST	Olomola 19'	Report	Goodliffe (red card) 17'	Stadium: Grosvenor Vale; Attendance: 2,146; Referee: Carl Brook

=== FA Trophy ===
On 17 November 2025, Southend were drawn at home against fellow National League side Truro City, with the game set to take place on 13 December 2025.

In the following four rounds, Southend United were drawn away against Bath City, Chatham Town, Horsham, and Southport. After winning all of these matches, they are set to face Wealdstone in the final at Wembley Stadium on 17 May 2026.

13 December 2025 Third round	Southend United	4–0	Truro City	Southend-on-Sea
15:00 BST	Cardwell 32'; Bridge 45+1'; Walker 64'; Harrison 82' (og.)	Report		Stadium: Roots Hall; Attendance: 3,715; Referee: Aji Ajibola

13 January 2026 Fourth round	Bath City	1–3	Southend United	Bath
19:45 BST	Raynes (red card) 19'; Alves 61'	Report	Scott-Morriss 21'; Austin 54'; Chambers-Parillon 90+7'	Stadium: Twerton Park; Attendance: 1,131; Referee: Greg Rollason

31 January 2026 Fifth round	Chatham Town	0–1	Southend United	Chatham
15:00 BST		Report	Scott-Morriss 68'	Stadium: Bauvill Stadium; Attendance: 2,135; Referee: Isaac Searle

28 February 2026 Quarter-finals	Horsham	1–2	Southend United	Horsham
15:00 BST	Philpot 41'	Report	Appiah-Forson 2'; Bridge 15'	Stadium: Hop Oast Stadium; Attendance: 2,580; Referee: Matthew Russell

28 March 2026 Semi-finals	Southport	1–3	Southend United	Southport
15:00 BST	Sze 30'; Renshaw (red card) 90+2'	Report	Kendall 53', 75'; Bridge 55'	Stadium: Haig Avenue; Attendance: 5,600; Referee: Stephen Parkinson

17 May 2026 Final	Southend United	0–0 (4-2 p)	Wealdstone	Wembley
16:30 BST		Report		Stadium: Wembley Stadium; Attendance: 43,306; Referee: Farai Hallam
	Penalties
	Bridge (penalty scored); Gubbins (penalty scored); Kendall (penalty missed); Boyes (penalty scored); Scott-Morriss (penalty scored)		(penalty missed) Olomola; (penalty missed) Hinchy; (penalty scored) Obiero; (penalty scored) McAvoy

== Squad statistics ==
As of match played 17 May 2026

No.	Pos.	Nat.	Name	League		Play-offs		FA Cup		FA Trophy		Total		Discipline	
No.	Pos.	Nat.	Name	Apps	Goals	Apps	Goals	Apps	Goals	Apps	Goals	Apps	Goals	Yellow card	Red card
1	GK	IRE	Owen Mason	7	0	0	0	0	0	2	0	9	0	0	0
2	DF	ENG	Gus Scott-Morriss	40+1	15	1	0	1	0	4+1	2	46+2	17	14	0
3	DF	ENG	Nathan Ralph	22+1	2	0	0	2	0	3	0	27+1	2	5	0
4	DF	ENG	George Wind	2	0	0	0	0	0	0+1	0	2+1	0	0	0
6	DF	ENG	Ben Goodliffe	31+8	2	0	0	2	1	5	0	38+8	3	3	2
7	MF	ENG	Jack Bridge	3+29	1	0+1	0	2	0	6	3	11+30	4	1	0
8	MF	AFG	Noor Husin	6	0	0	0	0	0	0	0	6	0	2	0
9	FW	SCO	Andy Dallas	37+4	17	1	0	2	0	2+1	0	42+5	17	4	0
10	MF	ENG	Sam Austin	29+17	4	0	0	0+1	0	5+1	1	34+19	5	1	0
11	FW	ENG	Josh Walker	9+19	6	0	0	0+2	1	1+3	1	10+26	8	5	0
14	FW	ENG	Tom Hopper	13+26	4	0	0	1+1	0	2+3	0	16+30	4	1	0
15	DF	ENG	Joe Gubbins	30+3	0	1	0	0+2	0	2+2	0	33+7	0	8	0
16	DF	ENG	Harry Taylor	43	0	1	0	2	0	5	0	51	0	11	1
17	MF	ENG	Cav Miley	23+9	0	0+1	0	1+1	0	2	0	26+11	0	10	0
18	FW	BUL	Slavi Spasov	10+16	7	0	0	1+1	2	2+1	0	13+18	9	1	0
19	MF	ENG	Leon Chambers-Parillon	12+15	2	0+1	0	2	0	3+1	1	17+17	3	0	0
20	MF	ENG	Alfie Massey	2+2	0	0	0	0	0	0	0	2+2	0	0	0
21	FW	SCO	Harry Cardwell	7+3	2	1	0	0	0	3	1	11+3	3	1	0
22	MF	ENG	Keenan Appiah-Forson	27+13	2	1	0	0+1	0	1+4	1	29+18	3	0	0
23	MF	ENG	James Morton	16+17	0	1	0	1	0	4+2	0	22+19	0	1	0
24	FW	ENG	Charley Kendall	16+12	8	0+1	0	0	0	2+4	2	18+17	10	1	0
25	MF	ENG	Noah Mawéné	0+3	0	0	0	0	0	0	0	+3	0	0	0
26	DF	IRE	James Golding	12+3	2	1	0	0	0	2+1	0	15+4	2	3	0
28	MF	ENG	Oliver Coker	26+13	6	1	0	2	0	5	0	34+13	6	4	0
30	GK	CMR	Colin Andeng Ndi	33+1	0	1	0	0	0	4	0	38+1	0	0	0
33	DF	ENG	Harry Boyes	44	1	1	0	1	0	1+4	0	47+4	1	6	0
Player(s) who featured but departed the club during the season:
1	GK	ENG	Nick Hayes	6	0	0	0	2	0	0	0	8	0	1	0

== Transfers ==
=== In ===
Date	Pos.	Name	From	Fee	Ref.
1 July 2025	MF	(England) Sam Austin	(England) Notts County	Free	
1 July 2025	FW	(Bulgaria) Slavi Spasov	(England) Slough Town	Free	
2 July 2025	DF	(England) Harry Boyes	(England) Sheffield United	Free	
8 July 2025	DF	(England) Ben Goodliffe	(England) Colchester United	Free	

=== Out ===
Date	Pos.	Name	To	Fee	Ref.
17 August 2025	MF	(Republic of Ireland) Mikey Faulkner	(England) Bowers & Pitsea	Free	
15 January 2026	DF	(England) Adam Crowther	(England) Chelmsford City	Undisclosed	
15 January 2026	GK	(England) Nick Hayes	(England) Hartlepool United	Free	

=== Loaned out ===
Date from	Date to	Pos.	Name	From	Ref.
24 October 2025	1 January 2026	FW	(England) Jack Stone	(England) Grays Athletic	
4 November 2025	8 January 2026	DF	(England) George Wind	(England) Hornchurch	
27 November 2025	14 January 2026	DF	(England) Adam Crowther	(England) Boston United	
13 February 2026	31 May 2026	DF	(England) George Wind	(England) Aveley	
14 February 2026	15 March 2026	FW	(England) Jack Stone	(England) AFC Sudbury	

=== Loaned in ===
Date from	Date to	Pos.	Name	From	Ref.
8 August 2026	30 June 2026	FW	(England) Andy Dallas	(England) Barnsley	
4 December 2025	31 May 2026	FW	(Scotland) Harry Cardwell	(England) Forest Green Rovers	
20 January 2026	26 April 2026	GK	(Republic of Ireland) Owen Mason	(England) Mansfield Town	
16 February 2026	31 May 2026	DF	(Republic of Ireland) James Golding	(England) Oxford United	
10 March 2026	31 May 2026	MF	(England) Noah Mawéné	(England) Preston North End	
20 March 2026	31 May 2026	MF	(England) Alfie Massey	(England) Millwall	

=== Released / Out of Contract ===
Date	Pos.	Name	Subsequent club	Join date	Ref.
1 July 2025	FW	(England) Danny Waldron	(England) Brackley Town	1 July 2025	
1 July 2025	MF	(England) Jack Wood	(England) Walton & Hersham	1 July 2025	
1 July 2025	FW	(Zimbabwe) Macauley Bonne	(England) Maldon & Tiptree	11 October 2025	
