= 2022–23 Southend United F.C. season =

Southend United
2022–23 season
- Chairman: Ron Martin
- Manager: Kevin Maher
- Stadium: Roots Hall
- National League: 8th
- FA Cup: Fourth qualifying round
- FA Trophy: Fifth round
Home colours	Away colours	Third colours

The 2022–23 Southend United F.C. season was the club's 117th season in their history and the second season in the National League. Along with the National League, the club also participated in the FA Cup and FA Trophy.

The season covered the period from 1 July 2022 to 30 June 2023.

== Players ==
As of 21 July 2022

=== Squad ===
Note: Flags indicate national team as defined under FIFA eligibility rules; some limited exceptions apply. Players may hold more than one non-FIFA nationality.

No.	Pos.	Nation	Player
1	GK	ENG	Steve Arnold
2	DF	ENG	Gus Scott-Morriss
3	DF	ENG	Nathan Ralph
4	DF	ENG	Louis Lomas
5	DF	ENG	Shaun Hobson
6	DF	ENG	Ollie Kensdale
7	MF	ENG	Jack Bridge
9	FW	IRL	Rhys Murphy
10	FW	ENG	Sam Dalby
11	MF	ENG	Callum Powell
12	DF	ENG	Tom Clifford
14	MF	Jersey	Cav Miley
16	MF	ENG	Harry Taylor

No.	Pos.	Nation	Player
18	MF	ENG	Wesley Fonguck
21	MF	ENG	Jon Benton
22	MF	WAL	Dan Mooney
24	DF	CYP	Jason Demetriou
25	MF	ENG	Jack Wood
26	DF	ENG	Tommy Davis
28	MF	ENG	Oli Coker
38	MF	AFG	Noor Husin
39	FW	SCO	Harry Cardwell
—	DF	ENG	Luke Reeve
—	DF	ENG	Louis Arrowsmith
—	DF	ENG	Jaden Crowhurst

== Transfers ==
=== Transfers in ===
Date	Position	Nationality	Name	From	Fee	Ref.
22 May 2022	RW	WAL	Dan Mooney	Altrincham	Free transfer	
22 May 2022	CM	Jersey	Cavaghn Miley	Eastleigh	Free transfer	
27 June 2022	RB	ENG	Harry Taylor	Barnet	Free transfer	
28 June 2022	RB	ENG	Gus Scott-Morriss	Hemel Hempstead Town	Undisclosed	
28 June 2022	CB	ENG	Louis Lomas	Brackley Town	Free transfer	
19 July 2022	CM	ENG	Wesley Fonguck	Barnet	Free transfer	

=== Transfers out ===
Date	Position	Nationality	Name	To	Fee	Ref.
18 May 2022	RB	ENG	Rob Howard	Free agent	Released	
18 May 2022	CB	ENG	Josh Coulson	Free agent	Released	
18 May 2022	CM	ENG	Will Atkinson	Free agent	Released	
18 May 2022	CB	ENG	John White	Free agent	Released	
18 May 2022	RB	ENG	Leon Davies	Free agent	Released	
18 May 2022	CM	ENG	Lewis Gard	Free agent	Released	
18 May 2022	RW	ENG	Terrell Egbri	Free agent	Released	
18 May 2022	CF	ENG	Matt Rush	Free agent	Released	
18 May 2022	RB	ENG	Reiss Chandler	Free agent	Released	
18 May 2022	CM	ENG	James Dunne	Free agent	Released	
18 May 2022	CM	ENG	Abu Ogogo	Free agent	Released	
18 May 2022	CM	ENG	Harry Phillips	Free agent	Released	
18 May 2022	CM	ENG	Eren Kinali	Free agent	Released	
18 May 2022	RW	ENG	Ashley Nathaniel-George	Free agent	Released	
18 May 2022	CB	ENG	Miles Mitchell-Nelson	Free agent	Released	
18 May 2022	CF	NGR	Simeon Akinola	Free agent	Released	

== Pre-season and friendlies ==
9 July 2022	Kings Langley	0–4	Southend United	Kings Langley
15:00		Report	Dalby 41'; Benton 46'; Mooney 65'; Powell 71'	Stadium: The Orbital Fasteners Stadium; Attendance: 385

12 July 2022	Canvey Island	0–7	Southend United	Canvey Island
19:30	Mooney 14', 34'; Wreh (Trialist A) 31'; Powell 66', 82', 85'; Akanbi (Trialist B) 83'	Report		Stadium: Park Lane; Attendance: 883

16 July 2022	Kettering Town	2–2	Southend United	Burton Latimer
15:00	Glover 15'; Richard-Noel 60'	Report	Akanbi (Trialist B) 20'; Wreh (Trialist A) 49'	Stadium: Latimer Park; Attendance: 383

19 July 2022	Colchester United	2–2	Southend United	Colchester
19:30	Sears 23'; Akinde 90+2'	Report	Mooney 71'; Miley 85'	Stadium: JobServe Community Stadium

23 July 2022	Southend United	0–1	Gillingham	Southend-on-Sea
15:00		Report	Mandron 56'	Stadium: Roots Hall; Attendance: 1,374

26 July 2022	Ipswich Town	3–1	Southend United	Ipswich
19:00	John-Jules 7'; Leigh 58'; Ladapo 88'	Report	Powell 77'	Stadium: Portman Road; Attendance: 4,616

30 July 2022	Concord Rangers	2–1	Southend United	Canvey Island
15:00	Green 60' (pen.); Williamson 70' (pen.)	Report	Fiddes 10'	Stadium: The Aspect Arena

== Competitions ==
=== National League ===
==== League table ====
Pos	Team	Pld	W	D	L	GF	GA	GD	Pts	Promotion, qualification or relegation
6	Boreham Wood	46	19	15	12	52	40	+12	72	Qualification for the National League play-off quarter-finals
7	Bromley	46	18	17	11	68	53	+15	71	Qualification for the National League play-off quarter-finals
8	Southend United	46	20	9	17	57	45	+12	69	
9	Eastleigh	46	19	10	17	56	57	−1	67	
10	Dagenham & Redbridge	46	18	9	19	61	72	−11	63	

Rules for classification: 1) Points; 2) Goal difference; 3) Number of goals scored; 4) Number of matches won; 5) Head-to-head results

==== Results summary ====
Overall								Home						Away					
Pld	W	D	L	GF	GA	GD	Pts	W	D	L	GF	GA	GD	W	D	L	GF	GA	GD
46	20	9	17	57	45	+12	69	12	4	7	32	19	+13	8	5	10	25	26	−1

Last updated: 1 May 2023.
Source: TheFishy

==== Matches ====
The 2022–23 National League fixtures were announced on 6 July 2022.

6 August 2022 1	Southend United	0–1	Boreham Wood	Southend-on-Sea
		Report	Newton 28'	Stadium: Roots Hall; Attendance: 5,681; Referee: Michael Barlow

13 August 2022 2	Solihull Moors	1–1	Southend United	Solihull
	Dallas 12'	Report	Wreh 64'	Stadium: ARMCO Arena; Referee: Scott Jackson

16 August 2022 3	Halifax Town	0–0	Southend United	Halifax
		Report		Stadium: The Shay; Attendance: 1,943; Referee: Elliot Swallow

20 August 2022 4	Southend United	1–0	Oldham Athletic	Southend-on-Sea
	Mooney 30'	Report		Stadium: Roots Hall; Attendance: 5,414; Referee: Adrian Quelch

27 August 2022 5	Eastleigh	2–1	Southend United	Eastleigh
	Whitehall 77', 90+6'	Report	Powell 22'	Stadium: Silverlake Stadium; Attendance: 2,383; Referee: Gary Parsons

29 August 2022 6	Southend United	2–0	Maidenhead United	Southend-on-Sea
	Scott-Morriss 22'; Powell 52'	Report		Stadium: Roots Hall; Attendance: 5,563; Referee: Wayne Cartmel

3 September 2022 7	Southend United	1–2	Torquay United	Southend-on-Sea
	Wreh 87'	Report	Hanson 5'; Goodwin 61'	Stadium: Roots Hall; Attendance: 5,177; Referee: Robert Massey-Ellis

13 September 2022 9	Chesterfield	3–2	Southend United	Chesterfield
	Clarke 19'; Quigley 62'; King 69'	Report	Powell 33'; Dackers 46'	Stadium: Technique Stadium; Attendance: 6,269; Referee: David Richardson

17 September 2022 10	Southend United	0–0	Wrexham	Southend-on-Sea
		Report		Stadium: Roots Hall; Attendance: 6,266; Referee: Aaron Bannister

24 September 2022 11	Wealdstone	0–1	Southend United	London
		Report	Dackers 63' (pen.)	Stadium: Grosvenor Vale; Attendance: 2,391; Referee: Scott Tallis

1 October 2022 12	Southend United	1–0	Yeovil Town	Southend-on-Sea
	Hyde 37'	Report		Stadium: Roots Hall; Attendance: 5,324; Referee: Sam Mulhall

4 October 2022 13	Southend United	1–1	Woking	Southend-on-Sea
	Dackers 66'	Report	Grego-Cox 14'	Stadium: Roots Hall; Attendance: 5,024; Referee: Jason Richardson

8 October 2022 14	Dagenham & Redbridge	1–1	Southend United	Dagenham
	Morias 19'	Report	Powell 79'	Stadium: Chigwell Construction Stadium; Attendance: 3,542; Referee: Matthew Russell

22 October 2022 15	Southend United	3–0	Scunthorpe United	Southend-on-Sea
	Fonguck 35'; Hyde 49', 73'	Report		Stadium: Roots Hall; Attendance: 5,842; Referee: Aji Ajibola

25 October 2022 16	Maidstone United	0–3	Southend United	Maidstone
		Report	Powell 8'; Bridge 29'; Wreh 71'	Stadium: Gallagher Stadium; Attendance: 2,273; Referee: Gavin Ward

29 October 2022 17	York City	0–2	Southend United	York
		Report	Scott-Morriss 6'; Hobson 61'	Stadium: LNER Community Stadium; Attendance: 4,915; Referee: Paul Marsden

1 November 2022 8	Barnet	0–3	Southend United	London
		Report	Łopata 41'; Powell 52'; Bridge 82' (pen.)	Stadium: The Hive Stadium; Attendance: 2,704; Referee: Alan Dale
Note: The match was postponed due to the passing of Queen Elizabeth II.

8 November 2022 18	Southend United	2–2	Notts County	Southend-on-Sea
	Kensdale 54'; Powell 65'	Report	Langstaff 34'; Scott 60'	Stadium: Roots Hall; Attendance: 6,603; Referee: Daniel Middleton

12 November 2022 19	Southend United	2–0	Dorking Wanderers	Southend-on-Sea
	Bridge 9' (pen.); Hobson 32'	Report		Stadium: Roots Hall; Attendance: 6,400; Referee: Wayne Cartmel

19 November 2022 20	Gateshead	3–1	Southend United	Gateshead
	Conteh 52'; Campbell 72'; Carty 76'	Report	Mooney 87'	Stadium: Gateshead International Stadium; Attendance: 1,874; Referee: Matthew Dicicco

26 November 2022 21	Aldershot Town	2–0	Southend United	Aldershot
	Amaluzor 38'; Jordan 48'	Report		Stadium: Recreation Ground; Attendance: 2,345; Referee: Robert Massey-Ellis

3 December 2022 22	Southend United	2–2	Altrincham	Southend-on-Sea
	Bridge 27'; Wreh 44'	Report	Colclough 35'; Newby 59'	Stadium: Roots Hall; Attendance: 5,593; Referee: Scott Simpson

26 December 2022 25	Southend United	0–1	Bromley	Southend-on-Sea
		Report	Dennis 51'	Stadium: Roots Hall; Attendance: 6,660; Referee: Jacob Miles

1 January 2023 26	Bromley	0–0	Southend United	Bromley
		Report		Stadium: Hayes Lane; Attendance: 3,256; Referee: Elliott Swallow

7 January 2023 27	Southend United	3–0	Solihull Moors	Southend-on-Sea
	Demetriou 19'; Cardwell 55'; Bridge 59'	Report		Stadium: Roots Hall; Attendance: 5,705; Referee: Lewis Smith

28 January 2023 30	Southend United	1–3	Eastleigh	Southend-on-Sea
	Cardwell 77'	Report	Lloyd 34'; Carter 72'; McKiernan 86'	Stadium: Roots Hall; Attendance: 5,735; Referee: Greg Rollason

4 February 2023 31	Southend United	2–0	York City	Southend-on-Sea
	Bridge 64' (pen.), 71'	Report		Stadium: Roots Hall; Attendance: 5,737; Referee: Lloyd Wood

7 February 2023 29	Maidenhead United	1–2	Southend United	Maidenhead
19:40	McCoulsky 8'	Report	Scott-Morriss 42'; Cardwell 90+1'	Stadium: York Road; Attendance: 1,499; Referee: Aaron Jackson
Note: The match was postponed due to a frozen pitch.

14 February 2023 24	Southend United	2–1	Halifax Town	Southend-on-Sea
19:45	Bridge 61' (pen.); Scott-Morriss 80'	Report	Debrah 45+3'	Stadium: Roots Hall; Attendance: 5,045; Referee: Robert Massey-Ellis
Note: The match was postponed due to a frozen pitch.

18 February 2023 33	Southend United	1–0	Gateshead	Southend-on-Sea
	Sandat 5'	Report		Stadium: Roots Hall; Attendance: 6,765; Referee: Ruebyn Ricardo

21 February 2023 34	Notts County	4–0	Southend United	Nottingham
	Langstaff 18', 56'; Austin 23', 83'	Report		Stadium: Meadow Lane; Attendance: 7,237; Referee: Garreth Rhodes

25 February 2023 35	Torquay United	1–2	Southend United	Torquay
	Collins 85'	Report	Powell 27'; Miley 90+1'	Stadium: Plainmoor; Attendance: 2,417; Referee: Gary Parsons

4 March 2023 36	Southend United	0–1	Barnet	Southend-on-Sea
		Report	Kanu 66'	Stadium: Roots Hall; Attendance: 7,213; Referee: Paul Johnson

7 March 2023 37	Southend United	1–2	Chesterfield	Southend-on-Sea
	Cardwell 67'	Report	Maguire 14'; Colclough 65'	Stadium: Roots Hall; Attendance: 5,195; Referee: Lloyd Wood

11 March 2023 38	Wrexham	1–0	Southend United	Wrexham, Wales
	Arnold 38' (o.g.)	Report		Stadium: Racecourse Ground; Attendance: 9,770; Referee: Paul Marsden

14 March 2023 23	Boreham Wood	1–0	Southend United	Borehamwood
19:45	Brunt 74' (pen.)	Report		Stadium: Meadow Park; Attendance: 1,762; Referee: Richie Watkins
Note: The match was postponed to January 2023, due to a frozen pitch. It was then once more rescheduled due to Boreham Wood's participation in the 2022–23 FA Cup.

18 March 2023 39	Southend United	1–2	Aldershot Town	Southend-on-Sea
	Murphy 16'	Report	Frost 63'; Partington 70' (pen.)	Stadium: Roots Hall; Attendance: 5,990; Referee: Scott Simpson

25 March 2023 40	Altrincham	1–0	Southend United	Altrincham
	Linney 80' (pen.)	Report		Stadium: Moss Lane; Attendance: 3,041; Referee: Steven Copeland

28 March 2023 32	Dorking Wanderers	1–0	Southend United	Dorking
19:45	Bowerman 29'	Report		Stadium: Meadowbank; Attendance: 2,230; Referee: Scott Tallis
Note: The match was postponed due to both clubs' involvement in the 2022–23 FA Trophy.

1 April 2023 41	Yeovil Town	0–2	Southend United	Yeovil
		Report	Hyde 24'; Murphy 90+1'	Stadium: Huish Park; Attendance: 3,630; Referee: Ed Duckworth

7 April 2023 42	Southend United	2–0	Maidstone United	Southend-on-Sea
	Bridge 8'; Scott-Morriss 77'	Report		Stadium: Roots Hall; Attendance: 6,603; Referee: Jason Richardson

10 April 2023 43	Woking	1–1	Southend United	Woking
	Dackers 47'	Report	Bridge 53'	Stadium: The Laithwaite Community Stadium; Attendance: 3,798; Referee: Matt Corlett

15 April 2023 44	Southend United	2–0	Dagenham & Redbridge	Southend-on-Sea
	Bridge 51' (pen.), 57' (pen.)	Report		Stadium: Roots Hall; Attendance: 7,345; Referee: Daniel Middleton

18 April 2023 28	Oldham Athletic	2–0	Southend United	Oldham
19:45	Reid 43'; Chapman 76'	Report		Stadium: Boundary Park; Attendance: 5,933; Referee: Greg Rollason
Note: The match was postponed due to a frozen pitch.

22 April 2023 45	Scunthorpe United	1–3	Southend United	Scunthorpe
	Elliott 90+4'	Report	Bridge 35' (pen.); Husin 52'; Hobson 65'	Stadium: Glanford Park; Attendance: 3,169; Referee: Sam Mulhall

29 April 2023 46	Southend United	2–1	Wealdstone	Southend-on-Sea
	Fonguck 50'; Cardwell 81'	Report	Clayden 27'	Stadium: Roots Hall; Attendance: 8,434; Referee: Gary Parsons

=== FA Cup ===
Southend entered the FA Cup at the Fourth qualifying round.

Win Draw Loss

15 October 2022 Fourth qualifying round	Woking	2–1	Southend United	Woking
	Amond 10'; Korboa 82'	Report	Hyde 37'	Stadium: Laithwaite Community Stadium; Attendance: 1,974; Referee: Ruebyn Ricardo

=== FA Trophy ===
Win Draw Loss

Southend entered the FA Trophy at the Third round

20 December 2022 Third round	Southend United	2–0	Boreham Wood	Southend-on-Sea
	Husin 20'; Ralph 78'	Report		Stadium: Roots Hall; Attendance: 1,434; Referee: Farai Hallam

14 January 2023 Fourth round	Southend United	2–1	Darlington	Southend-on-Sea
	Cardwell 6', 90+3'	Report	Lambert 1'	Stadium: Roots Hall; Attendance: 2,741; Referee: Sam Mulhall

11 February 2023 Fifth round	Southend United	0–2	York City	Southend-on-Sea
		Report	Kerr 51'; John-Lewis 88'	Stadium: Roots Hall; Attendance: 2,780; Referee: Alan Dale
