= 2026 FA Trophy final =

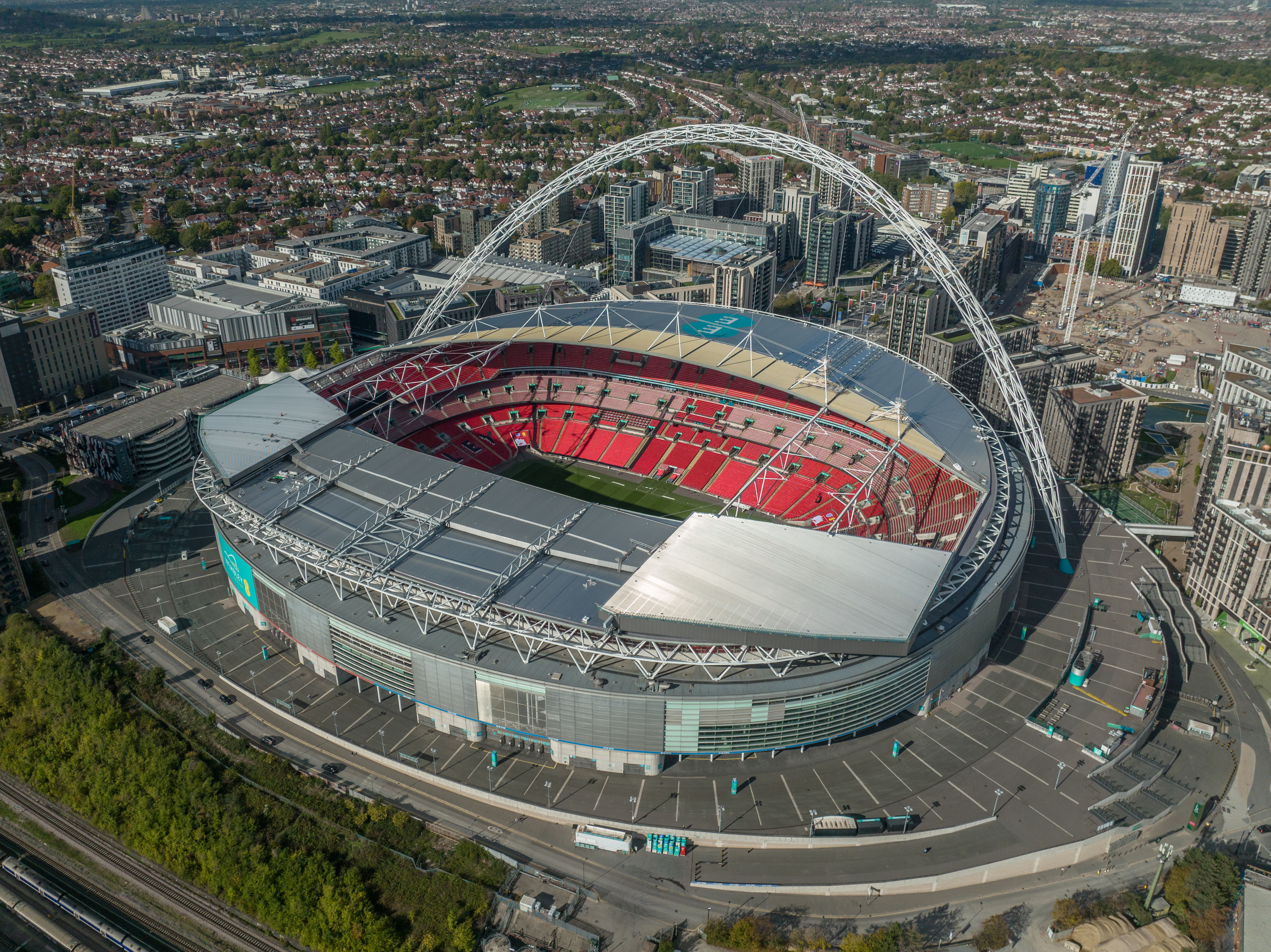
- Wembley Stadium hosted the final
- Event: 2025–26 FA Trophy
Southend United	Wealdstone
0	0
- Southend United won 4–2 after penalties
- Date: 17 May 2026
- Venue: Wembley Stadium, London
- Referee: Farai Hallam (Surrey FA)
- Attendance: 43,306

The 2026 FA Trophy final was an association football match played at Wembley Stadium, London, on 17 May 2026. It was the 57th FA Trophy final and was contested between Southend United and Wealdstone. Due to sponsorship by Isuzu, the final was officially named the Isuzu FA Trophy Final.

As part of Non-League Finals Day, the FA Vase final was played earlier the same day at the same venue.

== Route to the final ==
=== Southend United ===
13 December 2025 3R	Southend United	4–0	Truro City	Southend-on-Sea
15:00 GMT	Cardwell 32'; Bridge 45+1', 82'; Walker 32'	Report		Stadium: Roots Hall; Attendance: 3,715

13 January 2026 4R	Bath City	1–3	Southend United	Bath
15:00 GMT	Alves 61'; Raynes (red card)	Report	Scott-Morriss 22'; Austin 55'; Chambers-Parillon 90+7'	Stadium: Twerton Park; Attendance: 1,130

31 January 2026 5R	Chatham Town	0–1	Southend United	Chatham
15:00 GMT		Report	Scott-Morriss 68' (pen)	Stadium: Bauvill Stadium; Attendance: 2,135

28 February 2026 QF	Horsham	1–2	Southend United	Horsham
15:00 GMT	Philpot 42'	Report	Appiah-Forson 2'; Bridge 14'	Stadium: Hop Oast Stadium; Attendance: 2,580

28 March 2026 SF	Southport	1–3	Southend United	Southport
15:00 GMT	Sze 29'; Renshaw (red card)	Report	Kendall 53', 75'; Bridge 55'	Stadium: Haig Avenue; Attendance: 5,600

=== Wealdstone ===
13 December 2025 3R	Wealdstone	2–1	Cheshunt	Ruislip
15:00 GMT	Obiero 51'; McAvoy 60'	Report	Effa 82'	Stadium: Grosvenor Vale; Attendance: 621

10 January 2026 4R	Wealdstone	1–0	Dagenham & Redbridge	Ruislip
15:00 GMT	Obiero 81'	Report		Stadium: Grosvenor Vale; Attendance: 891

31 January 2026 5R	Forest Green Rovers	0–3	Wealdstone	Nailsworth
15:00 GMT		Report	Boldewijn 22'; Olomola 59'; Adarkwa 90+5'	Stadium: The New Lawn; Attendance: 1,607

28 February 2026 QF	Kidderminster Harriers	1–1 (5–6 p)	Wealdstone	Kidderminster
15:00 BST	Reynolds 25'	Report	Adarkwa 12'	Stadium: Aggborough; Attendance: 3,195
	Penalties
	Morgan-Smith (penalty scored); Kandola (penalty scored); Devine (penalty scored); Reynolds (penalty scored); Foulkes (penalty scored); Evans (penalty missed)		Olomola (penalty scored); Boldewijn (penalty scored); McAvoy (penalty scored); Obiero (penalty scored); Tshikuna (penalty scored); Spencer (penalty scored)

28 March 2026 SF	Wealdstone	1–0	Marine	Ruislip
15:00 GMT	Obiero 90+4'	Report		Stadium: Grosvenor Vale; Attendance: 4,000

== Match ==
=== Details ===
17 May 2026
16:30 BST

Southend United	0–0	Wealdstone
	Report
Penalties
Bridge (penalty scored); Gubbins (penalty scored); Kendall (penalty missed); Boyes (penalty scored); Scott-Morriss (penalty scored)	4–2	Olomola (penalty missed); Hinchy (penalty missed); Obiero (penalty scored); McAvoy (penalty scored)

Wembley Stadium, London
Attendance: 43,306
Referee: Farai Hallam (Surrey)

GK	30	(Italy) Collin Andeng-Ndi
CB	26	(England) James Golding
CB	6	(England) Ben Goodliffe	(substituted off) 60'
CB	3	(England) Nathan Ralph (c)
RWB	2	(England) Gus Scott-Morriss
LWB	7	(England) Jack Bridge
CM	19	(England) Leon Chambers-Parillon	(substituted off) 82'
CM	23	(England) James Morton
CM	28	(England) Oli Coker	(substituted off) 60'
CF	21	(Scotland) Harry Cardwell	(substituted off) 72'
CF	9	(Scotland) Andrew Dallas	(substituted off) 82'
Substitutes:
DF	15	(England) Joe Gubbins	(substituted on) 60'
DF	33	(England) Harry Boyes	(substituted on) 82'
MF	17	(England) Cav Miley
MF	10	(England) Sam Austin
MF	22	(England) Keenan Appiah-Forson	(substituted on) 82'
FW	24	(England) Charley Kendall	(substituted on) 72'
FW	14	(England) Tom Hopper	(substituted on) 82'
Manager:
(Republic of Ireland) Kevin Maher

GK	1	(England) Dante Baptiste
CB	2	(England) Jack Cook (c)	(substituted off) 46'
CB	5	(Kenya) Deon Woodman
CB	22	(Scotland) Connor McAvoy
RWB	17	(Turks and Caicos Islands) Dominic Hutchinson	(substituted off) 78'
LWB	3	(Cyprus) Anthony Georgiou	(substituted off) 90'
CM	8	(England) Dylan Kadji	(substituted off) 90+3'
CM	25	(England) Jack Wells-Morrison
AM	20	(England) Nathan Tshikuna
CF	14	(Kenya) Micah Obiero
CF	27	(England) Sean Adarkwa	(substituted off) 79'
Substitutes:
GK	13	(England) Endurance Johnson
DF	29	(England) Junior Tiensia	(substituted on) 46'
MF	32	(England) Jack Hinchy	(substituted on) 79'
MF	4	(Burundi) Omar Mussa	(substituted on) 90'
MF	12	(England) Michael Adu-Poku	(substituted on) 78'
MF	15	(Antigua and Barbuda) Ashley Nathaniel-George
FW	9	(England) Olufela Olomola	(substituted on) 90+3'
Manager:
(Republic of Ireland) Gary Waddock

Assistant referees:
Blake Antrobus (Manchester)
Alistair Nelson (Nottinghamshire)
Fourth official:
Matt Corlett (Liverpool)

Match rules

- 90 minutes.
- Penalty shoot-out if scores still level.
- Seven named substitutes.
- Maximum of five substitutions.

== Broadcasting ==
The match was televised live on TNT Sports 4 and HBO Max. Radio commentary was provided by BBC Essex.
