= 2022–23 Oxford United F.C. season =

English football club season

Oxford United
2022–23 season
- Owner: Sumrith Thanakarnjanasuth (until 27 September 2022); Erick Thohir & Anindya Bakrie (from 27 September 2022)
- Chairman: Sumrith Thanakarnjanasuth (until 27 September 2022); Grant Ferguson (from 27 September 2022)
- Manager: Karl Robinson (until 26 February); Liam Manning (from 11 March)
- Stadium: Kassam Stadium
- League One: 19th
- FA Cup: Third round
- EFL Cup: Second round
- EFL Trophy: Group stage
- Top goalscorer: League: Cameron Brannagan (9); All: Cameron Brannagan (12)
- Average home league attendance: 8,393

The 2022–23 season is the 129th season in the existence of Oxford United F. C. and the club's seventh consecutive season in League One. In addition to the league, they will also compete in the 2022–23 FA Cup, the 2022–23 EFL Cup and the 2022–23 EFL Trophy.

== Transfers ==
=== In ===
Date	Pos	Player	Transferred from	Fee	Ref
1 July 2022 (Note: The transfer was announced on 26 June, and would become official on 1 July, once his Cardiff City contract expired)	LB	(Northern Ireland) Ciaron Brown	(Wales) Cardiff City	Free transfer	
19 July 2022	CB	(Scotland) Stuart Findlay	(United States) Philadelphia Union	Undisclosed	
21 July 2022	GK	(Republic of Ireland) Edward McGinty	(Republic of Ireland) Sligo Rovers	Undisclosed	
22 July 2022	LW	(Suriname) Yanic Wildschut	(Bulgaria) CSKA Sofia	Undisclosed	
26 July 2022	LW	(England) Josh Murphy	(Wales) Cardiff City	Free transfer	
29 July 2022	RW	(England) Jodi Jones	(England) Coventry City	Free transfer	
1 September 2022	RM	(Netherlands) Djavan Anderson	(Italy) Lazio	Undisclosed	
1 January 2023 (Note: The transfer was announced on 15 December, and would become official on 1 January, once his Shelbourne contract expired)	CB	(Republic of Ireland) Stephan Negru	(Republic of Ireland) Shelbourne	Undisclosed	
12 January 2023	CB	(England) Teddy Mfuni	(England) Warrington Town	Undisclosed	

=== Out ===
Date	Pos	Player	Transferred to	Fee	Ref
16 June 2022	RM	(Australia) Ryan Williams	(Australia) Perth Glory	Undisclosed	
28 June 2022	CB	(Republic of Ireland) Luke McNally	(England) Burnley	Undisclosed	
30 June 2022	CM	(England) Leon Chambers-Parillon	(England) Hitchin Town	Released	
30 June 2022	LM	(Northern Ireland) Joel Cooper	(Northern Ireland) Linfield	Mutual consent	
30 June 2022	LB	(England) Michael Elechi	(England) Leatherhead	Released	
30 June 2022	DM	(England) Jamie Hanson	Unattached	Released	
30 June 2022 (Note: The transfer was announced on 16 May, and would become official on 1 July once his contract expired)	CM	(Republic of Ireland) Mark Sykes	(England) Bristol City	Free transfer	
30 June 2022	CF	(England) Sam Winnall	(England) Burton Albion	Released	
1 July 2022	CF	(England) Adam Smith	(England) Thame United	Free transfer	
11 July 2022	CB	(Nigeria) Clinton Nosakhare	(England) Thame United	Free transfer	
28 July 2022	RM	(Republic of Ireland) Anthony Forde	(Wales) Wrexham	Undisclosed	
12 October 2022	GK	(England) Mackenzie Chapman	(England) Bolton Wanderers	Free transfer	
20 January 2023	CB	(England) John Mousinho	Retired (Note: Appointed as head coach of Portsmouth.)	—N/a	

=== Loans in ===
Date	Pos	Player	Loaned from	On loan until	Ref
4 August 2022	CM	(England) Lewis Bate	(England) Leeds United	End of season	
11 August 2022	CF	(Scotland) Kyle Joseph	(Wales) Swansea City	End of season	
6 January 2023	LB	(England) Brandon Fleming	(England) Hull City	End of season	
30 January 2023	AM	(France) Ateef Konaté	(England) Nottingham Forest	End of season	
31 January 2023	CF	(England) Tyler Smith	(England) Hull City	End of season	

=== Loans out ===
Date	Pos	Player	Loaned to	On loan until	Ref
3 August 2022	CM	(Thailand) Ben Davis	(Thailand) Port	End of season	
11 August 2022	GK	(England) Jack Stevens	(England) Port Vale	End of season	
12 August 2022	GK	(England) Fraser Barnsley	(England) Evesham United	4 November 2022	(Note: On 4 October, Barnsley's loan at Evesham was extended by a further month.)
12 August 2022	MF	(England) Will Owens	(England) Banbury United	Youth loan	
12 August 2022	GK	(England) Kie Plumley	(England) Bowers & Pitsea	Youth loan	
7 September 2022	GK	(England) Eddie Brearey	(England) North Leigh	7 October 2022	
11 October 2022	LW	(England) Will Owens	(England) North Leigh	11 November 2022	
14 October 2022	CF	(Bulgaria) Slavi Spasov	(England) Banbury United	14 November 2022	
18 October 2022	GK	(England) Eddie Brearey	(England) Thame United	Youth loan	
21 October 2022	CM	(England) Joshua Johnson	(England) Dartford	21 November 2022	
25 October 2022	RB	(Israel) Yoav Sade	(England) North Leigh	25 November 2022	
5 January 2023	AM	(Northern Ireland) Oisin Smyth	(England) Solihull Moors	5 February 2023	
6 January 2023	DF	(Republic of Ireland) James Golding	(England) Banbury United	7 March 2023 (Note: On 7 February, Golding's loan at Banbury was extended by a further month)	
6 January 2023	LW	(England) Will Owens	(England) Bedford Town	3 February 2023	
6 January 2023	LB	(England) Steve Seddon	(England) Cambridge United	End of season	
26 January 2023	RW	(Malta) Jodi Jones	(England) Notts County	End of season	
31 January 2023	CF	(England) Matty Taylor	(England) Port Vale	End of season	
7 February 2023	LW	(England) Will Owens	(England) Evesham United	7 March 2023	
17 February 2023	CF	(Bulgaria) Slavi Spasov	(England) Banbury United		
23 March 2023	GK	(England) Fraser Barnsley	(England) Evesham United	End of season	
23 March 2023	GK	(England) Eddie Brearey	(England) St Ives Town	End of season	
23 March 2023	FW	(England) Aidan Elliott-Wheeler	(England) Banbury United	End of season	
23 March 2023	DF	(England) George Franklin	(England) North Leigh	End of season	
23 March 2023	DF	(England) Ibrahim Sankoh	(England) Evesham United	End of season	
23 March 2023	CB	(Albania) Erion Zabeli	(England) Salisbury	End of season	

== Pre-season and friendlies ==
Oxford United announced they would endure a pre-season training camp near Marbella in Spain. Six days later, the club confirmed their pre-season schedule with eight matches planned.

Win Draw Loss Fixtures

2 July 2022 Friendly	Oxford City	2–5	Oxford United	Marston
18:30 BST	McEachran 5'; Ewers-Humphrey 50'	Report	Brannagan 13', 34'; Henry 18'; Long 38'; Browne 59'	Stadium: Velocity Stadium; Attendance: 1,118

9 July 2022 Friendly	North Leigh	1–3	Oxford United	North Leigh
12:30 BST	James 48'	Report	McGuane 29'; Taylor 72' (pen.); Browne 79'	Stadium: Eynsham Park; Attendance: 525

9 July 2022 Friendly	Banbury United	1–2	Oxford United	Banbury
16:00 BST	Landers 66'	Report	Brannagan 11'; Goodrham 29'	Stadium: Spencer Stadium; Attendance: 954

12 July 2022 Friendly	Hungerford Town	1–2	Oxford United	Hungerford
19:45 BST	Rollinson 46'	Report	Smyth 28'; Davis 61'	Stadium: Bulpit Lane; Attendance: 538

13 July 2022 Friendly	Eastleigh	1–5	Oxford United	Eastleigh
19:45 BST	Whitehall 52'	Report	Browne 17', 23'; Seddon 57'; Brannagan 67' (pen.); Jones 71'	Stadium: Silverlake Stadium; Attendance: 636

16 July 2022 Friendly	Oxford United	0–2	Coventry City	Littlemore
15:00 BST		Report	Panzo 30', 59'	Stadium: Kassam Stadium; Attendance: 2,689

19 July 2022 Friendly	Oxford United	0–3	West Bromwich Albion	Littlemore
19:45 BST		Report	Grant 80', 84'; Sade 88' (o.g.)	Stadium: Kassam Stadium; Attendance: 2,422

23 July 2022 Friendly	AFC Wimbledon	0–0	Oxford United	Wimbledon
15:00 BST		Report		Stadium: Cherry Red Records Stadium

== Competitions ==
=== Overall record ===
Competition	First match	Last match	Starting round	Final position	Record							
Competition	First match	Last match	Starting round	Final position	Pld	W	D	L	GF	GA	GD	Win %
League One	30 July 2022	May 2023	Matchday 1	19th	46	11	14	21	49	56	−7	23.91
FA Cup	TBC	TBC	Third round	Third Round	3	2	0	1	6	5	+1	66.67
EFL Cup	9 August 2022	TBC	First round	Second Round	2	0	1	1	2	4	−2	0.00
EFL Trophy	30 August 2022	TBC	Group stage	Group Stage	3	1	0	2	6	4	+2	33.33
Total					54	14	15	25	63	69	−6	25.93

Last updated: pre-season
Source: [ Soccerway]

=== League One ===
==== League table ====
Pos	Team	Pld	W	D	L	GF	GA	GD	Pts	Promotion, qualification or relegation
16	Cheltenham Town	46	14	12	20	45	61	−16	54	
17	Bristol Rovers	46	14	11	21	58	73	−15	53	
18	Port Vale	46	13	10	23	48	71	−23	49	
19	Oxford United	46	11	14	21	49	56	−7	47	
20	Cambridge United	46	13	7	26	41	68	−27	46	
21	Milton Keynes Dons (R)	46	11	12	23	44	66	−22	45	Relegation to EFL League Two
22	Morecambe (R)	46	10	14	22	47	78	−31	44	Relegation to EFL League Two

Source: EFL Official Website
Rules for classification: 1) Points; 2) Goal difference; 3) Number of goals scored; 4) Head-to-head results; 5) Wins; 6) Away goals; 7) Penalty points (sec 9.5); 8) 12-point sending off offences
(R) Relegated

==== Results summary ====
Overall								Home						Away					
Pld	W	D	L	GF	GA	GD	Pts	W	D	L	GF	GA	GD	W	D	L	GF	GA	GD
46	11	14	21	49	56	−7	47	6	5	12	29	31	−2	5	9	9	20	25	−5

Last updated: 7 May 2023.
Source: [ Soccerway]

==== Results by round ====
Round	1	2	3	4	5	6	7	8	9	10	11	12	13	14	15	16	17	18	19	20	21	22	23	24	25	26	27	28	29	30	31	32	33	34	35	36	37	38	39	40	41	42	43	44	45	46
Ground	A	H	A	H	H	A	H	A	H	A	H	A	H	A	A	H	A	H	H	A	A	A	H	H	A	H	A	A	H	H	A	H	A	H	A	H	A	A	H	A	H	H	A	H	A	H
Result	L	W	L	L	D	W	W	L	L	D	L	W	L	D	W	D	D	W	D	D	D	L	W	L	W	W	L	L	L	L	D	L	L	L	L	L	D	D	D	D	L	D	L	W	W	L
Position	23	16	20	19	19	17	11	15	17	18	20	19	19	20	18	17	16	12	13	13	15	15	13	14	13	10	12	14	14	15	16	16	17	17	17	19	19	20	20	20	20	20	20	19	19	19

Updated to match(es) played on 7 May 2023. Source: [ Soccerway]
A = Away; H = Home; W = Win; D = Draw; L = Loss; P = Postponed

==== Matches ====
Win Draw Loss Fixtures

On 23 June, the league fixtures were announced.

30 July 2022 1	Derby County	1–0	Oxford United	Derby
15:00 BST	Hourihane (yellow card) 47', (goal) 80'; Collins (yellow card) 55'; Mendez-Laing (yellow card) 82'; Davies (yellow card) 90+7'	Report	Seddon (yellow card) 28'; Browne (yellow card) 51'	Stadium: Pride Park; Attendance: 31,053 (3,147 away); Referee: Anthony Backhouse

6 August 2022 2	Oxford United	1–0	Cambridge United	Littlemore
15:00 BST	Findlay (yellow card) 18'; Browne (yellow card) 47'; Goodrham 90+3'	Report	Dunk (yellow card) 36'	Stadium: Kassam Stadium; Attendance: 8,057 (595 away); Referee: Tom Reeves

13 August 2022 3	Bristol Rovers	1–0	Oxford United	Horfield
12:30 BST	Marquis 34'; Saunders (yellow card) 65'; Grant (yellow card) 90+2'	Report	Seddon (yellow card) 29'; Moore (yellow card) 40'; Brannagan (yellow card) 90+3'	Stadium: Memorial Stadium; Attendance: 8,297 (885 away); Referee: Oliver Langford

16 August 2022 4	Oxford United	1–2	Lincoln City	Littlemore
19:45 BST	Seddon (yellow card) 36'; Taylor (yellow card) 38'; Brannagan 69' (pen.)	Report	Hopper 21'; Scully 45+1'; Roughan (yellow card) 81'; Sørensen (yellow card) 88'; Eyoma (yellow card) 90+2'	Stadium: Kassam Stadium; Attendance: 6,912 (326 away); Referee: Sam Barrott

20 August 2022 5	Oxford United	1–1	Morecambe	Littlemore
15:00 BST	Joseph 56'; Rodríguez (yellow card) 89'; Brown (yellow card) 90+7'	Report	Weir 48'; Stockton (yellow card) 51'; Fané (yellow card) 70'; Rawson (yellow card) 79'; Connolly (yellow card) 90+1'	Stadium: Kassam Stadium; Attendance: 6,813 (130 away); Referee: Ben Speedie

27 August 2022 6	Cheltenham Town	1–2	Oxford United	Cheltenham
15:00 BST	Chapman (yellow card) 43' (yellow-red card) 90+3'; Perry 63'; Taylor (yellow card) 84'; Ferry (yellow card) 90'; Lloyd (yellow card) 90+3'; Norton (yellow card) 90+4'	Report	Joseph (yellow card) 61'; Brannagan 66', 86' (pen.), (yellow card) 90+4'; Bodin (yellow card) 70' (yellow-red card) 74'; Taylor (yellow card) 90'	Stadium: Whaddon Road Ground; Attendance: 4,554 (1,209 away); Referee: Charles Breakspear

3 September 2022 7	Oxford United	2–1	Burton Albion	Littlemore
15:00 BST	Brannagan 48'; Joseph 71'; Findlay (yellow card) 86'	Report	Hughes (yellow card) 58'; Brayford (yellow card) 60'; Adeboyejo 77'	Stadium: Kassam Stadium; Attendance: 7,560 (141 away); Referee: Bobby Madden

10 September 2022	Shrewsbury Town	Postponed	Oxford United	Shrewsbury
15:00 BST				Stadium: Montgomery Waters Meadow
Note: Fixture was postponed as a mark of respect following the death of Elizabeth II.

13 September 2022 8	Plymouth Argyle	1–0	Oxford United	Plymouth
19:45 BST	Randell (yellow card) 42'; Whittaker 70'	Report	Findlay (yellow card) 66'; Brown (yellow card) 80'	Stadium: Home Park; Attendance: 12,563 (309 away); Referee: Craig Hicks

17 September 2022 9	Oxford United	1–2	Milton Keynes Dons	Littlemore
15:00 BST	Mousinho 89'	Report	Smith 44'; McEachran (yellow card) 59'; Grigg 84' (pen.)	Stadium: Kassam Stadium; Attendance: 8,141 (715 away); Referee: Andrew Kitchen

24 September 2022	Oxford United	Postponed	Fleetwood Town	Littlemore
15:00 BST				Stadium: Kassam Stadium
Note: Fixture was postponed because of international call-ups.

1 October 2022 10	Charlton Athletic	1–1	Oxford United	Charlton
15:00 BST	Lavelle (yellow card) 19'; Dobson (yellow card) 42'; Inniss (yellow card) 52'; Stockley 55'	Report	Browne 11'; McGuane (yellow card) 54'	Stadium: The Valley; Attendance: 12,806; Referee: Bobby Madley

8 October 2022 11	Oxford United	0–1	Wycombe Wanderers	Littlemore
15:00 BST	Brannagan (penalty missed) 13'; Joseph (yellow card) 53'; Henry (yellow card) 56'	Report	Forino-Joseph 33'; Jacobson (yellow card) 45+1'; Wing (yellow card) 51'; McCarthy (yellow card) 55'	Stadium: Kassam Stadium; Attendance: 10,007; Referee: Keith Stroud

15 October 2022 12	Exeter City	2–4	Oxford United	Exeter
15:00 BST	Collins (yellow card) 11'; Sweeney (yellow card) 30'; Brown 65'; Stansfield (yellow card) 69'; Cox 90+2'	Report	Brannagan 12' (yellow card) 21'; Long 31'; Joseph 44' 54'	Stadium: St James Park; Attendance: 6,926; Referee: Christopher Pollard

22 October 2022 13	Oxford United	1–2	Peterborough United	Littlemore
15:00 BST	Bodin 52'; Taylor (red card) 57'; Browne (yellow card) 62'; Moore (yellow card) 63'; Goodrham (yellow card) 86'	Report	Taylor 7'; Kyprianou (yellow card) 23'; Poku 31'; Edwards (yellow card) 57'; Butler (yellow card) 90+1'	Stadium: Kassam Stadium; Attendance: 8,210; Referee: Andy Woolmer

25 October 2022 14	Portsmouth	1–1	Oxford United	Milton
19:45 BST	Curtis (yellow card) 45+2'; Bishop 78'	Report	Joseph 16'; Bodin (yellow card) 41' (yellow-red card) 71'; Findlay (yellow card) 65'; O'Donkor (yellow card) 69'; Goodrham (yellow card) 85'	Stadium: Fratton Park; Attendance: 18,277; Referee: Sam Purkiss

29 October 2022 15	Bolton Wanderers	1–3	Oxford United	Horwich
15:00 BST	Williams (yellow card) 20'; Santos (yellow card) 69'; Charles 73'	Report	Anderson 25'; O'Donkor (yellow card) 29'; Brannagan (yellow card) 31'; McGuane (yellow card) 35'; Brown 53'; Seddon 79', (yellow card) 90+1'; Rodríguez (yellow card) 85'	Stadium: University of Bolton Stadium; Attendance: 17,281; Referee: Ollie Yates

1 November 2022 16	Oxford United	1–1	Fleetwood Town	Littlemore
19:45 GMT	Browne (yellow card) 21'; O'Donkor 50'; Seddon (yellow card) 78'; Moore (yellow card) 90+9'	Report	Mendes Gomes 2'; Warrington (yellow card) 21'; Andrew (yellow card) 34'; Batty (yellow card) 45'	Stadium: Kassam Stadium; Attendance: 6,286; Referee: Alan Young

9 November 2022 17	Shrewsbury Town	1–1	Oxford United	Shrewsbury
19:45 GMT	Moore (yellow card) 11'; Flanagan (yellow card) 33'; Bennett (yellow card) 45+6'; Pennington 65'	Report	Brannagan 15' (yellow card) 22'; Moore (yellow card) 88'	Stadium: Montgomery Waters Meadow; Attendance: 5,158; Referee: Darren Drysdale

12 November 2022 18	Oxford United	4–0	Port Vale	Littlemore
15:00 GMT	Bodin 10', 62'; Taylor 27', 66'; Henry (yellow card) 44'	Report	Robinson (yellow card) 35'; Conlon (yellow card) 39'; Harrison (yellow card) 87'	Stadium: Kassam Stadium; Attendance: 8,198; Referee: David Rock

19 November 2022 19	Oxford United	1–1	Forest Green Rovers	Littlemore
15:00 GMT	Boyes 14' (o.g.); Long (yellow card) 45+3'	Report	Bernard (yellow card) 38'; March (yellow card) 51'; Matt 60', (yellow card) 74'; Peart-Harris (yellow card) 88'; Casey (yellow card) 90+9'; Marques (yellow card) 90+9'	Stadium: Kassam Stadium; Attendance: 7,813; Referee: Simon Mather

3 December 2022 20	Accrington Stanley	1–1	Oxford United	Accrington
15:00 GMT	Tharme (yellow card) 35'; Astley (yellow card) 57'; Leigh (yellow card) 62'; Hamilton 84'; Pritchard (yellow card) 86'	Report	Henry 58'; Brown (yellow card) 73'; Murphy (yellow card) 78'	Stadium: Wham Stadium; Attendance: 2,447; Referee: Sam Barrott

10 December 2022	Oxford United	Postponed	Barnsley	Littlemore
15:00 GMT				Stadium: Kassam Stadium
Note: Fixture was postponed because of a frozen pitch.

17 December 2022 21	Sheffield Wednesday	0–0	Oxford United	Owlerton
15:00 GMT	Paterson (yellow card) 27'; Bakinson (yellow card) 30'; Gregory (yellow card) 65'	Report	Bate (yellow card) 29'; Murphy (penalty missed) 90+7'	Stadium: Hillsborough; Attendance: 22,285; Referee: Seb Stockbridge

26 December 2022 22	Ipswich Town	3–0	Oxford United	Ipswich
15:00 GMT	Ladapo 39'; Burns 45'; Chaplin 81'; Vincent-Young (yellow card) 90+1'	Report	Taylor (yellow card) 36'; Henry (yellow card) 51'	Stadium: Portman Road; Attendance: 28,072; Referee: Will Finnie

29 December 2022 23	Oxford United	3–1	Charlton Athletic	Littlemore
19:45 GMT	Bodin 20'; Taylor 24'; O'Donkor 82'	Report	Chin (yellow card) 45'; Leaburn (yellow card) 66', (goal) 67'; Payne (yellow card) 77'	Stadium: Kassam Stadium; Attendance: 8,889; Referee: Ben Toner

1 January 2023 24	Oxford United	0–1	Exeter City	Littlemore
15:00 GMT	Brown (yellow card) 75'	Report	Nombe 79'; Sparkes (yellow card) 84'; Stansfield (yellow card) 90+1'; Collins (yellow card) 90+2'; Blackman (yellow card) 90+5'	Stadium: Kassam Stadium; Attendance: 8,604; Referee: Darren Drysdale

14 January 2023 25	Fleetwood Town	1–2	Oxford United	Fleetwood
15:00 GMT	Sarpong-Wiredu 44'; Nsiala (yellow card) 90+7'	Report	Joseph 62'; Long (yellow card) 72'; Brown 90'; Goodrham (yellow card) 90+5'; Moore (yellow card) 90+7'	Stadium: Highbury Stadium; Attendance: 3,132; Referee: James Oldham

21 January 2023 26	Oxford United	2–1	Ipswich Town	Littlemore
15:00 GMT	Wildschut 34'; Brannagan 83'	Report	Davis 38'; Donacien (yellow card) 81'	Stadium: Kassam Stadium; Attendance: 9,830; Referee: Bobby Madden

24 January 2023 27	Wycombe Wanderers	2–0	Oxford United	High Wycombe
19:45 GMT	Vokes 19'; Mehmeti 34'; Stryjek (yellow card) 56'; Thompson (yellow card) 88'	Report	Anderson (yellow card) 25'	Stadium: Adams Park; Attendance: 5,935; Referee: Neil Hair

28 January 2023 28	Burton Albion	2–0	Oxford United	Burton upon Trent
15:00 GMT	Eastwood 40' (o.g.); Taylor 49'	Report	Goodrham (yellow card) 79'	Stadium: Pirelli Stadium; Attendance: 2,993; Referee: Adam Herczeg

1 February 2023 29	Oxford United	1–2	Barnsley	Littlemore
15:00 GMT	Moore 71'	Report	Thomas 30'; Cadden 58'; Kane (yellow card) 69'; Connell (yellow card) 75'; Collins (yellow card) 81'; Martin (yellow card) 90+1'	Stadium: Kassam Stadium; Attendance: 7,381; Referee: Lee Swabey

4 February 2023 30	Oxford United	0–1	Shrewsbury Town	Littlemore
15:00 GMT	Long (yellow card) 83'; Moore (yellow card) 88'	Report	Phillips (yellow card) 35'; Flanagan (yellow card) 55'; Shipley (yellow card) 66'; Bowman 74'	Stadium: Kassam Stadium; Attendance: 7,597; Referee: Scott Oldham

11 February 2023 31	Milton Keynes Dons	1–1	Oxford United	Denbigh
15:00 GMT	Kaikai 25'; Maghoma (yellow card) 53'	Report	Fleming (yellow card) 13'; Brannagan (yellow card) 59'; Bate 71'	Stadium: Stadium MK; Attendance: 9,116; Referee: Andrew Kitchen

14 February 2023 32	Oxford United	1–3	Plymouth Argyle	Littlemore
19:45 GMT	Brannagan 44', (yellow card) 56'; McGuane (yellow card) 62'; Fleming (yellow card) 64'	Report	Matete (yellow card) 9'; Butcher 19'; Lonwijk (yellow card) 43'; Earley 65', (yellow card) 81'; Cosgrove (yellow card) 70'; Burton (yellow card) 90+2'; Hardie 90+3'	Stadium: Kassam Stadium; Attendance: 8,242 (1,490 away); Referee: Alan Young

18 February 2023 33	Cambridge United	1–0	Oxford United	Cambridge
15:00 GMT	Jones 8', (yellow card) 83'; Bennett (yellow card) 73'; Ironside (yellow card) 90+2'	Report	Baldock (yellow card) 29'	Stadium: Abbey Stadium; Attendance: 6,613 (785 away); Referee: Ollie Yates

25 February 2023 34	Oxford United	0–3	Bristol Rovers	Littlemore
12:30 GMT	Bate (yellow card) 37'; Brannagan (yellow card) 67'	Report	Sinclair 22' (pen.); Collins 28', (yellow card) 40'; Quansah (yellow card) 55'; Hoole 75'	Stadium: Kassam Stadium; Attendance: 8,437 (1,437 away); Referee: Charles Breakspear

4 March 2023 35	Lincoln City	1–0	Oxford United	Lincoln
15:00 GMT	Mandroiu 23' (pen.)	Report	Browne (yellow card) 33'; Moore (yellow card) 87'	Stadium: LNER Stadium; Attendance: 8,092 (594 away); Referee: Lewis Smith

11 March 2023 36	Oxford United	2–3	Derby County	Littlemore
15:00 GMT	Long 14'; Brown (yellow card) 39'; Joseph 90'	Report	Sibley 23', 40'; Smith (yellow card) 59'; Long 61' (o.g.)	Stadium: Kassam Stadium; Attendance: 9,706 (1,479 away); Referee: Marc Edwards

18 March 2023 37	Morecambe	1–1	Oxford United	Morecambe
15:00 GMT	Mayor (yellow card) 4'; Simeu (yellow card) 67'; Crowley (yellow card) 83'; Hunter 87'	Report	Browne 41', (yellow card) 45+2'	Stadium: The Mazuma Stadium; Attendance: 4,260 (543 away); Referee: Sam Barrott

25 March 2023	Cheltenham Town	Postponed	Oxford United	Cheltenham
15:00 GMT				Stadium: The Completely Suzuki Stadium
Note: Fixture was postponed because of international call-ups within the Cheltenham squad.

1 April 2023 38	Peterborough United	0–0	Oxford United	Peterborough
15:00 BST		Report	Joseph (yellow card) 77'	Stadium: Weston Homes Stadium; Attendance: 11,199 (847 away); Referee: Thomas Kirk

7 April 2023 39	Oxford United	1–1	Sheffield Wednesday	Littlemore
15:00 BST	McGuane (yellow card) 64'; Brannagan 70' (pen.); O'Donkor (yellow card) 89'	Report	Vaulks (yellow card) 27'; Bannan 35'; Famewo (yellow card) 37'	Stadium: Kassam Stadium; Attendance: 10,238 (1,482 away); Referee: Rebecca Welch

10 April 2023 40	Port Vale	0–0	Oxford United	Burslem
15:00 BST	Massey (yellow card) 44'; Smith (yellow card) 45'; Benning (yellow card) 45+4'; Pett (yellow card) 60'; Worrall (yellow card) 74'; Politic (red card) 90+2'	Report	McGuane (yellow card) 58'; Joseph (yellow card) 74'	Stadium: Vale Park; Attendance: 6,662 (975 away); Referee: Martin Woods

15 April 2023 41	Oxford United	0–1	Bolton Wanderers	Littlemore
15:00 BST	Murphy (yellow card) 36'; O'Donkor (yellow card) 90+4'	Report	Charles 7'; Trafford (yellow card) 38'; Williams (yellow card) 45'; Johnston (yellow card) 56'; Sheehan (yellow card) 60'; Kachunga (yellow card) 64'	Stadium: Kassam Stadium; Attendance: 9,506 (1,344 away); Referee: Sebastian Stockbridge

18 April 2023 42	Oxford United	1–1	Portsmouth	Littlemore
19:45 BST	Long 37'; Brannagan (yellow card) 52'	Report	Lane (yellow card) 20'; Pack 26'; Bernard (yellow card) 33'; Lowery (yellow card) 43'; Raggett (yellow card) 45'; Rafferty (yellow card) 69'; Thompson (yellow card) 90+2'	Stadium: Kassam Stadium; Attendance: 8,345 (1,460 away); Referee: Declan Bourne

22 April 2023 43	Barnsley	2–0	Oxford United	Barnsley
15:00 BST	Connell (yellow card) 37'; Tedić 45+1', 51'	Report	Smyth (yellow card) 37'; Goodrham (yellow card) 50'; Brannagan (yellow card) 89'; Murphy (yellow card) 90+2'	Stadium: Oakwell Stadium; Attendance: 12,291 (663 away); Referee: Ross Joyce

25 April 2023 44	Oxford United	4–0	Cheltenham Town	Littlemore
19:45 BST	Goodrham 38'; Joseph 52'; Browne 60', 65'	Report	Broom (yellow card) 45+3'; Ferry (yellow card) 75'; Rea (yellow card) 86'	Stadium: Kassam Stadium; Attendance: 7,757; Referee: Will Finnie

29 April 2023 45	Forest Green Rovers	0–3	Oxford United	Nailsworth
15:00 BST		Report	Joseph 11'; Goodrham 46'; Bodin 68'	Stadium: The New Lawn; Attendance: 4,070 (1,224 away); Referee: Tom Reeves

7 May 2023 46	Oxford United	1–2	Accrington Stanley	Littlemore
15:00 BST	Bodin 8'; Joseph (yellow card) 79'	Report	Adedoyin 64'; Pressley 85'; Coyle (yellow card) 57'; Hamilton (yellow card) 90'	Stadium: Kassam Stadium; Attendance: 10,499 (265 away); Referee: Sam Allison

=== FA Cup ===
The U's were drawn away to Woking in the first round, then at home to Exeter City in the second round and Arsenal in the third round.

Win Draw Loss Fixtures

16 November 2022 First round	Woking	1–2	Oxford United	Woking
15:00 BST	Ince 43'; Moss (yellow card) 65'	Report	Bodin 39'; Goodrham 53'; Moore (yellow card) 76'; O'Donkor (yellow card) 90+6'	Stadium: The Laithwaite Community Stadium; Attendance: 4,173; Referee: Craig Hicks
Note: Fixture was postponed on 5 November because of a waterlogged pitch.

26 November 2022 Second round	Oxford United	4–1	Exeter City	Littlemore
15:00 GMT	Taylor 9', (yellow card) 75'; McGuane (yellow card) 52'; Bodin 79', 88'; Brannagan 85'	Report	Hartridge (yellow card) 22'; Sparkes (yellow card) 37'; Key (yellow card) 71'; Jay 89'	Stadium: Kassam Stadium; Attendance: 3,599; Referee: Will Finnie

9 January 2023 Third round	Oxford United	0–3	Arsenal	Littlemore
20:00 GMT	Brown (yellow card) 59'	Report	Elneny 63'; Nketiah 70', 76'	Stadium: Kassam Stadium; Attendance: 11,538; Referee: David Coote

=== EFL Cup ===
Win Draw Loss Fixtures

Oxford were drawn at home against Swansea City in the first round and to Crystal Palace in the second round.

9 August 2022 First round	Oxford United	2–2 (5–3 p)	Swansea City	Littlemore
19:45 BST	McGinty (yellow card) 7'; Browne (yellow card) 65'; Gorrin 72'; Brannagan 90+3'	Report	Fulton 8'; Cullen 25' (yellow card) 82'; Sorinola (yellow card) 76'	Stadium: Kassam Stadium; Attendance: 4,373 (873 away); Referee: Thomas Bramall
	Penalties
	Browne (penalty scored); Gorrin (penalty scored); McGuane (penalty scored); Spasov (penalty scored); Brannagan (penalty scored)		Cullen (penalty scored); Ntcham (penalty scored); Allen (penalty scored); Sorinola (penalty missed)

23 August 2022 Second round	Oxford United	0–2	Crystal Palace	Littlemore
19:45 BST	McGinty (yellow card) 6'; Bate (yellow card) 51'; Johnson (yellow card) 55'; Long (yellow card) 69'; Brannagan (yellow card) 80'	Report	Mateta (yellow card) 26'; Milivojević (yellow card) 58', (goal) 90' (pen.); Édouard 71'	Stadium: Kassam Stadium; Attendance: 9,564 (1,352 away); Referee: Peter Bankes

=== EFL Trophy ===
On 20 June, the initial Group stage draw was made, grouping Oxford United with Leyton Orient and Sutton United. Three days later, Chelsea U21s joined Southern Group G.

Pos	Div	Team	Pld	W	PW	PL	L	GF	GA	GD	Pts	Qualification
1	ACA	Chelsea U21	3	2	0	0	1	5	4	+1	6	Advance to Round 2
2	L2	Sutton United	3	2	0	0	1	4	3	+1	6	Advance to Round 2
3	L1	Oxford United	3	1	0	0	2	6	4	+2	3	
4	L2	Leyton Orient	3	1	0	0	2	5	9	−4	3	

Source: EFL.com

Win Draw Loss Fixtures

30 August 2022 Group stage	Oxford United	5–0	Leyton Orient	Littlemore
19:45 BST	Mousinho 4'; Brannagan 45+3'; Joseph 57'; Findlay 66'; Taylor 84'	Report	Sotiriou (yellow card) 70'	Stadium: The Kassam Stadium; Attendance: 1,373 (132 away); Referee: Tom Nield

4 October 2022 Group stage	Oxford United	1–2	Chelsea U21	Littlemore
19:45 BST	Taylor 10'; Rodríguez (yellow card) 26'; Bate (yellow card) 42'	Report	Webster (yellow card) 52'; Hutchinson (penalty missed) 67'; Burstow 78'; Hall 82'; Beach (yellow card) 90+2'	Stadium: Kassam Stadium; Attendance: 1,354; Referee: Carl Brook

18 October 2022 Group stage	Sutton United	2–0	Oxford United	Sutton
19:45 BST	Rowe 48'; Kouassi 64' (pen.); Lovatt (yellow card) 67'; Bugiel (yellow card) 74'	Report		Stadium: VBS Community Stadium; Attendance: 971; Referee: Sunny Gill

== Top scorers ==
As of 13 June 2023

Place	Position	Nation	Number	Name	League One	FA Cup	League Cup	FL Trophy	Total
1	MF	(England)	8	Cameron Brannagan	9	1	1	1	12
2	FW	(England)	22	Kyle Joseph	9	0	0	1	10
3	FW	(Wales)	7	Billy Bodin	6	3	0	0	9
4	FW	(England)	9	Matty Taylor	3	1	0	1	5
5	FW	(England)	11	Marcus Browne	4	0	0	0	4
5	FW	(England)	27	Tyler Goodrham	3	1	0	0	4
TOTALS					34	5	1	3	43
