= Chris Wreh =

American soccer player (born 1996)

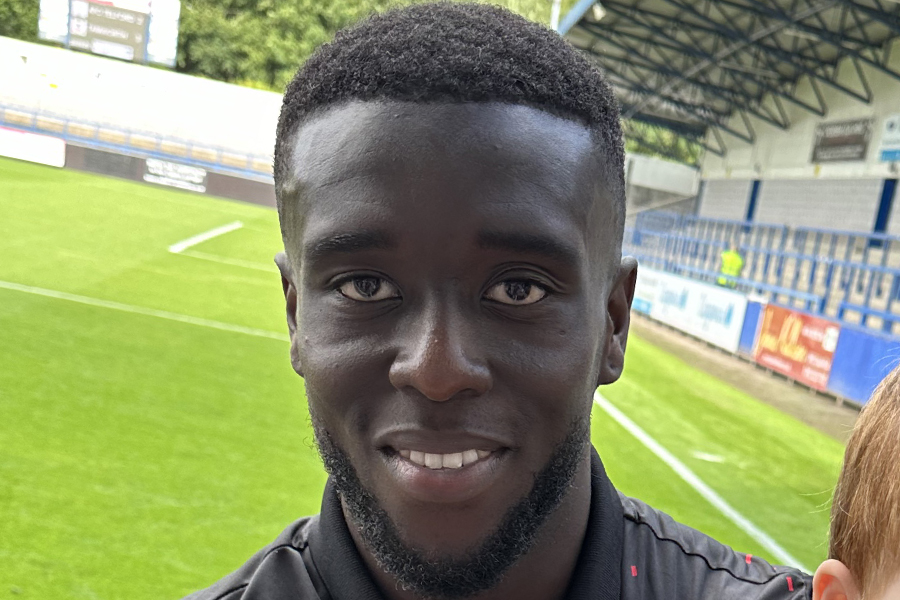
- Wreh in August 2024

Personal information
- Full name: Christopher Myers Wreh
- Date of birth: August 5, 1996 (age 30)
- Place of birth: New York City, United States
- Height: 1.83 m (6 ft 0 in)
- Position: Striker

Team information
- Current team: Banbury United (on loan from Bedford Town)

Youth career
- 2011–2014: Northampton Town

Senior career*
| Years | Team | Apps | (Gls) |
| 2014–2016 | Stony Stratford Town | 59 | (30) |
| 2015 | → Barton Rovers (loan) | 1 | (1) |
| 2016 | AFC Rushden & Diamonds | 3 | (0) |
| 2016–2017 | Aylesbury | 4 | (0) |
| 2017 | MK Gallacticos | 19 | (9) |
| 2017–2018 | Newport Pagnell Town | 2 | (0) |
| 2018–2019 | Dunstable Town | 33 | (10) |
| 2019–2020 | Stratford Town | 23 | (7) |
| 2020 | Rushall Olympic | 8 | (1) |
| 2020 | AFC Rushden & Diamonds | 7 | (4) |
| 2020–2021 | MK Gallacticos | 2 | (1) |
| 2021–2022 | Banbury United | 40 | (21) |
| 2022–2023 | Southend United | 27 | (4) |
| 2023–2024 | Hartlepool United | 12 | (0) |
| 2023–2024 | → Tamworth (loan) | 18 | (6) |
| 2024–2025 | Tamworth | 17 | (3) |
| 2025 | → Scunthorpe United (loan) | 5 | (0) |
| 2025 | Maidenhead United | 3 | (0) |
| 2025 | Hereford | 4 | (0) |
| 2025– | Bedford Town | 1 | (0) |
| 2025– | → Banbury United (loan) | 33 | (5) |
- * Club domestic league appearances and goals as of 14:19, 22 May 2026 (UTC)

Christopher Myers Wreh (August 5, 1996) is an American soccer player who plays as a striker for Banbury United on loan from National League North club Bedford Town.

== Early life ==
As a youth player, Wreh joined the youth academy of English side Northampton Town. While playing for the club, he was teammates with English footballer Callum Powell, who he would later reunite with after signing for English side Southend United in 2016.

== Career ==
Wreh began his senior career with Stony Stratford Town. He also played for Barton Rovers. In 2016, he signed for English side AFC Rushden & Diamonds. He was described as having "failed to spark" while playing for the club. Wreh then played for Aylesbury, Spartan South Midlands Football League Division Two club MK Gallacticos, Newport Pagnell Town, Dunstable Town, Stratford Town and Rushall Olympic. He then returned to both AFC Rushden & Diamonds and MK Gallacticos. After that, he signed for English side Banbury United. With 21 goals, he helped the club achieve promotion from the Southern Football League Premier Division Central. In summer 2022, he moved up to the National League, signing for Southend United. The following season, he joined Hartlepool United. During that season, he was sent on loan to Tamworth, who he then joined permanently in summer 2024. In February 2025, he joined Scunthorpe United on an initial one-month loan. The following month, he joined Maidenhead United on a contract until the end of the season. After three appearances, he left the club at the end of the campaign after relegation. On 23 July 2025, Wreh signed for National League North club Hereford. He was released by Hereford on 26 August after just four substitute appearances. The following week, he joined Bedford Town before dual registering with Banbury United.

== Personal life ==
He is the son of Liberian former footballer Christopher Wreh.

In January 2025, after playing an FA Cup game for Tamworth against Tottenham Hotspur, Wreh received anonymous racist messages on Instagram. In June, the sender was convicted and banned from attending matches for three years. Wreh had refused to play for Tamworth after the abuse, as the club did not make a statement supporting him.

== Honors ==
Tamworth

- National League North: 2023–24
