= Lewis Bate =

English footballer (born 2002)

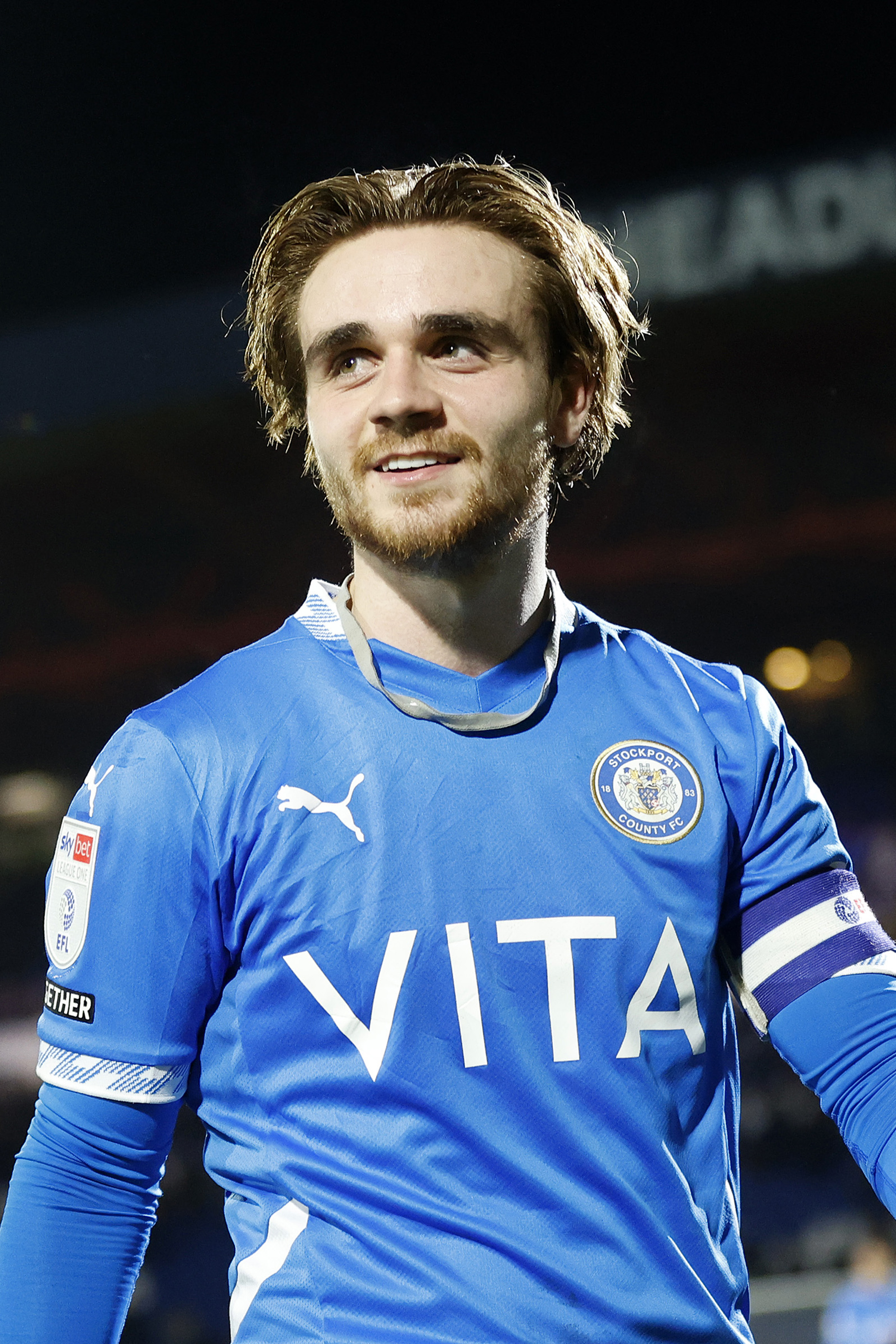
- Lewis Bate in action for Stockport County

Personal information
- Full name: Lewis Michael Bate
- Date of birth: 29 October 2002 (age 24)
- Place of birth: Sidcup, London, England
- Height: 1.72 m (5 ft 8 in)
- Position: Midfielder

Team information
- Current team: Stockport County
- Number: 4

Youth career
- 2009–2011: Foots Cray Lions
- 2011–2021: Chelsea

Senior career*
Years	Team	Apps	(Gls)
2021–2024	Leeds United	3	(0)
2022–2023	→ Oxford United (loan)	28	(1)
2024	→ Milton Keynes Dons (loan)	20	(0)
2024–	Stockport County	58	(2)

International career^{‡}
2018–2019	England U17	7	(0)
2019	England U18	2	(0)
2021–2022	England U20	4	(1)
- * Club domestic league appearances and goals as of 00:09, 25 October 2026 (UTC) ‡ National team caps and goals as of 17:14, 12 November 2021 (UTC)

Lewis Michael Bate (born 28 October 2002) is an English professional footballer who plays as a midfielder and captains EFL League One club Stockport County.

== Early life ==
Born in London, Bate started his career with local Sidcup-based side Foots Cray Lions, before joining Chelsea at under-8 level. He has listed Chelsea and Liverpool legends Frank Lampard and Steven Gerrard as players he looked up to as a child.

== Club career ==
=== Chelsea ===
After playing a key role for Chelsea's under-18 and under-23 sides, Bate was included on the bench for the Chelsea first team three times. However, he did not feature for the first team, and was linked with a move away from Stamford Bridge in 2021, having rejected a contract offer with The Blues.

=== Leeds United ===
On 21 July 2021, Leeds United announced the signing of Bate on a three-year contract for an undisclosed fee believed to be £1.5 million. Since signing, Bate has been tipped to be fast-tracked into the first team squad after impressing at under-23 level. He scored his first goal for Leeds under-23s on 4 November 2021 in a 5–3 EFL Trophy loss to Salford City. Bate made his senior debut for Leeds United on 9 January 2022 in the starting line-up for the 2–0 FA Cup third round defeat to West Ham United. He made his Premier League debut the following week, also at West Ham, when he came on as a first half replacement for Adam Forshaw, but was taken off midway through the second half, with Leeds 3–2 ahead, in a tactical substitution for Rodrigo.

Bate was released by Leeds in June 2024 at the conclusion of his contract.

==== Oxford United (loan) ====
On 4 August 2022, Bate joined Oxford United of League One on loan for the duration of the 2022–23 season. He suffered a hand injury in a game against Derby County on 11 March 2023 and, apart from a brief substitute appearance in the following game, was not expected to make further appearances. Before his injury he had made 26 league appearances, scoring once.

==== Milton Keynes Dons (loan) ====
On 19 January 2024, Bate joined League Two club Milton Keynes Dons until the end of the 2023–24 season.

=== Stockport County ===
On 20 June 2024 it was announced that Lewis had signed a three-year contract with Stockport County. He was handed the captain's armband ahead of the 2024–25 season.

== International career ==
Bate has represented England at under-17, under-18 and under-20 level. He scored his first goal for the England under-20s in a 1–1 draw with Italy.

== Style of play ==
A strong passer and dribbler, while also being good in a tackle, Bate can play in numerous midfield roles. He has been described as strong both defensively and going forward, and has been compared to former Netherlands international footballer Clarence Seedorf for his ability to control play.

== Career statistics ==
As of match played 24 October 2026

Appearances and goals by club, season and competition
Club	Season	League			FA Cup		EFL Cup		Other		Total	
Club	Season	Division	Apps	Goals	Apps	Goals	Apps	Goals	Apps	Goals	Apps	Goals
Chelsea U21	2020-21	—			—		—		2 (Note: Appearance(s) in EFL Trophy)	0	2	0
Leeds United U21	2021-22	—			—		—		2	1	2	1
Leeds United	2021-22	Premier League	3	0	1	0	0	0	—		4	0
Leeds United	2022-23	Premier League	0	0	0	0	0	0	—		0	0
Leeds United	2023-24	Championship	0	0	0	0	1	0	0	0	1	0
Leeds United	Total		3	0	1	0	1	0	0	0	5	0
Oxford United (loan)	2022-23	League One	28	1	3	0	2	0	2	0	35	1
MK Dons (loan)	2023-24	League Two	20	0	—		—		2 (Note: Appearance(s) in EFL League Two play-offs)	0	22	0
Stockport County	2024-25	League One	32	2	1	0	0	0	3 (Note: Two appearances in EFL Trophy, one appearance in EFL League One play-offs)	0	36	2
Stockport County	2025-26	League One	14	0	0	0	0	0	3	0	17	0
Stockport County	2026-27	League One	12	0	0	0	1	0	0	0	13	0
Stockport County	Total		58	2	1	0	1	0	6	0	66	2
Career total			109	3	5	0	4	0	14	1	132	4

== Honours ==
Stockport County

- EFL Trophy runner-up: 2025–26

Individual

- EFL League One Team of the Season: 2024–25
