= Louis Lomas =

English professional footballer

Louis James Lomas
Personal information
- Full name: Louis James Lomas
- Date of birth: 11 October 2000 (age 26)
- Place of birth: England
- Position: Defender

Team information
- Current team: Billericay Town

Youth career
- –2021: Norwich City
- 2020–2020: → Tampa Bay Rowdies (loan)
- 2020–2021: → Slough Town (loan)

Senior career*
Years	Team	Apps	(Gls)
2021–2022	Brackley Town	40	(0)
2022–2024	Southend United	21	(0)
2024–2025	Braintree Town	0	(0)
2024	→ Slough Town	5	(0)
2024	→ Hornchurch	1	(0)
2025–2026	Farnborough	21	(0)
2026	Hemel Hempstead Town	21	(0)
2026-	Billericay Town	0	(0)
- * Club domestic league appearances and goals as of 9:13, 27 July 2026 (UTC)

Louis James Lomas (born 11 October 2000) is an English professional footballer who plays as a defender for National League South side Billericay Town

== Youth career ==
=== Norwich Youth ===
Lomas played for Norwich City Youth teams up until July 2021.

=== Tampa Bay Rowdies (loan) ===
Lomas joined Tampa Bay Rowdies on loan from Norwich Youth from January to August 2020.

=== Slough Town (loan) ===
Lomas joined Slough Town on loan from September 2020 to February 2021.

== Senior career ==
=== Brackley Town ===
Lomas joined Brackley Town on a free transfer in July 2021.

=== Southend United ===
Louis joined Kevin Maher's Southend United in July 2022 on a free transfer. Lomas made his debut on 13 August 2022 against Solihull Moors and made 21 league appearances in his first season.

In February 2024, Lomas departed Southend United having had his contract terminated by mutual consent.

=== Braintree Town ===
On 27 June 2024, Lomas joined newly promoted National League side Braintree Town.

In August 2024, he returned to National League South side Slough Town on a one-month loan.

=== Farnborough ===
On 19 July 2025, Lomas joined National League South side Farnborough. on a Free Transfer. He made 21 appearances for the club.

On January 19 2026, he left the club

=== Hemel Hemstead Town ===
On 23 January 2026, Hemel Hempstead Town announced the signing of Lomas. During his time he made 21 appearances, including a play off quarter final against Weston Super Mare.

=== Billericay Town ===
On 7th June 2026, Louis Lomas joined newly promoted National League South side Billericay Town
