= Slavi Spasov =

Bulgarian footballer (born 2001)

- Spasov playing for Yeovil Town in 2026

Personal information
- Full name: Slavi Vasilev Spasov
- Date of birth: 31 December 2001 (age 24)
- Place of birth: Blagoevgrad, Bulgaria
- Position: Striker

Team information
- Current team: Yeovil Town
- Number: 19

Youth career
- –2018: Oxford United

Senior career*
Years	Team	Apps	(Gls)
2018–2023	Oxford United	4	(0)
2020–2021	→ Woking (loan)	19	(3)
2022	→ North Leigh (loan)	5	(1)
2022	→ Banbury United (loan)	7	(1)
2023	→ Banbury United (loan)	5	(1)
2023	Hungerford Town	8	(0)
2023–2025	Slough Town	62	(21)
2025–2026	Southend United	27	(7)
2026–	Yeovil Town	18	(3)
- * Club domestic league appearances and goals as of 22:44, 21 November 2026 (UTC)

Slavi Vasilev Spasov (Bulgarian: Слави Спасов; born 31 December 2001) is a Bulgarian professional footballer who plays as a striker for Yeovil Town.

== Club career ==
On 4 September 2018, Spasov made his senior debut for Oxford United in an EFL Trophy match against Fulham U21s, coming on as a substitute and scoring a penalty to become the club's youngest ever scorer at the age of 16 years and 226 days. Three months later, he made his league debut, playing the final 23 minutes in a 2–0 loss to Bristol Rovers.

On 2 October 2020 he went on a short-term loan to National League side Woking. On 13 January 2021, the loan was extended for a further month.

On 18 March 2022, Spasov joined Southern League Division One Central side North Leigh on a youth loan until the end of the 2021–22 season.

In October 2022, he was loaned to Banbury United for a month. He returned to his parent club following injury, but was again loaned to Banbury in February 2023.

Spasov's contract with Oxford was not renewed at the end of the 2022–23 season.

In July 2023, he joined Southern League side Hungerford Town.

On 15 December 2023, Spasov joined National League South side, Slough Town.

In June 2025, Spasov joined National League side Southend United on a two-year deal.

On 9 July 2026, Spasov signed for fellow National League side Yeovil Town for an undisclosed fee, agreeing a two-year contract.

== International career ==
In February 2019, Spasov was called up to train with the Bulgaria under-18 team but missed out through injury.

== Personal life ==
Spasov was born in Bulgaria and moved to England at the age of 12.

== Career statistics ==
As of match played 21 November 2026

Appearances and goals by club, season and competition
Club	Season	League			FA Cup		EFL Cup		Other		Total	
Club	Season	Division	Apps	Goals	Apps	Goals	Apps	Goals	Apps	Goals	Apps	Goals
Oxford United	2018–19	League One	1	0	0	0	0	0	1 (Note: Appearance(s) in EFL Trophy)	1	2	1
Oxford United	2019–20	League One	0	0	0	0	0	0	0	0	0	0
Oxford United	2020–21	League One	0	0	0	0	0	0	0	0	0	0
Oxford United	2021–22	League One	0	0	0	0	0	0	0	0	0	0
Oxford United	2022–23	League One	3	0	0	0	2	0	1	0	6	0
Oxford United	Total		4	0	0	0	2	0	2	1	8	1
Woking (loan)	2020–21	National League	19	3	2	0	—		2 (Note: Appearance(s) in FA Trophy)	1	23	4
North Leigh (loan)	2021–22	Southern League Division One Central	5	1	—		—		—		5	1
Banbury United (loan)	2022–23	National League North	12	2	1	1	—		1	2	14	5
Hungerford Town	2023–24	Southern League Premier Division South	8	0	3	0	—		3 (Note: Three appearances in FA Trophy, one appearance in Berks & Bucks Senior Cup)	0	15	0
Slough Town	2023–24	National League South	22	6	—		—		—		22	6
Slough Town	2024–25	National League South	40	15	2	2	—		3	1	45	18
Slough Town	Total		62	21	2	2	—		3	1	67	24
Southend United	2025–26	National League	27	7	2	2	—		3	0	32	9
Yeovil Town	2026–27	National League	18	3	3	3	—		1 (Note: Appearance in Somerset Premier Cup)	1	22	7
Career total			155	37	13	8	2	0	15	6	185	51
