= Dan Mooney =

Welsh footballer (born 1999)

Personal information
- Full name: Daniel John Mooney
- Date of birth: 3 July 1999 (age 27)
- Place of birth: Trafford, England
- Height: 1.81 m (5 ft 11 in)
- Position: Midfielder

Team information
- Current team: Kidderminster Harriers

Youth career
- –2017: Fleetwood Town

Senior career*
Years	Team	Apps	(Gls)
2017–2020	Fleetwood Town	2	(0)
2017	→ Bamber Bridge (loan)		
2017–2018	→ Chorley (loan)	3	(0)
2018	→ Ashton United (loan)		
2018–2019	→ Chester (loan)	35	(6)
2020–2022	Altrincham	62	(16)
2022–2023	Southend United	47	(3)
2023–2024	Altrincham	15	(1)
2024–2025	Boston United	13	(0)
2025	Chester	17	(3)
2025–	Kidderminster Harriers	0	(0)

International career^{‡}
2017	Wales U19	5	(0)
2019	Wales U21	4	(0)
- * Club domestic league appearances and goals as of 22:09, 29 May 2025 (UTC) ‡ National team caps and goals as of 13:32, 19 June 2020 (UTC)

Daniel John Mooney (born 3 July 1999) is a professional footballer who plays as a midfielder for National League club Kidderminster Harriers. He is a former Wales under-21 international.

== Early life ==
Daniel was educated at Wellacre Academy in Flixton, Greater Manchester.

== Club career ==
Mooney is a product of the Fleetwood Town Academy. At the beginning of the 2017–18 season he was sent out on loan to Northern Premier League Division One North side Bamber Bridge, where he was in excellent form as the side made a fine start to the season. He left the club in December 2017, subsequently signing a one-month youth loan for National League North side Chorley, having impressed manager, Matt Jansen, when playing against the Magpies for Bamber Bridge in the Lancashire FA Challenge Trophy quarter-final. In February 2018, he signed for Northern Premier League Premier Division side Ashton United on loan. On 9 October 2018 Mooney made his debut for Fleetwood in the starting line up for a 2–0 defeat against Rochdale in the EFL Trophy. In May 2019 Mooney signed a one-year contract extension with Fleetwood.

On 4 January 2020, it was announced Mooney had joined National League North side Altrincham for an undisclosed fee. He made his debut the same day, starting in a 5–2 win against Telford.

Mooney joined Southend United on 26 May 2022. "Dan has obvious qualities," said Blues Head Coach Kevin Maher. He left the club in December 2023 after his contract was cancelled by mutual consent, and rejoined former club Altrincham. He departed Altrincham at the end of the 2023–24 season.

In June 2024, Mooney joined newly promoted National League club Boston United. He departed the club in January 2025.

On 21 January 2025, Mooney returned to National League North side Chester on a deal until the end of the season. In June 2025, he joined Kidderminster Harriers.

== International career ==
Mooney has played for Wales at under-19 and under-21 levels.

== Career statistics ==
As of 17 January 2025

Appearances and goals by club, season and competition
Club	Season	League			FA Cup		EFL Cup		Other		Total	
Club	Season	Division	Apps	Goals	Apps	Goals	Apps	Goals	Apps	Goals	Apps	Goals
Fleetwood Town	2017–18	League One	0	0	0	0	0	0	0	0	0	0
Fleetwood Town	2018–19	League One	1	0	—		0	0	1 (Note: Appearance(s) in the EFL Trophy)	0	2	0
Fleetwood Town	2019–20	League One	1	0	0	0	0	0	1	0	2	0
Fleetwood Town	Total		2	0	0	0	0	0	2	0	4	0
Chorley (loan)	2017–18	National League North	3	0	—		—		—		3	0
Chester (loan)	2018–19	National League North	35	6	1	2	—		2 (Note: Appearance(s) in the FA Trophy)	0	38	8
Altrincham	2019–20	National League North	6	1	—		—		3 (Note: Appearances in the National League North play-offs)	1	9	2
Altrincham	2020–21	National League	20	3	1	0	—		0	0	21	3
Altrincham	2021–22	National League	36	12	2	1	—		0	0	38	13
Altrincham	Total		62	16	3	1	—		3	1	68	18
Southend United	2022–23	National League	31	2	0	0	—		0	0	31	2
Southend United	2023–24	National League	16	1	1	0	—		1	0	18	1
Southend United	Total		47	3	1	0	—		1	0	49	3
Altrincham	2023–24	National League	15	1	0	0	—		0	0	15	1
Boston United	2024–25	National League	13	0	2	0	—		2 (Note: Appearance(s) in National League Cup)	0	17	0
Career total			177	26	7	3	0	0	10	1	194	30

== Honours ==
Ashton United

- Northern Premier League Premier Division play-offs: 2017–18
