= Connor McAvoy =

Scottish footballer (born 2002)

- McAvoy with Wealdstone in 2026.

Personal information
- Full name: Connor McAvoy
- Date of birth: 16 February 2002 (age 24)
- Place of birth: Chertsey, England
- Height: 1.86 m (6 ft 1 in)
- Position: Defender

Team information
- Current team: Wealdstone
- Number: 22

Youth career
- 2006–2010: Staines Town
- 2010–2019: Fulham

Senior career*
Years	Team	Apps	(Gls)
2019–2025	Fulham	0	(0)
2021–2022	→ Wealdstone (loan)	28	(2)
2023	→ Partick Thistle (loan)	5	(0)
2024–2025	→ Ayr United (loan)	0	(0)
2025	→ Wealdstone (loan)	16	(0)
2025–	Wealdstone	46	(5)

International career
2018–2019	Scotland U17	6	(0)
2019	Scotland U18	3	(0)
2019–2020	Scotland U19	1	(0)
2022–2024	Scotland U21	5	(0)
- * Club domestic league appearances and goals as of 21:15, 11 November 2026 (UTC)

Connor McAvoy (born 16 February 2002) is a Scottish professional footballer who plays as a defender for National League club Wealdstone.

== Career ==
=== Fulham ===
Born in Chertsey, McAvoy began his career in the youth setup at Staines Town; whom he represented from the age of 4 until 8, before he joined Fulham in summer of 2010. In July 2018, he signed a two-year scholarship contract at Craven Cottage, and after impressing in the youth setup, he signed his first professional contract in July 2019, barely a year after penning his scholarship deal.

On 1 October 2019, McAvoy played the full 90 minutes in the EFL Trophy Group Stage for the U21s during a 1-0 away defeat Milton Keynes Dons. That would be his only appearance during that year's EFL Trophy campaign; his next three appearance would come in the following campaign, as he played against Cambridge United, Peterborough United and Burton Albion respectively.

In October 2021, McAvoy was loaned out to National League side Wealdstone for a month, after impressing during the first month of the deal; the loan was extended until January 2022, then until the end of the campaign on 10 January 2022.

On 31 January 2023, McAvoy joined Scottish Championship side Partick Thistle on loan until the end of the season, but after making six appearances for The Jags, he ruptured his medial ligament against Greenock Morton on 11 March and returned to parent club, Fulham five days later.

On 14 September 2023, whilst still recovering from injury, McAvoy signed a new deal with The Cottagers until at least the summer of 2025, with an option of a further year. He returned from the injury in December 2023, but this was after McAvoy had suffered numerous set backs in his recovery; which included three surgeries after the screws came loose in his knee.

On 30 August 2024, McAvoy returned to Scotland as he was loaned to Championship side, Ayr United until the end of the season. Having failed to make an appearance, he was recalled in January 2025, subsequently returning to National League side Wealdstone on loan for the remainder of the season. In June 2025, it was announced that McAvoy would be leaving Fulham upon the expiry of his contract.

=== Wealdstone ===
On 1 August 2025, McAvoy returned to National League side Wealdstone on a permanent deal following two loan spells. After suffering an injury in pre-season, McAvoy made his third debut for the club on 1 October, in a 2–0 win away at Brackley Town. He scored his first goal as a Wealdstone player three days later, in a 1–1 draw against Altrincham. He started the 2026 FA Trophy final, going on to convert his spot kick in an eventual 4–2 penalty shoot-out defeat against Southend United.

== International career ==
McAvoy qualifies for Scotland through his father, Gordon; who was born in Paisley. He has represented the country at under-17, under-18, under-19 and under-21 levels.

== Career statistics ==
As of match played 7 November 2026

Appearances and goals by club, season and competition
Club	Season	League			National cup (Note: Includes FA Cup, Scottish Cup)		League cup (Note: Includes EFL Cup, Scottish League Cup)		Other		Total	
Club	Season	Division	Apps	Goals	Apps	Goals	Apps	Goals	Apps	Goals	Apps	Goals
Fulham	2019–20	Championship	0	0	0	0	0	0	1 (Note: Appearance(s) in EFL Trophy for Fulham U21)	0	1	0
Fulham	2020–21	Premier League	0	0	0	0	0	0	3	0	3	0
Fulham	2021–22	Championship	0	0	0	0	0	0	0	0	0	0
Fulham	2022–23	Premier League	0	0	0	0	0	0	0	0	0	0
Fulham	2023–24	Premier League	0	0	0	0	0	0	0	0	0	0
Fulham	2024–25	Premier League	0	0	0	0	0	0	0	0	0	0
Total			0	0	0	0	0	0	4	0	4	0
Wealdstone (loan)	2021–22	National League	28	2	0	0	0	0	1 (Note: Appearances in FA Trophy)	0	29	2
Partick Thistle (loan)	2022–23	Scottish Championship	5	0	1	0	—		—		6	0
Ayr United (loan)	2024–25	Scottish Championship	0	0	0	0	—		0 (Note: Appearances in the Scottish Challenge Cup)	0	0	0
Wealdstone (loan)	2024–25	National League	16	0	0	0	—		1 (Note: Appearances in the National League Cup)	0	17	0
Wealdstone	2025–26	National League	31	4	3	0	—		7 (Note: Includes FA Trophy, National League Cup)	1	41	5
Wealdstone	2026–27	National League	15	1	2	0	—		1	0	18	1
Total			46	5	5	0	0	0	8	1	59	6
Career total			93	7	5	0	0	0	14	1	115	8

== Honours ==
Wealdstone

- FA Trophy runner-up: 2025–26
