= Micah Obiero =

Kenyan footballer (born 2001)

- Micah Obiero in 2026

Personal information
- Full name: Micah Obonyo Dulo Obiero
- Date of birth: 22 February 2001 (age 25)
- Place of birth: Redbridge, England
- Height: 5 ft 10 in (1.77 m)
- Position: Striker

Team information
- Current team: Carlisle United
- Number: 19

Youth career
- Leyton Orient
- XYZ Academy
- 2016–2022: Huddersfield Town

Senior career*
| Years | Team | Apps | (Gls) |
| 2020–2022 | Huddersfield Town | 1 | (0) |
| 2020 | → Carlisle United (loan) | 4 | (0) |
| 2021 | → FC Halifax Town (loan) | 1 | (0) |
| 2022 | Boston United | 7 | (0) |
| 2022–2026 | Wealdstone | 152 | (29) |
| 2026– | Carlisle United | 8 | (3) |

International career^{‡}
| 2026– | Kenya | 2 | (0) |
- * Club domestic league appearances and goals as of 12:04, 10 September 2026 (UTC) ‡ National team caps and goals as of 23:45, 7 June 2026 (UTC)

Micah Obonyo Dulo Obiero (born 22 February 2001) is a professional footballer who plays as a striker for National League club Carlisle United. Born in England, he plays for the Kenya national team.

== Early life ==
Obiero was born in Redbridge, London. Obiero is the son of the Kenyan former footballer Henry Obiero. His brother, Zech, is also a professional footballer.

== Club career ==
Obiero began his career in the Leyton Orient academy, before having a spell at the XYZ Academy in Hackney, London. He arrived on trial at Huddersfield Town during the 2016–17 season, before signing a professional contract with the club in April 2018. He signed a new contract with the club in January 2020, taking him through to June 2022.

Obiero made his senior debut for Huddersfield on 22 July 2020, the last day of the 2019–20 season, coming on at half-time in a 4–1 Championship defeat to Millwall.

On 16 October 2020, he joined League Two side Carlisle United on loan until January 2021. He made four league appearances for the club and scored his first professional goal against Aston Villa under-23s in the EFL Trophy, before returning to Huddersfield as planned in January 2021.

On 29 March 2021, Obiero joined National League side FC Halifax Town on loan for the remainder of the 2020–21 season.

On 17 July 2022, Obiero joined National League North club Boston United.

On 8 October 2022, Obiero signed for National League club Wealdstone. He made his debut on the same day, appearing as a substitute in a 2–1 defeat to Boreham Wood. Obiero's first goal for the club came on 26 October, a consolation in a 6–1 defeat to Notts County. Having ended the 2022–23 season as the club's top scorer with 8 league goals, Obiero signed a two-year contract extension in August 2023. He signed a further one-year contract in July 2025.

On 28 March 2026, Obiero scored a stoppage-time winner in the semi-final of the FA Trophy against Marine. Three days later, he scored his first career hat-trick, netting three times in the first 25 minutes in a 7–0 victory over Hartlepool United. He played the full 90 minutes of the 2026 FA Trophy final against Southend United and scored his penalty in the ensuing shoot-out, although Wealdstone were ultimately defeated 4–2.

On 9 September 2026, Obiero rejoined Carlisle United for an undisclosed fee.

== International career ==
Obiero made his Kenya debut on 4 June 2026, appearing as a substitute in a 1–1 draw in a friendly against Lesotho in Pretoria.

== Career statistics ==
=== Club ===
As of match played 5 September 2026

Appearances and goals by club, season and competition
| Club | Season | League | | | National Cup | | League Cup | | Other | | Total | |
| Club | Season | Division | Apps | Goals | Apps | Goals | Apps | Goals | Apps | Goals | Apps | Goals |
|---|---|---|---|---|---|---|---|---|---|---|---|---|
| Huddersfield Town | 2019–20 | Championship | 1 | 0 | 0 | 0 | 0 | 0 | 0 | 0 | 1 | 0 |
| Huddersfield Town | 2020–21 | Championship | 0 | 0 | 0 | 0 | 0 | 0 | 0 | 0 | 0 | 0 |
| Huddersfield Town | 2021–22 | Championship | 0 | 0 | 0 | 0 | 0 | 0 | 0 | 0 | 0 | 0 |
| Huddersfield Town | Total | | 1 | 0 | 0 | 0 | 0 | 0 | 0 | 0 | 1 | 0 |
| Carlisle United (loan) | 2020–21 | League Two | 4 | 0 | 1 | 0 | 0 | 0 | 1 (Note: Appearance in the EFL Trophy) | 1 | 6 | 1 |
| FC Halifax Town (loan) | 2020–21 | National League | 1 | 0 | 0 | 0 | — | | 0 | 0 | 1 | 0 |
| Boston United | 2022–23 | National League North | 7 | 0 | 2 | 0 | — | | 0 | 0 | 9 | 0 |
| Wealdstone | 2022–23 | National League | 32 | 8 | 0 | 0 | — | | 1 (Note: Appearance(s) in FA Trophy) | 0 | 33 | 8 |
| Wealdstone | 2023–24 | National League | 34 | 1 | 1 | 0 | — | | 2 | 1 | 37 | 2 |
| Wealdstone | 2024–25 | National League | 35 | 3 | 3 | 0 | — | | 5 (Note: Includes FA Trophy and National League Cup) | 0 | 43 | 3 |
| Wealdstone | 2025–26 | National League | 45 | 14 | 3 | 2 | — | | 10 | 3 | 58 | 19 |
| Wealdstone | 2026–27 | National League | 6 | 3 | 0 | 0 | — | | 0 | 0 | 6 | 3 |
| Wealdstone | Total | | 152 | 29 | 7 | 2 | 0 | 0 | 18 | 4 | 177 | 35 |
| Carlisle United | 2026–27 | National League | 0 | 0 | 0 | 0 | — | | 0 | 0 | 0 | 0 |
| Career total | | | 165 | 29 | 10 | 2 | 0 | 0 | 19 | 5 | 194 | 36 |

=== International ===
As of match played 7 June 2026

Appearances and goals by national team and year
| National team | Year | Apps | Goals |
|---|---|---|---|
| Kenya | 2026 | 2 | 0 |
| Total | | 2 | 0 |

== Honours ==
Wealdstone

- FA Trophy runner-up: 2025–26
