= Cav Miley =

Jèrriais footballer (born 1995)

Personal information
- Date of birth: 29 April 1995 (age 31)
- Place of birth: Birmingham, England
- Height: 1.78 m (5 ft 10 in)
- Position: Defensive midfielder

Team information
- Current team: Chelmsford City
- Number: 17

Senior career*
Years	Team	Apps	(Gls)
–2017	St. Paul's		
2017–2022	Eastleigh	178	(7)
2022–2026	Southend United	157	(2)
2026–	Chelmsford City	15	(0)

International career
2015–2017	Jersey	5	(1)
2018	England C	1	(0)
- * Club domestic league appearances and goals as of 14:02, 22 November 2026 (UTC)

Cavaghn Miley (born 29 April 1995) is a Jèrriais footballer who plays as a defensive midfielder for National League South side Chelmsford City.

== Career ==
Miley started his career with Jersey side St. Paul's, helping them win the Jersey Football Combination Premiership.

In 2017, he signed for Eastleigh in the English fifth tier.

In 2022, Miley signed for another National League club, Southend United, and in 2023 was voted player of the year by the club's supporters and won goal of the season for his first goal for the club, an added time winner scored at Torquay United on 25 February 2023.

On 5 June 2026, Miley signed for National League South side Chelmsford City.

== Career statistics ==
As of match played 24 January 2026

Appearances and goals by club, season and competition
Club	Season	League			FA Cup		League Cup		Other		Total	
Club	Season	Division	Apps	Goals	Apps	Goals	Apps	Goals	Apps	Goals	Apps	Goals
Eastleigh	2017–18	National League	37	2	0	0	0	0	0	0	37	2
Eastleigh	2018–19	National League	42	1	0	0	0	0	1 (Note: Appearance in Football Conference play-offs)	0	43	1
Eastleigh	2019–20	National League	35	1	6	0	0	0	1 (Note: Appearance(s) in FA Trophy)	1	42	2
Eastleigh	2020–21	National League	36	3	1	0	0	0	0	0	37	3
Eastleigh	Total		177	7	7	0	0	0	2	1	186	8
Southend United	2021–22	National League	27	0	1	0	0	0	0	0	28	0
Southend United	2022–23	National League	46	1	1	0	0	0	3	0	50	1
Southend United	2023–24	National League	36	1	0	0	—		0	0	36	1
Southend United	2024–25	National League	25	0	1	0	—		4 (Note: 1 appearance and 1 goal in FA Trophy, 3 appearances in National League play-offs)	1	30	1
Southend United	2025–26	National League	23	0	1	0	—		0	0	24	0
Southend United	Total		157	2	4	0	0	0	7	1	168	3
Career total			334	9	11	0	0	0	9	2	354	11

== Honours ==
Southend United

- FA Trophy: 2025–26

Individual

- Southend United Player of the Year: 2022–23
