= Callum Powell =

English footballer (born 1996)

Personal information
- Full name: Callum Powell
- Date of birth: 28 January 1996 (age 30)
- Place of birth: Coventry, England
- Height: 1.66 m (5 ft 5 in)
- Position: Forward

Team information
- Current team: Kettering Town

Youth career
- –2014: Northampton Town

Senior career*
Years	Team	Apps	(Gls)
2014–2015	Simon Fraser Athletics		
2015–2016	Rugby Town		
2016–2017	Wrexham	24	(2)
2017	→ Tamworth (loan)		
2017–2018	Tamworth		
2018–2019	Stourbridge		
2019–2020	Nuneaton Borough		
2020	Buxton		
2020	Stratford Town		
2020–2022	Kettering Town	28	(17)
2022–2024	Southend United	67	(12)
2024	Braintree Town	16	(1)
2024	→ Tamworth (loan)	2	(0)
2024–	Kettering Town	0	(0)
- * Club domestic league appearances and goals as of 17:32, 24 December 2024 (UTC)

Callum Powell (born 28 January 1996) is an English professional footballer who plays as a forward for Southern League Premier Division Central club Kettering Town.

== Youth career ==
=== Northampton Town ===
Powell played for Northampton Town Youth team up until July 2014.

== Senior career ==
=== Simon Fraser ===
Powell moved to Canada and joined Simon Fraser Athletics Soccer team in 2014.

=== Rugby Town ===
Powell Returned to England and joined Rugby Town F.C. in 2015.

=== Wrexham ===
Powell Moved to Wales and joined Wrexham AFC in 2016.

=== Tamworth ===
Callum joined Tamworth F.C. on loan from March until May 2017, he later chose to move to the club on a permanent basis in July 2017 on a free transfer.

=== Stourbridge ===
Powell joined Stourbridge in 2018.

=== Nuneaton ===
On a free transfer, Callum joined Nuneaton Borough F.C. in 2019.

=== Buxton ===
Powell later had a short spell at Buxton F.C. from July to October 2020.

=== Stratford Town ===
Powell had another short spell at Stratford Town F.C. from October to November 2020.

=== Kettering ===
Powell played for Kettering Town from November 2020 until January 2022. When he left Kettering, he topped the team's scoring charts with 14 goals in all competitions and seven assists.

=== Southend ===
Powell Joined Southend United in January 2022 for an undisclosed fee. He played his first game on 29 January 2022 against Dover Athletic F.C. Powell scored 10 league goals in 60 appearances.

=== Braintree Town ===
Powell joined Braintree Town in the summer of 2024 after he left Southend. Powell currently wears the number 10 shirt and has 1 goal to his name and 4 assists

=== Kettering Town ===
In December 2024, Powell returned to Southern Football League Premier Division Central side Kettering Town.
