= Charley Kendall =

English footballer (born 2000)

Personal information
- Full name: Charley George Kendall
- Date of birth: 15 December 2000 (age 25)
- Place of birth: Eastbourne, England
- Height: 1.81 m (5 ft 11 in)
- Position: Striker

Team information
- Current team: Worthing
- Number: 24

Youth career
- 2016–2020: Queens Park Rangers

Senior career*
Years	Team	Apps	(Gls)
2020–2021	Queens Park Rangers	0	(0)
2020–2021	→ Eastbourne Borough (loan)	15	(5)
2021–2022	Eastbourne Borough	16	(11)
2022–2024	Lincoln City	3	(0)
2022	→ Eastbourne Borough (loan)	19	(13)
2022–2023	→ Sutton United (loan)	7	(0)
2023	→ Bromley (loan)	10	(1)
2023–2024	→ Dagenham & Redbridge (loan)	24	(3)
2024	Woking	35	(7)
2024–2026	Southend United	55	(13)
2026–	Worthing	2	(0)
- * Club domestic league appearances and goals as of 21:49, 17 September 2026 (UTC)

Charley George Kendall (born 15 December 2000) is an English professional footballer who plays as a striker for National League club Worthing.

== Career ==
Born in Eastbourne, Kendall began his career with Queens Park Rangers, spending five years with the club. He spent time during the 2020–21 season on loan at Eastbourne Borough, before signing permanently in September 2021, having left QPR by mutual consent in August. He moved to Lincoln City in January 2022, returning immediately on loan to Eastbourne until the end of the 2021–22 season.

He scored on his Lincoln debut, in an EFL Cup game on 9 August 2022.

On 30 August 2022, he joined Sutton United on a season-long loan. He was recalled from his loan on 4 January 2023 having played 10 times for Sutton United in all competitions. He joined Bromley on loan for the rest of the season on 26 January 2023.

On 28 July 2023, he joined Dagenham & Redbridge on a season-long loan.

On 18 January 2024, Kendall joined Woking on a permanent deal.

On 13 December 2024, Kendall joined fellow National League side Southend United on an 18-month deal.

On 7 September 2026, Kendall joined newly-promoted National League side Worthing for an undisclosed fee.

== Career statistics ==
As of match played 15 September 2026

Appearances and goals by club, season and competition
Club	Season	League			FA Cup		League Cup		Other		Total	
Club	Season	Division	Apps	Goals	Apps	Goals	Apps	Goals	Apps	Goals	Apps	Goals
Queens Park Rangers	2020–21	Championship	0	0	0	0	0	0	—		0	0
Eastbourne Borough (loan)	2020–21	National League South	15	5	4	0	—		0	0	19	5
Eastbourne Borough	2021–22	National League South	16	11	0	0	0	0	2 (Note: Appearance(s) in FA Trophy)	0	18	11
Lincoln City	2021–22	League One	0	0	0	0	0	0	—		0	0
Lincoln City	2022–23	League One	3	0	0	0	2	1	—		5	1
Lincoln City	Total		3	0	0	0	2	1	0	0	5	1
Eastbourne Borough (loan)	2021–22	National League South	19	13	0	0	0	0	1 (Note: Appearance in National League South play-offs)	0	20	13
Sutton United (loan)	2022–23	League Two	7	0	1	0	0	0	2 (Note: Appearance(s) in EFL Trophy)	0	10	0
Bromley (loan)	2022–23	National League	11	1	—		—		—		11	1
Dagenham & Redbridge (loan)	2023–24	National League	24	3	1	0	—		1	0	26	3
Woking	2023–24	National League	18	4	—		—		—		18	4
Woking	2024–25	National League	17	3	2	0	—		0	0	19	3
Woking	Total		35	7	2	0	0	0	0	0	37	7
Southend United	2024–25	National League	22	4	—		—		5 (Note: Two appearances in FA Trophy, three appearances and one goal in National League play-offs)	1	27	5
Southend United	2025–26	National League	28	8	0	0	—		7 (Note: Six appearances and two goals in FA Trophy, one appearance in National League play-offs)	2	35	10
Southend United	2026–27	National League	5	1	0	0	—		0	0	5	1
Southend United	Total		55	13	0	0	0	0	12	3	67	16
Worthing	2026–27	National League	2	0	0	0	—		1 (Note: Appearance(s) in National League Cup)	0	3	0
Career total			187	53	8	0	2	1	19	3	216	57

== Honours ==
Southend United

- FA Trophy: 2025–26
