= Oli Coker =

English footballer

Personal information
- Full name: Oliver Coker
- Date of birth: 9 March 2003 (age 23)
- Place of birth: Southend-on-Sea, England
- Height: 1.81 m (5 ft 11 1/2 in)
- Position: Central midfielder

Team information
- Current team: Southend United
- Number: 28

Youth career
- 2011–2020: Southend United

Senior career*
Years	Team	Apps	(Gls)
2020–	Southend United	119	(18)
2022	→ East Thurrock United (loan)	10	(2)
2023	→ Aveley (loan)	20	(4)
- * Club domestic league appearances and goals as of 24 September 2026 (UTC)

Oliver Coker (born 9 March 2003) is an English footballer who plays as a central midfielder for National League club Southend United.

== Early life and education ==
Coker grew up supporting Southend United and attended Greensward Academy in Hockley.

== Career ==
He made his senior debut for Southend United on 6 October 2020 in a 3–0 home defeat to Portsmouth in the EFL Trophy. He made his league debut for the club as a late substitute in the final match of the season as the club drew 1–1 with Newport County. Across the 2020–21 season, he made three appearances in all competitions as Southend finished 23rd in League Two and were relegated to the National League. In July 2022, Coker signed a new two-year contract with the club holding the option for a further year.

== Career statistics ==
As of match played 7 February 2026

Appearances and goals by club, season and competition
Club	Season	League			FA Cup		League Cup		Other		Total	
Club	Season	Division	Apps	Goals	Apps	Goals	Apps	Goals	Apps	Goals	Apps	Goals
Southend United	2020–21	League Two	1	0	0	0	0	0	2 (Note: Appearances in EFL Trophy)	0	3	0
Southend United	2022–23	National League	3	0	0	0	0	0	0	0	3	0
Southend United	2023–24	National League	32	6	1	0	0	0	1 (Note: Appearances in FA Trophy)	0	34	6
Southend United	2024–25	National League	32	5	2	1	0	0	3 (Note: Appearance(s) in National League play-offs)	0	37	6
Southend United	2025–26	National League	23	2	1	0	–		0	0	24	2
Career total			91	13	4	1	0	0	6	0	101	14

== Honours ==
Southend United

- FA Trophy: 2025–26
