= 2026–27 Rochdale A.F.C. season =

English football club season

Rochdale
2026–27 season
- Chairman: Simon Gauge; Cameron Ogden
- Head coach: Ian Watson
- Stadium: Spotland Stadium

The 2026–27 season is Rochdale's 120th in existence and their first season back being in League Two since the 2022–23 season following promotion from the National League in the preceding season. The club would also participate in the FA Cup, the EFL Cup and the EFL Trophy.

== Managerial changes ==
Prior to the season starting, Jimmy McNulty left as head coach to join League One side Stockport County. He was shortly replaced by Ian Watson from South Shields.

== Transfers ==
=== In ===
Date	Pos.	Player	From	Fee	Ref.
2 July 2026	RW	(Republic of Ireland) Cian Hayes	(England) Peterborough United	Undisclosed	
8 July 2026	CM	(England) Will Jenkins	(England) South Shields	Undisclosed	
9 July 2026	CB	(England) Laurence Maguire	(England) Milton Keynes Dons	Free	
24 July 2026	GK	(England) Sam Waller	(England) Harrogate Town	Free	
26 July 2026	ST	(Republic of Ireland) Mickey Page	(England) Everton F.C.	Free	
27 July 2026	CB	(England) Sam Sherring	(England) Milton Keynes Dons	Free	
28 July 2026	LW	(England) Zain Silcott-Duberry	(England) Sheffield Wednesday	Free	
28 July 2026	GK	(England) Jake Spaven	(England) Wigan Athletic	Free	
4 August 2026	RW	(England) Jonny Smith	(England) Wigan Athletic	Undisclosed	
14 August 2026	CM	(Republic of Ireland) Baba Adeeko	(England) Wigan Athletic	Undisclosed	
1 September 2026	LW	(Scotland) Glenn Middleton	(England) Doncaster Rovers	Undisclosed	
11 September 2026	CB	(England) Aden Flint	(England) Walsall	Free	
23 October 2026	CAM	(England) Jamie Paterson	(England) Plymouth Argyle	Free	
13 November 2026	CM	(England) Jamie Allen	(England) Coventry City	Free	

=== Loaned in ===
Date	Pos.	Player	Loaned from	Loaned until	Ref.
17 July 2026	GK	(Sweden) Nils Ramming	(England) Brighton & Hove Albion	End of Season	
17 July 2026	CB	(England) Kaiden Wilson	(England) Chelsea	End of Season	
6 August 2026	CF	(Jamaica) Dajaune Brown	(England) Derby County	End of Season	
21 August 2026	CM	(England) Kane Taylor	(England) Aston Villa	End of Season	
1 September 2026	RB	(England) Charlie Tasker	(England) Brighton & Hove Albion	End of Season	

=== Loaned out ===
Date	Pos.	Player	Loaned to	Date until	Ref.

=== Out ===
Date	Pos.	Player	To	Fee	Ref.
30 June 2026	CM	(United States) Liam Humbles	(England) Altrincham	Undisclosed	

=== Released / out of contract ===
Date	Pos.	Player	Subsequent club	Joined date	Ref.
30 June 2026	LW	(Tanzania) Tarryn Allarakhia	(England) Boreham Wood	1 July 2026	
30 June 2026	CB	(England) Kyron Gordon	(England) Stockport County	1 July 2026	
30 June 2026	LB	(Democratic Republic of the Congo) David Tutonda	(England) Accrington Stanley	16 July 2026	
30 June 2026	CF	(England) Tyler Smith	(Northern Ireland) Derry City	1 August 2026	
30 June 2026	GK	(England) Tom Myles	(England) Salford City	25 August 2026	
30 June 2026	LM	(England) Aidan Barlow			
30 June 2026	CM	(England) Jake Burger			
30 June 2026	CF	(Netherlands) Manny Duku			
30 June 2026	CAM	(France) Anthony Gomez Mancini			
30 June 2026	RB	(England) Bryce Hosannah			
30 June 2026	LW	(Scotland) Connor McBride			
30 June 2026	LM	(England) Joe Pritchard			

=== New contract ===
Date	Pos.	Player	Contract expiry	Ref.
4 July 2026	CF	(England) Ian Henderson	30 June 2027	

== Pre-season and friendlies ==
On 8 June, Dale announced a pre-season friendly against FC United of Manchester. Two days later, a fixture against Farnham Town was confirmed. A training camp in Murcia, Spain between 16 and 21 July was later announced along with a TBC behind closed doors friendly. On 26 June, a second home pre-season friendly was confirmed against FC Halifax Town.

Win Draw Loss Fixtures

14 July 2026 Friendly	FC United of Manchester	2–0	Rochdale	Moston
19:45 BST	Chimalilo 42'; Donohue 68'	Report		Stadium: Broadhurst Park

19 July 2026 Friendly	Rochdale	3–3	Al-Rayyan	San Pedro del Pinatar, Spain
11:00 CEST	Ebanks-Landell 64'; Gilmour 77'; Henderson 82'	Report	Róger Guedes 12'; Gilmour 47' (o.g.); Wesley 74'	Stadium: Pinatar Arena

25 July 2026 Friendly	Rochdale	2–2	Farnham Town	Spotland
15:00 BST	Dieseruvwe 8'; Henderson 83'	Report	Bingham 38'; Bayliss 71'	Stadium: Crown Oil Arena; Attendance: 1,612

28 July 2026 Friendly	Rochdale	2–3	FC Halifax Town	Spotland
19:45 BST	Henderson 26'; Hannant 37', (red card) 50'; Ebanks-Landell (yellow card) 79'	Report	Gilsenan 5'; Trialist B 7'; Allen 47'; Trialist A (red card) 50'	Stadium: Crown Oil Arena; Attendance: 1,322 (181 away)

== Competitions ==
=== Overall record ===
Competition	First match	Last match	Starting round	Final position	Record							
Competition	First match	Last match	Starting round	Final position	Pld	W	D	L	GF	GA	GD	Win %
League Two	15 August 2026	8 May 2027	Matchday 1		9	4	1	4	10	11	−1	44.44
FA Cup	November 2026		First round		0	0	0	0	0	0	+0	—
EFL Cup	1 August 2026	1 August 2026	Preliminary round	First round	2	1	1	0	2	4	−2	50.00
EFL Trophy	22 September 2026		Group stage		1	0	1	0	3	3	+0	0.00
Total					12	5	3	4	15	18	−3	41.67

Last updated: 3 October 2026
Source: Soccerway

=== League Two ===
==== League table ====
Pos	Team	Pld	W	D	L	GF	GA	GD	Pts	Promotion, qualification or relegation
20	Oldham Athletic	16	4	4	8	17	22	−5	16	
21	Colchester United	15	3	6	6	15	21	−6	15	
22	Rochdale	16	4	3	9	19	30	−11	15	
23	Rotherham United	15	2	7	6	18	25	−7	13	Relegation to National League
24	Crawley Town	13	3	3	7	15	22	−7	12	Relegation to National League

Updated to match(es) played on 21 November 2026. Source: EFL Official Website
Rules for classification: 1) Points; 2) Goal difference; 3) Number of goals scored; 4) Head-to-head results; 5) Wins; 6) Away goals; 7) Penalty points (sec 9.5); 8) 12-point sending off offences

==== Results summary ====
Overall								Home						Away					
Pld	W	D	L	GF	GA	GD	Pts	W	D	L	GF	GA	GD	W	D	L	GF	GA	GD
16	4	3	9	19	30	−11	15	3	1	4	10	14	−4	1	2	5	9	16	−7

Last updated: 21 November 2026.
Source: Soccerway

==== Results by round ====
Round	1	2	3	4	5	6	7	8	9	10	11	12	13	14	15	16	17	18	19	20	21	22	23	24	25	26	27	28	29	30	31	32
Ground	A	H	A	H	H	A	H	A	H	A	A	H	H	A	H	A	H	A	A	H	A	H	H	A	H	A	A	H	H	A	A	H
Result	L	L	L	W	L	D	W	W	W	D	L	D	L	L	L	L																
Position	24	23	24	19	22	24	17	15	11	10	13	14	17	19	22	22																
Points	0	0	0	3	3	4	7	10	13	14	14	15	15	15	15	15																

Source: Soccerway
A = Away; H = Home; W = Win; D = Draw; L = Loss

==== Matches ====
On 25 June, the League Two fixtures were revealed.

Win Draw Loss Fixtures

15 August 2026 1	Newport County	3–0	Rochdale	Newport
12:30 BST	Cameron 18'; Gwengwe 38'; Jenkins (yellow card) 86'; Bamba 90+1'; Merritt (yellow card) 90+5'	Report	Adebayo-Rowling (yellow card) 34'; Bilongo (yellow card) 42' (yellow-red card) 66'; Hannant (yellow card) 53'	Stadium: Rodney Parade; Attendance: 4,872; Referee: Harrison Blair

22 August 2026 2	Rochdale	1–2	Crawley Town	Spotland
15:00 BST	Ebanks-Landell 54'	Report	Aderoju 8'; Watson (pen.), 72'	Stadium: Crown Oil Arena; Attendance: 3,895; Referee: Zac Kennard-Kettle

29 August 2026 3	Colchester United	1–0	Rochdale	Colchester
15:00 BST	Hunt (yellow card) 37'; Williams 87'	Report	Gilmour (yellow card) 40'; Moss (yellow card) 80'	Stadium: JobServe Community Stadium; Attendance: 4,683 (283 away); Referee: Declan Bourne

1 September 2026 4	Rochdale	3–0	Shrewsbury Town	Spotland
19:45 BST	Adeeko 33'; Hannant 43'; Adebayo-Rowling (yellow card) 74'; Smith 80'	Report	Anderson (yellow card) 27'; Boyle (yellow card) 50'; Gbodé (yellow card) 69'; Gray (yellow card) 83'	Stadium: Crown Oil Arena; Attendance: 3,241; Referee: Simon Mather

5 September 2026 5	Rochdale	1–4	Gillingham	Spotland
15:00 BST	Francis (yellow card) 51' (red card) 60'; Tasker 87'		McManus (yellow card) 9'; Brophy 33', 68'; Beckles 53'; Sillah 56'	Stadium: Crown Oil Arena; Referee: Jamie Robinson

12 September 2026 6	Walsall	0–0	Rochdale	Bescot
15:00 BST	Crew (yellow card) 29'	Report	Adeeko (yellow card) 53'; Gilmour (yellow card) 77'; Middleton (yellow card) 90+4'	Stadium: Pallet-Track Bescot Stadium; Attendance: 5,669; Referee: Jamie O'Connor

19 September 2026 7	Rochdale	2–0	Oldham Athletic	Spotland
12:30 BST	Moss 7'; Brown 63'			Stadium: Crown Oil Arena; Referee: Stephen Parkinson
Note: Fixture was initially scheduled for a 15:00 kick-off, but was brought forward for live Sky Sports broadcasting.

26 September 2026 8	Fleetwood Town	1–2	Rochdale	Fleetwood
15:00 BST	Helm 30'; Cirino (yellow card) 73'	Report	Brown 8'; Flint 14'; Adebayo-Rowling (yellow card) 39' (yellow-red card) 69'	Stadium: Highbury Stadium; Attendance: 3,726 (1,117 away); Referee: Alex Chilowicz

3 October 2026 9	Rochdale	1–0	Swindon Town	Spotland
15:00 BST	Hayes 88'	Report	Majekodunmi (yellow card) 81' (yellow-red card) 85'	Stadium: Crown Oil Arena; Attendance: 4,235 (530 away); Referee: Alan Dale

10 October 2026 10	Tranmere Rovers	1–1	Rochdale	Birkenhead
15:00 BST	Conlon 15'		Brown 57'; Adebayo-Rowling (yellow card) 90+1'	Stadium: Prenton Park; Attendance: 7,062; Referee: Sunny Singh Gill

17 October 2026 11	Crewe Alexandra	3–2	Rochdale	Crewe
15:00 BST	Holíček 39'; Gibson 45', 55'; White (yellow card) 50'	Report	Tabiner 65' (o.g.); Flint 90'	Stadium: Mornflake Stadium; Referee: Aaron Jackson

20 October 2026 12	Rochdale	2–2	Grimsby Town	Spotland
19:45 BST	Adeeko (yellow card) 20'; Brown 38'; Francis (yellow card) 49'; Hayes (yellow card) 67'; Henderson 88'	Report	Vernam (yellow card) 6'; Kacurri (yellow card) 42'; Green 57'; Walker (yellow card) 50', (goal) 72'	Stadium: Crown Oil Arena; Attendance: 3,612; Referee: Declan Bourne

24 October 2026 13	Rochdale	0–5	Accrington Stanley	Spotland
15:00 BST	Beckwith (yellow card) 87'	Report	Woods 14'; Warren 38', (yellow card) 58'; Tutonda (yellow card) 23'; Love (yellow card) 33'; Walton 45+1', 51'; Henderson (yellow card) 50', (goal) 66'	Stadium: Crown Oil Arena; Attendance: 4,029; Referee: Richie Watkins

31 October 2026 14	Port Vale	4–2	Rochdale	Burslem
12:30 GMT	Hernández 2'; Byers 11' (pen.); Gabriel 22'; Humphreys (yellow card) 48'; Byers (yellow card) 62'; Figueroa 86'	Report	Gilmour (yellow card) 15'; Middleton (yellow card) 33'; Hayes (yellow card) 38'; Henderson 82'; Tasker 90+4'	Stadium: Vale Park; Attendance: 6,458; Referee: Declan Bourne
Note: Fixture was initially scheduled for a 15:00 kick-off, but was brought forward for live Sky Sports broadcasting.

14 November 2026 15	Rochdale	0–1	York City	Spotland
15:00 GMT	Gilmour (yellow card) 67'	Report	Hunt (yellow card) 29'; Pearce 56'; Felix (yellow card) 60'; Banks (yellow card) 88'	Stadium: Crown Oil Arena; Attendance: 5,612 (1,644 away); Referee: Matthew Donohue

21 November 2026 16	Northampton Town	3–2	Rochdale	Sixfields
15:00 GMT	Dale 11'; Warhurst (yellow card) 35'; C. Evans (yellow card) 63'; List 65'; L. Evans (yellow card) 69', (goal) 74' (pen.)	Report	Allen (yellow card) 24'; Francis 51'; Hayes 53'; Ebanks-Landell (yellow card) 61'; Taylor (yellow card) 64'	Stadium: Sixfields Stadium; Attendance: 5,515 (291 away); Referee: Callum Jones

28 November 2026 17	Rochdale	v	Barnet	Spotland
15:00 GMT				Stadium: Crown Oil Arena

1 December 2026 18	Cheltenham Town	v	Rochdale	Cheltenham
19:45 GMT				Stadium: EV Charger Points Stadium

12 December 2026 19	Exeter City	v	Rochdale	Exeter
15:00 GMT				Stadium: St James Park

19 December 2026 20	Rochdale	v	Bristol Rovers	Spotland
15:00 GMT				Stadium: Crown Oil Arena

26 December 2026 21	Rotherham United	v	Rochdale	Rotherham
15:00 GMT				Stadium: AESSEAL New York Stadium

29 December 2026 22	Rochdale	v	Salford City	Spotland
19:45 GMT				Stadium: Crown Oil Arena

1 January 2027 23	Rochdale	v	Chesterfield	Spotland
15:00 GMT				Stadium: Crown Oil Arena

9 January 2027 24	Bristol Rovers	v	Rochdale	Horfield
15:00 GMT				Stadium: Memorial Stadium

16 January 2027 25	Rochdale	v	Crewe Alexandra	Spotland
15:00 GMT				Stadium: Crown Oil Arena

19 January 2027 26	Grimsby Town	v	Rochdale	Cleethorpes
19:45 GMT				Stadium: Blundell Park

23 January 2027 27	Accrington Stanley	v	Rochdale	Accrington
15:00 GMT				Stadium: Wham Stadium

30 January 2027 28	Rochdale	v	Port Vale	Spotland
15:00 GMT				Stadium: Crown Oil Arena

6 February 2027 29	Rochdale	v	Colchester United	Spotland
15:00 GMT				Stadium: Crown Oil Arena

9 February 2027 30	Shrewsbury Town	v	Rochdale	Shrewsbury
19:45 GMT				Stadium: Croud Meadow

13 February 2027 31	Gillingham	v	Rochdale	Gillingham
15:00 GMT				Stadium: MEMS Priestfield Stadium

18 February 2027 32	Rochdale	v	Walsall	Spotland
20:00 GMT				Stadium: Crown Oil Arena
Note: Fixture was initially scheduled for 20 February, but was brought forward to the Thursday night for live Sky Sports broadcasting.

=== FA Cup ===
Rochdale were drawn away to Fleetwood Town in the first round and home to Newport County in the second round.

Win Draw Loss Fixtures

7 November 2026 First round	Fleetwood Town	1–2 (a.e.t.)	Rochdale	Fleetwood
15:00 GMT	Batty (yellow card) 9'; Coughlan 74' (pen.); Neal (yellow card) 116'	Report	Hannant 23'; Gilmour (yellow card) 34'; Adeeko 111'; Hayes (yellow card) 113'	Stadium: Highbury Stadium; Attendance: 2,026 (673 away); Referee: William Davis

5 December 2026 Second round	Rochdale	v	Newport County	Spotland
15:00 GMT				Stadium: Crown Oil Arena

=== EFL Cup ===
Rochdale were drawn against Tranmere Rovers away in the preliminary round.

Win Draw Loss Fixtures

1 August 2026 Preliminary round	Tranmere Rovers	2–2 (1–2 p)	Rochdale	Birkenhead
15:00 BST	Whitaker 4', (yellow card) 87'; Senior (yellow card) 42'; Davies (yellow card) 53', (goal) 60'	Report	East 11'; Silcott-Duberry 85'	Stadium: Prenton Park; Referee: Oliver Mackey
	Penalties
	Davies (penalty scored); Okoro (penalty missed); Ince (penalty missed); Whitaker (penalty missed); Baker-Richardson (penalty missed)		Dieseruvwe (penalty missed); Ebanks-Landell (penalty missed); Francis (penalty scored); Silcott-Duberry (penalty scored)

8 August 2025 First round	Bradford City	2–0	Rochdale	Bradford
15:00 BST	Swan 45+1'; Baldwin 67'	Report	Rodney (yellow card) 22'; Brown (yellow card) 77'	Stadium: Mbanq Valley Parade; Attendance: 6,915 (1,110 away); Referee: Declan Brown

=== EFL Trophy ===
==== Group stage ====
Rochdale were drawn against Doncaster Rovers, Huddersfield Town and Liverpool U21 side into Northern Group H.

Pos	Div	Team	Pld	W	PW	PL	L	GF	GA	GD	Pts	Qualification
1	L1	Huddersfield Town	3	3	0	0	0	12	1	+11	9	Advance to Round 2
2	L1	Doncaster Rovers	3	2	0	0	1	6	4	+2	6	Advance to Round 2
3	ACA	Liverpool U21	3	0	1	0	2	3	8	−5	2	
4	L2	Rochdale	3	0	0	1	2	4	12	−8	1	

Source: EFL

Win Draw Loss Fixtures

22 September 2026 Group stage	Rochdale	3–3 (6–7 p)	Liverpool U21	Spotland
19:00 BST	Rodney 37'; Silcott-Duberry (yellow card) 74'; Henderson 77', 80'; Hannant (yellow card) 90+3'	Report	Ndiaye (red card) 21'; Wright 42'; Trueman 90+4'; Sonni-Lambie 90+6'	Stadium: Crown Oil Arena; Attendance: 946; Referee: Gareth Thomas
	Penalties
	Silcott-Duberry (penalty scored); Middleton (penalty scored); Francis (penalty scored); Henderson (penalty scored); Hayes (penalty scored); Sherring (penalty scored); Waller (penalty missed)		Wright (penalty scored); Trueman (penalty scored); O'Connor (penalty scored); Bradshaw (penalty scored); Chambers (penalty scored); Sonni-Lambie (penalty scored); Onanuga (penalty scored)

6 October 2026 Group stage	Huddersfield Town	5–0	Rochdale	Huddersfield
19:00 BST	Gooch 13'; Smith-Sway 15'; Ashia 56'; Tovide 79'; Schofield (red card) 88'; Spencer 90+4'	Report	Francis (yellow card) 15'	Stadium: Accu Stadium; Attendance: 1,666; Referee: Paul Marsden

3 November 2026 Group stage	Rochdale	1–4	Doncaster Rovers	Spotland
19:00 GMT	Henderson 15'; Hannant (yellow card) 67'	Report	May 54'; Hanlan 63'; Clifton (yellow card) 74'; Bailey 88'; Hutchinson 90+2'	Stadium: Crown Oil Arena; Attendance: 645 (202 away); Referee: Martin Woods

== Squad statistics ==
=== Appearances and goals ===
As of match played 21 November 2026

Italics indicate a loaned in player.

No.	Pos	Nat	Player	Total		League Two		FA Cup		EFL Cup		EFL Trophy	
No.	Pos	Nat	Player	Apps	Goals	Apps	Goals	Apps	Goals	Apps	Goals	Apps	Goals
1	GK	(Sweden) SWE	Nils Ramming	11	0	9+0	0	0+0	0	2+0	0	0+0	0
2	DF	(England) ENG	Charlie Tasker	12	2	10+0	2	1+0	0	0+0	0	0+1	0
3	DF	(England) ENG	Kaiden Wilson	20	0	16+0	0	1+0	0	0+1	0	2+0	0
4	MF	(England) ENG	Ryan East	8	1	3+2	0	0+1	0	2+0	1	0+0	0
5	DF	(England) ENG	Laurence Maguire	2	0	0+2	0	0+0	0	0+0	0	0+0	0
6	DF	(England) ENG	Ethan Ebanks-Landell	8	1	4+1	1	0+1	0	2+0	0	0+0	0
7	FW	(Republic of Ireland) IRL	Cian Hayes	14	2	6+3	2	0+1	0	1+0	0	1+2	0
8	MF	(England) ENG	Harvey Gilmour	19	0	13+2	0	1+0	0	2+0	0	0+1	0
9	FW	(England) ENG	Emmanuel Dieseruvwe	15	0	5+6	0	0+0	0	2+0	0	2+0	0
10	FW	(England) ENG	Devante Rodney	5	1	1+1	0	0+0	0	1+1	0	1+0	1
11	FW	(England) ENG	Zain Silcott-Duberry	16	1	5+5	0	1+0	0	1+1	1	3+0	0
13	DF	(England) ENG	Tobi Adebayo-Rowling	16	0	9+2	0	1+0	0	2+0	0	2+0	0
14	MF	(England) ENG	Ed Francis	20	1	7+7	1	0+1	0	1+1	0	3+0	0
16	MF	(England) ENG	Casey Pettit	1	0	0+0	0	0+0	0	0+1	0	0+0	0
17	MF	(Republic of Ireland) IRL	Baba Adeeko	18	2	13+3	1	0+1	1	0+0	0	0+1	0
18	FW	(England) ENG	Jonny Smith	7	1	3+4	1	0+0	0	0+0	0	0+0	0
19	MF	(England) ENG	Luke Hannant	17	2	5+6	1	1+0	1	2+0	0	3+0	0
20	GK	(England) ENG	Sam Waller	11	0	7+0	0	1+0	0	0+0	0	3+0	0
21	MF	(England) ENG	Kane Taylor	13	0	10+2	0	0+0	0	0+0	0	1+0	0
22	DF	(England) ENG	Dan Moss	8	1	6+0	1	0+0	0	0+2	0	0+0	0
24	MF	(England) ENG	Jamie Allen	2	0	2+0	0	0+0	0	0+0	0	0+0	0
26	DF	(England) ENG	Sam Sherring	12	0	6+1	0	0+0	0	2+0	0	3+0	0
27	DF	(England) ENG	Bryant Bilongo	6	0	1+1	0	0+1	0	2+0	0	1+0	0
33	DF	(England) ENG	Sam Beckwith	6	0	0+4	0	0+0	0	0+0	0	2+0	0
35	MF	(England) ENG	Jamie Paterson	5	0	0+3	0	1+0	0	0+0	0	1+0	0
39	FW	(Jamaica) JAM	Dajaune Brown	18	4	16+0	4	1+0	0	0+1	0	0+0	0
40	FW	(England) ENG	Ian Henderson	11	5	0+8	2	0+0	0	0+0	0	3+0	3
44	DF	(England) ENG	Aden Flint	13	2	11+0	2	1+0	0	0+0	0	0+1	0
45	FW	(Scotland) SCO	Glenn Middleton	15	0	10+2	0	1+0	0	0+0	0	1+1	0
54	DF	(England) ENG	Tom Bradley	3	0	0+0	0	0+0	0	0+1	0	1+1	0
56	MF	(England) ENG	Reece Leonard	1	0	0+0	0	0+0	0	0+0	0	0+1	0
57	MF	(England) ENG	Israel Pither	2	0	0+0	0	0+0	0	0+0	0	0+2	0
58	MF	(England) ENG	Fabian Nowacki	1	0	0+0	0	0+0	0	0+0	0	0+1	0
61	MF	(England) ENG	Lucas Cunliffe	1	0	0+0	0	0+0	0	0+0	0	0+1	0
63	MF	(England) ENG	Ronnie Brown	1	0	0+0	0	0+0	0	0+0	0	0+1	0

=== Disciplinary record ===
As of match played 21 November 2026

Includes all competitive matches. The list is sorted by squad number when disciplinary points / points per card / number of cards are equal. Players with no cards not included in the list.

Rank	No.	Pos.	Nat.	Name	League Two			FA Cup			EFL Cup			EFL Trophy			Total			
Rank	No.	Pos.	Nat.	Name	Yellow card	Second yellow card	Red card	Yellow card	Second yellow card	Red card	Yellow card	Second yellow card	Red card	Yellow card	Second yellow card	Red card	Yellow card	Second yellow card	Red card	
1	8	CM	(England)	Harvey Gilmour	4	0	0	1	0	0	0	0	0	0	0	0	5	0	0	
1	13	RB	(England)	Tobi Adebayo-Rowling	3	1	0	0	0	0	0	0	0	0	0	0	3	1	0	
3	14	CDM	(England)	Ed Francis	1	1	0	0	0	0	0	0	0	1	0	0	2	1	0	
4	7	RW	(Republic of Ireland)	Cian Hayes	2	0	0	1	0	0	0	0	0	0	0	0	3	0	0	
4	19	LM	(England)	Luke Hannant	1	0	0	0	0	0	0	0	0	2	0	0	3	0	0	
6	17	CDM	(Republic of Ireland)	Baba Adeeko	2	0	0	0	0	0	0	0	0	0	0	0	2	0	0	
6	22	RB	(England)	Dan Moss	2	0	0	0	0	0	0	0	0	0	0	0	2	0	0	
6	27	LB	(England)	Bryant Bilongo	0	1	0	0	0	0	0	0	0	0	0	0	0	1	0	
6	45	LW	(Scotland)	Glenn Middleton	2	0	0	0	0	0	0	0	0	0	0	0	2	0	0	
8	1	GK	(Sweden)	Nils Ramming	1	0	0	0	0	0	0	0	0	0	0	0	1	0	0	
8	3	CB	(England)	Kaiden Wilson	1	0	0	0	0	0	0	0	0	0	0	0	1	0	0	
8	6	CB	(England)	Ethan Ebanks-Landell	1	0	0	0	0	0	0	0	0	0	0	0	1	0	0	
8	10	RW	(England)	Devante Rodney	0	0	0	0	0	0	1	0	0	0	0	0	1	0	0	
8	11	LM	(England)	Zain Silcott-Duberry	0	0	0	0	0	0	0	0	0	1	0	0	1	0	0	
8	21	CM	(England)	Kane Taylor	1	0	0	0	0	0	0	0	0	0	0	0	1	0	0	
8	24	CM	(England)	Jamie Allen	1	0	0	0	0	0	0	0	0	0	0	0	1	0	0	
8	26	CB	(England)	Sam Sherring	1	0	0	0	0	0	0	0	0	0	0	0	1	0	0	
8	33	LB	(England)	Sam Beckwith	1	0	0	0	0	0	0	0	0	0	0	0	1	0	0	
8	39	CF	(Jamaica)	Dajaune Brown	0	0	0	0	0	0	1	0	0	0	0	0	1	0	0	
8	Total					24	3	0	2	0	0	2	0	0	4	0	0	32	3	0

== Awards ==
=== Player awards ===
==== PFA League Two Fans' Player of the Month ====
Month	Player	Result	Ref.
September	(England) Aden Flint	Nominated	
