= Samuel Waller =

Samuel or Sam Waller may refer to:

- Samuel Edmund Waller (1850–1903), English painter
- Samuel Gardner Waller (1881–1955), United States Army general
- Sam Waller (born 2003), English footballer, see 2024–25 Rochdale A.F.C. season

== See also ==
- Sam Waller Museum
