= 2024–25 Rochdale A.F.C. season =

English football club season

Rochdale A.F.C.
2024–25 season
- Chairman: Simon Gauge
- Manager: Jimmy McNulty
- Stadium: Crown Oil Arena
- National League: 4th
- FA Cup: 1st Round
- Top goalscorer: League: Devante Rodney (17); All: Devante Rodney (20)

The 2024–25 season was Rochdale A.F.C.'s 118th in existence and their second consecutive in the National League. The club also competed in the FA Cup, FA Trophy and the newly formed National League Cup.

== Squad statistics ==
=== Appearances and goals ===
No.	Pos	Nat	Player	Total		National League		FA Cup		FA Trophy		NL Cup		Play-offs	
No.	Pos	Nat	Player	Apps	Goals	Apps	Goals	Apps	Goals	Apps	Goals	Apps	Goals	Apps	Goals
1	GK	(Republic of Ireland) IRL	Luke McNicholas	9	0	9+0	0	0+0	0	0+0	0	0+0	0	0+0	0
1	GK	(Republic of Ireland) IRL	Killian Barrett	11	0	9+0	0	0+0	0	1+0	0	0+0	0	1+0	0
2	DF	(England) ENG	Kyron Gordon	46	2	38+0	2	2+0	0	5+0	0	0+0	0	1+0	0
3	DF	(England) ENG	Finlay Armstrong	15	0	2+10	0	0+0	0	0+0	0	3+0	0	0+0	0
4	MF	(England) ENG	Ryan East	44	2	36+1	2	2+0	0	3+1	0	0+0	0	1+0	0
5	MF	(England) ENG	Aaron Henry	16	1	8+6	1	1+0	0	0+0	0	1+0	0	0+0	0
6	DF	(England) ENG	Ethan Ebanks-Landell	16	0	11+4	0	0+0	0	0+0	0	0+0	0	1+0	0
7	MF	(Tanzania) TAN	Tarryn Allarakhia	52	5	34+8	4	2+0	0	4+0	1	2+1	0	1+0	0
8	MF	(England) ENG	Harvey Gilmour	43	2	34+3	2	0+0	0	5+0	0	0+0	0	1+0	0
9	FW	(Grenada) GRN	Kairo Mitchell	51	19	35+9	14	2+0	3	2+2	2	0+0	0	0+1	0
10	FW	(England) ENG	Devante Rodney	39	20	28+7	17	0+0	0	3+0	1	0+0	0	1+0	2
11	FW	(Nigeria) NGR	Ody Alfa	5	0	0+3	0	0+0	0	0+0	0	0+2	0	0+0	0
11	FW	(England) ENG	Michael Adu-Poku	7	0	4+3	0	0+0	0	0+0	0	0+0	0	0+0	0
12	GK	(England) ENG	Bradley Kelly	5	0	0+1	0	0+0	0	0+0	0	4+0	0	0+0	0
13	GK	(England) ENG	Sam Waller	24	0	20+0	0	0+0	0	4+0	0	0+0	0	0+0	0
14	DF	(England) ENG	Tobi Adebayo-Rowling	46	2	36+3	1	1+0	0	3+1	1	1+0	0	1+0	0
15	FW	(Nigeria) NGR	Leon Ayinde	34	3	11+16	2	0+0	0	2+2	0	2+0	1	0+1	0
16	DF	(Scotland) SCO	Kyle Ferguson	22	0	6+9	0	0+1	0	2+0	0	4+0	0	0+0	0
17	MF	(England) ENG	Courtney Senior	9	0	1+5	0	0+1	0	0+0	0	1+1	0	0+0	0
18	MF	(England) ENG	Aidan Barlow	34	6	18+8	2	0+1	1	3+1	1	2+0	2	1+0	0
19	MF	(England) ENG	Jake Burger	31	1	13+12	1	2+0	0	1+1	0	2+0	0	0+0	0
20	DF	(England) ENG	Dan Sassi	4	0	4+0	0	0+0	0	0+0	0	0+0	0	0+0	0
21	MF	(Scotland) SCO	Connor McBride	35	4	19+12	4	1+0	0	1+0	0	1+1	0	0+0	0
22	FW	(England) ENG	Matthew Dennis	10	2	1+3	0	1+0	0	0+2	1	3+0	1	0+0	0
24	MF	(England) ENG	Corey Edwards	11	0	5+1	0	0+1	0	0+0	0	3+1	0	0+0	0
25	FW	(England) ENG	Joe Westley	3	0	0+3	0	0+0	0	0+0	0	0+0	0	0+0	0
26	DF	(England) ENG	Liam Hogan	36	0	26+3	0	2+0	0	3+0	0	1+0	0	0+1	0
27	DF	(England) ENG	Matt Penney	2	0	0+1	0	0+0	0	0+0	0	1+0	0	0+0	0
27	FW	(England) ENG	Jay Bird	11	6	6+3	4	0+0	0	1+0	1	0+0	0	1+0	1
28	DF	(Scotland) SCO	Jack Kingdon	17	0	9+7	0	0+0	0	0+1	0	0+0	0	0+0	0
29	DF	(Germany) GER	Jid Okeke	14	0	6+2	0	0+0	0	1+2	0	2+1	0	0+0	0
30	DF	(England) ENG	Jili Buyabu	33	0	16+6	0	2+0	0	2+2	0	3+1	0	0+1	0
31	GK	(Wales) WAL	David Robson	10	0	8+0	0	2+0	0	0+0	0	0+0	0	0+0	0
31	MF	(England) ENG	Charlie Weston	16	1	1+7	0	0+0	0	2+2	0	3+0	1	0+1	0
32	MF	(England) ENG	Isaac Burgess	2	0	0+0	0	0+0	0	0+0	0	1+1	0	0+0	0
33	DF	(England) ENG	Sam Beckwith	52	3	43+1	2	2+0	1	4+0	0	0+1	0	1+0	0
39	FW	(Northern Ireland) NIR	Oscar Kelly	2	0	0+0	0	0+0	0	0+0	0	1+1	0	0+0	0
40	FW	(England) ENG	Ian Henderson	52	13	9+32	9	0+2	1	2+2	0	3+1	3	0+1	0
41	DF	(England) ENG	Ben Horne	2	0	0+0	0	0+0	0	0+0	0	1+1	0	0+0	0
45	DF	(England) ENG	Joe Akpan	1	0	0+0	0	0+0	0	0+0	0	0+1	0	0+0	0
47	MF	(England) ENG	Lucas Martinez	1	0	0+0	0	0+0	0	0+0	0	0+1	0	0+0	0

=== Goals record ===
Rank	No.	Nat.	Po.	Name	National League	FA Cup	FA Trophy	NL Cup	Play-offs	Total
1	10	FW	(England)	Devante Rodney	17	0	1	0	2	20
2	9	FW	(Grenada)	Kairo Mitchell	14	3	2	0	0	19
3	40	FW	(England)	Ian Henderson	9	1	0	3	0	13
4	18	MF	(England)	Aidan Barlow	2	1	1	2	0	6
4	27	FW	(England)	Jay Bird	4	0	1	0	1	6
6	7	MF	(Tanzania)	Tarryn Allarakhia	4	0	1	0	0	5
7	21	MF	(Scotland)	Connor McBride	4	0	0	0	0	4
8	15	FW	(Nigeria)	Leon Ayinde	2	0	0	1	0	3
8	33	DF	(England)	Sam Beckwith	2	0	0	0	0	3
10	2	DF	(England)	Kyron Gordon	2	0	0	0	0	2
10	4	MF	(England)	Ryan East	2	0	0	0	0	2
10	8	MF	(England)	Harvey Gilmour	2	0	0	0	0	2
10	14	DF	(England)	Tobi Adebayo-Rowling	1	0	1	0	0	2
10	22	FW	(England)	Matthew Dennis	0	0	1	1	0	2
15	5	MF	(England)	Aaron Henry	1	0	0	0	0	1
15	19	MF	(England)	Jake Burger	1	0	0	0	0	1
15	31	MF	(England)	Charlie Weston	0	0	0	1	0	1
Total					67	5	8	8	3	92

=== Disciplinary record ===
Rank	No.	Nat.	Po.	Name	National League			FA Cup			FA Trophy			NL Cup			Play-offs			Total		
Rank	No.	Nat.	Po.	Name	Yellow card	(yellow card) (yellow-red card)	Red card	Yellow card	(yellow card) (yellow-red card)	Red card	Yellow card	(yellow card) (yellow-red card)	Red card	Yellow card	(yellow card) (yellow-red card)	Red card	Yellow card	(yellow card) (yellow-red card)	Red card	Yellow card	(yellow card) (yellow-red card)	Red card
1	33	DF	(England)	Sam Beckwith	7	1	0	1	0	0	0	0	0	0	0	0	0	0	0	8	1	0
2	9	FW	(Grenada)	Kairo Mitchell	8	0	0	0	0	0	0	0	0	0	0	0	0	0	0	8	0	0
3	7	MF	(Tanzania)	Tarryn Allarakhia	5	0	0	0	0	0	0	0	0	1	0	0	0	0	0	6	0	0
4	26	DF	(England)	Liam Hogan	3	0	0	1	0	0	0	0	0	0	0	0	1	0	0	5	0	0
5	14	DF	(England)	Tobi Adebayo-Rowling	4	0	0	0	0	0	0	0	0	0	0	0	0	0	0	4	0	0
5	8	MF	(England)	Harvey Gilmour	4	0	0	0	0	0	0	0	0	0	0	0	0	0	0	4	0	0
5	2	DF	(England)	Kyron Gordon	3	0	0	0	0	0	0	0	0	0	0	0	1	0	0	4	0	0
8	18	MF	(England)	Aidan Barlow	2	0	0	0	0	0	0	0	0	0	0	0	1	0	0	3	0	0
8	19	MF	(England)	Jake Burger	3	0	0	0	0	0	0	0	0	0	0	0	0	0	0	3	0	0
8	30	DF	(England)	Jili Buyabu	2	0	0	0	0	0	0	0	0	1	0	0	0	0	0	3	0	0
11	4	MF	(England)	Ryan East	2	0	0	0	0	0	0	0	0	0	0	0	0	0	0	2	0	0
11	6	DF	(England)	Ethan Ebanks-Landell	2	0	0	0	0	0	0	0	0	0	0	0	0	0	0	2	0	0
11	28	DF	(Scotland)	Jack Kingdon	2	0	0	0	0	0	0	0	0	0	0	0	0	0	0	2	0	0
11	16	DF	(Scotland)	Kyle Ferguson	1	0	0	0	0	0	0	0	0	1	0	0	0	0	0	2	0	0
15	3	DF	(England)	Finlay Armstrong	0	0	0	0	0	0	0	0	0	0	1	0	0	0	0	0	1	0
16	5	MF	(England)	Aaron Henry	1	0	0	0	0	0	0	0	0	0	0	0	0	0	0	1	0	0
16	21	MF	(Scotland)	Connor McBride	1	0	0	0	0	0	0	0	0	0	0	0	0	0	0	1	0	0
16	29	DF	(Germany)	Jid Okeke	1	0	0	0	0	0	0	0	0	0	0	0	0	0	0	1	0	0
16	31	GK	(Wales)	David Robson	1	0	0	0	0	0	0	0	0	0	0	0	0	0	0	1	0	0
16	10	FW	(England)	Devante Rodney	1	0	0	0	0	0	0	0	0	0	0	0	0	0	0	1	0	0
16	17	MF	(England)	Courtney Senior	0	0	0	0	0	0	0	0	0	1	0	0	0	0	0	1	0	0
16	24	MF	(England)	Corey Edwards	0	0	0	0	0	0	0	0	0	1	0	0	0	0	0	1	0	0
Total					53	1	0	2	0	0	0	0	0	5	1	0	3	0	0	63	2	0

== Transfers ==
=== In ===
Date	Pos	Player	Transferred from	Fee	Ref
3 June 2024	MF	(Scotland) Connor McBride	(England) Gateshead	Undisclosed	
4 June 2024	DF	(England) Tobi Adebayo-Rowling	(England) Notts County	Undisclosed	
6 June 2024	DF	(England) Finlay Armstrong	(England) Fleetwood Town	Undisclosed	
10 June 2024	MF	(Tanzania) Tarryn Allarakhia	(England) Wealdstone	Undisclosed	
1 July 2024	MF	(England) Aidan Barlow	(England) Eastleigh	Free	
5 July 2024	DF	(England) Sam Beckwith	(England) Maidenhead United	Undisclosed	
25 July 2024	FW	(Nigeria) Ody Alfa	(England) Chelmsford City	Undisclosed	
30 July 2024	MF	(England) Jake Burger	(England) Luton Town	Undisclosed	
9 August 2024	MF	(England) Courtney Senior	(England) Barnet	Undisclosed	
7 September 2024	GK	(Wales) David Robson	(England) Hull City	Undisclosed	
27 September 2024	DF	(England) Liam Hogan	(England) Oldham Athletic	Undisclosed	
11 October 2024	GK	(England) Josh Lillis	(England) Barrow	Undisclosed	
16 November 2024	DF	(England) Matt Penney	(England) Ipswich Town	Undisclosed	
3 December 2024	MF	(England) Charlie Weston	(England) Barrow	Undisclosed	

=== Out ===
Date	Pos	Player	Transferred to	Fee	Ref
18 June 2024	DF	(Wales) George Nevett	(England) Peterborough United	Undisclosed	
29 June 2024	MF	(Republic of Ireland) Jimmy Keohane	(Republic of Ireland) Galway United	Undisclosed	
2 July 2024	DF	(England) Cameron John	(England) York City	Released	
3 July 2024	MF	(Nigeria) Jesurun Uchegbulam	(England) Oldham Athletic	Undisclosed	
16 November 2024	GK	(Wales) David Robson	(England) Alfreton Town	Undisclosed	
21 December 2024	FW	(Nigeria) Ody Alfa	(England) Slough Town	Undisclosed	
7 January 2025	DF	(England) Matt Penney	(England) Altrincham	Undisclosed	
23 May 2025	FW	(Grenada) Kairo Mitchell	(England) Forest Green Rovers	Released	
23 May 2025	GK	(England) Bradley Kelly	(England) Lancaster City	Released	
23 May 2025	MF	(Scotland) Kyle Ferguson	(England) Yeovil Town	Released	
23 May 2025	MF	(England) Courtney Senior	(England) Maldon & Tiptree	Released	
23 May 2025	MF	(England) Charlie Weston	(England) Curzon Ashton	Released	

=== Loaned in ===
Date	Pos	Player	Loaned from	Date until	Ref
9 July 2024	MF	(England) Aaron Henry	(England) Charlton Athletic	7 January 2025	
15 July 2024	GK	(Republic of Ireland) Luke McNicholas	(England) Wrexham	1 February 2025	
30 August 2024	FW	(Republic of Ireland) Leon Ayinde	(England) Ipswich Town	End of season	
2 September 2024	DF	(England) Dan Sassi	(England) Blackpool	16 November 2024	
7 September 2024	FW	(England) Joe Westley	(England) Burnley	8 October 2024	
12 October 2024	DF	(England) Jili Buyabu	(England) Sheffield United	End of season	
31 October 2024	FW	(England) Matthew Dennis	(England) MK Dons	30 January 2025	
31 October 2024	DF	(Germany) Jidechi Okeke	(England) Stockport County	End of season	
16 November 2024	GK	(England) Sam Waller	(England) Burnley	End of season	
25 January 2025	DF	(Scotland) Jack Kingdon	(England) Manchester United	End of season	
25 February 2025	FW	(England) Jay Bird	(England) Exeter City	End of season	
11 March 2025	FW	(England) Michael Adu-Poku	(England) Watford	End of season	
28 March 2025	GK	(Republic of Ireland) Killian Barrett	(England) Sheffield Wednesday	End of season	

=== Loaned out ===
Date	Pos	Player	Loaned to	Date until	Ref
6 December 2024	MF	(England) Courtney Senior	(England) Chorley	End of season	
24 January 2025	DF	(England) Finlay Armstrong	(England) King's Lynn	1 April 2025	
14 March 2025	DF	(Scotland) Kyle Ferguson	(England) Yeovil Town	12 April 2025	

== Pre-season and friendlies ==
Win Draw Loss Fixtures

13 July 2024	Warrington Town	3–0	Rochdale	Warrington
15:00 BST	Harris 12'; Trialist 31'; McDonald 37'	Report		Stadium: Cantilever Park

20 July 2024	Fleetwood Town	1–1	Rochdale	Fleetwood
13:00 BST	Graydon 1'	Report	Rodney	Stadium: Highbury Stadium

23 July 2024	Macclesfield	2–2	Rochdale	Macclesfield
19:45 BST	Rooney 70' (pen.); Duffy 84'	Report	Rodney 4'; McBride 78'	Stadium: Moss Rose

27 July 2024	Rochdale	2–1	Carlisle United	Rochdale
15:00 BST	Mitchell 42'; Henry 49'	Report	Butterworth 72'	Stadium: Spotland Stadium

30 July 2024	Avro	1–0	Rochdale	Oldham
19:45 BST	Ellis 54'	Report	Barlow (penalty missed)	Stadium: Whitebank Stadium

3 August 2024	Rochdale	5–2	Salford City	Rochdale
15:00 BST	Mitchell 15', 30'; Henry 35'; Rodney 45'; McBride 89'	Report	Ashley 3'; Dackers 50'	Stadium: Spotland Stadium

== Competitions ==
Win Draw Loss Fixtures

=== Overall record ===
Competition	Starting round	Record							
Competition	Starting round	Pld	W	D	L	GF	GA	GD	Win %
National League	Matchday 1	47	21	11	15	72	48	+24	44.68
FA Cup	Fourth qualifying round	2	1	0	1	7	5	+2	50.00
FA Trophy	Third round	5	3	2	0	8	3	+5	60.00
NL Cup	First round	4	2	1	1	6	2	+4	50.00
Total		58	27	14	17	93	58	+35	46.55

Source: Soccerway

=== National League ===
==== League table ====
Pos	Team	Pld	W	D	L	GF	GA	GD	Pts	Promotion, qualification or relegation
2	York City	46	29	9	8	95	42	+53	96	Qualification for National League play-off semi-finals
3	Forest Green Rovers	46	22	17	7	69	42	+27	83	Qualification for National League play-off semi-finals
4	Rochdale	46	21	11	14	69	44	+25	74	Qualification for the National League play-off quarter-finals
5	Oldham Athletic (O, P)	46	19	16	11	64	48	+16	73	Qualification for the National League play-off quarter-finals
6	FC Halifax Town	46	19	13	14	50	46	+4	70	Qualification for the National League play-off quarter-finals

Source: National League official site
Rules for classification: 1) Points; 2) Goal difference; 3) Number of goals scored; 4) Number of matches won; 5) Head-to-head results
(O) Play-off winners; (P) Promoted

==== Results summary ====
Overall								Home						Away					
Pld	W	D	L	GF	GA	GD	Pts	W	D	L	GF	GA	GD	W	D	L	GF	GA	GD
46	21	11	14	69	44	+25	74	13	4	6	43	21	+22	8	7	8	26	23	+3

Last updated: pre-season.
Source: Soccerway

==== Results by round ====
Round	1	2	3	4	5	6	7	8	9	10	11	12	13	14	15	16	17	18	19	20	21	22	23	24	25	26	27	28	29	30	31	32	33	34	35	36	37	38	39	40	41	42	43	44	45	46
Ground	A	H	A	H	A	H	A	H	H	A	A	H	A	H	H	A	H	A	A	A	H	A	A	H	H	H	A	A	H	A	H	H	H	A	H	A	H	H	A	A	H	A	H	H	A	A
Result	W	D	L	D	W	W	W	W	L	L	W	W	D	L	W	L	W	L	W	L	W	W	L	W	L	D	D	D	L	D	W	W	W	D	L	D	L	W	D	L	W	W	D	W	W	L
Position	3	6	12	13	7	4	3	2	5	5	4	4	5	6	4	6	5	6	6	9	6	6	8	6	7	8	8	9	10	10	9	8	7	7	7	7	7	6	6	7	6	5	5	4	4	4

Updated to match(es) played on pre-season. Source: Soccerway
A = Away; H = Home; W = Win; D = Draw; L = Loss

==== Matches ====
10 August 2024 1	Boston United	0–3	Rochdale	Boston
15:00 BST	Mills (yellow card) 38'; Hill (yellow card) 90+1'	Report	Rodney 15', 40'; Gilmour (yellow card) 28'; Beckwith (yellow card) 45+3'; Adebayo-Rowling (yellow card) 53'; Allarakhia (yellow card) 80'; Henderson 90+2'	Stadium: Boston Community Stadium; Attendance: 2,578; Referee: Zac Kennard-Kettle

17 August 2024 2	Rochdale	1–1	Dagenham & Redbridge	Rochdale
15:00 BST	Gordon (yellow card) 75'; Allarakhia 76'	Report	Pereira 52'; Mahorn (yellow card) 80'; Lawless (yellow card) 90+4'	Stadium: Spotland Stadium; Attendance: 2,631; Referee: Scott Jackson

20 August 2024 3	York City	1–0	Rochdale	York
19:45 BST	Aguiar 4'; Howe (yellow card) 53'; Armstrong (yellow card) 62'; O'Connor (yellow card) 69'; Hunt (yellow card) 76'; John-Lewis (yellow card) 83'; Male (yellow card) 90+2'	Report	Ebanks-Landell (yellow card) 25'	Stadium: York Community Stadium; Attendance: 5,362; Referee: John Mulligan

24 August 2024 4	Rochdale	0–0	Forest Green Rovers	Rochdale
15:00 BST		Report	Sercombe (yellow card) 66'	Stadium: Spotland Stadium; Attendance: 2,261; Referee: Andrew Miller

26 August 2024 5	Yeovil Town	0–1	Rochdale	Yeovil
15:00 BST	Jarvis (yellow card) 90+5'	Report	Allarakhia (yellow card) 41'; Henry (yellow card) 48'; McBride 90+1'; Ferguson (yellow card) 90+5'; Beckwith (yellow card) 90+8'	Stadium: Huish Park; Attendance: 3,686; Referee: Alan Dale

31 August 2024 6	Rochdale	3–0	Woking	Rochdale
15:00 BST	Mitchell 5', 88' (yellow card) 40'; Henry 60'	Report	Dyche (yellow card) 32'	Stadium: Spotland Stadium; Attendance: 2,315; Referee: William Davis

7 September 2024 7	Aldershot Town	0–2	Rochdale	Aldershot
17:30 BST	Menayese (yellow card) 35'; Maghoma (yellow card) 58'; Barrett (yellow card) 90+1'	Report	Mitchell 13'; Rodney 27'; Burger (yellow card) 47'	Stadium: Recreation Ground; Attendance: 2,565; Referee: James Durkin

10 September 2024 8	Rochdale	3–1	Maidenhead United	Rochdale
19:45 BST	East 18'; Mitchell 41', 47'; Adebayo-Rowling (yellow card) 52'	Report	Ajose 61'; Golding (yellow card) 90+4'	Stadium: Spotland Stadium; Attendance: 2,313; Referee: Paul Cooper

14 September 2024 9	Rochdale	1–2	Solihull Moors	Rochdale
15:00 BST	Mitchell (yellow card) 65' (goal) 86'	Report	Wilkinson 26', 59'; Stevenson (yellow card) 33'; Newton (yellow card) 81'	Stadium: Spotland Stadium; Attendance: 2,614; Referee: James Bancroft

21 September 2024 10	Eastleigh	4–2	Rochdale	Eastleigh
15:00 BST	McCallum 22', 77' (pen.); Francillette 35'; Shade (yellow card) 39'; Maguire 60'	Report	Mitchell 6' (yellow card) 75'; Beckwith (yellow card) 34'; Robson (yellow card) 42'; Gilmour (yellow card) 61'; Rodney 70'	Stadium: Ten Acres; Attendance: 1,836; Referee: Aaron Farmer

24 September 2024 11	Hartlepool United	0–3	Rochdale	Hartlepool
19:45 BST	Sheron (yellow card) 36'	Report	McBride 45'; Burger (yellow card) 56'; Mitchell 58'; Rodney 79'	Stadium: Victoria Park; Attendance: 4,012; Referee: Martin Woods

28 September 2024 12	Rochdale	1–0	Braintree Town	Rochdale
15:00 BST	Mitchell 7'; Gordon (yellow card) 85'	Report	Vennings (yellow card) 5'; Marshall-Miranda (yellow card) 83'	Stadium: Spotland Stadium; Attendance: 2,609; Referee: Gareth Rhodes

5 October 2024 13	Ebbsfleet United	2–2	Rochdale	Northfleet
15:00 BST	Wright (yellow card) 34'; Dallison (yellow card) 40'; Chapman 64'; Bingham 67' (pen.)	Report	Allarakhia 36'; McBride 45'	Stadium: Stonebridge Road; Attendance: 1,452; Referee: Wayne Cartmel

19 October 2024 14	Rochdale	0–1	Southend United	Rochdale
17:30 BST	Allarakhia (yellow card) 26'; Buyabu (yellow card) 49'	Report	Walker 45+3'; Gubbins (yellow card) 55'; Crowther (yellow card) 79'; Forson (yellow card) 90+6'	Stadium: Spotland Stadium; Attendance: 2,806; Referee: Stuart Morland

22 October 2024 15	Rochdale	2–1	FC Halifax Town	Rochdale
19:45 BST	Allarakhia (yellow card) 19'; Gordon 40'; Mitchell (yellow card) 43'; McBride 81'	Report	Senior (yellow card) 11'; Waters 76'	Stadium: Spotland Stadium; Attendance: 2,926; Referee: Michael Barlow

26 October 2024 16	Barnet	2–1	Rochdale	Edgware
15:00 BST	Kabamba 6'; Coker 41'; Collinge (yellow card) 78'; Clifford (yellow card) 90+2'	Report	Hogan (yellow card) 20'; Gordon (yellow card) 46'; Henderson 70'	Stadium: The Hive Stadium; Attendance: 2,137; Referee: Jacob Miles

9 November 2024 17	Rochdale	2–1	Sutton United	Rochdale
15:00 GMT	East 22'; Rodney 90+3'	Report	Vaz 29'; Harris (yellow card) 45+6'	Stadium: Spotland Stadium; Attendance: 2,602; Referee: Richard Aspinall

16 November 2024 18	Wealdstone	2–0	Rochdale	Ruislip
15:00 GMT	Kretzschmar 46'; Cesay 67'	Report	Barlow (yellow card) 90+4'	Stadium: Grosvenor Vale; Attendance: 1,922; Referee: Stephen Parkinson

23 November 2024	Rochdale	P–P	Oldham Athletic	Rochdale
12:30 GMT				Stadium: Spotland Stadium
Note: Postponed due to a waterlogged pitch.

26 November 2024 19	Gateshead	0–1	Rochdale	Gateshead
19:45 GMT	Booty (yellow card) 25'	Report	Beckwith (yellow card) 16' (yellow-red card) 53'; Tinkler 55' (o.g.)	Stadium: Gateshead International Stadium; Attendance: 712; Referee: Paul Marsden

30 November 2024	Rochdale	P–P	Tamworth	Rochdale
15:00 GMT				Stadium: Spotland Stadium
Note: Postponed due to Tamworth's FA Cup progression.

14 December 2024 20	Dagenham & Redbridge	1–0	Rochdale	Dagenham
15:00 GMT	Morias 79'; Crichlow (yellow card) 90+2'	Report	Mitchell (yellow card) 86'	Stadium: Victoria Road; Attendance: 1,569; Referee: Alan Dale

17 December 2024 21	Rochdale	3–0	Tamworth	Rochdale
19:45 GMT	Barlow (yellow card) 59'; Gilmour 73'; Gordon 80'; East (yellow card) 82'; Rodney 87'	Report	Cullinane-Liburd (red card) 59'; Tonks (yellow card) 68'; Crompton (yellow card) 70'	Stadium: Spotland Stadium; Attendance: 1,705; Referee: William Cavanagh

21 December 2024	Rochdale	P–P	Boston United	Rochdale
15:00 GMT				Stadium: Spotland Stadium
Note: Postponed due to a waterlogged pitch.

26 December 2024 22	Fylde	1–3	Rochdale	Wesham
15:00 GMT	Massey 5'; Mitchell (yellow card) 84'	Report	Mitchell 18', 64'; Gilmour 56'	Stadium: Mill Farm; Attendance: 2,292; Referee: Elliot Swallow

1 January 2025	Rochdale	P–P	Altrincham	Rochdale
15:00 GMT				Stadium: Spotland Stadium
Note: Postponed due to a waterlogged pitch.

11 January 2025	Tamworth	P–P	Rochdale	Tamworth
15:00 GMT				Stadium: The Lamb Ground
Note: Postponed due to Tamworth's FA Cup progression.

15 January 2025	Rochdale	P–P	York City	Rochdale
19:45 GMT				Stadium: Spotland Stadium
Note: Postponed due to planned pitch works.

18 January 2025 23	Forest Green Rovers	1–0	Rochdale	Nailsworth
15:00 GMT	McAllister (yellow card) 31'; Sercombe (yellow card) 51' (goal) 71'	Report	Okeke (yellow card) 29'	Stadium: The New Lawn; Attendance: 1,771; Referee: James Durkin

25 January 2025 24	Rochdale	4–0	Yeovil Town	Rochdale
15:00 GMT	Rodney 49'; Mitchell 57' (pen.); Ayinde 64'; Beckwith (yellow card) 90'; Burger 90+4'	Report	Cousin-Dawson (yellow card) 10'; Bernard (yellow card) 41'	Stadium: Spotland Stadium; Attendance: 2,463; Referee: Scott Oldham

28 January 2025	Rochdale	P–P	Boston United	Rochdale
19:45 GMT				Stadium: Spotland Stadium
Note: Postponed due to a waterlogged pitch.

1 February 2025	Woking	P–P	Rochdale	Woking
15:00 GMT				Stadium: Kingfield Stadium
Note: Postponed due to the progression of both teams in the FA Trophy.

4 February 2025 25	Rochdale	0–1	Oldham Athletic	Rochdale
19:45 GMT		Report	Fondop 17'; Kay (yellow card) 82'	Stadium: Spotland Stadium; Attendance: 5,880; Referee: Paul Marsden

8 February 2025 26	Rochdale	0–0	Ebbsfleet United	Rochdale
15:00 GMT		Report		Stadium: Spotland Stadium; Attendance: 2,134; Referee: Wayne Cartmel

15 February 2025 27	Southend United	1–1	Rochdale	Southend
15:00 GMT	Scott-Morriss (yellow card) 39'; Goodliffe (yellow card) 77'; Bonne (yellow card) 79'; Hogan 84' (o.g.)	Report	Beckwith (yellow card) 19'; Rodney 21'; Buyabu (yellow card) 71'; Adebayo-Rowling (yellow card) 79'	Stadium: Roots Hall; Attendance: 6,908; Referee: Declan Bourne

19 February 2025 28	FC Halifax Town	0–0	Rochdale	Halifax
19:45 GMT	Hoti (penalty missed) 83'	Report	Hogan (yellow card) 43'; East (yellow card) 84'	Stadium: The Shay; Attendance: 2,682; Referee: James Bancroft

22 February 2025 29	Rochdale	0–4	Barnet	Rochdale
15:00 GMT		Report	Stead 5'; Browne 41'; Telford 50'; Glover 85'	Stadium: Spotland Stadium; Attendance: 2,316; Referee: William Davis

25 February 2025 30	Tamworth	1–1	Rochdale	Tamworth
19:45 GMT	Tonks (yellow card) 38'; Waller 43' (o.g.); Singh (yellow card) 90'	Report	Mitchell 90+1'	Stadium: The Lamb Ground; Attendance: 805; Referee: Niall Smith

1 March 2025	Sutton United	P–P	Rochdale	Sutton
15:00 GMT				Stadium: Gander Green Lane
Note: Postponed due to Rochdale's progression in the FA Trophy.

4 March 2025 31	Rochdale	1–0	Gateshead	Rochdale
19:45 GMT	Allarakhia 82'	Report	Roles (yellow card) 57'	Stadium: Spotland Stadium; Attendance: 1,540; Referee: Dale Baines

8 March 2025 32	Rochdale	4–1	Wealdstone	Rochdale
15:00 GMT	Adebayo-Rowling 9'; Allarakhia (yellow card) 50' (goal) 58'; Henderson 54'; Barlow 83'	Report	Reid (yellow card) 45+1'; Kretzschmar (yellow card) 60'; Cook 75'	Stadium: Spotland Stadium; Attendance: 2,289; Referee: Scott Simpson

11 March 2025 33	Rochdale	3–0	Altrincham	Rochdale
19:45 GMT	Gilmour (yellow card) 45+1'; McBride (yellow card) 56'; Barlow 64'; Bird 67'; Mitchell 82'	Report	Marriott (yellow card) 69'; Cooper (yellow card) 80'	Stadium: Spotland Stadium; Attendance: 2,053; Referee: Stuart Morland

15 March 2025 34	Oldham Athletic	1–1	Rochdale	Oldham
12:30 GMT	Pett (yellow card) 31'; Conlon (yellow card) 34'; Yoganathan 85'	Report	Bird 5'	Stadium: Boundary Park; Attendance: 8,611; Referee: Alex Chilowicz

18 March 2025 35	Rochdale	2–3	Boston United	Rochdale
19:45 GMT	Beckwith (yellow card) 51'; Henderson 80'; Bird 88'	Report	Hazel 25'; Mills 28'; Green (yellow card) 45+1'; Richards (yellow card) 57'; Knowles 69'	Stadium: Spotland Stadium; Attendance: 1,974; Referee: Robert Massey-Ellis

22 March 2025 36	Maidenhead United	1–1	Rochdale	Maidenhead
15:00 GMT	Kiernan 50'; De Havilland (yellow card) 69'; Barratt (yellow card) 84'	Report	Henderson 16'; Mitchell (yellow card) 40'	Stadium: York Road; Attendance: 2,261; Referee: Michael Crusham

25 March 2025 37	Rochdale	0–4	York City	Rochdale
19:45 GMT	Hogan (yellow card) 64'	Report	Pearce 23', 69'; Sinclair (yellow card) 27'; Richardson 62'; Fallowfield 75'; Hunt (yellow card) 80'	Stadium: Spotland Stadium; Attendance: 2,707; Referee: Greg Rollason

29 March 2025 38	Rochdale	4–0	Aldershot Town	Rochdale
15:00 GMT	Beckwith 15'; Rodney 36', 54'; Henderson 56'	Report	Barrett (yellow card) 58'	Stadium: Spotland Stadium; Attendance: 2,270; Referee: Andrew Miller

1 April 2025 39	Woking	1–1	Rochdale	Woking
19:45 BST	Effiong (yellow card) 32'; Beautyman (yellow card) 61' (goal) 87' (pen.); Gorman (yellow card) 89'	Report	Rodney 27'; Mitchell (yellow card) 70'	Stadium: Kingfield Stadium; Attendance: 1,853; Referee: Richie Watkins

5 April 2025	Solihull Moors	P–P	Rochdale	Solihull
15:00 BST				Stadium: Damson Park
Note: Postponed due to Rochdale's progression in the FA Trophy.

8 April 2025 40	Sutton United	1–0	Rochdale	Sutton
19:45 BST	Gordon 87' (o.g.)	Report		Stadium: Gander Green Lane; Attendance: 2,087; Referee: Matthew Russell

12 April 2025 41	Rochdale	4–0	Eastleigh	Rochdale
15:00 BST	Rodney 11', 75' (yellow card) 90+1'; Fernandez 18' (o.g.); Henderson 63'	Report	Panter (yellow card) 29'; Boutin (yellow card) 62'	Stadium: Spotland Stadium; Attendance: 1,762; Referee: James Westgate

18 April 2025 42	Altrincham	1–2	Rochdale	Altrincham
15:00 BST	Wilson (yellow card) 27'; Marriott 58'; Kosylo (yellow card) 69'	Report	Beckwith 20' (yellow card) 45+3'; Rodney 89'; Kingdon (yellow card) 90+4'	Stadium: Moss Lane; Attendance: 3,464; Referee: Neil Hair

21 April 2025 43	Rochdale	0–0	Fylde	Rochdale
15:00 BST	Adebayo-Rowling (yellow card) 18'; Gilmour (yellow card) 90+1'	Report	Davis (yellow card) 11'; Jolley (yellow card) 87'	Stadium: Spotland Stadium; Attendance: 2,957; Referee: Niall Smith

26 April 2025 44	Rochdale	5–1	Hartlepool United	Rochdale
15:00 BST	Rodney 5' (pen.), 52'; Henderson 19'; Ayinde 23'; Ebanks-Landell (yellow card) 45+1'; Bird 85'	Report	Featherstone 11'	Stadium: Spotland Stadium; Attendance: 3,550; Referee: Jamie O'Connor

29 April 2025 45	Solihull Moors	0–1	Rochdale	Solihull
19:45 BST	Whitmore (yellow card) 41'; Osborne (yellow card) 80'	Report	Kingdon (yellow card) 35'; Henderson 53'; Mitchell (yellow card) 80'	Stadium: Damson Park; Attendance: 838; Referee: Melissa Burgin

5 May 2025 46	Braintree Town	2–0	Rochdale	Braintree
15:00 BST	Lisbie 45', 56'	Report		Stadium: Cressing Road; Attendance: 1,427; Referee: Robert Ellis

==== Play-offs ====
15 May 2025 QF	Rochdale	3–4 (a.e.t.)	Southend United	Rochdale
19:45 BST	Rodney 8', 56' (pen.); Bird 28'; Barlow (yellow card) 66'; Hogan (yellow card) 72'; Gordon (yellow card) 114'	Report	Ralph 22'; Hopper 74'; Chambers-Parillon 80' (yellow card) 114'; Kendall 101'; Scott-Morriss (yellow card) 117'	Stadium: Spotland Stadium; Attendance: 5,560; Referee: Andrew Humphries

=== FA Cup ===
12 October 2024 Q4	Fylde	1–4	Rochdale	Wesham
15:00 BST	Roberts 86'	Report	Mitchell 54', 76', 81'; Barlow 84'	Stadium: Mill Farm; Referee: Jamie O'Connor

2 November 2024 1	Rochdale	3–4	Bromley	Rochdale
15:00 GMT	Beckwith 24' (yellow card) 87'; Webster 52' (o.g.); Hogan (yellow card) 67'; Henderson 80'	Report	Whitely 1', 90+2'; Cheek 3'; Webster (yellow card) 49'; Imray (yellow card) 64' (yellow-red card) 90+3'; Amantchi 90+1'	Stadium: Spotland Stadium; Attendance: 2,329; Referee: Aaron Bannister

=== FA Trophy ===
7 December 2024 3	Leamington	P–P	Rochdale	Leamington Spa
15:00 GMT				Stadium: New Windmill Ground
Note: Postponed due to a waterlogged pitch.

10 December 2024 3	Leamington	0–2	Rochdale	Leamington Spa
19:45 GMT		Report	Adebayo-Rowling 41'; Dennis 84'	Stadium: New Windmill Ground; Attendance: 302; Referee: Wayne Cartmel

4 January 2025 4	Rochdale	P–P	Stockton Town	Rochdale
				Stadium: Spotland Stadium
Note: Postponed due to a waterlogged pitch

8 January 2025 4	Rochdale	0–0 (4–3 p)	Stockton Town	Stockton-on-Tees
19:45 GMT		Report		Stadium: Bishopton Road West; Attendance: 1,158; Referee: Paul Cooper
	Penalties
	East (penalty missed); Dennis (penalty missed); Barlow (penalty scored); Beckwith (penalty scored); Allarakhia (penalty scored); Buyabu (penalty scored)		Butterworth (penalty scored); Scott (penalty scored); Hayes (penalty scored); Fowler (penalty missed); Thompson (penalty missed); Harker (penalty missed)

1 February 2025 5	Worthing	1–2	Rochdale	Worthing
	Partington 75'	Report	Mitchell 7', 20'	Stadium: Woodside Road; Attendance: 2,230; Referee: Stephen Parkinson

1 March 2025 QF	Rochdale	2–0	Altrincham	Rochdale
	Bird 13'; Allarakhia 38'	Report		Stadium: Spotland Stadium; Attendance: 3,029; Referee: Zac Kennard-Kettle

5 April 2025 SF	Rochdale	2–2 (4–5 p)	Spennymoor Town	Rochdale
	Rodney 48'; Barlow 54' (pen.)	Report	Shrimpton 50'; Rutledge (yellow card) 78' (goal) 90+5'	Stadium: Spotland Stadium; Attendance: 5,527; Referee: Declan Bourne
	Penalties
	Beckwith (penalty scored); Barlow (penalty scored); Mitchell (penalty scored); Buyabu (penalty scored); Allarakhia (penalty missed)		Taylor (penalty scored); Simpson (penalty scored); Harris (penalty scored); Rutledge (penalty scored); Staunton (penalty scored)

=== National League Cup ===
Pos	Div	Team	Pld	W	PW	PL	L	GF	GA	GD	Pts	Qualification
1	ACA	Manchester United U21	4	4	0	0	0	13	2	+11	12	Advance to knockout stage
2	NL	Altrincham	4	2	1	0	1	9	9	0	8	Advance to knockout stage
3	NL	Rochdale	4	2	0	1	1	8	4	+4	7	
4	ACA	Wolverhampton Wanderers U21	4	1	2	0	1	7	6	+1	7	
5	NL	Oldham Athletic	4	2	0	1	1	7	10	−3	7	

Source: Premier League

5 November 2024 1	Rochdale	4–1	Blackburn Rovers U21	Rochdale
19:00 GMT	Dennis 18'; Buyabu (yellow card) 45+2'; Barlow 47', 55'; Ferguson (yellow card) 81'; Henderson 90+1'	Report	Litherland 41'; Murphy-Worrell (yellow card) 71'	Stadium: Spotland Stadium; Referee: Paul Cooper

3 December 2024 1	Rochdale	0–1	Manchester United U21	Rochdale
19:00 GMT	Allarakhia (yellow card) 22'; Senior (yellow card) 65'	Report	Jackson (yellow card) 36'; Wheatley (yellow card) 77'; Ibragimov 82'	Stadium: Spotland Stadium; Referee: John Mulligan

7 January 2025	Rochdale	P–P	Wolverhampton Wanderers U21	Rochdale
19:00 GMT				Stadium: Spotland Stadium
Note: Postponed due to planned pitch works.

21 January 2025 1	Rochdale	2–0	Stoke City U21	Rochdale
19:00 GMT	Ayinde 14'; Armstrong (yellow card) 30' (yellow-red card) 57'; Weston 47'	Report	Dixon (yellow card) 23'; Griffin (yellow card) 90+3'	Stadium: Spotland Stadium; Referee: Michael Crusham

11 February 2025 1	Rochdale	2–2 (1–4 p)	Wolverhampton Wanderers U21	Rochdale
19:00 GMT	Henderson 36', 67'; Edwards (yellow card) 66'	Report	Whittingham 2'; Hubner (yellow card) 89' (goal) 90+6'	Stadium: Spotland Stadium; Referee: Gareth Rhodes
	Penalties
	Allarakhia (penalty missed); Edwards (penalty missed); Weston (penalty scored)		Ángel (penalty scored); Whittingham (penalty scored); Lopes (penalty scored); Hubner (penalty scored)
