= Nathan Harker (disambiguation) =

Nathan Harker may refer to:-

- Nathan Harker (footballer) (born 1998), English footballer (Newcastle United, Stockton town), see 2024–25 Rochdale A.F.C. season
- Nathan Harker, fictional character from Hollyoaks
