= Jake Burger (disambiguation) =

Jake or Jacob Burger may refer to:-

- Jake Burger (b 1996), American professional baseball player
- Jake Burger (footballer) (b 2004), English footballer, see 2024–25 Rochdale A.F.C. season
