= Dajaune Brown =

Jamaican footballer (born 2005)

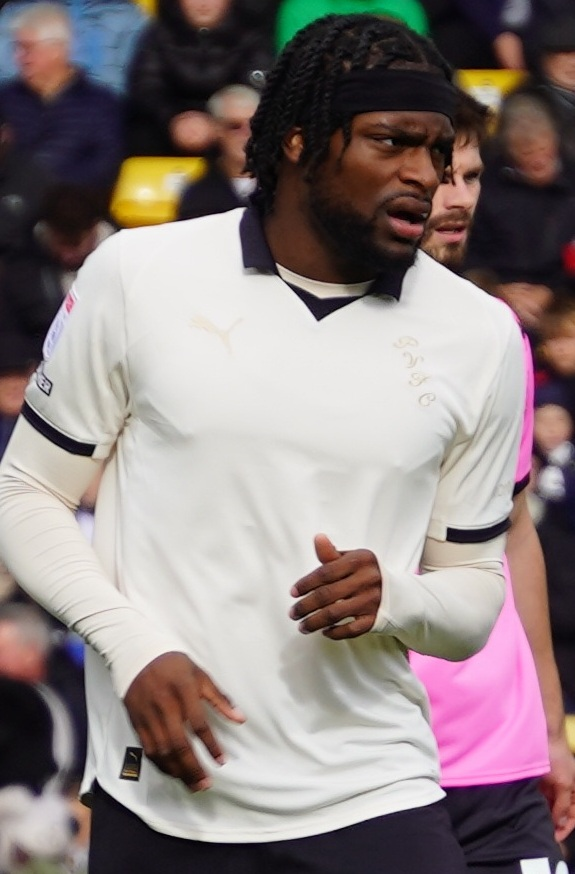
- Brown with Port Vale (2025)

Personal information
- Full name: Dajaune Anthony Brown
- Date of birth: 16 October 2005 (age 21)
- Place of birth: Nottingham, England
- Height: 6 ft 0 in (1.83 m)
- Position: Forward

Team information
- Current team: Rochdale (on loan from Derby County)
- Number: 39

Youth career
- 20??–2023: Derby County

Senior career*
Years	Team	Apps	(Gls)
2023–	Derby County	18	(1)
2024	→ Gateshead (loan)	18	(6)
2025–2026	→ Port Vale (loan)	24	(1)
2026–	→ Rochdale (loan)	8	(2)

International career^{‡}
2026–	Jamaica	2	(0)
- * Club domestic league appearances and goals as of 17:05, 26 September 2026 (UTC) ‡ National team caps and goals as of 10:43, 31 May 2026 (UTC)

Dajaune Anthony Brown (born 16 October 2005) is a professional footballer who plays as a forward for EFL League Two club Rochdale, on loan from EFL Championship club Derby County. Born in England, Brown plays for the Jamaica national team.

Brown came through the academy at Derby County to sign his first professional contract in July 2023, a month before making his first-team debut for the club. In January 2024, he joined Gateshead on loan, where he helped them win the FA Trophy. He joined Port Vale on loan for the 2025–26 season and Rochdale for the 2026–27 season.

== Club career ==
Brown came through Derby County's academy, making his debut for the under-18s as a schoolboy during the 2020–21 season. That season he scored twice in six Premier League U18 appearances. The 2022–23 season saw further progress with nine goals in nine appearances for the under-21s, and one goal in three Premier League 2 appearances. He also made his first appearance in the first-team squad as an unused substitute in Derby's fourth round FA Cup match against West Ham United in January 2023.

In July 2023, after training and playing with the first team in pre-season ahead of the 2023–24 season, Brown, aged 17, signed a three-year professional deal to run until the summer of 2026. He made his professional debut coming off the bench as a 73rd-minute substitute for Conor Washington against Blackpool in the EFL Cup on 8 August. He made his senior league debut for Derby as a 77th-minute substitute for Max Bird in a 4–0 win against Northampton Town in League One on 31 October 2023. Brown made five appearances for the first team during the season as they secured promotion to the Championship.

On 23 January 2024, Brown joined National League club Gateshead on a youth loan until the end of the 2023–24 season. He made his debut for Gateshead as a 77th-minute substitute for Conor McBride in a 2–1 win over Barnet on 27 January. He scored his first goal in senior football during this loan spell, scoring a 90th-minute equaliser in a 1–1 draw at Boreham Wood on 2 March. Three days later, he scored in a 3–2 defeat to Solihull Moors. Interim manager Rob Elliot called for patience from the Gateshead fans as he was yet to start a National League game for the club. On 9 March, Brown started in Gateshead's FA Trophy quarter-final match at home to Peterborough Sports. He scored his first career hat-trick, within 22 minutes, with the goals coming in a 15-minute period as Gateshead advanced to the semi-finals as 3–2 victors. Brown had now scored five goals in three appearances for Gateshead. On 12 March, he made his first league start and scored the only goal in a 1–0 win at home to Dagenham & Redbridge, in the 76th-minute, which extended his goalscoring run. He scored twice in a 7–1 win against local rivals Hartlepool United on 26 March, and assisted Gateshead's two goals in their 2–1 FA Trophy semi-final win against Macclesfield on 6 April, as they secured a place in the final at Wembley Stadium in May. He was named the National League Player of the Month for March.

He finished his loan spell with six goals in 18 National League games as Gateshead qualified for the National League play-offs. However, the club were denied entry as they had failed to secure the 10-year lease on Gateshead International Stadium required for membership of the Football League. He scored an equalising goal in extra time in the FA Trophy final against Solihull Moors on 11 May as the game ended in a 2–2 draw; Gateshead won the tie in a penalty shoot-out to win the Trophy, with Brown scoring the winning penalty in sudden death. Brown scored 10 times in 22 appearances in all competitions during his loan spell for Gateshead.

Ahead of the 2024–25 season, Brown took a full part in Derby's first team pre-season activities. Derby head coach Paul Warne said that he wanted to assess Brown in pre-season to see if he was ready to be part of the first-team squad in the Championship. He started Derby's EFL Cup first round tie against Chesterfield and his performance impressed Derby's coaching staff. At the end of the summer transfer window, there was speculation that Brown may be loaned out to a League One or League Two club with a reported 12 clubs in the two divisions interested in a loan for him, but Warne decided to keep him at Derby as they were unable to sign a new centre-forward of sufficient quality. He first appeared in the Championship in a 3–0 victory over Bristol City on 31 August. On 19 September, he signed a new contract at Derby, extending his stay until June 2027. On 26 October, he scored his first goal for Derby, a header, in a 1–1 draw with Hull City in the Championship. On 6 November, he made his first league start for Derby, playing 68 minutes of a 2–1 Championship away victory at Coventry City. On 14 January, Brown scored his first FA Cup goal, in a third round tie against Leyton Orient. His season ended early due to hamstring surgery following an injury sustained against Sunderland on 21 January, having scored twice in 18 appearances.

Brown returned from his injury in pre-season ahead of the 2025–26 season, making his return to first-team action in Derby's EFL Cup match against West Bromwich Albion on 12 August 2025. He made two further appearances for Derby from the substitute's bench in August, before joining League One club Port Vale on a season-long loan on 27 August. He scored three goals for the club in the 2025–26 season, which culminated in relegation.

On 6 August 2026, Brown joined League Two club Rochdale on a season-long loan. Head Coach Ian Watson said that he was "someone we've been chasing all summer and identified early on".

== International career ==
Born in England, Brown is of Jamaican descent. In March 2024, he was called up by the Jamaica under-23 team for a training camp and friendlies against RCD Espanyol Cantera and Guinea under-23s. In May 2026, Brown was called up to the senior Jamaica team for the 2026 Unity Cup. Brown made his debut for Jamaica on 27 May 2026 during the 2–0 victory against India at the Unity Cup semi-finals.

== Career statistics ==
=== Club ===
As of match played 26 September 2026

Appearances and goals by club, season and competition
Club	Season	League			FA Cup		EFL Cup		Other		Total	
Club	Season	Division	Apps	Goals	Apps	Goals	Apps	Goals	Apps	Goals	Apps	Goals
Derby County	2023–24	League One	2	0	0	0	1	0	2 (Note: Appearances in the EFL Trophy)	0	5	0
Derby County	2024–25	Championship	15	1	1	1	2	0	—		18	2
Derby County	2025–26	Championship	1	0	0	0	2	0	—		3	0
Derby County	2026–27	Championship	0	0	0	0	0	0	—		0	0
Derby County	Total		18	1	1	1	5	0	2	0	26	2
Gateshead (loan)	2023–24	National League	18	6	—		—		4 (Note: Appearances in the FA Trophy)	4	22	10
Port Vale (loan)	2025–26	League One	24	1	4	0	0	0	6	2	34	3
Rochdale (loan)	2026–27	League Two	8	2	0	0	1	0	0	0	9	2
Career total			68	10	5	1	6	0	12	6	91	17

=== International ===
As of match played 30 May 2026

Appearances and goals by national team and year
National team	Year	Apps	Goals
Jamaica	2026	2	0
Total		2	0

== Honours ==
Derby County

- EFL League One second-place promotion: 2023–24

Gateshead

- FA Trophy: 2023–24

Individual

- National League Player of the Month: March 2024
