= Kyle Ferguson =

Scottish footballer (born 1999)

Personal information
- Full name: Kyle Ferguson
- Date of birth: 24 September 1999 (age 27)
- Place of birth: Bellshill, Scotland
- Height: 6 ft 5 in (1.96 m)
- Position: Central defender

Team information
- Current team: Gateshead
- Number: 24

Youth career
- 2007–2014: Rangers
- Kilmarnock
- Airdrieonians

College career
| Years | Team | Apps | (Gls) |
| 2017–2020 | Medaille College | | |

Senior career*
| Years | Team | Apps | (Gls) |
| 2016–2017 | Clyde | 2 | (0) |
| 2020 | Ytterhogdal | | |
| 2021 | Waterford | 25 | (0) |
| 2022 | Altrincham | 9 | (0) |
| 2022–2023 | Harrogate Town | 4 | (0) |
| 2023 | → Altrincham (loan) | 10 | (0) |
| 2023–2025 | Rochdale | 25 | (0) |
| 2025 | → Yeovil Town (loan) | 4 | (0) |
| 2025–2026 | Yeovil Town | 34 | (2) |
| 2026– | Gateshead | 2 | (1) |
- * Club domestic league appearances and goals as of 17:45, 15 August 2026 (UTC)

Kyle Ferguson (born 24 September 1999) is a Scottish professional footballer who plays as a central defender for National League club Gateshead.

== Career ==
=== Early career ===
Born in Glasgow, Ferguson played youth football for Rangers, Kilmarnock, and Airdrieonians, before playing senior football with Clyde. He then played college soccer for Medaille College and in Sweden for Ytterhogdal, before signing for Irish club Waterford.

=== Harrogate Town ===
After playing with English club Altrincham, he signed for Harrogate Town in June 2022. In February 2023, he returned to Altrincham on a one month loan, a deal later extended until the end of the season.

=== Rochdale ===
On 23 June 2023, Ferguson joined Rochdale on a two-year contract. On 14 March 2025, Ferguson joined Yeovil Town on loan until the end of the 2024–25 season. On 12 April 2025 after making four appearances for Yeovil, Ferguson was recalled by Rochdale. He was released by Rochdale at the end of the season.

=== Yeovil Town ===
On 30 June 2025, Ferguson returned to Yeovil Town on a permanent basis ahead of the 2025–26 season signing a one-year deal. He was released by Yeovil Town at the end of the 2025–26 season.

=== Gateshead ===
On 30 July 2026, Ferguson signed for National League side Gateshead following a successful trial.

== Personal life ==
He is a member of a footballing family which includes his father Barry Ferguson, uncle Derek Ferguson and cousin Lewis Ferguson (who was once a teammate in the Rangers academy). He has also done some modelling work.

== Career statistics ==
As of match played 15 August 2026

Appearances and goals by club, season and competition
| Club | Season | League | | | National Cup (Note: Includes Scottish Cup, FAI Cup, FA Cup) | | League Cup (Note: Includes EFL Cup) | | Other | | Total | |
| Club | Season | Division | Apps | Goals | Apps | Goals | Apps | Goals | Apps | Goals | Apps | Goals |
|---|---|---|---|---|---|---|---|---|---|---|---|---|
| Clyde | 2016–17 | Scottish League Two | 0 | 0 | 1 | 0 | 0 | 0 | 1 (Note: Appearance in Scottish Challenge Cup) | 0 | 2 | 0 |
| Waterford | 2021 | League of Ireland; Premier Division | 25 | 0 | 3 | 0 | — | | 1 (Note: Appearance in League of Ireland promotion/relegation play-offs) | 0 | 29 | 0 |
| Altrincham | 2021–22 | National League | 9 | 0 | 0 | 0 | — | | 0 | 0 | 9 | 0 |
| Harrogate Town | 2022–23 | League Two | 4 | 0 | 0 | 0 | 1 | 0 | 3 (Note: Appearances in EFL Trophy) | 0 | 8 | 0 |
| Altrincham (loan) | 2022–23 | National League | 10 | 0 | 0 | 0 | — | | 0 | 0 | 10 | 0 |
| Rochdale | 2023–24 | National League | 10 | 0 | 1 | 0 | — | | 0 | 0 | 11 | 0 |
| Rochdale | 2024–25 | National League | 15 | 0 | 1 | 0 | — | | 5 (Note: One appearance in FA Trophy, four appearances in National League Cup) | 0 | 21 | 0 |
| Rochdale | Total | | 25 | 0 | 2 | 0 | — | | 5 | 0 | 32 | 0 |
| Yeovil Town (loan) | 2024–25 | National League | 4 | 0 | — | | — | | — | | 4 | 0 |
| Yeovil Town | 2025–26 | National League | 35 | 2 | 1 | 0 | — | | 3 (Note: Appearances in FA Trophy) | 0 | 39 | 2 |
| Gateshead | 2026–27 | National League | 2 | 1 | 0 | 0 | — | | 0 | 0 | 2 | 1 |
| Career total | | | 114 | 3 | 7 | 0 | 1 | 0 | 13 | 0 | 135 | 3 |
