= Zain Silcott-Duberry =

English footballer (born 2005)

Personal information
- Full name: Zain Rio Silcott-Duberry
- Date of birth: 9 July 2005 (age 21)
- Place of birth: Hackney, England
- Height: 1.77 m (5 ft 10 in)
- Position: Wide midfielder

Team information
- Current team: Rochdale
- Number: 11

Youth career
- –2017: Norwich City
- 2017–2025: Chelsea

Senior career*
Years	Team	Apps	(Gls)
2025	Bournemouth	1	(0)
2025–2026	Olympiacos B	11	(0)
2026	Sheffield Wednesday	0	(0)
2026–	Rochdale	10	(0)

International career
- Montserrat U15
2021	England U16	1	(0)
2022	England U17	1	(0)
- * Club domestic league appearances and goals as of 17:14, 21 November 2026 (UTC)

Zain Rio Silcott-Duberry (born 9 July 2005) is an English professional footballer who plays as a wide midfielder for EFL League Two club Rochdale.

== Career ==
Born in Hackney, Silcott-Duberry started his career at Norwich City, before joining Chelsea in 2017. He signed his first professional contract in August 2022.

On 17 January 2025, Silcott-Duberry joined Premier League club Bournemouth. On 25 January, he made his senior debut, coming on as a last-minute substitute in a 5–0 Premier League victory over Nottingham Forest.

On 10 September 2025, Silcott-Duberry signed for Super League Greece 2 club Olympiacos B.

On 25 February 2026, he returned to England, joining EFL Championship side Sheffield Wednesday on a free transfer until the end of the season. At the end of the 2025–26 season, it was confirmed that he would be leaving at the end of his contract.

On 28 July 2026, Silcott-Duberry signed an initial one-year contract with EFL League Two club Rochdale. He made his debut on 1 August in the EFL Cup preliminary round against Tranmere Rovers, where he scored a late equaliser to take the game to penalties, which Rochdale would eventually win.

== International career ==
Born in England and of Montserratian descent, Silcott-Duberry represented Montserrat at U-15 level. He has represented England at under-16 and under-17 level.

== Career statistics ==
=== Club ===
As of 21 November 2026

Appearances and goals by club, season and competition
Club	Season	League			National Cup (Note: Includes FA Cup)		League Cup (Note: Includes EFL Cup)		Other		Total	
Club	Season	Division	Apps	Goals	Apps	Goals	Apps	Goals	Apps	Goals	Apps	Goals
Chelsea U21	2023–24	—			—		—		2 (Note: Appearances in EFL Trophy)	0	2	0
Bournemouth	2024–25	Premier League	1	0	1	0	0	0	—		2	0
Olympiacos B	2025–26	Super League 2	11	0	0	0	0	0	—		11	0
Sheffield Wednesday	2025–26	EFL Championship	0	0	—		—		—		0	0
Rochdale	2026–27	EFL League Two	10	0	1	0	2	1	3	0	16	1
Career total			22	0	2	0	2	1	5	0	31	1
