= Sam Sherring =

English footballer (born 2000)

Personal information
- Full name: Sam Sherring
- Date of birth: 8 May 2000 (age 26)
- Place of birth: Dorchester, England
- Height: 1.88 m (6 ft 2 in)
- Position: Centre-back

Team information
- Current team: Rochdale
- Number: 26

Youth career
- 2007–2019: Bournemouth

Senior career*
Years	Team	Apps	(Gls)
2019–2022	Bournemouth	0	(0)
2018–2019	→ Weymouth (loan)	31	(0)
2019–2020	→ Weymouth (loan)	11	(0)
2020–2021	→ Torquay United (loan)	42	(3)
2021–2022	→ Accrington Stanley (loan)	10	(0)
2022	→ Cambridge United (loan)	14	(0)
2022–2024	Northampton Town	73	(2)
2024–2026	Milton Keynes Dons	10	(0)
2025–2026	→ Cheltenham Town (loan)	23	(2)
2026–	Rochdale	7	(0)
- * Club domestic league appearances and goals as of 21:57, 3 November 2026 (UTC)

Sam Sherring (born 8 May 2000) is an English professional footballer who plays as a centre-back for EFL League Two club Rochdale.

A graduate of AFC Bournemouth's academy, Sherring's previous clubs include Northampton Town, Cambridge United, Accrington Stanley, Torquay United and Weymouth.

== Career ==
=== Early career ===
Born in Dorchester, Sherring began his career with Bournemouth, in 2007, at the age of 7. After loan spells with Weymouth, and Torquay United, including an appearance in the National League Play-Off final, he moved on loan to Accrington Stanley in August 2021. On 11 January 2022, Sherring signed on loan for Cambridge United until the end of the season.

=== Northampton Town ===
Sherring moved to Northampton Town in July 2022.

=== Milton Keynes Dons ===
After rejecting a new contract from Northampton, it was announced in June 2024 that Sherring would join Milton Keynes Dons on 1 July 2024. He made his debut for the club on 10 August 2024, unfortunately scoring an own goal in a 1–2 home defeat to Bradford City.

On 31 August 2025, Sherring joined EFL League Two club Cheltenham Town on loan until the end of the 2025–26 season.

Sherring was one of nine players released by the club at the conclusion of their contracts on 30 June 2026.

=== Rochdale ===
On 27 July 2026 it was announced that Sherring had signed for Rochdale.

== Career statistics ==
As of match played 3 November 2026

Appearances and goals by club, season and competition
Club	Season	League			FA Cup		League Cup		Other		Total	
Club	Season	Division	Apps	Goals	Apps	Goals	Apps	Goals	Apps	Goals	Apps	Goals
Bournemouth	2019–20	Premier League	0	0	0	0	0	0	0	0	0	0
Bournemouth	2020–21	Championship	0	0	0	0	0	0	0	0	0	0
Bournemouth	2021–22	Championship	0	0	0	0	0	0	0	0	0	0
Bournemouth	Total		0	0	0	0	0	0	0	0	0	0
Weymouth (loan)	2018–19	Southern Premier South	31	0	2	0	0	0	5 (Note: Appearances in the FA Trophy.)	0	38	0
Weymouth (loan)	2019–20	National League North	11	0	0	0	0	0	2 (Note: Appearances in the FA Trophy.)	0	13	0
Torquay United (loan)	2020–21	National League	42	3	2	0	0	0	5 (Note: Three appearances in the FA Trophy; two appearances in the Play-Offs.)	0	49	3
Accrington Stanley (loan)	2021–22	League One	10	0	0	0	1	0	3 (Note: Appearances in the EFL Trophy.)	0	14	0
Cambridge United (loan)	2021–22	League One	14	0	1	0	0	0	0	0	15	0
Northampton Town	2022–23	League Two	36	2	1	0	0	0	0	0	37	2
Northampton Town	2023–24	League One	37	0	1	0	1	0	1	0	40	0
Northampton Town	Total		73	2	2	0	1	0	1	0	77	2
Milton Keynes Dons	2024–25	League Two	10	0	1	0	1	0	1	0	13	0
Milton Keynes Dons	2025–26	League Two	0	0	0	0	0	0	0	0	0	0
Milton Keynes Dons	Total		10	0	1	0	1	0	1	0	13	0
Cheltenham Town (loan)	2025–26	League Two	23	2	1	0	0	0	1	0	25	2
Rochdale	2026–27	League Two	7	0	0	0	2	0	3	0	12	0
Career total			221	7	9	0	5	0	21	0	256	7

== Honours ==
Northampton Town

- EFL League Two promotion: 2022–23
