= Nils Ramming =

Swedish footballer (born 2007)

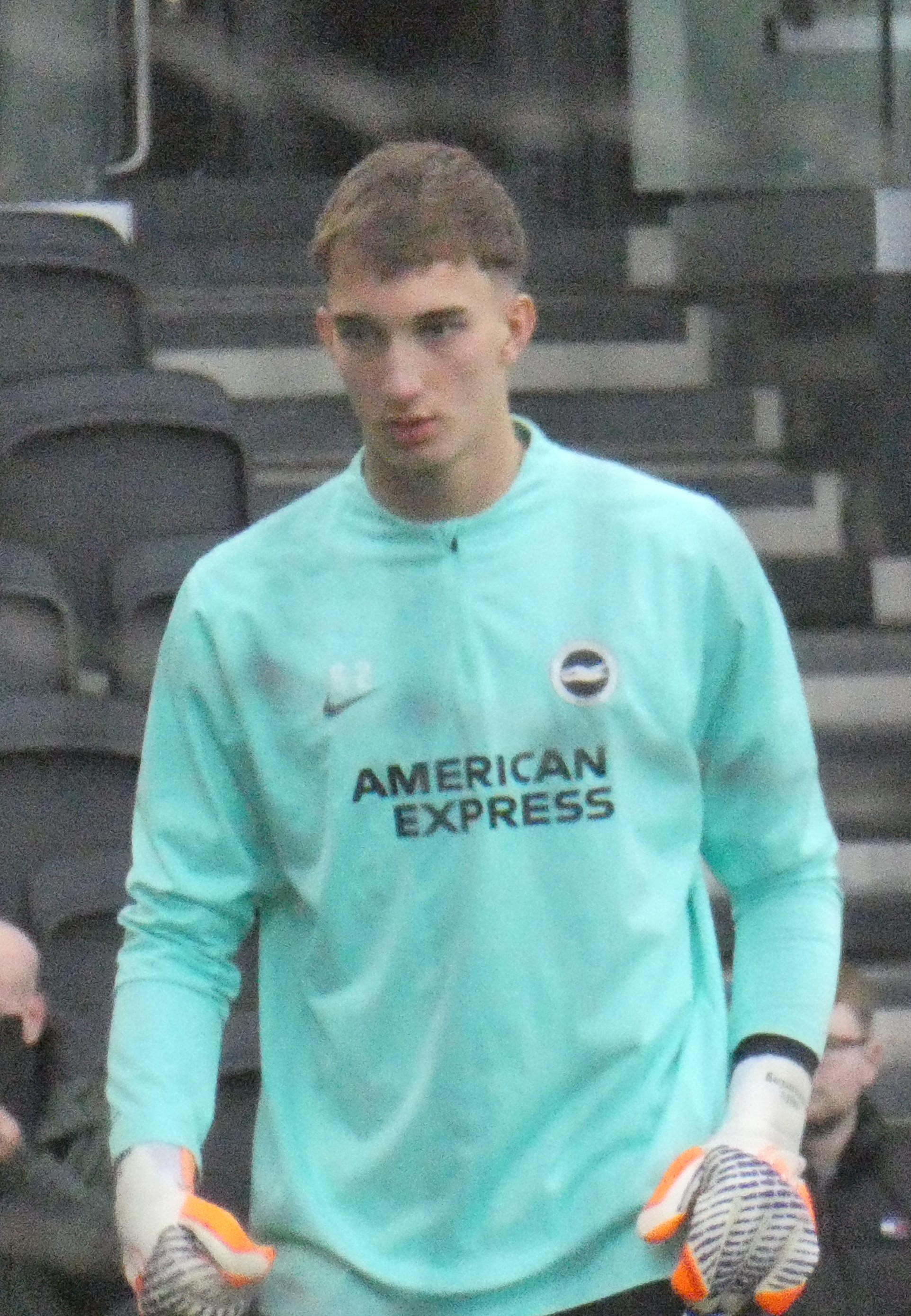
- Ramming with Brighton & Hove Albion in 2026

Personal information
- Full name: Nils Arvid Eistrand Ramming
- Date of birth: 28 March 2007 (age 19)
- Place of birth: Westminster, England
- Height: 1.94 m (6 ft 4 in)
- Position: Goalkeeper

Team information
- Current team: Rochdale (on loan from Brighton & Hove Albion)
- Number: 1

Youth career
- Primrose Hill Soccer Academy
- –2017: Leyton Orient
- 2017–2019: Hessen Dreieich
- 2019–2024: Eintracht Frankfurt
- 2025–2026: Brighton & Hove Albion

Senior career*
Years	Team	Apps	(Gls)
2024–2025	Eintracht Frankfurt II	26	(0)
2024–2025	Eintracht Frankfurt	0	(0)
2025–	Brighton & Hove Albion	0	(0)
2026–	→ Rochdale (loan)	8	(0)

International career^{‡}
2024	Sweden U17	5	(0)
2024–2025	Sweden U19	9	(0)
- * Club domestic league appearances and goals as of 3 October 2026 ‡ National team caps and goals as of 4 July 2026 (UTC)

Nils Arvid Eistrand Ramming (born 28 March 2007) is a footballer who plays as a goalkeeper for EFL League Two club Rochdale, on loan from the academy of Premier League club Brighton & Hove Albion. Born in England, he is a Sweden youth international.

== Early life ==
Ramming was born on 28 March 2007 in London, England. Born to a German father and a Swedish mother, he has a younger brother. At the age of ten, he moved with his family to Germany because of his father's occupation.

Growing up, he played rugby and cricket and supported German Bundesliga side Eintracht Frankfurt and regarded Germany international Kevin Trapp as one of his football idols.

== Club career ==
=== Early career ===
As a youth player, Ramming joined the English side Primrose Hill Soccer Academy. Subsequently, he joined the youth academy of English side Leyton Orient. In 2017, he joined the youth academy of German side Hessen Dreieich.

Two years later, he joined the youth academy of German Bundesliga side Eintracht Frankfurt at the age of twelve and was promoted to the club's under-17 team ahead of the 2023–24 season. In 2024, he was promoted to their under-19 team and reserve team , where he received interest from Portuguese side Sporting CP. On 27 July 2024, he debuted for the reserve team during a 1–2 away loss to Stuttgarter Kickers in the league.

=== Brighton & Hove Albion ===
On 29 June 2025, Ramming joined Premier League side Brighton & Hove Albion on a five-year deal, initially joining the club's academy.

On 17 July 2026, Ramming joined newly promoted League Two club Rochdale on a season-long loan deal. He made his debut for the club on 1 August 2026, in a 2–2 draw with Tranmere Rovers which Rochdale won on penalties in the EFL Cup.

== International career ==
Ramming is a Sweden youth international. During the summer of 2024, he played for the Sweden national under-17 team at the UEFA Euro 2024. Two years later, he was called up to the Sweden national under-21 football team.

== Career statistics ==
As of match played 3 October 2026

Appearances and goals by club, season and competition
Club	Season	League			FA Cup		EFL Cup		Other		Total	
Club	Season	Division	Apps	Goals	Apps	Goals	Apps	Goals	Apps	Goals	Apps	Goals
Brighton & Hove Albion U21s	2025–26	—							2 (Note: Appearances in EFL Trophy)	0	2	0
Brighton & Hove Albion	2026–27	Premier League	0	0	0	0	0	0	—		0	0
Rochdale (loan)	2026–27	League Two	8	0	0	0	2	0	0	0	10	0
Career total			8	0	0	0	2	0	2	0	12	0

== Honours ==
Brighton & Hove Albion U21

- Professional Development League: 2025–26
