= Dan Moss =

English footballer (born 2000)

Personal information
- Full name: Daniel Thomas Moss
- Date of birth: 4 November 2000 (age 25)
- Place of birth: Worcestershire, England
- Height: 5 ft 11 in (1.80 m)
- Position: Defender

Team information
- Current team: Rochdale
- Number: 22

Youth career
- –2018: Burnley

Senior career*
Years	Team	Apps	(Gls)
2018–2019	Burnley	0	(0)
2019	→ Lancaster City (loan)	5	(0)
2019–2022	Millwall	0	(0)
2021–2022	→ Yeovil Town (loan)	20	(0)
2022	→ Leyton Orient (loan)	4	(0)
2022–2025	Woking	110	(3)
2025–	Rochdale	44	(3)
- * Club domestic league appearances and goals as of 13:00, 19 September 2026 (UTC)

Daniel Thomas Moss (born 4 November 2000) is an English professional footballer who plays as a defender for EFL League Two club Rochdale.

== Career ==
Moss began his career with Burnley and signed a two-year scholarship with the club in the summer of 2017. In March 2019, it was announced that he would not be offered a professional deal or scholarship extension and he subsequently joined Northern Premier League Premier Division side Lancaster City on a work experience loan. He joined Millwall in 2019, where he was captain of the under-23 team before moving on loan to Yeovil Town in August 2021. He returned from his loan in January 2022, before moving to Leyton Orient on loan later that month.

On 23 May 2022, Moss agreed to join National League club Woking on a free transfer, signing a two-year deal upon the expiration of his Millwall contract.

He scored his first ever professional goal on his 110th appearance for the club in a 1–1 draw with York City.

On 12 June 2025, it was announced that Moss would be leaving the club following the expiry of his contract.

The following day he completed a move to fellow National League side Rochdale on a one-year contract.

== Career statistics ==
As of match played 19 September 2026

Appearances and goals by club, season and competition
Club	Season	League			FA Cup		EFL Cup		Other		Total	
Club	Season	Division	Apps	Goals	Apps	Goals	Apps	Goals	Apps	Goals	Apps	Goals
Burnley	2018–19	Premier League	0	0	0	0	0	0	0	0	0	0
Lancaster City (loan)	2018–19	Northern Premier League Premier Division	5	0	—		—		—		5	0
Millwall	2019–20	Championship	0	0	0	0	0	0	—		0	0
Millwall	2020–21	Championship	0	0	0	0	0	0	—		0	0
Millwall	2021–22	Championship	0	0	0	0	0	0	—		0	0
Millwall	Total		0	0	0	0	0	0	—		0	0
Yeovil Town (loan)	2021–22	National League	20	0	5	0	—		1 (Note: Appearance(s) in FA Trophy)	0	26	0
Leyton Orient (loan)	2021–22	League Two	4	0	—		—		—		4	0
Woking	2022–23	National League	44	0	2	0	—		2 (Note: One appearance in FA Trophy, one appearance in National League play-offs)	0	48	0
Woking	2023–24	National League	39	0	3	0	—		1	0	43	0
Woking	2024–25	National League	27	3	2	0	—		2	0	31	3
Woking	Total		110	3	7	0	0	0	5	0	122	3
Rochdale	2025–26	National League	38	2	0	0	—		1 (Note: Appearance in the play-offs)	0	39	2
Rochdale	2026–27	League Two	6	1	0	0	2	0	0	0	8	1
Rochdale	Total		44	3	0	0	2	0	1	0	47	3
Career total			184	6	12	0	2	0	7	0	205	6
