= Charlie Tasker =

English footballer

Personal information
- Full name: Charlie Kian Tasker
- Date of birth: 24 February 2006 (age 20)
- Place of birth: Brighton and Hove, England
- Height: 1.85 m (6 ft 1 in)
- Position: Right-back

Team information
- Current team: Rochdale (on loan from Brighton & Hove Albion)
- Number: 2

Youth career
- 2012–2026: Brighton & Hove Albion

Senior career*
Years	Team	Apps	(Gls)
2025–	Brighton & Hove Albion	0	(0)
2026–	→ Rochdale (loan)	10	(2)
- * Club domestic league appearances and goals as of 31 October 2026

Charlie Kian Tasker (born 24 February 2006) is an English professional footballer who plays as a defender for EFL League Two club Rochdale, on loan from the academy of Premier League club Brighton & Hove Albion.

== Club career ==
=== Brighton & Hove Albion ===
A youth product of the Brighton & Hove Albion academy since the age of 6, Tasker signed a youth contract with the club on 7 July 2024. He was promoted to their U21s in the 2024–25 season, and started training with their senior team in the second half of the season. On 4 June 2025, he signed a professional contract with the club. He made his senior and professional debut with Brighton & Hove Albion as a substitute in a 6–0 EFL Cup win over Oxford United on 27 August 2025.

==== Loan to Rochdale ====
On 1 September 2026, Tasker was loaned to EFL League Two side Rochdale until the end of the season. On 5 September 2026, Tasker scored on his debut in the 1–4 defeat to Gillingham.

== Career statistics ==
=== Club ===
As of match played 7 November 2026

Appearances and goals by club, season and competition
Club	Season	League			FA Cup		EFL Cup		Other		Total	
Club	Season	Division	Apps	Goals	Apps	Goals	Apps	Goals	Apps	Goals	Apps	Goals
Brighton & Hove Albion U21s	2023–24	—							1 (Note: Appearance(s) in EFL Trophy)	0	1	0
Brighton & Hove Albion U21s	2024–25	—							3	0	3	0
Brighton & Hove Albion U21s	2025–26	—							1	0	1	0
Brighton & Hove Albion U21s	2026–27	—							1	1	1	1
Brighton & Hove Albion U21s	Total	—							6	1	6	1
Brighton & Hove Albion	2025–26	Premier League	0	0	0	0	2	0	—		2	0
Rochdale (On Loan)	2026–27	League Two	10	2	1	0	0	0	1	0	12	2
Career total			10	2	1	0	2	0	7	1	20	3
