= Samuel Gardner Waller =

American politician

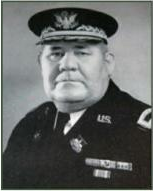
Maj. Gen. S. Gardner Waller

Samuel Gardner Waller (1882-1955) was a United States Army brigadier general and the Adjutant General of Virginia. He was responsible for overseeing the Virginia Army National Guard and the Virginia Air National Guard. He was born March 26, 1882, to Nelson and Rebecca Waller of Front Royal, Virginia. He married Ms. Anna Louise Ford, also of Front Royal, in 1903. He died December 2, 1955, at the age of 74 and was buried at the Prospect Hill Cemetery in Front Royal, Virginia.

== Education ==
Waller attended Front Royal High School, Randolph-Macon Academy from 1892 to 1894 and the Locust Dale Academy from 1895 to 1897 before graduating from the University of Virginia with a law degree in 1902. While at the University of Virginia he played baseball.

== Military career ==
After graduation from the University of Virginia, Waller joined Company D, 2nd Virginia Volunteer Infantry as a sergeant in April 1903. Soon after, he was commissioned as a second lieutenant in Company D, 2nd Virginia Regiment, also known as the Warren Light Infantry. He also served as aide-de-camp on the staff of General C. C. Vaughn, commander of 1st Virginia Brigade, where he was later selected to and served as the commander of Company D, 2nd Virginia Regiment, during operations against Pancho Villa on the U.S.-Mexico border in 1916. He spent 1917 on Federal service and was responsible for guarding bridges, trestles and tunnels in Southwest Virginia. During World War 1 he was promoted to the rank of major and commanded the 2nd Regiment, 116th Infantry, 29th Division, which he led in combat during the Meuse Argonne Offensive. In 1919, Waller returned home after earning the rank of lieutenant colonel.

On September 9, 1921, Waller was promoted to the rank of brigadier general and placed in command of the 91st Infantry Brigade (redesignated 88th Infantry Brigade). Following the retirement of Maj. Gen. William W. Sale, Waller was appointed as the Adjutant General of Virginia on July 1, 1931, by Governor John Garland Pollard and subsequently reappointed by Governors James Hubert Price, Colgate Darden, William M. Tuck, John S. Battle and Thomas B. Stanley. In 1948, Waller was promoted to Major General (Va.). On December 2, 1955, Waller died.

== Legal and political career ==
Following graduation from the University of Virginia Law School in 1903, Waller established his own law practice in Front Royal. In 1906, Waller was elected as the mayor of Front Royal and was reelected in 1908, 1910 and 1912. As an attorney, Waller served as the U.S. referee in bankruptcy for the western district of Virginia in 1919 and in 1919 he served as a U.S. Commissioner. In 1924, Waller was elected to the Virginia House of Delegates as the representative of Page and Warren Counties. He continued to serve as delegate until 1927.

== Legacy ==
S. Gardner Waller Depot, a Virginia Army National Guard armory in Richmond, Virginia, is named in honor of Waller.

== Awards and decorations ==
- Haute-Alsace Medal
- Meuse-Argonne Verdun Medal
- Commander, Crown of Italy
- Commander, Order of King Haakon of Norway
- Virginia National Guard Distinguished Service Medal
- National Guard Association of the United States' Distinguished Service Medal
