= Tarryn Allarakhia =

Tanzanian footballer (born 1997)

Personal information
- Full name: Tarryn Allarakhia
- Date of birth: 17 October 1997 (age 29)
- Place of birth: Redbridge, England
- Height: 1.83 m (6 ft 0 in)
- Positions: Midfielder; winger

Team information
- Current team: Boreham Wood
- Number: 11

Youth career
- Leyton Orient
- –2015: Aveley

Senior career*
Years	Team	Apps	(Gls)
2015–2016	Aveley	9	(1)
2016–2017	Maldon & Tiptree	42	(6)
2017–2018	Colchester United	0	(0)
2018–2021	Crawley Town	41	(0)
2019	→ Wealdstone (loan)	18	(4)
2021–2022	Woking	20	(0)
2022–2024	Wealdstone	76	(11)
2024–2026	Rochdale	72	(6)
2026–	Boreham Wood	0	(0)

International career^{‡}
2024–	Tanzania	12	(2)
- * Club domestic league appearances and goals as of 2 July 2026 ‡ National team caps and goals as of 29 March 2026

Tarryn Allarakhia (born 17 October 1997) is a professional footballer who plays as a midfielder or a winger for National League club Boreham Wood. Born in England, he plays for the Tanzania national team.

== Career ==
=== Early career ===
Born in Redbridge, London, Allarakhia is a former player in Leyton Orient's Academy. He trained with Bournemouth during the summer of 2015 and also had a one week trial at Norwich City. He was signed to Aveley's first-team from their youth system in 2015 where he played as a winger. He made eight league appearances for Aveley between October and December and scored one goal, and also made one appearance in the Essex Senior Cup.

=== Maldon & Tiptree ===
In January 2016, Allarakhia became Steve Ball's first signing as manager of Maldon & Tiptree. He scored one goal in 18 appearances during the second-half of the 2015–16 season, and scored a further four goals in 37 appearances during his first full season with the Jammers. During his first few months at the club, through Maldon & Tiptree's link-up with Colchester United, Allarakhia made appearances for the Colchester under-21 team.

=== Colchester United ===
In July 2017, Allarakhia signed a one year development contract with Colchester United. He was released by the club at the end of the season.

=== Crawley Town ===
On 1 August 2018, Crawley Town signed Allarakhia on a two-year contract. He made his professional debut on 14 August in Crawley's EFL Cup match against Bristol Rovers. Allarakhia was loaned out for 28 days to Wealdstone on 8 January 2019. The loan was later extended to the end of the season, during which he made 18 appearances, scoring 4 times as Wealdstone reached the semi-finals of the playoffs. Following this, he spent a further two seasons at Crawley Town, before being released in summer 2021.

=== Woking ===
On 19 August 2021, Allarakhia joined National League side, Woking on a one-year deal following a short-term trial period. He went onto feature twenty-two times for The Cards before leaving in July 2022 at the end of his contract.

=== Wealdstone ===
On 27 June 2022, Allarakhia rejoined Wealdstone following his departure from Woking. Allarakhia scored his first goal back at the club on 16 August 2022, scoring the second goal in a 2–1 win away at Oldham Athletic. He went on to score a total of 13 goals in 81 appearances over two full seasons at the club, during which he also became the first ever Wealdstone player to make an appearance at the Africa Cup of Nations.

In June 2024, it was announced that Allarakhia had left the club after failing to agree a new contract.

=== Rochdale ===
On 10 June 2024, Allarakhia signed for Rochdale on a two-year deal. On 18 May 2026, the club announced it was releasing him.

=== Boreham Wood ===
On 1 July 2026, Allarakhia returned to the National League following Rochdale's promotion, joining Boreham Wood.

== International career ==
Allarakhia was born to an Indo-Tanzanian father and English mother, and is thus eligible to represent Tanzania. Allarakhia was named as part of the 25 man squad for the Tanzania national team for the 2023 Africa Cup of Nations, and made his senior international debut against Egypt on 7 January 2024. He played in the 2023 AFCON match against Morocco. Following the tournament, he remained part of the Tanzania set-up, and scored his first international goal in a 4–3 defeat against Kuwait in November 2025.

Allarakhia was included in Tanzania's squad for the 2025 Africa Cup of Nations, and appeared in all four games at the tournament, as Tanzania progressed to the knockout stage for the first time in their history.

== Career statistics ==
=== Club ===
As of end of 2025–26 season

Appearances and goals by club, season and competition
Club	Season	League			FA Cup		League Cup		Other		Total	
Club	Season	Division	Apps	Goals	Apps	Goals	Apps	Goals	Apps	Goals	Apps	Goals
Aveley	2015–16	Isthmian League Division One North	9	1	0	0	—		0	0	9	1
Maldon & Tiptree	2015–16	Isthmian League Division One North	13	2	—		—		—		13	2
Maldon & Tiptree	2016–17	Isthmian League Division One North	29	4	2	0	—		3 (Note: One appearance in the Alan Turvey Trophy, one in the FA Trophy, one in the Isthmian League Division One North play-offs)	0	34	4
Maldon & Tiptree	Total		42	6	2	0	—		3	0	47	6
Colchester United	2017–18	League Two	0	0	0	0	0	0	0	0	0	0
Crawley Town	2018–19	League Two	5	0	0	0	1	0	3 (Note: Appearances in the EFL Trophy)	0	9	0
Crawley Town	2019–20	League Two	19	0	0	0	3	0	2	0	24	0
Crawley Town	2020–21	League Two	17	0	1	0	0	0	2	0	20	0
Crawley Town	Total		41	0	1	0	4	0	7	0	53	0
Wealdstone (loan)	2018–19	National League South	18	4	—		—		0	0	18	4
Woking	2021–22	National League	20	0	1	0	—		1 (Note: Appearance(s) in the FA Trophy)	0	22	0
Wealdstone	2022–23	National League	38	5	1	0	—		1	0	40	5
Wealdstone	2023–24	National League	38	6	1	0	—		2	2	41	8
Wealdstone	Total		76	11	2	0	0	0	3	2	81	13
Rochdale	2024–25	National League	42	4	2	0	—		8 (Note: Four appearances and one goal in FA Trophy, three appearances in National League Cup, one appearance in National League play-offs)	1	52	5
Rochdale	2025–26	National League	30	2	0	0	—		5 (Note: Two appearances in FA Trophy, three appearances in National League Cup)	0	35	2
Rochdale	Total		72	6	2	0	0	0	13	1	87	7
Career total			278	28	8	0	4	0	27	3	317	31

=== International ===
As of match played 29 March 2026

Appearances and goals by national team and year
National team	Year	Apps	Goals
Tanzania	2024	3	0
Tanzania	2025	6	1
Tanzania	2026	3	1
Total		12	2

=== International goals ===
No.	Date	Venue	Opponent	Score	Result	Competition
1	15 November 2025	Cairo International Stadium, Cairo, Egypt	Kuwait	2–0	3–4	Friendly
2	29 March 2026	Kigali Pelé Stadium, Kigali, Rwanda	Macau	6–0	6–0	2026 FIFA Series

== Honours ==
Rochdale

- National League play-offs: 2026
