= Harvey Gilmour =

English footballer (born 1998)

Personal information
- Full name: Harvey James Gilmour
- Date of birth: 15 December 1998 (age 27)
- Place of birth: Sheffield, England
- Height: 5 ft 11 in (1.80 m)
- Position: Midfielder

Team information
- Current team: Rochdale
- Number: 8

Senior career*
Years	Team	Apps	(Gls)
2018–2019	Sheffield United	0	(0)
2018–2019	→ Tranmere Rovers (loan)	14	(3)
2019–2020	Tranmere Rovers	12	(0)
2020–2021	Stockport County	3	(0)
2021–2023	FC Halifax Town	76	(2)
2023–	Rochdale	134	(6)
- * Club domestic league appearances and goals as of 21:45, 14 November 2026 (UTC)

Harvey James Gilmour (born 15 December 1998) is an English professional footballer who plays as a midfielder for EFL League Two club Rochdale.

== Career ==
Gilmour began his career with Sheffield United, moving on loan to Tranmere Rovers in July 2018. He made his English Football League debut on 11 August 2018. After scoring 3 goals in 23 appearances, the loan deal was made permanent in January 2019. He was released by the club at the end of the 2019–20 season. He joined Stockport County on a short-term contract on 22 August 2020. In July 2021, he moved to FC Halifax Town. In June 2023 he signed for Rochdale.

== Personal life ==
He went to Meadowhead Secondary School in Sheffield from 2010 to 2015.

== Career statistics ==
As of match played 14 November 2026

Appearances and goals by club, season and competition
Club	Season	League			FA Cup		EFL Cup		Other		Total	
Club	Season	Division	Apps	Goals	Apps	Goals	Apps	Goals	Apps	Goals	Apps	Goals
Sheffield United	2018–19	Championship	0	0	0	0	0	0	—		0	0
Tranmere Rovers (loan)	2018–19	League Two	14	3	5	0	1	0	3 (Note: Appearance(s) in EFL Trophy)	0	23	3
Tranmere Rovers	2018–19	League Two	8	0	—		—		2 (Note: Appearance(s) in League Two play-offs)	0	10	0
Tranmere Rovers	2019–20	League One	4	0	2	0	0	0	2	1	8	1
Tranmere Rovers	Total		12	0	2	0	0	0	4	1	18	1
Stockport County	2020–21	National League	3	0	0	0	—		0	0	3	0
FC Halifax Town	2021–22	National League	32	0	1	0	—		1 (Note: Appearance(s) in National League play-offs)	0	34	0
FC Halifax Town	2022–23	National League	43	2	1	0	—		2 (Note: Appearance(s) in FA Trophy)	1	46	3
FC Halifax Town	Total		75	2	2	0	0	0	3	1	80	3
Rochdale	2023–24	National League	44	1	0	0	—		0	0	44	1
Rochdale	2024–25	National League	37	2	0	0	—		1	0	38	2
Rochdale	2025–26	National League	38	3	0	0	—		2 (Note: Appearances in the play-offs)	0	40	3
Rochdale	2026–27	League Two	15	0	1	0	2	0	1	0	19	0
Rochdale	Total		134	6	1	0	2	0	4	0	141	6
Career total			238	11	10	0	3	0	14	2	265	13

== Honours ==
Tranmere Rovers

- EFL League Two play-offs: 2019

FC Halifax Town

- FA Trophy: 2022–23

Rochdale

- National League play-offs: 2026
