= Sam Waller =

English footballer (born 2003)

Personal information
- Full name: Sam William John Waller
- Date of birth: 9 September 2003 (age 23)
- Place of birth: Stockport, England
- Height: 1.87 m (6 ft 2 in)
- Position: Goalkeeper

Team information
- Current team: Rochdale
- Number: 20

Youth career
- Burnley

Senior career*
Years	Team	Apps	(Gls)
2022–2026	Burnley	0	(0)
2022–2023	→ Lancaster City (loan)	32	(0)
2023–2024	→ Hyde United (loan)	16	(0)
2024–2025	→ Rochdale (loan)	20	(0)
2025–2026	→ Crewe Alexandra (loan)	5	(0)
2026	Harrogate Town	1	(0)
2026–	Rochdale	7	(0)
- * Club domestic league appearances and goals as of 14:21, 22 November 2026 (UTC)

Sam William John Waller (born 9 September 2003) is an English professional footballer who plays as a goalkeeper for EFL League Two club Rochdale.

== Career ==
Born in Stockport, Waller began his career at Burnley. He moved on loan to Lancaster City in October 2022, with the loan later being extended until January 2023, before being extended to the end of the season. He made thirty-two league appearances for Lancaster City before returning to Burnley. On 1 September 2023, he returned to the Northern Premier League Premier Division on loan, joining Hyde United until January 2024.

In October 2024 he signed a new two-year contract with Burnley. He signed on loan for Rochdale in November 2024, with the loan being extended in January 2025 until the end of the season.

He moved on loan to Crewe Alexandra in July 2025. He replaced Tom Booth as first-choice goalkeeper halfway through the season, and was told by Crewe manager Lee Bell to take his chance in the team. He returned to Burnley in January 2026.

In February 2026, he signed for Harrogate Town on a permanent deal until the end of the season. On 15 May 2026 Harrogate announced he was being released.

In July 2026 he signed for Rochdale.

== Career statistics ==
As of match played 21 November 2026

Appearances and goals by club, season and competition
Club	Season	League			FA Cup		League Cup		Other		Total	
Club	Season	Division	Apps	Goals	Apps	Goals	Apps	Goals	Apps	Goals	Apps	Goals
Burnley	2022–23	Championship	0	0	0	0	0	0	—		0	0
Burnley	2023–24	Premier League	0	0	0	0	0	0	—		0	0
Burnley	2024–25	Championship	0	0	0	0	0	0	—		0	0
Burnley	2025–26	Premier League	0	0	0	0	0	0	—		0	0
Burnley	Total		0	0	0	0	0	0	0	0	0	0
Lancaster City (loan)	2022–23	Northern Premier League Premier Division	32	0	0	0	—		3 (Note: Appearance(s) in FA Trophy)	0	35	0
Hyde United (loan)	2023–24	Northern Premier League Premier Division	16	0	3	0	—		5 (Note: Two appearances in FA Trophy, one appearance in Manchester Premier Cup, two appearances in Cheshire Senior Cup)	0	24	0
Rochdale (loan)	2024–25	National League	20	0	0	0	—		0	0	20	0
Crewe Alexandra (loan)	2025–26	League Two	5	0	1	0	1	0	4 (Note: Appearance(s) in EFL Trophy)	0	11	0
Harrogate Town	2025–26	League Two	1	0	0	0	0	0	0	0	1	0
Rochdale	2026–27	League Two	7	0	1	0	0	0	3	0	11	0
Career total			81	0	5	0	1	0	15	0	102	0
