= Ian Watson (football coach) =

English football coach (born 1985)

Personal information
- Full name: Ian Watson
- Date of birth: 30 December 1985 (age 40)
- Place of birth: England
- Position: Left-back

Senior career*
Years	Team	Apps	(Gls)
- Whitley Bay
2013–2014	Blyth Spartans		
2014–2015	Darlington 1883		
2015–2017	Spennymoor Town		
2017–2019	Blyth Spartans		

Managerial career
- 2025–2026: South Shields
- 2026: Rochdale
- * Club domestic league appearances and goals

Ian Watson (born 30 December 1985) is an English football manager who most recently the head coach of League Two club Rochdale.

== Club career ==
On 26 May 2017, Watson returned to Blyth Spartans for a second-spell. He left the club and announced his retirement as a player in January 2019, in order to take up a coaching role at Gateshead.

== Coaching career ==
Watson joined the coaching staff at Gateshead in January 2019.

On 17 October 2023, Watson was appointed assistant head coach at Milton Keynes Dons, joining head coach Mike Williamson whom he worked with at Gateshead. On 19 September 2024, Watson was appointed assistant head coach at Carlisle United, once again linking up with head coach Williamson. On 17 February 2025, Watson left Carlisle following the appointment of Mark Hughes as manager.

On 3 March 2025, Watson was named a part of the interim coaching staff at Milton Keynes Dons. He left the club on 28 May 2025, in order to pursue a managerial career.

== Managerial career ==
=== South Shields ===
On 28 May 2025, Watson was appointed manager of National League North side South Shields. He was named Manager of the Month for August and September 2025.

=== Rochdale ===
On 9 June 2026, Watson was appointed head coach of League Two side Rochdale on a three-year contract. After winning just four of 16 League matches, Watson was sacked on 22 November 2026 after only five months in charge.

== Managerial statistics ==
As of 21 November 2026

Managerial record by team and tenure
Team	From	To	Record					Ref.
Team	From	To	P	W	D	L	Win %	Ref.
South Shields	28 May 2025	9 June 2026	54	33	11	10	61.1	
Rochdale	9 June 2026	22 November 2026	22	5	5	12	22.7	
Total			76	38	16	22	50.0	

== Honours ==
Individual

- National League North Manager of the Month: August 2025, September 2025
