= Sam Beckwith =

English association football player

Personal information
- Full name: Samuel Wayne Beckwith
- Date of birth: 11 December 2001 (age 24)
- Place of birth: Bedford, England
- Height: 5 ft 10 in (1.78 m)
- Position: Defender

Team information
- Current team: Rochdale
- Number: 33

Youth career
- –2020: Luton Town

Senior career*
| Years | Team | Apps | (Gls) |
| 2020–2022 | Luton Town | 0 | (0) |
| 2020 | → Biggleswade Town (loan) | 4 | (0) |
| 2021–2022 | → Maidenhead United (loan) | 30 | (0) |
| 2022–2024 | Maidenhead United | 64 | (4) |
| 2024– | Rochdale | 60 | (3) |
- * Club domestic league appearances and goals as of 18 Sep 2025 (UTC)

Samuel Wayne Beckwith (born 11 December 2001) is an English professional footballer who plays as a defender for EFL League Two club Rochdale.

== Career ==
Born in Bedford, Bedfordshire, Beckwith joined Luton Town as an under-8 and signed a development contract in October 2019. He joined Southern League Premier Division Central club Biggleswade Town on 6 February 2020 on a one-month youth loan, which was later extended by a further month. Beckwith made four appearances by the time the 2019–20 Southern Football League season was abandoned and results expunged because of the COVID-19 pandemic in the United Kingdom. He was named Luton Town Young Player of the Season at the club's end of season awards. Luton took up the option to extend Beckwith's contract in July 2021. Beckwith made his senior debut in a 2–2 away draw with Stevenage in the EFL Cup first round on 10 August 2021, which Luton lost 3–0 in a penalty shoot-out. He was loaned out to National League club Maidenhead United on 27 August 2021 for the 2021–22 season. He made 31 appearances for the Magpies during the season. At the end of the 2021–22 season, he was released by the Hatters. Following his release, Beckwith returned to Maidenhead United on a permanent basis in June 2022.

In April 2024, he was named Vanarama National League player of the month. He left Maidenhead at the end of the 2023–24 season after turning down a new contract. 2024–25 season.

On 5 July 2024, Beckwith signed a two-year contract with Rochdale.

== Career statistics ==
As of match played 20 April 2024

Appearances and goals by club, season and competition
| Club | Season | League | | | FA Cup | | EFL Cup | | Other | | Total | |
| Club | Season | Division | Apps | Goals | Apps | Goals | Apps | Goals | Apps | Goals | Apps | Goals |
|---|---|---|---|---|---|---|---|---|---|---|---|---|
| Luton Town | 2021–22 | Championship | 0 | 0 | — | | 1 | 0 | — | | 1 | 0 |
| Biggleswade Town (loan) | 2019–20 | SFL Premier Division Central | 4 | 0 | 0 | 0 | — | | 0 | 0 | 4 | 0 |
| Maidenhead United (loan) | 2021–22 | National League | 30 | 0 | 1 | 0 | — | | 0 | 0 | 31 | 0 |
| Maidenhead United | 2022–23 | National League | 21 | 0 | 1 | 0 | — | | 1 (Note: Appearance(s) in FA Trophy) | 0 | 23 | 0 |
| Maidenhead United | 2023–24 | National League | 43 | 4 | 2 | 0 | — | | 1 | 0 | 46 | 4 |
| Maidenhead United | Total | | 64 | 4 | 3 | 0 | 0 | 0 | 2 | 0 | 69 | 4 |
| Career total | | | 98 | 4 | 4 | 0 | 1 | 0 | 2 | 0 | 105 | 4 |

== Honours ==
Rochdale

- National League play-offs: 2026

Individual

- Luton Town Young Player of the Season: 2019–20
- National League Player of the Month: April 2024
- National League Team of the Season: 2024–25
