= Rochdale A.F.C. =

Association football club in Greater Manchester, England

Rochdale
- Full name: Rochdale Association Football Club
- Nickname: The Dale
- Founded: 1907; 119 years ago
- Ground: Spotland Stadium
- Capacity: 10,249
- Chairman: Simon Gauge; Cameron Ogden
- Manager: Vacant
- League: EFL League Two
- 2025–26: National League, 2nd of 24 (promoted via play-offs)
- Website: rochdaleafc.co.uk
Home colours	Away colours

Rochdale Association Football Club is a professional association football club based in the town of Rochdale, Greater Manchester, England. The club competes in the EFL League Two, the fourth tier of English football, following promotion via the National League play-offs. Nicknamed 'The Dale', they have played home matches at Spotland Stadium since 1920, contesting longstanding rivalries with Bury and Oldham Athletic.

Founded in 1907, Rochdale initially entered the Manchester League, moving to the Lancashire Combination in the 1908–09 season. After securing promotion out of Division Two in 1909–10 they won the Division One title in 1910–11 and 1911–12. They then switched to the Central League, before being invited into the Football League when the Third Division North was created in 1921. The club remained in the division for 37 years and became members of the new nationwide Third Division in 1958, but were relegated the following year. They reached the League Cup final in 1962 and secured promotion out of the Fourth Division in 1968–69. Relegated in 1974, Rochdale remained in the fourth tier for 36 seasons after unsuccessful play-off campaigns in 2002, 2008 and 2009. The club finally secured promotion in 2009–10 and following relegation in 2012 were promoted to the third tier for a third time in 2013–14, but were relegated back to League Two in 2020–21. After 102 years as a Football League club, they were relegated to the National League at the end of the 2022–23 season, but returned to League Two in 2026.

== History ==
=== 1907–1999 ===
A chart showing the progress of Rochdale through the English football league system from joining in 1907–08 to the present

Rochdale A.F.C. was formed in 1907. After World War I the Football League was expanded and the club unsuccessfully applied to join. In 1921 Rochdale were included in the new Third Division North, and played their first League game at home against Accrington Stanley on 27 August 1921, winning 6–3. However, this first season ended with the club at the bottom of the League, having to reapply for membership.

In 1958, the League was restructured with the two regional Third Division sections being combined into new national Third and Fourth Divisions. In the restructuring, Rochdale secured a spot in the Third Division but were relegated in last place at the end of their first season at this level.

The club reached the League Cup final in 1962 led by Tony Collins. This was the first time a club from the bottom league division had reached the final of a major competition – where they lost to Norwich City 4–0 on aggregate. Rochdale had beaten Southampton, Doncaster Rovers, Charlton Athletic, York City, and Blackburn Rovers on their route to the final.

The club's first promotion came in 1969, earned by a team largely assembled by manager Bob Stokoe, though it was Stokoe's assistant, Len Richley who steered Rochdale to promotion after Stokoe moved to Carlisle United. In the early stages of the 1969–70 season, Rochdale topped the Third Division table, but the team's form significantly declined around Christmas 1969, and a failure to halt the team's decline led to the dismissal of Richley. He was succeeded by Dick Conner, who stabilised the club's form and steered them to a ninth-place finish. The following three seasons saw the club finish in the lower reaches of the Third Division table, narrowly avoiding relegation each time. The board viewed merely surviving in the Third Division as unacceptable and replaced Conner with Walter Joyce for the 1973–74 season. This move failed to pay off, and Rochdale were relegated after a campaign in which they won only two of 46 league games.

The club finished bottom of the league in 1977–78 but were successful in their bid for re-election. Southport, which had finished one place above Rochdale, were demoted instead and replaced by Wigan Athletic. Rochdale finished bottom for a second time in 1979–80, but were again re-elected, by one vote over Altrincham. In 1989–90 the club reached the fifth round of the FA Cup for the first time but lost 1–0 to Crystal Palace.

Steve Parkin was appointed as manager in 1998, a period in which the success of the club improved significantly with the emergence of talented players such as Gary Jones, Clive Platt, Grant Holt and Kevin Townson.

=== 21st century ===
==== 2000–2010 ====
Parkin left to take over at Barnsley in November 2001 with Rochdale second in the Third Division. This gained him little popularity with the fans, especially when he took Gary Jones with him. John Hollins was appointed as his successor and the club finished the season in 5th place, entering the promotion play-offs where they lost to Rushden & Diamonds in the semi-final.

The club reached the fifth round of the FA Cup again the following season, but lost 3–1 at Wolves. Hollins was replaced by Paul Simpson in 2002, and Alan Buckley, appointed and sacked as manager in 2003. Parkin then returned to the club as manager, until being sacked in December 2006.

Parkin's replacement, Keith Hill, who was initially appointed as caretaker manager, became arguably the club's most successful manager to date. Hill and his assistant manager David Flitcroft led Rochdale to a 5th-place finish in 2007–08, securing a play-off place. After beating Darlington 5–4 on penalties in the semi-final, Rochdale reached Wembley for the first time in their history. Despite taking the lead in the match, they lost the final 3–2 to Stockport County.

In the 2008–09 season, Rochdale reached the League Two playoffs for the second consecutive season, finishing 6th in the table on 70 points. Rochdale lost 2–1 on aggregate to Gillingham in the playoff semi-finals. Season 2009–10 ended a 41-year wait for promotion with a win over Northampton Town as Rochdale secured the third automatic promotion spot. Rochdale had played 36 consecutive seasons in the Football League's bottom division from 1974 to 2010, the longest any team has been in the bottom division of the League, with some even derisively calling it "the Rochdale Division".

Rochdale continued their progression under Keith Hill, now with the club for 3 years, with a secured spot in League One in 2010–11. In 2010–11 Rochdale finished 9th in league one with 68 points, equalling their highest league finish since 1969–70.

==== 2010–2014 ====
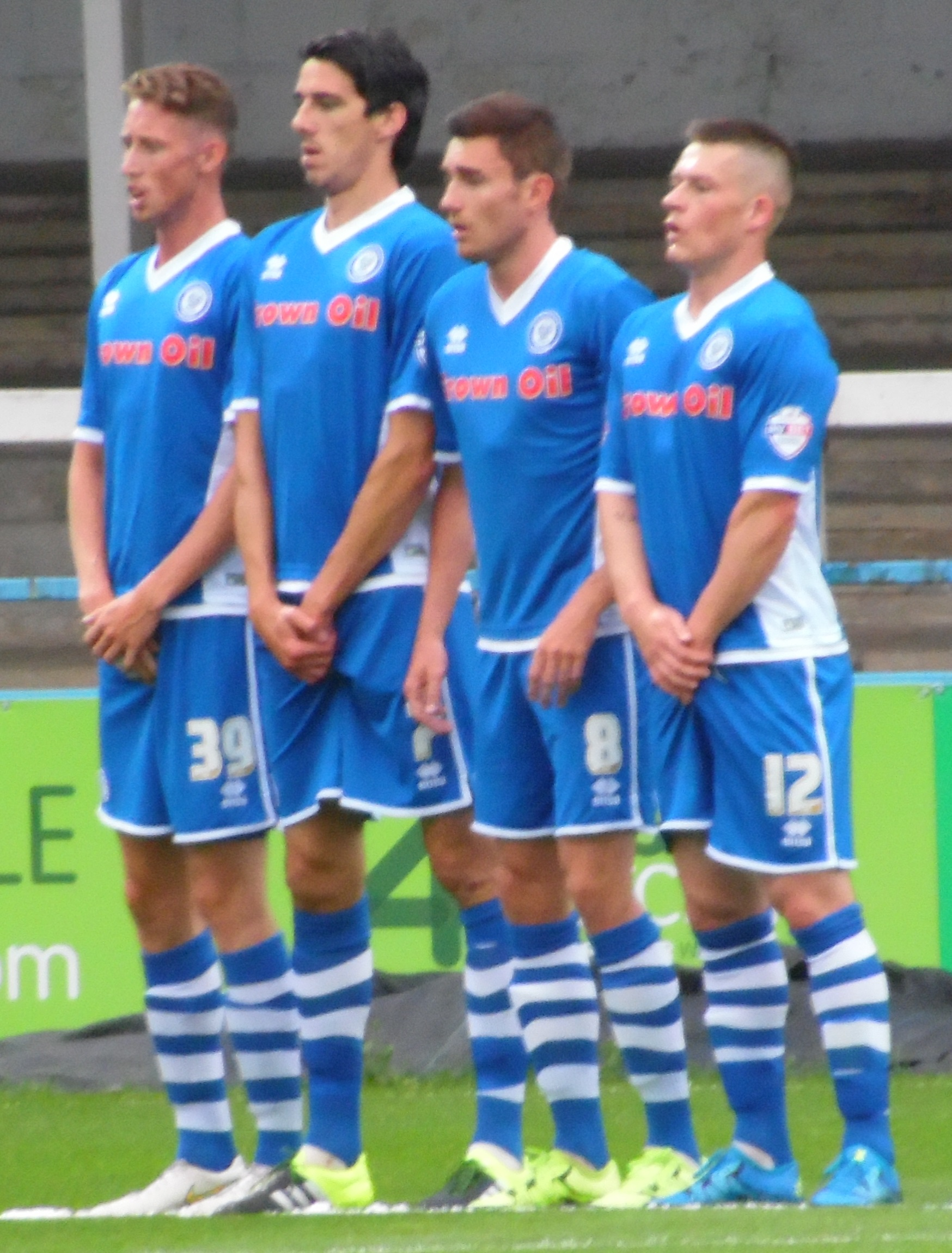
Rochdale players Joe Bunney, Peter Vincenti, Matty Lund and Donal McDermott line-up in a wall against Blackburn Rovers in July 2015

On 1 June 2011 manager Keith Hill joined Championship club Barnsley. Former Manchester City apprentice and youth coach Steve Eyre was confirmed as Hill's replacement on 12 June 2011. Eyre's spell at Spotland did not last long, as he was sacked after 27 competitive games in charge, the team having recorded just 4 league wins in this time. Eyre's last game was a 0–0 draw against Yeovil, in which Yeovil's keeper Rene Gilmartin played the second half with a dislocated finger. Director of youth Chris Beech was then appointed as caretaker manager. Under Beech's first game in charge, the team drew 1–1 with Preston North End with an equaliser from Daniel Bogdanović who scored on his debut. Beech's 5 games in charge ended with a 5–1 defeat by Stevenage and a 3–0 defeat to bottom of league Wycombe Wanderers.

On 24 January 2012, Accrington Stanley's John Coleman was confirmed manager as the successor to Steve Eyre and left his club where he had been for more than a decade. John Coleman's first match in charge was a 3–0 win at home over Bury in the local derby. However, on 21 April, Rochdale lost 2–1 to Chesterfield resulting in relegation from League One after two years in the league. John Coleman's and Jimmy Bell's contracts were terminated by Rochdale on 21 January 2013 following a poor run in form. In January 2013, Keith Hill, previously in charge of Rochdale from 2007 to 2011, was appointed as the new manager.

The 2013–14 season was much more successful for Rochdale, they were promoted to League One in third-place on 26 April 2014, after beating Cheltenham Town 2–0. One of the highlights of the season was reaching the fourth round of the FA Cup for the first time in eleven years after beating Championship side Leeds United 2–0.

==== Return to League One (2014–2021) ====
Playing at the club's highest level, the 2014–15 season was the club's most successful yet. Rochdale missed out on the playoffs by six points, eventually finishing in 8th place, their highest league placing. The club impressed in the FA Cup again, this time reaching the fourth round, losing out 4–1 to Premier League side Stoke City. The 2015–16 season saw Rochdale finish 10th in League One, whilst they finished 9th in 2016–17.

In 2017–18, Rochdale narrowly avoided relegation, finishing 20th in League One. Despite a poor domestic season, Rochdale reached the fifth round of the FA Cup where they met Premier League side Tottenham Hotspur at Spotland. Rochdale held Tottenham to a 2–2 draw, resulting in a replay at Wembley Stadium where Rochdale lost out 6–1. On 4 March 2019, Rochdale sacked manager Keith Hill after six years in charge: with Rochdale in 22nd place. Hill was replaced by Brian Barry-Murphy who led Rochdale to 16th place in the 2018–19 season. In the 2019–20 season, Rochdale reached the third round of the EFL Cup where they lost 5–3 on penalties at Old Trafford against Manchester United after holding the Red Devils to a 1–1 draw in normal time in front of 5,500 travelling supporters. Rochdale also reached the FA Cup third round where they managed a 1–1 home draw with Premier League side Newcastle United, before losing the replay 4–1 at St James' Park. However, the COVID-19 pandemic forced the cancellation of the season after 34 matches. Final league positions were decided on a points per game basis, with Rochdale finishing in 18th place.

==== League Two (2021–2023) ====
After finishing 21st, Rochdale were relegated from League One at the end of the 2020–21 season, and finished 18th in their first League Two campaign. The club started the 2022–23 season with five straight defeats, and sacked manager Robbie Stockdale in mid-August 2022; the side's first league win came in their 10th game, away at Colchester United, overseen by Jim Bentley who had been appointed manager on 29 August. Also in August 2022, Rochdale settled a High Court action regarding an attempted hostile takeover of the club by investors Morton House MGT in July 2021; in October 2022, Rochdale were given a six-point penalty, suspended for two years, for failing to comply with EFL regulations over the attempted takeover. On 8 November 2023 Ian Henderson became Rochdale's all-time leading goalscorer, scoring against Salford City in a 1–0 home win to surpass Reg Jenkins' long standing record of 129 goals. On 27 March 2023, Rochdale sacked manager Bentley; under him, the side had won just six out of 32 league games and were 10 points from safety with eight games remaining. Jimmy McNulty was appointed interim manager, later taking on the role permanently. He was unable to keep Rochdale in the division as they were relegated to the National League after 102 years as a Football League club. At the time of their relegation, the club had played the most seasons in the Football League without ever having reached the top two tiers (95 seasons).

==== National League (2023–2026) ====
Rochdale's first National League season was overshadowed by financial difficulties, with chairman Simon Gauge warning the club faced liquidation if no new investment was found. In March 2024, club shareholders agreed to issue nine million new shares, and, in May 2024, the family of local businessman Peter Ogden completed a £2 million takeover of the club. The Dale finished 11th in their first season in the National League, and 4th in the 2024–25 season before losing a play-off eliminator against Southend United.

On the final matchday of the 2025–26 season, Rochdale were the hosts of a top-two matchup against York City, which could mean promotion for either team. While York City could've secured promotion with just a tie, Rochdale needed a win to secure league play. The game remained scoreless until extra time, when in the 95th minute, Rochdale forward Emmanuel Dieseruvwe headed the ball into the net, seemingly securing the top spot and promotion to League Two. As a result, Rochdale fans invaded the pitch, which delayed the start of play for 6 minutes, allowing York City time to regroup. Then, in the 103rd minute, York City forward Josh Stones scored a goal to tie the game up and secure promotion for them instead, which in turn, sent Rochdale to the promotion play-offs. They finished the 2025–26 season with a club record 106 points. Rochdale later won 2–1 over Scunthorpe United in the play-off semi-final. In the play-off final on 10 May 2026, Rochdale conceded two goals to Boreham Wood before scoring twice themselves, with the equaliser coming in stoppage time. The match finished 2–2 after extra time, and Rochdale won 3–1 on penalties to secure promotion back to the EFL League Two after three years.

==== League Two (2026–) ====
Following promotion, Jimmy McNulty departed for League One Stockport County, and was replaced by South Shields manager Ian Watson. After winning just four of 16 League Two matches, Watson was sacked on 22 November 2026 after only five months in charge.

== Club badge and colours ==
Rochdale home colours used until the 2006–07 season

The club crest used by Rochdale AFC is a variant of the arms of the former County Borough of Rochdale. The coat of arms, based on those of the local and reputed Rochdale family with certain additions, was granted to the Borough by Herald's College in 1857. At its centre, a shield shows a sack of wool and a cotton plant, representing the local wool and cotton industries. Around the edge of the shield sit eight martlets (birds). These are taken from the Rochdale family coat of arms (mentioned above) and are widely used on heraldic devices. Above the shield and helm (in the position technically known as the "crest" in heraldry) more local industry representations are made by the inclusion of a fleece of wool (suspended by a band) and the iron centre of an old mill-stone (known as a mill-rind).

A motto below the shield reads Crede Signo. Roughly translated, this means "Believe in the sign". The blazon (official heraldic description) for the arms reads as follows: "Argent a woolpack encircled by two branches of the cotton tree flowered and conjoint proper; a bordure sable charged with eight martlets of the field; and for a crest on a wreath of the colours a mill-rind sable and above a fleece argent banded or."

When Rochdale Metropolitan Borough Council was formed in 1974, a new coat of arms was created and awarded for council use. Rochdale A.F.C., however, retained their variant of the old Rochdale County Borough arms.

Rochdale's current home colours are black and blue shirts, white shorts and blue and black hooped socks. Previously, Rochdale's usual colours were blue and white, introduced in 1949. Prior to this, Rochdale wore black and white stripes, which was influenced by the strong Newcastle United side of 1907 (the year Rochdale was formed), the stripe which they adopted for their centenary season in 2007.

Rochdale's centenary kit, used in the 2007–08 season.

This black and white kit was re-introduced in the 2007–08 season as the one-off centenary kit; the new Internazionale-influenced design which succeeded it was an amalgamation of the striped kit and the blue kit to herald the second century of Rochdale's existence. Between 2010 and 2012 Rochdale's shirts were predominantly blue with black pinstripes on the body and black sleeves.

Rochdale's away kit comprises white shirts with a purple stripe, purple shorts and purple and white hooped socks. Other historical away kits have included yellow, teal, green and red. Other kits have included white shirts with black shorts, white shirts with blue shorts and a blue shirt with white sleeves.

=== Kit manufacturers and shirt sponsors ===
Rochdale has had sponsored shirts since 1983. Former sponsors include Carcraft, MMC Estates, All-in-One Garden Centre, Smith Metals, Keytech, Freebets.co.uk, Cabrini and the Co-operative. On 28 May 2013, Crown Oil was unveiled as the club's new principal sponsor.

It was announced in June 2009 that the kit supplier for the next three seasons would be Carbrini.

From 2012 to 2015, Rochdale's kit was supplied by Fila.

On 25 April 2015, Rochdale revealed Erreà as their new supplier.

On 8 February 2023, the club announced that their kits would be supplied by O'Neills.

== Stadium ==
Rochdale plays their home matches at Spotland Stadium, known locally as just Spotland, and currently named the Crown Oil Arena as part of a sponsorship deal by the Bury-based fuel company Crown Oil. The stadium was officially opened in 1920, and was used exclusively by Rochdale for the first 68 years of its existence. From 1988 to 2016 the ground was jointly owned by the football club, Rochdale Council and rugby league club Rochdale Hornets. In 2016 Rochdale A.F.C. bought the stadium shares they did not hold to own 100% of Spotland Stadium.

Apart from local football and rugby league, Spotland has also hosted minor nations' rugby league matches, British Amateur Rugby League Association matches, and also the National League Cup finals of 2003 and 2004. Spotland was a venue for the 2013 Rugby League World Cup, hosting a match between Fiji and Ireland - the first time that Rochdale had staged an event in any sporting World Cup. The event was almost sold out with almost 9,000 people attending. This was incorrectly claimed to be a new stadium record, but Rochdale had 24,231 for an FA Cup tie vs Notts County in December 1949 and three higher crowds for FA Cup and play-off games between 1990 and 2008 against Northampton Town, Coventry City and Darlington.

Today Spotland has a capacity of 10,249 in four stands: the Co-Operative Stand (or Main Stand), the Thwaites Beer Stand (the Sandy Lane End), the T.D.S Stand (Pearl Street end) and the Westrose Leisure Stand (the Willbutts Lane Stand). Three are fully seated; the Sandy Lane End is a small standing terrace behind one of the goals.

The Main Stand features a statue of a long-standing Rochdale fan, David Clough, situated where he watched matches as a season-ticket holder. He had helped the club raise funds and left £250,000 to the club in his will when he died in 2020. The statue was unveiled in September 2021.

== Rivalries ==
Rochdale have a number of rivalries with both local and non-local clubs. Rochdale's traditional main rival are neighbours Oldham Athletic, but from the years 1974–2010, Rochdale spent those years in the Fourth Division of English football, whilst Oldham were always higher up in the Football League pyramid. This meant that the clubs only met in pre-season friendlies, however, the clubs have played each other a number of times since then. This lack of games between the two sides led to Rochdale building significant rivalries with other nearby clubs, the most notable being against neighbours Bury. Most Rochdale fans in the present day would consider Bury to be their main rivals, due to the tension in the games, which is known as the M66 Derby and considered to be one of the bigger derbies in the lower leagues. Rochdale also have a rivalry with nearby Yorkshire club Halifax Town. This fixture is intensified by the fact that this is a Lancashire-Yorkshire derby, also known as a Roses rivalry. Other rivalries of note include those with Stockport County, Burnley, Bolton Wanderers, Wigan Athletic and Accrington Stanley.

== Players ==
=== Current squad ===
As of 23 October 2026

Note: Flags indicate national team as defined under FIFA eligibility rules; some limited exceptions apply. Players may hold more than one non-FIFA nationality.

No.	Pos.	Nation	Player
1	GK	SWE	Nils Ramming (on loan from Brighton & Hove Albion)
2	DF	ENG	Charlie Tasker (on loan from Brighton & Hove Albion)
3	DF	ENG	Kaiden Wilson (on loan from Chelsea)
4	MF	ENG	Ryan East
5	DF	ENG	Laurence Maguire
6	DF	ENG	Ethan Ebanks-Landell (captain)
7	FW	IRL	Cian Hayes
8	MF	ENG	Harvey Gilmour
9	FW	ENG	Emmanuel Dieseruvwe
10	FW	ENG	Devante Rodney
11	FW	ENG	Zain Silcott-Duberry
12	GK	ENG	Jake Spaven
13	DF	ENG	Tobi Adebayo-Rowling
14	MF	ENG	Ed Francis
16	MF	ENG	Casey Pettit
17	MF	IRL	Baba Adeeko
18	FW	ENG	Jonny Smith
19	MF	ENG	Luke Hannant

No.	Pos.	Nation	Player
20	GK	ENG	Sam Waller
21	MF	ENG	Kane Taylor (on loan from Aston Villa)
22	DF	ENG	Dan Moss
26	DF	ENG	Sam Sherring
27	DF	ENG	Bryant Bilongo
28	MF	ENG	Will Jenkins
33	DF	ENG	Sam Beckwith
35	FW	ENG	Jamie Paterson
39	FW	JAM	Dajaune Brown (on loan from Derby County)
40	FW	ENG	Ian Henderson
44	DF	ENG	Aden Flint
45	FW	SCO	Glenn Middleton
54	DF	ENG	Thomas Bradley
56	MF	ENG	Reece Leonard
57	MF	ENG	Israel Pither
58	MF	ENG	Fabian Nowacki
60	FW	ENG	Lewis Platt
61	MF	ENG	Lucas Cunliffe
63	MF	ENG	Ronnie Brown

=== Out on loan ===
Note: Flags indicate national team as defined under FIFA eligibility rules; some limited exceptions apply. Players may hold more than one non-FIFA nationality.

No.	Pos.	Nation	Player

=== Retired numbers ===
Note: Flags indicate national team as defined under FIFA eligibility rules; some limited exceptions apply. Players may hold more than one non-FIFA nationality.

No.	Pos.	Nation	Player
15	MF	ENG	Joe Thompson (posthumous)

== Club officials ==
As of 14 August 2024

Position	Name
Co-chairmen	Simon Gauge and Cameron Ogden
Head of Football Operations	George Delves
Directors	Richard Knight, Tony Pockney, Murray Knight (Supporters Trust Representative), Jamie Willoughby and Adam Saul
President	Graham Morris
Life Vice Presidents	Andrew Kelly, Norma Jenkins and Trevor Butterworth
Honorary Life Vice President	Jack Northover
CEO	Laura Thomas

=== Coaching and medical staff ===
As of 22 November 2026

Position	Name
Head coach	vacant
Assistant head coach	Carl Magnay
Goalkeeping Coach & Head of Academy Goalkeeping	Josh Lillis
Physical Performance Coach	Bradley Rufus
First Team Sports Therapist	Cameron Lukash
Head Physiotherapist	Rebecca O'Loughlin

== Honours ==
League

- Third Division North (level 3)
  - Runners-up: 1923–24, 1926–27
- Fourth Division / League Two (level 4)
  - Promoted: 1968–69, 2009–10, 2013–14
- National League (level 5)
  - Play-off winners: 2026
- Lancashire Combination Division One
  - Champions: 1910–11, 1911–12

Cup

- Football League Cup
  - Runners-up: 1961–62
- Lancashire Cup
  - Winners: 1948–49, 1970–71, 2004–05

== Club records ==
- Record League victory – 8–1 vs. Chesterfield (18 December 1926)
- Fewest league wins in a season – 2, 1973–74
- Most points gained in a season – 106, 2025–26
- Highest home attendance – 24,231 vs. Notts County 1949–50
- Record league appearances – Gary Jones (464)
- Record league goalscorer – Ian Henderson (164)
- Most league goals in one season – Albert Whitehurst (44 in 1926–27)
- Highest transfer fee paid – £150,000 to Stoke City for Paul Connor, 2001
- Highest transfer fee received – £1,000,000 Wolverhampton Wanderers for Luke Matheson, 2020

=== Cup records ===
- Best FA Cup performance: Fifth round, 1989–90, 2002–03, 2017–18 (replay)
- Best EFL Cup performance: Runners-up, 1961–62
- Best EFL Trophy performance: Northern area final, 1994–95, 1999–2000
- Best FA Trophy performance: Semi-finals, 2024–25

== See also ==
- List of Rochdale A.F.C. players
