= Centurion (disambiguation) =

A centurion was a professional officer of the Roman army.

Centurion may also refer to:

== Places ==
- Centurion, South Africa
  - Centurion (Gautrain station)
- Centurion Bank, a submerged atoll southeast of Chagos Archipelago
- Centuriones, a historical name of El-Kentour, Algeria
- The Centurion, Bath, a public house

== Arts, entertainment, and media ==
=== Film and television ===
- The Centurion (film), a 1961 historical drama film
- Centurions (TV series), a 1986 science fiction animated television series
- Centurion (film), a 2010 historical thriller directed by Neil Marshall

=== Games and toys ===
- Centurion: Defender of Rome, a computer game
- Centurion (play-by-mail game), a space-based play-by-mail game
- Centurion, a 2013 Nerf Blaster released under the N-Strike Elite Mega series

=== Literature ===
- Centurion (novel), a 2007 novel by Simon Scarrow
- Éditions du Centurion, a French publishing house
- The Centurions (Hunter novel), a 1981 American novel by Damion Hunter
- The Centurions (Lartéguy novel), a 1960 French novel by Jean Lartéguy
- The Centurion, a 1989 novel by Jan de Hartog
- Centurion (magazine), a lifestyle magazine published by American Express
- The Centurion (magazine), a conservative magazine focused on Rutgers, the State University of New Jersey

=== Music ===
- The Centurians, an American surf rock band, aka Centurions

== Military equipment ==
- Centurion (tank), a British battle tank
- HMS Centurion, the name of several ships and a shore base of the British Royal Navy
- Centurion C-RAM (counter rocket, artillery, and mortar), a land-based version of the naval Phalanx CIWS (close-in weapon system)

== Plants ==
- Centurion, a California wine grape; see Olmo grapes § Other wine grapes
- Centurion (tree), the tallest eucalyptus in the world, 99.6 metres high

== Sport ==
- Centurion (racewalking) a racewalking competition over 100 miles to be completed within 24 hours
- Centurion Park, a South African cricket ground
- A batter who has scored a hundred runs in a single inning of a cricket match
- Centurions, an expansion team of ACT Gridiron, Canberra, Australia
- Leigh Centurions, the former name of English rugby league club Leigh Leopards
- A disc golf fairway driver by Infinite Discs
- Centurions, a nickname for the 2017–18 Manchester City F.C. team

== Transportation ==
- NASA Centurion, aircraft
- Centurion (bicycle company), manufacturer in Japan
- Buick Centurion, car built by General Motors
- Centurion Air Cargo, an airline
- Thielert Centurion, German series of aircraft engines
- Cessna 210 Centurion, aircraft

== People ==
- Diego Centurión, Paraguayan footballer
- El Centurión, stage name of wrestler Konnan
- Emanuel Centurión, Argentine footballer
- Ezequiel Centurión, Argentine footballer
- Feliciano Centurión, Paraguayan visual artist
- Germán Centurión, Paraguayan footballer
- Guillermo Centurión, Uruguayan footballer
- Hugo Pablo Centurión, Argentine footballer
- Iván Centurión, Argentine footballer
- Juan Crisóstomo Centurión, Paraguayan military officer
- Juan José Gómez Centurión, Argentinian politician
- Pablo Centurión, Paraguayan footballer
- Paulo Centurión, Argentine footballer
- Ramón Centurión, Argentine footballer
- Ricardo Centurión, Argentine footballer
- Roque Centurión Miranda, Paraguayan playwright and theater director
- Víctor Centurión, Paraguayan footballer

== Other uses ==
- Centurion (organization), U.S. non-profit organization
- Centurion Card, an American Express charge card
- Centurion Computer Corporation, a historical U.S. computer technology company.
- Statgraphics Centurion XV, statistical software

== See also ==
- Centurian (disambiguation)
- Centenarian a 100-year-old person
- Centurio (disambiguation)
- Century (disambiguation)
