= 2015–16 Bristol City F.C. season =

Bristol City
2015–16 season
- Manager: Steve Cotterill (until 14 January 2016); John Pemberton and Wade Elliott (caretaker) (From 14 January 2016); Lee Johnson (From 6 February 2016)
- Stadium: Ashton Gate
- Championship: 18th
- FA Cup: Third Round (eliminated by West Bromwich Albion)
- League Cup: First round (eliminated by Luton Town)
- Top goalscorer: League: Jonathan Kodjia (19); All: Jonathan Kodjia (20)
- Highest home attendance: 15,791 vs. Huddersfield Town (30 April 2016)
- Lowest home attendance: 14,291 vs. Brentford (15 August 2015)
- Average home league attendance: 15,292
Home colours	Away colours

The 2015–16 season was Bristol City's 118th season as a professional football club and their first back in the Championship following promotion last season. Along with competing in the Championship, the club also participated in the FA Cup and League Cup. The season covered the period from 1 July 2015 to 30 June 2016.

== Squad ==
No.	Name	Pos.	Nat.	Place of Birth	Age	Apps	Goals	Signed from	Date signed	Fee	End
Goalkeepers
1	Frank Fielding	GK	(England)	Blackburn	38	99	0	Derby County	26 June 2013	£200,000	2016
12	Richard O'Donnell	GK	(England)	Sheffield	37	21	0	Wigan Athletic	1 February 2016	Free	2018
24	Max O'Leary	GK	(England)	Bristol	29	2	0	Academy	8 August 2015	Trainee	2017
Defenders
2	Mark Little	RWB	(England)	Worcester	28	2	2	Peterborough United	25 June 2014	Free	2017
3	Derrick Williams	LB/CB	(Republic of Ireland)		33	132	4	Aston Villa	24 June 2014	Free	2016
4	Aden Flint	CB	(England)	Pinxton	36	148	24	Swindon Town	11 June 2013	£300,000	2019
5	Luke Ayling	CB/RB	(England)	London	34	94	4	Yeovil Town	8 July 2014	Undisclosed	2017
13	Scott Golbourne	LB	(England)	Bristol	38	32	1	Wolverhampton Wanderers	28 January 2016	Undisclosed	2018
16	Alex Pearce	CB	(England)	Wallingford	37	7	0	Derby County	19 January 2016	Loan	2016
17	Nathan Baker	CB	(England)	Worcester	35	37	1	Aston Villa	1 September 2015	Loan	2016
26	Adam Matthews	RB	(Wales)	Swansea	34	9	0	Sunderland	7 March 2016	Loan	2016
Midfielders
7	Korey Smith	CM	(England)	Hatfield, Herts	35	94	2	Oldham Athletic	27 June 2014	Undisclosed	2017
11	Scott Wagstaff	LM/LWB	(England)	Maidstone	36	89	9	Charlton Athletic	8 July 2013	Free	2016
14	Bobby Reid	CM	(England)	Bristol	33	70	4	Academy	29 April 2011	Trainee	2017
15	Luke Freeman	AM/WG	(England)	Dartford	34	99	8	Stevenage	26 June 2014	Undisclosed	2017
21	Marlon Pack	CM	(England)	Portsmouth	35	145	4	Cheltenham Town	2 August 2013	£100,000	2017
23	Joe Bryan	LM/LWB	(England)	Bristol	32	133	12	Academy	1 August 2011	Trainee	2019
Forwards
9	Lee Tomlin	SS	(England)	Leicester	37	18	6	Bournemouth	27 January 2016	Loan	2016
10	Kieran Agard	CF	(England)	Newham	36	74	18	Rotherham United	21 August 2014	Undisclosed	2017
18	Aaron Wilbraham	CF	(England)	Knutsford	46	89	29	Crystal Palace	2 July 2014	Free	2017
19	Paul Garita	CF	(Cameroon)	Douala	30	0	0	Châteauroux	7 January 2016	£50,000	Undisclosed
22	Jonathan Kodjia	CF	(France)	Saint-Denis	36	48	20	Angers	20 July 2015	£2,000,000	2018
27	Peter Odemwingie	CF/WG	(Nigeria)	Tashkent	44	7	2	Stoke City	11 March 2016	Loan	2016
6	Adam El-Abd	CB	(Egypt)	Brighton	41	21	0	Brighton & Hove Albion	16 January 2014	Undisclosed	2017
20	Wesley Burns	WG	(Wales)	Cardiff	31	53	4	Academy	18 December 2012	Trainee	2017
—	Karleigh Osborne	CB	(England)	Southall	38	32	1	Millwall	7 January 2014	Undisclosed	2016

=== Statistics ===
As of 8 May 2016

No.	Pos	Nat	Player	Total		Championship		FA Cup		League Cup	
No.	Pos	Nat	Player	Apps	Goals	Apps	Goals	Apps	Goals	Apps	Goals
1	GK	(England) ENG	Frank Fielding	22	0	21+0	0	1+0	0	0+0	0
2	DF	(England) ENG	Mark Little	7	0	2+3	0	2+0	0	0+0	0
3	DF	(Republic of Ireland) IRL	Derrick Williams	26	1	21+3	1	1+0	0	1+0	0
4	DF	(England) ENG	Aden Flint	47	6	44+0	6	2+0	0	1+0	0
5	DF	(England) ENG	Luke Ayling	36	0	29+4	0	1+1	0	1+0	0
7	MF	(England) ENG	Korey Smith	39	0	37+0	0	1+0	0	1+0	0
9	FW	(England) ENG	Lee Tomlin (on loan from Bournemouth)	18	6	18+0	6	0+0	0	0+0	0
10	FW	(England) ENG	Kieran Agard	26	3	6+17	2	0+2	1	0+1	0
11	MF	(England) ENG	Scott Wagstaff	9	1	1+7	1	1+0	0	0+0	0
12	GK	(England) ENG	Richard O'Donnell	21	0	21+0	0	0+0	0	0+0	0
14	MF	(England) ENG	Bobby Reid	30	2	16+12	2	1+0	0	0+1	0
15	MF	(England) ENG	Luke Freeman	44	1	36+5	1	2+0	0	1+0	0
16	DF	(England) ENG	Alex Pearce (on loan from Derby County)	7	0	3+4	0	0+0	0	0+0	0
17	DF	(England) ENG	Nathan Baker (on loan from Aston Villa)	37	1	36+0	1	1+0	0	0+0	0
18	FW	(England) ENG	Aaron Wilbraham	46	8	25+18	8	1+1	0	1+0	0
21	MF	(England) ENG	Marlon Pack	48	1	45+0	1	2+0	0	1+0	0
22	FW	(France) FRA	Jonathan Kodjia	48	20	43+2	19	1+1	1	1+0	0
23	MF	(England) ENG	Joe Bryan	40	2	34+5	2	1+0	0	0+0	0
24	GK	(England) ENG	Max O'Leary	2	0	0+0	0	1+1	0	0+0	0
25	DF	(England) ENG	Zak Vyner	4	0	2+2	0	0+0	0	0+0	0
26	DF	(Wales) WAL	Adam Matthews (on loan from Sunderland)	9	0	9+0	0	0+0	0	0+0	0
27	FW	(Nigeria) NGA	Peter Odemwingie (on loan from Stoke City)	7	2	3+4	2	0+0	0	0+0	0
30	MF	(England) ENG	George Dowling	2	0	0+2	0	0+0	0	0+0	0
First team players out on loan:
20	FW	(Wales) WAL	Wes Burns	17	1	2+12	1	1+1	0	0+1	0
Players who have left the club during the season:
8	MF	(England) ENG	Ben Gladwin (on loan from Queens Park Rangers)	1	0	1+0	0	0+0	0	0+0	0
8	FW	(England) ENG	Callum Robinson (on loan from Aston Villa)	7	1	1+5	0	0+0	0	1+0	1
9	FW	(England) ENG	Simon Cox (on loan from Reading)	3	0	0+3	0	0+0	0	0+0	0
12	DF	(England) ENG	Ryan Fredericks	5	0	3+1	0	0+0	0	1+0	0
13	MF	(England) ENG	Elliott Bennett (on loan from Norwich City)	14	0	14+0	0	0+0	0	0+0	0
16	DF	(England) ENG	Liam Moore (on loan from Leicester City)	10	0	5+5	0	0+0	0	0+0	0
19	GK	(England) ENG	Ben Hamer (on loan from Leicester City)	5	0	4+0	0	0+0	0	1+0	0

==== Goals record ====
As of 7 May 2016

Rank	No.	Po.	Name	Championship	FA Cup	League Cup	Total
1	22	FW	(France) Jonathan Kodjia	19	1	0	20
2	18	FW	(England) Aaron Wilbraham	8	0	0	8
3	4	DF	(England) Aden Flint	6	0	0	6
3	9	FW	(England) Lee Tomlin	6	0	0	6
5	10	FW	(England) Kieran Agard	2	1	0	3
6	14	MF	(England) Bobby Reid	2	0	0	2
6	23	MF	(England) Joe Bryan	2	0	0	2
6	27	FW	(Nigeria) Peter Odemwingie	2	0	0	2
9	3	DF	(Republic of Ireland) Derrick Williams	1	0	0	1
9	8	FW	(England) Callum Robinson	0	0	1	1
9	11	MF	(England) Scott Wagstaff	1	0	0	1
9	15	MF	(England) Luke Freeman	1	0	0	1
9	17	DF	(England) Nathan Baker	1	0	0	1
9	20	FW	(Wales) Wes Burns	1	0	0	1
9	21	MF	(England) Marlon Pack	1	0	0	1
Total				54	2	1	58*

- Includes one goal in the League

==== Disciplinary record ====
As of 7 May 2016

No.	Po.	Name	Championship		FA Cup		League Cup		Total	
No.	Po.	Name	Booked	Sent off (straight red)	Booked	Sent off (straight red)	Booked	Sent off (straight red)	Booked	Sent off (straight red)
4	DF	(England) Aden Flint	5	0	0	0	0	0	5	0
5	DF	(England) Luke Ayling	3	0	0	0	0	0	3	0
7	MF	(England) Korey Smith	4	1	0	0	0	0	4	1
9	FW	(England) Lee Tomlin	3	0	0	0	0	0	3	0
10	FW	(England) Kieran Agard	2	0	0	0	0	0	2	0
12	GK	(England) Richard O'Donnell	1	0	0	0	0	0	1	0
~~12~~	DF	(England) Ryan Fredericks	2	0	0	0	0	0	2	0
~~13~~	MF	(England) Elliott Bennett	1	0	0	0	0	0	1	0
14	MF	(England) Bobby Reid	2	0	0	0	0	0	2	0
15	MF	(England) Luke Freeman	4	1	0	0	0	0	4	1
16	DF	(England) Alex Pearce	1	0	0	0	0	0	1	0
~~16~~	DF	(England) Liam Moore	2	0	0	0	0	0	2	0
17	DF	(England) Nathan Baker	8	1	1	0	0	0	9	1
18	FW	(England) Aaron Wilbraham	5	0	0	0	0	0	5	0
~~19~~	GK	(England) Ben Hamer	1	0	0	0	0	0	1	0
20	FW	(Wales) Wes Burns	1	0	0	0	0	0	1	0
21	MF	(England) Marlon Pack	8	0	0	0	0	0	8	0
22	FW	(France) Jonathan Kodjia	5	0	1	0	0	0	6	0
23	MF	(England) Joe Bryan	4	0	0	0	0	0	4	0
25	DF	(England) Zak Vyner	1	0	0	0	0	0	1	0
Total			64	3	2	0	0	0	66	3

=== Contracts ===
No.	Pos.	Nat.	Name	Age	Status	Contract length	Expiry date	Source
21	MF	(England)	Marlon Pack	24	Signed	2 years	June 2017	BBC Spor
4	DF	(England)	Aden Flint	25	Extended	2 years	June 2019	BBC Sport
23	MF	(England)	Joe Bryan	21	Extended	3 years	June 2019	BBC Sport
18	FW	(England)	Aaron Wilbraham	36	Signed	1 years	June 2017	BBC Sport
14	MF	(England)	Bobby Reid	23	Signed	1 year	June 2017	BBC Sport
20	FW	(Wales)	Wes Burns	21	Signed	1 year	June 2017	BBC Sport
14	MF	(England)	Bobby Reid	23	Signed	2 years	June 2019	BBC Sport

== Transfers ==
=== Transfers in ===
Date from	Position	Nationality	Name	From	Fee	Ref.
20 July 2015	CF	FRA	Jonathan Kodjia	Angers	£2,000,000	
6 August 2015	RB	ENG	Ryan Fredericks	Tottenham Hotspur	Undisclosed	
7 January 2016	CF	CMR	Paul Garita	Châteauroux	£50,000	
28 January 2016	LB	ENG	Scott Golbourne	Wovlerhampton Wanderers	Undisclosed	
1 February 2016	GK	ENG	Richard O'Donnell	Wigan Athletic	Undisclosed	

Total spending: ▼£2,050,000

=== Transfers out ===
Date from	Position	Nationality	Name	To	Fee	Ref.
1 July 2015	AM	ENG	Wade Elliott	Retired	—N/a	
1 July 2015	CF	ENG	Jay Emmanuel-Thomas	Queens Park Rangers (Note: Following Emmanuel-Thomas' release he joined Queens Park Rangers.)	Free transfer	
1 July 2015	GK	WAL	Dave Richards	Crewe Alexandra (Note: Following Richards' release he joined Crewe Alexandra.)	Free transfer	
27 July 2015	LB	IRL	Greg Cunningham	Preston North End	Undisclosed	
31 August 2015	RB	ENG	Ryan Fredericks	Fulham	Undisclosed	
16 September 2015	CM	ENG	Gus Mafuta	Gateshead	Free transfer	

=== Loans in ===
Date from	Position	Nationality	Name	From	Date until	Ref.
7 August 2015	CF	ENG	Callum Robinson	Aston Villa	5 January 2016	
11 August 2015	GK	ENG	Ben Hamer	Leicester City	17 November 2015	
1 September 2015	CB	ENG	Liam Moore	Leicester City	4 January 2016	
1 September 2015	CB	ENG	Nathan Baker	Aston Villa	End of season	
9 October 2015	RW	JAM	Elliott Bennett	Norwich City	3 January 2016	
9 October 2015	CF	ENG	Simon Cox	Reading	3 January 2016	
12 January 2016	GK	ENG	Richard O'Donnell	Wigan Athletic	1 February 2016	
19 January 2016	CM	ENG	Ben Gladwin	Queens Park Rangers	20 March 2016	
19 January 2016	CB	ENG	Alex Pearce	Derby County	End of Season	
27 January 2016	SS	ENG	Lee Tomlin	Bournemouth	End of Season	
7 March 2016	RB	WAL	Adam Matthews	Sunderland	End of Season	
11 March 2016	FW	NGA	Peter Odemwingie	Stoke City	End of Season	

=== Loans out ===
Date from	Position	Nationality	Name	To	Date until	Ref.
2 July 2015	CB	ENG	Karleigh Osborne	AFC Wimbledon	End of Season	
16 February 2016	WG	WAL	Wes Burns	Fleetwood Town	8 May 2016	
26 February 2016	CB	EGY	Adam El-Abd	Gillingham	End of Season	
18 March 2016	GK	ENG	Max O'Leary	Kidderminster Harriers	14 April 2016 (Note: O'Leary's was recalled on 14 April.)	

== Competitions ==
=== Pre-season friendlies ===
5 July 2015 Community Match	Brislington and Keynsham Town	0–5	Bristol City	Brislington
		Report	Smith; Reid; Pack; Harper

10 July 2015 Friendly	Bath City	0–1	Bristol City	Twerton
19:45 BST		Report	Wilbraham 12' (pen.)	Stadium: Twerton Park

18 July 2015 Friendly	Farense	1–1	Bristol City	Albufeira, Portugal
18:30 CEST	Rashid 57'	Report	Flint 72'	Stadium: Estadio da Nora

21 July 2015 Friendly	Braga	1–1	Bristol City	Albufeira, Portugal
15:00 CEST	Martins 70'	Report	Freeman 8'	Stadium: Estadio da Nora

30 July 2015 Friendly	Yeovil Town	1–0	Bristol City	Yeovil
19:45 BST	Mellason 90'	Report		Stadium: Huish Park

=== Championship ===
==== League table ====
Pos	Team	Pld	W	D	L	GF	GA	GD	Pts
16	Nottingham Forest	46	13	16	17	43	47	−4	55
17	Reading	46	13	13	20	52	59	−7	52
18	Bristol City	46	13	13	20	54	71	−17	52
19	Huddersfield Town	46	13	12	21	59	70	−11	51
20	Fulham	46	12	15	19	66	79	−13	51

Source: BBC Sport
Rules for classification: 1) Points; 2) Goal difference; 3) Number of goals scored

==== Matches ====
8 August 2015 1	Sheffield Wednesday	2–0	Bristol City	Owlerton
15:00 BST	Wallace (yellow card) 43'; Lees 60'; McGugan 71'	BBC Sport	(yellow card) 43' Fredericks; (yellow card) 65' Pack; (yellow card) 90+7' Wilbraham	Stadium: Hillsborough; Attendance: 23,255; Referee: James Adcock

15 August 2015 2	Bristol City	2–4	Brentford	Bristol
15:00 BST	Kodjia 2'; Pack (yellow card) 6'; Wilbraham 23'; Freeman (red card) 35'	BBC Report	9' Judge; (yellow card) 21' Gogia; 43' (og) Williams; 60' Gray; 71' Hofmann	Stadium: Ashton Gate; Attendance: 14,291; Referee: Keith Stroud

19 August 2015 3	Bristol City	2–2	Leeds United	Bristol
19:45 BST	Fredricks (yellow card) 3'; Hamer (yellow card) 39'; Agard 89'; Flint 90+5'	Report	(yellow card) 37' Adeyemi; 39' (pen.) Antenucci; 52' (yellow card) 90+3' Wood; (yellow card) 53' Bamba; (yellow card) 70' Bryam; (yellow card) 90' Wootton	Stadium: Ashton Gate; Attendance: 14,712; Referee: Andy Davies

22 August 2015 4	Middlesbrough	0–1	Bristol City	Middlesbrough
15:00 BST		Report	8' Bryan; (yellow card) 37' Wilbraham	Stadium: Riverside Stadium; Attendance: 22,236; Referee: Paul Tierney

29 August 2015 5	Bristol City	1–2	Burnley	Bristol
15:00 BST	Kodjia 90'	Report	Mee 34'; Keane 40'	Stadium: Ashton Gate; Attendance: 15,002; Referee: Mike Dean

12 September 2015 6	Birmingham City	4–2	Bristol City	Birmingham
15:00 BST	Donaldson 10', 20', 41' (pen.); Grounds 77'	Report	Kodjia 32', 66'	Stadium: St Andrew's; Attendance: 18,819; Referee: Mark Brown

15 September 2015 7	Preston North End	1–1	Bristol City	Preston
19:45 BST	Kilkenny 40'	Report	Wilbraham 81'	Stadium: Deepdale; Attendance: 9,963; Referee: Eddie Ilderton

19 September 2015 8	Bristol City	0–2	Reading	Bristol
15:00 BST		Report	9' Blackman; 13' McCleary	Stadium: Ashton Gate Stadium; Attendance: 15,385; Referee: Steve Martin

26 September 2015 9	Ipswich Town	2–2	Bristol City	Ipswich
15:00 BST	Chambers 46'; Sears 86'	Report	53' Freeman; 56' Kodjia	Stadium: Portman Road; Attendance: 20,347; Referee: Peter Bankes

3 October 2015 10	Bristol City	1–1	Milton Keynes Dons	Bristol
15:00 BST	Kodjia 6'	Report	90' Powell	Stadium: Ashton Gate Stadium; Attendance: 14,535; Referee: Darren Bond

16 October 2015 11	Bristol City	2–0	Nottingham Forest	Bristol
19:45 BST	Wilbraham 4', 11'	Report		Stadium: Ashton Gate Stadium; Attendance: 15,285; Referee: Lee Mason

20 October 2015 12	Brighton & Hove Albion	2–1	Bristol City	Brighton
15:00 BST	Baldock 53'; Zamora 82'	Report	17' Williams	Stadium: AMEX Stadium; Attendance: 23,181; Referee: Iain Williamson

26 October 2015 13	Cardiff City	0–0	Bristol City	Cardiff
19:45 GMT		Report		Stadium: Cardiff City Stadium; Attendance: 15,287; Referee: Craig Pawson

31 October 2015 14	Bristol City	1–4	Fulham	Bristol
15:00 GMT	Kodjia 90'	Report	2', 18' Dembele; 33' McCormack; 36' Tunnicliffe	Stadium: Ashton Gate Stadium; Attendance: 15,752; Referee: Andy Woolmer

3 November 2015 15	Bristol City	1–0	Wolverhampton Wanderers	Bristol
19:45 GMT	Kodjia 45'	Report		Stadium: Ashton Gate Stadium; Attendance: 15,517; Referee: Simon Hooper

7 November 2015 16	Bolton Wanderers	0–0	Bristol City	Bolton
15:00 GMT		Report		Stadium: Macron Stadium; Attendance: 14,239; Referee: Stuart Atwell

21 November 2015 17	Bristol City	1–1	Hull City	Bristol
15:00 GMT	Agard 39'	Report	73' Maloney	Stadium: Ashton Gate Stadium; Attendance: 14,590; Referee: Paul Tierney

28 November 2015 18	Rotherham United	3–0	Bristol City	Rotherham
19:45 GMT	Clarke-Harris 9', 27' (pen); Frecklington 75'	Report		Stadium: New York Stadium; Attendance: 8,949; Referee: Tim Robinson

5 December 2015 19	Bristol City	0–2	Blackburn Rovers	Bristol
15:00 GMT	Baker (red card)	Report	59' Hanley; 89' (pen) Marshall	Stadium: Ashton Gate Stadium; Attendance: 15,021; Referee: Geoff Eltringham

12 December 2015 20	Huddersfield Town	1–2	Bristol City	Huddersfield
15:00 GMT	Bunn 84'	Report	7' Kodjia; 29' Flint	Stadium: John Smith's Stadium; Attendance: 13,255; Referee: Jeremy Simpson

15 December 2015 21	Derby County	4–0	Bristol City	Derby
19:45 GMT	Ince 42', 63', 71'; Russell 76'	Report		Stadium: Pride Park Stadium; Attendance: 27,781; Referee: Andy Woolmer

19 December 2015 22	Bristol City	1–1	Queens Park Rangers	Bristol
15:00 GMT	Wilbraham 80'	Report	56' Junior Hoilett	Stadium: Ashton Gate Stadium; Attendance: 15,754; Referee: Mark Haywood

26 December 2015 23	Bristol City	1–1	Charlton Athletic	Bristol
15:00 GMT	Baker 45'	Report	90' Lennon	Stadium: Ashton Gate Stadium; Attendance: 15,285; Referee: Oliver Langford

28 December 2015 24	Burnley	4–0	Bristol City	Burnley
15:00 GMT	Gray 37', 45', 78'; Arfield 71'	Report		Stadium: Turf Moor; Attendance: 17,234; Referee: Andy Madley

2 January 2016 25	Reading	1–0	Bristol City	Reading
15:00 GMT	Blackman 90'	Report		Stadium: Madjeski Stadium; Attendance: 19,677; Referee: Darren Hadley

12 January 2016 26	Bristol City	1–2	Preston North End	Bristol
19:45 GMT	Wilbraham 56'	Report	54' (og) Baker; 80' Cunningham	Stadium: Ashton Gate Stadium; Attendance: 14,586; Referee: James Lingington

16 January 2016 27	Bristol City	1–0	Middlesbrough	Bristol
15:00 GMT	Burns 90'	Report		Stadium: Ashton Gate Stadium; Attendance: 15,670; Referee: Carl Boyeson

23 January 2016 28	Leeds United	1–0	Bristol City	Leeds
15:00 GMT	Doukara 59'	Report		Stadium: Elland Road; Attendance: 20,441; Referee: Charles Breakspear

30 January 2016 29	Bristol City	0–0	Birmingham City	Bristol
15:00 GMT		Report		Stadium: Ashton Gate Stadium; Attendance: 15,728; Referee: Robert Lewis

6 February 2016 30	Charlton Athletic	0–1	Bristol City	London
15:00 GMT		Report	21' (pen) Tomlin	Stadium: The Valley; Attendance: 14,342; Referee: Mike Jones

13 February 2016 31	Bristol City	2–1	Ipswich Town	Bristol
15:00 GMT	Flint 20', 35'	Report	61' Pitman	Stadium: Ashton Gate Stadium; Attendance: 15,736; Referee: Tony Harrington

20 February 2016 32	Milton Keynes Dons	0–2	Bristol City	Milton Keynes
15:00 GMT		Report	45+1', 60' Kodjia	Stadium: Stadium:mk; Attendance: 12,825; Referee: Keith Hill

23 February 2016 33	Bristol City	0–4	Brighton & Hove Albion	Bristol
19:45 GMT		Report	8' Murphy; 21' Baldock; 56' Hemed; 75' (og) Little	Stadium: Ashton Gate Stadium; Attendance: 15,256; Referee: David Coote

27 February 2016 34	Nottingham Forest	1–2	Bristol City	West Bridgford
15:00 GMT	Osborn 30'	Report	41' Kodjia; 70' Flint	Stadium: City Ground; Attendance: 20,551; Referee: David Webb

5 March 2016 35	Bristol City	0–2	Cardiff City	Bristol
12:00 GMT		Report	21' Immers; 83' O'Keefe	Stadium: Ashton Gate Stadium; Attendance: 15,758; Referee: Graham Scott

8 March 2016 36	Wolverhampton Wanderers	2–1	Bristol City	Wolverhampton
19:45 GMT	Byrne 47'; Doherty 90+4'	Report	77' Flint	Stadium: Molineux Stadium; Attendance: 17,459; Referee: Scott Duncan

12 March 2016 37	Fulham	1–2	Bristol City	London
15:00 GMT	McCormack 3'	Report	69' Pack; 90' Tomlin	Stadium: Craven Cottage; Attendance: 20,316; Referee: Phil Gibbs

19 March 2016 38	Bristol City	6–0	Bolton Wanderers	Bristol
15:00 GMT	Wilbraham 3'; Tomlin 10'; Odemwingige 53'; Wagstaff 79'; Kodjia 86', 87'	Report		Stadium: Ashton Gate Stadium; Attendance: 15,608; Referee: James Adcock

2 April 2016 39	Hull City	4–0	Bristol City	Kingston upon Hull
15:00 BST	Davies 14'; Snodgrass 39'; Diamé 71'; Aluko 80'	Report		Stadium: KC Stadium; Attendance: 16,521; Referee: Stuart Atwell

5 April 2016 40	Bristol City	1–1	Rotherham United	Bristol
19:45 BST	Odemwingie 54'	Report	12' Derbyshire	Stadium: Ashton Gate Stadium; Attendance: 15,248; Referee: Gavin Ward

9 April 2016 41	Bristol City	4–1	Sheffield Wednesday	Bristol
15:00 BST	Palmer 10' (og); Reid 13'; Tomlin 42' (pen.); Kodjia 52' (pen)	Report	61' (og) O'Donnell	Stadium: Ashton Gate Stadium; Attendance: 15,854; Referee: Charles Breakspear

16 April 2016 42	Brentford	1–1	Bristol City	London
15:00 BST	Hogan 90+1'	Report	45' Tomlin	Stadium: Griffin Park; Attendance: 12,071; Referee: Darren Handley

19 April 2016 43	Bristol City	2–3	Derby County	Bristol
19:45 BST	Kodjia 38'; Reid 44'	Report	Russell 37'; Bryson 52'; Ince 57'	Stadium: Ashton Gate; Attendance: 15,341; Referee: Andy Davies

23 April 2016 44	Blackburn Rovers	2–2	Bristol City	Blackburn
15:00 BST	Graham 17', 80'	Report	70' Kodjia; 74' Wilbraham; (red card) 86' Smith	Stadium: Ewood Park; Attendance: 12,752; Referee: Tim Robinson

30 April 2016 45	Bristol City	4–0	Huddersfield Town	Bristol
15:00 BST	Kodjia 45', 67'; Bryan 64'; Tomlin 77'	Report		Stadium: Ashton Gate Stadium; Attendance: 15,791; Referee: Fred Graham

7 May 2016 46	Queens Park Rangers	1–0	Bristol City	London
12:30 BST	Henry 63'	Report		Stadium: Loftus Road; Attendance: 16,679; Referee: Jeremy Simpson

=== FA Cup ===
9 January 2016 Round 3	West Bromwich Albion	2–2	Bristol City	West Bromwich
15:00 GMT	Berahino 67'; Morrison 90'	Report	74' Kodjia; 83' Agard	Stadium: The Hawthorns; Attendance: 24,917; Referee: Graham Scott

19 January 2016 Round 3 Replay	Bristol City	0–1	West Bromwich Albion	Bristol
19:45 GMT		Report	52' Rondón	Stadium: Ashton Gate Stadium; Attendance: 15,185; Referee: Jon Moss

=== League Cup ===
11 August 2015 First round	Luton Town	3–1	Bristol City	Luton
19:45 BST	Marriott 44', 63'; Benson 59'	BBC Report	71' Robinson	Stadium: Kenilworth Road; Attendance: 3,948; Referee: James Linington

== Overall summary ==
=== Summary ===
Games played	49 (46 Championship, 2 FA Cup, 1 League Cup)
Games won	13 (13 Championship, 0 FA Cup, 0 League Cup)
Games drawn	14 (13 Championship, 1 FA Cup, 0 League Cup)
Games lost	22 (20 Championship, 1 FA Cup, 1 League Cup)
Goals scored	57 (54 Championship, 2 FA Cup, 1 League Cup)
Goals conceded	78 (70 Championship, 3 FA Cup, 3 League Cup)
Goal difference	-22
Clean sheets	11 (11 Championship, 0 FA Cup, 0 League Cup)
Yellow cards	66 (64 Championship, 2 FA Cup, 0 League Cup)
Red cards	3 (3 Championship, 0 FA Cup, 0 League Cup)
Worst Discipline	Nathan Baker (9 (yellow card) , 1 (red card)
Best result	6–0 vs Bolton Wanderers (19 Mar 16)
Worst result	0–4 vs Derby County (15 Dec 15); 0–4 vs Burnley (28 Dec 15); 0–4 vs Brighton (24 Feb 15); 0–4 vs Hull City (2 Apr 16)
Most appearances	Aden Flint (45)
Top scorer	Jonathan Kodjia (20)
Points	52

=== Score overview ===
Opposition	Home score	Away score	Double
Birmingham City	0–0	2–4	No
Blackburn Rovers	0–2	2–2	No
Bolton Wanderers	6–0	0–0	No
Brentford	2–4	1–1	No
Brighton & Hove Albion	0–4	1–2	No
Burnley	1–2	0–4	No
Cardiff City	0–2	0–0	No
Charlton Athletic	1–1	1–0	No
Derby County	0–4	2–3	No
Fulham	1–4	2–1	No
Huddersfield Town	4–0	2–0	Yes
Hull City	1–1	0–4	No
Ipswich Town	2–1	2–2	No
Leeds United	2–2	0–1	No
Middlesbrough	1–0	1–0	Yes
Milton Keynes Dons	1–1	2–0	No
Nottingham Forest	2–0	2–1	Yes
Preston North End	1–2	1–1	No
Queens Park Rangers	1–1	0–1	No
Reading	0–2	0–1	No
Rotherham United	1–1	0–3	No
Sheffield Wednesday	4–1	0–2	No
Wolverhampton Wanderers	1–0	1–2	No

=== Results by matchday ===
Matchday	1	2	3	4	5	6	7	8	9	10	11	12	13	14	15	16	17	18	19	20	21	22	23	24	25	26	27	28	29	30	31	32	33	34	35	36	37	38	39	40	41	42	43	44	45	46
Ground	A	H	H	A	H	A	A	H	A	H	H	A	A	H	H	A	H	A	H	A	A	H	H	A	A	H	H	A	H	A	H	A	H	A	H	A	AA	H	A	H	H	A	H	A	H	A
Result	L	L	D	W	L	L	D	L	D	D	W	L	D	L	W	D	D	L	L	W	L	D	D	L	L	L	W	L	D	W	W	W	L	W	L	L	W	W	L	D	W	D	L	D	W	L
Position	21	23	22	18	20	21	22	23	24	24	19	21	20	21	21	20	19	20	21	19	21	20	22	22	22	22	22	22	22	20	21	20	20	19	20	20	19	19	19	20	19	17	21	20	18	18

Source: Statto.com
A = Away; H = Home; W = Win; D = Draw; L = Loss
