= Oscar Kelly =

English-Northern Irish footballer (born 2007)

Personal information
- Date of birth: 5 February 2007 (age 19)
- Positions: Forward; midfielder

Youth career
- Rochdale

College career
Years	Team	Apps	(Gls)
2025–	USC Upstate Spartans	18	(4)

Senior career*
Years	Team	Apps	(Gls)
2022–2025	Rochdale	1	(0)

International career^{‡}
2022	Northern Ireland U16	4	(2)
2022–2024	Northern Ireland U17	9	(0)
- * Club domestic league appearances and goals as of 17:10, 7 June 2026 (UTC) ‡ National team caps and goals as of 17:10, 7 June 2026 (UTC)

Oscar Kelly (born 5 February 2007) is a professional footballer who last played as a forward for Rochdale.

== Club career ==
Kelly made his professional debut for Rochdale in a 2–0 FA Cup loss to Bristol Rovers on 5 November 2022, coming on as a substitute for Devante Rodney. In doing so, he became the third youngest player in Rochdale history, behind Peter Thomas and Kevin dos Santos.

== International career ==
He was called up to the Northern Ireland under-16 squad for a mini tournament in October 2022, playing against Finland and Estonia, scoring against both. He was called up again for the Victory Shield. He has also represented Northern Ireland at under-17 level.

== Career statistics ==
As of 21 February 2023.

Appearances and goals by club, season and competition
Club	Season	League			FA Cup		EFL Cup		Other		Total	
Club	Season	Division	Apps	Goals	Apps	Goals	Apps	Goals	Apps	Goals	Apps	Goals
Rochdale	2022–23	League Two	1	0	1	0	0	0	0	0	2	0
Rochdale	2023–24	National League	0	0	0	0	–		0	0	0	0
Rochdale	2024–25	National League	0	0	0	0	–		2 (Note: Appearances in the National League Cup)	0	2	0
Career total			1	0	1	0	0	0	2	0	4	0
