= Ethan Brierley =

English footballer (born 2003)

Personal information
- Full name: Ethan Craig Brierley
- Date of birth: 23 November 2003 (age 22)
- Place of birth: Rochdale, England
- Height: 1.74 m (5 ft 9 in)
- Position: Midfielder

Team information
- Current team: Huddersfield Town
- Number: 14

Youth career
- 2010–2020: Rochdale

Senior career*
Years	Team	Apps	(Gls)
2020–2023	Rochdale	32	(2)
2022	→ Spennymoor Town (loan)	7	(1)
2023–2026	Brentford	0	(0)
2025–2026	→ Exeter City (loan)	42	(1)
2026–	Huddersfield Town	0	(0)
- * Club domestic league appearances and goals as of 28 April 2026 (UTC)

Ethan Craig Brierley (born 23 November 2003) is an English professional footballer who plays as a midfielder for EFL League One club Huddersfield Town.

== Early life ==
Brierley was born in Rochdale. He attended Oulder Hill Community School in Rochdale. Brierley was a childhood Rochdale supporter, having attended matches from the age of three onwards and he also supports Manchester City.

== Career ==
Brierley started playing junior football for local team Roach Dynamos in Heywood.

=== Rochdale ===
After trials at the academies of Blackburn Rovers and Manchester City, Brierley joined Rochdale's academy aged seven. Brierley was named on Rochdale's bench for a FA Cup match against Newcastle United in January 2020, at the age of 15. Because of his age, Brierley had to get changed separately to the rest of Rochdale's first team. He made his professional debut for Rochdale on 5 September 2020 in a 1–0 EFL Cup victory away to Huddersfield Town. He signed his first professional contract with the club on 26 November 2020, having turned 17 earlier that week. He made his league debut as a late substitute in a 2–0 defeat away to Ipswich Town on 26 September 2020, and made a further four league appearances across the 2020–21 season as Rochdale were relegated to EFL League Two after finishing 21st.

==== Spennymoor Town (loan) ====
Having made just three cup appearances for Rochdale during the 2021–22 season, Brierley joined National League North side Spennymoor Town on loan for the remainder of the season on 24 March 2022. On 29 April 2022, Brierley was recalled from this loan spell by parent club Rochdale, and started Rochdale's final two matches of the season. He was nominated for the LFE League Two Apprentice of the Season award, but lost out to Junior Tchamadeu of Colchester United.

=== Return to Rochdale ===
In July 2022, Brierley agreed an extension to his contract with Rochdale until summer 2024. He scored his first senior goal for the club in a 3–3 EFL Trophy draw away to Accrington Stanley on 30 August 2022. In January 2023, Brierley spent time on trial at both Sheffield United and Blackburn Rovers. Brierley was unable to sign for Sheffield United due to the club being under a transfer embargo, whilst a deadline day transfer to Blackburn fell through after the English Football League rejected their application to register the player. Blackburn appealed this decision unsuccessfully, and Brierley returned to first-team action for Rochdale in late February. With Rochdale embroiled in a relegation battle, Brierley registered three assists in his first four games back as Dale picked up five points. However, Rochdale were eventually relegated after finishing bottom on 38 points, with Brierley having made 25 league appearances.

=== Brentford ===
On 2 June 2023, it was confirmed that Brierley had signed for Brentford for an undisclosed fee on a three-year deal.

==== Exeter City (loan) ====
On 26 June 2025, Brentford announced the player had signed a one-year loan deal with Exeter.

== Career statistics ==
As of end of 2025–26 season

Appearances and goals by club, season and competition
Club	Season	League			FA Cup		League Cup		Other		Total	
Club	Season	Division	Apps	Goals	Apps	Goals	Apps	Goals	Apps	Goals	Apps	Goals
Rochdale	2020–21	League One	5	0	0	0	1	0	3 (Note: Appearances in EFL Trophy)	0	9	0
Rochdale	2021–22	League Two	2	0	0	0	1	0	2	0	5	0
Rochdale	2022–23	League Two	25	2	1	0	2	0	3	1	31	3
Rochdale	Total		32	2	1	0	4	0	8	1	45	3
Spennymoor Town (loan)	2021–22	National League North	7	1	0	0	0	0	0	0	7	1
Brentford	2023–24	Premier League	0	0	0	0	1	0	0	0	1	0
Brentford	2024–25	Premier League	0	0	0	0	0	0	0	0	0	0
Brentford	2025–26	Premier League	0	0	0	0	0	0	0	0	0	0
Brentford	Total		0	0	0	0	1	0	0	0	1	0
Exeter City (loan)	2025–26	League One	42	1	3	0	0	0	2	0	47	1
Career total			81	4	4	0	5	0	10	1	100	5
