= 2022–23 Rochdale A.F.C. season =

English football club season

Rochdale AFC
2022–23 season
- Chairman: Simon Gauge
- Manager: Robbie Stockdale (until 18 August); Jim Bentley (until 27 March); Jimmy McNulty (from 27 March)
- Stadium: Spotland Stadium
- League Two: 24th (relegated to National League)
- FA Cup: First round
- EFL Cup: Second round
- EFL Trophy: Group stage
- Top goalscorer: League: Devante Rodney (11); All: Devante Rodney (12)
Home colours	Away colours

The 2022–23 season was Rochdale A.F.C.'s 116th in existence and the club's second consecutive season in League Two. In addition to the league, the club also competed in the 2022–23 FA Cup, the 2022–23 EFL Cup and the 2022–23 EFL Trophy.

== Statistics ==
=== Appearances and goals ===
As of 8 May 2023

No.	Pos	Nat	Player	Total		League Two		F.A. Cup		League Cup		League Trophy	
No.	Pos	Nat	Player	Apps	Goals	Apps	Goals	Apps	Goals	Apps	Goals	Apps	Goals
1	GK	(England) ENG	Richard O'Donnell	44	0	40+0	0	1+0	0	0+1	0	2+0	0
2	DF	(England) ENG	Femi Seriki	35	0	20+9	0	0+1	0	2+0	0	2+1	0
3	DF	(Republic of Ireland) IRL	Aidy White	15	0	9+3	0	0+0	0	1+0	0	2+0	0
4	DF	(Scotland) SCO	Jimmy McNulty	10	0	5+3	0	0+0	0	0+0	0	2+0	0
5	DF	(England) ENG	Max Taylor	20	1	19+0	1	0+0	0	0+0	0	0+1	0
6	DF	(England) ENG	Ethan Ebanks-Landell	42	1	37+2	1	1+0	0	2+0	0	0+0	0
7	MF	(England) ENG	Liam Kelly	39	2	28+6	1	1+0	0	1+0	0	1+2	1
8	MF	(England) ENG	Jimmy Ball	36	4	22+10	2	1+0	0	2+0	1	1+0	1
~~9~~	FW	(England) ENG	Luke Charman	1	0	0+1	0	0+0	0	0+0	0	0+0	0
9	FW	(England) ENG	D'Mani Mellor	19	0	12+7	0	0+0	0	0+0	0	0+0	0
10	FW	(England) ENG	Devante Rodney	45	12	31+9	11	1+0	0	2+0	1	1+1	0
11	MF	(England) ENG	Abraham Odoh	51	1	32+13	1	1+0	0	1+1	0	2+1	0
13	MF	(Republic of Ireland) IRL	Jimmy Keohane	42	3	37+2	3	1+0	0	0+0	0	2+0	0
14	MF	(England) ENG	Ethan Brierley	31	3	18+7	2	0+1	0	0+2	0	3+0	1
15	DF	(England) ENG	Sam Graham	33	0	21+8	0	1+0	0	1+0	0	2+0	0
~~16~~	DF	(England) ENG	Ben Nelson	12	0	7+3	0	0+0	0	1+0	0	1+0	0
16	DF	(England) ENG	Rhys Bennett	5	0	4+1	0	0+0	0	0+0	0	0+0	0
17	MF	(England) ENG	Tyrese Sinclair	38	3	11+21	3	0+1	0	1+1	0	2+1	0
18	FW	(England) ENG	Scott Quigley	27	5	20+6	5	0+0	0	0+0	0	0+1	0
19	FW	(England) ENG	Tahvon Campbell	8	1	0+7	0	0+0	0	0+0	0	0+1	1
20	MF	(France) FRA	Toumani Diagouraga	37	0	26+5	0	1+0	0	2+0	0	1+2	0
~~21~~	FW	(England) ENG	Rayhaan Tulloch	14	0	2+7	0	0+0	0	1+1	0	2+1	0
21	GK	(England) ENG	Jake Eastwood	7	0	6+1	0	0+0	0	0+0	0	0+0	0
~~22~~	GK	(England) ENG	Cieran Slicker	3	0	0+0	0	0+0	0	2+0	0	1+0	0
22	DF	(England) ENG	Owen Dodgson	18	1	18+0	1	0+0	0	0+0	0	0+0	0
24	DF	(England) ENG	Cameron John	22	0	16+2	0	1+0	0	2+0	0	1+0	0
25	MF	(England) ENG	Danny Lloyd	23	6	20+3	6	0+0	0	0+0	0	0+0	0
26	DF	(England) ENG	Toby Mullarkey	12	0	11+1	0	0+0	0	0+0	0	0+0	0
~~27~~	MF	(England) ENG	Connor Malley	14	0	2+7	0	0+1	0	0+1	0	3+0	0
28	MF	(England) ENG	Kevin Dos Santos	1	0	0+0	0	0+0	0	0+0	0	0+1	0
33	MF	(England) ENG	Oscar Kelly	2	0	0+1	0	0+1	0	0+0	0	0+0	0
40	FW	(England) ENG	Ian Henderson	50	10	31+13	8	1+0	0	1+1	0	2+1	2
48	FW	(England) ENG	Darren Ehimamiegho	1	0	0+1	0	0+0	0	0+0	0	0+0	0
49	DF	(Wales) WAL	George Nevett	1	0	0+1	0	0+0	0	0+0	0	0+0	0

=== Goals record ===
As of 8 May 2023

Rank	No.	Nat.	Po.	Name	League Two	FA Cup	League Cup	League Trophy	Total
1	10	(England)	FW	Devante Rodney	11	0	1	0	12
2	40	(England)	FW	Ian Henderson	8	0	0	2	10
3	25	(England)	MF	Danny Lloyd	6	0	0	0	6
4	18	(England)	FW	Scott Quigley	5	0	0	0	5
5	8	(England)	MF	Jimmy Ball	2	0	1	1	4
6	17	(England)	MF	Tyrese Sinclair	3	0	0	0	3
6	13	(Republic of Ireland)	MF	Jimmy Keohane	3	0	0	0	3
6	14	(England)	MF	Ethan Brierley	2	0	0	1	3
9	7	(England)	FW	Liam Kelly	1	0	0	1	2
10	19	(England)	FW	Tahvon Campbell	0	0	0	1	1
10	11	(England)	MF	Abraham Odoh	1	0	0	0	1
10	5	(England)	DF	Max Taylor	1	0	0	0	1
10	22	(England)	DF	Owen Dodgson	1	0	0	0	1
Total					44	0	2	6	52

=== Disciplinary record ===
As of 17 April 2023

Rank	No.	Nat.	Po.	Name	League Two			FA Cup			League Cup			League Trophy			Total		
Rank	No.	Nat.	Po.	Name	Yellow card	(yellow card) (yellow-red card)	Red card	Yellow card	(yellow card) (yellow-red card)	Red card	Yellow card	(yellow card) (yellow-red card)	Red card	Yellow card	(yellow card) (yellow-red card)	Red card	Yellow card	(yellow card) (yellow-red card)	Red card
1	11	(England)	MF	Abraham Odoh	9	0	0	1	0	0	0	0	0	1	0	0	11	0	0
2	6	(England)	DF	Ethan Ebanks-Landell	8	0	1	0	0	0	0	0	0	0	0	0	8	0	1
3	8	(England)	MF	Jimmy Ball	6	0	0	0	0	0	0	0	0	0	0	0	6	0	0
3	20	(France)	MF	Toumani Diagouraga	5	0	0	0	0	0	1	0	0	0	0	0	6	0	0
3	2	(England)	DF	Fermi Seriki	5	0	0	0	0	0	1	0	0	0	0	0	6	0	0
3	18	(England)	FW	Scott Quigley	6	0	0	0	0	0	0	0	0	0	0	0	6	0	0
7	10	(England)	FW	Devante Rodney	4	0	0	0	0	0	1	0	0	0	0	0	5	0	0
7	15	(England)	DF	Sam Graham	2	1	0	0	0	0	0	0	0	2	0	0	4	1	0
9	1	(England)	GK	Richard O'Donnell	4	0	0	0	0	0	0	0	0	0	0	0	4	0	0
10	16	(England)	DF	Ben Nelson	3	0	0	0	0	0	0	0	0	0	0	0	3	0	0
10	25	(England)	MF	Danny Lloyd	3	0	0	0	0	0	0	0	0	0	0	0	3	0	0
10	24	(England)	DF	Cameron John	2	0	0	1	0	0	0	0	0	0	0	0	3	0	0
10	14	(England)	MF	Ethan Brierley	3	0	0	0	0	0	0	0	0	0	0	0	3	0	0
10	22	(England)	DF	Owen Dodgson	3	0	0	0	0	0	0	0	0	0	0	0	3	0	0
15	40	(England)	FW	Ian Henderson	2	0	0	0	0	0	0	0	0	0	0	0	2	0	0
15	17	(England)	MF	Tyrese Sinclair	2	0	0	0	0	0	0	0	0	0	0	0	2	0	0
15	13	(Republic of Ireland)	MF	Jimmy Keohane	2	0	0	0	0	0	0	0	0	0	0	0	2	0	0
15	26	(England)	DF	Toby Mullarkey	2	0	0	0	0	0	0	0	0	0	0	0	2	0	0
15	7	(England)	FW	Liam Kelly	2	0	0	0	0	0	0	0	0	0	0	0	2	0	0
20	21	(England)	FW	Rayhaan Tulloch	1	0	0	0	0	0	0	0	0	0	0	0	1	0	0
20	5	(England)	DF	Max Taylor	1	0	0	0	0	0	0	0	0	0	0	0	1	0	0
20	19	(England)	FW	Tahvon Campbell	1	0	0	0	0	0	0	0	0	0	0	0	1	0	0
20	9	(England)	FW	D'Mani Mellor	1	0	0	0	0	0	0	0	0	0	0	0	1	0	0
Total					77	1	1	2	0	0	3	0	0	3	0	0	85	1	1

== Transfers ==
=== In ===
Date	Pos	Player	Transferred from	Fee	Ref
15 June 2022	RW	(England) Devante Rodney	(England) Walsall	Undisclosed	
1 July 2022 (Note: The transfer was announced on 13 June, and would become official on July 1, once his Morecambe contract expired)	DM	(France) Toumani Diagouraga	(England) Morecambe	Free Transfer	
1 July 2022 (Note: The transfer was announced on 13 June, and would become official on July 1, once his Shrewsbury Town contract expired)	CB	(England) Ethan Ebanks-Landell	(England) Shrewsbury Town	Free Transfer	
1 July 2022 (Note: The transfer was announced on 28 June, and would become official on July 1, once his Doncaster Rovers contract expired)	LB	(England) Cameron John	(England) Doncaster Rovers	Free Transfer	
1 July 2022 (Note: The transfer was announced on 18 May, and would become official on July 1, once his Bradford City contract expired)	GK	(England) Richard O'Donnell	(England) Bradford City	Free Transfer	
12 July 2022	CF	(England) Ian Henderson	(England) Salford City	Free Transfer	
19 July 2022	AM	(England) Tyrese Sinclair	(England) Mansfield Town	Free Transfer	
15 August 2022	CM	(England) Connor Malley	(England) Middlesbrough	Free Transfer	
9 December 2022	RW	(England) Danny Lloyd	(England) Gillingham	Free Transfer	
28 January 2023	CB	(England) Rhys Bennett	(England) Morecambe	Free Transfer	
31 January 2023	CB	(England) Toby Mullarkey	(England) Altrincham	Undisclosed	

=== Out ===
Date	Pos	Player	Transferred to	Fee	Ref
24 June 2022	CM	(Republic of Ireland) Conor Grant	(England) Milton Keynes Dons	Undisclosed	
30 June 2022	DF	(England) Mikey Caldwell	(England) Glossop North End	Released	
30 June 2022 (Note: The transfer was announced on 16 June, and would become official on July 1, once his contract expired)	LB	(England) Max Clark	(England) Stevenage	Free transfer	
30 June 2022	GK	(England) Joel Coleman	(England) Ipswich Town	Released	
30 June 2022	LB	(England) Matt Done	Retired	—N/a	
30 June 2022 (Note: The transfer was announced on 14 June, and would become official on July 1, once his contract expired)	LM	(Northern Ireland) Stephen Dooley	(England) Harrogate Town	Free transfer	
30 June 2022	CB	(England) Joe Dunne	(England) Stafford Rangers	Released	
30 June 2022	MF	(England) Ben Kershaw	(England) Stoke City	Released	
30 June 2022	DF	(England) Jesper Laurence	Unattached	Released	
30 June 2022	GK	(England) Jay Lynch	(England) Fleetwood Town	Released	
30 June 2022	DM	(Poland) Kacper Mialkowski	(England) Glossop North End	Released	
30 June 2022	RW	(England) Alex Newby	(England) Colchester United	Released	
30 June 2022 (Note: The transfer was announced on 20 June, and would become official on July 1, once his contract expired)	CB	(Republic of Ireland) Eoghan O'Connell	(England) Charlton Athletic	Free transfer	
30 June 2022 (Note: The transfer was announced on 7 June, and would become official on 1 July, once his contract expired)	RB	(Republic of Ireland) Corey O'Keeffe	(England) Forest Green Rovers	Free transfer	
30 June 2022	GK	(England) Bradley Wade	(England) Hereford	Released	
14 October 2022	CF	(England) Luke Charman	(England) AFC Fylde	Undisclosed	
3 January 2023	CM	(England) Connor Malley	(Republic of Ireland) Dundalk	Released	

=== Loans in ===
Date	Pos	Player	Loaned from	On loan until	Ref
15 July 2022	RB	(England) Femi Seriki	(England) Sheffield United	End of Season	
28 July 2022	CB	(Scotland) Ben Nelson	(England) Leicester City	6 January 2023 (Note: On 6 January, Nelson's loan from Leicester was cut short)	
29 July 2022	GK	(Scotland) Cieran Slicker	(England) Manchester City	11 January 2023 (Note: On 11 January, Slicker's loan from Man City was cut short)	
8 August 2022	SS	(England) Rayhaan Tulloch	(England) West Bromwich Albion	6 January 2023 (Note: On 6 January, Tulloch's loan from West Brom was cut short)	
1 September 2022	CF	(England) Scott Quigley	(England) Stockport County	End of Season	
12 January 2023	GK	(England) Jake Eastwood	(England) Sheffield United	End of Season	
27 January 2023	LB	(England) Owen Dodgson	(England) Burnley	End of Season	
27 January 2023	CF	(England) D'Mani Mellor	(England) Wycombe Wanderers	End of Season	
31 January 2023	CM	(England) Daniel Adshead	(England) Cheltenham Town	End of Season	

=== Loans out ===
Date	Pos	Player	Loaned to	On loan until	Ref
15 October 2022	MF	(England) Jordan Scanlon	(England) Ashton United	15 November 2022	
21 January 2023	GK	(England) Bradley Kelly	(Wales) Airbus UK Broughton	End of Season	
18 February 2023	MF	(England) Jordan Scanlon	(England) Ramsbottom United	18 March 2023	
3 March 2023	CF	(England) Tahvon Campbell	(England) Aldershot Town	End of Season	

== Pre-season and friendlies ==
Rochdale revealed an away pre-season trip to Scunthorpe United on 20 May 2022. Four days later, an away trip to Chester was added to the pre-season schedule. The club confirmed a visit to Darlington on 25 May. On June 1, a home friendly against Port Vale was added to the schedule.

Win Draw Loss Fixtures

1 July 2022 Friendly	Burnley	1–0	Rochdale	Padiham
TBA BST	Twine 13'	Report		Stadium: Barnfield Training Centre; Attendance: 0 (behind-closed-doors)

9 July 2022 Friendly	Chester	0–1	Rochdale	Sealand
15:00 BST		Report	Rodney 55'	Stadium: Deva Stadium

12 July 2022 Friendly	Rochdale	2–3	Chesterfield	Bury
14:00 BST	Trialist 14'; Trailist 16'	Report	Mandeville 32'; Dobra 59'; Asante 76' (pen.)	Stadium: Gigg Lane; Attendance: 0 (behind-closed-doors)

16 July 2022 Friendly	Darlington	1–2	Rochdale	Darlington
15:00 BST	Hazel 12'	Report	Rodney 14'; Henderson (?)	Stadium: Blackwell Meadows

19 July 2022 Friendly	Scunthorpe United	1–4	Rochdale	Scunthorpe
19:30 BST	Feeney 63'	Report	Kelly 63'; Sinclair 60', 68'; Odoh 84'	Stadium: Sands Venue Stadium

23 July 2022 Friendly	Rochdale	2–3	Port Vale	Rochdale
15:00 BST	Keohane 11'; Henderson 16'	Report	Proctor 18' (pen.), 53'; Ojo 57'	Stadium: Crown Oil Arena

== Competitions ==
=== Overall record ===
Competition	First match	Last match	Starting round	Record							
Competition	First match	Last match	Starting round	Pld	W	D	L	GF	GA	GD	Win %
League Two	August 2022	May 2023	Matchday 1	0	0	0	0	0	0	+0	—
FA Cup	TBC	TBC	Third round	0	0	0	0	0	0	+0	—
EFL Cup	TBC	TBC	First round	0	0	0	0	0	0	+0	—
EFL Trophy	TBC	TBC	Group stage	0	0	0	0	0	0	+0	—
Total				0	0	0	0	0	0	+0	—

Last updated: pre-season
Source: [ Soccerway]

=== League Two ===
==== League table ====
Pos	Team	Pld	W	D	L	GF	GA	GD	Pts	Promotion, qualification or relegation
19	Harrogate Town	46	12	16	18	59	68	−9	52	
20	Colchester United	46	12	13	21	44	51	−7	49	
21	AFC Wimbledon	46	11	15	20	48	60	−12	48	
22	Crawley Town	46	11	13	22	48	71	−23	46	
23	Hartlepool United (R)	46	9	16	21	52	78	−26	43	Relegation to National League
24	Rochdale (R)	46	9	11	26	46	70	−24	38	Relegation to National League

Source: EFL Official Website
Rules for classification: 1) Points; 2) Goal difference; 3) Number of goals scored; 4) Head-to-head results; 5) Wins; 6) Away goals; 7) Penalty points (sec 9.5); 8) 12-point sending off offences
(R) Relegated

==== Results summary ====
Overall								Home						Away					
Pld	W	D	L	GF	GA	GD	Pts	W	D	L	GF	GA	GD	W	D	L	GF	GA	GD
46	9	11	26	46	70	−24	38	5	5	13	29	38	−9	4	6	13	17	32	−15

Last updated: 8 May 2023.

==== Results by round ====
Round	1	2	3	4	5	6	7	8	9	10	11	12	13	14	15	16	17	18	19	20	21	22	23	24	25	26	27	28	29	30	31	32	33	34	35	36	37	38	39	40	41	42	43	44	45	46
Ground	H	A	H	A	A	H	A	H	A	A	H	A	H	H	A	A	H	H	A	H	H	A	A	H	A	H	A	H	A	H	A	H	H	A	H	A	H	A	A	H	A	H	H	A	H	A
Result/	L	L	L	L	L	D	D	L	L	W	L	W	W	L	D	L	W	L	L	L	L	L	D	D	W	L	L	L	L	D	L	L	L	D	W	L	D	L	W	W	D	L	D	L	W	D
Position	17	22	24	24	24	24	24	24	24	23	24	23	21	22	22	22	19	20	21	21	23	23	23	23	22	22	24	24	24	24	24	24	24	24	24	24	24	24	24	24	24	24	24	24	24	24

Updated to match(es) played on 8 May 2023. Source: [ Soccerway]
A = Away; H = Home; W = Win; D = Draw; L = Loss; P = Postponed

==== Matches ====
Win Draw Loss Fixtures

On 23 June, the league fixtures were announced.

30 July 2022 1	Rochdale	1–2	Crewe Alexandra	Rochdale
15:00 BST	Ebanks-Landell (yellow card) 13'; Ball (yellow card) 51'; Rodney 69'	Report	Williams (yellow card) 10'; Agyei 14'; Brook 22'; Offord (yellow card) 60'	Stadium: Crown Oil Arena; Attendance: 3,648; Referee: Andrew Kitchen

6 August 2022 2	Gillingham	1–0	Rochdale	Gillingham
15:00 BST	Kashket 9'; Ehmer (yellow card) 21'; Wright (yellow card) 39'; Law (yellow card) 88'	Report	Odoh (yellow card) 88'	Stadium: Priestfield Stadium; Attendance: 4,233; Referee: Will Finnie

13 August 2022 3	Rochdale	0–1	Grimsby Town	Rochdale
15:00 BST	Ebanks-Landell (yellow card) 37'; Seriki (yellow card) 46'; Nelson (yellow card) 49'; Tulloch (yellow card) 60'	Report	Clifton (yellow card) 29'; Morris (yellow card) 45+3'; Waterfall 90+2'	Stadium: Crown Oil Arena; Attendance: 3,350; Referee: Thomas Kirk

16 August 2022 4	Stevenage	1–0	Rochdale	Stevenage
19:45 BST	Roberts (yellow card) 35'; Piergianni 41'	Report	Diagouraga (yellow card) 46'; Ball (yellow card) 66'; Seriki (yellow card) 81'	Stadium: Lamex Stadium; Attendance: 2,720; Referee: Tom Reeves

20 August 2022 5	Swindon Town	3–0	Rochdale	Swindon
15:00 BST	Wakeling 1'; Khan (yellow card) 41'; Williams 50'; Gladwin (yellow card) 76'; McKirdy 81'	Report	Nelson (yellow card) 66'; Brierley (yellow card) 90+1'	Stadium: The County Ground; Attendance: 8,327; Referee: Sam Barrott

27 August 2022 6	Rochdale	1–1	Crawley Town	Rochdale
15:00 BST	Rodney (yellow card) 32'; Sinclair 60'; Henderson (yellow card) 84'	Report	Johnson (yellow card) 11'; Ransom (yellow card) 36'; Powell 45+2'; Tsaroulla (yellow card) 53' (yellow-red card) 86'	Stadium: Crown Oil Arena; Attendance: 2,277; Referee: Alan Young

3 September 2022 7	Carlisle United	3–3	Rochdale	Carlisle
15:00 BST	Mellish 36'; Dennis 58'; Huntington 78'	Report	Quigley 22', 53' (yellow card) 69'; Rodney 51'	Stadium: Brunton Park; Attendance: 5,023; Referee: Adam Herczeg

10 September 2022	Rochdale	Postponed	Salford City	Rochdale
15:00 BST				Stadium: Crown Oil Arena
Note: Fixture was postponed as a mark of respect following the passing of Queen Elizabeth II.

13 September 2022 8	Rochdale	0–1	Leyton Orient	Rochdale
19:45 BST	Quigley (yellow card) 34' (penalty missed); Odoh (yellow card) 68'	Report	Moncur 35'; Pratley (yellow card) 50'; El Mizouni (yellow card) 75'; Archibald (yellow card) 88'	Stadium: Crown Oil Arena; Attendance: 2,173; Referee: Simon Mather

17 September 2022 9	Northampton Town	3–0	Rochdale	Northampton
15:00 BST	Guthrie 42'; Hoskins (penalty missed) 73', 81'	Report	Ball (yellow card) 57'; Diagouraga (yellow card) 60'; Graham (yellow card) 90+1'	Stadium: Sixfields Stadium; Attendance: 4,691; Referee: Sam Purkiss

24 September 2022 10	Colchester United	0–1	Rochdale	Colchester
15:00 BST	O'Hara (yellow card) 22'; Dallison (yellow card) 51'; Sears (penalty missed)	Report	Rodney 23' (pen.); Ball (yellow card) 37'; Odoh (yellow card) 87'; Seriki (yellow card) 90+5'	Stadium: Colchester Community Stadium; Attendance: 2,784; Referee: Charles Breakspear

1 October 2022 11	Rochdale	1–2	Doncaster Rovers	Rochdale
15:00 BST	Quigley 44'	Report	Agard 39'; Miller 68'; Williams (yellow card) 89'	Stadium: Crown Oil Arena; Attendance: 3,264; Referee: Darren Drysdale

8 October 2022 12	Newport County	0–1	Rochdale	Newport
15:00 BST	Clarke (yellow card) 11'	Report	Ball 5' (yellow card) 57'; Keohane (yellow card) 60'; Quigley (yellow card) 62'; Rodney (yellow card) 90+3'; Henderson (yellow card) 90+5'	Stadium: Rodney Parade; Attendance: 3,824; Referee: David Rock

15 October 2022 13	Rochdale	2–1	Barrow	Rochdale
15:00 BST	Kelly 18'; Diagouraga (yellow card) 28'; Quigley 75'; Ball (yellow card) 90'; O'Donnell (yellow card) 90+6'	Report	Warren (yellow card) 85'; Canavan 89' (yellow card) 90+7'	Stadium: Crown Oil Arena; Attendance: 3,061; Referee: Sunny Sukhvir Gill

22 October 2022 14	Rochdale	1–2	Wimbledon	Rochdale
15:00 BST	Sinclair 66'; Ebanks-Landell (yellow card) 79'; John (yellow card)	Report	Towler (yellow card) 20'; Assal 39' (yellow card) 86'; Gunter (yellow card) 59'; Davison 64'; Woodyard (yellow card) 90+3'	Stadium: Crown Oil Arena; Attendance: 2,568; Referee: Marc Edwards

25 October 2022 15	Tranmere Rovers	1–1	Rochdale	Birkenhead
19:45 BST	Hemmings 39'; Simeu (yellow card) 90'	Report	Henderson 35'; O'Donnell (yellow card) 90+5'	Stadium: Prenton Park; Referee: Andy Haines

29 October 2022 16	Walsall	1–0	Rochdale	Walsall
15:00 BST	Evans (yellow card) 19'; White 35'; Knowles (yellow card) 81'; Bennett (yellow card) 82'	Report	Rodney (yellow card) 19'	Stadium: Bescot Stadium; Referee: Tom Nield

8 November 2022 17	Rochdale	1–0	Salford City	Rochdale
19:45 GMT	Odoh (yellow card) 61'; Henderson 80'; Brierley (yellow card)	Report	Galbraith (yellow card) 61'	Stadium: Crown Oil Arena; Attendance: 2,355; Referee: Peter Wright

12 November 2022 18	Rochdale	0–1	Mansfield Town	Rochdale
15:00 GMT	Sinclair (yellow card) 35'; Seriki (yellow card) 82'; John (yellow card) 90+6'	Report	Perch (yellow card) 52'; Maris 66'; Hartigan (yellow card) 90+5'	Stadium: Crown Oil Arena; Attendance: 3,631; Referee: Robert Lewis

19 November 2022 19	Sutton United	1–0	Rochdale	Sutton
15:00 GMT	Randall 38'	Report		Stadium: Gander Green Lane; Attendance: 2,954; Referee: Sam Allison

3 December 2022 20	Rochdale	1–4	Harrogate Town	Rochdale
15:00 GMT	Ball 7'; Brierley (yellow card) 37'; Odoh (yellow card) 81'	Report	Thomson 14'; Ferguson (yellow card) 45'; Armstrong 53', 58'; Folarin 70'	Stadium: Crown Oil Arena; Attendance: 2,254; Referee: Declan Bourne

10 December 2022	Rochdale	Postponed	Stockport County	Rochdale
15:00 GMT				Stadium: Crown Oil Arena
Note: Fixture was postponed due to a frozen pitch.

17 December 2022	Bradford City	Postponed	Rochdale	Bradford
15:00 GMT				Stadium: Valley Parade
Note: Fixture was postponed due to a frozen pitch.

26 December 2022 21	Rochdale	1–2	Hartlepool United	Rochdale
15:00 GMT	Nelson (yellow card) 44'; Henderson 60'	Report	Menayese 39'; Umerah (yellow card) 72'; Sterry (yellow card) 77'; Cooke 80'; Killip (yellow card) 90+1'	Stadium: Crown Oil Arena; Attendance: 3,243; Referee: Thomas Kirk

29 December 2022 22	Doncaster Rovers	4–3	Rochdale	Doncaster
19:45 GMT	Seaman 7'; Close 9'; Biggins 37'; Anderson 81'	Report	Rodney 14'; Williams 16' (o.g.); Ebanks-Landell (yellow card) 27'; Sinclair 77'	Stadium: Eco-Power Stadium; Attendance: 6,025; Referee: Andrew Kitchen

2 January 2023 23	Barrow	0–0	Rochdale	Barrow-in-Furness
15:00 GMT	Whitfield (yellow card) 65'	Report	Quigley (yellow card) 35'; Ball (yellow card) 77'; Sinclair (yellow card) 90+5'	Stadium: Holker Street; Attendance: 3,055; Referee: Scott Oldham

7 January 2023 24	Rochdale	1–1	Newport County	Rochdale
15:00 GMT	Rodney 34'; Ebanks-Landell (yellow card) 63'	Report	Norman (yellow card) 2'; Day (yellow card) 35'; Lewis 46' (yellow card) 78'; Drysdale (yellow card) 56'	Stadium: Crown Oil Arena; Attendance: 2,452; Referee: Andy Haines

10 January 2023 25	Bradford City	1–2	Rochdale	Bradford
19:45 GMT	Crichlow (yellow card) 12'; Eisa 29'	Report	Seriki (yellow card) 9'; Rodney (penalty missed) 63', (yellow card) 90+10'; Henderson 63', 70'; O'Donnell (yellow card) 90+9'	Stadium: University of Bradford Stadium; Attendance: 17,061; Referee: Paul Howard

14 January 2023 26	Rochdale	1–2	Colchester United	Rochdale
15:00 GMT	Rodney 36'; Diagouraga (yellow card) 90+4'	Report	Tchamadeu 26'; Jay (yellow card) 67'; Skuse 87'	Stadium: Crown Oil Arena; Attendance: 2,360; Referee: Martin Coy

21 January 2023 27	Hartlepool United	2–0	Rochdale	Hartlepool
15:00 GMT	Hartley (yellow card) 36'; Umerah 54'; Sterry (yellow card) 59'; Hamilton 64'; Pruti (yellow card) 87'	Report	Ebanks-Landell (red card) 51'; Graham (yellow card) 67' (yellow-red card) 90+1'	Stadium: Victoria Park; Attendance: 4,353; Referee: Marc Edwards

28 January 2023 28	Rochdale	0–1	Carlisle United	Rochdale
15:00 GMT	Lloyd (yellow card) 54'; Diagouraga (yellow card) 90'	Report	Gordon 8' (yellow card) 36'; Huntington (yellow card) 22'; Feeney (yellow card) 26'	Stadium: Crown Oil Arena; Attendance: 4,042; Referee: Ross Joyce

4 February 2023 29	Salford City	2–1	Rochdale	Salford
15:00 GMT	Smith 10' (yellow card) 90+11'; McAleny 63'; Watson (yellow card) 81'	Report	Quigley 81' (pen.); Taylor (yellow card) 90+6'	Stadium: Peninsula Stadium; Attendance: 3,167; Referee: Bobby Madley

11 February 2023 30	Rochdale	1–1	Northampton Town	Rochdale
15:00 GMT	Henderson 52'; Diagouraga (yellow card) 62'; Lloyd (yellow card) 80'; Quigley (yellow card) 88'	Report	Fox 89'	Stadium: Crown Oil Arena; Attendance: 2,742; Referee: Neil Hair

14 February 2023 31	Leyton Orient	2–1	Rochdale	Leyton
19:45 GMT	Sotiriou 18'; El Mizouni 29'; Kelman (yellow card) 90+5'	Report	Dodgson (yellow card) 28'; Lloyd 56'; Odoh (yellow card) 69'; Ebanks-Landell (yellow card) 83'; Campbell (yellow card) 90'	Stadium: Brisbane Road; Attendance: 6,514; Referee: Sunny Gill

18 February 2023 32	Rochdale	0–2	Gillingham	Rochdale
15:00 GMT	Keohane (yellow card) 47'; Ebanks-Landell (yellow card) 50'	Report	Hawkins 23'; Lapslie 75'	Stadium: Crown Oil Arena; Attendance: 2,742; Referee: Marc Edwards

21 February 2023 33	Rochdale	1–2	Stockport County	Rochdale
19:45 GMT	Rodney 85'; Lloyd (yellow card) 87'	Report	Knoyle (yellow card) 19'; Collar 56' (pen.), 58'	Stadium: Crown Oil Arena; Attendance: 4,604; Referee: Carl Boyeson

25 February 2023 34	Crewe Alexandra	1–1	Rochdale	Crewe
15:00 GMT	Robertson (yellow card) 11'; O'Riordan (yellow card) 14' (yellow-red card) 87'; Adebisi 70'	Report	Odoh (yellow card) 24'; Keohane 80'	Stadium: Gresty Road; Attendance: 4,387; Referee: Ben Toner

4 March 2023 35	Rochdale	2–0	Stevenage	Rochdale
15:00 GMT	Rodney 7'; Lloyd 28'	Report	Clark (yellow card) 19'; Reeves (yellow card) 59'	Stadium: Crown Oil Arena; Attendance: 2,189; Referee: Seb Stockbridge

11 March 2023 36	Grimsby Town	1–0	Rochdale	Cleethorpes
15:00 GMT	Glennon (yellow card) 14'; Lloyd 68'; Crocombe (yellow card) 77'; Maher (yellow card) 81'; Waterfall (yellow card) 90+3'	Report	Quigley (yellow card) 77'	Stadium: Blundell Park; Attendance: 5,963; Referee: James Oldham

18 March 2023 37	Rochdale	4–4	Swindon Town	Rochdale
15:00 GMT	Rodney 22'; Lloyd 25'; Dodgson (yellow card) 63'; Odoh 71'; Henderson 90+4'; Mullarkey (yellow card) 90+4'	Report	Austin 2', 14', 74', 79'; Clayton (yellow card) 90+4'	Stadium: Crown Oil Arena; Attendance: 2,611; Referee: Bobby Madden

25 March 2023 38	Crawley Town	2–0	Rochdale	Crawley
15:00 GMT	Ogungbo (yellow card) 13'; Telford 35'; Conroy 39'	Report	Ebanks-Landell (yellow card) 38'; Kelly (yellow card) 90+1'	Stadium: Broadfield Stadium; Attendance: 4,770; Referee: Sam Purkiss

1 April 2023 39	AFC Wimbledon	0–1	Rochdale	Wimbledon
15:00 BST	Little (yellow card) 82'; Brown (yellow card) 85'	Report	Lloyd 64'; Mellor (yellow card) 79'; Odoh (yellow card) 85'	Stadium: Plough Lane; Attendance: 7,380; Referee: Alan Young

7 April 2023 40	Rochdale	4–2	Walsall	Rochdale
15:00 BST	Henderson 42'; Lloyd 44'; Taylor 56'; Brierley 65'	Report	Matt 23'; Knowles 51'; Evans (yellow card) 65'; Maddox (yellow card) 69'	Stadium: Crown Oil Arena; Attendance: 3,090; Referee: Andy Haines

10 April 2023 41	Mansfield Town	1–1	Rochdale	Mansfield
15:00 BST	Boateng 6'; Perch (yellow card) 73'	Report	Dodgson 43'; Kelly (yellow card) 82'; O'Donnell (yellow card) 90+4'	Stadium: Field Mill; Attendance: 6,708; Referee: Anthony Backhouse

15 April 2023 42	Rochdale	0–3	Bradford City	Rochdale
15:00 BST	Graham (yellow card) 65'	Report	Stubbs 5'; Crichlow (yellow card) 16'; Ebanks-Landell 74' (o.g.); Banks 82'	Stadium: Crown Oil Arena; Attendance: 5,726; Referee: Lee Swabey

18 April 2023 43	Rochdale	2–2	Tranmere Rovers	Rochdale
19:45 BST	Dodgson (yellow card) 58'; Lloyd 69'; Ebanks-Landell 90+3'	Report	O'Donnell 19' (o.g.); Hawkes 56' (pen.); Hemmings (yellow card) 84'	Stadium: Crown Oil Arena; Attendance: 2,263; Referee: Scott Tallis

22 April 2023 44	Stockport County	1–0	Rochdale	Stockport
15:00 BST	Olaofe 45+8'; Lemonheigh-Evans (yellow card) 52'; Byrne (yellow card) 65'	Report	Ebanks-Landell (yellow card) 59'	Stadium: Edgeley Park; Attendance: 10,319; Referee: Scott Oldham

29 April 2023 45	Rochdale	4–1	Sutton United	Rochdale
15:00 BST	Rodney 8', 56'; Brierley 25'; Keohane 50'; Odoh (yellow card) 90'	Report	House (red card) 29'; Wilson 38'; Beautyman (yellow card) 64'; Smith (yellow card) 83'	Stadium: Crown Oil Arena; Attendance: 3,148; Referee: Ben Toner

8 May 2023 46	Harrogate Town	1–1	Rochdale	Harrogate
15:00 BST	Sims 74'	Report	Keohane 24'	Stadium: Wetherby Road; Attendance: 3,234; Referee: Carl Boyeson

=== FA Cup ===
Dale were drawn away to Bristol Rovers in the first round.

Win Draw Loss Fixtures

5 November 2022 First round	Bristol Rovers	1–0	Rochdale	Horfield
15:00 GMT	Sinclair 65'; Gibbons (yellow card) 69'	Report	John (yellow card) 14'; Odoh (yellow card) 63'	Stadium: Memorial Stadium; Attendance: 4,679; Referee: Will Finnie

=== EFL Cup ===
Win Draw Loss Fixtures

Rochdale were drawn at home to Burton Albion in the first round and away to Sheffield Wednesday in the second round.

9 August 2022 First round	Rochdale	2–0	Burton Albion	Rochdale
19:45 BST	Diagouraga (yellow card) 40'; Ball 86' (pen.); Rodney 90+4'	Report	Powell (yellow card) 30'; Onyango (yellow card) 84'	Stadium: Crown Oil Arena; Attendance: 1,601; Referee: Scott Oldham

23 August 2022 Second round	Sheffield Wednesday	3–0	Rochdale	Owlerton
19:45 BST	Brown 23'; Dele-Bashiru 36'; Adeniran 44'; Glover (yellow card) 57'; Vaulks (yellow card) 80'	Report	Seriki (yellow card) 66'; Rodney (yellow card) 80'	Stadium: Hillsborough; Attendance: 9,045; Referee: Ben Toner

=== EFL Trophy ===
On 20 June, the initial Group stage draw was made, grouping Rochdale with Accrington Stanley and Salford City. Three days later, Liverpool U21s joined Northern Group D.

Pos	Div	Team	Pld	W	PW	PL	L	GF	GA	GD	Pts	Qualification
1	L2	Salford City	3	1	2	0	0	4	3	+1	7	Advance to Round 2
2	L1	Accrington Stanley	3	1	1	1	0	6	5	+1	6	Advance to Round 2
3	L2	Rochdale	3	1	0	2	0	6	5	+1	5	
4	ACA	Liverpool U21	3	0	0	0	3	3	6	−3	0	

Source: EFL.com

Win Draw Loss Fixtures

30 August 2022 Group stage	Accrington Stanley	3–3 (4–3 p)	Rochdale	Accrington
19:45 BST	McConville 51'; Lowe 55'; Woods (yellow card) 62'; Coyle (yellow card) 79'; Pritchard (yellow card) 87'; Sinclair 90+4' (o.g.)	Report	Graham (yellow card) 35'; Ball 65'; Henderson 67'; Brierley 72'	Stadium: Wham Stadium; Attendance: 1,130; Referee: Peter Wright
	Penalties
	Savin (penalty scored); McConville (penalty scored); Leigh (penalty scored); Woods (penalty scored)		Henderson (penalty scored); Brierley (penalty scored); Sinclair (penalty missed); Kelly (penalty scored); White (penalty missed)

20 September 2022 Group stage	Rochdale	1–0	Liverpool U21	Rochdale
19:00 BST	Graham (yellow card) 45+1'; Campbell 82'; Henderson (penalty missed); Odoh (yellow card) 87'	Report	Olufunwa (yellow card) 24' (yellow-red card) 84'; Blair (yellow card) 87'	Stadium: Crown Oil Arena; Attendance: 1,060; Referee: Darren Handley

18 October 2022 Group stage	Rochdale	2–2 (2–4 p)	Salford City	Rochdale
19:00 BST	Henderson 42'; Kelly 90+4'	Report	Simões 69' (yellow card) 84'; Hendry 71'; Watt (yellow card) 88'	Stadium: Crown Oil Arena; Attendance: 1,203; Referee: Anthony Backhouse
	Penalties
	Henderson (penalty missed); Keohane (penalty missed); Brierley (penalty scored); Kelly (penalty scored)		Hendry (penalty scored); Watt (penalty scored); Watson (penalty scored); Bailey (penalty scored)
