= James Ball (footballer) =

English footballer (born 1995)

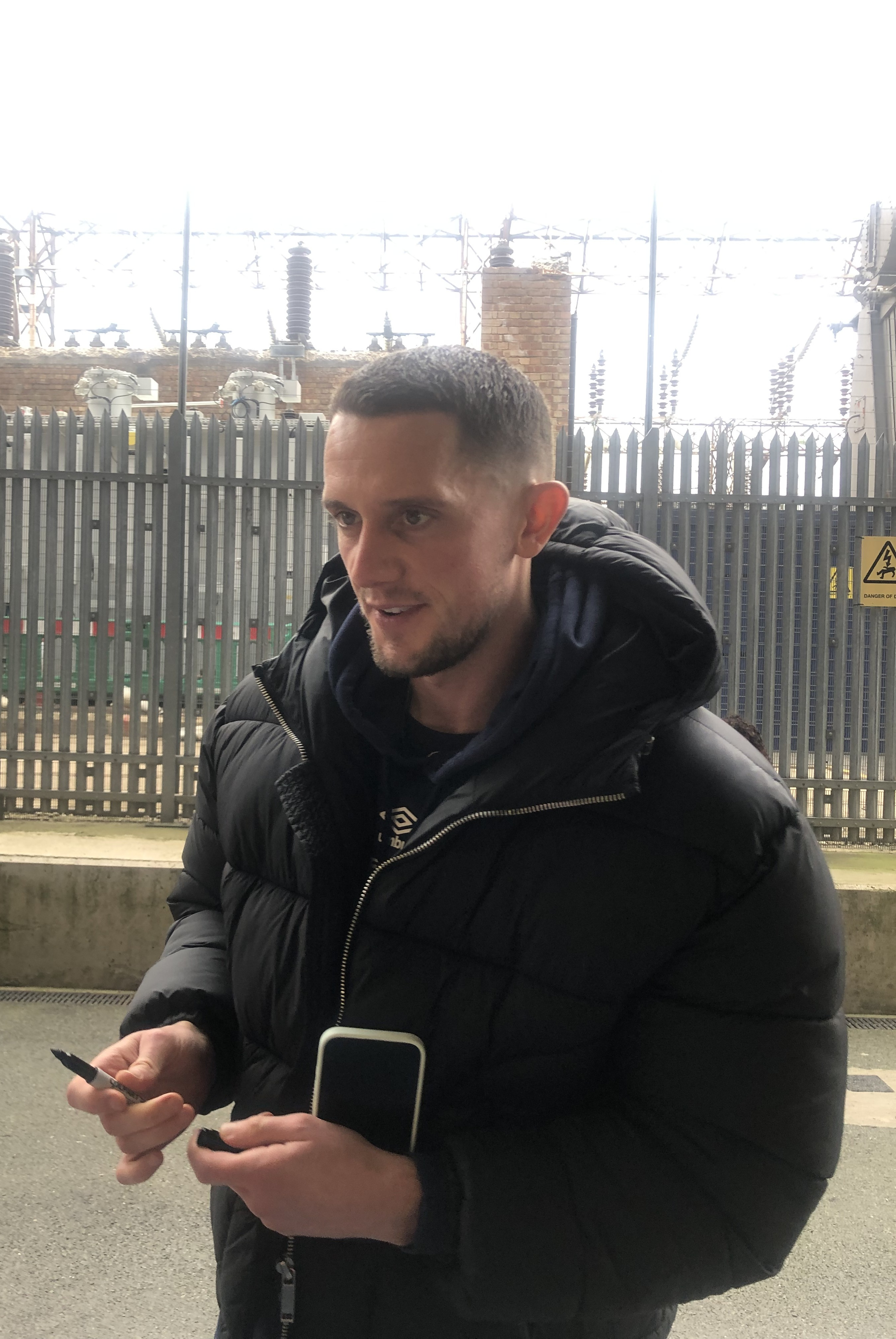
- Ball in 2025

Personal information
- Full name: James Cameron Ball
- Date of birth: 1 December 1995 (age 30)
- Place of birth: Bolton, England
- Height: 6 ft 3 in (1.91 m)
- Position: Midfielder

Team information
- Current team: Swindon Town
- Number: 6

Youth career
- Liverpool
- –2014: Bolton Wanderers

Senior career*
Years	Team	Apps	(Gls)
2014–2015	Bolton Wanderers	0	(0)
2014	→ Hyde United (loan)	5	(0)
2015–2016	Northwich Victoria		
2016	Stalybridge Celtic	6	(1)
2016–2018	Stockport County	74	(14)
2018–2019	Stevenage	18	(3)
2019	Ebbsfleet United	14	(1)
2019–2022	Solihull Moors	69	(15)
2022–2023	Rochdale	43	(5)
2023–2025	AFC Wimbledon	40	(2)
2025–	Swindon Town	32	(0)
- * Club domestic league appearances and goals as of 13:37, 22 November 2026 (UTC)

James Cameron Ball (born 1 December 1995) is an English professional footballer who plays as a midfielder for EFL League Two club Swindon Town.

Ball began his career in the youth system at Bolton Wanderers and spent time on loan at Conference North club Hyde United at the start of the 2014–15 season. Released by Bolton in May 2015 without making a first-team appearance, he went on to play for Northwich Victoria and Stalybridge Celtic before joining National League North club Stockport County in September 2016.

After two seasons at Stockport, Ball signed for League Two club Stevenage in May 2018, and subsequently had spells at Ebbsfleet United and Solihull Moors, where he scored 21 goals in 82 appearances over three years. He moved back to League Two with Rochdale in January 2022, then joined AFC Wimbledon in July 2023. Ball was part of the team that secured promotion via the 2025 League Two play-offs, before signing for Swindon Town in June 2025.

== Career ==
=== Early career ===
While playing Sunday league football, Ball was scouted by Liverpool and joined the club's academy following a successful trial. He remained there from under-12 to under-15 level before moving to his hometown club Bolton Wanderers. At the start of the 2014–15 season, he joined Conference North club Hyde United on a work experience loan. Ball made his debut in a 3–2 away defeat to Bradford Park Avenue on 25 August 2014, and made five appearances during the one-month spell. On returning to Bolton, Ball did not make any first-team appearances and was released in May 2015. He subsequently joined Northwich Victoria for the 2015–16 season.

After a season at Northwich, Ball signed for National League North club Stalybridge Celtic on a free transfer ahead of the 2016–17 season. He made his debut in a 1–0 opening-day win at Boston United, and played six times during a one-month spell, scoring in a 3–1 home defeat to Stockport County on 9 August 2016.

=== Stockport County ===
Ball signed for Stockport County on 6 September 2016, a month after scoring against them for Stalybridge. He had previously played under manager Jim Gannon at Northwich Victoria. He debuted the following day in a 2–1 away defeat to Darlington, scoring Stockport's goal. In March 2017, he signed a new two-year contract, with Gannon stating that Ball had the attributes to reach the Football League. He made 37 appearances and scored seven goals during the season, as Stockport missed out on the National League North play-offs by one point.

Contracted to Stockport for the 2017–18 season, Ball continued to play regularly in the centre of midfield throughout the season. He scored seven times in the club's final eleven fixtures, including a brace in a 4–0 win against Leamington and a 94th-minute winner in a 3–2 victory over Bradford Park Avenue a week later, helping Stockport secure a fifth-place finish and qualification for the National League North play-offs. Ball made 48 appearances in all competitions, scoring 11 goals, as Stockport were defeated in the qualifying round of the play-offs.

=== Stevenage ===
Ball signed for League Two club Stevenage on 9 May 2018 for an undisclosed five-figure fee. Stevenage manager Dino Maamria recommended Ball to chairman Phil Wallace in December 2017, describing him as one of the most highly regarded players in non-League football. He made his debut in the opening match of the 2018–19 season, scoring the first goal in a 2–2 draw with Tranmere Rovers at Broadhall Way. He was initially a regular starter in midfield but appeared predominantly as a substitute from October 2018. Ball was brought on as an 11th-minute substitute against Crawley Town on 12 January 2019, deployed as a striker, and scored both goals in a 2–1 victory. Maamria praised his work-rate and adaptability in the unfamiliar role. Ball started the next two matches, but was subsequently used mainly as a substitute and did not play for the final three months of the season. He finished the season with 21 appearances and four goals. Ball was transfer-listed on 9 May 2019.

=== Ebbsfleet United ===
After being transfer-listed by Stevenage, Ball joined National League club Ebbsfleet United on 15 July 2019. He made his debut in the opening match of the 2019–20 season in a 4–1 home defeat to FC Halifax Town, and scored his only goal for the club in a 2–1 away victory against Boreham Wood on 29 August 2019. Ball featured in all 14 of Ebbsfleet's matches in the opening two months of the season, before receiving a transfer bid from fellow National League club Solihull Moors.

=== Solihull Moors ===
Ball signed for Solihull Moors for an undisclosed fee on 4 October 2019, on a contract running until June 2021. He made his debut the following day as a second-half substitute in a 1–0 defeat to Boreham Wood. Ball scored his first goal for the club in a 2–1 home victory against Dagenham & Redbridge on 2 November 2019, and added four goals in Solihull's 5–1 FA Cup victory at Oxford City a week later. He made 28 appearances and scored eight goals during the remainder of the season, which was curtailed in March 2020 due to the COVID-19 pandemic. Ball finished the 2020–21 season as joint-top goalscorer for Solihull with 11 goals from 34 appearances in all competitions.

=== Rochdale ===
Ball scored three goals in 16 appearances for Solihull during the first half of the 2021–22 season, before signing for League Two club Rochdale on 31 January 2022 for an undisclosed fee on a two-and-a-half-year contract. He scored on his debut in a 2–1 defeat to Forest Green Rovers on 8 February 2022, and went on to record three goals in 11 appearances before a groin injury sustained against Mansfield Town in March curtailed his season. In the 2022–23 season, he scored four goals in 36 appearances as Rochdale were relegated to the National League.

=== AFC Wimbledon ===
While under contract at Rochdale, Ball joined AFC Wimbledon on a free transfer on 24 July 2023. He debuted in a 1–1 EFL Cup draw with Coventry City on 9 August 2023 and scored his only goal of the 2023–24 season later that month in a 1–1 draw with Forest Green Rovers, making 36 appearances. He remained with Wimbledon for the 2024–25 season after discussions with manager Johnnie Jackson, and he was utilised regularly as a central defender before sustaining a knee ligament injury in an FA Cup tie against Dagenham & Redbridge on 30 November 2024. He returned briefly as a substitute in March 2025 but did not feature thereafter, as Wimbledon secured promotion to League One via the play-offs. He was released by Wimbledon at the end of the season.

=== Swindon Town ===
Ball signed for League Two club Swindon Town on a two-year contract on 4 June 2025.

== Style of play ==
Ball was initially deployed as a striker during his time in the academies at Liverpool and Bolton Wanderers. At Bolton and whilst on loan at Hyde United, he was occasionally used as a centre-back due to injuries in the squad, before moving into central midfield, a role he described as a natural progression towards becoming a box-to-box midfielder. Upon signing for Stevenage, manager Dino Maamria characterised Ball as "big, strong, box-to-box, can cover a lot of ground and can score goals from midfield".

Ball has described himself as a goalscoring midfielder who likes to get into the penalty area, but has also stated he is comfortable as a centre-back, where he feels there is more time on the ball, and has been deployed in that position at Solihull and Wimbledon.

== Career statistics ==
As of match played 21 November 2026

Appearances and goals by club, season and competition
Club	Season	League			FA Cup		League Cup		Other		Total	
Club	Season	Division	Apps	Goals	Apps	Goals	Apps	Goals	Apps	Goals	Apps	Goals
Bolton Wanderers	2014–15	Championship	0	0	0	0	0	0	—		0	0
Hyde United (loan)	2014–15	Conference North	5	0	0	0	—		0	0	5	0
Stalybridge Celtic	2016–17	National League North	6	1	0	0	—		0	0	6	1
Stockport County	2016–17	National League North	33	5	2	2	—		2 (Note: Appearances in FA Trophy)	0	37	7
Stockport County	2017–18	National League North	41	9	0	0	—		7 (Note: Six appearances and two goals in FA Trophy; one appearance in 2018 National League North play-offs)	2	48	11
Stockport County	Total		74	14	2	2	0	0	9	2	85	18
Stevenage	2018–19	League Two	18	3	0	0	1	1	2 (Note: Appearance(s) in EFL Trophy)	0	21	4
Ebbsfleet United	2019–20	National League	14	1	0	0	—		0	0	14	1
Solihull Moors	2019–20	National League	23	3	3	5	—		2 (Note: One appearance in FA Trophy; one appearance in Scottish Challenge Cup)	0	28	8
Solihull Moors	2020–21	National League	30	9	2	0	—		2	1	34	10
Solihull Moors	2021–22	National League	16	3	2	0	—		2	0	20	3
Solihull Moors	Total		69	15	7	5	0	0	6	1	82	21
Rochdale	2021–22	League Two	11	3	—		—		0	0	11	3
Rochdale	2022–23	League Two	32	2	1	0	2	1	1	1	36	4
Rochdale	Total		43	5	1	0	2	1	1	1	47	7
AFC Wimbledon	2023–24	League Two	25	1	3	0	2	0	6	0	36	1
AFC Wimbledon	2024–25	League Two	15	1	2	0	2	0	2	0	21	1
AFC Wimbledon	Total		40	2	5	0	4	0	8	0	57	2
Swindon Town	2025–26	League Two	21	0	2	1	1	0	4	0	28	1
Swindon Town	2026–27	League Two	11	0	1	0	0	0	3	0	15	0
Swindon Town	Total		32	0	3	1	1	0	7	0	43	1
Career total			281	41	18	8	8	2	33	4	360	55

== Honours ==
AFC Wimbledon

- EFL League Two play-offs: 2025
