= Centurian =

Centurian may refer to:

- A frequent misspelling for "Centurion"
- Centurian, album by Idris Ackamoor
- Centurian, Californian wine grape, variety of Olmo grapes
- Centurian (band), Dutch death metal band formed in 1997
- The Centurians, musical group
- Centurian, resident of Centuria, Wisconsin

== Similar spellings ==
- Centurion, officer of the Royal Roma army
- Centurion (disambiguation)
- Centenarian, a one-hundred-year-old person
