= Richard O'Donnell (footballer) =

English footballer (born 1988)

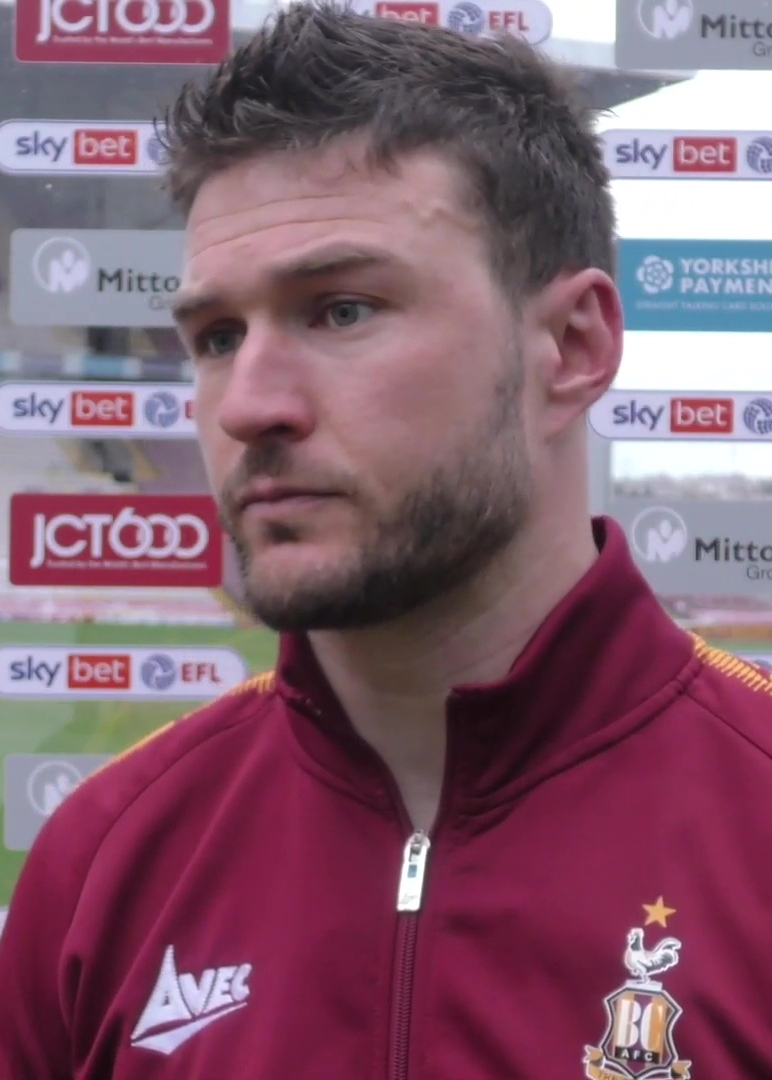
- O'Donnell in 2021

Personal information
- Full name: Richard Mark O'Donnell
- Date of birth: 12 September 1988 (age 38)
- Place of birth: Sheffield, England
- Height: 6 ft 2 in (1.88 m)
- Position: Goalkeeper

Team information
- Current team: Derby County
- Number: 12

Youth career
- –2005: Sheffield United
- –2006: Sheffield Wednesday

Senior career*
Years	Team	Apps	(Gls)
2006–2012	Sheffield Wednesday	15	(0)
2007	→ York City (loan)	0	(0)
2007–2008	→ Buxton (loan)	2	(0)
2008	→ Rotherham United (loan)	0	(0)
2008	→ Oldham Athletic (loan)	4	(0)
2010	→ Grimsby Town (loan)	10	(0)
2011	→ Alfreton Town (loan)	0	(0)
2012	→ Macclesfield Town (loan)	11	(0)
2012–2013	Chesterfield	14	(0)
2013	→ Stockport County (loan)	20	(0)
2013–2015	Walsall	90	(0)
2015–2016	Wigan Athletic	10	(0)
2016	→ Bristol City (loan)	4	(0)
2016–2017	Bristol City	25	(0)
2017–2018	Rotherham United	22	(0)
2018	Northampton Town	19	(0)
2018–2022	Bradford City	122	(0)
2022–2023	Rochdale	40	(0)
2023–2025	Blackpool	7	(0)
2025–	Derby County	8	(0)
2025	→ Grimsby Town (loan)	1	(0)
- * Club domestic league appearances and goals as of 16:05, 11 April 2026 (UTC)

Richard Mark O'Donnell (born 12 September 1988) is an English professional footballer who plays as a goalkeeper for EFL Championship club Derby County.

Having started his career with Sheffield Wednesday's youth system, O'Donnell progressed to the first team, for which he was largely used as an understudy goalkeeper. He played 20 times for Wednesday between 2006 and 2012, earning a significant amount of first-team appearances elsewhere as he spent time on loan with York City, Buxton, Rotherham United, Oldham Athletic, Grimsby Town, Alfreton Town and Macclesfield Town. He was released in the summer of 2012 and joined Chesterfield. In 2013, following limited first-team appearances, he signed a one-year contract at Walsall, where he would spend two years.

In 2015, he signed for Wigan Athletic and joined Bristol City on loan in January 2016, he would make this move permanment in February. In January 2017, he joined Rotherham United for an undisclosed fee where he would spend a year, joining Northampton Town in January 2018, spending six months at the club. In July 2018, he joined Bradford City, where he spent four years, before joining Rochdale in 2022, a year later he would sign for Blackpool where he would spend two years before leaving the club in June 2025. In July 2025, O'Donnell joined Derby County, he had a short-term emergency loan at Grimsby Town in November 2025.

== Career ==
=== Sheffield Wednesday ===
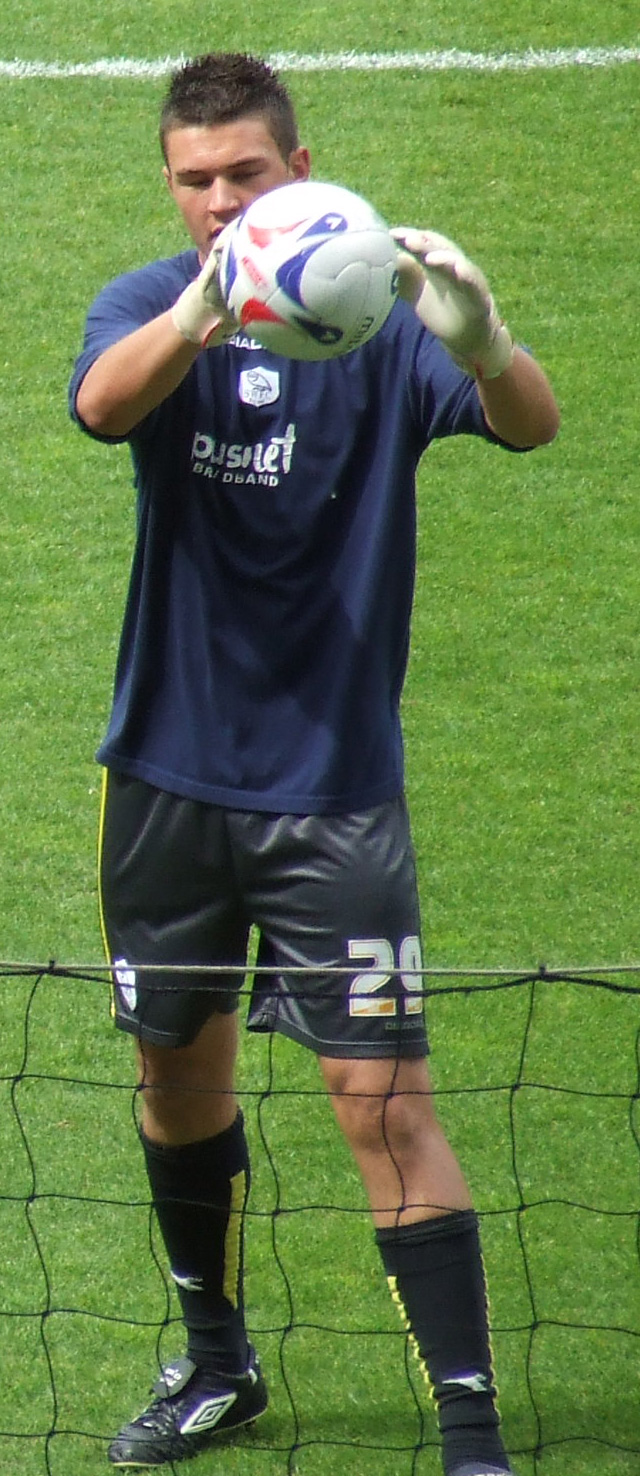
O'Donnell training with Sheffield Wednesday in 2007

Born in Sheffield, South Yorkshire, O'Donnell started his career with Sheffield Wednesday's youth system. He was called up to first team at the start of the 2006–07 season and was an unused substitute for the League Cup match against Wrexham as back-up for Chris Adamson. O'Donnell joined Conference National club York City on 2 March 2007 on a work-experience arrangement. He was recalled by Wednesday later that month, to provide cover for injuries.

O'Donnell signed his first professional contract with Wednesday in June 2007. He joined Buxton of the Northern Premier League Premier Division in December 2007 on a one-month loan, where he made two appearances. He joined League Two club Rotherham United on 8 January 2008 on a three-month loan, as back-up for Andy Warrington, but was recalled before the end of the deal as back-up to Wednesday's two first-choice goalkeepers. O'Donnell was then loaned to League One club Oldham Athletic on 14 March 2008 on an emergency seven-day loan. He made his Football League debut the following day at the age of 19 in a match against Luton Town.

He joined Conference Premier club Grimsby Town on 31 August 2010 on a one-month loan. He made his debut on 4 September 2010 against Luton, Grimsby winning 2–0 at home. On 4 February 2011, he joined Alfreton Town on a one-month loan.

He made his debut for Wednesday in a 2–0 defeat away to Southampton on 19 March 2011. On 15 May 2012, O'Donnell was amongst the six first-team players to be released by the club.

=== Chesterfield ===
The day following his release, O'Donnell signed for Chesterfield on a one-year contract. After appearing as an unused substitute in the first five matches, he made his debut on 4 September 2012 as an 89th-minute substitute for Tommy Lee in a 2–1 home win over Oldham Athletic. O'Donnell made his first start four days later, in a 2–2 away draw against York City on 8 September 2012. He appeared in the following 14 matches, mainly due to the absence of first-choice goalkeeper Tommy Lee, who was out for eight weeks. After Lee recovered and returned to the first team, O'Donnell was once again the club's back-up goalkeeper.

On 14 January 2013, O'Donnell joined Conference Premier club Stockport County on a one-month loan. O'Donnell had his loan spell extended with the club until 16 April 2013. While at Stockport, he made 20 appearances and established himself as first-choice goalkeeper, but the club was relegated to the Conference North. In the last match of the season, O'Donnell made his first Chesterfield appearance in over six months, a 4–0 home victory over Exeter City.

He was released at the end of that one-year contract, in April 2013, following limited first-team opportunities.

=== Walsall ===
Following his release from Chesterfield, O'Donnell signed a one-year contract with League One club Walsall on 18 July 2013. He was voted as their Player of the Year in 2014–15.

=== Wigan Athletic ===
On 22 May 2015, O'Donnell signed a three-year contract with League One club Wigan Athletic.

=== Bristol City ===
After losing his place to Jussi Jääskeläinen in the Wigan team, he joined Championship club Bristol City on 12 January 2016 on loan until the end of 2015–16 as cover for the injured Frank Fielding. He went straight into the team against Preston North End on the same day, in a 2–1 home defeat. He signed permanently on 1 February 2016, for an undisclosed fee, on a two-and-a-half-year contract.

=== Rotherham United ===
He re-signed for Championship club Rotherham United on 19 January 2017, on a two-and-a-half-year contract, for an undisclosed fee.

=== Northampton Town ===
O'Donnell signed for League One club Northampton Town on 8 January 2018, on a two-and-a-half-year contract, a for an undisclosed fee.

=== Bradford City ===
O'Donnell signed for League One club Bradford City on 27 June 2018 on a two-year contract, having been able to leave Northampton on a free transfer because of a relegation clause in his contract. He was offered a new contract by Bradford City in July 2020, following the expiry of his existing contract, signing a new two-year contract later that month.

He was appointed as Bradford City captain on 4 September 2020.

O'Donnell was released by the club at the end of the 2021–22 season, having not featured for the club since 30 November 2021.

=== Rochdale ===
On 18 May 2022, O'Donnell signed a two-year contract with Rochdale which came into effect on 1 July after his contract expired at Bradford City. At the end of the 2022–23 season, O'Donnell was awarded with the Supporters' Player of the Year trophy.

=== Blackpool ===
O'Donnell joined Blackpool on 27 June 2023.

=== Derby County ===
On 1 July 2025, O'Donnell joined Derby County of the Championship, on a one-year contract, where he was positioned as third-choice goalkeeper behind Jacob Widell Zetterström and Josh Vickers. On 20 November 2025, he re-joined Grimsby Town on an emergency-loan deal featuring in a 2-2 draw away to Swindon Town.

O'Donnell made his Derby County debut at Charlton Athletic on 20 January 2026; he had initially named on the bench but when it was decided post-warm up that Jacob Widell Zetterström was too ill to play, O'Donnell was promoted to the first-team at less than 30 minutes notice - Derby won 2-1, this was his first Championship appearance since May 2017. In March 2026, after an injury picked up by Vickers alongside Widell Zetterström's continued absence, O'Donnell was Derby's only fit senior goalkeeper so became effective number 1. On 19 March 2026, it was announced that O'Donnell had signed a one-year contract extension at Derby County, extending his stay until June 2027. O'Donnell made 8 Championship appearances for Derby County during the 2025–26 season, keeping three clean sheets.

== Career statistics ==
As of match played 11 April 2026

Appearances and goals by club, season and competition
Club	Season	League			FA Cup		League Cup		Other		Total	
Club	Season	Division	Apps	Goals	Apps	Goals	Apps	Goals	Apps	Goals	Apps	Goals
Sheffield Wednesday	2006–07	Championship	0	0	0	0	0	0	—		0	0
Sheffield Wednesday	2007–08	Championship	0	0	0	0	0	0	—		0	0
Sheffield Wednesday	2008–09	Championship	0	0	0	0	0	0	—		0	0
Sheffield Wednesday	2009–10	Championship	0	0	0	0	0	0	—		0	0
Sheffield Wednesday	2010–11	League One	9	0	0	0	0	0	0	0	9	0
Sheffield Wednesday	2011–12	League One	6	0	2	0	2	0	1 (Note: Appearance(s) in Football League Trophy)	0	11	0
Sheffield Wednesday	Total		15	0	2	0	2	0	1	0	20	0
York City (loan)	2006–07	Conference National	0	0	—		—		—		0	0
Buxton (loan)	2007–08	Northern Premier League; Premier Division	2	0	—		—		—		2	0
Rotherham United (loan)	2007–08	League Two	0	0	—		—		—		0	0
Oldham Athletic (loan)	2007–08	League One	4	0	—		—		—		4	0
Grimsby Town (loan)	2010–11	Conference Premier	10	0	—		—		—		10	0
Alfreton Town (loan)	2010–11	Conference North	0	0	—		—		—		0	0
Macclesfield Town (loan)	2011–12	League Two	11	0	—		—		—		11	0
Chesterfield	2012–13	League Two	14	0	1	0	0	0	2	0	17	0
Stockport County (loan)	2012–13	Conference Premier	20	0	—		—		—		20	0
Walsall	2013–14	League One	46	0	2	0	2	0	1	0	51	0
Walsall	2014–15	League One	44	0	2	0	2	0	6	0	54	0
Walsall	Total		90	0	4	0	4	0	7	0	105	0
Wigan Athletic	2015–16	League One	10	0	1	0	1	0	0	0	12	0
Bristol City (loan)	2015–16	Championship	4	0	—		—		—		4	0
Bristol City	2015–16	Championship	17	0	—		—		—		17	0
Bristol City	2016–17	Championship	8	0	1	0	2	0	—		11	0
Bristol City	Total		29	0	1	0	2	0	—		32	0
Rotherham United	2016–17	Championship	12	0	—		—		—		12	0
Rotherham United	2017–18	League One	10	0	1	0	2	0	2 (Note: Appearances in EFL Trophy)	0	15	0
Rotherham United	Total		22	0	1	0	2	0	2	0	27	0
Northampton Town	2017–18	League One	19	0	—		—		—		19	0
Bradford City	2018–19	League One	42	0	3	0	0	0	3	0	48	0
Bradford City	2019–20	League Two	33	0	2	0	0	0	0	0	35	0
Bradford City	2020–21	League Two	28	0	2	0	2	0	0	0	32	0
Bradford City	2021–22	League Two	19	0	2	0	1	0	0	0	22	0
Bradford City	Total		122	0	9	0	3	0	3	0	137	0
Rochdale	2022–23	League Two	40	0	1	0	1	0	2	0	44	0
Blackpool	2023–24	League One	1	0	3	0	2	0	7	0	13	0
Blackpool	2024–25	League One	6	0	1	0	3	0	1	0	11	0
Blackpool	Total		7	0	4	0	5	0	8	0	24	0
Derby County	2025–26	Championship	8	0	0	0	0	0	—		8	0
Derby County	2026–27	Championship	0	0	0	0	0	0	—		0	0
Derby County	Total		8	0	0	0	0	0	0	0	8	0
Grimsby Town (loan)	2025–26	League Two	1	0	—		—		—		1	0
Career total			424	0	24	0	20	0	25	0	493	0

== Honours ==
Walsall

- Football League Trophy runner-up: 2014–15

Individual

- Walsall Player of the Year: 2014–15
- Rochdale Supporters' Player of the Year: 2022–23
