= Whiteway, Bath =

Housing estate in Bath, Somerset, England

Coordinates: 51°22′29″N 2°24′17″W

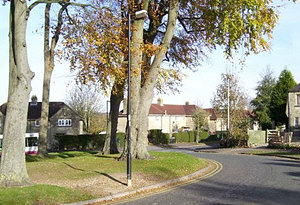
Part of Haycombe Drive at Whiteway

Whiteway is the name given to a housing estate contained within the Southdown and Twerton electoral wards of Bath, Somerset, England. The construction of the estate began shortly before the outbreak of the Second World War. Whiteway falls within the parish of St Barnabas Church at Mount Road, Southdown. Also close by is Southdown Methodist Centre at The Hollow, which provides a range of weekly support services.

A number of community resources are situated in Whiteway. The Southside Youth Centre at Kelston View offers activities for teenagers and is home to a boxing club for youth. Also at Kelston View is the entrance to Bath City Farm, which is open to the public and organises the Roots and Shoots pre-school group. The Community Playrangers run play sessions for older children at Bath City Farm. An elderly person's group called Golden-Oldies sings hit songs of the 50s, 60s and 70s in the Blagdon Park community room. The Southside Family Project has an office at St Michael's Road and offers extensive services in the areas of counselling and advice.

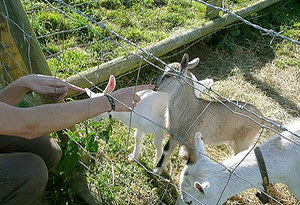
Goats at Bath City Farm, Kelston View

In December some Whiteway households decorate the exterior of their homes with Christmas lights. Other residents of Bath visit Whiteway to view the display.

A PACT (Partners and Communities Together) meeting is held four times a year in the Southdown Ward. This enables residents of Whiteway and Southdown to discuss local issues with Councillors, the police and representatives from other agencies. The time and venue for the PACT meetings are available from a section of the Avon and Somerset Constabulary website. A website called Proud of Twerton, Whiteway and Southdown provides information pertinent to Whiteway, including regular news, articles, and information about local community groups.

In August 2010 a resident-led group called Changes organised its first community event in Rosewarn Field, Whiteway. Then in November 2010 the group created a website giving details of its projects and philosophy of community action.
