= Sam Graham =

English association football player

Personal information
- Full name: Samuel George Graham
- Date of birth: 13 August 2000 (age 26)
- Place of birth: Sheffield, England
- Height: 1.91 m (6 ft 3 in)
- Position: Centre back

Team information
- Current team: Dagenham & Redbridge
- Number: 5

Youth career
- –2018: Sheffield United

Senior career*
Years	Team	Apps	(Gls)
2018–2021	Sheffield United	0	(0)
2018	→ FC Halifax Town (loan)	7	(0)
2018–2019	→ Oldham Athletic (loan)	7	(0)
2019	→ Central Coast Mariners (loan)	8	(0)
2019	→ Notts County (loan)	10	(0)
2020–2021	→ Notts County (loan)	2	(0)
2021–2023	Rochdale	41	(0)
2022	→ Notts County (loan)	4	(0)
2023–2024	AFC Fylde	36	(0)
2024–2025	Airdrieonians	26	(0)
2025–	Dagenham & Redbridge	37	(0)
- * Club domestic league appearances and goals as of 10:26, 13 November 2026 (UTC)

Samuel George Graham (born 13 August 2000) is an English professional footballer who plays as a defender for National League South club Dagenham & Redbridge.

== Career ==
=== Sheffield United ===
On 10 March 2017, Graham signed his first professional contract with Sheffield United, signing a deal until 2020. On 24 March 2018, he joined National League side FC Halifax Town on loan until the end of the season. Graham was loaned out to Oldham Athletic on 6 July 2018

On 31 January 2019, Graham was loaned out to Australian side Central Coast Mariners for the remainder of the 2018–19 A-League season.

On 5 August 2019, Graham was loaned out to Notts County for the 2019–20 season.

On 8 September 2020, the loan was extended.

=== Rochdale ===
On 29 July 2021, Graham signed a two-year contract with Rochdale.

On 23 March 2022, Graham returned to Notts County for a third loan spell with the club, this time until the end of the 2021–22 season.

=== AFC Fylde ===
On 19 September 2023, Graham joined AFC Fylde on a short-term deal following a successful trial period. He departed the club at the end of the 2023–24 season.

=== Airdrieonians ===
On 16 August 2024, Graham joined Scottish Championship club Airdrieonians.

=== Dagenham & Redbridge ===
In July 2025, Graham returned to England, joining National League South side Dagenham & Redbridge on a two-year deal.

== Career statistics ==
As of match played 29 August 2026

Appearances and goals by club, season and competition
Club	Season	League			National cup (Note: Includes FA Cup, Scottish Cup)		League cup (Note: Includes EFL Cup)		Other		Total	
Club	Season	Division	Apps	Goals	Apps	Goals	Apps	Goals	Apps	Goals	Apps	Goals
FC Halifax Town (loan)	2017–18	National League	7	0	—		—		—		7	0
Oldham Athletic (loan)	2018–19	League Two	7	0	0	0	1	0	1 (Note: Appearance(s) in EFL Trophy)	0	9	0
Central Coast Mariners (loan)	2018–19	A-League	8	0	—		—		—		8	0
Notts County (loan)	2019–20	National League	10	0	—		—		1 (Note: Appearance(s) in FA Trophy)	0	11	0
Notts County (loan)	2020–21	National League	2	0	0	0	—		2	1	4	1
Rochdale	2021–22	League Two	12	0	1	0	0	0	1	0	14	0
Rochdale	2022–23	League Two	29	0	1	0	1	0	2	0	33	0
Rochdale	Total		41	0	2	0	1	0	3	0	47	0
Notts County (loan)	2021–22	National League	4	0	—		—		0	0	4	0
AFC Fylde	2023–24	National League	36	0	2	1	—		2	0	40	1
Airdrieonians	2024–25	Scottish Championship	26	0	3	0	0	0	5 (Note: Two appearances in Scottish Challenge Cup; Three appearances in Scottish Championship play-offs)	0	34	0
Dagenham & Redbridge	2025–26	National League South	32	0	3	0	—		3	0	38	0
Dagenham & Redbridge	2026–27	National League South	5	0	0	0	—		0	0	5	0
Dagenham & Redbridge	Total		37	0	3	0	—		3	0	43	0
Career total			178	0	10	1	2	0	17	1	207	2
