= The Centurion, Bath =

Listed pub in Bath, England

Coordinates: 51.3788°N 2.4019°W

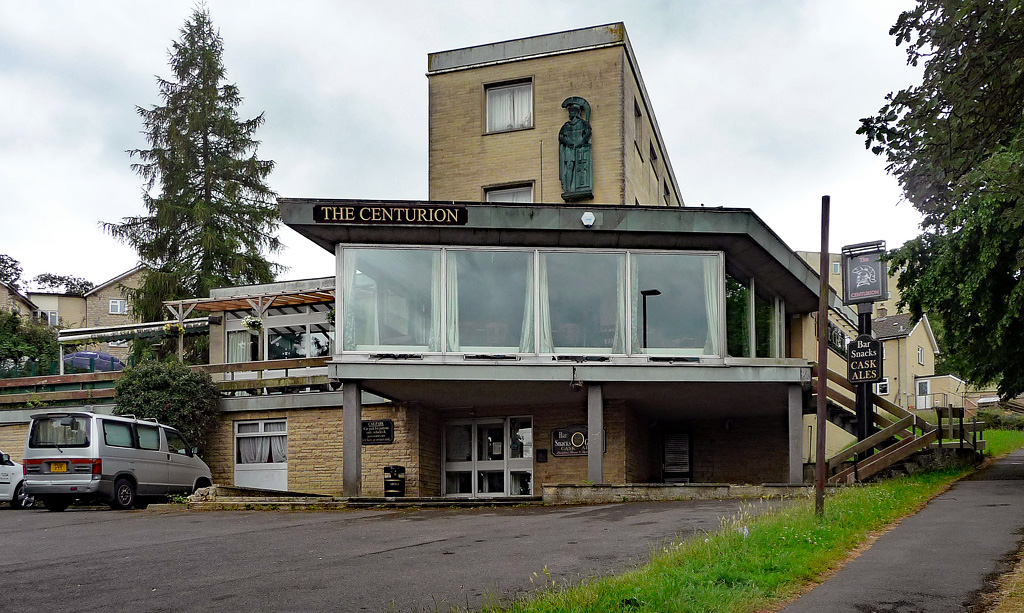

The Centurion is a grade II listed public house in Twerton, Bath, Somerset, England. It was built in 1965 and the outside features a large bronze Roman centurion.

The building has a steel frame with pre-stressed concrete floors and a large window. It sits on a hillside with three floors and a basement which is used as an entrance on the northern side.

On the outside of the building is a bronze figure of a Roman centurion. Inside the bar is a statue of Julius Caesar. There is also a section of Roman mosaic floor in the entrance.
