= Centurion (play-by-mail game) =

Play-by-mail space combat game

- Publishers: Pagoda (UK)
- Years active: 1983 to 2000
- Genres: wargame, science fiction, play-by-mail
- Languages: English
- Players: maximum 8 per game
- Playing time: fixed
- Materials required: Instructions, order sheets, turn results, paper, pencil
- Media type: Play-by-mail or email

Centurion is a space-based play-by-mail (PBM) game.

== History and development ==
Centurion was a closed-ended space-based play-by-mail wargame. It was based on the tabletop game Centurion, published by FASA. In 1994, Pagoda Games began offering the game in the U.K.

The game was open-ended and mixed moderated.

== Gameplay ==
The game featured fast-paced tactical combat between two teams. Four players per team was normal although different team sizes were possible. Two sides were available, called the Terran Overlord Government (TOG) and the Renegade/Commonwealth. At the outset, players had 200 points to allocate toward tanks for the team (called a Century), of Light, Medium, and Heavy varieties, customizable with numerous weapons systems as well as infantry and artillery support.

Equipment and weaponry were advanced, including hovering tanks and energy weapons.

== Reception ==
Bob Bost reviewed the game in the March–April 1994 issue of Flagship stating that "Centurion is a great game for the tactical wargamer. It is fast and furious from almost the start of the game and will keep you hanging on the edge of your chair as you await the turn results."

Dr. Robert J. Bunker reviewed Centurion in White Wolf Inphobia #55 (May, 1995) and stated that "For the money, Centurion is an excellent PBM value. The game is stimulating and fast-paced. Engagements are deadly with burned out and wrecked AFVs littering the battlefield, buildings reduced to rubble, forests turned into kindling and craters dotting the landscape."

== See also ==
- List of play-by-mail games

== Bibliography ==
- Bost, Bob (March–April 1994). "Centurion: First of the FASA Trilogy". Flagship. No. 48 (U.S. ed.). pp. 18–20.
- Pattist, Lance; Monson, Gordon (May–June 1995). "Centurion Dual Diary, Part 1". Flagship. No. 55 (U.S. ed.). pp. 13–16.
- Browning, Joey (July–August 1995). "Centurion Diary – Sudden Death!". Flagship. No. 55 (U.S. ed.). p. 15.
