= HMS Centurion =

Eight ships and a shore establishment of the Royal Navy have been named HMS Centurion, after the centurions of ancient Rome. A ninth ship was planned but never built.

== Ships ==
- English ship Centurion (1650) was a 34-gun ship launched in 1650 and wrecked in 1689.
- HMS Centurion (1691) was a 48-gun fourth-rate launched in 1691 and broken up in 1728.
- HMS Centurion (1732) was a 60-gun fourth-rate launched in 1732 and broken up 1769 after George Anson's voyage around the world
- HMS Centurion (1774) was a 50-gun fourth-rate launched in 1774. She was reduced to harbour service in 1809, sank at her moorings in 1824, and was raised and broken up in 1825.
- HMS Centurion was a 74-gun third-rate launched in 1812 as HMS Clarence. She was renamed HMS Centurion in 1826 and was broken up in 1828.
- HMS Centurion (1844) was an 80-gun third-rate launched in 1844. She was converted to screw propulsion in 1855, and sold in 1870.
- HMS Centurion (1892) was a Centurion-class battleship launched in 1892 and sold in 1910.
- HMS Centurion (1911) was a King George V-class battleship launched in 1911. She was converted to a target ship in 1926, rated as an escort ship in 1940, and was sunk off Arromanches as a breakwater in 1944.
- HMS Centurion was to have been a 9,000 ton cruiser, planned in 1945, but cancelled in 1946.

== Shore establishment ==
- HMS Centurion (shore establishment) was the central drafting depot established at Haslemere in 1956, commissioned in 1957 and named in 1964. The base moved to Gosport, becoming a drafting depot and a pay and accounting centre, in 1970. It was paid off in 1994, becoming Centurion building, a tender to HMS Sultan, mainly responsible for personnel and Human Resources functions.

== Battle honours ==
Ships named Centurion have earned the following battle honours:

- Armada, 1588
- Cadiz, 1596
- Dover, 1652
- Portland, 1653
- Gabbard, 1653
- Scheveningen, 1653
- Santa Cruz, 1657
- Lowestoft, 1665
- Four Days' Battle, 1666
- Orfordness, 1666
- Barfleur, 1692
- Velez Malaga, 1704
- Marbella, 1705
- Nuestra Senora de Covadonga, 1743
- Finisterre, 1747
- Louisbourg, 1758
- Quebec, 1759
- Havana, 1762
- St. Lucia, 1778
- China, 1900
- Jutland, 1916
- Normandy, 1944
