= Centurio =

Centurio may refer to:

- Centurio senex, binomial name of the Wrinkle-faced bat
- Clan Centurio, a clan from Final Fantasy XII

== See also ==
- Centurion, ancient Roman army officer rank
