= Diego Centurión =

Paraguayan footballer (born 1982)

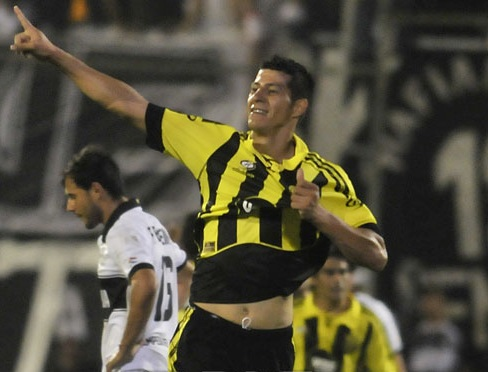
- Centurión with Guaraní in 2012

Personal information
- Full name: Diego Omar López Centurión
- Date of birth: 5 June 1982 (age 44)
- Place of birth: Caaguazú, Paraguay
- Height: 1.88 m (6 ft 2 in)
- Position: Striker

Team information
- Current team: Sportivo Luqueño
- Number: 9

Youth career
- 1996–1998: Atlético Caaguazú

Senior career*
Years	Team	Apps	(Gls)
1998	Tembetary		
1998	Roma		
1999	→ Udinese (loan)		
2000	Sportivo Luqueño		(1)
2001–2002	→ Libertad (loan)		
2002–2003	→ Guaraní (loan)		(3)
2003	→ Olimpo (loan)	0	(0)
2004	César Vallejo		(3)
2005–2006	A.C. Palazzolo	5	(0)
2007	Tacuary		
2007–2008	A.S.D. Sanremese	21	(4)
2008–2009	A.S.D. Pro Settimo	6	(2)
2009	F.B.C. Veloce 1910		
2010–2011	Deportivo Caaguazú	30	(10)
2011–2012	Tacuary	32	(4)
2012–2013	→ Guaraní (loan)	32	(13)
2013–2014	→ Olimpia (loan)	34	(8)
2015	Sportivo Luqueño	5	(0)
- * Club domestic league appearances and goals as of 29 May 2015

Diego Omar López Centurión (born 5 June 1982), better known as Diego Centurión, is a Paraguayan professional footballer who plays as a striker for Sportivo Luqueño, from the Paraguayan Primera División.

== Club career ==
=== Early life ===
Diego Centurión was born in Caaguazú, Paraguay, where he was the fourth of seven children from a poor family. He arrived at Atlético Caaguazú, where one of his older brothers was playing, at age 14. Even at that age he debuted in the first team, that was champion of the local tournament. Immediately was seen by a businessman called Epifanio Rojas, who took him to Tembetary, by then playing in the Second Division. He made his professional debut in 1998, at age 16.

=== Europe and serious injury ===
That same year was transferred to Serie A team A.S. Roma, where he was six months until he suffered a torn ligament in his knee, after a strong collision with teammate Cafu, during a training session.

Centurión was loaned to Udinese, where he underwent surgery. After that, he was sent to Germany to continue his rehabilitation, which once completed, it allowed him to return to the Italian football.
