= Twerton =

Electoral ward in Bath, United Kingdom

Coordinates: 51.381°N 2.398°W

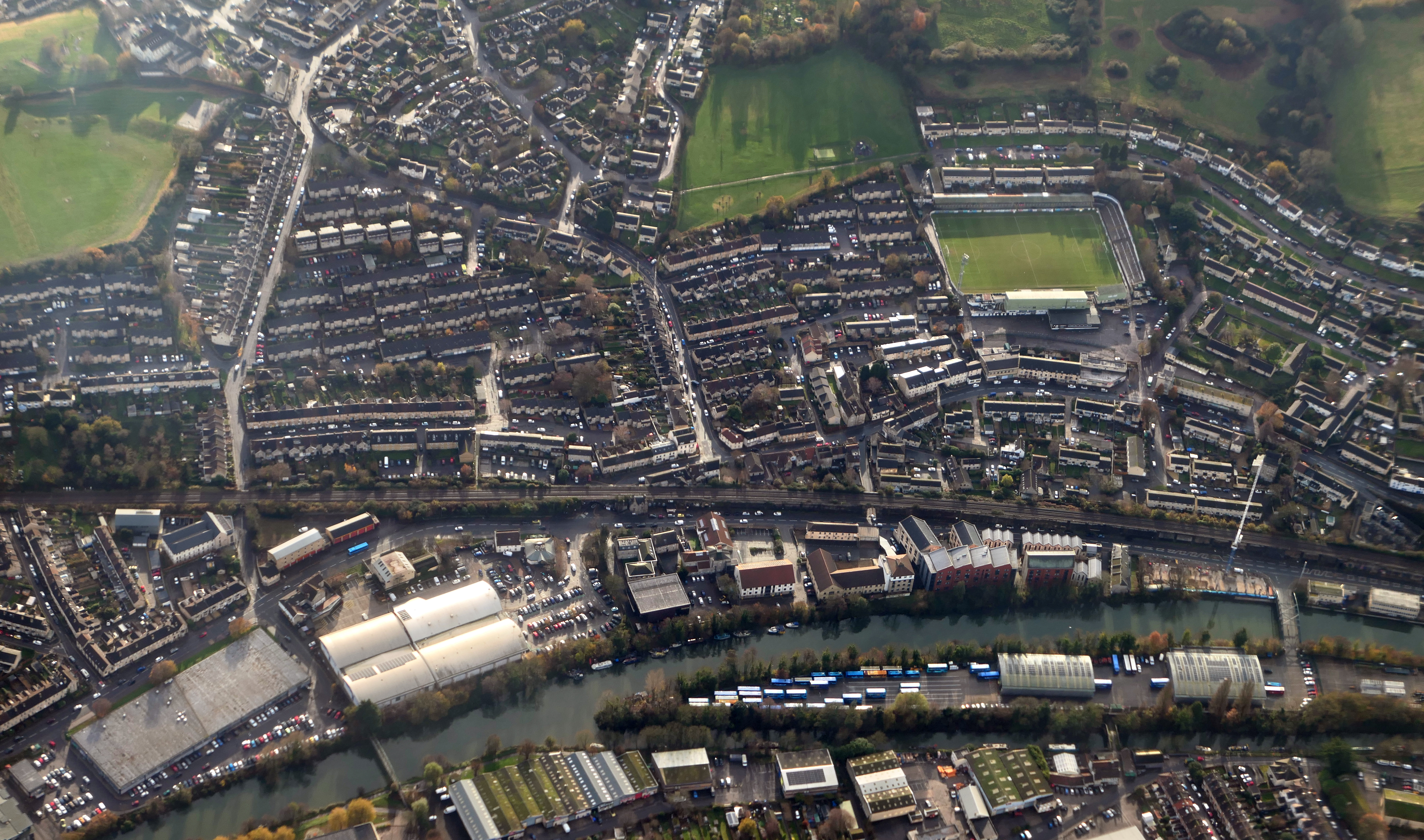

- Location within Somerset
- Population: 5,905 (2011.ward)
- OS grid reference: ST723642
- Unitary authority: Bath and North East Somerset
- Ceremonial county: Somerset
- Region: South West
- Country: England
- Sovereign state: United Kingdom
- Post town: BATH
- Postcode district: BA2
- Dialling code: 01225
- Police: Avon and Somerset
- Fire: Avon
- Ambulance: South Western
- UK Parliament: Bath

Twerton is a suburb of the city of Bath, in the Bath and North East Somerset district, in the ceremonial county of Somerset, England, situated to the west of the city, and home to the city's football club, Bath City.

Twerton is served by several bus routes. The service 5 is operated by First West of England, linking Twerton to Bath's centre, running every 12 mins. For a time, there was a duplicate Wessex Connect service, operating under the name Royal Bath. This was discontinued in the summer of 2013. Other bus routes that operate in Twerton include service 12, operated by Faresaver, service, 20 operated by The Big Lemon, and service 22, currently operated by First Bus

Twerton high street houses two pubs (the Old Crown and the Full Moon), a minimarket, McColl's convenience store (containing a Post Office counter (Now a Morrisons Daily) formerly Blockbuster, a bakery, a Boots Pharmacy, two learning centres, a volunteering organisation and two hairdressing salons.

The Whiteway housing estate is located in the south of the Twerton electoral ward. There is also a community centre at the Quebec Social Centre and a community garden at Hanna Close. There is also a day centre for adults with learning disabilities, Carrswood Day Service, on Cleeve Green, with day support access for service users across Bath and North East Somerset.

== History ==
The Domesday Book of 1086 records that Twerton was held by Nigel de Gournay, who would have won his lands in Englishcombe, Twerton, Swainswick and Barrow Gurney by fighting for William I of England. His original home must have been Gournay, which was half-way between Dieppe and Paris. The parish of Twerton was part of the Wellow Hundred.

In 1911 the civil parish had a population of 13,114. On 9 November 1911 the parish was abolished and merged with Bath.

Thomas de Gournay was involved with the murder of Edward II at Berkeley Castle in 1327.

At the time when Brunel was designing the Great Western Railway, his plan was for the line from Bath to Bristol to go through the centre of Twerton. The railway station on the main line, called Twerton-on-Avon, survived until 1917. Twerton was also the terminus of one line of the Bath Tramways system until that closed in 1939.

St Michael's church was enlarged in 1824 by local architect John Pinch the elder and rebuilt in 1839 by the city architect George Phillips Manners. Twerton Gaol was built by Manners in 1840 and closed in 1878. Only the governor's house survives, now converted into apartments.

The author Henry Fielding who wrote Tom Jones lived in Twerton and is believed to have written most of the novel while living there. His house, Fielding's Lodge, was demolished for road improvements by Bath City Council in 1963.

Housing shortages and population growth after World War II led to significant building of council housing in Twerton and Whiteway, on a much larger scale than elsewhere in Bath. The demographics of the area reflect that fact, with 48% of households in the ward renting from the council or other social housing bodies, and the ward remaining predominantly working class, in contrast to the rest of the city.

The Centurion pub, which was built in 1965, was made a Grade II listed building in 2018.

== Geography ==
Carrs Woodland is a 21.1 hectares (52 acres) local nature reserve in the valley of Newton Brook. It includes the notable Bath asparagus. Twerton Roundhill is a 4.66 hectares (11.5 acres) nature reserve of grassland with a range of wildflowers including greater knapweed and agrimony.

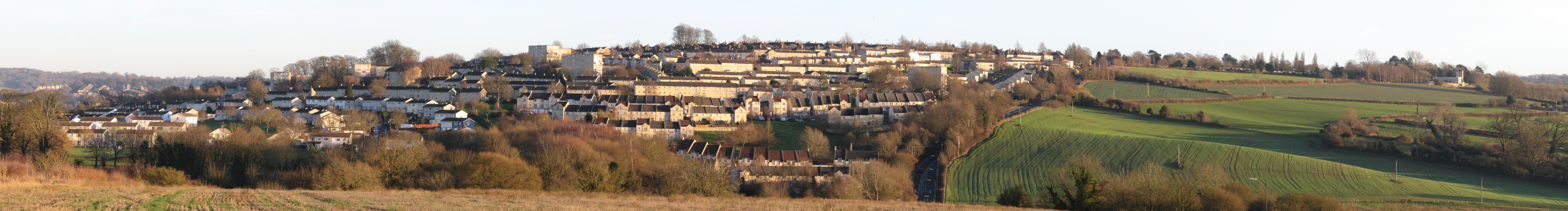
Housing in western Twerton, looking toward the village of Englishcombe on the right.
