= Devante Rodney =

English footballer (born 1998)

Personal information
- Full name: Devante Darrius Rodney
- Date of birth: 19 May 1998 (age 28)
- Place of birth: Manchester, England
- Height: 6 ft 2 in (1.88 m)
- Position: Forward

Team information
- Current team: Rochdale
- Number: 10

Youth career
- 2007–2013: Manchester City
- 2013–2017: Sheffield Wednesday

Senior career*
Years	Team	Apps	(Gls)
2017–2018	Hartlepool United	45	(4)
2018–2020	Salford City	19	(1)
2019	→ FC Halifax Town (loan)	12	(7)
2019–2020	→ Stockport County (loan)	12	(3)
2020	→ FC Halifax Town (loan)	8	(5)
2020–2022	Port Vale	54	(12)
2022	Walsall	14	(0)
2022–	Rochdale	138	(43)
- * Club domestic league appearances and goals as of 18:35, 1 May 2026 (UTC)

Devante Darrius Rodney (born 19 May 1998) is an English professional footballer who plays as a forward for EFL League Two club Rochdale.

Rodney spent his youth at the academies at Manchester City and Sheffield Wednesday before signing with Hartlepool United in January 2017. Four months later, he made his senior debut and established himself in the first team in the 2017–18 season. He was sold to Salford City in June 2018. However, he spent the second half of the 2018–19 season on loan at National League rivals FC Halifax Town, before returning to Salford to help the club to win promotion into the English Football League with victory in the 2019 play-off final. He spent much of the 2019–20 season on loan at Stockport County and Halifax. He signed with Port Vale in July 2020 and finished as the top-scorer for the 2020–21 campaign before joining Walsall for an undisclosed fee in January 2022. He transferred to Rochdale in June 2022. He was promoted out of the National League play-offs with Rochdale in 2026.

== Career ==
=== Youth career ===
Rodney began his career in the youth team of Manchester City at the age of nine. He remained in Manchester for six years before joining the academy of Sheffield Wednesday.

=== Hartlepool United ===
On 6 January 2017, Rodney joined EFL League Two side Hartlepool United. He was reportedly not one of manager Craig Hignett's main targets and was assigned squad number 38 and sent to play for Sam Collins's reserve team. The club already had an established strike force in Pádraig Amond and Billy Paynter. New manager Dave Jones handed Rodney his professional debut on 1 April, in a 2–0 defeat to Portsmouth at Victoria Park. He scored two goals against Doncaster Rovers on the final day of the 2016–17 season as Hartlepool fought relegation, his goals were almost enough to keep the club up until Mark O'Brien scored a late winner for Newport County against Notts County to send Hartlepool down to the National League.

His next goal came on 14 October 2017, in a 2–1 win at South Shields in the FA Cup; manager Craig Harrison noted that "he's had some great opportunities in the last four to five games. He could have had five goals to his name by now quite easily". Speaking the following March, new manager Matthew Bates said that Rodney was impressive in training and just needed to translate his hard work into goals. On 17 April, he was sent off for two bookable offences in a 1–0 home win over Leyton Orient. He ended the 2017–18 season with three goals in 22 starts and 22 substitute appearances as "Pools" posted a 15th-place finish. In the summer, he turned down the club's offer of a new contract.

=== Salford City ===
On 15 June 2018, Rodney signed for newly-promoted National League team Salford City for an undisclosed fee, reported to be £20,000. In February 2019, he joined league rivals FC Halifax Town on loan for a month. He formed a successful strike partnership with fellow loanee Manny Duku and his loan deal was extended until the end of the 2018–19 season on 30 March. He scored seven goals in twelve games for Jamie Fullarton's "Shaymen". He returned to Moor Lane at the end of the loan period and came on as an extra time substitute in the National League play-off semi-final victory over Eastleigh. He also featured in the play-off final at Wembley Stadium, coming on as a 55th-minute substitute for Gus Mafuta as the "Ammies" beat AFC Fylde 3–0 to secure promotion into the English Football League.

On 8 October 2019, Rodney was loaned back to the National League with Stockport County until January 2020; he had tried to rejoin Halifax but had to instead go to Edgeley Park as a deal could not be arranged. He returned to Salford in January 2020 on the expiry of his loan period, having scored three goals in 14 matches playing on the right-wing for Jim Gannon's "Hatters". The following day he went out on loan again, returning to Halifax; manager Pete Wild said that he was "absolutely ecstatic" to secure the player's services ahead of strong competition from other clubs. He enjoyed another successful loan spell at The Shay, scoring five goals in eight games. Rodney was released from his contract at Salford after manager Graham Alexander confirmed he would not be offered a new deal on 17 May. Halifax qualified for the play-offs, due to take place two months late in July 2020 due to the COVID-19 pandemic in England, but Wild confirmed that Rodney would not be featuring as he was in negotiations to sign for another club.

=== Port Vale ===
On 7 July 2020, Rodney signed a three-year contract with League Two side Port Vale; manager John Askey brought him to the club to compete with Tom Pope, Mark Cullen and fellow new signing Theo Robinson. He scored his first goal for the "Valiants" on 19 September, in a 2–0 win at Exeter City. Speaking in November, coach Dave Kevan said that Rodney had been "a little bit stop start" and that "he just needs to be consistent and believe in the abilities and the strengths and qualities he has as a player and recognise he can do damage at this level". Kevan said that Rodney gave his best performance yet in a 6–3 win at Bolton Wanderers on 5 December despite him not getting on the scoresheet as he "was a real outlet for us and he really occupied their back three". He began the 2020–21 season playing out wide, before spending time out with COVID-19 and then establishing himself as the club's central striker in December. He was named in the League Two Team of the Week for his performance in a 1–1 draw with Forest Green Rovers on 15 December. He was nominated for the EFL League Two Player of the Month award after scoring four goals in four games in January, including a brace in a 5–1 win over Southend United. He was named as the club's Young Player of the Year after finishing as top-scorer with 12 goals from 44 games.

He was given a three-match ban for an off the ball incident, which the match officials had missed in a 2–1 win at Swindon Town on 11 September 2021. Speaking in the January transfer window, director of football David Flitcroft admitted that contract talks with the player had "flatlined" but that transfer bids from other clubs had been rejected as they had not met the club's valuation.

=== Walsall ===
On 28 January 2022, Rodney signed for fellow League Two side Walsall for an undisclosed fee (with add-on fees), signing a two-and-a-half-year contract. Rodney said that he had spoken with head coach Matthew Taylor and technical director Jamie Fullarton – who he had worked with Halifax, and felt that the "Saddlers" playing style and ambitions were a good match for him. Taylor was sacked the following month, and new head coach Michael Flynn said that Rodney just needed to score his first goal at the Bescot Stadium in order to gain confidence. Teammate Conor Wilkinson said that Rodney was sharp in training and that his build-up play was excellent. However, he would end the 2021–22 season without a goal in his two starts and twelve substitute appearances.

=== Rochdale ===
On 15 June 2022, Rodney signed for Rochdale from Walsall on a two-year deal after Walsall and Rochdale agreed a transfer; manager Robbie Stockdale said that "we want hungry players who we can also develop, and Devante falls into that category". He finished as the club's top-scorer with 12 goals from 45 games in the 2022–23 season, as Rochdale were relegated following a last place finish in the English Football League; this tally included a brace against Sutton United in the final home game of the season at Spotland Stadium. He missed the start of the 2023–24 season due to illness, though was linked with a return to the EFL after finishing the season strongly. On 21 June 2024, Rodney signed a new two-year contract with Rochdale. He scored 19 goals in 39 appearances during the 2024–25 season, including a brace in the play-off quarter-final defeat to Southend United. He signed a new two-year contract in July 2025. He said all my career "I've chased happiness and I feel like I've found it here". He scored eight goals in 43 league games in the 2025–26 campaign. On 10 May, Rochdale defeated Boreham Wood on penalties in the play-off final to secure promotion back into the EFL.

== Style of play ==
Rodney is a forward with pace, energy and a high work rate. Speaking in July 2020, Port Vale manager John Askey said that: "he is strong and quick and he has decent ability as well. There are things in his game he needs to improve, his hold up play and his heading. But his main asset is his pace and strength."

== Career statistics ==
As of match played 10 May 2026

Club statistics
Club	Season	League			FA Cup		EFL Cup		Other		Total	
Club	Season	Division	Apps	Goals	Apps	Goals	Apps	Goals	Apps	Goals	Apps	Goals
Hartlepool United	2016–17	League Two	4	2	0	0	0	0	0	0	4	2
Hartlepool United	2017–18	National League	41	2	2	1	—		1 (Note: Appearance(s) in the FA Trophy)	0	44	3
Hartlepool United	Total		45	4	2	1	0	0	1	0	48	5
Salford City	2018–19	National League	16	1	2	0	—		6 (Note: Appearance(s) in the FA Trophy and National League play-offs)	3	24	4
Salford City	2019–20	League Two	3	0	0	0	0	0	0	0	3	0
Salford City	Total		19	1	2	0	0	0	6	3	27	4
FC Halifax Town (loan)	2018–19	National League	12	7	—		—		0	0	12	7
Stockport County (loan)	2019–20	National League	12	3	1	0	—		1	0	14	3
FC Halifax Town (loan)	2019–20	National League	8	5	—		—		0	0	8	5
Port Vale	2020–21	League Two	40	11	0	0	1	0	3 (Note: Appearance(s) in the EFL Trophy)	1	44	12
Port Vale	2021–22	League Two	14	1	1	0	0	0	2	0	17	1
Port Vale	Total		54	12	1	0	1	0	5	1	61	13
Walsall	2021–22	League Two	14	0	0	0	0	0	0	0	14	0
Rochdale	2022–23	League Two	40	11	1	0	2	1	2	0	45	12
Rochdale	2023–24	National League	20	7	1	0	—		0	0	21	7
Rochdale	2024–25	National League	35	17	0	0	—		4 (Note: 3 appearances in the EFL Trophy, 1 appearance and 2 goals in the play-offs)	2	39	19
Rochdale	2025–26	National League	43	8	0	0	—		3 (Note: 1 appearance in the National League Cup, 2 appearances and 1 goal in the play-offs)	1	46	9
Rochdale	2026–27	League Two	0	0	0	0	0	0	0	0	0	0
Rochdale	Total		138	43	2	0	2	1	9	3	151	47
Career total			302	75	8	1	3	1	22	7	335	84

== Honours ==
Salford City

- National League play-offs: 2019

Rochdale

- National League play-offs: 2026
