= 2025–26 Rochdale A.F.C. season =

English football club season

Rochdale
2025–26 season
- Chairman: Simon Gauge
- Manager: Jimmy McNulty
- Stadium: Crown Oil Arena
- National League: 2nd (promoted via the play-offs)
- FA Cup: 4th Qualifying Round
- FA Trophy: 4th Round

The 2025–26 season is Rochdale A.F.C.'s 119th in existence and their third consecutive in the National League. The club will also be competing in the FA Cup, FA Trophy and the National League Cup.

== Squad statistics ==
=== Appearances and goals ===
As of 10 May 2026

No.	Pos	Nat	Player	Total		National League		FA Cup		FA Trophy		League Cup		Play-offs	
No.	Pos	Nat	Player	Apps	Goals	Apps	Goals	Apps	Goals	Apps	Goals	Apps	Goals	Apps	Goals
1	GK	(England) ENG	Oliver Whatmuff	41	0	39+0	0	0+0	0	0+0	0	0+0	0	2+0	0
2	DF	(England) ENG	Kyron Gordon	48	7	45+0	7	1+0	0	0+0	0	0+0	0	2+0	0
3	DF	(Democratic Republic of the Congo) COD	David Tutonda	15	0	1+9	0	0+0	0	2+0	0	1+2	0	0+0	0
4	MF	(England) ENG	Ryan East	50	6	42+2	6	1+0	0	0+0	0	2+1	0	2+0	0
5	DF	(England) ENG	Liam Hogan	11	0	5+0	0	0+0	0	2+0	0	4+0	0	0+0	0
6	DF	(England) ENG	Ethan Ebanks-Landell	46	2	41+2	2	1+0	0	0+0	0	0+0	0	2+0	0
7	MF	(Tanzania) TAN	Tarryn Allarakhia	35	2	20+10	2	0+0	0	2+0	0	2+1	0	0+0	0
8	MF	(England) ENG	Harvey Gilmour	41	3	36+2	3	1+0	0	0+0	0	0+0	0	2+0	0
9	FW	(England) ENG	Emmanuel Dieseruvwe	43	28	36+4	26	1+0	1	0+0	0	0+0	0	2+0	1
10	FW	(England) ENG	Devante Rodney	47	10	37+6	9	1+0	0	0+0	0	1+0	0	2+0	1
11	MF	(France) FRA	Anthony Gomez Mancini	8	1	0+3	0	0+1	0	0+2	0	1+1	1	0+0	0
12	FW	(England) ENG	Levi Amantchi	20	2	2+12	0	0+1	0	0+1	1	3+1	1	0+0	0
12	MF	(England) ENG	Luke Hannant	10	2	5+3	2	0+0	0	0+0	0	0+0	0	2+0	0
13	GK	(England) ENG	Ben Winterbottom	2	0	2+0	0	0+0	0	0+0	0	0+0	0	0+0	0
14	DF	(England) ENG	Tobi Adebayo-Rowling	39	2	32+2	2	1+0	0	0+0	0	2+0	0	2+0	0
16	MF	(England) ENG	Casey Pettit	48	2	10+30	2	0+0	0	2+0	0	4+0	0	0+2	0
17	MF	(England) ENG	Joe Pritchard	26	2	11+10	2	0+0	0	0+1	0	1+1	0	0+2	0
18	MF	(England) ENG	Aidan Barlow	42	3	27+10	3	1+0	0	1+0	0	2+0	0	1+0	0
19	MF	(England) ENG	Jake Burger	22	2	7+9	0	0+0	0	2+0	0	1+3	2	0+0	0
20	GK	(England) ENG	Tom Myles	7	0	1+0	0	0+0	0	2+0	0	4+0	0	0+0	0
21	MF	(Scotland) SCO	Connor McBride	37	4	12+18	3	0+1	0	1+1	0	3+1	1	0+0	0
22	DF	(England) ENG	Dan Moss	46	2	20+18	2	0+1	0	2+0	0	4+0	0	1+0	0
23	DF	(England) ENG	Bryce Hosannah	8	0	0+5	0	0+0	0	1+1	0	0+1	0	0+0	0
25	MF	(England) ENG	Jack Griffiths	4	0	1+0	0	0+0	0	0+0	0	0+3	0	0+0	0
25	GK	(England) ENG	Nathan Broome	4	0	4+0	0	0+0	0	0+0	0	0+0	0	0+0	0
25	DF	(England) ENG	Callum Perry	26	0	24+0	0	0+0	0	0+0	0	0+0	0	2+0	0
27	MF	(England) ENG	Liam Humbles	6	0	0+1	0	0+0	0	1+0	0	4+0	0	0+0	0
29	DF	(England) ENG	Bryant Bilongo	3	0	0+3	0	0+0	0	0+0	0	0+0	0	0+0	0
30	DF	(England) ENG	Kevin Berkoe	12	0	5+4	0	1+0	0	0+0	0	2+0	0	0+0	0
30	FW	(Netherlands) NED	Manny Duku	3	1	2+1	1	0+0	0	0+0	0	0+0	0	0+0	0
31	GK	(England) ENG	Jackson Smith	1	0	0+0	0	1+0	0	0+0	0	0+0	0	0+0	0
33	DF	(England) ENG	Sam Beckwith	24	1	18+1	1	1+0	0	0+0	0	2+0	0	0+2	0
35	DF	(England) ENG	Charlie Waller	4	0	3+0	0	0+0	0	0+1	0	0+0	0	0+0	0
36	MF	(England) ENG	Ed Francis	13	0	2+10	0	0+0	0	0+0	0	0+0	0	0+1	0
37	DF	(England) ENG	Ryan Galvin	5	0	2+2	0	0+0	0	1+0	0	0+0	0	0+0	0
37	MF	(England) ENG	John-Kymani Gordon	4	0	0+4	0	0+0	0	0+0	0	0+0	0	0+0	0
38	FW	(England) ENG	Tyler Smith	27	7	6+16	5	0+1	0	1+1	1	1+0	0	0+1	1
39	FW	(England) ENG	Matt Done	1	0	0+0	0	0+0	0	0+0	0	0+1	0	0+0	0
40	FW	(England) ENG	Ian Henderson	37	10	5+24	9	0+0	0	2+0	0	0+4	1	0+2	0

== Transfers ==
=== In ===
Date	Pos	Player	Transferred from	Fee	Ref
30 May 2025	DF	(England) Bryce Hosannah	(England) AFC Fylde	Undisclosed	
13 June 2025	DF	(England) Dan Moss	(England) Woking	Undisclosed	
27 June 2025	MF	(England) Liam Humbles	(England) Salford City	Undisclosed	
2 July 2025	MF	(France) Anthony Gomez-Mancini	(England) Hartlepool United	Undisclosed	
3 July 2025	DF	(Democratic Republic of the Congo) David Tutonda	(England) Morcambe	Undisclosed	
4 July 2025	FW	(England) Emmanuel Dieseruvwe	(England) Hartlepool United	Undisclosed	
7 July 2025	MF	(England) Casey Pettit	(England) Maidenhead United	Undisclosed	
10 July 2025	MF	(England) Joe Pritchard	(England) Oldham Athletic	Undisclosed	
31 July 2025	GK	(England) Tom Myles	(England) Manchester United	Undisclosed	
3 October 2025	FW	(England) Tyler Smith	(England) Bradford City	Undisclosed	
15 January 2026	DF	(England) Bryant Bilongo	(England) Bristol Rovers	Undisclosed	
15 January 2026	FW	(Netherlands) Manny Duku	(England) Tamworth	Undisclosed	
10 February 2026	MF	(England) Ed Francis	(England) Exeter City	Undisclosed	
21 March 2026	MF	(England) Luke Hannant	(England) Oldham Athletic	Undisclosed	

=== Out ===
Date	Pos	Player	Transferred to	Fee	Ref
8 July 2025	DF	(England) Finlay Armstrong	(Republic of Ireland) Waterford	Undisclosed	
24 February 2026	DF	(England) Liam Hogan	(England) Morecambe	Undisclosed	

=== Loaned in ===
Date	Pos	Player	Loaned from	Date until	Ref
11 July 2025	GK	(England) Oliver Whatmuff	(England) Manchester City	End of season	
25 July 2025	FW	(England) Levi Amantchi	(England) Walsall	6 January 2026	
13 September 2025	DF	(England) Kevin Berkoe	(England) Salford City	January 2026	
10 October 2025	GK	(England) Jackson Smith	(England) Barnsley	20 December 2025	
28 November 2025	DF	(England) Ryan Galvin	(England) Barnet	6 January 2026	
29 November 2025	GK	(England) Nathan Broome	(England) Bolton Wanderers	6 January 2026	
19 December 2025	DF	(England) Charlie Waller	(England) Milton Keynes Dons	17 January 2026	
15 January 2026	DF	(England) Callum Perry	(England) Coventry City	End of season	
25 March 2026	GK	(England) Ben Winterbottom	(England) Barrow	1 April 2026	
27 March 2026	MF	(England) John-Kymani Gordon	(England) Colchester United	End of season	
27 March 2026	DF	(England) Archie Baptiste	(England) Middlesbrough	End of season	

=== Loaned out ===
Date	Pos	Player	Loaned to	Date until	Ref
1 September 2025	MF	(England) Corey Edwards	(England) Stockport County	January 2026	
12 January 2026	MF	(England) Liam Humbles	(England) Altrincham	End of season	

== Pre-season and friendlies ==
Win Draw Loss Fixtures

12 July 2025	F.C. United of Manchester	0–3	Rochdale	Moston
15:00 BST		Report	Barlow 32'; Dieseruvwe 40'; Pritchard 63'	Stadium: Broadhurst Park; Attendance: 1,122

19 July 2025	Rochdale	2–0	Grimsby Town	Rochdale
15:00 BST	Dieseruvwe 23'; Rodney 90+2'	Report		Stadium: Spotland Stadium; Attendance: 1,174

23 July 2025	Chorley	1–2	Rochdale	Chorley
19:45 BST	Sampson 16'	Report	Dieseruvwe 66', 72'	Stadium: Victory Park

26 July 2025	Barrow	1–0	Rochdale	Barrow-in-Furness
15:00 BST	Hemmings 88' (pen.)	Report		Stadium: Holker Street; Attendance: 1,051

2 August 2025	Rochdale	1–1	Manchester United U21	Rochdale
15:00 BST	Adebayo-Rowling 71'	Report	Ennis 61'	Stadium: Spotland Stadium; Attendance: 1,756

== Competitions ==
Win Draw Loss Fixtures

=== Overall record ===
Competition	Starting round	Record							
Competition	Starting round	Pld	W	D	L	GF	GA	GD	Win %
National League	Matchday 1	46	33	7	6	88	41	+47	71.74
FA Cup	Fourth qualifying round	1	0	0	1	1	2	−1	0.00
FA Trophy	Third round	2	1	1	0	2	1	+1	50.00
NL Cup	First round	4	3	0	1	6	5	+1	75.00
Total		53	37	8	8	97	49	+48	69.81

Source: Soccerway

=== National League ===
==== League table ====
Pos	Team	Pld	W	D	L	GF	GA	GD	Pts	Promotion, qualification or relegation
1	York City (C, P)	46	33	9	4	114	41	+73	108	Promotion to EFL League Two
2	Rochdale (O, P)	46	33	7	6	88	41	+47	106	Qualification for National League play-off semi-finals
3	Carlisle United	46	29	8	9	87	51	+36	95	Qualification for National League play-off semi-finals
4	Boreham Wood	46	27	9	10	95	58	+37	90	Qualification for the National League play-off quarter-finals
5	Scunthorpe United	46	23	13	10	77	62	+15	82	Qualification for the National League play-off quarter-finals

Source: National League official site
Rules for classification: 1) Points; 2) Goal difference; 3) Number of goals scored; 4) Number of matches won; 5) Head-to-head results
(C) Champions; (O) Play-off winners; (P) Promoted

==== Results summary ====
Overall								Home						Away					
Pld	W	D	L	GF	GA	GD	Pts	W	D	L	GF	GA	GD	W	D	L	GF	GA	GD
46	33	7	6	88	41	+47	106	18	2	3	52	22	+30	15	5	3	36	19	+17

Last updated: pre-season.
Source: Soccerway

==== Results by round ====
Round	1	2	3	4	5	6	7	8	9	10	11	12	13	14	15	16	17	18	19	20	21	22	23	24	25	26	27	28	29	30	31	32	33	34	35	36	37	38	39	40	41	42	43	44	45	46
Ground	A	H	H	A	H	A	H	A	H	A	H	A	H	A	A	A	H	A	H	A	A	H	A	A	H	H	H	H	H	A	H	H	A	A	H	H	A	A	H	A	A	H	A	H	A	H
Result	W	W	W	L	W	W	W	W	W	W	L	W	W	D	W	L	W	W	W	W	W	L	W	W	W	W	W	W	W	D	D	W	D	W	W	W	W	L	W	D	W	L	D	W	W	D
Position	4	3	1	4	2	1	2	1	2	1	2	1	1	1	2	4	2	1	1	1	1	3	4	2	2	1	1	1	1	2	1	1	2	1	1	1	1	1	1	1	1	2	2	2	2	2

Updated to match(es) played on pre-season. Source: Soccerway
A = Away; H = Home; W = Win; D = Draw; L = Loss

==== Matches ====
9 August 2025 1	Boreham Wood	0–2	Rochdale	Borehamwood
15:00 BST		Report	Beckwith (yellow card) 26'; Dieseruvwe 49', 52', (yellow card) 60'; Tutonda (yellow card) 81'	Stadium: Meadow Park; Attendance: 1,151; Referee: Wayne Cartmel

16 August 2025 2	Rochdale	2–1	Altrincham	Rochdale
12:30 BST	Allarakhia 35'; Golden 60' (o.g.); Dieseruvwe (yellow card) 90+5'	Report	Ward 19', (yellow card) 55'; Gale (yellow card) 33'; Crawford (yellow card) 69'; Sassi (yellow card) 90+5'; Reed (yellow card) 90+5'	Stadium: Spotland Stadium; Attendance: 2,940; Referee: William Davis

20 August 2025 3	Rochdale	4–0	Gateshead	Rochdale
19:45 BST	Ebanks-Landell 13'; Dieseruvwe 43'; Rodney 70'; McBride 79'; Gordon (yellow card) 90+5'	Report	Chapman (yellow card) 45+1'; Adom (yellow card) 69'; Richardson (yellow card) 82'; Sheaf (yellow card) 90+4'	Stadium: Spotland Stadium; Attendance: 2,313; Referee: Paul Marsden

23 August 2025 4	Brackley Town	2–1	Rochdale	Brackley
15:00 BST	Haynes 14'; Dean (yellow card) 55'; Price (yellow card) 55'; Hall 60'; Brown (yellow card) 90+4'	Report	McBride 52'; Myles (yellow card) 59'; Gomez-Mancini (yellow card) 66'; Dieseruvwe (yellow card) 68'; Adebayo-Rowling (yellow card) 90+3'	Stadium: St James Park; Attendance: 1,136; Referee: Isaac Searle

25 August 2025 5	Rochdale	1–0	Sutton United	Rochdale
15:00 BST	Dieseruvwe 50'; Gilmour (yellow card) 62'	Report		Stadium: Spotland Stadium; Attendance: 2,647; Referee: Declan Brown

30 August 2025 6	Wealdstone	1–3	Rochdale	Ruislip
15:00 BST	Mussa (yellow card) 38'; Massey 76'	Report	Barlow 4'; Ebanks-Landell (yellow card) 24'; Dieseruvwe (yellow card) 30', (goal) 46'; Rodney 40'; Gilmour (yellow card) 60'	Stadium: Grosvenor Vale; Attendance: 1,365; Referee: Lee Swabey

6 September 2025 7	Rochdale	2–0	Braintree Town	Rochdale
15:00 BST	Dieseruvwe 26', 32'	Report		Stadium: Spotland Stadium; Attendance: 2,562; Referee: James Westgate

13 September 2025 8	Truro City	0–1	Rochdale	Truro
15:00 BST	Sanders (yellow card) 14'; Donnellan (yellow card) 65'	Report	Gordon 11', (yellow card) 26'; Dieseruvwe (yellow card) 76'	Stadium: Truro City Stadium; Attendance: 2,201; Referee: Richie Watkins

20 September 2025 P	Rochdale	P–P	Southend United	Rochdale
17:30 BST				Stadium: Spotland Stadium
Note: Postponed due to a waterlogged pitch.

23 September 2025 9	Rochdale	4–1	Solihull Moors	Rochdale
19:45 BST	East 8', 17', (yellow card) 61'; Rodney 20'; Beckwith 50'; Gordon (yellow card) 84'; Petit (yellow card) 90+1'	Report	Wakeling (yellow card) 6'; Osborne (yellow card) 46'; McFarlane 58'	Stadium: Spotland Stadium; Attendance: 2,128; Referee: Steven Copeland

27 September 2025 10	Carlisle United	0–2	Rochdale	Carlisle
15:00 BST	Mugabi (yellow card) 58'; Linney (yellow card) 69'	Report	Dieseruvwe 5', 56'; Adebayo-Rowling (yellow card) 61'; Moss (yellow card) 81'	Stadium: Brunton Park; Attendance: 8,014; Referee: Ollie Yates

1 October 2025 11	Rochdale	1–2	FC Halifax Town	Rochdale
19:45 BST	Barlow (yellow card) 58'; Rodney 60', (yellow card) 76'; Gordon (yellow card) 80'; Moss (yellow card) 85'	Report	Harris (yellow card) 37'; Hmami 41', 54'; Hugill (yellow card) 43'; Cooke (yellow card) 90+5'	Stadium: Spotland Stadium; Attendance: 3,466; Referee: Scott Oldham

4 October 2025 12	Forest Green Rovers	0–1	Rochdale	Nailsworth
15:00 BST	Knowles (yellow card) 45'; Pemberton (yellow card) 90+1'	Report	Moss (yellow card) 37'; Gordon 44'; Gilmour (yellow card) 45'; Ebanks-Landell (yellow card) 83'	Stadium: The New Lawn; Attendance: 2,482; Referee: Tom Reeves

18 October 2025 13	Rochdale	3–0	Yeovil Town	Rochdale
15:00 BST	Dieseruvwe 5', 30', (yellow card) 12'; East 43'	Report	Pendleton (yellow card) 45+2'; McCormick (yellow card) 50'; Jarvis (yellow card) 86'; Williams (yellow card) 86'	Stadium: Spotland Stadium; Attendance: 2,716; Referee: Jamie O'Connor

25 October 2025 14	Woking	0–0	Rochdale	Woking
15:00 BST	Drewe (yellow card) 78'; Jääskeläinen (yellow card) 83'	Report	Ebanks-Landell (yellow card) 89'	Stadium: Kingfield Stadium; Attendance: 2,979; Referee: Martin Ross

4 November 2025 P	Rochdale	P–P	Scunthorpe United	Rochdale
19:45 GMT				Stadium: Spotland Stadium
Note: Postponed due to a waterlogged pitch.

8 November 2025 15	Boston United	1–3	Rochdale	Boston
15:00 GMT	Lankshear 82'; John-Lewis (yellow card) 85'; Lavinier (yellow card) 85'	Report	Rodney 42', (penalty missed) 50'; Smith 69', 87'	Stadium: Boston Community Stadium; Attendance: 1,971; Referee: Paul Marsden

11 November 2025 16	York City	4–1	Rochdale	York
19:45 GMT	Pearce 35', 59'; Stones 46', 49'	Report	Berkoe (yellow card) 28'; Adebayo-Rowling 39'; Pettit (yellow card) 81'	Stadium: York Community Stadium; Attendance: 6,643; Referee: Matthew Corlett

15 November 2025 17	Rochdale	1–0	Aldershot Town	Rochdale
15:03 GMT	Gilmour 65'; Barlow (yellow card) 88'	Report	Anderson (yellow card) 55'; Jones (yellow card) 90+3'; Henry (yellow card) 90+3'	Stadium: Spotland Stadium; Attendance: 2,295; Referee: Zac Kennard-Kettle

22 November 2025 18	Tamworth	1–2	Rochdale	Tamworth
12:30 GMT	Cockerill-Mollett (yellow card) 69'; Creaney 74'; Tonks (yellow card) 90+3'	Report	Gilmour (yellow card) 5'; Gordon 41'; Dieseruvwe 71' (pen.); Amantchi (yellow card) 90+5'; Whatmuff (yellow card) 90+5'	Stadium: The Lamb Ground; Attendance: 1,067; Referee: Dale Baines

29 November 2025 19	Rochdale	2–0	Eastleigh	Rochdale
15:00 GMT	Humphries 54' (o.g.); Allarakhia 73'	Report	Lundstram (yellow card) 81'	Stadium: Spotland Stadium; Attendance: 2,219; Referee: Gareth Rhodes

6 December 2025 P	Rochdale	P–P	Boreham Wood	Rochdale
15:00 GMT				Stadium: Spotland Stadium
Note: Postponed due to the progression of Boreham Wood in the FA Cup.

6 December 2025 A	Rochdale	A–A	Southend United	Rochdale
15:00 GMT	East 53'; Allarakhia 74'	Report	Coker 6'; Boyes (yellow card) 57'; Miley (yellow card) 58'	Stadium: Spotland Stadium; Referee: Andrew Humphries
Note: Abandoned due to a waterlogged pitch.

20 December 2025 20	Altrincham	0–3	Rochdale	Altrincham
19:45 GMT		Report	Pritchard 17'; McBride 35', (yellow card) 45'; Smith 74'	Stadium: Moss Lane; Attendance: 3,332; Referee: Peter Wright

26 December 2025 21	Morecambe	1–2	Rochdale	Morecambe
15:00 GMT	Nolan 47'; Lewis (yellow card) 71'; Francillette (yellow card) 85'	Report	Pritchard (yellow card) 27', (penalty missed) 41'; Henderson 45'; Ebanks-Landell (yellow card) 78'; Gilmour 80'	Stadium: Mazuma Mobile Stadium; Attendance: 4,266; Referee: Aaron Jackson

30 December 2025 22	Rochdale	1–2	Hartlepool United	Accrington
19:45 GMT	Henderson 79'	Report	Kouogun 21'; Charman 28'	Stadium: Crown Ground; Attendance: 2,026; Referee: William Davis

3 January 2026 P	Rochdale	P–P	Brackley Town	Accrington
15:00 GMT				Stadium: Crown Ground
Note: Postponed due to a frozen pitch.

17 January 2026 23	Gateshead	0–2	Rochdale	Gateshead
15:00 GMT	Storey (yellow card) 14'; Home (yellow card) 84'	Report	Duku 32'; East 87'	Stadium: Gateshead International Stadium; Attendance: 887; Referee: Ross Joyce

21 January 2026 24	Solihull Moors	0–1	Rochdale	Solihull
19:45 GMT		Report	Pritchard 90+4'	Stadium: Damson Park; Attendance: 1,015; Referee: Alan Dale

24 January 2026 25	Rochdale	2–0	Truro City	Rochdale
15:00 GMT	Smith 3'; Henderson (penalty missed) 33' 35'	Report		Stadium: Spotland Stadium; Attendance: 3,239; Referee: Paul Marsden

27 January 2026 26	Rochdale	2–1	Southend United	Rochdale
19:45 GMT	Gordon 44', (yellow card) 90+6'; Gilmour 90'	Report	Scott-Morriss 40'	Stadium: Spotland Stadium; Attendance: 2,435; Referee: Seb Stockbridge

31 January 2026 P	Southend United	P–P	Rochdale	Southend-on-Sea
15:00 GMT				Stadium: Roots Hall
Note: Postponed due to the progression of Southend United in the FA Trophy.

3 February 2026 27	Rochdale	4–1	Boreham Wood	Rochdale
19:45 GMT	Rodney 6'; Dieseruvwe 29', 50'; Whatmuff (yellow card) 70'; Henderson 75'	Report	Bush (yellow card) 65'; Brunt 71' (pen.)	Stadium: Spotland Stadium; Attendance: 2,356; Referee: Simon Mather

7 February 2026 28	Rochdale	1–0	Carlisle United	Rochdale
15:00 GMT	Moss 41'; Barlow (yellow card) 80'	Report	Galvin (yellow card) 41'; Embleton (yellow card) 83'	Stadium: Spotland Stadium; Attendance: 4,725; Referee: Charles Breakspear

11 February 2026 29	Rochdale	2–1	Forest Green Rovers	Rochdale
19:45 GMT	Dieseruvwe 2', 64'; Gilmour (yellow card) 56'	Report	McAllister 43'; Buyabu (yellow card) 84'	Stadium: Spotland Stadium; Attendance: 2,646; Referee: Richard Eley

14 February 2026 30	Yeovil Town	1–1	Rochdale	Yeovil
15:00 GMT	Cousin-Dawson 15'; Jarvis (red card) 69'	Report	Barlow 13'	Stadium: Huish Park; Attendance: 3,161; Referee: Niall Smith

17 February 2026 31	Rochdale	1–1	Scunthorpe United	Rochdale
19:45 GMT	East 32'	Report	Roberts 17'; Evans (yellow card) 37'; Westbrooke (yellow card) 49'; Mahady (yellow card) 56'; Ubaezuonu (yellow card) 83'	Stadium: Spotland Stadium; Attendance: 3,615; Referee: Darren Drysdale

21 February 2026 32	Rochdale	3–0	Woking	Rochdale
15:00 GMT	Gordon (yellow card) 24', (goal) 27'; Dieseruvwe 35', 74' (pen.); Moss (yellow card) 51'	Report	Gbodé (yellow card) 61'; Drewe (yellow card) 73'; O. Akinola (yellow card) 75'; T. Akinola (yellow card) 81'	Stadium: Spotland Stadium; Attendance: 2,826; Referee: Steven Copeland

24 February 2026 33	FC Halifax Town	2–2	Rochdale	Halifax
19:45 GMT	Hmami (yellow card) 64'; Johnson (yellow card) 70'; Harris 87'; Lavery 90+2'; Kawa (yellow card) 90+5'	Report	Rodney 15'; McBride (yellow card) 72'; Mills 84' (o.g.)	Stadium: The Shay; Attendance: 2,749; Referee: Declan Brown

28 February 2026 34	Aldershot Town	0–2	Rochdale	Aldershot
15:00 GMT	Henry (yellow card) 27'; Hargreaves (yellow card) 67'	Report	Dieseruvwe 17', 50'; Moss (yellow card) 42'; Gilmour (yellow card) 53'	Stadium: Recreation Ground; Attendance: 2,822; Referee: Lewis Sandoe

3 March 2026 35	Rochdale	3–2	Brackley Town	Rochdale
19:45 GMT	Dieseruvwe 3', 60'; Gordon 71'	Report	Lilly 39', 90+4'	Stadium: Spotland Stadium; Attendance: 2,280; Referee: Gareth Thomas

7 March 2026 36	Rochdale	1–0	Boston United	Rochdale
15:00 GMT	Gordon (yellow card) 80'; Smith 82'	Report	Cursons (yellow card) 23'; Lavinier (yellow card) 68'; Grimes (yellow card) 72'	Stadium: Spotland Stadium; Attendance: 3,296; Referee: Zac Kennard-Kettle

14 March 2026 37	Eastleigh	1–3	Rochdale	Eastleigh
17:30 GMT	Maher (yellow card) 68'; Tabor 88'	Report	Dieseruvwe 16'; Pettit 61'; Ebanks-Landell 69'	Stadium: Ten Acres; Attendance: 2,541; Referee: Harry Wager

17 March 2026 38	Southend United	3–2	Rochdale	Southend-on-Sea
19:45 GMT	Dallas 3', (yellow card) 19'; Golding 17'; Hopper 27'	Report	Gordon (yellow card) 17'; Dieseruvwe 20'; Pettit 55', (yellow card) 76'	Stadium: Roots Hall; Attendance: 7,259; Referee: Charles Breakspear

21 March 2026 39	Rochdale	3–2	Tamworth	Rochdale
15:00 GMT	East 13'; Moss 37'; Dieseruvwe (penalty missed) 45+5'; Henderson 80'	Report	Creaney 22'; Lynch 33'	Stadium: Spotland Stadium; Attendance: 3,122; Referee: Kavan Hurn

25 March 2026 40	Scunthorpe United	2–2	Rochdale	Scunthorpe
19:45 GMT	Rowley (yellow card) 53'; Roberts 60'; Beestin 87'	Report	Hannant 31'; Barlow 51'; Gordon (yellow card) 88'	Stadium: Glanford Park; Attendance: 4,898; Referee: Andrew Miller

28 March 2026 41	Sutton United	1–2	Rochdale	Sutton
15:00 GMT	Simper (yellow card) 58'; Taylor (yellow card) 71'; Bell 78'; Muller (yellow card) 90+4' (yellow-red card) 90+9'	Report	Henderson (yellow card) 49', (goal) 90+7'; Ebanks-Landell (yellow card) 66'; Rodney 89'	Stadium: Gander Green Lane; Attendance: 2,520; Referee: Ben Atkinson

3 April 2026 42	Rochdale	2–4	Morecambe	Rochdale
19:45 BST	Barlow 19'; Hannant (yellow card) 50'; Henderson 78'; Gordon (yellow card) 90+2'	Report	Payne 32', 66'; Lewis (yellow card) 43'; Nolan 72'; Tollitt 90+8'	Stadium: Spotland Stadium; Attendance: 4,183; Referee: Declan Bourne

6 April 2026 43	Hartlepool United	0–0	Rochdale	Hartlepool
19:45 BST	Daly (yellow card) 87'	Report	Gilmour (yellow card) 40'; Hannant (yellow card) 85'; Henderson (yellow card) 90'	Stadium: Victoria Park; Attendance: 4,203; Referee: Dale Baines

11 April 2026 44	Rochdale	2–1	Wealdstone	Rochdale
17:30 BST	K. Gordon (yellow card) 41'; Henderson 77'; J. Gordon (yellow card) 82'; Hannant 90'	Report	Woodman 58'; Hutchinson (yellow card) 69'	Stadium: Spotland Stadium; Attendance: 3,021; Referee: Jacob Miles

18 April 2026 45	Braintree Town	1–2	Rochdale	Braintree
15:00 BST	Clarridge (yellow card) 51'; Francis-Clarke (yellow card) 53'; Akinde 90+1'	Report	Barlow 36'; Gilmour (yellow card) 56'; Hannant (yellow card) 59'; Dieseruvwe 90+9'	Stadium: Cressing Road; Attendance: 1,309; Referee: Abigail Byrne

25 April 2026 46	Rochdale	1–1	York City	Rochdale
12:30 BST	East (yellow card) 35'; Gilmour (yellow card) 59'; Pritchard (yellow card) 90+2'; Dieseruvwe 90+5', (yellow card) 90+6'; Smith (yellow card) 90+6'	Report	Banks (yellow card) 23'; Stones 90+13', (yellow card) 90+13'	Stadium: Spotland Stadium; Attendance: 7,221; Referee: Will Finnie

==== Play-offs ====
3 May 2026 SF	Rochdale	2–1	Scunthorpe United	Rochdale
15:00 BST	Evans 3' (o.g.); Adebayo-Rowling (yellow card) 34'; Rodney 57'	Report	Horton (yellow card) 19'; Howe (yellow card) 49', (goal) 81'; Denton (yellow card) 69'; Scales (yellow card) 90+1'; Evans (yellow card) 90+5'	Stadium: Spotland Stadium; Attendance: 7,552; Referee: Jamie O'Connor

10 May 2026 F	Boreham Wood	2–2 (a.e.t.) (1–3 p)	Rochdale	London
15:00 BST	Rush 22'; Bush (yellow card) 57'; Abdulmalik 69'	Report	Smith 78'; Dieseruvwe 90+7'; Pritchard (yellow card) 120+1'	Stadium: Wembley Stadium; Attendance: 13,814; Referee: Andrew Humphries
	Penalties
	Reynolds (penalty missed); Sousa (penalty scored); Rush (penalty missed); Coxe (penalty missed)		Beckwith (penalty scored); Francis (penalty scored); Perry (penalty scored)
Note: See also 2026 National League play-off final

=== FA Cup ===
11 October 2025 Q4	Rochdale	1–2	York City	Rochdale
15:00 BST	Dieseruvwe 71'	Report	Newby 56', 89'	Stadium: Spotland Stadium; Attendance: 2,981; Referee: Declan Bourne

=== FA Trophy ===
13 December 2025 3	Leamington	0–1	Rochdale	Leamington Spa
15:00 BST		Report	Amantchi 51'	Stadium: New Windmill Ground; Attendance: 421; Referee: Niall Smith

10 January 2026 P	Tamworth	P–P	Rochdale	Tamworth
15:00 BST				Stadium: The Lamb Ground
Note: Postponed due to an unplayable pitch.

13 January 2026 4	Tamworth	1–1 (7–6 p)	Rochdale	Tamworth
19:45 BST	Acquaye 72'	Report	Smith 44'	Stadium: The Lamb Ground; Attendance: 534; Referee: Richard Holmes
	Penalties
	Mols (penalty scored); Lissimore (penalty scored); Lynch (penalty scored); Ponticelli (penalty scored); Donkor (penalty missed); Cullinane-Liburd (penalty scored); Tonks (penalty scored); Curley (penalty scored)		Barlow (penalty scored); McBride (penalty scored); Burger (penalty missed); Pettit (penalty scored); Gomez-Mancini (penalty scored); Tutonda (penalty scored); Pritchard (penalty scored); Waller (penalty missed)

=== National League Cup ===
Pos	Div	Team	Pld	W	PW	PL	L	GF	GA	GD	Pts	Qualification
1	NL	Tamworth	4	4	0	0	0	12	1	+11	12	Advance to knockout stage
2	NL	Brackley Town	4	3	0	1	0	7	3	+4	10	Advance to knockout stage
3	NL	Rochdale	4	3	0	0	1	6	5	+1	9	
4	NL	Solihull Moors	4	2	1	0	1	6	3	+3	8	
5	ACA	Everton U21	4	1	1	0	2	4	5	−1	5	

Source: Premier League

13 August 2025 1	Rochdale	2–1	Burnley U21	Rochdale
13:00 BST	Griffiths (yellow card) 48'; Henderson 56'; Amantchi 78'	Report	Ryan (yellow card) 58'; McMahon-Brown 75'; Blackie (yellow card) 88'	Stadium: Spotland Stadium; Attendance: 1,452; Referee: Aaron Jackson

16 September 2025 1	Rochdale	3–2	Blackburn Rovers U21	Rochdale
19:00 BST	McBride 7'; Gomez-Mancini 53'; Burger 76'; Moss (yellow card) 88'	Report	Houghton 12'; Wood 33'; Tyjon (yellow card) 42'; Atcheson (yellow card) 45+1'	Stadium: Spotland Stadium; Attendance: 1,135; Referee: Gareth Thomas

28 October 2025 1	Rochdale	0–2	Manchester United U21	Rochdale
19:00 BST	Pettit (yellow card) 30'	Report	Obi 11'; Scanlon 90+3'	Stadium: Spotland Stadium; Attendance: 2,960; Referee: Aaron Jackson

25 November 2025 1	Rochdale	1–0	Everton U21	Rochdale
19:00 BST	Burger 51'	Report		Stadium: Spotland Stadium; Attendance: 635; Referee: Matthew Scholes
