= Oliver Whatmuff =

English footballer (born 2007)

Ollie Whatmuff
Personal information
- Full name: Oliver Jackson Whatmuff
- Date of birth: 6 November 2007 (age 19)
- Place of birth: Lancaster, England
- Height: 1.85 m (6 ft 1 in)
- Position: Goalkeeper

Team information
- Current team: Stockport County (on loan from Manchester City)
- Number: 1

Youth career
- 2016–2025: Manchester City

Senior career*
Years	Team	Apps	(Gls)
2025–	Manchester City	0	(0)
2025–2026	→ Rochdale (loan)	39	(0)
2026–	→ Stockport County (loan)	13	(0)

International career^{‡}
2023–2024	England U17	5	(0)
2024–2025	England U18	6	(0)
2025–2026	England U19	5	(0)
2026–	England U20	1	(0)
- * Club domestic league appearances and goals as of 17:10, 7 November 2026 (UTC) ‡ National team caps and goals as of 12:35, 25 September 2026 (UTC)

Oliver Jackson Whatmuff (born 6 November 2007) is an English professional footballer who plays as a goalkeeper for EFL League One club Stockport County, on loan from Premier League club Manchester City. He is an England youth international.

== Club career ==
=== Manchester City ===
Born in Lancaster, Lancashire, Whatmuff joined the Manchester City academy set-up in the under-eight age group. Having progressed through the academy he played eight games in Premier League 2 during the 2024-25 season, as well as seven matches in the UEFA Youth League. He signed a professional contract with the club in August 2025. That summer, he joined National League club Rochdale on a season-long loan.

While on loan to Rochdale during the 2025-26 season, Whatmuff helped the club earn promotion from the National League by saving two penalties in the play-off final shoot-out against Boreham Wood on 10 May 2026. He was also named on the National League team of the season, having kept 18 clean sheets throughout the season.

On 1 July 2026, Whatmuff joined League One club Stockport County on a season-long loan deal, brought to the club by Jimmy McNulty whom had managed him the previous season at Rochdale. He made his debut for the club on 8 August 2026, in a 1–1 draw with Doncaster Rovers in the EFL Cup which Stockport lost on penalties.

== International career ==
Whatmuff has played for England at under-17, under-18 and under-19 level. He was part of the England squad for the 2024 UEFA European Under-17 Championship and started in their quarter-final defeat against Italy.

== Career statistics ==
As of match played 31 October 2026

Appearances and goals by club, season and competition
Club	Season	League			FA Cup		EFL Cup		Other		Total	
Club	Season	Division	Apps	Goals	Apps	Goals	Apps	Goals	Apps	Goals	Apps	Goals
Manchester City U21	2024–25	—			—		—		1 (Note: Appearances in EFL Trophy)	0	1	0
Manchester City	2025–26	Premier League	0	0	0	0	0	0	0	0	0	0
Manchester City	2026–27	Premier League	0	0	0	0	0	0	0	0	0	0
Manchester City	Total		0	0	0	0	0	0	0	0	0	0
Rochdale (loan)	2025–26	National League	39	0	—		—		2 (Note: Appearances in National League play-offs)	0	41	0
Stockport County (loan)	2026–27	League One	13	0	0	0	1	0	0	0	14	0
Career total			52	0	0	0	1	0	3	0	56	0

== Honours ==
Rochdale

- National League play-offs: 2026

Individual

- National League Team of the Season: 2025–26
