= Morgan Gibbs-White =

English footballer (born 2000)

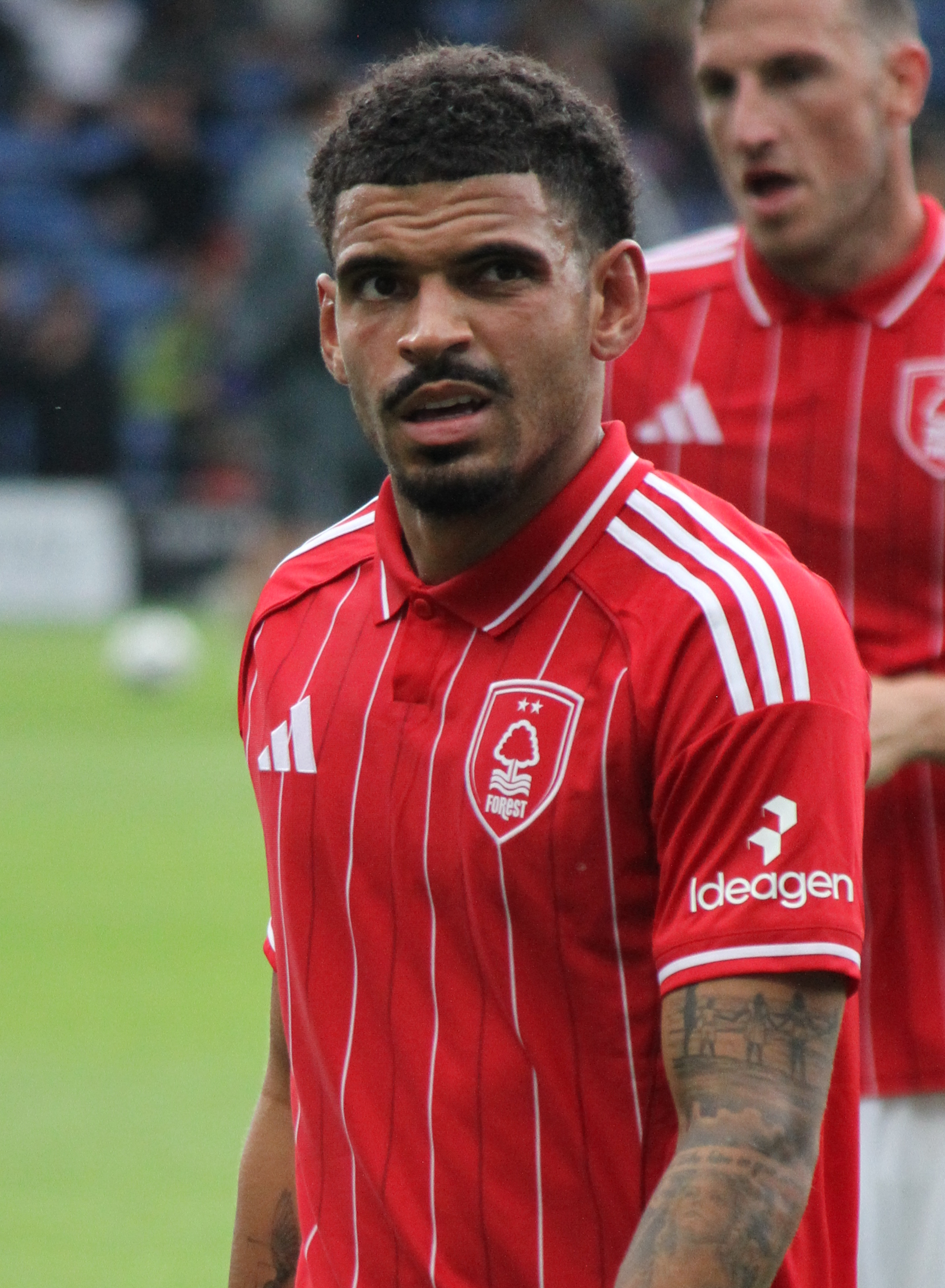
- Gibbs-White playing for Nottingham Forest in 2025

Personal information
- Full name: Morgan Anthony Gibbs-White
- Date of birth: 27 January 2000 (age 26)
- Place of birth: Stafford, England
- Height: 5 ft 7 in (1.71 m)
- Position: Attacking midfielder

Team information
- Current team: Nottingham Forest
- Number: 10

Youth career
- 2008–2017: Wolverhampton Wanderers

Senior career*
Years	Team	Apps	(Gls)
2017–2022	Wolverhampton Wanderers	68	(1)
2020–2021	→ Swansea City (loan)	5	(1)
2021–2022	→ Sheffield United (loan)	35	(11)
2022–	Nottingham Forest	151	(33)

International career^{‡}
2016	England U16	1	(1)
2016–2017	England U17	14	(4)
2018	England U18	2	(0)
2018–2019	England U19	10	(1)
2019–2023	England U21	18	(3)
2024–	England	10	(0)
Medal record
Representing England
UEFA European Under-21 Championship
Winner	2023
FIFA U-17 World Cup
Winner	2017
- * Club domestic league appearances and goals as of 17:03, 31 October 2026 (UTC) ‡ National team caps and goals as of 16:16, 7 October 2026 (UTC)

Morgan Anthony Gibbs-White (born 27 January 2000) is an English professional footballer who plays as an attacking midfielder for Premier League club Nottingham Forest and the England national team.

Gibbs-White began his career with Wolverhampton Wanderers, making his first-team debut in 2017 and making 88 appearances for the club. After a short loan at Swansea City, he came to prominence during a loan at Sheffield United, which was followed by a club record transfer to newly promoted Nottingham Forest in 2022.

== Early and personal life ==
Morgan Anthony Gibbs-White was born on 27 January 2000 in Stafford, Staffordshire, where he was raised. He attended Sir Graham Balfour School in his hometown and later Thomas Telford School in Telford, Shropshire, where he was coached by Des Lyttle. Gibbs-White is of Jamaican descent.

On 13 May 2025, he was banned from driving for six months after pleading guilty to several speeding offences. He was also fined £3,996.

== Club career ==
=== Wolverhampton Wanderers ===
==== Early career ====
Gibbs-White joined Wolverhampton Wanderers aged eight and played for the club's academy at all age groups. He made his first team debut, aged 16, as a 62nd-minute substitute for Joe Mason in a 2–0 win over Premier League side Stoke City in the FA Cup third round on 7 January 2017. He made his first league appearance on 14 February 2017 in a 1–0 home defeat in the Championship against Wigan Athletic.

In January 2018, it was announced that Gibbs-White had signed a contract that would keep him at the club until summer 2022. He made his first Premier League appearance in the opening home match of the 2018–19 season against Everton as a late substitute. He also came on as a substitute in the home match against Tottenham Hotspur on 4 November 2018; despite the team losing 3–2, his performance received particular praise.

The midfielder got his first start in the Premier League in the home game against Chelsea on 5 December 2018, in which he provided the assist for Wolves' first goal by Raúl Jiménez in a 2–1 win. On 15 August 2019, he scored his first goal for Wolves, on his 57th senior appearance for the club, in a 4–0 second leg win against the Armenian team FC Pyunik in a UEFA Europa League qualifier.

During the COVID-19 pandemic, Gibbs-White was disciplined by Wolves for having breached government rules by attending a party in London in May 2020.

==== 2020–2022 ====
On 25 August 2020, Gibbs-White signed a new three-year contract with Wolves before moving on loan to Championship club Swansea City for the 2020–21 season. He scored his first goal for Swansea in a 1–0 win against Preston North End on 12 September. Gibbs-White fractured his foot in Swansea's home game against Millwall on 3 October, leading to him missing three months of the season. He did not make another appearance for Swansea after the Millwall game until coming on as an 85th minute substitute in the 2–1 home win over Watford on 2 January 2021.

Gibbs-White was recalled from his loan at Swansea City by Wolves on 6 January 2021. He scored his first Premier League goal (in his 41st appearance in the competition) on 9 May, a late winner in a 2–1 victory over Brighton & Hove Albion at Molineux.

Gibbs-White joined Sheffield United on loan for the 2021–22 season on 31 August 2021, having made three appearances for Wolves in the early weeks of the season (including a goal in the EFL Cup against Nottingham Forest). He scored on his debut for Sheffield United against Peterborough United on 11 September 2021 in a 6–2 win, and again in his second Sheffield United appearance (against Preston North End) on 14 September, a game which ended as a 2–2 draw.

On 17 May 2022, Gibbs-White scored a goal in a 2–1 away win over Nottingham Forest in the Football League play-offs semi-final second leg; however, he missed a crucial penalty which granted the opponents a 3–2 victory in the penalty shoot-out and qualification to the final.

His twelve goals and ten assists saw him named as Sheffield United's Player of the Year for the 2021–22 season.

=== Nottingham Forest ===
On 19 August 2022, Gibbs-White signed for newly promoted Premier League club Nottingham Forest on a five-year contract, for a reported club record transfer fee of £25 million with another potential £17 million in add-ons. He scored his first goal for the club on 5 November 2022 in a 2–2 home draw with Brentford. On 28 May 2023, Gibbs-White was voted Nottingham Forest Player of the Season.

During the 2023–24 season, Gibbs-White recorded ten Premier League assists and scored five goals, including the winning goal at home to Manchester United on 30 December 2023. On 1 February 2025, he scored a goal in his 100th match for the club in a 7–0 victory over Brighton.

On 10 July, Sky Sports News reported that Tottenham Hotspur had triggered Gibbs-White's £60 million release clause in order to sign him, and that he was due to undergo a medical with them. The following day, it was reported that Nottingham Forest were consulting their legal team about potential legal action over what they believed was an illegal approach to Gibbs-White, and a potential breach in a confidentiality agreement over his release clause. On 26 July, Gibbs-White signed a new three-year contract with Nottingham Forest. Later that year, on 22 November, he netted a goal in a 3–0 away win over Liverpool, securing his club's first back-to-back wins at Anfield in 62 years.

On 16 April 2026, Gibbs-White scored the only goal in a 1–0 victory over Porto in the Europa League quarter-final second leg, sealing his club's place in the semi-finals by winning 2–1 on aggregate. Three days later, he netted his first career hat-trick in a 4–1 win over Burnley. A month later, on 4 May, he sustained a head injury after colliding with Chelsea goalkeeper Robert Sánchez during a 3–1 away win, requiring stitches above his right eye. He concluded the 2025–26 season with a personal-best tally of 15 Premier League goals, finishing as his club's top scorer.

== International career ==
Gibbs-White was part of the England team that won the 2017 FIFA U-17 World Cup in India. He scored twice in the tournament, against the United States in a 4–1 win in the quarter-finals, and once in the final, which England won 5–2 against Spain. In December 2017, Rhian Brewster revealed in an interview with The Guardian that Gibbs-White was racially abused by a Spanish player during the final, with the FA reporting the incident to FIFA.

On 27 May 2019, Gibbs-White was included in England's 23-man squad for the 2019 UEFA European Under-21 Championship in Italy. He made his debut for that age group during the 3–3 draw with Croatia at the San Marino Stadium on 24 June, playing the final 17 minutes in place of James Maddison.

Gibbs-White was included in the England squad for the 2023 UEFA European Under-21 Championship. He scored the opening goal of their semi-final victory over Israel and also started in the final before being sent off as England beat Spain to win the tournament.

On 29 August 2024, Gibbs-White was called up to the senior squad by interim England manager Lee Carsley for the UEFA Nations League matches against the Republic of Ireland and Finland. He made his senior debut on 7 September, coming off the bench in the 76th minute in England's 2–0 win against Ireland.

== Career statistics ==
=== Club ===
As of match played 31 October 2026

Appearances and goals by club, season and competition
Club	Season	League			FA Cup		EFL Cup		Europe		Other		Total	
Club	Season	Division	Apps	Goals	Apps	Goals	Apps	Goals	Apps	Goals	Apps	Goals	Apps	Goals
Wolverhampton Wanderers U23	2016–17	—			—		—		—		4 (Note: Appearances in EFL Trophy)	0	4	0
Wolverhampton Wanderers	2016–17	Championship	7	0	1	0	0	0	—		—		8	0
Wolverhampton Wanderers	2017–18	Championship	13	0	2	0	0	0	—		—		15	0
Wolverhampton Wanderers	2018–19	Premier League	26	0	3	0	2	0	—		—		31	0
Wolverhampton Wanderers	2019–20	Premier League	7	0	1	0	1	0	7 (Note: Appearances in UEFA Europa League)	1	—		16	1
Wolverhampton Wanderers	2020–21	Premier League	11	1	2	0	—		—		—		13	1
Wolverhampton Wanderers	2021–22	Premier League	2	0	—		1	1	—		—		3	1
Wolverhampton Wanderers	2022–23	Premier League	2	0	—		—		—		—		2	0
Wolverhampton Wanderers	Total		68	1	9	0	4	1	7	1	—		88	3
Swansea City (loan)	2020–21	Championship	5	1	—		1	0	—		—		6	1
Sheffield United (loan)	2021–22	Championship	35	11	0	0	—		—		2 (Note: Appearances in Championship play-offs)	1	37	12
Nottingham Forest	2022–23	Premier League	35	5	0	0	3	0	—		—		38	5
Nottingham Forest	2023–24	Premier League	37	5	4	1	1	0	—		—		42	6
Nottingham Forest	2024–25	Premier League	34	7	4	0	0	0	—		—		38	7
Nottingham Forest	2025–26	Premier League	37	15	1	0	1	0	14	3	—		53	18
Nottingham Forest	2026–27	Premier League	8	1	0	0	0	0	–		–		8	1
Nottingham Forest	Total		151	33	9	1	5	0	14	3	—		179	37
Career total			259	46	18	1	10	1	21	4	6	1	314	53

=== International ===
As of match played 6 October 2026

Appearances and goals by national team and year
National team	Year	Apps	Goals
England	2024	2	0
England	2025	4	0
England	2026	4	0
Total		10	0

== Honours ==
Wolverhampton Wanderers

- EFL Championship: 2017–18

England U17

- FIFA U-17 World Cup: 2017

England U21

- UEFA European Under-21 Championship: 2023

Individual

- Premier League Player of the Month: April 2026
- Sheffield United Player of the Year: 2021–22
- Sheffield United Young Player of the Year: 2021–22
- Nottingham Forest Player of the Season: 2022–23
