= 2021–22 Sheffield United F.C. season =

Sheffield United
2021–22 season
- Owner: Abdullah bin Musa'ad bin Abdulaziz Al Saud
- Chairman: Yusuf Giansiracusa
- Manager: Slaviša Jokanović (until 25 November); Paul Heckingbottom (from 25 November)
- Stadium: Bramall Lane
- Championship: 5th
- Championship Playoffs: Semi-finals (eliminated by Nottingham Forest)
- FA Cup: Third round
- EFL Cup: Third round
- Top goalscorer: League: Billy Sharp (14); All: Billy Sharp (15)
- Highest home attendance: 30,813 (vs. Fulham, 29 April 2022)
- Lowest home attendance: 6,778 (vs. Carlisle United, 10 August 2021)
- Average home league attendance: 27,720
Home colours	Away colours

The 2021–22 season was Sheffield United's first season back in the Championship since the 2018–19 season following relegation last season and was the 133rd year in their history. This season, the club participated in the Championship, FA Cup and EFL Cup. The season covered the period from 1 July 2021 to 30 June 2022.

During pre-season, Slaviša Jokanović was appointed as manager on a three-year deal, however was sacked on 25 November 2021 after a poor start to the season. Paul Heckingbottom was appointed, and took the team from lower mid table into the playoffs by May. The season was ended in heartbreak, however, after Morgan Gibbs-White missed the deciding penalty in a shootout defeat to Nottingham Forest.

== Squad statistics ==
=== Appearances and goals ===
Updated 9 April 2022

No.	Pos	Nat	Player	Total		Championship		FA Cup		EFL Cup		Championship Play-offs	
No.	Pos	Nat	Player	Apps	Goals	Apps	Goals	Apps	Goals	Apps	Goals	Apps	Goals
Goalkeepers
1	GK	(Wales) WAL	Adam Davies	0	0	0	0	0	0	0	0	0	0
18	GK	(England) ENG	Wes Foderingham	36	0	32	0	1	0	1	0	2	0
31	GK	(England) ENG	Jake Eastwood	0	0	0	0	0	0	0	0	0	0
Defenders
2	DF	(Greece) GRE	George Baldock	27	1	24+1	1	0	0	0	0	1+1	0
3	DF	(Republic of Ireland) IRL	Enda Stevens	24	2	21+1	1	0	0	1	1	1	0
5	DF	(England) ENG	Jack O'Connell	0	0	0	0	0	0	0	0	0	0
6	DF	(England) ENG	Chris Basham	34	0	25+4	0	1	0	2	0	2	0
12	DF	(Republic of Ireland) IRL	John Egan	48	2	46	2	0	0	0	0	2	0
19	DF	(England) ENG	Jack Robinson	32	3	26+1	3	1	0	2	0	2	0
20	DF	(England) ENG	Jayden Bogle	22	3	16+2	3	1	0	3	0	0	0
22	DF	(England) ENG	Ben Davies	22	1	21+1	1	0	0	0	0	0	0
25	DF	(Croatia) CRO	Filip Uremović	3	0	3	0	0	0	0	0	0	0
26	DF	(England) ENG	Charlie Goode	2	0	1+1	0	0	0	0	0	0	0
33	DF	(Wales) WAL	Rhys Norrington-Davies	26	0	20+2	0	1	0	1	0	1+1	0
34	DF	(England) ENG	Kyron Gordon	8	0	4+1	0	1	0	2	0	0	0
35	DF	(Poland) POL	Kacper Łopata	2	0	0	0	0	0	2	0	0	0
Midfielders
4	MF	(Scotland) SCO	John Fleck	39	2	31+4	1	0	0	0+2	0	2	1
8	MF	(Norway) NOR	Sander Berge	34	6	22+9	5	1	0	0	0	2	1
16	MF	(Northern Ireland) NIR	Oliver Norwood	49	1	42+2	1	0+1	0	1+1	0	2	0
23	MF	(England) ENG	Ben Osborn	39	3	21+13	3	1	0	1+1	0	1+1	0
24	MF	(Republic of Ireland) IRL	Conor Hourihane	31	1	15+14	1	1	0	0	0	0+1	0
27	MF	(England) ENG	Morgan Gibbs-White	37	12	33+2	11	0	0	0	0	2	1
29	MF	(Senegal) SEN	Iliman Ndiaye	35	7	23+7	7	0+1	0	1+1	0	2	0
Forwards
7	FW	(England) ENG	Rhian Brewster	16	4	10+4	3	0	0	1+1	1	0	0
9	FW	(Scotland) SCO	Oli McBurnie	30	1	9+19	0	0	0	1+1	1	0	0
10	FW	(England) ENG	Billy Sharp	42	15	30+9	14	1	0	1+1	1	0	0
17	FW	(Republic of Ireland) IRL	David McGoldrick	21	2	10+9	2	1	0	1	0	0	0
32	MF	(Denmark) DEN	William Osula	5	0	0+5	0	0	0	0	0	0	0
36	FW	(England) ENG	Daniel Jebbison	11	0	1+7	0	0	0	1+1	0	0+1	0
Player(s) out on loan:
13	DF	(England) ENG	Max Lowe	0	0	0	0	0	0	0	0	0	0
21	GK	(Netherlands) NED	Michael Verrips	3	0	1	0	0	0	2	0	0	0
30	MF	(England) ENG	Zak Brunt	2	0	0	0	0	0	2	0	0	0
14	FW	(Scotland) SCO	Oliver Burke	6	0	2+1	0	0+1	0	2	0	0	0
11	FW	(France) FRA	Lys Mousset	7	3	5+2	3	0	0	0	0	0	0
15	MF	(England) ENG	Luke Freeman	8	1	1+3	0	0+1	0	3	1	0	0
40	DF	(England) ENG	Femi Seriki	1	0	1	0	0	0	0	0	0	0
Players who left the club:
1	GK	(England) ENG	Aaron Ramsdale	2	0	2	0	0	0	0	0	0	0
1	GK	(Sweden) SWE	Robin Olsen	11	0	11	0	0	0	0	0	0	0
32	FW	(England) ENG	Tyler Smith	1	0	0	0	0	0	1	0	0	0
28	MF	(England) ENG	Regan Slater	0	0	0	0	0	0	0	0	0	0
25	MF	(Algeria) ALG	Adlène Guedioura	2	0	0+1	0	0	0	1	0	0	0

==== Goals ====
As of 29 April 2022

Rank	No.	Nat.	Po.	Name	Championship	FA Cup	EFL Cup	Championship Play-offs	Total
1	10	(England)	CF	Billy Sharp	14	0	1	0	15
2	27	(England)	MF	Morgan Gibbs-White	11	0	0	1	12
3	29	(Senegal)	MF	Iliman Ndiaye	7	0	0	0	7
4	8	(Norway)	MF	Sander Berge	5	0	0	1	6
5	7	(England)	CF	Rhian Brewster	3	0	1	0	4
6	11	(France)	CF	Lys Mousset	3	0	0	0	3
6	23	(England)	MF	Ben Osborn	3	0	0	0	3
6	20	(England)	DF	Jayden Bogle	3	0	0	0	3
6	19	(England)	DF	Jack Robinson	3	0	0	0	3
7	12	(Republic of Ireland)	DF	John Egan	2	0	0	0	2
7	17	(Republic of Ireland)	CF	David McGoldrick	2	0	0	0	2
7	3	(Republic of Ireland)	DF	Enda Stevens	1	0	1	0	2
7	4	(Scotland)	MF	John Fleck	1	0	0	1	2
7	2	(Greece)	DF	George Baldock	1	0	0	0	1
7	16	(Northern Ireland)	MF	Oliver Norwood	1	0	0	0	1
7	24	(Republic of Ireland)	MF	Conor Hourihane	1	0	0	0	1
7	22	(England)	DF	Ben Davies	1	0	0	0	1
7	15	(England)	MF	Luke Freeman	0	0	1	0	1
7	9	(Scotland)	CF	Oli McBurnie	0	0	1	0	1
Own goals					1	0	0	0	1
Total					63	0	5	3	71

== Transfers ==
=== Transfers in ===
Date	Position	Nationality	Name	From	Fee	Ref.
15 July 2021	MF	(England)	Sydie Peck	(England) Arsenal	Free transfer	
8 September 2021	MF	(England)	Joe Starbuck	(England) Grimsby Town	Undisclosed	
13 September 2021	CM	(Algeria)	Adlène Guedioura	(Qatar) Al-Gharafa	Free transfer	
21 January 2022	DF	(England)	Connor Barratt	(England) Birmingham City	Undisclosed	
25 January 2022	GK	(Wales)	Adam Davies	(England) Stoke City	£250,000	

=== Loans in ===
Date from	Position	Nationality	Name	From	Date until	Ref.
16 August 2021	CB	(England)	Ben Davies	(England) Liverpool	End of season	
30 August 2021	CM	(Republic of Ireland)	Conor Hourihane	(England) Aston Villa	End of season	
31 August 2021	CM	(England)	Morgan Gibbs-White	(England) Wolverhampton Wanderers	End of season	
31 August 2021	GK	(Sweden)	Robin Olsen	(Italy) Roma	18 January 2022 (Note: On 18 January, Olsen was recalled by parent club Roma.)	
31 January 2022	CB	(England)	Charlie Goode	(England) Brentford	End of season	
24 March 2022	CB	(Croatia)	Filip Uremović	(Russia) Rubin Kazan	Free transfer	

=== Loans out ===
Date from	Position	Nationality	Name	To	Date until	Ref.
13 July 2021	LB	(England)	Harry Boyes	(England) Solihull Moors	3 January 2022	
3 August 2021	CM	(England)	George Broadbent	(England) Rochdale	1 January 2022	
12 August 2021	RB	(England)	Femi Seriki	(Belgium) Beerschot	End of season	
13 August 2021	GK	(Germany)	Jordan Amissah	(England) Guiseley	September 2021	
13 August 2021	MF	(England)	Harrison Neal	(England) Kettering Town	September 2021	
21 August 2021	GK	(England)	Marcus Dewhurst	(England) Solihull Moors	mid-September 2021	
27 August 2021	LB	(England)	Max Lowe	(England) Nottingham Forest	End of season	
31 August 2021	CF	(England)	Daniel Jebbison	(England) Burton Albion	31 January 2022	
7 September 2021	GK	(England)	Jake Eastwood	(England) Portsmouth	14 September 2021	
28 October 2021	CM	(England)	Zak Brunt	(England) Southend United	January 2022	
28 October 2021	CB	(Poland)	Kacper Łopata	(England) Southend United	End of season	
4 January 2022	CM	(England)	Zak Brunt	(England) Notts County	End of season	
4 January 2022	MF	(England)	Harrison Neal	(England) Southend United	End of season	
11 January 2022	GK	(Netherlands)	Michael Verrips	(Netherlands) Fortuna Sittard	End of season	
21 January 2022	FW	(Scotland)	Oliver Burke	(England) Millwall	End of season	
31 January 2022	CF	(France)	Lys Mousset	(Italy) Salernitana	End of season	
31 January 2022	MF	(England)	Luke Freeman	(England) Millwall	End of season	
22 March 2022	RB	(France)	Jean Belehouan	(England) Farsley Celtic	End of season	
22 March 2022	RB	(England)	Femi Seriki	(England) Boston United	End of season	
30 April 2022	GK	(England)	Jake Eastwood	(England) Rochdale	7 May 2022	

=== Transfers out ===
Date	Position	Nationality	Name	To	Fee	Ref.
30 June 2021	GK	(England)	Josh Chapman	(England) Rotherham United	Free transfer	
30 June 2021	CB	(England)	Ashton Hall	(England) Matlock Town	Released	
30 June 2021	CB	(England)	Phil Jagielka	(England) Derby County	Released	
30 June 2021	CM	(England)	John Lundstram	(Scotland) Rangers	Released	
30 June 2021	GK	(England)	Simon Moore	(England) Coventry City	Released	
30 June 2021	CM	(England)	Jack Rodwell	(Australia) Western Sydney Wanderers	Released	
30 June 2021	CB	(England)	Tommy Williams	Unattached	Released	
5 July 2021	CF	(Wales)	Ryan Viggars	(England) Charlton Athletic	Undisclosed	
24 July 2021	CB	(England)	Kean Bryan	(England) West Bromwich Albion	Released	
29 July 2021	CB	(England)	Sam Graham	(England) Rochdale	Free transfer	
20 August 2021	GK	(England)	Aaron Ramsdale	(England) Arsenal	Undisclosed	
27 August 2021	CF	(England)	Tyler Smith	(England) Hull City	Undisclosed	
27 January 2022	DM	(England)	Regan Slater	(England) Hull City	Undisclosed	

== Pre-season friendlies ==
The Blades confirmed they would play pre-season friendlies against Europa Point Doncaster Rovers and Norwich City as part of their preparations for the new campaign.

10 July 2021 Friendly	Sheffield United	3–0	Europa Point	TBA, Spain
19:00 CEST	Egan 34'; Mousset 42'; Smith 60'	Report		Stadium: TBA

28 July 2021 Friendly	Doncaster Rovers	0–4	Sheffield United	Doncaster
19:00 BST		Report	Burke 25'; Mousset 34', 45+4'; Freeman 82'	Stadium: Keepmoat Stadium

31 July 2021 Friendly	Sheffield United	Cancelled	Norwich City	Sheffield
15:00 BST				Stadium: Bramall Lane
Note: Match was cancelled due to a small number of positive COVID-19 test results with the Norwich City group.

== Competitions ==
=== Overview ===
Competition	Starting round	Record							
Competition	Starting round	Pld	W	D	L	GF	GA	GD	Win %
Championship	Matchday 1	46	21	12	13	63	45	+18	45.65
FA Cup	Third round	1	0	0	1	0	3	−3	0.00
EFL Cup	First Round	3	2	1	0	5	3	+2	66.67
Championship Play-Offs	Semi Final	2	1	0	1	3	3	+0	50.00
Total		52	24	13	15	71	54	+17	46.15

Last updated: 9 February 2022
Source: Soccerway

=== Championship ===
==== League table ====
Pos	Team	Pld	W	D	L	GF	GA	GD	Pts	Promotion, qualification or relegation
2	Bournemouth (P)	46	25	13	8	74	39	+35	88	Promotion to the Premier League
3	Huddersfield Town	46	23	13	10	64	47	+17	82	Qualification for Championship play-offs
4	Nottingham Forest (O, P)	46	23	11	12	73	40	+33	80	Qualification for Championship play-offs
5	Sheffield United	46	21	12	13	63	45	+18	75	Qualification for Championship play-offs
6	Luton Town	46	21	12	13	63	55	+8	75	Qualification for Championship play-offs
7	Middlesbrough	46	20	10	16	59	50	+9	70	
8	Blackburn Rovers	46	19	12	15	59	50	+9	69	

Source: EFL Official Website
Rules for classification: 1) Points; 2) Goal difference; 3) Number of goals scored; 4) Head-to-head results; 5) Wins; 6) Away goals; 7) Penalty points (sec 9.5); 8) 12-point sending off offences
(O) Play-off winners; (P) Promoted

==== Results summary ====
Overall								Home						Away					
Pld	W	D	L	GF	GA	GD	Pts	W	D	L	GF	GA	GD	W	D	L	GF	GA	GD
46	21	12	13	63	45	+18	75	14	5	5	41	16	+25	7	7	8	22	29	−7

Last updated: 29 April 2022.

==== Results by matchday ====
Matchday	1	2	3	4	5	6	7	8	9	10	11	12	13	14	15	16	17	18	19	20	21	22	23	24	25	26	27	28	29	30	31	32	33	34	35	36	37	38	39	40	41	42	43	44	45	46
Ground	H	A	A	H	A	H	H	A	H	A	A	H	H	A	H	A	A	H	A	H	A	A	A	A	H	A	A	H	A	H	H	H	A	H	H	A	A	H	A	H	H	H	A	H	A	H
Result	L	D	L	L	D	W	D	W	W	L	L	W	L	W	L	D	L	D	W	W	W	W	L	D	W	W	W	W	D	D	W	W	L	D	W	L	D	W	L	W	D	L	D	W	W	W
Position	22	20	22	23	23	18	19	15	11	13	14	13	15	14	17	16	18	17	16	13	10	11	14	12	11	11	10	10	8	8	6	6	7	7	5	6	9	5	8	6	6	6	6	6	5	5

Updated to match(es) played on 29 April 2022. Source: Statto.com
A = Away; H = Home; W = Win; D = Draw; L = Loss

==== Matches ====
Sheffield United's fixtures were announced on 24 June 2021.

7 August 2021 1	Sheffield United	0–1	Birmingham City	Sheffield
20:00 BST	Brewster (yellow card) 71'	Report	Colin 19', (yellow card) 79'; Pedersen (yellow card) 42'; Woods (yellow card) 66'; Leko (yellow card) 77'; Castillo (yellow card) 86'; Gardner (yellow card) 90'	Stadium: Bramall Lane; Attendance: 29,043; Referee: Tim Robinson
Note: Live on Sky Sports

14 August 2021 2	Swansea City	0–0	Sheffield United	Landore
20:00 BST	Grimes (yellow card) 51'	Report	Baldock (yellow card) 12'; McBurnie (yellow card) 89'	Stadium: Liberty Stadium; Attendance: 15,946; Referee: Keith Stroud
Note: Live on Sky Sports

18 August 2021 3	West Bromwich Albion	4–0	Sheffield United	West Bromwich
20:00 BST	Robinson 26' (o.g.); O'Shea 47'; Mowatt 53'; Robinson 59'	Report	McGoldrick (yellow card) 30'	Stadium: The Hawthorns; Referee: Matt Donohue
Note: Live on Sky Sports

21 August 2021 4	Sheffield United	1–2	Huddersfield Town	Sheffield
15:00 BST	Sharp 90+2'	Report	Turton (yellow card) 36'; Colwill (yellow card) 40', (goal) 90+4'; Koroma 75'; Nicholls (yellow card) 87'	Stadium: Bramall Lane; Attendance: 28,036; Referee: Michael Salisbury

28 August 2021 5	Luton Town	0–0	Sheffield United	Luton
15:00 BST	Naismith (yellow card) 6'	Report	Egan (yellow card) 47'	Stadium: Kenilworth Road; Attendance: 9,774; Referee: Andy Davies

11 September 2021 6	Sheffield United	6–2	Peterborough United	Sheffield
15:00 BST	Ndiaye 14', 70'; Fleck 51'; Osborn 53', 90+3'; Gibbs-White 68'	Report	Marriott 40'; Burrows (yellow card) 49'; Butler (yellow card) 59'; Clarke-Harris 79' (pen.)	Stadium: Bramall Lane; Attendance: 27,359; Referee: Steve Martin

14 September 2021 7	Sheffield United	2–2	Preston North End	Sheffield
19:45 BST	Gibbs-White 7'; Norwood (yellow card) 45+2'; Norrington-Davies (yellow card) 74'; Berge 84'	Report	Riis Jakobsen (yellow card) 13', (goal) 90+5'; Johnson 19'	Stadium: Bramall Lane; Attendance: 25,463; Referee: Geoff Eltringham

18 September 2021 8	Hull City	1–3	Sheffield United	Kingston upon Hull
12:30 BST	Greaves (yellow card) 43'; Honeyman (yellow card) 46'; Smallwood (yellow card) 57'; Lewis-Potter 74'	Report	Sharp 17'; Egan 50', 61'; Norrington-Davies (yellow card) 53'; Guedioura (yellow card) 66'	Stadium: MKM Stadium; Attendance: 14,451; Referee: Dean Whitestone

25 September 2021 9	Sheffield United	1–0	Derby County	Sheffield
15:00 BST	Gibbs-White (yellow card) 24'; Sharp 90'	Report	Shinnie (yellow card) 24'; Roos (red card) 57'	Stadium: Bramall Lane; Attendance: 27,905; Referee: David Webb

28 September 2021 10	Middlesbrough	2–0	Sheffield United	Middlesbrough
19:45 BST	Watmore 9'; Peltier (yellow card) 13'; McNair 37'; Crooks (yellow card) 65'; Šporar (yellow card) 70'; Bamba (yellow card) 73'	Report	Stevens (yellow card) 10'; Fleck (yellow card) 66'	Stadium: Riverside Stadium; Referee: James Linington

2 October 2021 11	Bournemouth	2–1	Sheffield United	Kings Park
15:00 BST	Pearson (yellow card) 47'; Smith (yellow card) 55'; Solanke 62' (pen.); Billing 65'; Zemura (yellow card) 80'	Report	Fleck (yellow card) 7'; Osborn (yellow card) 55'; Gibbs-White 56'	Stadium: Vitality Stadium; Attendance: 9,349; Referee: Robert Jones

16 October 2021 12	Sheffield United	2–1	Stoke City	Sheffield
15:00 BST	Mousset 80'; McGoldrick 83'	Report	Smith (yellow card) 27'; Brown 55', (yellow card) 56'	Stadium: Bramall Lane; Attendance: 28,576; Referee: Keith Stroud

19 October 2021 13	Sheffield United	1–2	Millwall	Sheffield
19:45 BST	Gibbs-White (yellow card) 34' (yellow-red card) 54'; Sharp 45' (pen.); Stevens (yellow card) 82'; Norwood (yellow card) 90+6'	Report	Wallace 11'; Saville (yellow card) 67'; Cooper 90+2'	Stadium: Bramall Lane; Attendance: 25,345; Referee: Matt Donohue

24 October 2021 14	Barnsley	2–3	Sheffield United	Barnsley
12:30 BST	Cole 78'; Leya Iseka 82'	Report	Mousset 51', 53', (yellow card) 52'; Stevens (yellow card) 56'; Osborn 72'	Stadium: Oakwell Stadium; Attendance: 15,720; Referee: Gavin Ward

30 October 2021 15	Sheffield United	0–1	Blackpool	Sheffield
15:00 BST	Davies (yellow card) 79'; Norwood (yellow card) 89'	Report	Bowler (yellow card) 62'; Anderson 76'	Stadium: Bramall Lane; Attendance: 28,304; Referee: Tony Harrington

2 November 2021 16	Nottingham Forest	1–1	Sheffield United	West Bridgford
19:45 GMT	Yates (yellow card) 51'; Figueiredo (yellow card) 53'; Johnson (yellow card) 69'; Grabban 83'; Worrall (yellow card) 90+1'	Report	Norwood (yellow card) 38'; Mousset (yellow card) 45+2'; Gibbs-White 78'	Stadium: The City Ground; Attendance: 25,238; Referee: Leigh Doughty

6 November 2021 17	Blackburn Rovers	3–1	Sheffield United	Blackburn
15:00 GMT	Khadra 37'; Brereton 59'; Poveda 70'; Lenihan (yellow card) 76'	Report	Brewster 2'; Bogle (yellow card) 5'; Fleck (yellow card) 24'; Norwood (yellow card) 80'	Stadium: Ewood Park; Attendance: 17,291; Referee: Oliver Langford

20 November 2021 18	Sheffield United	0–0	Coventry City	Sheffield
12:00 GMT	Egan (yellow card) 22'; Bogle (yellow card) 31'; Hourihane (yellow card) 38'	Report	Hamer (yellow card) 30'; O'Hare (yellow card) 51'	Stadium: Bramall Lane; Attendance: 28,075; Referee: Michael Salisbury

23 November 2021 19	Reading	0–1	Sheffield United	Reading
20:00 GMT		Report	Fleck (yellow card) 15'; Bogle 57'; Brewster (yellow card) 77'; Gibbs-White (yellow card) 90+2'	Stadium: Select Car Leasing Stadium; Attendance: 10,247; Referee: Andy Davies

28 November 2021 20	Sheffield United	2–0	Bristol City	Sheffield
12:30 GMT	Gibbs-White (yellow card) 31'; Brewster 40'; Sharp (yellow card) 78', (goal) 89'	Report	Bentley (yellow card) 20'; O'Dowda (yellow card) 28'; Martin (yellow card) 39'; Weimann (yellow card) 84'	Stadium: Bramall Lane; Attendance: 25,615; Referee: Geoff Eltringham

4 December 2021 21	Cardiff City	2–3	Sheffield United	Cardiff
15:00 GMT	Harris 32'; Collins (yellow card) 44'; Morrison (red card) 52'; McGuinness 90'	Report	Norwood (yellow card) 40'; Gibbs-White 61'; Sharp 73'; McGoldrick 75'	Stadium: Cardiff City Stadium; Attendance: 18,310; Referee: John Busby

20 December 2021 22	Fulham	0–1	Sheffield United	Fulham
19:45 GMT		Report	Ndiaye 3'; Foderingham (yellow card) 45'; Robinson (yellow card) 55'; Bogle (yellow card) 85'	Stadium: Craven Cottage; Attendance: 17,308; Referee: James Linington

15 January 2022 23	Derby County	2–0	Sheffield United	Derby
15:00 GMT	Lawrence 69', 78', (yellow card) 78'	Report	Ndiaye (yellow card) 90+3'	Stadium: Pride Park; Attendance: 24,597; Referee: Graham Scott

18 January 2022 24	Preston North End	2–2	Sheffield United	Preston
19:45 GMT	Hughes (red card) 38'; Browne 71'; Cunningham (yellow card) 82'; Riis 89'	Report	Bogle 17', (yellow card) 80'; Sharp 39' (pen.); Hourihane (yellow card) 60'	Stadium: Deepdale; Attendance: 12,954; Referee: David Webb

22 January 2022 25	Sheffield United	2–0	Luton Town	Sheffield
15:00 GMT	Brewster 48'; Robinson 51'	Report	Burke (red card) 61'	Stadium: Bramall Lane; Attendance: 27,780; Referee: Steve Martin

26 January 2022 26	Peterborough United	0–2	Sheffield United	Peterborough
17:30 GMT		Report	Sharp 54'; Hourihane (yellow card) 62'; Morton 81' (o.g.)	Stadium: London Road; Attendance: 10,152; Referee: Dean Whitestone

4 February 2022 27	Birmingham City	1–2	Sheffield United	Bordesley
19:45 GMT	Roberts (yellow card) 50'; Taylor (yellow card) 57', (goal) 61'; Bowyer (yellow card) 76'; Pedersen (yellow card) 80'; Bacuna (yellow card) 90+2'	Report	Sharp (yellow card) 50', (goal) 64'; Bogle 75'	Stadium: St Andrew's; Referee: Keith Stroud

9 February 2022 28	Sheffield United	2–0	West Bromwich Albion	Sheffield
19:45 GMT	Sharp 22', 80'; Bogle (yellow card) 76'	Report	Mowatt (yellow card) 38'; Livermore (red card) 39'	Stadium: Bramall Lane; Attendance: 26,541; Referee: Leigh Doughty

12 February 2022 29	Huddersfield Town	0–0	Sheffield United	Huddersfield
15:00 GMT	Hogg (yellow card) 90+3'	Report	Berge (yellow card) 17'; Robinson (yellow card) 69'; McBurnie (yellow card) 73'; Fleck (yellow card) 90'	Stadium: John Smith's Stadium; Attendance: 17,523; Referee: James Linington

15 February 2022 30	Sheffield United	0–0	Hull City	Sheffield
19:45 GMT	Ndiaye (yellow card) 67'; Baldock (yellow card) 83'	Report	Honeyman (yellow card) 45+3'; McLoughlin (yellow card) 75'	Stadium: Bramall Lane; Attendance: 27,601; Referee: Oliver Langford

19 February 2022 31	Sheffield United	4–0	Swansea City	Sheffield
15:00 GMT	Gibbs-White 14', 78'; Baldock 17', (yellow card) 41'; Sharp 38'; Norwood (yellow card) 39'	Report		Stadium: Bramall Lane; Attendance: 26,564; Referee: David Webb

23 February 2022 32	Sheffield United	1–0	Blackburn Rovers	Sheffield
19:45 GMT	Egan (yellow card) 29'; Gibbs-White (yellow card) 56'; Berge (yellow card) 58'; Goode (red card) 66'; Davies 90+2'	Report	Rothwell (yellow card) 26'; Travis (yellow card) 67'; Khadra (penalty missed) 72'	Stadium: Bramall Lane; Attendance: 26,495; Referee: Matt Donohue

26 February 2022 33	Millwall	1–0	Sheffield United	Bermondsey
15:00 GMT	Cooper 61'	Report	Ndiaye (yellow card) 43'; Baldock (yellow card) 51'; Norrington-Davies (yellow card) 70'; Norwood (yellow card) 90+4'	Stadium: The Den; Attendance: 14,638; Referee: Michael Salisbury

4 March 2022 34	Sheffield United	1–1	Nottingham Forest	Sheffield
19:45 GMT	Robinson (yellow card) 32'; Davies (yellow card) 51'; Sharp 69'; Norrington-Davies (yellow card) 87'; McBurnie (yellow card) 90+3'	Report	Johnson (penalty missed) 33'; Garner (yellow card) 43'; Yates 90+5'	Stadium: Bramall Lane; Attendance: 28,841; Referee: Josh Smith

8 March 2022 35	Sheffield United	4–1	Middlesbrough	Sheffield
19:45 GMT	Berge 23'; Sharp 25', (yellow card) 49'; Gibbs-White (yellow card) 49', (goal) 79'; Hourihane (yellow card) 57'; Robinson 59'	Report	Howson (yellow card) 41'; Peltier (yellow card) 49'; Balogun 62'; Crooks (yellow card) 84'	Stadium: Bramall Lane; Attendance: 28,994; Referee: Tim Robinson

12 March 2022 36	Coventry City	4–1	Sheffield United	Coventry
15:00 GMT	Gyökeres 20'; O'Hare 52', 59'; Godden 68'	Report	Berge 16'	Stadium: Coventry Building Society Arena; Attendance: 21,732; Referee: Jeremy Simpson

16 March 2022 37	Blackpool	0–0	Sheffield United	Blackpool
19:45 GMT (UTC)	Connolly (yellow card) 41'	Report	Robinson (yellow card) 31'; Sharp (yellow card) 90'	Stadium: Bloomfield Road; Attendance: 11,915; Referee: Geoff Eltringham

19 March 2022 38	Sheffield United	2–0	Barnsley	Sheffield
12:30 GMT	Berge 54'; Gordon (yellow card) 58'; Gibbs-White 76'	Report	Brittain (yellow card) 72'	Stadium: Bramall Lane; Attendance: 28,515; Referee: Matt Donohue

2 April 2022 39	Stoke City	1–0	Sheffield United	Stoke-on-Trent
15:00 BST	Egan 78' (o.g.)	Report		Stadium: Bet365 Stadium; Attendance: 22,631; Referee: David Webb

5 April 2022 40	Sheffield United	1–0	Queens Park Rangers	Sheffield
19:45 BST	Norwood 9'; Uremović (yellow card) 51'; Fleck (yellow card) 87'	Report	Dickie (yellow card) 12'; Hendrick (yellow card) 58'; Field (yellow card) 80'	Stadium: Bramall Lane; Attendance: 26,488; Referee: Darren Bond

9 April 2022 41	Sheffield United	0–0	Bournemouth	Sheffield
12:45 BST	Stevens (yellow card) 24'; Fleck (yellow card) 35'; Egan (yellow card) 71'	Report	Billing (yellow card) 74'; Kelly (yellow card) 90+3'	Stadium: Bramall Lane; Attendance: 26,769; Referee: Dean Whitestone

15 April 2022 42	Sheffield United	1–2	Reading	Sheffield
15:00 BST	Gibbs-White (yellow card) 6'; Baldock (yellow card) 57'; Jebbison (yellow card) 81'; Ndiaye (yellow card) 87', (goal) 90'	Report	João 17'; Laurent (yellow card) 18'; Yiadom (yellow card) 49'; McIntyre 90+2', (yellow card) 90+2'; Morrison (yellow card) 90+4'	Stadium: Bramall Lane; Attendance: 29,125; Referee: Gavin Ward

18 April 2022 43	Bristol City	1–1	Sheffield United	Ashton Gate
17:30 BST	Martin 49'; Weimann (yellow card) 83'; Klose (yellow card) 90+1'	Report	Basham (yellow card) 21'; Egan (yellow card) 41'; Gibbs-White 60'; Baldock (yellow card) 65'; Fleck (yellow card) 84'	Stadium: Ashton Gate Stadium; Referee: Keith Stroud

23 April 2022 44	Sheffield United	1–0	Cardiff City	Sheffield
15:00 BST	Ndiaye 47'; Norwood (yellow card) 67'	Report	Bagan (yellow card) 56'; McGuinness (yellow card) 60'; Ng (yellow card) 71'	Stadium: Bramall Lane; Attendance: 26,802; Referee: Oliver Langford

29 April 2022 45	Queens Park Rangers	1–3	Sheffield United	Shepherd's Bush
19:45 BST	Austin 31'; McCallum (yellow card) 88'; Johansen (yellow card) 90+6'	Report	Ndiaye 54'; Robinson 73', (yellow card) 90'; Fleck (yellow card) 87'; Hourihane 90+4'	Stadium: Kiyan Prince Foundation Stadium; Attendance: 15,824; Referee: Peter Bankes

7 May 2022 46	Sheffield United	4–0	Fulham	Sheffield
12:30 BST	Gibbs-White 10'; Ndiaye 21'; Berge 25'; Fleck (yellow card) 27'; Stevens 49', (yellow card) 85'	Report	Hector (yellow card) 68'	Stadium: Bramall Lane; Attendance: 30,813; Referee: Josh Smith

==== Play-offs ====
14 May 2022 Semi-final 1st Leg	Sheffield United	1–2	Nottingham Forest	Sheffield
15:00 BST	Fleck (yellow card) 29'; Robinson (yellow card) 44'; Norwood (yellow card) 53'; Berge 90+1'; Baldock (yellow card) 90+3'	Report	Colback 10'; Worrall (yellow card) 34'; Zinckernagel (yellow card) 43'; Spence (yellow card) 44'; Johnson 71'	Stadium: Bramall Lane; Attendance: 30,225; Referee: Andre Marriner

17 May 2022 Semi-final 2nd Leg	Nottingham Forest	1–2 (a.e.t.) (3–3 agg.) (3–2 p)	Sheffield United	West Bridgford
19:45 BST	Johnson 19'; McKenna (yellow card) 75'; Worrall (yellow card) 90+1'; Cook (yellow card) 111'	Report	Gibbs-White 47'; Robinson (yellow card) 58'; Fleck 75'	Stadium: City Ground; Attendance: 29,015; Referee: Michael Oliver
	Penalties
	Johnson (penalty scored); Cafú (penalty scored); Cook (penalty scored); Lolley (penalty missed)		(penalty missed) Norwood; (penalty missed) Hourihane; (penalty scored) Berge; (penalty scored) Ndiaye; (penalty missed) Gibbs-White

=== FA Cup ===
Sheff Utd were drawn away to Wolverhampton Wanderers in the third round.

9 January 2022 Third round	Wolverhampton Wanderers	3–0	Sheffield United	Wolverhampton
14:00 GMT	Podence 14', 80'; Semedo 73'	Report	Basham (yellow card) 61'; Freeman (yellow card) 84'	Stadium: Molineux Stadium; Referee: Paul Tierney

=== EFL Cup ===
Blades were drawn at home to Carlisle United in the first round Derby County in the second round and Southampton in the third round.

10 August 2021 First round	Sheffield United	1–0	Carlisle United	Sheffield
19:45 BST	Brewster 24'; Jebbison (yellow card) 89'; Norrington-Davies (yellow card) 90+2'	Report	Armer (yellow card) 77'	Stadium: Bramall Lane; Attendance: 6,778; Referee: James Oldham

24 August 2021 Second round	Sheffield United	2–1	Derby County	Sheffield
19:45 BST	Osborn (yellow card) 43'; Freeman 53', (yellow card) 83'; Fleck (yellow card) 74'; Sharp 76'; Robinson (yellow card) 90+3'	Report	Sibley 44'	Stadium: Bramall Lane; Attendance: 7,973; Referee: Anthony Backhouse

21 September 2021 Third round	Sheffield United	2–2 (2–4 p)	Southampton	Sheffield
19:45 BST	Stevens 8'; McBurnie (yellow card) 32', (goal) 66'	Report	Diallo 23'; Lyanco (yellow card) 33'; Salisu 53'	Stadium: Bramall Lane; Referee: John Brooks
	Penalties
	Norwood (penalty scored); Brewster (penalty missed); Osborn (penalty scored); McBurnie (penalty missed)		Ward-Prowse (penalty scored); Adams (penalty scored); Broja (penalty missed); Diallo (penalty scored); Romeu (penalty scored)
