= Rhian Brewster =

English footballer (born 2000)

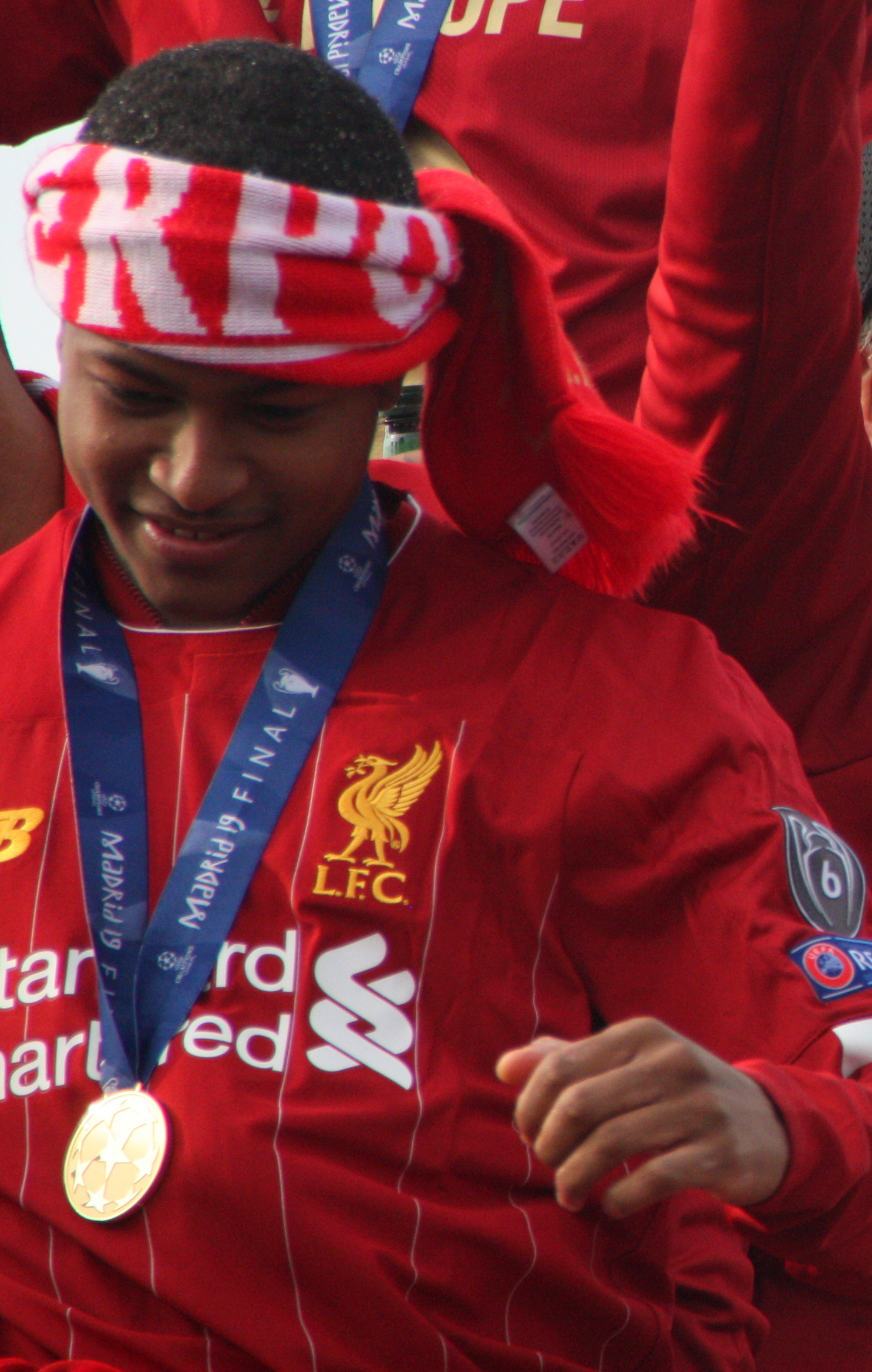
- Brewster during Liverpool's 2019 Champions League victory parade

Personal information
- Full name: Rhian Joel Brewster
- Date of birth: 1 April 2000 (age 26)
- Place of birth: Chadwell Heath, Greater London, England
- Height: 1.80 m (5 ft 11 in)
- Position: Striker

Team information
- Current team: Derby County
- Number: 10

Youth career
- 2008–2015: Chelsea
- 2015–2017: Liverpool

Senior career*
Years	Team	Apps	(Gls)
2017–2020	Liverpool	0	(0)
2020	→ Swansea City (loan)	20	(10)
2020–2025	Sheffield United	106	(8)
2025–	Derby County	41	(8)

International career^{‡}
2016–2017	England U16	4	(4)
2016–2017	England U17	23	(20)
2017	England U18	1	(0)
2019–2022	England U21	18	(3)
Medal record
Men's football
Representing England
FIFA U-17 World Cup
Winner	2017
UEFA European Under-17 Championship
Runner-up	2017
- * Club domestic league appearances and goals as of 22:14, 6 November 2026 (UTC) ‡ National team caps and goals as of 21:08, 27 September 2022 (UTC)

Rhian Joel Brewster (born 1 April 2000) is an English professional footballer who plays as a striker for EFL Championship club Derby County. In 2017, he was part of the England squad which won the 2017 FIFA U-17 World Cup in India and was awarded the Golden Boot award for ending as the competition's leading goalscorer.

== Club career ==
=== Early career ===
Brewster was born in Chadwell Heath, Greater London, to a Barbadian father and Turkish Cypriot mother. Brewster attended school at Chadwell Primary School before joining the Chadwell Heath and Shield Academy YFC. At the age of seven, he was scouted by representatives from Chelsea, Arsenal, West Ham United and Charlton Athletic. He ultimately joined Chelsea where he developed his game under coach Michael Beale in the club's academy until the age of 14, whereafter he left to join Premier League rivals Liverpool.

=== Liverpool ===
In 2015, Liverpool signed Brewster from Chelsea following a recommendation by Beale who had taken up a position with the club. Brewster's decision to make the move was motivated in part by his father's influence who believed that he had a better chance of breaking through to the first team through Liverpool's academy than Chelsea's. He initially joined the club's U18 team before being promoted to the U23 squad, where he scored on his debut against Ipswich Town. During his time with the club's academy, Brewster was placed on a special training regime which included one-on-one sessions with former Liverpool and Real Madrid winger, Steve McManaman.

Brewster was then called up by manager Jürgen Klopp to the first-team for club friendlies in October and November 2016 during which he scored a hat-trick against Accrington Stanley. Later that season, he was named on the bench for Liverpool's Premier League game against Crystal Palace on 23 April 2017, but remained an unused substitute. The following season, during Liverpool's UEFA Youth League match against Spartak Moscow, Brewster was the victim of alleged racist comments from Spartak's captain, Leonid Mironov. An investigation into the incident was opened by UEFA after the match and Brewster later said in an interview with The Guardian that it had been the seventh such instance he had experienced, including once before against the same opposition. UEFA later ruled that there was insufficient evidence to take further action against Mironov.

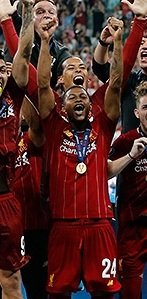
Brewster after winning the 2019 UEFA Super Cup with Liverpool

On 12 January 2018, during an U23 match against Manchester City, Brewster received oxygen and had to be stretchered off the field after landing awkwardly following an aerial challenge. He was later diagnosed with a high ankle sprain and related ligament damage and was ruled out for the remainder of the season. In March, he had to undergo a second operation in order to repair damage to his knee which he sustained during the same incident. Towards the end of the season, Brewster was the subject of intense transfer speculation which culminated in Liverpool cancelling a scheduled friendly against Borussia Mönchengladbach after the German club were alleged to have 'tapped him up'.

In June 2018, Brewster signed a five-year professional contract with Liverpool. He was named in the match squad for the second leg of Liverpool's 2018–19 Champions League semi-final against Barcelona on 7 May 2019, but remained an unused substitute. Despite never having played in a competitive game for the club, Brewster was on the bench again in the 2019 UEFA Champions League Final against Tottenham Hotspur on 1 June 2019 so collected a winner's medal as Liverpool won 2–0.

He made his competitive debut for the club on 25 September 2019 in an EFL Cup match against Milton Keynes Dons.

==== Loan to Swansea City ====
On 7 January 2020, Brewster joined Championship club Swansea City on loan for the remainder of the season, where he reunited with former England U17 manager Steve Cooper. He made his debut for the club in the South Wales derby against Cardiff City on 12 January, which ended in a goalless draw, before scoring his first professional goal in a 2–1 win over Wigan Athletic at the Liberty Stadium six days later.

In March 2020, the Championship season was temporarily suspended due to the outbreak of the COVID-19 pandemic. Following the season's restart in June, Brewster scored two goals in a 3–0 win over Middlesbrough, increasing his tally to six goals in 12 games. Brewster finished the season with 11 goals in 22 appearances.

==== Return to Liverpool ====
Brewster returned to Liverpool following his loan spell at Swansea to begin preseason training prior to the beginning of the 2020–21 Premier League campaign. He appeared as a substitute in the 2020 FA Community Shield. The game ended 1–1 and went to penalties, with Brewster hitting the crossbar on his attempt, leading to Arsenal winning the shootout and lifting the trophy.

=== Sheffield United ===
On 2 October 2020, Sheffield United announced the signing of Brewster from Liverpool on a five-year deal, for a reported fee of around £23.5 million. The deal included a buy-back option at £40 million, valid until 30 June 2023.

He scored his first goal for the club in an EFL Cup tie against Carlisle United on 10 August 2021. On 6 November, Brewster scored his first league goal for Sheffield United in a 3–1 loss away against Blackburn Rovers. On 29 January 2022, he sustained a hamstring injury during a 2–0 away win against Peterborough United, which forced him to miss the rest of the 2021–22 season. Later that year, on 29 October, he suffered another hamstring injury during a 2–0 away win over West Bromwich Albion. In September 2023, he recovered from injury which sidelined him for eleven months. In early March 2024, he sustained another hamstring injury during training, which kept him off the field for two months.

On 11 December 2024, Brewster scored his first goal in over two years as United beat Millwall 1–0 at the Den.

Brewster also scored the only goal in the Steel City Derby on 16 March, 2025 against Sheffield Wednesday at Hillsborough. Two weeks later he scored against Coventry City to reach his highest ever league goal tally for the Blades, with 4, scoring his first goal at Bramall Lane since 2022.

=== Derby County ===
On 1 August 2025, Derby County announced that Brewster had been signed on a two-year contract until the summer of 2027 as a free agent after leaving Sheffield United. On 22 August 2025, Brewster made his debut for Derby a 1–1 league draw against Bristol City as a 60th-minute substitute for Andreas Weimann. He has started to play in a deeper role of a number 10 attacking midfielder at Derby County. On 30 August 2025, Brewster scored his first Derby County a 2–2 league draw at Ipswich Town in the 70th minute. Brewster scored in three consecutive games for Derby County in late January to early February 2026. Brewster's first season at Derby County ended prematurely on 21 March 2026 after he sustained a knee injury which required surgery, Brewster scored seven times in 31 appearances during the 2025–26 season.

== International career ==
An England youth international, Brewster has represented the nation at various youth levels, but remains eligible to play for Turkey through his Turkish Cypriot mother and Barbados through his Barbadian father.

Having previously represented England at U16 level, Brewster scored six goals in five appearances for England U17 in 2016, including a hat-trick against Croatia and a brace against Germany. He then led the nation's attack at 2017 UEFA European Under-17 Championship and featured in the final against Spain. England ultimately lost on penalties with Brewster one of the players who missed his spot-kick. He ended the tournament with a return of three goals in six appearances.

Later that year, Brewster gained widespread press attention after scoring successive hat-tricks against the United States and Brazil in the quarter-final and semi-finals of the 2017 FIFA U-17 World Cup. He then scored England's opening goal in the final as the team overcame Spain 5–2 to claim the trophy. Brewster's return of eight goals for the tournament saw him win the Golden Boot award for the top scorer and he was also awarded the Bronze Ball for his individual performances. In December 2017, Brewster revealed in an interview with The Guardian that his teammate Morgan Gibbs-White was racially abused by a Spanish player during the match with the FA reporting the incident to FIFA.

On 30 August 2019, Brewster was included in the England U21 squad for the first time and made his debut as a 79th-minute substitute during the 3–2 2021 U21 Euro qualifying win against Turkey on 6 September 2019.

On 7 September 2021, Brewster scored his first U21 goal from the penalty spot during the 2–0 2023 UEFA European Under-21 Championship qualification win over Kosovo U21s at Stadium MK.

== Personal life ==
In June 2022, Brewster and Sheffield United teammate Oli McBurnie were charged with common assault by Nottinghamshire Police "in relation to disorder at the conclusion of a game at the City Ground on 17 May 2022". Both players "strenuously denied" the allegations. The charges against Brewster were dropped in July 2022.

In October 2022, Brewster was subjected to racial abuse on Instagram for a second time, having received similar messages in March 2021.

Brewster is a Muslim. He has credited his Islamic faith for helping him become disciplined.

== Career statistics ==
As of match played 6 November 2026

Appearances and goals by club, season and competition
Club	Season	League			FA Cup		League Cup		Europe		Other		Total	
Club	Season	Division	Apps	Goals	Apps	Goals	Apps	Goals	Apps	Goals	Apps	Goals	Apps	Goals
Liverpool	2018–19	Premier League	0	0	0	0	0	0	0	0	—		0	0
Liverpool	2019–20	Premier League	0	0	1	0	2	0	0	0	0	0	3	0
Liverpool	2020–21	Premier League	0	0	0	0	0	0	0	0	1 (Note: Appearance in FA Community Shield)	0	1	0
Liverpool	Total		0	0	1	0	2	0	0	0	1	0	4	0
Swansea City (loan)	2019–20	Championship	20	10	—		—		—		2 (Note: Appearances in EFL Championship play-offs)	1	22	11
Sheffield United	2020–21	Premier League	27	0	3	0	0	0	—		—		30	0
Sheffield United	2021–22	Championship	14	3	0	0	2	1	—		0	0	16	4
Sheffield United	2022–23	Championship	16	1	0	0	1	0	—		—		17	1
Sheffield United	2023–24	Premier League	13	0	1	0	0	0	—		—		14	0
Sheffield United	2024–25	Championship	36	4	1	0	2	0	—		3	0	42	4
Sheffield United	Total		106	8	5	0	5	1	0	0	3	0	119	9
Derby County	2025–26	Championship	29	7	1	0	1	0	—		—		31	7
Derby County	2026–27	Championship	12	1	0	0	0	0	—		—		12	1
Derby County	Total		41	8	1	0	1	0	0	0	0	0	43	8
Career total			167	26	7	0	8	1	0	0	6	1	188	28

== Honours ==
Liverpool

- UEFA Champions League: 2018–19
- UEFA Super Cup: 2019

England U17

- FIFA U-17 World Cup: 2017
- UEFA European Under-17 Championship runner-up: 2017

Individual

- FIFA U-17 World Cup Golden Boot: 2017
- FIFA U-17 World Cup Bronze Ball: 2017
