= Tyler Smith (footballer) =

English footballer (born 1998)

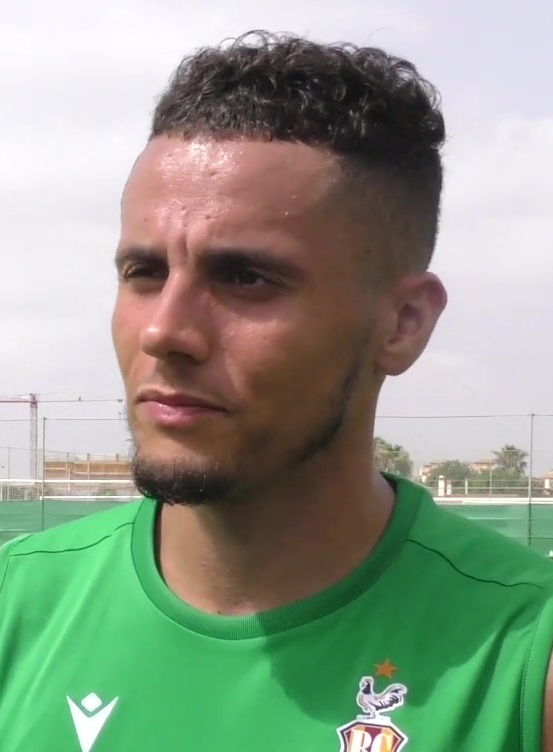
- Smith with Bradford City in 2023

Personal information
- Full name: Tyler Gavin Junior Smith
- Date of birth: 4 December 1998 (age 27)
- Place of birth: Sheffield, England
- Height: 5 ft 10 in (1.78 m)
- Position: Striker

Team information
- Current team: Derry City
- Number: 29

Senior career*
| Years | Team | Apps | (Gls) |
| 2018–2021 | Sheffield United | 0 | (0) |
| 2018 | → Barrow (loan) | 23 | (10) |
| 2019 | → Doncaster Rovers (loan) | 14 | (2) |
| 2019 | → Bristol Rovers (loan) | 20 | (3) |
| 2020 | → Rochdale (loan) | 4 | (1) |
| 2020–2021 | → Swindon Town (loan) | 23 | (7) |
| 2021–2023 | Hull City | 37 | (4) |
| 2023 | → Oxford United (loan) | 7 | (0) |
| 2023–2025 | Bradford City | 43 | (5) |
| 2025 | → Barrow (loan) | 21 | (5) |
| 2025–2026 | Rochdale | 22 | (5) |
| 2026– | Derry City | 9 | (1) |
- * Club domestic league appearances and goals as of 16:13, 9 November 2026 (UTC)

Tyler Gavin Junior Smith (born 4 December 1998) is an English professional footballer who plays as a striker for League of Ireland Premier Division club Derry City.

== Career ==
=== Sheffield United ===
Born in Sheffield, Smith began his career with Sheffield United. He was a ballboy with the club. He spent the first half of the 2018–19 season on loan at Barrow, before moving on loan to Doncaster Rovers in January 2019. He scored two goals on his debut on 19 January 2019, and was praised by manager Grant McCann as being "a star in the making". In July 2019 he moved on loan to Bristol Rovers for the 2019–20 season. In January 2020 was joined Rochdale on loan.

On 6 August 2020 he moved on loan to Swindon Town for the 2020–21 season. On 8 September 2020 he scored his first goal for Swindon in an EFL Trophy tie against West Bromwich Albion U21s.

=== Hull City ===
He signed for Hull City in August 2021, and made his debut for the club on 28 August in a 0–0 home draw against AFC Bournemouth. He scored his first goal for the club within the 1st minute of an FA Cup match against Everton on 8 January 2022.

In January 2023 Smith joined Oxford United on loan until the end of the season.

Smith was released by Hull City at the end of the 2022–23 season.

=== Bradford City ===
After his release, Smith signed a three-year deal with Bradford City. After the first few matches of the 2023–24 season, he said he was looking forward to playing more football. He scored his first goal for Bradford on 29 August 2023, in the EFL Cup. He later said the squad was deep enough to cope without injured fellow striker Andy Cook, with Smith himself being injured a few days later. On 31 October he scored a hat-trick in the EFL Trophy, to send the club through to the next round. He later praised teammate Kevin McDonald, who had served as caretaker manager.

After scoring the winning goal in a game against Accrington Stanley, Smith was compared to former Bradford City player Nahki Wells. By December 2023, Smith had scored 6 goals in 4 games in the EFL Trophy for the club. He later spoke positively about his striking partnership with Andy Cook.

After losing his first-team place, on 5 March 2024, Smith scored his first goal for the club since December 2023. On 23 April, in a 10 minute appearance, he scored the winning goal in the penultimate game of the season, to keep the club in contention for the play-offs.

He lost his first-team place again during the 2024–25 season; as of January 2025, he had not been in a matchday squad for two months.

On 17 January 2025, Smith returned to Barrow on loan until the end of the season. Ahead of the 2025–26 season, Smith was told by Bradford City manager Graham Alexander that he could leave the club, with former club Barrow said to be interested in signing him, although Smith turned down the chance to return to Barrow. He left the club by mutual consent on 1 September 2025.

=== Rochdale ===
On 3 October 2025, Smith returned to Rochdale, now of the National League, on a deal until the end of the 2025–26 season; the move saw him reunite with brother Kyron Gordon, having previously played together at Sheffield United.

=== Derry City ===
On 1 August 2026, he signed for League of Ireland Premier Division club Derry City.

== Personal life ==
His younger brother is fellow footballer Kyron Gordon. Smith became a father in September 2024, after his wife gave birth.

== Career statistics ==
As of match played 30 October 2026

Appearances and goals by club, season and competition
| Club | Season | League | | | National Cup (Note: Includes FA Cup & FAI Cup) | | League Cup (Note: Includes EFL Cup) | | Other | | Total | |
| Club | Season | Division | Apps | Goals | Apps | Goals | Apps | Goals | Apps | Goals | Apps | Goals |
|---|---|---|---|---|---|---|---|---|---|---|---|---|
| Sheffield United | 2018–19 | Championship | 0 | 0 | 0 | 0 | 0 | 0 | 0 | 0 | 0 | 0 |
| Sheffield United | 2019–20 | Premier League | 0 | 0 | 0 | 0 | 0 | 0 | 0 | 0 | 0 | 0 |
| Sheffield United | 2020–21 | Premier League | 0 | 0 | 0 | 0 | 0 | 0 | 0 | 0 | 0 | 0 |
| Sheffield United | 2021–22 | Championship | 0 | 0 | 0 | 0 | 1 | 0 | 0 | 0 | 1 | 0 |
| Sheffield United | Total | | 0 | 0 | 0 | 0 | 1 | 0 | 0 | 0 | 1 | 0 |
| Barrow (loan) | 2018–19 | National League | 23 | 10 | 1 | 1 | 0 | 0 | 0 | 0 | 24 | 11 |
| Doncaster Rovers (loan) | 2018–19 | League One | 14 | 2 | 0 | 0 | 0 | 0 | 0 | 0 | 14 | 2 |
| Bristol Rovers (loan) | 2019–20 | League One | 20 | 3 | 3 | 0 | 2 | 2 | 3 | 0 | 28 | 5 |
| Rochdale (loan) | 2019–20 | League One | 4 | 1 | 0 | 0 | 0 | 0 | 0 | 0 | 4 | 1 |
| Swindon Town (loan) | 2020–21 | League One | 23 | 7 | 0 | 0 | 1 | 0 | 2 | 3 | 26 | 10 |
| Hull City | 2021–22 | Championship | 23 | 1 | 1 | 1 | 0 | 0 | 0 | 0 | 24 | 2 |
| Hull City | 2022–23 | Championship | 14 | 3 | 1 | 0 | 0 | 0 | 0 | 0 | 15 | 3 |
| Hull City | Total | | 37 | 4 | 2 | 1 | 0 | 0 | 0 | 0 | 39 | 5 |
| Oxford United (loan) | 2022–23 | League One | 7 | 0 | 0 | 0 | 0 | 0 | 0 | 0 | 7 | 0 |
| Bradford City | 2023–24 | League Two | 38 | 5 | 1 | 0 | 3 | 1 | 5 | 6 | 47 | 12 |
| Bradford City | 2024–25 | League Two | 5 | 0 | 0 | 0 | 0 | 0 | 2 | 0 | 7 | 0 |
| Bradford City | Total | | 43 | 5 | 1 | 0 | 3 | 1 | 7 | 6 | 54 | 12 |
| Barrow (loan) | 2024–25 | League Two | 20 | 5 | 0 | 0 | 0 | 0 | 0 | 0 | 20 | 5 |
| Rochdale | 2025–26 | National League | 22 | 5 | 0 | 0 | 1 | 0 | 1 | 1 | 24 | 6 |
| Derry City | 2026 | League of Ireland Premier Division | 9 | 1 | 3 | 1 | 0 | 0 | 0 | 0 | 12 | 2 |
| Career total | | | 222 | 43 | 10 | 3 | 7 | 3 | 13 | 10 | 252 | 59 |

== Honours ==
Rochdale

- National League play-offs: 2026

Derry City

- FAI Cup: 2026
