= Kyron Gordon =

English footballer (born 2002)

Personal information
- Full name: Kyron Silveria Gordon
- Date of birth: 24 May 2002 (age 24)
- Place of birth: Sheffield, England
- Height: 6 ft 0 in (1.84 m)
- Position: Defender

Team information
- Current team: Stockport County
- Number: 24

Youth career
- –2021: Sheffield United

Senior career*
Years	Team	Apps	(Gls)
2021–2023	Sheffield United	6	(0)
2021–2022	→ Boston United (loan)	3	(0)
2022–2023	→ Boreham Wood (loan)	4	(0)
2023–2024	AFC Fylde	7	(0)
2024–2026	Rochdale	102	(8)
2026–	Stockport County	9	(0)
- * Club domestic league appearances and goals as of 20:22, 23 October 2026 (UTC)

Kyron Silveria Gordon (born 24 May 2002) is an English professional footballer who plays as a defender for EFL League One club Stockport County.

== Early and personal life ==
Gordon is the younger brother of fellow footballer Tyler Smith, the two making their debut for Sheffield United alongside each other.

== Career ==
=== Sheffield United ===
On 10 August 2021, Gordon made his senior debut for Sheffield United in an EFL Cup victory over Carlisle United. In November 2021, Gordon joined National League North club Boston United on loan, being recalled in January in order to feature in the FA Cup against Wolverhampton Wanderers, talking of the importance of the loan spell in aiding his development. His league debut came on 26 February in a 1–0 defeat to Millwall. At the end of the 2021–22 season, Gordon signed a new contract with the club.

On 11 November 2022, Gordon joined National League club Boreham Wood on loan. Gordon departed Sheffield United at the end of the 2022–23 season.

=== AFC Fylde ===
Gordon joined AFC Fylde on a short-term deal in September 2023. He left Fylde at the end of his contract.

=== Rochdale ===
Gordon joined Rochdale on a deal lasting until the end of the 2023–24 season in January 2024. A one-year contract extension clause was activated at the end of the season.

On 6 August 2024, Gordon signed a new deal until the summer of 2026.

=== Stockport County ===
In June 2026 he signed a three-year contract with League One club Stockport County.

== Career statistics ==
As of match played on 10 October 2026

Appearances and goals by club, season and competition
Club	Season	League			National Cup		League Cup		Other		Total	
Club	Season	Division	Apps	Goals	Apps	Goals	Apps	Goals	Apps	Goals	Apps	Goals
Sheffield United	2021–22	Championship	5	0	1	0	2	0	0	0	8	0
Sheffield United	2022–23	Championship	1	0	0	0	1	0	0	0	2	0
Sheffield United	Total		6	0	1	0	3	0	0	0	10	0
Boston United (loan)	2021–22	National League North	3	0	0	0	—		2 (Note: Appearance(s) in FA Trophy)	0	5	0
Boreham Wood (loan)	2022–23	National League	4	0	0	0	—		0	0	4	0
AFC Fylde	2023–24	National League	7	0	0	0	—		0	0	7	0
Rochdale	2023–24	National League	19	0	0	0	—		0	0	19	0
Rochdale	2024–25	National League	38	2	2	0	—		6 (Note: Five appearances in FA Trophy, one appearance in 2024–25 National League Play-offs)	0	46	2
Rochdale	2025–26	National League	45	6	1	0	—		2 (Note: Appearances in 2025–26 National League Play-offs)	0	48	6
Rochdale	Total		102	8	3	0	0	0	8	0	113	8
Stockport County	2026–27	League One	9	0	0	0	1	0	0	0	10	0
Career total			131	8	4	0	4	0	10	0	149	8

== Honours ==
Rochdale

- National League play-offs: 2026

Individual

- Rochdale Supporters' Player of the Season: 2024–25, 2025–26
- National League Team of the Season: 2025–26
