= Josh Hmami =

English footballer

Personal information
- Full name: Joshua Majid Hmami
- Date of birth: 22 March 2000 (age 26)
- Place of birth: Oldham, England
- Height: 5 ft 10 in (1.78 m)
- Position: Midfielder

Team information
- Current team: Harrogate Town
- Number: 17

Youth career
- 2010–2015: Bolton Wanderers
- 2015–2016: Barnsley
- 2016–2018: Accrington Stanley

Senior career*
Years	Team	Apps	(Gls)
2017–2018	Accrington Stanley	1	(0)
2018–2020	The New Saints	3	(0)
2019	→ FC United of Manchester (loan)	3	(0)
2019–2020	→ Ramsbottom United (loan)	21	(11)
2020–2021	Marine	7	(5)
2021–2024	Southport	104	(10)
2024–2025	King's Lynn Town	38	(4)
2025–2026	FC Halifax Town	42	(12)
2026–	Harrogate Town	2	(2)
- * Club domestic league appearances and goals as of 18:57, 5 August 2026 (UTC)

Joshua Majid Hmami (born 22 March 2000) is an English professional footballer who plays as a midfielder for National League club Harrogate Town.

== Club career ==
=== Accrington Stanley ===
On 30 December 2017, Hmami made his professional debut for Accrington Stanley in their EFL League Two match against Grimsby Town, replacing Billy Kee in the 3–0 victory.

=== The New Saints ===
In May 2018 he joined The New Saints in the Welsh Premier League.

==== FC United of Manchester (loan) ====
In December 2018 he joined FC United of Manchester on loan.

==== Ramsbottom United (loan) ====
in August 2019 he joined Ramsbottom United on loan until January 2020.

=== Marine ===
in June 2020 he joined Marine.

=== Southport ===
On 10 July 2021, Hmami joined Southport in the National League North on a two-year contract.

=== King's Lynn Town ===
On 17 June 2024, Hmami moved to National League North side King's Lynn Town, gaining an assist in his league debut against Warrington Town on 10 August 2024.

He had his contract terminated by mutual consent on 30 June 2025.

=== FC Halifax Town ===
On 18 July 2025, Hmami joined National League club FC Halifax Town, reuniting with former King's Lynn Town manager Adam Lakeland. He was named National League Player of the Month for December 2025 following a goal in each of his club's three matches across the month, in addition to a hat-trick in the FA Trophy.

=== Harrogate Town ===
On 4 August 2026, Hmami signed for Harrogate Town for an undisclosed fee ahead of the club's first season back in the National League following their relegation.

== Career statistics ==
As of match played 10 July 2021.

Club	Season	League			National Cup		League Cup		Other		Total	
Club	Season	Division	Apps	Goals	Apps	Goals	Apps	Goals	Apps	Goals	Apps	Goals
Accrington Stanley	2017–18	League Two	1	0	0	0	0	0	0	0	1	0
The New Saints	2018–19	Welsh Premier League	3	0	0	0	3	3	0	0	6	3
The New Saints	2019–20	Welsh Premier League	0	0	0	0	0	0	0	0	0	0
F.C. United of Manchester (loan)	2018–19	National League North	3	0	0	0	—		0	0	3	0
Ramsbottom United (loan)	2019–20	Northern Premier League	22	11	1	0	—		2 (Note: One appearance in the FA Trophy; one appearance in the Northern Premier League Challenge Cup)	0	25	11
Marine	2020–21	Northern Premier League	5	4	4	0	—		3 (Note: Appearances in the FA Trophy)	0	15	7
Southport	2021–22	National League North	32	4	1	0	—		2	0	35	4
Southport	2022–23	National League North	34	2	0	0	—		1	0	35	2
Southport	2023-24	National League North	38	4	0	0	—		1	0	39	4
King's Lynn Town	2024-25	National League North	21	2	1	0	—		1	1	23	3
Career total			159	27	10	0	3	3	10	1	182	34

== Honours ==
Individual

- National League Player of the Month: December 2025
