= Anthony Gomez Mancini =

French footballer (born 2001)

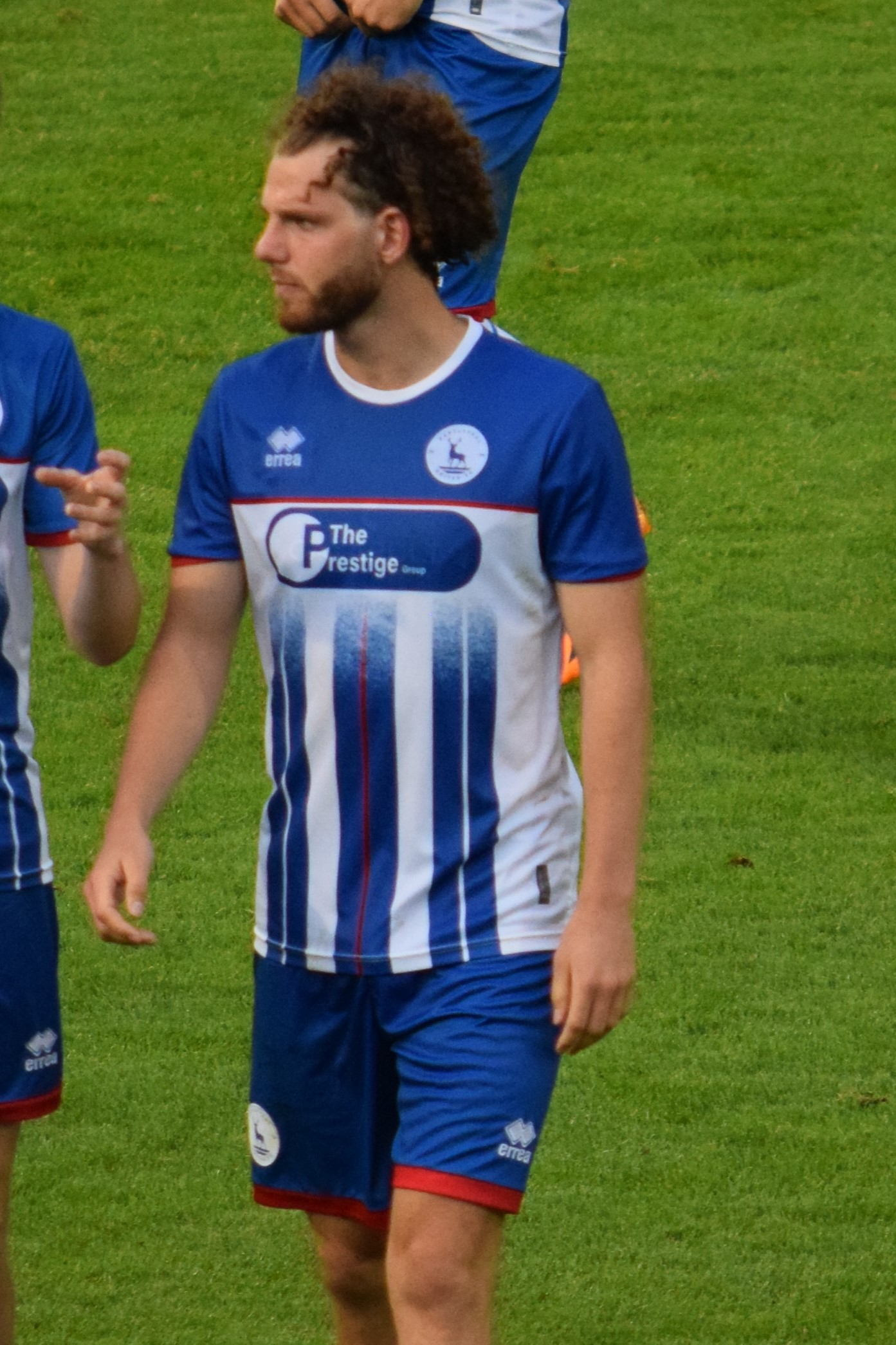
- Mancini playing for Hartlepool United in 2023

Personal information
- Full name: Anthony Jesus Gomez Mancini
- Date of birth: 6 April 2001 (age 25)
- Place of birth: Saint-Priest, France
- Height: 1.80 m (5 ft 11 in)
- Position: Midfielder

Youth career
- 2007–2008: Saint-Priest
- 2008–2012: Lyon
- 2012–2017: Saint-Priest
- 2017–2018: Tours

Senior career*
Years	Team	Apps	(Gls)
2018–2020	Angers II	34	(0)
2020–2022	Burnley	0	(0)
2023	Accrington Stanley	2	(0)
2023–2025	Hartlepool United	39	(5)
2025–2026	Rochdale	3	(0)

International career
2019	France U18	4	(0)
2019	France U19	1	(0)
- * Club domestic league appearances and goals as of 06:17, 12 July 2026 (UTC)

Anthony Jesus Gomez Mancini (born 6 April 2001) is a French professional footballer who plays as a midfielder.

== Club career ==
Born in Saint-Priest, Gomez Mancini spent his early career in his native France with Saint Priest, Lyon, Tours and Angers II. He then played for English club Burnley, before signing for Accrington Stanley in February 2023. On 20 May 2023, it was announced that Gomez Mancini would leave the club when his contract ended on 30 June.

On 24 July 2023, Mancini signed for National League side Hartlepool United after impressing during a pre-season trial. He scored his first league goal for Hartlepool in a 3–1 home victory against Maidenhead United. After an impressive start to the season which had seen Mancini voted as the supporters' Player of the Month for August, it was announced on 1 September that he would be ruled out for a minimum of six months due to a hamstring injury. However, Mancini returned early from injury, making a substitute appearance in a home defeat to Oldham Athletic on 26 December. He sustained a groin injury at the end of January 2024. He returned from that injury as a substitute in a match against Southend United but was taken off 12 minutes later. At the end of the season, Hartlepool took the option to extend his contract. At the end of the 2024–25 season, it was announced that he would be released by Hartlepool at the end of his contract.

On 2 July 2025, Gomez Mancini joined National League side Rochdale on an initial one-year deal. In October 2025, Rochdale manager Jimmy McNulty told the media that Mancini would be out for at least six weeks due to a muscle injury. On 18 May 2026, the club announced that Mancini had been released following the expiration of his contract.

== International career ==
He has represented France at under-18 and under-19 levels.

== Personal life ==
Gomez Mancini is of Spanish descent.

== Career statistics ==
As of match played 13 January 2026

Appearances and goals by club, season and competition
Club	Season	League			National cup		League cup		Other		Total	
Club	Season	Division	Apps	Goals	Apps	Goals	Apps	Goals	Apps	Goals	Apps	Goals
Angers II	2018–19	Championnat National 3	16	0	0	0	0	0	0	0	16	0
Angers II	2019–20	Championnat National 2	12	0	0	0	0	0	0	0	12	0
Angers II	2020–21	Championnat National 2	6	0	0	0	0	0	0	0	6	0
Angers II	Total		34	0	0	0	0	0	0	0	34	0
Burnley	2020–21	Premier League	0	0	0	0	0	0	0	0	0	0
Burnley	2021–22	Premier League	0	0	0	0	0	0	0	0	0	0
Burnley	Total		0	0	0	0	0	0	0	0	0	0
Accrington Stanley	2022–23	League One	2	0	0	0	0	0	1 (Note: Appearance(s) in EFL Trophy)	0	3	0
Hartlepool United	2023–24	National League	14	3	0	0	0	0	1	0	15	3
Hartlepool United	2024–25	National League	25	2	2	0	0	0	1	0	28	2
Hartlepool United	Total		39	5	2	0	0	0	2	0	43	5
Rochdale	2025–26	National League	3	0	0	0	0	0	4	1	7	1
Career total			78	5	2	0	0	0	7	1	87	6
