= 2023–24 Rochdale A.F.C. season =

English football club season

Rochdale A.F.C.
2023–24 season
- Chairman: Simon Gauge
- Manager: Jimmy McNulty
- Stadium: Crown Oil Arena
- National League: 11th
- FA Cup: Fourth qualifying round
- FA Trophy: Third round
- Top goalscorer: League: Kairo Mitchell (14); All: Kairo Mitchell (14)

The 2023–24 season was Rochdale A.F.C.'s 117th in existence and their first outside the Football League since the 1920–21 season. The club competed in the National League, the FA Cup and the FA Trophy.

== Squad statistics ==
=== Appearances and goals ===
No.	Pos	Nat	Player	Total		National League		F.A. Cup		FA Trophy	
No.	Pos	Nat	Player	Apps	Goals	Apps	Goals	Apps	Goals	Apps	Goals
1	GK	(England) ENG	Louie Moulden	29	0	28+0	0	1+0	0	0+0	0
1	GK	(Republic of Ireland) IRL	Tiernan Brooks	12	0	12+0	0	0+0	0	0+0	0
2	MF	(England) ENG	Kyron Gordon	20	0	20+0	0	0+0	0	0+0	0
3	DF	(England) ENG	Cameron John	32	0	32+0	0	0+0	0	0+0	0
4	MF	(England) ENG	Ryan East	45	4	42+1	4	1+0	0	1+0	0
5	DF	(England) ENG	Max Taylor	14	0	5+8	0	0+0	0	1+0	0
6	DF	(England) ENG	Ethan Ebanks-Landell	45	3	44+0	3	1+0	0	0+0	0
7	MF	(England) ENG	Tyrese Sinclair	33	11	22+9	10	1+0	0	1+0	1
8	MF	(England) ENG	Adam Clayton	29	0	23+4	0	1+0	0	1+0	0
9	FW	(Grenada) GRN	Kairo Mitchell	38	14	37+1	14	0+0	0	0+0	0
10	FW	(England) ENG	Devante Rodney	21	7	13+7	7	0+1	0	0+0	0
11	MF	(Nigeria) NGR	Jesurun Uchegbulam	32	1	19+11	1	0+1	0	1+0	0
12	GK	(England) ENG	Bradley Kelly	1	0	0+0	0	0+0	0	1+0	0
13	MF	(Republic of Ireland) IRL	Jimmy Keohane	43	7	34+7	7	1+0	0	1+0	0
14	MF	(England) ENG	Tommy McDermott	4	0	0+4	0	0+0	0	0+0	0
14	FW	(England) ENG	D'Mani Mellor	9	1	6+3	1	0+0	0	0+0	0
15	DF	(Wales) WAL	George Nevett	35	0	32+2	0	0+0	0	1+0	0
16	DF	(England) ENG	Kwaku Oduroh	22	1	11+9	1	1+0	0	1+0	0
17	MF	(England) ENG	Michael Afuye	10	0	2+6	0	0+1	0	0+1	0
18	MF	(Republic of Ireland) IRL	Cian Hayes	25	7	22+2	7	1+0	0	0+0	0
19	MF	(England) ENG	Dan Sassi	10	0	6+4	0	0+0	0	0+0	0
20	MF	(England) ENG	Harvey Gilmour	46	1	44+0	1	1+0	0	1+0	0
21	DF	(England) ENG	Max Conway	6	0	1+5	0	0+0	0	0+0	0
21	GK	(Australia) AUS	Jacob Chapman	6	0	6+0	0	0+0	0	0+0	0
23	DF	(England) ENG	Finlay Armstrong	13	0	9+4	0	0+0	0	0+0	0
24	DF	(Scotland) SCO	Kyle Ferguson	11	0	7+3	0	1+0	0	0+0	0
25	MF	(England) ENG	Sam Mather	10	2	6+4	2	0+0	0	0+0	0
34	MF	(England) ENG	Luke Mann	1	0	0+0	0	0+0	0	0+1	0
40	FW	(England) ENG	Ian Henderson	41	11	21+18	11	1+0	0	1+0	0
43	MF	(England) ENG	Corey Edwards	2	0	0+2	0	0+0	0	0+0	0
49	MF	(England) ENG	Isaac Burgess	2	0	0+1	0	0+0	0	0+1	0

=== Goals record ===
Rank	No.	Nat.	Po.	Name	National League	FA Cup	FA Trophy	Total
1	9	(Grenada)	FW	Kairo Mitchell	14	0	0	14
2	40	(England)	FW	Ian Henderson	11	0	0	11
2	7	(England)	MF	Tyrese Sinclair	10	0	1	11
4	10	(England)	FW	Devante Rodney	7	0	0	7
4	18	(Republic of Ireland)	MF	Cian Hayes	7	0	0	7
4	13	(Republic of Ireland)	MF	Jimmy Keohane	7	0	0	7
7	4	(England)	MF	Ryan East	4	0	0	4
8	6	(England)	DF	Ethan Ebanks-Landell	3	0	0	3
9	25	(England)	MF	Sam Mather	2	0	0	2
10	14	(England)	FW	D'Mani Mellor	1	0	0	1
10	16	(England)	DF	Kwaku Oduroh	1	0	0	1
10	11	(Nigeria)	MF	Jesurun Uchegbulam	1	0	0	1
10	20	(England)	MF	Harvey Gilmour	1	0	0	1
Total					69	0	1	70

=== Disciplinary record ===
Rank	No.	Nat.	Po.	Name	National League			FA Cup			FA Trophy			Total		
Rank	No.	Nat.	Po.	Name	Yellow card	(yellow card) (yellow-red card)	Red card	Yellow card	(yellow card) (yellow-red card)	Red card	Yellow card	(yellow card) (yellow-red card)	Red card	Yellow card	(yellow card) (yellow-red card)	Red card
1	20	(England)	MF	Harvey Gilmour	12	0	0	0	0	0	0	0	0	12	0	0
2	3	(England)	DF	Cameron John	8	0	0	0	0	0	0	0	0	8	0	0
2	9	(Grenada)	FW	Kairo Mitchell	7	0	1	0	0	0	0	0	0	7	0	1
4	6	(England)	DF	Ethan Ebanks-Landell	6	0	0	0	0	0	0	0	0	6	0	0
5	2	(England)	MF	Kyron Gordon	5	0	0	0	0	0	0	0	0	5	0	0
5	13	(Republic of Ireland)	MF	Jimmy Keohane	5	0	0	0	0	0	0	0	0	5	0	0
5	16	(England)	DF	Kwaku Oduroh	5	0	0	0	0	0	0	0	0	5	0	0
8	1	(England)	GK	Louie Moulden	4	0	0	0	0	0	0	0	0	4	0	0
8	10	(England)	FW	Devante Rodney	4	0	0	0	0	0	0	0	0	4	0	0
10	40	(England)	FW	Ian Henderson	2	0	1	0	0	0	0	0	0	2	0	1
11	1	(Republic of Ireland)	GK	Tiernan Brooks	2	0	0	0	0	0	0	0	0	2	0	0
11	8	(England)	MF	Adam Clayton	1	0	1	0	0	0	0	0	0	1	0	1
11	4	(England)	MF	Ryan East	2	0	0	0	0	0	0	0	0	2	0	0
11	24	(Scotland)	DF	Kyle Ferguson	2	0	0	0	0	0	0	0	0	2	0	0
11	18	(Republic of Ireland)	MF	Cian Hayes	2	0	0	0	0	0	0	0	0	2	0	0
11	15	(Wales)	DF	George Nevett	2	0	0	0	0	0	0	0	0	2	0	0
11	7	(England)	MF	Tyrese Sinclair	2	0	0	0	0	0	0	0	0	2	0	0
11	5	(England)	DF	Max Taylor	2	0	0	0	0	0	0	0	0	2	0	0
11	11	(Nigeria)	MF	Jesurun Uchegbulam	2	0	0	0	0	0	0	0	0	2	0	0
20	23	(England)	DF	Finlay Armstrong	1	0	0	0	0	0	0	0	0	1	0	0
20	21	(Australia)	GK	Jacob Chapman	1	0	0	0	0	0	0	0	0	1	0	0
20	19	(England)	MF	Dan Sassi	1	0	0	0	0	0	0	0	0	1	0	0
Total					78	0	3	0	0	0	0	0	0	78	0	3

== Transfers ==
=== In ===
Date	Pos	Player	Transferred from	Fee	Ref
9 June 2023	MF	(England) Harvey Gilmour	(England) FC Halifax Town	Free Transfer	
16 June 2023	FW	(Grenada) Kairo Mitchell	(England) Notts County	Free Transfer	
23 June 2023	DF	(Scotland) Kyle Ferguson	(England) Harrogate Town	Free Transfer	
28 June 2023	FW	(Sweden) Moe Shubbar	(England) Crawley Town	Undisclosed	
10 July 2023	MF	(England) Adam Clayton	(England) Bradford City	Free Transfer	
21 July 2023	MF	(England) Michael Afuye	(England) Avro	Free Transfer	
11 August 2023	MF	(Nigeria) Jesurun Uchegbulam	(England) Chesterfield	Undisclosed	
23 December 2023	MF	(England) Ryan East	(England) Bradford City	Undisclosed	
4 January 2024	DF	(England) Kyron Gordon	(England) AFC Fylde	Free Transfer	

=== Out ===
Date	Pos	Player	Transferred to	Fee	Ref
2 June 2023	MF	(England) Ethan Brierley	(England) Brentford	Undisclosed	
8 June 2023	DF	(England) Toby Mullarkey	(England) Grimsby Town	Undisclosed	
22 June 2023	MF	(Republic of Ireland) Liam Kelly	(England) Crawley Town	Free Transfer	
27 June 2023	GK	(England) Richard O'Donnell	(England) Blackpool	Undisclosed	
5 July 2023	MF	(England) Abraham Odoh	(England) Harrogate Town	Undisclosed	
20 July 2023	MF	(England) James Ball	(England) AFC Wimbledon	Free Transfer	
25 September 2023	FW	(Sweden) Moe Shubbar	(England) Weymouth	Free Transfer	
4 February 2024	FW	(England) Tahvon Campbell	(England) Solihull Moors	Undisclosed	
25 April 2024	MF	(England) Adam Clayton	(England) Liversedge	Released	
25 April 2024	DF	(England) Max Taylor	(England) Morcambe	Free Transfer	
25 April 2024	MF	(England) Michael Afuye	(England) Curzon Ashton	Free Transfer	
25 April 2024	MF	(England) Tyrese Sinclair	(England) York City	Free Transfer	

=== Loaned in ===
Date	Pos	Player	Loaned from	Date until	Ref
16 June 2023	MF	(England) Cody Johnson	(England) Stockport County	7 August 2023	
5 July 2023	DF	(England) Kwaku Oduroh	(England) Derby County	10 January 2024	
13 July 2023	GK	(England) Louie Moulden	(England) Wolverhampton Wanderers	16 January 2024	
10 August 2023	MF	(England) Tommy McDermott	(England) Port Vale	7 November 2023	
14 August 2023	MF	(England) Ryan East	(England) Bradford City	End of season	
24 August 2023	DF	(England) Max Conway	(England) Bolton Wanderers	6 October 2023	
5 October 2023	MF	(Republic of Ireland) Cian Hayes	(England) Fleetwood Town	End of season	
23 December 2023	DF	(England) Finlay Armstrong	(England) Fleetwood Town	End of season	
11 January 2024	FW	(England) D'Mani Mellor	(England) Wycombe Wanderers	End of season	
18 January 2024	GK	(Republic of Ireland) Tiernan Brooks	(England) Notts County	End of season	
1 February 2024	MF	(England) Sam Mather	(England) Manchester United	End of season	
1 February 2024	DF	(England) Sam Murray	(England) Manchester United	End of season	
23 February 2024	DF	(England) Dan Sassi	(England) Blackpool	End of season	
21 March 2024	GK	(Australia) Jacob Chapman	(England) Huddersfield Town	End of season	

=== Loaned out ===
Date	Pos	Player	Loaned to	Date until	Ref
8 July 2023	FW	(England) Tahvon Campbell	(England) Wealdstone	End of season	
12 January 2024	MF	(England) Michael Afuye	(England) Guiseley	End of season	
26 March 2024	DF	(England) Max Taylor	(England) Solihull Moors	End of season	

== Pre-season and friendlies ==
Win Draw Loss Fixtures

11 July 2023	Radcliffe	0–2	Rochdale	Radcliffe
19:45		Report	Henderson; Sinclair	Stadium: Neuven Stadium

15 July 2023	Chorley	1–0	Rochdale	Chorley
15:00	Johnson 11'	Report		Stadium: Victory Park

18 July 2023	Tranmere Rovers	0–2	Rochdale	Birkenhead
13:00	Turnbull (red card)	Report	Sinclair (pen.); Rodney	Stadium: Prenton Park

21 July 2023	Walsall	1–1	Rochdale	Walsall
19:30	Hutchinson	Report	Rodney	Stadium: Bescot Stadium

29 July 2023	Rochdale	1–0	Bradford City	Rochdale
	Rodney	Report		Stadium: Spotland Stadium

== Competitions ==
=== Overall record ===
Competition	Starting round	Record							
Competition	Starting round	Pld	W	D	L	GF	GA	GD	Win %
National League	Matchday 1	46	17	13	16	69	64	+5	36.96
FA Cup	Fourth qualifying round	1	0	0	1	0	1	−1	0.00
FA Trophy	Third round	1	0	0	1	1	5	−4	0.00
Total		48	17	13	18	70	70	+0	35.42

Last updated: pre-season
Source: Soccerway

=== National League ===
==== League table ====
Pos	Team	Pld	W	D	L	GF	GA	GD	Pts
9	Southend United	46	21	12	13	70	45	+25	65 (Note: Southend United were deducted ten points for failing to pay debt to HMRC.)
10	Oldham Athletic	46	15	18	13	63	60	+3	63
11	Rochdale	46	16	14	16	69	64	+5	62
12	Hartlepool United	46	17	9	20	70	82	−12	60
13	Eastleigh	46	16	11	19	73	87	−14	59

Source: National League official site
Rules for classification: 1) Points; 2) Goal difference; 3) Number of goals scored; 4) Number of matches won; 5) Head-to-head results

==== Results summary ====
Overall								Home						Away					
Pld	W	D	L	GF	GA	GD	Pts	W	D	L	GF	GA	GD	W	D	L	GF	GA	GD
46	16	14	16	69	64	+5	62	9	8	6	37	26	+11	7	6	10	32	38	−6

Last updated: pre-season.
Source: Soccerway

==== Results by round ====
Round	1	2	3	4	5	6	7	8	9	10	11	12	13	14	15	16	17	18	19	20	21	22	23	24	25	26	27	28	29	30	31	32	33	34	35	36	37	38	39	40	41	42	43	44	45	46
Ground	H	A	A	H	H	A	H	A	H	A	A	H	H	A	A	H	H	A	A	H	H	A	A	H	A	H	A	H	A	H	A	H	A	H	A	A	H	H	A	H	A	H	A	H	H	A
Result	L	W	L	W	D	W	L	D	W	D	W	L	D	L	D	L	D	W	L	W	W	W	L	D	D	W	L	W	L	L	L	L	D	W	L	L	D	W	W	W	L	D	D	D	D	W
Position	21	14	18	11	8	5	8	10	7	8	7	8	7	9	10	12	13	9	9	9	9	8	8	9	10	8	10	7	9	9	10	12	13	11	13	14	12	11	10	10	11	11	11	11	11	11

Updated to match(es) played on pre-season. Source: Soccerway
A = Away; H = Home; W = Win; D = Draw; L = Loss

==== Matches ====
Rochdale's fixtures were announced on 5 July 2023.
Win Draw Loss Fixtures

5 August 2023 1	Rochdale	0–1	Ebbsfleet United	Rochdale
17:30 BST	Clayton (yellow card) 27'; John (yellow card) 80'	Report	Cissé (yellow card) 30'; O'Neill 36' (yellow card) 49'; Clifford (yellow card) 67'; Wright (yellow card) 90'; Domi (yellow card) 90'	Stadium: Spotland Stadium; Attendance: 2,691; Referee: Gareth Rhodes

12 August 2023 2	Oxford City	0–1	Rochdale	Oxford
15:00 BST	Coyle (yellow card) 38'; William-Bushell (yellow card) 57'	Report	Henderson 71'; Mitchell (yellow card) 89'	Stadium: Marsh Lane; Attendance: 784; Referee: Steven Copeland

15 August 2023 3	Woking	3–2	Rochdale	Woking
19:45 BST	Kellermann (yellow card) 13'; Robinson (yellow card) 36'; Boateng (yellow card) 45+1'; Cuthbert 54'; Moss (yellow card) 58'; Grego-Cox 74' (pen.), 82'; Lewis (yellow card) 90'	Report	Sinclair 15'; East (yellow card) 21'; Mitchell (yellow card) 45+3' (goal) 84'; Oduroh (yellow card) 69'; Ferguson (yellow card) 82'	Stadium: Kingfield Stadium; Attendance: 2,314; Referee: Stephen Parkinson

19 August 2023 4	Rochdale	2–0	Eastleigh	Rochdale
15:00 BST	Henderson 9'; Ebanks-Landell (yellow card) 30'; Mitchell 45+3'; John (yellow card) 59'	Report	Nwabuokei (yellow card) 19'; Clampin (yellow card) 35'; Carter (yellow card) 45'; Taylor (yellow card) 53'; Boldewijn (yellow card) 81'	Stadium: Spotland Stadium; Attendance: 2,476; Referee: Jason Richardson

25 August 2023 5	Rochdale	2–2	Bromley	Rochdale
19:45 BST	Sinclair 39' (pen.), 50'; Clayton (red card) 68'	Report	Okoli 15'; Passley (red card) 38'; Cheek 62'; Smith (yellow card) 77'	Stadium: Spotland Stadium; Attendance: 2,474; Referee: Aaron Jackson

28 August 2023 6	York City	1–3	Rochdale	York
15:00 BST	Batty (yellow card) 12'; Howe (yellow card) 35'; Cordner (yellow card) 35'; Crookes 45+9' (red card) 51'; Fallowfield (yellow card) 52'; Dyson (yellow card) 81'	Report	Sinclair 36' (pen.), 53' (pen.); John (yellow card) 45+5'; Oduroh (yellow card) 45+6'; Henderson 87'; Moulden (yellow card) 90+6'	Stadium: York Community Stadium; Attendance: 5,466; Referee: Richard Aspinall

2 September 2023 7	Rochdale	0–1	FC Halifax Town	Rochdale
15:00 BST	John (yellow card) 23'; Gilmour (yellow card) 82'; Sinclair (yellow card) 90+5'	Report	Harker 22'; Alli (yellow card) 61'	Stadium: Spotland Stadium; Attendance: 3,491; Referee: Gary Parsons

9 September 2023 8	Kidderminster Harriers	1–1	Rochdale	Kidderminster
15:00 BST	Leesley 18' (yellow card) 61'; Maguire (yellow card) 50'; Knight-Percival (yellow card) 56'; Brown (yellow card) 79'	Report	Ebanks-Landell (yellow card) 35' (goal) 75'	Stadium: Aggborough Stadium; Attendance: 2,507; Referee: Paul Johnson

16 September 2023 9	Rochdale	4–2	Barnet	Rochdale
15:00 BST	Sinclair 23', 42'; Ebanks-Landell (yellow card) 29'; Gilmour 50'; Moulden (yellow card) 85'; Henderson 89'	Report	Kabamba 25', 67'; Hartigan (yellow card) 44'	Stadium: Spotland Stadium; Attendance: 2,568; Referee: James Durkin

19 September 2023 10	Boreham Wood	1–1	Rochdale	Borehamwood
19:45 BST	Marsh 48'; Bush (yellow card) 79'	Report	Mitchell 47'	Stadium: Meadow Park; Attendance: 911; Referee: Richie Watkins

23 September 2023 11	Dorking Wanderers	1–2	Rochdale	Dorking
15:00 BST	Blair (yellow card) 32' (goal) 58'; Taylor (yellow card) 55'; Pybus (yellow card) 69' (yellow-red card) 90+2'; Gallagher (yellow card) 89'	Report	Gilmour (yellow card) 72'; Ebanks-Landell 89'; Henderson 90+5'	Stadium: Meadowbank; Attendance: 1,628; Referee: Aaron Farmer

26 September 2023 12	Rochdale	1–2	Chesterfield	Rochdale
20:00 BST	Mitchell 13'; Uchegbulam (yellow card) 68'; Oduroh (yellow card) 78'; Henderson (yellow card) 89'	Report	Dobra 6'; Naylor 25'; Colclough (yellow card) 28'; Freckleton (yellow card) 87'; Jones (yellow card) 87'	Stadium: Spotland Stadium; Attendance: 3,044; Referee: Michael Barlow

30 September 2023 13	Rochdale	2–2	Southend United	Rochdale
15:00 BST	Keohane 10'; Mitchell 24'	Report	Miley (yellow card) 4'; Cardwell 26', 64' (yellow card) 70'; Bridge (yellow card) 45+5'; Demetriou (yellow card) 56'	Stadium: Spotland Stadium; Attendance: 2,653; Referee: Greg Rollason

3 October 2023 14	Solihull Moors	2–0	Rochdale	Solihull
19:45 BST	Stevens 49'; Kelly 72'	Report	Taylor (yellow card) 17'; Mitchell (yellow card) 25'; Uchegbulam (yellow card) 86'	Stadium: Damson Park; Attendance: 1,284; Referee: Jamie O'Connor

7 October 2023 15	Maidenhead United	2–2	Rochdale	Maidenhead
15:00 BST	Smith 60'; De Havilland (yellow card) 66'; Asare (yellow card) 70'; Zimba 84'; Pettit (yellow card) 90+7'	Report	Mitchell 29'; Sinclair 87'; Rodney (yellow card) 90+2'; Keohane (yellow card) 90+5'; Oduroh (yellow card) 90+8'	Stadium: York Road; Attendance: 1,350; Referee: Ruebyn Ricardo

21 October 2023 16	Rochdale	3–4	Oldham Athletic	Rochdale
15:00 BST	Mitchell 53'; Keohane 60', 81'	Report	Sheron 16'; Lundstram (yellow card) 47'; Green 49'; Hope 63'; Norwood 71'; McGahey (yellow card) 88'	Stadium: Spotland Stadium; Attendance: 6,722; Referee: James Westgate

24 October 2023 17	Rochdale	2–2	Gateshead	Rochdale
19:45 BST	Uchegbulam 16'; Henderson 26'; Keohane (yellow card) 64'; Oduroh (yellow card) 75'	Report	Francis 53' (yellow card) 63'; Richardson 67'; Dinanga (yellow card) 68'; Lofthouse (yellow card) 72'; Olley (red card) 78'	Stadium: Spotland Stadium; Attendance: 1,929; Referee: Steven Copeland

28 October 2023 18	Hartlepool United	2–3	Rochdale	Hartlepool
15:00 BST	Featherstone 45+6'; Wreh (yellow card) 77'; Dieseruvwe 83'	Report	Hayes 3'; Keohane 33'; East 45+6'	Stadium: Victoria Park; Attendance: 3,509; Referee: Dale Baines

11 November 2023 19	Wealdstone	3–2	Rochdale	London
15:00 GMT	Kretzschmar (yellow card) 25'; Cook 45+3', 90+5'; Charles (yellow card) 52'; Adarkwa 56'; Mason (yellow card) 67'; Barker (yellow card) 90+3'	Report	Mitchell 10'; East 52'; Gilmour (yellow card) 86'	Stadium: Grosvenor Vale; Attendance: 1,470; Referee: Jamie O'Connor

18 November 2023 20	Rochdale	2–1	Aldershot Town	Rochdale
15:00 GMT	Keohane 42'; Clayton (yellow card) 65'; Mitchell 79'	Report	Barham 37'	Stadium: Spotland Stadium; Attendance: 2,865; Referee: Aaron Bannister

21 November 2023 21	Rochdale	3–0	Altrincham	Rochdale
19:45 GMT	East 15', 63'; Gilmour (yellow card) 26'; John (yellow card) 46'; Mitchell 71'	Report	Marriott (yellow card) 39'; Cooper (yellow card) 87'	Stadium: Spotland Stadium; Attendance: 2,404; Referee: Gareth Rhodes

25 November 2023 22	Dagenham & Redbridge	1–2	Rochdale	Dagenham
15:00 GMT	Tavares (yellow card) 75'; Vincent 81'; Eastman (yellow card) 90+2'	Report	Hayes 30'; Henderson 53'	Stadium: Victoria Road; Attendance: 1,452; Referee: Aaron Jackson

2 December 2023 23	Bromley	1–0	Rochdale	Bromley
15:00 GMT	Olomola 80'	Report	Henderson (yellow card) 28'; John (yellow card) 60'	Stadium: Hayes Lane; Attendance: 2,524; Referee: Richie Watkins

16 December 2023 24	Rochdale	0–0	York City	Rochdale
15:00 GMT	Keohane (yellow card) 17'; Gilmour (yellow card) 41'	Report	Woodyard (yellow card) 41'	Stadium: Spotland Stadium; Attendance: 2,804; Referee: David Mcnamara

23 December 2023 25	FC Halifax Town	2–2	Rochdale	Halifax
15:00 GMT	Cosgrave 31'; Stott 35' (pen.); Alli (yellow card) 25'; Golden (yellow card) 80'	Report	Henderson 18'; John (yellow card) 25'; Moulden (yellow card) 34'; Keohane 67'	Stadium: The Shay; Attendance: 3,547; Referee: Aji Ajibola

26 December 2023 26	Rochdale	2–0	AFC Fylde	Rochdale
15:00 GMT	Henderson 45'; Sinclair (yellow card) 86'; John (yellow card) 90+4'; Oduroh 90+5'	Report	Barrett (yellow card) 36'	Stadium: Spotland Stadium; Attendance: 4,325; Referee: John Mulligan

1 January 2024 27	AFC Fylde	2–0	Rochdale	Wesham
15:00 GMT	Ormerod 56', 62'	Report	Ebanks-Landell (yellow card) 60'; Gilmour (yellow card) 90+12'	Stadium: Mill Farm; Attendance: 2,089; Referee: Andrew Miller

6 January 2024 28	Rochdale	2–0	Kidderminster Harriers	Rochdale
15:00 GMT	Sinclair 59'; Gordon (yellow card) 67'; Henderson 71'; Taylor (yellow card) 90+2'	Report	Richards (yellow card) 16'; Robinson (yellow card) 70'	Stadium: Spotland Stadium; Attendance: 2,507; Referee: Gareth Rhodes

20 January 2024	Rochdale	P–P	Wealdstone	Rochdale
15:00 GMT				Stadium: Spotland Stadium
Note: Postponed due to a frozen pitch.

23 January 2024	Altrincham	P–P	Rochdale	Altrincham
19:45 GMT				Stadium: Moss Lane
Note: Postponed due to a waterlogged pitch.

27 January 2024 29	Aldershot Town	3–1	Rochdale	Aldershot
15:00 GMT	Tolaj 5'; Harries 43' (pen.); Barham 51'	Report	Henderson 10'; Armstrong (yellow card) 84'; Keohane (yellow card) 86'	Stadium: Recreation Ground; Attendance: 3,001; Referee: Aji Ajibola

3 February 2024 30	Rochdale	1–2	Dagenham & Redbridge	Rochdale
15:00 GMT	Sinclair 40'; Ferguson (yellow card) 45+3'; Gilmour (yellow card) 81'	Report	Effiong 9', 45+3' (pen.); Kedwell (yellow card) 45+3'; Pereira (yellow card) 88'	Stadium: Spotland Stadium; Attendance: 2,503; Referee: Sam Mulhall

10 February 2024	Barnet	P–P	Rochdale	Barnet
15:00 GMT				Stadium: The Hive Stadium
Note: Postponed due to Barnet's FA Trophy schedule.

10 February 2024 31	Altrincham	3–0	Rochdale	Altrincham
15:00 GMT	Amaluzor 43' (yellow card) 52'; Linney 66'; Conn-Clarke 67'; Osborne (yellow card) 79'; Banks (yellow card) 90+3'	Report		Stadium: Moss Lane; Attendance: 3,441; Referee: Steven Copeland

17 February 2024 32	Rochdale	1–2	Solihull Moors	Rochdale
15:00 GMT	Hayes 17'; Mitchell (yellow card) 23'; Gordon (yellow card) 57'	Report	Maycock 9'; Campbell 51'; Whitmore (yellow card) 79'	Stadium: Spotland Stadium; Attendance: 2,207; Referee: Paul Marsden

20 February 2024	Rochdale	P–P	Boreham Wood	Rochdale
19:45 GMT				Stadium: Spotland Stadium
Note: Postponed due to a waterlogged pitch.

24 February 2024 33	Chesterfield	2–2	Rochdale	Chesterfield
15:00 GMT	Naylor (yellow card) 38' (goal) 47'; Williams (yellow card) 45+1'; Mandeville (yellow card) 54'; Grigg 64'	Report	Rodney (yellow card) 15' (goal) 80'; Gilmour (yellow card) 36'; Nevett (yellow card) 46'; Mellor 70'	Stadium: SMH Group Stadium; Attendance: 8,301; Referee: Andrew Miller

27 February 2024 34	Rochdale	3–0	Wealdstone	Rochdale
19:45 GMT	Ebanks-Landell 26'; Hayes 45', 45+2'; Gilmour (yellow card) 90'	Report	Cook (yellow card) 29'; Mason (yellow card) 42'; Dyer (yellow card) 57'; Mundle-Smith (yellow card) 61'	Stadium: Spotland Stadium; Attendance: 1,836; Referee: David Mcnamara

2 March 2024 35	Ebbsfleet United	2–1	Rochdale	Northfleet
15:00 GMT	Poleon 15'; Samuel 90+2'	Report	Mitchell 41'; East (yellow card) 57'; Hayes (yellow card) 90+1'	Stadium: Stonebridge Road; Attendance: 1,723; Referee: James Westgate

5 March 2024 36	Barnet	2–0	Rochdale	Barnet
19:45 GMT	Stead 1', 72'; Pritchard (yellow card) 45+4'	Report	Hayes (yellow card) 37'; Sassi (yellow card) 87'; Ebanks-Landell (yellow card) 90+1'	Stadium: The Hive Stadium; Attendance: 1,072; Referee: Jason Richardson

9 March 2024 37	Rochdale	2–2	Oxford City	Rochdale
15:00 GMT	Mitchell 11' (yellow card) 90+6'; Mather 77'	Report	Greenslade 27'; Parker 35' (yellow card) 90+6'; Phillips (yellow card) 57'; Ashby (yellow card) 81'; O'Connell (yellow card) 90+8'	Stadium: Spotland Stadium; Attendance: 2,303; Referee: Gareth Rhodes

12 March 2024 38	Rochdale	2–1	Woking	Rochdale
19:45 GMT	Hayes 37'; Gilmour (yellow card) 78'; Rodney 88'; Henderson (red card) 89'	Report	Kendall 15'; Odusina (yellow card) 58'; Kelly-Evans (red card) 66'; Casey (yellow card) 72'; Pavey (yellow card) 87'	Stadium: Spotland Stadium; Attendance: 1,529; Referee: Michael Barlow

16 March 2024 39	Eastleigh	1–4	Rochdale	Eastleigh
15:00 GMT	McCallum 31'; Nwabuokei (yellow card) 57'	Report	Mitchell 28', 79'; Keohane 45'; Rodney 71'	Stadium: Ten Acres; Attendance: 2,257; Referee: Paul Johnson

23 March 2024 40	Rochdale	1–0	Maidenhead United	Rochdale
15:00 GMT	Keohane (yellow card) 35'; Rodney 38'	Report		Stadium: Spotland Stadium; Attendance: 2,267; Referee: Dale Baines

29 March 2024 41	Gateshead	1–0	Rochdale	Gateshead
15:00 GMT	Brown (yellow card) 20' (goal) 26'; Richardson (yellow card) 63'; Booty (yellow card) 74'; Francis (yellow card) 78'; Hannant (yellow card) 90+1'	Report	Mitchell (yellow card) 45+1'; Gilmour (yellow card) 80'	Stadium: Gateshead International Stadium; Attendance: 1,760; Referee: Benjamin Wyatt

1 April 2024 42	Rochdale	1–1	Hartlepool United	Rochdale
15:00 BST	Mitchell (red card) 39'; Gordon (yellow card) 89'; Rodney 90+5'	Report	Grey 65'; Stephenson (yellow card) 66'; Crawford (yellow card) 78'; Parkes (yellow card) 90+3'	Stadium: Spotland Stadium; Attendance: 2,784; Referee: Richard Eley

6 April 2024 43	Oldham Athletic	1–1	Rochdale	Oldham
12:30 BST	Gardner (yellow card) 6'; Hope 6'; Norwood (yellow card) 96+6'	Report	Mather 27'; Gordon (yellow card) 62'	Stadium: Boundary Park; Attendance: 8,797; Referee: Ruebyn Ricardo

9 April 2024	Rochdale	P–P	Boreham Wood	Rochdale
19:45 BST				Stadium: Spotland Stadium
Note: Postponed due to a waterlogged pitch.

13 April 2024 44	Rochdale	1–1	Dorking Wanderers	Rochdale
15:00 BST	Rodney 54' (yellow card) 85'	Report	Philpott (yellow card) 14'; Carter 48'; Kuhl (yellow card) 58'; Muitt (yellow card) 63'; Moore (yellow card) 89'	Stadium: Spotland Stadium; Attendance: 2,832; Referee: John Mulligan

16 April 2024 45	Rochdale	0–0	Boreham Wood	Rochdale
19:45 BST		Report	Sagaf (yellow card) 21'	Stadium: Spotland Stadium; Attendance: 1,797; Referee: Oliver Mackey

20 April 2024 46	Southend United	1–2	Rochdale	Southend
12:15 BST	Scott-Morriss 8' (yellow card) 85'	Report	Rodney (yellow card) 14' (goal) 90+1'; Hayes 42'; Brooks (yellow card) 66'	Stadium: Roots Hall; Attendance: 7,947; Referee: Paul Johnson

=== FA Cup ===
Rochdale joined the 2023-24 FA Cup at the Fourth Qualifying Round
Win Draw Loss Fixtures

14 October 2023 Q4	Hereford	1–0	Rochdale	Hereford
15:00 BST	Freemantle 78'	Report		Stadium: Edgar Street; Referee: Aji Ajibola

=== FA Trophy ===
Win Draw Loss Fixtures

9 December 2023 3	Rochdale	P–P	Gateshead	Rochdale
15:00 GMT				Stadium: Spotland Stadium
Note: Postponed due to a waterlogged pitch.

12 December 2023 3	Rochdale	1–5	Gateshead	Rochdale
19:45 GMT	Sinclair 73' (pen.)	Report	McBride 45+3'; Chadwick 51'; Whelan 54'; Dinanga 90+2', 90+5'	Stadium: Spotland Stadium; Attendance: 1,107; Referee: Steven Copeland
