= Ryan East =

English footballer (born 1998)

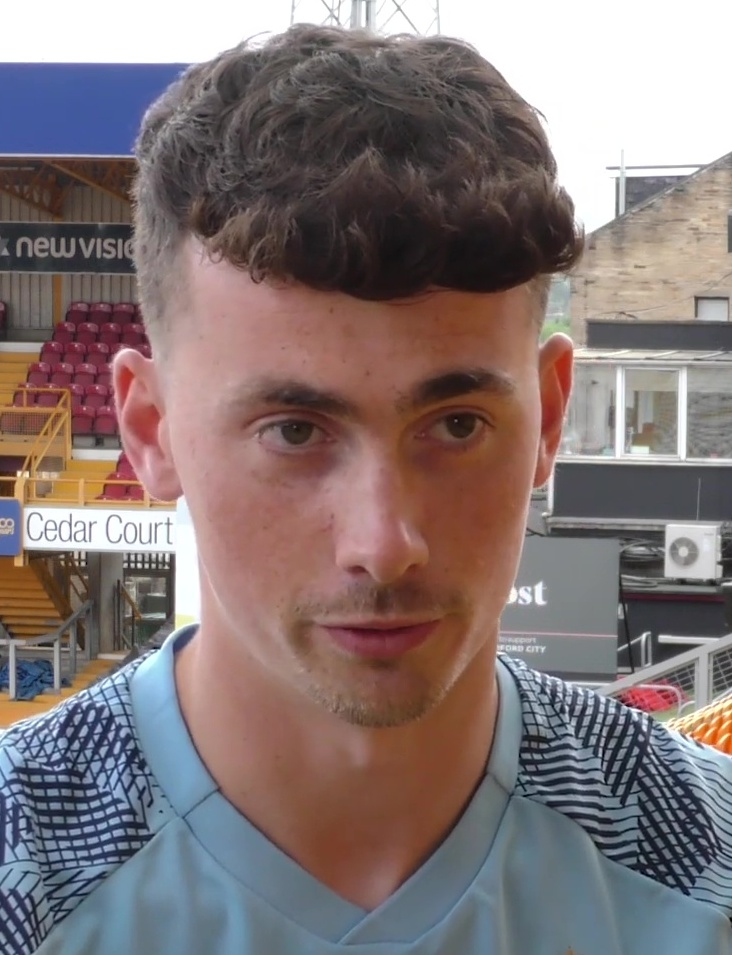
- East in 2022

Personal information
- Full name: Ryan Henry East
- Date of birth: 7 August 1998 (age 28)
- Place of birth: Surrey, England
- Height: 1.76 m (5 ft 9 in)
- Position: Midfielder

Team information
- Current team: Rochdale
- Number: 4

Youth career
- 2008–2019: Reading

Senior career*
Years	Team	Apps	(Gls)
2019–2021	Reading	1	(0)
2021–2022	Swindon Town	16	(0)
2022–2023	Bradford City	18	(0)
2023	→ Rochdale (loan)	24	(4)
2023–	Rochdale	101	(8)
- * Club domestic league appearances and goals as of 22:29, 6 July 2026 (UTC)

Ryan Henry East (born 7 August 1998) is an English professional footballer who plays as a midfielder for EFL League Two club Rochdale.

== Career ==
=== Reading ===
On 1 July 2016, East signed his first professional contract with Reading, extending it on 6 July 2017. On 12 March 2019, East signed a new contract, until the summer of 2021, and made his first team debut for Reading, becoming the 50th graduate from the club's academy.

=== Swindon Town ===
On 7 August 2021, East signed for Swindon Town on a one-year contract following a trial. East was released at the end of this one-year deal following defeat in the play-offs.

=== Bradford City ===
On 27 May 2022, East joined Bradford City on an initial two-year deal.

=== Rochdale ===
On 14 August 2023, East joined Rochdale on a season-long loan. The transfer was made permanent in December 2023.

On 7 August 2024, East signed a new contract until the summer of 2026.

== Career statistics ==
As of 1 August 2026

Appearances and goals by club, season and competition
Club	Season	League			FA Cup		EFL Cup		Other		Total	
Club	Season	Division	Apps	Goals	Apps	Goals	Apps	Goals	Apps	Goals	Apps	Goals
Reading U21	2016–17	—			—		—		0	0	0	0
Reading U21	2017–18	—			—		—		3 (Note: Appearances in EFL Trophy)	0	3	0
Reading U21	Total		—		—		—		3	0	3	0
Reading	2017–18	Championship	0	0	0	0	0	0	—		0	0
Reading	2018–19	Championship	1	0	0	0	0	0	—		1	0
Reading	2019–20	Championship	0	0	0	0	0	0	—		0	0
Reading	2020–21	Championship	0	0	0	0	0	0	—		0	0
Reading	Total		1	0	0	0	0	0	—		1	0
Swindon Town	2021–22	League Two	16	0	2	0	1	0	4	0	23	0
Bradford City	2022–23	League Two	18	0	1	0	2	0	5 (Note: Four appearances in EFL Trophy and one appearance in League Two play-offs)	0	26	0
Bradford City	2023–24	League Two	0	0	0	0	0	0	0	0	0	0
Bradford City	Total		18	0	1	0	2	0	5	0	26	0
Rochdale (loan)	2023–24	National League	24	4	0	0	—		0	0	24	4
Rochdale	2023–24	National League	20	0	0	0	—		0	0	20	0
Rochdale	2024–25	National League	37	2	1	0	—		2 (Note: One appearance in FA Trophy and one appearance in National League play-offs)	0	40	2
Rochdale	2025–26	National League	44	6	0	0	—		5 (Note: Three appearances in National League Cup and two appearances in National League play-offs)	0	49	6
Rochdale	2026–27	League Two	0	0	0	0	1	1	0	0	1	1
Rochdale	Total		101	8	1	0	1	1	7	0	110	9
Career total			160	12	4	0	4	1	19	0	187	13

== Honours ==
Rochdale

- National League play-offs: 2026
