= Kwaku Oduroh =

English footballer (born 2002)

Personal information
- Full name: Kwaku Nuamah Oduroh
- Date of birth: 16 October 2002 (age 24)
- Place of birth: Manchester, England
- Position: Defender

Youth career
- 2008–2022: Manchester City

Senior career*
Years	Team	Apps	(Gls)
2022–2024	Derby County	0	(0)
2023–2024	→ Rochdale (loan)	20	(1)
2024	→ Hartlepool United (loan)	2	(0)
Total		22	(1)
- * Club domestic league appearances and goals

Kwaku Nuamah Oduroh (born 16 October 2002) is an English former professional footballer who played as a defender.

He has played for Manchester City, before joining Derby County in 2022, whilst at Derby Oduroh had loan spells at Rochdale and Hartlepool United.

== Career ==
Oduroh began his career at Manchester City, leaving the club in the summer of 2022 (after 14 years) and undergoing a trial at Derby County. He signed a two-year contract with Derby in July 2022.

He made his debut for Derby County in a Carabao Cup tie away to Mansfield Town on 9 August 2022. Oduroh mainly played for the clubs under-21 side, as his six first team appearances during the 2022–23 season were made in cup competitions.

On 5 July 2023 it was announced that Oduroh would join National League side Rochdale on loan for the 2023–24 season. Oduroh's loan was terminated early by Rochdale on 10 January 2024, Oduroh made 22 appearances for Rochdale during his six month loan stay, scoring one goal, his first in senior football against AFC Fylde on Boxing Day 2023.

On 1 March 2024, Oduroh signed for National League club Hartlepool United on loan for the rest of the 2023–24 season. He made two appearances for the club.

On 18 May 2024, it was announced that Oduroh would leave Derby at the end of his contract on 30 June 2024. He retired in 2025 after a year without a club, aged 22.

== Personal life ==
Oduroh is of Ghanaian descent.

== Career statistics ==
As of match played 26 March 2024

Appearances and goals by club, season and competition
Club	Season	League			FA Cup		League Cup		Other		Total	
Club	Season	Division	Apps	Goals	Apps	Goals	Apps	Goals	Apps	Goals	Apps	Goals
Manchester City U-23	2021–22	—			—		—		2 (Note: Appearances in EFL Trophy)	0	2	0
Derby County	2022–23	League One	0	0	1	0	2	0	3	0	6	0
Derby County	2023–24	League One	0	0	0	0	0	0	0	0	0	0
Derby County	Total		0	0	1	0	2	0	5	0	8	0
Rochdale (loan)	2023–24	National League	20	1	1	0	0	0	1 (Note: Appearance in FA Trophy)	0	22	1
Hartlepool United (loan)	2023–24	National League	2	0	0	0	0	0	0	0	2	0
Career total			22	1	2	0	2	0	6	0	32	1
