= Kairo Mitchell =

Grenadian association football player

Personal information
- Full name: Kairo Ellis Mitchell
- Date of birth: 21 October 1997 (age 29)
- Place of birth: Leicester, England
- Height: 1.86 m (6 ft 1 in)
- Position: Striker

Team information
- Current team: Forest Green Rovers
- Number: 21

Youth career
- –2016: Leicester City

Senior career*
Years	Team	Apps	(Gls)
2016–2017	Leicester City	0	(0)
2017–2018	Nuneaton Borough	24	(1)
2018–2020	Coalville Town	57	(21)
2020	Dartford	0	(0)
2020–2021	King's Lynn Town	20	(7)
2021	Chesterfield	8	(1)
2021–2023	Notts County	41	(3)
2023	→ Eastleigh (loan)	13	(4)
2023–2025	Rochdale	82	(28)
2025–	Forest Green Rovers	14	(4)

International career^{‡}
2017–2023	Grenada	15	(2)
- * Club domestic league appearances and goals as of 17:10, 21 October 2025 (UTC) ‡ National team caps and goals as of 17:10, 21 October 2025 (UTC)

Kairo Ellis Mitchell (born 21 October 1997) is a Grenadaian footballer who is a striker for Forest Green Rovers and the Grenada national team.

== Club career ==
=== Early career ===
A product of the Leicester City F.C. Reserves and Academy, Mitchell had a successful season with Leicester's under-18s in the 2015–16 season, as well as appearing for the reserves. When he finished his scholarship with Leicester City, he was offered a contract. A year later, he was released by Leicester when his contract expired.

=== Nuneaton Town ===
In 2017, following his release from Leicester, Mitchell joined National League North side Nuneaton Town. On 27 August 2018, Mitchell scored his first league goal for the club, in a 3–1 defeat to Brackley Town.

=== Coalville Town ===
In November 2018, Mitchell joined Coalville Town on an 18-month contract. He scored on his debut in a 1–1 draw against St Neots Town the following day.

=== Dartford ===
On 2 October 2020, Mitchell joined Dartford. His only appearance for the club came as a substitute in a 1–0 home defeat to Slough Town the FA Cup Second Qualifying Round on Saturday 3 October 2020.

=== King's Lynn Town ===
On 22 October 2020, Mitchell joined King's Lynn Town.

=== Chesterfield ===
On 10 April 2021, with King's Lynn due to play Chesterfield, it was announced that Mitchell had joined the Derbyshire club for an undisclosed fee subject to league approval. Although ineligible to play in the match, Mitchell's new club came from behind to win 2–1.

=== Notts County ===
On 3 August 2021, Mitchell signed for Notts County for an undisclosed fee on a two-year contract.

On 2 February 2023, Mitchell signed for Eastleigh on loan until the end of the season. He was released following Notts County's promotion at the end of the 2022–23 season.

=== Rochdale ===
On 16 June 2023, Mitchell signed for recently relegated National League club Rochdale on a two-year contract.

Having scored seven goals in six matches, Mitchell was named National League Player of the Month for September 2024. On 23 May 2025, he was released by Rochdale on the expiry of his contract, having scored 14 league goals in the 2024–25 season.

=== Forest Green Rovers ===
On 12 July 2025, Kairo Mitchell signed with National League club Forest Green Rovers.

== International career ==
Mitchell debuted for the Grenada national team in a 5–0 friendly loss to Panama on 25 October 2017.

== Career statistics ==
=== Club ===
As of match played 13 October 2025

Appearances and goals by club, season and competition
Club	Season	League			FA Cup		EFL Cup		Other		Total	
Club	Season	Division	Apps	Goals	Apps	Goals	Apps	Goals	Apps	Goals	Apps	Goals
Leicester City	2016–17	Premier League	0	0	0	0	0	0	0	0	0	0
Nuneaton Borough	2017–18	National League North	14	0	0	0	—		0	0	14	0
Nuneaton Borough	2018–19	National League North	10	1	2	1	—		0	0	12	2
Nuneaton Borough	Total		24	1	2	1	0	0	0	0	26	2
Coalville Town	2018–19	Southern League Premier Central	30	10	0	0	—		0	0	30	10
Coalville Town	2019–20	Southern League Premier Central	27	11	1	0	—		2 (Note: Appearance(s) in FA Trophy)	0	30	11
Coalville Town	Total		57	21	1	0	0	0	2	0	60	21
Dartford	2020–21	National League South	0	0	1	0	—		0	0	1	0
King's Lynn Town	2020–21	National League	20	7	0	0	—		2	1	22	8
Chesterfield	2020–21	National League	8	1	—		—		0	0	8	1
Notts County	2021–22	National League	26	1	1	0	—		1	1	28	2
Notts County	2022–23	National League	15	2	1	0	—		0	0	16	2
Notts County	Total		41	3	2	0	0	0	1	1	44	4
Eastleigh (loan)	2022–23	National League	13	4	—		—		0	0	13	4
Rochdale	2023–24	National League	38	14	0	0	—		0	0	38	14
Rochdale	2024–25	National League	44	14	2	3	—		3 (Note: Two appearances and two goals in FA Trophy, one appearance in National League play-offs)	2	49	19
Rochdale	Total		82	28	2	3	0	0	3	2	87	33
Forest Green Rovers	2025–26	National League	14	4	1	0	—		0	0	15	4
Career total			259	69	9	4	0	0	8	4	276	77

=== International ===
Appearances and goals by national team and year
National team	Year	Apps	Goals
Grenada	2017	2	0
Grenada	2018	3	1
Grenada	2019	5	1
Grenada	2020	0	0
Grenada	2021	3	0
Grenada	2022	1	0
Grenada	2023	1	0
Total		15	2

Scores and results list Grenada's goal tally first, score column indicates score after each Mitchell goal.

List of international goals scored by Kairo Mitchell
No.	Date	Venue	Opponent	Score	Result	Competition
1	22 March 2018	Isidoro Beaton Stadium, Belmopan, Belize	Belize	2–3	2–4	Friendly
2	5 September 2019	Kirani James Athletic Stadium, St. George's, Grenada	Saint Kitts and Nevis	1–0	2–1	2019–20 CONCACAF Nations League B

== Honours ==
Individual

- National League Player of the Month: September 2024
