= Ethan Ebanks-Landell =

English footballer (born 1992)

Personal information
- Full name: Ethan Reid Ebanks-Landell
- Date of birth: 16 December 1992 (age 33)
- Place of birth: West Bromwich, England
- Height: 1.88 m (6 ft 2 in)
- Position: Defender

Team information
- Current team: Rochdale
- Number: 6

Youth career
- 2001–2010: Wolverhampton Wanderers

Senior career*
Years	Team	Apps	(Gls)
2010–2019	Wolverhampton Wanderers	42	(5)
2012–2013	→ Bury (loan)	69	(0)
2013	→ Bury (loan)	18	(0)
2016–2017	→ Sheffield United (loan)	34	(5)
2017–2018	→ Milton Keynes Dons (loan)	29	(2)
2019	→ Rochdale (loan)	16	(2)
2019–2022	Shrewsbury Town	102	(2)
2022–	Rochdale	143	(6)
- * Club domestic league appearances and goals as of 26 April 2026 (UTC)

Ethan Reid Ebanks-Landell (born 16 December 1992) is an English professional footballer who plays as a defender for EFL League Two club Rochdale.

== Career ==
=== Wolverhampton Wanderers ===
Ebanks-Landell is a product of Wolverhampton Wanderers' academy, who joined aged nine; he signed his first professional contract with the club in 2010. His first involvement with the first team occurred in December 2010 when he was an unused substitute for a Premier League win against Birmingham.

After returning from a loan spell at Bury, Ebanks-Landell finally made his Wolves debut on 6 August 2013 when he started a League Cup defeat at Morecambe. His first league appearance for the club came on 26 October 2013 when he came on as a substitute in a 2–1 victory at Bradford. On 16 November 2013 he scored his first senior goal, when he netted the only goal of the game against Notts County. He scored a second goal – against Leyton Orient – before suffering damage to his knee ligaments in a game at Tranmere on New Years Day 2014.

=== Bury (loan) ===
In November 2012, the defender moved on loan to League One team Bury until 3 January 2013. Here, he made his professional debut on 17 November 2012 in a 0–2 defeat at Colchester, the first of eight appearances for the club. While at Bury, Ebanks-Landell established himself in the first team at Bury, playing in the centre-back position, though he would play in a different position and earning praise from manager Kevin Blackwell. Financial troubles though meant that Bury were forced to return their loan signings in January 2013, however, Ebanks-Landell was soon permitted to rejoin Bury on 10 January 2013 initially on loan for another month, making his return to their first team two days later, in a 1–1 draw against MK Dons. His loan spell was subsequently extended in February to run until the end of the season as the team unsuccessfully fought to avoid relegation to League Two.

=== Sheffield United (loan) ===
On 31 August 2016, having not featured for Wolves since March, Ebanks-Landell moved on a season-long loan to League One side Sheffield United.

Ebanks-Landell made his Blades debut as a substitute in the 2–1 victory at Gillingham on 4 September 2016. He made his full debut in the 3–2 victory at AFC Wimbledon on 10 September 2016 and cemented his place with a string of commanding performances in the back three, scoring vital goals including an injury time equaliser at Fleetwood Town on 1 October 2016, a double at home to Port Vale on 15 October 2016 and an injury time winner at home to Bury on 22 November 2016.

Ebanks-Landell played in 14 successive league games for Sheffield United before tasting his first defeat in the 1–0 home defeat to Walsall on 29 November 2016 in a game watched by Paul Lambert the new Wolves manager. After much speculation over whether he would be recalled to Wolves in the January transfer window he signed a new three-and-a-half-year deal with Wolves on 9 January 2017 but was allowed to remain on loan at Sheffield United for the rest of the season. Ebanks-Landell credited his teammates and staff at Sheffield United for helping him to win his new contract.

=== Milton Keynes Dons (loan) ===
On 14 July 2017, Ebanks-Landell joined League One side Milton Keynes Dons until the end of the 2017–18 season.

=== Rochdale ===
On 11 January 2019, Ebanks-Landell joined League One side Rochdale until the end of the 2018–19 season.

=== Shrewsbury Town ===
On 29 May 2019, it was announced that Ebanks-Landell had joined League One side Shrewsbury Town on a 3-year deal for an undisclosed fee. He made his competitive debut for the club on 3 August, starting in a 1–0 home win over Portsmouth, the first league game of the season.

=== Return to Rochdale ===
On 13 June 2022, Ebanks-Landell returned to Rochdale on a two-year permanent deal upon the expiration of his Shrewsbury Town contract.

On 5 June 2024, Ebanks-Landell signed a new two-year contract with Rochdale.

== Personal life ==
Born in England, Ebanks-Landell is of Jamaican descent.

== Career statistics ==
As of match played 13 September 2025

Appearances and goals by club, season and competition
Club	Season	League			FA Cup		League Cup		Other		Total	
Club	Season	Division	Apps	Goals	Apps	Goals	Apps	Goals	Apps	Goals	Apps	Goals
Wolverhampton Wanderers	2012–13	Championship	0	0	0	0	0	0	—		0	0
Wolverhampton Wanderers	2013–14	League One	7	2	1	0	1	0	1 (Note: Appearance(s) in Football League Trophy)	0	10	2
Wolverhampton Wanderers	2014–15	Championship	14	2	0	0	1	0	—		15	2
Wolverhampton Wanderers	2015–16	Championship	21	1	1	0	3	0	—		25	1
Wolverhampton Wanderers	2016–17	Championship	0	0	0	0	0	0	—		0	0
Wolverhampton Wanderers	2017–18	Championship	0	0	0	0	0	0	—		0	0
Wolverhampton Wanderers	2018–19	Premier League	0	0	0	0	0	0	—		0	0
Wolverhampton Wanderers	Total		42	5	2	0	5	0	1	0	50	5
Bury (loan)	2012–13	League One	6	0	2	0	0	0	0	0	8	0
Bury (loan)	2012–13	League One	18	0	—		—		—		18	0
Wolverhampton Wanderers U21	2016–17	—			—		—		1	0	1	0
Sheffield United (loan)	2016–17	League One	34	5	0	0	0	0	0	0	34	5
MK Dons (loan)	2017–18	League One	29	2	4	1	1	0	1	0	35	3
Rochdale (loan)	2018–19	League One	16	2	—		—		—		16	2
Shrewsbury Town	2019–20	League One	28	1	7	0	1	0	2	0	38	1
Shrewsbury Town	2020–21	League One	41	1	3	0	1	0	2	0	47	1
Shrewsbury Town	2021–22	League One	33	0	3	0	1	0	3	0	40	0
Shrewsbury Town	Total		102	2	13	0	3	0	7	0	125	2
Rochdale	2022–23	League Two	39	1	1	0	2	0	0	0	42	1
Rochdale	2023–24	National League	45	3	0	0	—		0	0	45	3
Rochdale	2024–25	National League	16	0	0	0	—		2 (Note: One appearance in FA Trophy, one appearance in National League play-offs)	0	18	0
Rochdale	2025–26	National League	7	1	0	0	—		0	0	7	1
Rochdale	Total		107	5	1	0	2	0	2	0	112	5
Career total			354	21	22	1	11	0	12	0	399	22

== Honours ==
Sheffield United

- EFL League One: 2016–17

Rochdale

- National League play-offs: 2026
