= 2016–17 Sheffield United F.C. season =

Sheffield United F.C.
2016–17 season
- Chairman: Kevin McCabe
- Manager: Chris Wilder
- Stadium: Bramall Lane
- League One: 1st
- FA Cup: Second round
- EFL Cup: First round
- EFL Trophy: First round
- Top goalscorer: Billy Sharp (30)
- Average home league attendance: 21,892
| Home colours | Away colours |

The 2016–17 season was Sheffield United's 128th season in their history and their sixth consecutive season in League One. It was manager and boyhood Blade Chris Wilder’s first season in charge, with the Blades accumulating 100 points, promoting them as champions to the Championship. Along with League One, the club also competed in the FA Cup, EFL Cup and EFL Trophy. The season covers the period from 1 July 2016 to 30 June 2017.

== Squad ==
| No. | Name | Pos. | Nat. | Place of Birth | Age | Apps | Goals | Signed from | Date signed | Fee | Contract End |
Goalkeepers
| 1 | George Long | GK | (England) | Sheffield | 23 | 123 | 0 | Academy | 1 July 2011 | Trainee | 2018 |
| 25 | Simon Moore | GK | (England) | Sandown | 27 | 44 | 0 | Cardiff City | 19 August 2016 | Undisclosed | 2019 |
Defenders
| 3 | Chris Hussey | LB | (England) | London | 28 | 11 | 0 | Bury | 1 July 2016 | Undisclosed | Undisclosed |
| 5 | Jack O'Connell | CB | (England) | Liverpool | 23 | 50 | 6 | Brentford | 8 July 2016 | Undisclosed | 2019 |
| 13 | Jake Wright | CB | (England) | Keighley | 31 | 31 | 0 | Oxford United | 9 July 2016 | Free | 2018 |
| 14 | Joe Riley | LB | (England) | Blackpool | 20 | 2 | 0 | Manchester United | 17 January 2017 | Loan | 2017 |
| 18 | Kieron Freeman | RB | (Wales) (England) | Arnold | 25 | 100 | 14 | Derby County | 23 January 2015 | Free | 2017 |
| 19 | Ethan Ebanks-Landell | CB | (England) | West Bromwich | 24 | 34 | 5 | Wolverhampton Wanderers | 31 August 2016 | Loan | 2017 |
| 20 | James Wilson | CB | (Wales) | Chepstow | 28 | 10 | 1 | Oldham Athletic | 5 July 2016 | Free | 2018 |
| 24 | Daniel Lafferty | LB | (Northern Ireland) | Derry | 28 | 36 | 4 | Burnley | 13 January 2017 | Undisclosed | 2019 |
Midfielders
| 4 | John Fleck | CM | (Scotland) | Glasgow | 25 | 49 | 4 | Coventry City | 11 July 2016 | Free | 2019 |
| 6 | Chris Basham | DM/CB | (England) | Hebburn | 28 | 137 | 7 | Blackpool | 1 July 2014 | Free | 2017 |
| 8 | Stefan Scougall | AM | (Scotland) | Edinburgh | 24 | 100 | 10 | Livingston | 24 January 2014 | £400,000 | 2017 |
| 15 | Paul Coutts | CM | (Scotland) | Aberdeen | 28 | 104 | 4 | Derby County | 23 January 2015 | Undisclosed | 2017 |
| 21 | Mark Duffy | RM | (England) | Liverpool | 31 | 44 | 6 | Birmingham City | 1 July 2016 | Free | 2018 |
| 22 | Louis Reed | CM | (England) | Barnsley | 19 | 59 | 0 | Academy | 1 July 2013 | Trainee | 2018 |
| 26 | Jay O'Shea | AM | (Republic of Ireland) | Dublin | 28 | 10 | 3 | Chesterfield | 24 January 2017 | Loan | 2017 |
| 32 | Harry Chapman | RW | (England) | Hartlepool | 19 | 14 | 4 | Middlesbrough | 12 August 2016 | Loan | 2017 |
| 44 | Samir Carruthers | CM | (Republic of Ireland) (Wales) | Islington | 24 | 14 | 0 | Milton Keynes Dons | 3 January 2017 | £250,000 | 2020 |
Forwards
| 7 | Marc McNulty | CF | (Scotland) | Edinburgh | 24 | 56 | 14 | Livingston | 21 May 2014 | £125,000 | 2017 |
| 9 | Caolan Lavery | CF | (Northern Ireland) (Canada) | Red Deer | 24 | 30 | 4 | Sheffield Wednesday | 30 August 2016 | Free | 2019 |
| 10 | Billy Sharp | CF | (England) | Sheffield | 31 | 198 | 63 | Leeds United | 25 July 2015 | Undisclosed | 2017 |
| 11 | Matt Done | LW/SS | (England) | Oswestry | 28 | 87 | 17 | Rochdale | 2 February 2015 | Undisclosed | 2017 |
| 16 | James Hanson | CF | (England) | Bradford | 29 | 13 | 1 | Bradford City | 24 January 2017 | Undisclosed | 2020 |
| 27 | Leon Clarke | CF | (England) | Birmingham | 32 | 26 | 9 | Bury | 27 July 2016 | Undisclosed | 2019 |
Out on Loan
| 2 | John Brayford | RB | (England) | Stoke-on-Trent | 29 | 68 | 4 | Cardiff City | 24 January 2015 | £2,000,000 | 2018 |
| 17 | Kieran Wallace | DF/CM | (England) | Nottingham | 22 | 23 | 0 | Ilkeston | 28 November 2014 | Free | Undisclosed |
| 23 | Ben Whiteman | CM | (England) | Rochdale | 21 | 12 | 0 | Academy | 1 July 2014 | Trainee | Undisclosed |

=== Statistics ===
As of 5 May 2017

| No. | Pos | Nat | Player | Total | | League One | | FA Cup | | EFL Cup | | EFL Trophy | |
| No. | Pos | Nat | Player | Apps | Goals | Apps | Goals | Apps | Goals | Apps | Goals | Apps | Goals |
|---|---|---|---|---|---|---|---|---|---|---|---|---|---|
| 1 | GK | (England) ENG | George Long | 5 | 0 | 3+0 | 0 | 0+0 | 0 | 1+0 | 0 | 1+0 | 0 |
| 3 | DF | (England) ENG | Chris Hussey | 11 | 0 | 5+2 | 0 | 1+0 | 0 | 1+0 | 0 | 2+0 | 0 |
| 4 | MF | (Scotland) SCO | John Fleck | 49 | 4 | 41+3 | 4 | 2+0 | 0 | 1+0 | 0 | 2+0 | 0 |
| 5 | DF | (England) ENG | Jack O'Connell | 50 | 6 | 40+4 | 4 | 2+0 | 1 | 1+0 | 0 | 3+0 | 1 |
| 6 | MF | (England) ENG | Chris Basham | 48 | 3 | 42+1 | 2 | 2+0 | 1 | 1+0 | 0 | 2+0 | 0 |
| 7 | FW | (Scotland) SCO | Marc McNulty | 5 | 0 | 1+3 | 0 | 0+0 | 0 | 0+1 | 0 | 0+0 | 0 |
| 8 | MF | (Scotland) SCO | Stefan Scougall | 29 | 5 | 6+19 | 4 | 2+0 | 1 | 0+1 | 0 | 1+0 | 0 |
| 9 | FW | (Northern Ireland) NIR | Caolan Lavery | 30 | 4 | 6+21 | 4 | 1+1 | 0 | 0+0 | 0 | 1+0 | 0 |
| 10 | FW | (England) ENG | Billy Sharp | 49 | 30 | 44+2 | 30 | 0+1 | 0 | 1+0 | 0 | 1+0 | 0 |
| 11 | FW | (England) ENG | Matt Done | 35 | 3 | 24+7 | 3 | 0+0 | 0 | 1+0 | 0 | 2+1 | 0 |
| 13 | DF | (England) ENG | Jake Wright | 31 | 0 | 28+2 | 0 | 1+0 | 0 | 0+0 | 0 | 0+0 | 0 |
| 14 | MF | (England) ENG | Joe Riley | 2 | 0 | 1+1 | 0 | 0+0 | 0 | 0+0 | 0 | 0+0 | 0 |
| 15 | MF | (Scotland) SCO | Paul Coutts | 47 | 3 | 40+3 | 2 | 2+0 | 0 | 0+0 | 0 | 1+1 | 1 |
| 16 | FW | (England) ENG | James Hanson | 13 | 1 | 10+3 | 1 | 0+0 | 0 | 0+0 | 0 | 0+0 | 0 |
| 18 | DF | (Wales) WAL | Kieron Freeman | 45 | 11 | 38+2 | 10 | 2+0 | 1 | 0+0 | 0 | 2+1 | 0 |
| 19 | DF | (England) ENG | Ethan Ebanks-Landell | 34 | 5 | 29+5 | 5 | 0+0 | 0 | 0+0 | 0 | 0+0 | 0 |
| 20 | DF | (Wales) WAL | James Wilson | 10 | 1 | 7+0 | 1 | 0+0 | 0 | 1+0 | 0 | 2+0 | 0 |
| 21 | MF | (England) ENG | Mark Duffy | 44 | 6 | 38+1 | 6 | 1+1 | 0 | 1+0 | 0 | 1+1 | 0 |
| 22 | MF | (England) ENG | Louis Reed | 1 | 0 | 0+0 | 0 | 0+0 | 0 | 0+0 | 0 | 1+0 | 0 |
| 24 | DF | (Northern Ireland) NIR | Danny Lafferty | 36 | 4 | 35+0 | 4 | 1+0 | 0 | 0+0 | 0 | 0+0 | 0 |
| 25 | GK | (England) ENG | Simon Moore | 45 | 0 | 43+0 | 0 | 0+0 | 0 | 0+0 | 0 | 2+0 | 0 |
| 26 | MF | (Republic of Ireland) IRL | Jay O'Shea | 10 | 3 | 5+5 | 3 | 0+0 | 0 | 0+0 | 0 | 0+0 | 0 |
| 27 | FW | (England) ENG | Leon Clarke | 26 | 9 | 12+11 | 7 | 1+0 | 0 | 1+0 | 1 | 0+1 | 1 |
| 32 | MF | (England) ENG | Harry Chapman | 14 | 4 | 0+12 | 1 | 1+0 | 3 | 0+0 | 0 | 1+0 | 0 |
| 35 | DF | (Republic of Ireland) IRL | Graham Kelly | 1 | 0 | 0+0 | 0 | 0+0 | 0 | 0+0 | 0 | 1+0 | 0 |
| 36 | MF | (England) ENG | David Brooks | 4 | 0 | 0+0 | 0 | 0+1 | 0 | 0+0 | 0 | 2+1 | 0 |
| 37 | MF | (England) ENG | Jordan Hallam | 1 | 0 | 0+0 | 0 | 0+0 | 0 | 0+0 | 0 | 1+0 | 0 |
| 38 | MF | (England) ENG | Regan Slater | 1 | 1 | 0+0 | 0 | 0+0 | 0 | 0+0 | 0 | 1+0 | 1 |
| 43 | DF | (England) ENG | Jo Cummings | 1 | 0 | 0+0 | 0 | 0+0 | 0 | 0+0 | 0 | 0+1 | 0 |
| 44 | MF | (Republic of Ireland) IRL | Samir Carruthers | 14 | 0 | 2+12 | 0 | 0+0 | 0 | 0+0 | 0 | 0+0 | 0 |
Out on Loan:
| 2 | DF | (England) ENG | John Brayford | 4 | 0 | 3+0 | 0 | 0+0 | 0 | 1+0 | 0 | 0+0 | 0 |
| 23 | MF | (England) ENG | Ben Whiteman | 5 | 0 | 0+2 | 0 | 0+1 | 0 | 0+0 | 0 | 1+1 | 0 |
Players who left the club during the season:
| 9 | FW | (England) ENG | Che Adams | 1 | 0 | 0+1 | 0 | 0+0 | 0 | 0+0 | 0 | 0+0 | 0 |
| 12 | GK | (England) ENG | Aaron Ramsdale | 2 | 0 | 0+0 | 0 | 2+0 | 0 | 0+0 | 0 | 0+0 | 0 |
| 14 | DF | (England) ENG | Reece Brown | 5 | 0 | 0+2 | 0 | 1+0 | 0 | 0+0 | 0 | 2+0 | 0 |
| 14 | FW | (England) ENG | Dominic Calvert-Lewin | 1 | 0 | 0+0 | 0 | 0+0 | 0 | 0+1 | 0 | 0+0 | 0 |

==== Goals record ====
As of 30 April 2017

| Rank | No. | Nat. | Po. | Name | League One | FA Cup | EFL Cup | EFL Trophy | Total |
|---|---|---|---|---|---|---|---|---|---|
| 1 | 10 | (England) | CF | Billy Sharp | 30 | 0 | 0 | 0 | 30 |
| 2 | 18 | (Wales) | RB | Kieron Freeman | 10 | 1 | 0 | 0 | 11 |
| 3 | 27 | (England) | CF | Leon Clarke | 7 | 1 | 0 | 1 | 9 |
| 4 | 5 | (England) | CB | Jack O'Connell | 4 | 1 | 0 | 1 | 6 |
| 4 | 21 | (England) | RM | Mark Duffy | 6 | 0 | 0 | 0 | 6 |
| 6 | 8 | (Scotland) | CM | Stefan Scougall | 4 | 1 | 0 | 0 | 5 |
| 6 | 19 | (England) | CB | Ethan Ebanks-Landell | 5 | 0 | 0 | 0 | 5 |
| 8 | 9 | (Northern Ireland) | CF | Caolan Lavery | 4 | 0 | 0 | 0 | 4 |
| 8 | 24 | (Northern Ireland) | LB | Danny Lafferty | 4 | 0 | 0 | 0 | 4 |
| 8 | 32 | (England) | RW | Harry Chapman | 1 | 3 | 0 | 0 | 4 |
| 11 | 4 | (Scotland) | CM | John Fleck | 3 | 0 | 0 | 0 | 3 |
| 11 | 6 | (England) | DM | Chris Basham | 2 | 1 | 0 | 0 | 3 |
| 11 | 11 | (England) | CF | Matt Done | 3 | 0 | 0 | 0 | 3 |
| 11 | 15 | (Scotland) | CM | Paul Coutts | 2 | 0 | 0 | 1 | 3 |
| 11 | 26 | (Republic of Ireland) | AM | Jay O'Shea | 3 | 0 | 0 | 0 | 3 |
| 16 | 16 | (England) | CF | James Hanson | 1 | 0 | 0 | 0 | 1 |
| 16 | 20 | (Wales) | CB | James Wilson | 1 | 0 | 0 | 0 | 1 |
| 16 | 38 | (England) | MF | Regan Slater | 0 | 0 | 0 | 1 | 1 |
| Total | | | | | 87 | 8 | 1 | 4 | 99 |

==== Disciplinary record ====
As of 30 April 2017

| Rank | No. | Nat. | Po. | Name | League One | | | FA Cup | | | EFL Cup | | | EFL Trophy | | | Total | | |
| Rank | No. | Nat. | Po. | Name | Yellow card | (yellow card) (yellow-red card) | Red card | Yellow card | (yellow card) (yellow-red card) | Red card | Yellow card | (yellow card) (yellow-red card) | Red card | Yellow card | (yellow card) (yellow-red card) | Red card | Yellow card | (yellow card) (yellow-red card) | Red card |
|---|---|---|---|---|---|---|---|---|---|---|---|---|---|---|---|---|---|---|---|
| 1 | 4 | (Scotland) | CM | John Fleck | 10 | 0 | 0 | 0 | 0 | 0 | 0 | 0 | 0 | 0 | 0 | 0 | 10 | 0 | 0 |
| 2 | 15 | (Scotland) | CM | Paul Coutts | 9 | 0 | 0 | 0 | 0 | 0 | 0 | 0 | 0 | 0 | 0 | 0 | 9 | 0 | 0 |
| 3 | 6 | (England) | DM | Chris Basham | 5 | 0 | 1 | 0 | 0 | 0 | 0 | 0 | 0 | 1 | 0 | 0 | 6 | 0 | 1 |
| 3 | 10 | (England) | CF | Billy Sharp | 7 | 0 | 0 | 0 | 0 | 0 | 0 | 0 | 0 | 0 | 0 | 0 | 7 | 0 | 0 |
| 3 | 18 | (Wales) | RB | Kieron Freeman | 7 | 0 | 0 | 0 | 0 | 0 | 0 | 0 | 0 | 0 | 0 | 0 | 7 | 0 | 0 |
| 6 | 11 | (England) | CF | Matt Done | 6 | 0 | 0 | 0 | 0 | 0 | 0 | 0 | 0 | 0 | 0 | 0 | 6 | 0 | 0 |
| 6 | 13 | (England) | CB | Jake Wright | 6 | 0 | 0 | 0 | 0 | 0 | 0 | 0 | 0 | 0 | 0 | 0 | 6 | 0 | 0 |
| 8 | 19 | (England) | CB | Ethan Ebanks-Landell | 5 | 0 | 0 | 0 | 0 | 0 | 0 | 0 | 0 | 0 | 0 | 0 | 5 | 0 | 0 |
| 9 | 21 | (England) | RM | Mark Duffy | 3 | 0 | 0 | 0 | 0 | 0 | 0 | 0 | 0 | 1 | 0 | 0 | 4 | 0 | 0 |
| 9 | 27 | (England) | CF | Leon Clarke | 3 | 0 | 0 | 1 | 0 | 0 | 0 | 0 | 0 | 0 | 0 | 0 | 4 | 0 | 0 |
| 11 | 5 | (England) | CB | Jack O'Connell | 2 | 0 | 0 | 0 | 0 | 0 | 1 | 0 | 0 | 0 | 0 | 0 | 3 | 0 | 0 |
| 11 | 24 | (Northern Ireland) | LB | Danny Lafferty | 3 | 0 | 0 | 0 | 0 | 0 | 0 | 0 | 0 | 0 | 0 | 0 | 3 | 0 | 0 |
| 14 | 9 | (Northern Ireland) | CF | Caolan Lavery | 1 | 0 | 0 | 1 | 0 | 0 | 0 | 0 | 0 | 0 | 0 | 0 | 2 | 0 | 0 |
| 15 | ~~9~~ | (England) | CF | Che Adams | 1 | 0 | 0 | 0 | 0 | 0 | 0 | 0 | 0 | 0 | 0 | 0 | 1 | 0 | 0 |
| 15 | 25 | (England) | GK | Simon Moore | 1 | 0 | 0 | 0 | 0 | 0 | 0 | 0 | 0 | 0 | 0 | 0 | 1 | 0 | 0 |
| 15 | 36 | (England) | CM | David Brooks | 0 | 0 | 0 | 0 | 0 | 0 | 0 | 0 | 0 | 1 | 0 | 0 | 1 | 0 | 0 |
| 15 | 38 | (England) | MF | Regan Slater | 0 | 0 | 0 | 0 | 0 | 0 | 0 | 0 | 0 | 1 | 0 | 0 | 1 | 0 | 0 |
| 15 | 44 | (Republic of Ireland) | CM | Samir Carruthers | 1 | 0 | 0 | 0 | 0 | 0 | 0 | 0 | 0 | 0 | 0 | 0 | 1 | 0 | 0 |
| Total | | | | | 69 | 0 | 1 | 2 | 0 | 0 | 1 | 0 | 0 | 4 | 0 | 0 | 76 | 0 | 1 |

== Transfers ==
=== Transfers in ===
| Date from | Position | Nationality | Name | From | Fee | Ref. |
|---|---|---|---|---|---|---|
| 1 July 2016 | RM | (England) | Mark Duffy | Birmingham City | Free transfer | |
| 1 July 2016 | LB | (England) | Chris Hussey | Bury | Undisclosed | |
| 5 July 2016 | CB | (Wales) | James Wilson | Oldham Athletic | Free transfer | |
| 8 July 2016 | CM | (Scotland) | John Fleck | Coventry City | Free transfer | |
| 8 July 2016 | CB | (England) | Jack O'Connell | Brentford | Undisclosed | |
| 9 July 2016 | CB | (England) | Jake Wright | Oxford United | Free transfer | |
| 27 July 2016 | CF | (England) | Leon Clarke | Bury | Undisclosed | |
| 19 August 2016 | GK | (England) | Simon Moore | Cardiff City | Undisclosed | |
| 30 August 2016 | CF | (Northern Ireland) | Caolan Lavery | Sheffield Wednesday | Undisclosed | |
| 23 September 2016 | CB | (England) | Reece Brown | Bury | Free transfer | |
| 3 January 2017 | CM | (Republic of Ireland) | Samir Carruthers | Milton Keynes Dons | Undisclosed | |
| 13 January 2017 | LB | (Northern Ireland) | Daniel Lafferty | Burnley | Undisclosed | |
| 24 January 2017 | CF | (England) | James Hanson | Bradford City | Undisclosed | |

=== Transfers out ===
| Date from | Position | Nationality | Name | To | Fee | Ref. |
|---|---|---|---|---|---|---|
| 1 July 2016 | AM | (England) | Jose Baxter | Free agent | Released | |
| 1 July 2016 | RW | (Jamaica) | Jamal Campbell-Ryce | Barnet | Released | (Note: Following Campbell-Ryce's release, he signed for Barnet.) |
| 1 July 2016 | CM | (Belgium) | Florent Cuvelier | Walsall | Released | (Note: Following Cuvelier's release, he signed for Walsall.) |
| 1 July 2016 | CB | (Wales) | Ioan Evans | Gainsborough Trinity | Free transfer | |
| 1 July 2016 | RW | (Scotland) | Ryan Flynn | Oldham Athletic | Released | (Note: Following Flynn's release, he signed for Oldham Athletic.) |
| 1 July 2016 | CM | (England) | CJ Hamilton | Mansfield Town | Free transfer | |
| 1 July 2016 | LB | (Scotland) | Bob Harris | Bristol Rovers | Released | (Note: Following Bob Harris' release, he signed for Bristol Rovers.) |
| 1 July 2016 | GK | (England) | Mark Howard | Bolton Wanderers | Released | (Note: Following Howard's release, he signed for Bolton Wanderers.) |
| 1 July 2016 | CB | (England) | Terry Kennedy | Alfreton Town | Released | (Note: Following Kennedy's release, he signed for Alfreton Town.) |
| 1 July 2016 | CB | (Scotland) | Jay McEveley | Ross County | Released | (Note: Following McEveley's release, he signed for Ross County.) |
| 1 July 2016 | LB | (Scotland) | Callum McFadzean | Kilmarnock | Released | (Note: Following McFadzean's release, he signed for Kilmarnock.) |
| 1 July 2016 | CB | (England) | Harrison McGahey | Rochdale | Released | (Note: Following McGahey's release, he signed for Rochdale.) |
| 1 July 2016 | GK | (England) | George Willis | Stalybridge Celtic | Free transfer | |
| 2 July 2016 | CM | (England) | Dean Hammond | Free agent | Mutual consent | |
| 4 July 2016 | CF | (Northern Ireland) | Jamie McDonagh | Greenock Morton | Free transfer | |
| 7 July 2016 | SS | (Italy) | Diego De Girolamo | Bristol City | Free transfer | |
| 15 July 2016 | AM | (Republic of Ireland) | Joel Coustrain | Raith Rovers | Free transfer | |
| 8 August 2016 | CF | (England) | Che Adams | Birmingham City | Undisclosed | |
| 19 August 2016 | LW | (England) | Martyn Woolford | Fleetwood Town | Free transfer | |
| 31 August 2016 | CF | (England) | Dominic Calvert-Lewin | Everton | Undisclosed | |
| 6 January 2017 | CB | (England) | Reece Brown | Bury | Released | (Note: Following Brown's release, he signed for Bury.) |
| 31 January 2017 | GK | (England) | Aaron Ramsdale | AFC Bournemouth | Undisclosed | |

=== Loans in ===
| Date from | Position | Nationality | Name | From | Date until | Ref. |
|---|---|---|---|---|---|---|
| 12 August 2016 | RW | (England) | Harry Chapman | Middlesbrough | End of Season | |
| 31 August 2016 | CB | (England) | Ethan Ebanks-Landell | Wolverhampton Wanderers | End of Season | |
| 31 August 2016 | LB | (Northern Ireland) | Daniel Lafferty | Burnley | 13 January 2017 (Note: On 13 January 2017, Daniel Lafferty joined permanently.) | |
| 17 January 2017 | LB | (England) | Joe Riley | Manchester United | End of Season | |
| 24 January 2017 | AM | (Republic of Ireland) | Jay O'Shea | Chesterfield | End of Season | |

=== Loans out ===
| Date from | Position | Nationality | Name | To | Date until | Ref. |
|---|---|---|---|---|---|---|
| 16 August 2016 | CF | (England) | Jake Wright | York City | 14 September 2016 | |
| 19 August 2016 | RB | (England) | John Brayford | Burton Albion | End of Season | |
| 31 August 2016 | CF | (Scotland) | Marc McNulty | Bradford City | 2 January 2017 (Note: On 2 January 2017, Marc McNulty was recalled from his loan spell at Bradford City.) | |
| 31 August 2016 | LB | (England) | Kieran Wallace | Fleetwood Town | End of Season | |
| 1 January 2017 | CM | (England) | Benjamin Whiteman | Mansfield Town | End of Season | |
| 5 January 2017 | CF | (England) | Connor Hall | Woking | 11 March 2017 (Note: On 7 February 2017, Hall's loan was extended until 11 March 2017.) | |

== Competitions ==
=== Pre-season friendlies ===
| 9 July 2016 Friendly | Stocksbridge Park Steels | 0–5 | Sheffield United | Stocksbridge |
| 15:00 BST | | Report | McNulty; Done; Adams | Stadium: Bracken Moor; Attendance: 1,665 |

| 19 July 2016 Friendly | FC Halifax Town | 2–0 | Sheffield United | Halifax |
| 19:45 BST | Hughes 70'; Peniket 75' | Report | | Stadium: The Shay; Attendance: 1,363 |

| 23 July 2016 Friendly | Grimsby Town | 1–3 | Sheffield United | Cleethorpes |
| 15:00 BST | Summerfield 54' | Report | Calvert-Lewin 23'; Sharp 25' 60' | Stadium: Blundell Park |

| 26 July 2016 Friendly | Hallam | 0–1 | Sheffield United | Crosspool |
| 19:45 BST | | Report | | Stadium: Sandygate Road |

| 27 July 2016 Friendly | Sheffield United | 0–1 | Derby County | Sheffield |
| 19:45 BST | | Report | Blackman 32' (pen.) | Stadium: Bramall Lane |

| 29 July 2016 Friendly | Handsworth Parramore | 1–5 | Sheffield United | Handsworth |
| 19:45 BST | | Report | | Stadium: Sandy Lane |

=== EFL League One ===
==== League table ====
| Pos | Team | Pld | W | D | L | GF | GA | GD | Pts | Promotion, qualification or relegation |
|---|---|---|---|---|---|---|---|---|---|---|
| 1 | Sheffield United (C, P) | 46 | 30 | 10 | 6 | 92 | 47 | +45 | 100 | Promotion to the EFL Championship |
| 2 | Bolton Wanderers (P) | 46 | 25 | 11 | 10 | 68 | 36 | +32 | 86 | Promotion to the EFL Championship |
| 3 | Scunthorpe United | 46 | 24 | 10 | 12 | 80 | 54 | +26 | 82 | Qualification for the League One play-offs (Note: Four teams play for one spot and promotion to the EFL Championship.) |
| 4 | Fleetwood Town | 46 | 23 | 13 | 10 | 64 | 43 | +21 | 82 | Qualification for the League One play-offs |
| 5 | Bradford City | 46 | 20 | 19 | 7 | 62 | 43 | +19 | 79 | Qualification for the League One play-offs |

Source: BBC Sport
Rules for classification: 1) Points; 2) Goal difference; 3) Number of goals scored
(C) Champions; (P) Promoted

==== Matches ====
| Matchday | 1 | 2 | 3 | 4 | 5 | 6 | 7 | 8 | 9 | 10 | 11 | 12 | 13 | 14 | 15 | 16 | 17 | 18 | 19 | 20 | 21 | 22 | 23 | 24 | 25 | 26 | 27 | 28 | 29 | 30 | 31 | 32 | 33 | 34 | 35 | 36 | 37 | 38 | 39 | 40 | 41 | 42 | 43 | 44 | 45 | 46 |
|---|---|---|---|---|---|---|---|---|---|---|---|---|---|---|---|---|---|---|---|---|---|---|---|---|---|---|---|---|---|---|---|---|---|---|---|---|---|---|---|---|---|---|---|---|---|---|
| Ground | A | H | H | A | H | A | A | H | A | H | A | H | A | A | H | A | H | H | A | H | H | A | H | H | A | A | A | H | H | H | A | A | H | H | A | A | A | H | A | H | H | A | A | H | A | H |
| Result | L | D | L | L | W | W | W | W | D | W | D | W | W | D | W | W | W | W | D | L | W | W | W | W | W | W | L | D | L | W | W | D | D | W | D | W | W | W | D | W | W | W | W | W | W | W |
| Position | 18 | 18 | 22 | 24 | 20 | 18 | 13 | 6 | 7 | 6 | 4 | 5 | 4 | 5 | 4 | 3 | 2 | 2 | 3 | 3 | 3 | 2 | 2 | 1 | 1 | 1 | 1 | 1 | 1 | 1 | 1 | 1 | 1 | 1 | 1 | 1 | 1 | 1 | 1 | 1 | 1 | 1 | 1 | 1 | 1 | 1 |

Source: WorldFootball.com
A = Away; H = Home; W = Win; D = Draw; L = Loss

| 6 August 2016 1 | Bolton Wanderers | 1–0 | Sheffield United | Bolton |
| 15:00 BST | Vela (yellow card) 28'; Spearing 37' (yellow card) 45+1' | Report | Clarke (yellow card) 39'; Adams (yellow card) 90' | Stadium: Macron Stadium; Attendance: 17,050; Referee: Ross Joyce |

| 13 August 2016 2 | Sheffield United | 1–1 | Rochdale | Sheffield |
| 15:00 BST | Fleck (yellow card) 23'; Sharp 81' | Report | McDermott (yellow card) 35'; Cannon 43' | Stadium: Bramall Lane; Attendance: 19,399; Referee: Kevin Johnson |

| 16 August 2016 3 | Sheffield United | 0–3 | Southend United | Sheffield |
| 19:45 BST | Sharp (yellow card) 59' | Report | O'Connell 5' (o.g.); McLaughlin 13'; Cox 15'; Thompson (yellow card) 40'; Coker (yellow card) 59' | Stadium: Bramall Lane; Attendance: 17,410; Referee: Geoff Eltringham |

| 20 August 2016 4 | Millwall | 2–1 | Sheffield United | South Bermondsey |
| 15:00 BST | Williams 14'; Morison 89' (pen.) | Report | Scougall 21'; O'Connell (yellow card) 88' | Stadium: The Den; Attendance: 9,058; Referee: Andy Woolmer |

| 27 August 2016 5 | Sheffield United | 2–1 | Oxford United | Sheffield |
| 15:00 BST | Basham (yellow card) 1'; Wright (yellow card) 16'; Freeman (yellow card) 52'; Sharp 65'; Wilson 73' | Report | Hemmings 16' (yellow card) 60'; Ruffels (yellow card) 73' | Stadium: Bramall Lane; Attendance: 19,313; Referee: Nicholas Kinsley |

| 4 September 2016 6 | Gillingham | 1–2 | Sheffield United | Gillingham |
| 14:15 BST | Dack 34'; Oshilaja (yellow card) 46'; Pask (yellow card) 90' | Report | Done (yellow card) 14'; Lafferty (yellow card) 32'; Freeman 65'; Sharp 90+1' (pen.) | Stadium: Priestfield Stadium; Attendance: 5,598; Referee: Darren Handley |

| 10 September 2016 7 | AFC Wimbledon | 2–3 | Sheffield United | Kingston upon Thames |
| 15:00 BST | Poleon 37'; Fuller (yellow card) 40'; Elliott 72' | Report | Sharp (yellow card) 16' (goal) 26'; Duffy 20'; Done 60' | Stadium: Kingsmeadow Stadium; Attendance: 4,810; Referee: Graham Salisbury |

| 17 September 2016 8 | Sheffield United | 1–0 | Peterborough United | Sheffield |
| 15:00 BST | Done 13'; Sharp (yellow card) 62'; Basham (yellow card) 67'; Coutts (yellow card) 78'; Ebanks-Landell (yellow card) 90+1' | Report | Moncur (yellow card) 74'; Smith (yellow card) 90+3' | Stadium: Bramall Lane; Attendance: 19,555; Referee: Neil Swarbrick |

| 24 September 2016 9 | Scunthorpe United | 2–2 | Sheffield United | Scunthorpe |
| 15:00 BST | Clarke (yellow card) 33' van Veen (yellow card) 44'; Morris 55'; Wallace (yellow card) 62'; Holmes 82'; Mirfin (yellow card) 85' | Report | Ebanks-Landell (yellow card) 14'; Basham 34' (red card) 69'; Done (yellow card) 42'; Sharp 85' (pen.) | Stadium: Glanford Park; Attendance: 6,243; Referee: Darren Deadman |

| 27 September 2016 10 | Sheffield United | 1–0 | Bristol Rovers | Sheffield |
| 19:45 BST | Coutts (yellow card) 37'; Chapman 65'; Lavery (yellow card) 90+3' | Report | Boateng (yellow card) 30'; Easter (red card) 66'; Leadbitter (yellow card) 90+2' | Stadium: Bramall Lane; Attendance: 19,196; Referee: Chris Sarginson |

| 1 October 2016 11 | Fleetwood Town | 1–1 | Sheffield United | Fleetwood |
| 15:00 BST | Ball 13'; McLaughlin (yellow card) 18'; Long (yellow card) 34'; Neal (yellow card) 58'; Jónsson (yellow card) 79'; Hunter (yellow card) 83' | Report | Ebanks-Landell 90+5' (yellow card) 90+6' | Stadium: Highbury Stadium; Attendance: 4,004; Referee: Andy Haines |

| 15 October 2016 12 | Sheffield United | 4–0 | Port Vale | Sheffield |
| 15:00 BST | Ebanks-Landell 23', 45'; Duffy 62'; Scougall 83' | Report | Hart (yellow card) 85' | Stadium: Bramall Lane; Attendance: 19,699; Referee: Mark Heywood |

| 18 October 2016 13 | Shrewsbury Town | 0–3 | Sheffield United | Shrewsbury |
| 19:45 BST | | | Sharp 46', 66'; Lafferty 63' | Stadium: Greenhous Meadow; Referee: David Webb |

| 22 October 2016 14 | Bradford City | 3–3 | Sheffield United | Bradford |
| 15:00 BST | Clarke 35'; Hiwula-Mayifuila 60'; Dieng 68' | Report | Sharp 18', 51'; Basham (yellow card) 26' (goal) 72'; Duffy (yellow card) 28'; Done (yellow card) 45+1'; Wright (yellow card) 77' | Stadium: Coral Windows Stadium; Attendance: 20,972; Referee: Jon Moss |

| 29 October 2016 15 | Sheffield United | 2–1 | Milton Keynes Dons | Sheffield |
| 15:00 BST | Scougall 5'; Freeman (yellow card) 31'; Sharp 63'; Coutts (yellow card) 81' | Report | Hendry (yellow card) 40'; Baldock (yellow card) 45+3'; Potter 49' (yellow card) 87'; Walsh (yellow card) 70' | Stadium: Bramall Lane; Attendance: 20,495; Referee: Simon Hooper |

| 13 November 2016 16 | Chesterfield | 1–4 | Sheffield United | Chesterfield |
| 14:15 GMT | Nolan 2' | Report | Freeman 54' (yellow card) 54'; Fleck 72'; Sharp 73'; Clarke 81' | Stadium: Proact Stadium; Attendance: 8,451; Referee: Chris Sarginson |

| 19 November 2016 17 | Sheffield United | 2–1 | Shrewsbury Town | Sheffield |
| 15:00 GMT | Sharp 8' (penalty missed) 21'; Scougall 24'; Lafferty (yellow card) 88' | Report | O'Brien (red card) 20'; Ogogo (red card) 45+4'; Deegan (yellow card) 52'; Dodds 72' | Stadium: Bramall Lane; Attendance: 20,195; Referee: Darren Deadman |

| 22 November 2016 18 | Sheffield United | 1–0 | Bury | Sheffield |
| 19:45 GMT | O'Connell (yellow card) 85'; Ebanks-Landell 90+3' | Report | Mellis (red card) 43'; Pope (yellow card) 44'; Williams (yellow card) 62'; Leigh (yellow card) 80' (yellow-red card) 85' | Stadium: Bramall Lane; Attendance: 19,022; Referee: Ross Joyce |

| 26 November 2016 19 | Charlton Athletic | 1–1 | Sheffield United | Charlton, London |
| 15:00 GMT | Fox (yellow card) 36'; Bauer 90+3' | Report | Duffy 32'; Clarke (yellow card) 66'; Coutts (yellow card) 84'; Lafferty (yellow card) 90+2' | Stadium: The Valley; Attendance: 12,580; Referee: Graham Scott |

| 29 November 2016 20 | Sheffield United | 0–1 | Walsall | Sheffield |
| 19:45 GMT | | Report | Bakayoko 42'; Preston (yellow card) 62'; Laird (yellow card) 86' | Stadium: Bramall Lane; Attendance: 18,343; Referee: Darren England |

| 10 December 2016 21 | Sheffield United | 4–0 | Swindon Town | Sheffield |
| 15:00 GMT | Freeman (yellow card) 7'; Duffy 52', 60'; Coutts 54' (yellow card) 67'; Lavery 77' | Report | Branco (yellow card) 83' | Stadium: Bramall Lane; Attendance: 19,196; Referee: Gavin Ward |

| 15 December 2016 22 | Coventry City | 1–2 | Sheffield United | Coventry |
| 19:45 GMT | Agyei 51'; Turnbull (yellow card) 82'; Sordell (yellow card) 90' | Report | Sharp 23', 87' | Stadium: Ricoh Arena; Attendance: 8,801; Referee: David Webb |

| 26 December 2016 23 | Sheffield United | 2–0 | Oldham Athletic | Sheffield |
| 15:00 GMT | Ebanks-Landell (yellow card) 70'; Sharp 72', 88' | Report | Flynn (yellow card) 26'; Osei (yellow card) 57'; Dummigan (yellow card) 65' | Stadium: Bramall Lane; Attendance: 25,821; Referee: Mark Heywood |

| 31 December 2016 24 | Sheffield United | 1–0 | Northampton Town | Sheffield |
| 13:00 GMT | Ebanks-Landell (yellow card) 34'; Freeman 89' | Report | | Stadium: Bramall Lane; Attendance: 24,194; Referee: Darren Drysdale |

| 2 January 2017 25 | Bury | 1–3 | Sheffield United | Bury |
| 15:00 GMT | Mellis 12'; Etuhu (yellow card) 35'; Kay (yellow card) 52'; Vaughan (yellow card) 54'; Soares (yellow card) 62' | Report | Sharp 21'; Etuhu 72' (o.g.); Freeman 81'; Wright (yellow card) 84' | Stadium: Gigg Lane; Attendance: 6,123; Referee: Rob Lewis |

| 7 January 2017 26 | Southend United | 2–4 | Sheffield United | Southend-on-Sea |
| 15:00 GMT | Cox 19' (yellow card) 45+1'; Atkinson (yellow card) 54'; McGlashan 88' | Report | Ebanks-Landell 3'; O'Connell 42'; Freeman (yellow card) 51' (goal) 76'; Basham (yellow card) 67'; Lavery 72' | Stadium: Roots Hall Stadium; Attendance: 7,702; Referee: Andrew Davies |

| 14 January 2017 27 | Walsall | 4–1 | Sheffield United | Walsall |
| 15:00 GMT | Bakayoko 5' (yellow card) 61'; McCarthy (yellow card) 44' (goal) 58'; Edwards 67'; Oztumer 76' (pen.) | Report | O'Connell 10'; Done (yellow card) 33'; Fleck (yellow card) 87' | Stadium: The Banks's Stadium; Attendance: 6,899; Referee: Richard Clark |

| 21 January 2017 28 | Sheffield United | 2–2 | Gillingham | Sheffield |
| 15:00 GMT | Sharp 32'; Freeman 61'; Duffy (yellow card) 81' | Report | Wright 51', 58' (yellow card) 55'; Oshilaja (yellow card) 59' | Stadium: Bramall Lane; Attendance: 20,649; Referee: Ben Toner |

| 24 January 2017 29 | Sheffield United | 0–2 | Fleetwood Town | Sheffield |
| 19:45 GMT | | Report | McLaughlin 20'; Schwabl (yellow card) 25'; Cole (yellow card) 66' (goal) 67' | Stadium: Bramall Lane; Attendance: 19,012; Referee: Rob Jones |

| 4 February 2017 30 | Sheffield United | 4–0 | AFC Wimbledon | Sheffield |
| 15:00 GMT | Sharp 2'; Hanson 37'; Fleck 79'; Lavery 90+1' | Report | | Stadium: Bramall Lane; Attendance: 20,549; Referee: David Webb |

| 11 February 2017 31 | Peterborough United | 0–1 | Sheffield United | Peterborough |
| 15:00 GMT | Edwards (yellow card) 38'; Nichols (yellow card) 40' | Report | Carruthers (yellow card) 43'; Sharp (yellow card) 74' (goal) 87' | Stadium: ABAX Stadium; Attendance: 10,258; Referee: Andy Haines |

| 14 February 2017 32 | Bristol Rovers | 0–0 | Sheffield United | Bristol |
| 19:45 GMT | | Report | Wright (yellow card) 69' | Stadium: Memorial Stadium; Attendance: 9,175; Referee: Kevin Johnson |

| 18 February 2017 33 | Sheffield United | 1–1 | Scunthorpe United | Sheffield |
| 15:00 GMT | Sharp 49' (yellow card) 87'; Coutts (yellow card) 58'; Duffy (yellow card) 77'; Fleck (yellow card) 90+7' | Report | Toffolo (yellow card) 10' (yellow-red card) 51' van Veen (yellow card) 35'; Madden 47'; Bishop (yellow card) 59'; Dawson (yellow card) 88' | Stadium: Bramall Lane; Attendance: 27,980; Referee: Mike Jones |

| 25 February 2017 34 | Sheffield United | 2–0 | Bolton Wanderers | Sheffield |
| 15:00 GMT | Sharp 12', 70' (pen.); Fleck (yellow card) 33' | Report | Wilkinson (yellow card) 51'; Wheater (yellow card) 69'; Osede (yellow card) 79' | Stadium: Bramall Lane; Attendance: 27,165; Referee: Mike Dean |

| 4 March 2017 35 | Rochdale | 3–3 | Sheffield United | Rochdale |
| 15:00 GMT | Cannon (yellow card) 10'; Davies 20'; Lund 46' (yellow card) 71'; Mendez-Laing 78' | Report | Duffy 5'; Lafferty 11'; Coutts (yellow card) 41'; Sharp 68' | Stadium: Spotland Stadium; Attendance: 6,214; Referee: Seb Stockbridge |

| 7 March 2017 36 | Oxford United | 2–3 | Sheffield United | Oxford |
| 19:45 GMT | Dunkley 22'; Ledson (yellow card) 37'; Nelson (yellow card) 76'; Martínez 90+2' | Report | Wright (yellow card) 16'; Sharp 55', 76' (pen.) (yellow card) 81'; Freeman 72'; Coutts (yellow card) 74' | Stadium: Kassam Stadium; Attendance: 8,965; Referee: Paul Tierney |

| 14 March 2017 37 | Swindon Town | 2–4 | Sheffield United | Swindon |
| 19:45 GMT | Colkett 46'; Gladwin 53' | Report | Lavery 29'; Freeman 35'; O'Shea 58'; Basham (yellow card) 61'; Coutts 90+2' (pen.) | Stadium: County Ground; Attendance: 7,012; Referee: Oliver Langford |

| 18 March 2017 38 | Sheffield United | 2–1 | Charlton Athletic | Sheffield |
| 15:00 GMT | O'Connell 14'; Lafferty 48' | Report | Holmes 3' | Stadium: Bramall Lane; Attendance: 23,308; Referee: Scott Duncan |

| 25 March 2017 39 | Oldham Athletic | 1–1 | Sheffield United | Oldham |
| 15:00 GMT | Fané (yellow card) 42'; Obadeyi 44' | Report | Basham (yellow card) 21'; O'Shea 50'; Freeman (yellow card) 71' | Stadium: Boundary Park; Attendance: 8,448; Referee: Eddie Ilderton |

| 28 March 2017 40 | Sheffield United | 2–0 | Millwall | Sheffield |
| 19:45 BST | O'Connell 16'; Wright (yellow card) 31'; Freeman 55'; Fleck (yellow card) 90' | Report | Thompson (yellow card) 45+2'; O'Brien (yellow card) 90+3' | Stadium: Bramall Lane; Attendance: 20,832; Referee: Jeremy Simpson |

| 5 April 2017 41 | Sheffield United | 2–0 | Coventry City | Sheffield |
| 20:00 BST | Clarke 70'; Fleck 75' | Report | Bigirimana (yellow card) 36' | Stadium: Bramall Lane; Attendance: 24,334; Referee: Ross Joyce |

| 8 April 2017 42 | Northampton Town | 1–2 | Sheffield United | Northampton |
| 15:00 BST | Richards 45+1' | Report | Lafferty (yellow card) 23'; Clarke 61'; Fleck (yellow card) 79' (goal) 88' | Stadium: Sixfields Stadium; Attendance: 7,425; Referee: Mark Heywood |

| 14 April 2017 43 | Port Vale | 0–3 | Sheffield United | Burslem |
| 15:00 BST | | Report | O'Shea 2'; Clarke 30'; Done (yellow card) 51' (goal) 90+3' | Stadium: Vale Park; Attendance: 8,999; Referee: Nick Kinseley |

| 17 April 2017 44 | Sheffield United | 3–0 | Bradford City | Sheffield |
| 12:15 BST | Clarke 13', 42' (yellow card) 79'; Sharp 20'; Fleck (yellow card) 21'; Wright (yellow card) 35'; Coutts (yellow card) 58' | Report | Vincelot (yellow card) 68' | Stadium: Bramall Lane; Attendance: 26,838; Referee: Paul Tierney |

| 22 April 2017 45 | Milton Keynes Dons | 0–3 | Sheffield United | Milton Keynes |
| 15:00 BST | Potter (yellow card) 27' | Report | Clarke 45+2'; Sharp 67', 81' | Stadium: Stadium:MK; Attendance: 18,180; Referee: John Brooks |

| 30 April 2017 46 | Sheffield United | 3–2 | Chesterfield | Sheffield |
| 12:00 BST | Freeman 18' (yellow card) 20'; Moore (yellow card) 45'; Sharp 59' (yellow card) 67'; Lafferty 82'; Fleck (yellow card) 90+2' | Report | Mitchell (yellow card) 9'; Dennis 45' (pen.); McGinn 65'; Gardner (red card) 66' | Stadium: Bramall Lane; Attendance: 31,003; Referee: John Busby |

=== FA Cup ===
| 6 November 2016 First round | Sheffield United | 6–0 | Leyton Orient | Sheffield |
| 14:00 GMT | Basham 22'; Scougall 39'; Freeman 45'; Chapman 54', 69', 90+2' | Report | Massey (yellow card) 74' | Stadium: Bramall Lane; Attendance: 6,099; Referee: Nigel Miller |

| 4 December 2016 Second round | Bolton Wanderers | 3–2 | Sheffield United | Bolton |
| 14:00 GMT | Madine 44'; Sammy Ameobi 46'; Vela 84' | Report | Clarke (yellow card) 57'; Lavery (yellow card) 58'; Coutts 64'; O'Connell 86' | Stadium: Macron Stadium; Attendance: 7,027; Referee: Lee Probert |

=== EFL Cup ===
| 9 August 2016 First round | Sheffield United | 1–2 (a.e.t.) | Crewe Alexandra | Sheffield |
| 19:45 BST | Clarke 6'; O'Connell (yellow card) 65' | Report | Lowe 89', 100' | Stadium: Bramall Lane; Attendance: 8,305; Referee: James Adcock |

=== EFL Trophy ===
| Pos | Div | Team | Pld | W | PW | PL | L | GF | GA | GD | Pts | Qualification |
|---|---|---|---|---|---|---|---|---|---|---|---|---|
| 1 | L1 | Walsall | 3 | 3 | 0 | 0 | 0 | 8 | 3 | +5 | 9 | Advance to Round 2 |
| 2 | ACA | Leicester City U21 | 3 | 1 | 1 | 0 | 1 | 1 | 1 | 0 | 5 | Advance to Round 2 |
| 3 | L1 | Sheffield United | 3 | 1 | 0 | 1 | 1 | 5 | 4 | +1 | 4 | |
| 4 | L2 | Grimsby Town | 3 | 0 | 0 | 0 | 3 | 4 | 10 | −6 | 0 | |

Source: Sky Sports

| 30 August 2016 Group stage 1 | Sheffield United | 0–0 (4–5 p) | Leicester City U23 | Sheffield |
| 19:45 BST | Brooks (yellow card) 72' | | | Stadium: Bramall Lane; Attendance: 3,632; Referee: Nigel Miller |
| | Penalties |
| | Coutts (penalty scored); Fleck (penalty missed); Duffy (penalty scored); Chapman (penalty scored); O'Connell (penalty scored) | | Chilwell (penalty scored); Gray (penalty scored); Muskwe (penalty scored); Barnes (penalty scored); Ndukwu (penalty scored) |

| 4 October 2016 Group stage 2 | Sheffield United | 1–2 | Walsall | Sheffield |
| 19:45 BST | Duffy (yellow card) 45+1'; Coutts 78' | Report | Laird 16'; Toner (yellow card) 54'; Bakayoko 66'; Shorrock (yellow card) 90' | Stadium: Bramall Lane; Attendance: 2,619; Referee: Mark Heywood |

| 9 November 2016 Group stage 3 | Grimsby Town | 2–4 | Sheffield United | Cleethorpes |
| 19:45 GMT | Jackson 14'; Boyce (yellow card) 63'; Disley 81' | Report | Slater 53' (yellow card) 59'; Basham (yellow card) 60'; Boyce 74' (o.g.); O'Connell 78'; Clarke 87' | Stadium: Blundell Park; Attendance: 597; Referee: Richard Clark |
