= Stourbridge F.C. =

Association football club in England

Stourbridge
- Full name: Stourbridge Football Club
- Nickname: The Glassboys
- Founded: 1876; 150 years ago (as Stourbridge Standard)
- Ground: War Memorial Athletic Ground, Amblecote
- Capacity: 2,035
- Chairman: Andy Pountney
- Manager: Scott Adey-Linforth
- League: Southern League Premier Division Central
- 2024–25: Southern League Premier Division Central, 9th of 22
- Website: www.stourbridgefc.com
Home colours	Away colours	Third colours

Stourbridge Football Club (nicknamed "The Glassboys" due to the town's traditional association with the cut glass industry) is an English association football club based in the town of Stourbridge, West Midlands. The club currently plays in the Southern League Premier Division Central.

== History ==
=== Early years ===
The club was founded in 1876 and was originally known as Stourbridge Standard. By the late 1880s, it is known that they had changed its name to simply Stourbridge and competed in the Birmingham and District League, where reasonable success was achieved without actually gaining the league title, although the Worcestershire Senior Cup was won on three occasions.

The 1923–24 season was one of the best in the club's history, as they clinched the Birmingham League championship and also won the Worcestershire Senior Cup yet again.

After World War II, The Glassboys enjoyed their greatest period of success in non-league football, as they carried off the Birmingham Combination Championship in 1952 and also won the Birmingham, Worcestershire and Herefordshire Senior Cups. The club returned to the Birmingham League in 1954 on the disbanding of the Birmingham Combination and were runners-up in 1955–56. The Birmingham Senior Cup was won for a second time in 1958–59 and the 1967–68 season saw the club achieve their own "double" in lifting both the Worcestershire and Birmingham Senior Cups.

=== Into the Southern League ===
In 1971 the club was elected to the expanding Southern League and met almost instant success under manager Alan Grundy in the 1973–74 season, with the division 1 (North) title and the Merit Cup (for the league's highest goalscorers) coming to Amblecote. Twin strikers Ray Haywood and Chic Bates each notched 50 goals that season and were transferred to Shrewsbury Town, where Bates served 13 years as both player and manager. Another highlight in 1973–74 was a tremendous run in the Welsh Cup, in which the team disposed of both Swansea City and Wrexham on their own grounds and then faced Cardiff City in a two leg final. A record crowd of 5,726 saw the Glassboys lose the home leg 1–0 and they also lost 1–0 at Ninian Park.

Stourbridge spent ten seasons in the Premier Division of the Southern League between 1974 and 1984, two centre-forwards were also sold in the 70s, Steve Cooper to Torquay United and Tony Cunningham to Lincoln City. Finishing regularly in the top six and under the management of Tony Freely, they won the Worcestershire Senior Cup for the 9th time with a victory over close rivals Kidderminster Harriers in 1981 with the Stourbridge born Brendan Drummond getting the winning goal in the second leg away to the Harriers to win 2–1 on aggregate. Stourbridge were one of the first English semi-professional clubs to tour the South East of the US in the early Eighties.

Subsequent Midland Division form was mediocre too, despite three good FA Cup runs, and a disastrous run of results in 1987–88 led to a relegation spot, however fortune was on the club's side and they were re-elected to the League in the close season. Stourbridge then went on from strength to strength, culminating in winning the Midland Division championship in 1991, although Southern League officials refused promotion due to the shared use of the ground by the local cricket club.

October 1997 saw a new chairman at the club and his early enthusiasm in refurbishing the social club continued with many signings for the 1998–99 season under the guidance of new manager, Steve Daniels. The Glassboys spent much of the early part of the season in the top 3 whilst also reaching the FA Cup 4th qualifying round for the first time in 15 years, but the success was short lived as budget cutbacks saw many of the more experienced players moving on. In 2000 a new owner came to the club, and swiftly appointed Mark Serrell as chairman, along with FA Qualified coach and ex-Birmingham City player Mark Harrison as manager. Despite an influx of new players, continued poor results meant Stourbridge's 29-year spell at Southern League level ended with defeat in the last game of the season at Hinckley United in May 2000.

=== Re-grouping in the Midland Alliance ===
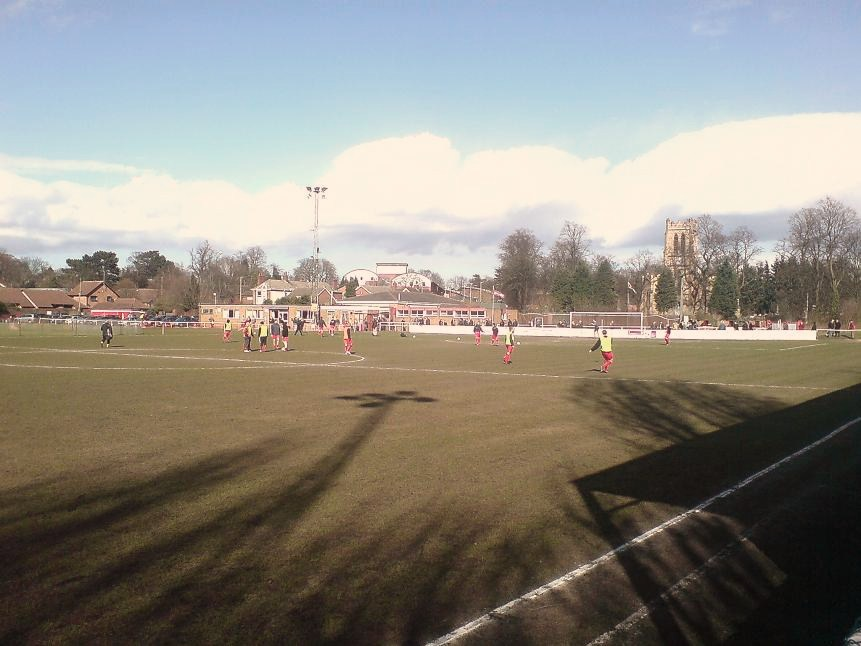
Clubhouse end of the ground

The club began its first ever spell in the Midland Football Alliance by finishing in fifth place and claiming the League Cup by defeating Bridgnorth Town following a dramatic penalty shoot-out after the final had finished in a 1–1 draw. The 2001–02 season began well with the lifting of the Joe McGorian Cup after a 2–1 victory at league champions Stourport Swifts, however in November 2001 the club parted company with Mark Harrison, with the former Bilston Town boss Joe Jackson taking over as manager. On the final Saturday of the season, the Glassboys were crowned champions in dramatic fashion as a last gasp stoppage time goal by Brian Gray earned the point needed at Stafford Town to pip Bromsgrove Rovers to the title. Although Serrell left the club the following January, to be succeeded as chairman by Stephen Hyde, Jackson once more led the club to the Midland Football Alliance championship in 2002–03, although promotion was refused due to the ground grading regulations in place at the time.

Jackson declined to try for a hat trick of titles in 2003–04 and was replaced by well-known local duo, Jon Ford and Gary Hackett, who had enjoyed two successful seasons in charge at Bromsgrove Rovers. With many players moving on, the new management team had to rebuild the side from scratch, but an encouraging second half of the season saw the Glassboys finish a creditable 9th. The following season saw a memorable run in the FA Vase, culminating in a quarter-final defeat at A.F.C. Sudbury in the quarter-final before finally succumbing to a 4–1 defeat after extra time. In May 2005 Hackett took sole charge of the team after Ford decided to step down due to work and family commitments. With the likely re-organisation of the non-league pyramid at Step 4 level, the club looked to mount a strong push for promotion, however a mixed start to the campaign left Stourbridge lying in mid-table by December. After a poor start, a run of 14 league games unbeaten was enough to clinch a runners-up spot and with it promotion back to the Southern League. Victories over Burton Albion and Moor Green also saw the team reach the Birmingham Senior Cup Final for the first time in 30 years, although they succumbed to a 1–0 defeat to Willenhall Town.

=== Back in the Southern League ===
Stourbridge's first season back in the Southern League Midlands Division in 2006–07 saw them finish in seventh place. The team also reached the final of the Worcestershire Senior Cup, but following a goal-less draw at Amblecote in the first leg of the final against Evesham United, they were beaten 2–1 after extra time away in the second leg to again suffer cup final disappointment.

The 2007–08 season saw Stourbridge seal a third-place finish in the Midlands Division to reach the play-offs. A narrow 1–0 win at home to Sutton Coldfield Town took Stourbridge through to the final away at second placed Leamington and in front of a crowd of 1,634, a goal from Leon Broadhurst four minutes from the end of extra-time sealed a 2–1 victory to earn Stourbridge a second promotion in three seasons and a return to the Premier Division of the Southern League after a gap of 24 years.

After a difficult start to life in the Premier Division which saw Stourbridge lie at and around the foot of the table, they eventually acclimatised to life at the higher level and secured another season in the Premier Division with a final placing of 16th. Stourbridge also reached their third senior cup final in four seasons in a Birmingham Senior Cup run which included a 4–3 home win after extra-time over Wolverhampton Wanderers and a semi-final victory on penalties at Tamworth after a goal-less 120 minutes. However Stourbridge once again suffered heartbreak in the final as Hednesford Town defeated the Glassboys 2–0 at Burton Albion's Pirelli Stadium.

In the 2009–10 season, Stourbridge reached the FA Cup first round for the first time in their 133-year history and were drawn at home to Walsall. The game ended in a 1–0 defeat for Stourbridge in front of 2,014 fans (the biggest gate at Amblecote for 35 years).

In the 2010–11 season, Hackett guided the club to eighth in the league after a solid season, and also the final of the Worcestershire Senior Cup, where they defeated Worcester City 2–0 at Aggborough Stadium. In the 2011–12 season, the club won their way through four qualifying rounds to again reach the first round of the FA Cup. They were drawn away to League Two side Plymouth Argyle where they drew 3–3 at Home Park to earn themselves a replay and a place in the second-round draw. The replay at the War Memorial Ground was chosen for live coverage by ESPN, netting the club over £33,000. Two temporary stands were erected and a highest crowd for 37 years of 2,519 attended the game that saw Stourbridge win 2–0 thanks to goals from Paul McCone and Sean Evans. The victory meant it was the first time the club had reached the second round of the competition, and the club were dealt a home tie against League One club Stevenage. The game ended 3–0 to Stevenage, with the game being played in front of 3,067 following the erection of a third temporary stand.

In the 2012–13 season, Stourbridge had excellent league form throughout the season and finished 2nd behind champions Leamington F.C., but there was heartbreak in the playoff semi-final when they lost to Gosport Borough 2–1 at home.

In the 2013–14 season, Stourbridge beat Biggleswade Town in the first round of the FA Cup. They were the lowest ranked team in the second round proper, where they were knocked out again by Stevenage. They produced a strong showing in the league, and although the heights of the previous season were not reached, 5th place was achieved and Stourbridge once again had a shot at promotion in the end of season playoffs. This time, Chesham United defeated The Glassboys 2–1 in the semi-final to again dash hopes of promotion.

During the close season, Stourbridge were moved across to the Northern Premier League from the 2014–15 season.

=== Into the Northern Premier League ===
It took time for Stourbridge to carry their solid form from the Southern League into the Northern Premier Division, finishing 16th in the 2014–15 season, being knocked out in early rounds of the FA Cup & FA Trophy.

In the 2015–16 season, Stourbridge again made their way through four qualifying rounds, to reach the first round proper of the FA Cup for the fourth time in seven seasons. Along the way they beat rivals Kidderminster Harriers 3–0 at home in the fourth qualifying round. In the first round of the FA cup they were drawn away to Dover Athletic, the game finished 2–1 in the Glassboys' favour. The second round draw gave them a home tie against Eastleigh, which Stourbridge lost 2–0. Stourbridge also reached the FA Trophy 3rd round for only the 3rd time in their history and the first time since 1972–73, only to be knocked out by league rivals Nantwich Town, with a late goal from Steve Jones doing the damage. Meanwhile, in the league, the Glassboys finished in 6th position, just one place away from the playoff positions.

In 2016–17, after beating Whitehawk in a FA Cup first round replay 3–0, Luke Benbow and Chris Lait sent the club into the second round of the FA Cup. Stourbridge defeated League One mid-table side Northampton Town to reach the third round for the first time in the club's history, thanks to a late goal by Jack Duggan. The third round draw resulted in Wycombe Wanderers hosting Stourbridge. Dan Scarr cancelled out Wycombe's opener on the 70 minute mark. Stourbridge gathered momentum with Tom Tonks' looping shot hitting the crossbar, but Wycombe's Adebayo Akinfenwa gave the League Two side a late winner. On 29 April, the team reached the divisional playoff final but eventually lost the game to Spennymoor Town 1–0. Stourbridge achieved the highest average home league attendance for the season of 839.

In May 2019, Hackett announced his resignation after sixteen years in charge following the club's defeat to Alvechurch in the play off semi final. He was succeeded by Alvechurch manager Ian Long, whose appointment was announced several weeks later. Several players followed Long to the War Memorial, whilst long-serving players such as Paul McCone and record appearance holder Leon Broadhurst moved on as part of a major shake up of the playing squad.

== Records ==
- Best FA Cup performance: Third round (2016–17), Second round (2011–12, 2013–14, 2015–16), First round (2009–10, 2019–20)
- Best FA Trophy performance: Quarter-finals (1970–71)
- Best FA Vase performance: Quarter-finals (2004–05)
- Best Welsh Cup performance: Runners-up (1973–74)

== Honours ==
- Midland Alliance Champions 2001–02, 2002–03
- Midland Alliance Davis League Cup Winners 2000–01
- Midland Alliance Joe McGorian Cup Winners 2001, 2002
- Barclays Comm Services Cup Winners 1992–93
- Southern League Midland Division Champions 1990–91
- Southern League Division One North Champions 1973–74
- Southern League Merit Cup Winners 1973–74
- Birmingham League Champions 1923–24
- Birmingham Combination Champions 1951–52
- Birmingham Senior Cup Winners 1949–50, 1958–59, 1967–68, 2017–18, 2022–23
- Worcestershire Senior Cup Winners 1904–05, 1905–06, 1919–20, 1921–22, 1923–24, 1927–28, 1949–50, 1967–68, 1980–81, 2010–11, 2011–12, 2012–13
- Herefordshire Senior Cup Winners 1954–55
- Campkin President Cup Winners 1970–71
- Albion Shield Winners 1943–44
- Kidderminster Cup Winners 1887–88
- Keyes Cup Winners 1937–38, 1962–63
- Dudley Guest Hospital Cup Winners 1891–92
- Worcester Charity Cup Winners 1887–88
- Brierley Hill Youth League Coronation Cup Winners 1956–57
- Midland Floodlit Youth League League Cup Winners 2004–05

== Players ==
=== Current squad ===
As of 1 July 2025

Note: Flags indicate national team as defined under FIFA eligibility rules; some limited exceptions apply. Players may hold more than one non-FIFA nationality.

Pos.	Nation	Player
GK	ENG	Stan Amos
GK	ENG	Charlie Price
DF	ENG	Brad Bood
DF	ENG	Jake Cooper
DF	ENG	Joel Kettle
DF	ENG	Harvey Portman
DF	ENG	Blaine Rowe
DF	ENG	Jenson Sumnall
MF	ENG	Jack Concannon
MF	ENG	Matt Harland

Pos.	Nation	Player
MF	ENG	Archie Kirton
MF	ENG	Dominic Lewis
MF	ENG	Olly Shaw
MF	ENG	Jai Verma
FW	ENG	Tyrone Barnett
FW	ENG	Ethan Freemantle
FW	ENG	Leo Gouveia
FW	ENG	Alex Jones (Captain)
FW	ENG	Ari-Jae Shaw
FW	ENG	Jordan McFarlane-Archer

The Southern Football League does not use a squad numbering system.

== Club officials ==
=== Coaching staff ===
As of 15 December 2025

Role	Name
Manager	Scott Adey-Linforth
Assistant Manager	Darryl Knights
Coach	Drew Canavan
Coach	Richard Batchelor

=== Club Directors/Officers ===
As of 21 November 2024

Role	Name
Chairman	Andy Pountney
Vice Chairman	Andy Bullingham
President	Hugh Clark
Vice-President	Steve Hyde
Director	Gordon Thomas
Director	Stuart Jessup
Director	Vic Younis
Club Secretary	Callum Terry

== Supporters' Player of the Year ==
Season	Level	Name	Position	Ref
2011–12	7	Sam Rock	Midfielder	
2012–13	7	Ben Billingham	Midfielder	
2013–14	7	Sean Geddes	Midfielder	
2014–15	7	Chris Knight	Defender	
2015–16	7	Brian Smikle	Defender	
2016–17	7	Luke Benbow	Striker	
2017–18	7	Leon Broadhurst	Midfielder	
2018–19	7	Aaron Forde	Midfielder	
2019–20	7	N/A	N/A	
2020–21	7	N/A	N/A	
2021–22	7	Reece Styche	Striker	
2022–23	7	Jason Cowley	Striker	
2023–24	7	Charlie Price	Goalkeeper	
2024–25	7	Joel Kettle	Defender	
