= Ethan Freemantle =

English footballer (born 2000)

Personal information
- Date of birth: 6 February 2000 (age 26)
- Place of birth: Coventry, England
- Height: 5 ft 10 in (1.77 m)
- Position: Striker

Youth career
- Walsall
- –2019: Kidderminster Harriers

Senior career*
Years	Team	Apps	(Gls)
2019–2024	Kidderminster Harriers	83	(12)
2023	→ Gloucester City (loan)	9	(1)
2023	→ Hereford (loan)	13	(2)
2023–2024	→ Stourbridge (loan)	10	(6)
2024–2025	Stourbridge	43	(10)
- * Club domestic league appearances and goals as of 01:24, 13 September 2025 (UTC)

Ethan Freemantle (born 6 February 2000) is an English footballer who most recently played as a striker for Southern League Premier Division Central club Stourbridge.

== Career ==
Freemantle came through the youth academy at Kidderminster Harriers, signing professional terms in 2019. Before Kidderminster he was a scholar at Walsall. While with Kidderminster's U23 side, he won the Midland Football League U21 play-off final.

In February 2021, he extended his contract at Kidderminster until the end of the 2022–23 season. During Kidderminster's run to the FA Cup fourth round in 2022, he was described by team-mate Mark Carrington as the team's "Diego Costa".

On 1 August 2023, Freemantle joined National League North club Gloucester City on a three-month loan. He scored his first and only goal of his loan spell in a 2–0 league win over Rushall Olympic on 28 August.

On 22 September 2023, Freemantle joined National League North club Hereford on a three-month loan. He scored his first goal for Hereford in a 1–0 win over Rochdale in the FA Cup fourth qualifying round on 14 October, and his first league goal one month later in a 4–1 win over Banbury United on 14 November. He returned to Kidderminster at the end of his loan spell in December.

A day after leaving Hereford, Freemantle joined Southern League Premier Division Central club Stourbridge on loan until the end of the season.

Following the end of the 2023–24 campaign, despite Kidderminster's relegation to the National League North and also showing good form at Stourbridge, Freemantle was released. Subsequently it was later announced on 14 June 2024, that he would be returning to Stourbridge on a permanent deal. On 11 September 2025, Stourbridge announced on social media that Freemantle had departed the club and was relocating to Dubai.

== Career statistics ==
As of match played 25 August 2025

Appearances and goals by club, season and competition
Club	Season	League			FA Cup		League Cup		Other		Total	
Club	Season	Division	Apps	Goals	Apps	Goals	Apps	Goals	Apps	Goals	Apps	Goals
Kidderminster Harriers	2019–20	National League North	11	0	0	0	—		0	0	11	0
Kidderminster Harriers	2020–21	National League North	9	1	0	0	—		1 (Note: Appearance(s) in FA Trophy)	0	10	1
Kidderminster Harriers	2021–22	National League North	29	5	4	1	—		3 (Note: Two appearances in FA Trophy; one appearance in National League North play-offs)	0	36	6
Kidderminster Harriers	2022–23	National League North	34	6	3	1	—		2	0	39	7
Kidderminster Harriers	Total		83	12	7	2	—		6	0	96	14
Gloucester City (loan)	2023–24	National League North	9	1	0	0	—		0	0	9	1
Hereford (loan)	2023–24	National League North	13	2	3	1	—		1	1	17	4
Stourbridge (loan)	2023–24	SL Premier Division Central	10	6	—		—		—		10	6
Stourbridge	2024–25	SL Premier Division Central	38	10	1	2	—		3 (Note: One appearance in FA Trophy; one appearance in Worcestershire Senior Cup; two appearances, one goal in Walsall Senior Cup)	1	42	13
Stourbridge	2025–26	SL Premier Division Central	5	0	0	0	—		0	0	5	0
Stourbridge	Total		53	16	1	2	—		3	1	57	19
Career total			158	31	11	5	—		10	2	179	38
