= 2026–27 Barnet F.C. season =

139th season in existence of Barnet FC

Barnet
2026–27 season
- Chairman: Anthony Kleanthous
- Head coach: Dean Brennan
- Stadium: The Hive Stadium
- EFL Cup: First round

The 2026–27 season is the 139th season in the history of Barnet Football Club and their second consecutive season being in League Two. In addition to the domestic league, the club will also participate in the FA Cup, the EFL Cup, and the EFL Trophy.

== Transfers and contracts ==
=== In ===
Date	Pos.	Player	From	Fee	Ref.
18 June 2026	CF	(England) Isiah Noel-Williams	(England) Hemel Hempstead Town	Undisclosed	
19 June 2026	CF	(England) Jack Maskell	(England) Darlington	Undisclosed	
1 July 2026 (Note: The transfer was announced on 29 June, and would become official on July 1 once Ashby-Hammond's contract at Barnet expired.)	GK	(England) Taye Ashby-Hammond	(England) Stevenage	Free	
1 July 2026 (Note: The transfer was announced on 12 June, and would become official on July 1 once Comley's contract at Walsall expired.)	CDM	(Montserrat) Brandon Comley	(England) Walsall	Free	
1 July 2026 (Note: The transfer was announced on 5 June, and would become official on July 1 once Farquhar's contract at Crystal Palace expired.)	CB	(Northern Ireland) Craig Farquhar	(England) Crystal Palace	Free	
1 July 2026 (Note: The transfer was announced on 24 June, and would become official on July 1 once Knowles' contract at Forest Green Rovers expired.)	LW	(England) Tom Knowles	(England) Forest Green Rovers	Free	
1 July 2026 (Note: The transfer was announced on 12 June, and would become official on July 1 once Lakin's contract at Walsall expired.)	CM	(England) Charlie Lakin	(England) Walsall	Free	
1 July 2026 (Note: The transfer was announced on 2 June, and would become official on July 1 once Williams' contract at Crewe Alexandra expired.)	CB	(Wales) Zac Williams	(England) Crewe Alexandra	Free	
10 July 2026	CB	(England) Will Wright	(England) Swindon Town	Free	

=== Loaned in ===
Date	Pos.	Player	From	Loaned until	Ref.
21 July 2026	DM	(Republic of Ireland) Oisin Gallagher	(England) Lincoln City	End of Season	
25 July 2026	GK	(England) Matthew Cox	(England) Brentford	End of Season	
20 August 2026	CM	(England) Jake Reeves	(England) AFC Wimbledon	End of Season	
1 September 2026	RW	(England) Damola Ajayi	(England) Tottenham Hotspur	End of Season	

=== Loaned out ===
Date	Pos.	Player	To	Loaned until	Ref.
4 August 2026	CM	(England) Jack Blower	(England) Waltham Abbey	End of Season	
22 August 2026	CB	(Northern Ireland) Craig Farquhar	(England) Solihull Moors	19 September 2026	
29 August 2026	CM	(England) Patrick Matejko	(England) Hertford Town	26 September 2026	
26 September 2026	CB	(England) Rohat Matyar	(England) Cambridge City	26 October 2026	
15 October 2026	LW	(England) Bright Siaw	(England) Hampton & Richmond Borough	9 January 2027	

=== Out ===
Date	Pos.	Player	To	Fee	Ref.
15 June 2026 (Note: The transfer was announced on 8 June, and would become official on June 15 once the transfer window opened.)	RW	(England) Ryan Glover	(England) Stockport County	Undisclosed	
23 June 2026	GK	(England) Joe Wright	(England) Billericay Town	Undisclosed	
1 July 2026	GK	(Wales) Owen Evans	(England) Altrincham	Undisclosed	
11 July 2026	CB	(England) Joe Rye	(England) Tamworth	Undisclosed	
29 September 2026	CB	(England) Will Wright	(England) Boreham Wood	Undisclosed	

=== Released / out of contract ===
Date	Pos.	Player	Subsequent club	Joined date	Ref.
16 June 2026	RB	(England) Joe Kizzi	(England) Hornchurch	16 June 2026	
30 June 2026	RW	(Antigua and Barbuda) Rhys Browne	(England) Chelmsford City	1 July 2026	
30 June 2026	CM	(England) Anthony Hartigan	(England) Southend United	1 July 2026	
30 June 2026	CM	(Republic of Ireland) Emmanuel Osadebe	(England) Sutton United	1 July 2026	
30 June 2026	CM	(England) Mark Shelton	(England) York City	1 July 2026	
30 June 2026	CF	(England) Callum Stead	(England) Cambridge United	1 July 2026	
30 June 2026	CF	(Democratic Republic of the Congo) Britt Assombalonga	(England) Harborough Town	23 July 2026	
30 June 2026	CF	(England) Oliver Hawkins	(England) Eastleigh	1 August 2026	
30 June 2026	CM	(England) Dennis Adeniran	(England) Slough Town	29 September 2026	

=== New Contract ===
Date	Pos.	Player	Contract expiry	Ref.
20 July 2026	CB	(Croatia) Nikola Tavares	30 June 2028	
3 August 2026	LB	(England) Myles Kenlock	30 June 2027	
11 August 2026	CB	(England) Danny Collinge	Undisclosed	
21 August 2026	RB	(Democratic Republic of the Congo) Aaron Liwala	Undisclosed	

== Pre-season and friendlies ==
On 18 May, Barnet announced a pre-season friendly, against Watford. Twelve days later, a second home friendly was confirmed against Luton Town. On 4 June, a trip to face Hitchin Town was added. A fourth opponent was later added, in Oxford United. A fifth friendly was confirmed against Milton Keynes Dons. On 16 June, A sixth friendly was announced against Bromley. On 24 June, it was announced Barnet would travel to Hemel Hempstead Town for the annual Spencer McCall Memorial Game.

Win Draw Loss Fixtures

4 July 2026 Friendly	Barnet	8–3	Southall	Edgware
12:00 BST	Trialist C; Lakin; Smith; Noel-Williams; Tshimanga x2; Siaw; Trialist D	Report		Stadium: The Hive London; Attendance: 0 (BCD)

7 July 2026 Friendly	Hitchin Town	0–2	Barnet	Hitchin
19:45 BST		Report	Siaw 40'; Trialist B 85'	Stadium: Top Field

11 July 2026 Friendly	Hemel Hempstead Town	1–2	Barnet	Hemel Hempstead
15:00 BST	Rowan 16'	Report	Maskell 22'; Trialist D 90+6'	Stadium: Vauxhall Road
Note: Spencer McCall Memorial Game

14 July 2026 Friendly	Barnet	2–2	Watford	Edgware
19:45 BST	Lakin 38'; Noel-Williams 64'	Report	Massiah-Edwards 39'; Kjerrumgaard 83'	Stadium: The Hive
Note: Fixture was initially scheduled for 15 July, but was rescheduled due to England's progression in the 2026 FIFA World Cup.

18 July 2026 Friendly	Barnet	2–2	Luton Town	Edgware
13:00 BST	Ofoborh 6'; Tshimanga 77'	Report	Wells 43'; Luker 73'	Stadium: The Hive Stadium

25 July 2026 Friendly	Barnet	1–2	Oxford United	Edgware
15:00 BST	Senior 54'	Report	Mills 3'; O'Donkor 88'	Stadium: The Hive Stadium

28 July 2026 Friendly	Barnet	0–0	Milton Keynes Dons	Edgware
19:30 BST		Report		Stadium: The Hive Stadium

1 August 2026 Friendly	Barnet	1–1	Bromley	Edgware
15:00 BST	Tshimanga 11' (pen.)	Report	McKiernan 24'	Stadium: The Hive Stadium

== Competitions ==
=== League Two ===
==== League table ====
Pos	Team	Pld	W	D	L	GF	GA	GD	Pts	Promotion, qualification or relegation
1	Salford City	15	10	2	3	26	16	+10	32	Promotion to EFL League One
2	Barnet	13	7	5	1	28	18	+10	26	Promotion to EFL League One
3	Grimsby Town	15	6	5	4	28	19	+9	23	Promotion to EFL League One
4	York City	15	6	5	4	25	21	+4	23	Qualification for League Two play-offs
5	Crewe Alexandra	15	5	8	2	19	19	0	23	Qualification for League Two play-offs

Updated to match(es) played on 14 November 2026. Source: EFL Official Website
Rules for classification: 1) Points; 2) Goal difference; 3) Number of goals scored; 4) Head-to-head results; 5) Wins; 6) Away goals; 7) Penalty points (sec 9.5); 8) 12-point sending off offences

==== Results summary ====
Overall								Home						Away					
Pld	W	D	L	GF	GA	GD	Pts	W	D	L	GF	GA	GD	W	D	L	GF	GA	GD
13	7	5	1	28	18	+10	26	4	2	1	15	10	+5	3	3	0	13	8	+5

Last updated: 31 October 2026.
Source: Soccerway

==== Results by round ====
Round	1	2	3	4	5	6	7	10	11	12	13	9^{2}	14	15^{3}	16	8^{1}	17	18	19	20	21	22	23	24	25	26	27	28	29	30	31	32	33
Ground	H	A	H	A	A	H	H	A	A	H	H	H	A	A	H	A	A	H	H	A	H	A	A	H	H	A	A	H	A	H	H	A	H
Result	W	W	D	D	D	W	W	W	W	L	D	W	D	P																			
Position	3	1	1	2	3	1	1	2	2	2	2	2	2	P																			
Points	3	6	7	8	9	12	15	18	21	21	22	25	26	P																			

Source: EFL
A = Away; H = Home; W = Win; D = Draw; L = Loss; P = Postponed
Notes:
- ^{1} Matchday 8 (vs. Crawley Town) was postponed due to international call-ups.
- ^{2} Matchday 9 (vs. York City) was postponed due to international call-ups.
- ^{2} Matchday 15 (vs. Walsall) was postponed due to international call-ups.

==== Matches ====
On 25 June, the League Two fixtures were revealed.

Win Draw Loss Fixtures

15 August 2026 1	Barnet	3–1	Salford City	Edgware
15:00 BST	Gallagher 24', (yellow card) 79'; Lakin 42'; Tshimanga 87'	Report	Turton (yellow card) 23'; Powell (yellow card) 37'; Molyneux (yellow card) 59'; Oluwo 90'	Stadium: The Hive Stadium; Attendance: 2,230 (255 Salford fans); Referee: Richard Eley

22 August 2026 2	Shrewsbury Town	1–3	Barnet	Shrewsbury
15:00 BST	Davison 41'; Turner-Cooke (yellow card) 68'	Report	Reeves 13'; Lakin 83'; Knowles 90'	Stadium: Croud Meadow; Attendance: 5,129; Referee: William Davis

29 August 2026 3	Barnet	2–2	Cheltenham Town	Edgware
12:30 BST	Lakin 11'; Cox (yellow card) 53'; Tshimanga 78' (pen.)	Report	Tomkinson (yellow card) 13'; McWilliams (yellow card) 38'; Broom 60'; McCann 64'; Willcox (yellow card) 76'	Stadium: The Hive Stadium; Referee: Abigail Byrne
Note: Fixture was initially scheduled for a 15:00 kick-off, but was brought forward for live Sky Sports.

1 September 2026 4	Exeter City	1–1	Barnet	Exeter
19:45 BST	Gordon (yellow card) 45+2'; Cole 67'	Report	Comley (yellow card) 22'; Lakin (yellow card) 41'; Kanu 60'; Noel-Williams (yellow card) 82'; Knowles (yellow card) 86'	Stadium: St James Park; Attendance: 4,826; Referee: Sunny Singh Gill

5 September 2026 5	Chesterfield	3–3	Barnet	Whittington Moor
15:00 BST	Hutton (yellow card) 21'; McEachran (yellow card) 33'; Pond (yellow card) 37'; Marsh 39', 71'; Randall 90+3'	Report	Knowles 29'; Williams 45+3'; Gallagher (yellow card) 50'; Comley (yellow card) 60'; Kanu (yellow card) 72'; Tshimanga 88'	Stadium: SMH Group Stadium; Referee: Leigh Doughty

12 September 2026 6	Barnet	2–1	Accrington Stanley	Edgware
15:00 BST	Lakin 57', 72'		Walton (yellow card) 6'; Caton 27'; Woods (yellow card) 16'; Anderson (yellow card) 29'; Matthews (yellow card) 55' (red card) 74'; O'Brien (yellow card) 81'	Stadium: The Hive Stadium

19 September 2026 7	Barnet	3–1	Fleetwood Town	Edgware
15:00 BST	Tshimanga 10' (pen.); Lakin 60'; Kanu 62', (yellow card) 75'; Gallagher (yellow card) 69'; Ofoborh (yellow card) 85' (red card) 85'		Davies 36'; Rooney (yellow card) 43'; Evans (yellow card) 90+5'	Stadium: The Hive Stadium; Referee: Scott Jackson

10 October 2026 10	Bristol Rovers	1–3	Barnet	Horfield
15:00 BST	Harrison 4'; Forde (yellow card) 29'; Purrington (yellow card) 65'; Leigh (red card) 85'		Kanu (yellow card) 31'; Senior 79'; Williams 86'; Tshimanga 90+5'; Collinge (yellow card) 90+5'	Stadium: Memorial Stadium; Attendance: 8,996; Referee: Tim Robinson

17 October 2026 11	Tranmere Rovers	1–2	Barnet	Birkenhead
15:00 BST	Vaulks 22', (yellow card) 71'; Senior (yellow card) 51' (red card) 90+2'	Report	Williams (yellow card) 20'; Tshimanga 55', 87' (pen.); Kanu (yellow card) 70'	Stadium: Prenton Park; Referee: Jamie Robinson

20 October 2026 12	Barnet	1–3	Swindon Town	Edgware
19:45 BST	Tshimanga 90'	Report	Clark 8'; Drinan 35', 37'; Millard (yellow card) 90+2'	Stadium: The Hive Stadium; Attendance: 2,200; Referee: Ben Atkinson

24 October 2026 13	Barnet	1–1	Oldham Athletic	Edgware
15:00 BST	Tshimanga 20'; Noel-Williams (yellow card) 66' (red card) 70'	Report	Fondop (yellow card) 86', (goal) 90+5'	Stadium: The Hive Stadium; Attendance: 2,632; Referee: Alan Young

27 October 2026 9	Barnet	3–1	York City	Edgware
19:45 GMT	Tshimanga 39'; Maskell (yellow card) 46'; Kanu (yellow card) 49'; Reeves 80', (yellow card) 83'; McNally 87' (o.g.); Ajayi (yellow card) 87'	Report	Hunt (yellow card) 29'; Read 37'; Boateng (yellow card) 45+4' (red card) 52'; Pearce (yellow card) 62'; King (yellow card) 77'; Kitching (yellow card) 90+2'; Williams (yellow card) 90+2'	Stadium: The Hive Stadium; Referee: Ben Toner
Note: Fixture was initially scheduled for 3 October, but was rearranged due to international call-ups.

31 October 2026 14	Crewe Alexandra	1–1	Barnet	Crewe
15:00 GMT	Hutchinson (yellow card) 33'; Williams 85' (o.g.)	Report	Knowles 34'; Tavares (yellow card) 36'; Ofoborh (yellow card) 45'; Gallagher (yellow card) 72'	Stadium: Mornflake Stadium; Attendance: 4,855 (431 Barnet fans); Referee: Harrison Blair

14 November 2026 15	Walsall	Postponed	Barnet	Bescot
15:00 GMT				Stadium: Bescot Stadium
Note: Fixture was postponed due to international call-ups.

21 November 2026 16	Barnet	v	Port Vale	Edgware
15:00 GMT				Stadium: The Hive Stadium

24 November 2026 8	Crawley Town	v	Barnet	Crawley
19:45 GMT				Stadium: Broadfield Stadium
Note: Fixture was initially scheduled for a 15:00 kick-off, but was brought forward for live Sky Sports. It was then postponed and rearranged due to international call-ups.

28 November 2026 17	Rochdale	v	Barnet	Spotland
15:00 GMT				Stadium: Crown Oil Arena

1 December 2026 18	Barnet	v	Rotherham United	Edgware
19:45 GMT				Stadium: The Hive Stadium

12 December 2026 19	Barnet	v	Northampton Town	Edgware
15:00 GMT				Stadium: The Hive Stadium

19 December 2026 20	Grimsby Town	v	Barnet	Cleethorpes
15:00 GMT				Stadium: Blundell Park

26 December 2026 21	Barnet	v	Colchester United	Edgware
15:00 GMT				Stadium: The Hive Stadium

29 December 2026 22	Gillingham	v	Barnet	Gillingham
19:45 GMT				Stadium: Priestfield Stadium

1 January 2027 23	Newport County	v	Barnet	Newport
15:00 GMT				Stadium: Rodney Parade

9 January 2027 24	Barnet	v	Grimsby Town	Edgware
12:30 GMT				Stadium: The Hive Stadium
Note: Fixture was initially scheduled for a 15:00 kick-off, but was brought forward for live Sky Sports broadcasting.

16 January 2027 25	Barnet	v	Tranmere Rovers	Edgware
15:00 GMT				Stadium: The Hive Stadium

19 January 2027 26	Swindon Town	v	Barnet	Swindon
19:45 GMT				Stadium: County Ground

23 January 2027 27	Oldham Athletic	v	Barnet	Oldham
15:00 GMT				Stadium: Boundary Park

30 January 2027 28	Barnet	v	Crewe Alexandra	Edgware
15:00 GMT				Stadium: The Hive Stadium

6 February 2027 29	Cheltenham Town	v	Barnet	Cheltenham
15:00 GMT				Stadium: EV Charger Points Stadium

9 February 2027 30	Barnet	v	Exeter City	Edgware
19:45 GMT				Stadium: The Hive Stadium

13 February 2027 31	Barnet	v	Chesterfield	Edgware
15:00 GMT				Stadium: The Hive Stadium

20 February 2027 32	Accrington Stanley	v	Barnet	Accrington
15:00 GMT				Stadium: Wham Stadium

27 February 2027 33	Barnet	v	Walsall	Edgware
12:30 GMT				Stadium: The Hive Stadium
Note: Fixture was initially scheduled for a 15:00 kick-off, but was brought forward for live Sky Sports broadcasting.

=== FA Cup ===
Barnet were drawn at home to Tranmere Rovers in the first round and away to Plymouth Parkway in the second round.

Win Draw Loss Fixtures

7 November 2026 First round	Barnet	3–0	Tranmere Rovers	Edgware
15:00 GMT	Smith 80'; Ofoborh 90'; Ajayi 90+6'	Report	Turnbull (yellow card) 36'; Scott (yellow card) 39'; Whitaker (yellow card) 76'	Stadium: The Hive Stadium; Attendance: 1,615 (inc. 361 away); Referee: Carl Brook

6 December 2026 Second round	Plymouth Parkway	v	Barnet	Manadon
17:30 GMT				Stadium: Bolitho Park
Note: Fixture was selected for live TNT Sports and HBO Max broadcasting.

=== EFL Cup ===
Barnet were drawn away to Cambridge United in the first round.

Win Draw Loss Fixtures

8 August 2026 First round	Cambridge United	2–1	Barnet	Cambridge
13:00 BST	Knight 52'; Heath 57'; Watts (yellow card) 86'; Eastwood (yellow card) 89'	Report	Tshimanga 49'; Kanu (yellow card) 86'; Williams (yellow card) 88'	Stadium: Cledara Abbey Stadium; Attendance: 3,521; Referee: Carl Brook

=== EFL Trophy ===
==== Group stage ====
Barnet were drawn against AFC Wimbledon, Leyton Orient and Arsenal U21 into Southern Group F.

Pos	Div	Team	Pld	W	PW	PL	L	GF	GA	GD	Pts	Qualification
1	L2	Barnet	3	2	1	0	0	9	3	+6	8	Advance to Round 2
2	ACA	Arsenal U21	3	2	0	0	1	5	7	−2	6	Advance to Round 2
3	L1	AFC Wimbledon	3	0	0	2	1	2	3	−1	2	
4	L1	Leyton Orient	3	0	1	0	2	4	7	−3	2	

Source: EFL

Win Draw Loss Fixtures

18 August 2026 Group stage	Barnet	5–1	Arsenal U21	Edgware
19:45 BST	Siaw 9'; Maskell 25'; Comley (yellow card) 27'; Knowles 47', 56', 69', (yellow card) 77'	Report	Murisa (yellow card) 16'; Knowles 36' (o.g.)	Stadium: The Hive Stadium; Attendance: 1,507 (498 visitors); Referee: Stephen Parkinson

6 October 2026 Group stage	AFC Wimbledon	0–0 (7–8 p)	Barnet	Wimbledon
19:00 BST	Seddon (yellow card) 23'; Yiadom (yellow card) 62'; Smith (red card) 77'		Liwala-Lukizalamu (yellow card) 16'; Williams (yellow card) 77'	Stadium: The Cherry Red Records Stadium; Attendance: 1,363; Referee: Callum Winchester
	Penalties
	Nelson (penalty scored); Seddon (penalty scored); Harrison (penalty scored); Ogundere (penalty scored); Hedges (penalty scored); Kirby (penalty scored); Moran (penalty missed); Leach (penalty scored); Goma (penalty missed)		(penalty scored) Williams; (penalty scored) Maskell; (penalty scored) Kanu; (penalty scored) Noel-Williams; (penalty scored) Ajayi; (penalty scored) Kenlock; (penalty missed) Knowles; (penalty scored) Ofoborh; (penalty scored) Crichlow

10 November 2026 Group stage	Barnet	4–2	Leyton Orient	Edgware
19:00 GMT	Maskell 33'; Smith 45+1'; Liwala (yellow card) 48'; Springett 59' (o.g.); Siaw 65'; Noel-Williams (yellow card) 90+5'	Report	Morris 43'; Scarlett (yellow card) 53', (goal) 86'	Stadium: The Hive Stadium; Attendance: 770; Referee: Scott Jackson

== Statistics ==
=== Appearances and goals ===
As of match played 10 November 2026

Players with no appearances are not included on the list; italics indicate a loaned in player

No.	Pos	Nat	Player	Total		League Two		FA Cup		EFL Cup		EFL Trophy	
No.	Pos	Nat	Player	Apps	Goals	Apps	Goals	Apps	Goals	Apps	Goals	Apps	Goals
1	GK	(England) ENG	Taye Ashby-Hammond	2	0	0+0	0	0+0	0	0+0	0	2+0	0
3	DF	(England) ENG	Romoney Crichlow	10	0	5+2	0	1+0	0	0+0	0	1+1	0
4	DF	(England) ENG	Danny Collinge	15	0	13+0	0	1+0	0	1+0	0	0+0	0
5	DF	(England) ENG	Adam Senior	17	1	13+0	1	1+0	0	1+0	0	0+2	0
6	DF	(Wales) WAL	Zac Williams	15	2	9+2	2	0+0	0	1+0	0	3+0	0
7	FW	(England) ENG	Tom Knowles	18	6	7+6	3	0+1	0	0+1	0	3+0	3
8	MF	(England) ENG	Charlie Lakin	15	6	13+0	6	1+0	0	1+0	0	0+0	0
9	FW	(England) ENG	Jack Maskell	13	2	1+8	0	1+0	0	0+0	0	3+0	2
10	MF	(Nigeria) NGR	Nnamdi Ofoborh	16	1	7+5	0	0+1	1	1+0	0	2+0	0
11	FW	(Sierra Leone) SLE	Idris Kanu	15	2	12+0	2	1+0	0	1+0	0	0+1	0
13	GK	(England) ENG	Matthew Cox	15	0	13+0	0	1+0	0	1+0	0	0+0	0
14	MF	(Montserrat) MSR	Brandon Comley	15	0	8+5	0	1+0	0	0+0	0	1+0	0
17	FW	(England) ENG	Damola Ajayi	11	1	1+7	0	0+1	1	0+0	0	2+0	0
18	DF	(England) ENG	Kane Smith	5	2	1+1	0	0+1	1	0+1	0	1+0	1
20	FW	(England) ENG	Kabongo Tshimanga	14	11	13+0	10	0+0	0	1+0	1	0+0	0
22	MF	(Republic of Ireland) IRL	Oisin Gallagher	16	1	13+0	1	1+0	0	1+0	0	0+1	0
23	MF	(England) ENG	Jake Reeves	12	2	5+5	2	1+0	0	0+0	0	0+1	0
25	DF	(Croatia) CRO	Nikola Tavares	11	0	7+2	0	1+0	0	1+0	0	0+0	0
30	DF	(England) ENG	Myles Kenlock	11	0	2+5	0	0+0	0	1+0	0	3+0	0
32	FW	(England) ENG	Isiah Noel-Williams	9	0	0+7	0	0+0	0	0+0	0	2+0	0
33	FW	(England) ENG	Bright Siaw	4	2	0+1	0	0+0	0	0+0	0	3+0	2
35	DF	(Northern Ireland) NIR	Craig Farquhar	1	0	0+0	0	0+0	0	0+0	0	1+0	0
36	GK	(England) ENG	Anthony Haralambous	1	0	0+0	0	0+0	0	0+0	0	1+0	0
37	MF	(Democratic Republic of the Congo) COD	Aaron Liwala	4	0	0+0	0	0+1	0	0+0	0	3+0	0
38	MF	(England) ENG	Patrick Matejko	1	0	0+0	0	0+0	0	0+0	0	1+0	0
39	MF	(England) ENG	Mitchell Issott	1	0	0+0	0	0+0	0	0+0	0	0+1	0
40	DF	(England) ENG	Rohat Matyar	1	0	0+0	0	0+0	0	0+0	0	0+1	0
Players who featured but departed the club during the season:
12	DF	(England) ENG	Will Wright	6	0	0+4	0	0	0	0+1	0	1	0

=== Disciplinary record ===
As of match played 10 November 2026

Includes all competitive matches. The list is sorted by squad number when disciplinary points / points per card / number of cards are equal. Players with no cards not included in the list.

Rank	No.	Pos.	Nat.	Name	League Two			FA Cup			EFL Cup			EFL Trophy			Total		
Rank	No.	Pos.	Nat.	Name	Yellow card	Second yellow card	Red card	Yellow card	Second yellow card	Red card	Yellow card	Second yellow card	Red card	Yellow card	Second yellow card	Red card	Yellow card	Second yellow card	Red card
1	11	RW	(Sierra Leone)	Idris Kanu	5	0	0	0	0	0	1	0	0	0	0	0	6	0	0
2	6	CB	(Wales)	Zac Williams	2	0	0	0	0	0	1	0	0	1	0	0	4	0	0
2	22	CB	(Republic of Ireland)	Oisin Gallagher	4	0	0	0	0	0	0	0	0	0	0	0	4	0	0
2	32	CF	(England)	Isiah Noel Williams	1	1	0	0	0	0	0	0	0	1	0	0	2	1	0
5	10	CM	(Nigeria)	Nnamdi Ofoborh	1	1	0	0	0	0	0	0	0	0	0	0	1	1	0
5	14	CDM	(Montserrat)	Brandon Comley	2	0	0	0	0	0	0	0	0	1	0	0	3	0	0
5	7	LW	(England)	Tom Knowles	1	0	0	0	0	0	0	0	0	1	0	0	2	0	0
5	37	CM	(England)	Aaron Liwala	0	0	0	0	0	0	0	0	0	2	0	0	2	0	0
9	4	CB	(England)	Danny Collinge	1	0	0	0	0	0	0	0	0	0	0	0	1	0	0
9	8	CM	(England)	Charlie Lakin	1	0	0	0	0	0	0	0	0	0	0	0	1	0	0
9	9	CF	(England)	Jack Maskell	1	0	0	0	0	0	0	0	0	0	0	0	1	0	0
9	13	GK	(England)	Matthew Cox	1	0	0	0	0	0	0	0	0	0	0	0	1	0	0
9	17	RW	(England)	Damola Ajayi	1	0	0	0	0	0	0	0	0	0	0	0	1	0	0
9	23	CM	(England)	Jake Reeves	1	0	0	0	0	0	0	0	0	0	0	0	1	0	0
9	25	CB	(Croatia)	Nikola Tavares	1	0	0	0	0	0	0	0	0	0	0	0	1	0	0
Total					23	2	0	0	0	0	2	0	0	6	0	0	31	2	0

== Awards ==
=== Player awards ===
==== EFL League Two Player of the Month ====
Month	Player		Ref.
August	(England) Charlie Lakin	Nominated	
October	(England) Kabongo Tshimanga	Won	

==== PFA League Two Fans' Player of the Month ====
Month	Player	Result	Ref.
September	(England) Charlie Lakin	Nominated	
October	(England) Kabongo Tshimanga	Won	

=== Manager awards ===
==== EFL League Two Manager of the Month ====
Month	Manager	Result	Ref.
August	(Republic of Ireland) Dean Brennan	Won	
