= Ayayi =

Ayayi is a surname. Notable people with the surname include:

- Joël Ayayi (born 2000), French basketball player
- Valériane Ayayi (born 1994), French basketball player

== See also ==
- Ajayi
- Ayami
- Ayari
