= Craig Farquhar =

Northern Irish footballer (born 2003)

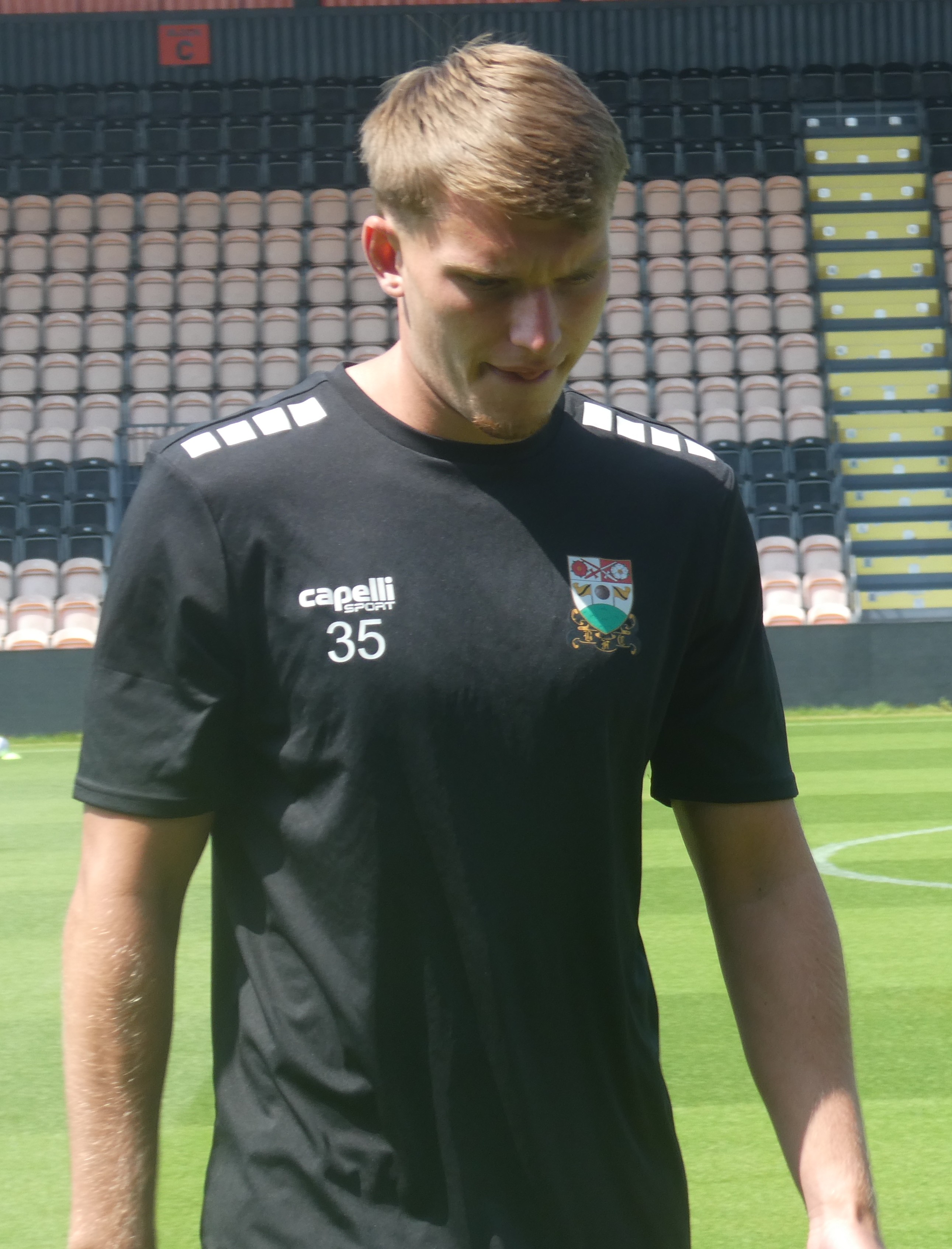

Personal information
- Full name: Craig John Farquhar
- Date of birth: 9 May 2003 (age 23)
- Place of birth: Ballymena, Northern Ireland
- Position: Centre-back

Team information
- Current team: Barnet
- Number: 35

Youth career
- –2021: Ballymena United

Senior career*
Years	Team	Apps	(Gls)
2021–2023	Ballymena United	11	(1)
2022	→ Dundela (loan)	12	(2)
2023–2024	Larne	21	(0)
2024–2026	Crystal Palace	0	(0)
2026–	Barnet	0	(0)
2026	→ Solihull Moors (loan)	3	(0)

International career
2024	Northern Ireland U21	1	(1)
- * Club domestic league appearances and goals as of 10:46, 28 September 2026 (UTC)

Craig John Farquhar (born 9 May 2003) is a Northern Irish professional footballer who plays for EFL League Two club Barnet.

== Club career ==
Born in Ballymena, Farquhar spent his early career with Ballymena United and on loan at Dundela. In June 2023, he signed for Larne for an undisclosed fee. After signing for Larne in June 2023 he turned professional. Farquhar signed for Crystal Palace in January 2024, also for an undisclosed fee.

In August 2024, in a friendly against former club Larne, Farquhar sustained a knee injury that kept him out for 18 months. Farquhar scored three goals in 22 appearances for Palace's under-21 team, but did not make any senior appearances.

He was released by Crystal Palace at the end of the 2025–26 season. On 5 June 2026, Farquhar agreed to join League Two club Barnet following his release from Crystal Palace. Farquhar joined Solihull Moors on a one month loan on 22 August 2026.

== International career ==
Farquhar has one cap and one goal for Northern Ireland U21.

== Career statistics ==
As of match played 18 September 2026

Appearances and goals by club, season and competition
Club	Season	League			National cup		League cup		Other		Total	
Club	Season	Division	Apps	Goals	Apps	Goals	Apps	Goals	Apps	Goals	Apps	Goals
Ballymena United	2021–22	NIFL Premiership	0	0	0	0	0	0	0	0	0	0
Ballymena United	2022–23	NIFL Premiership	11	1	3	1	0	0	0	0	14	2
Ballymena United	Total		0	0	0	0	0	0	0	0	0	0
Dundela (loan)	2021–22	NIFL Championship	12	2	0	0	0	0	0	0	12	2
Larne	2023–24	NIFL Premiership	21	0	1	0	2	0	3 (Note: Two appearances in UEFA Europa Conference League, one appearance in UEFA Champions League)	0	27	0
Crystal Palace	2023–24	Premier League	0	0	0	0	0	0	0	0	0	0
Crystal Palace	2024–25	Premier League	0	0	0	0	0	0	0	0	0	0
Crystal Palace	2025–26	Premier League	0	0	0	0	0	0	0	0	0	0
Crystal Palace	Total		0	0	0	0	0	0	0	0	0	0
Barnet	2026–27	League Two	0	0	0	0	0	0	1 (Note: Appearance in EFL Trophy)	0	1	0
Solihull Moors (loan)	2026–27	National League	3	0	0	0	0	0	1 (Note: Appearance in National League Cup)	0	4	0
Career total			47	3	4	1	2	0	5	0	58	4

== Honours ==
Larne

- NIFL Premiership: 2023-24
- County Antrim Shield: 2023-24
