= Taye Ashby-Hammond =

English footballer (born 1999)

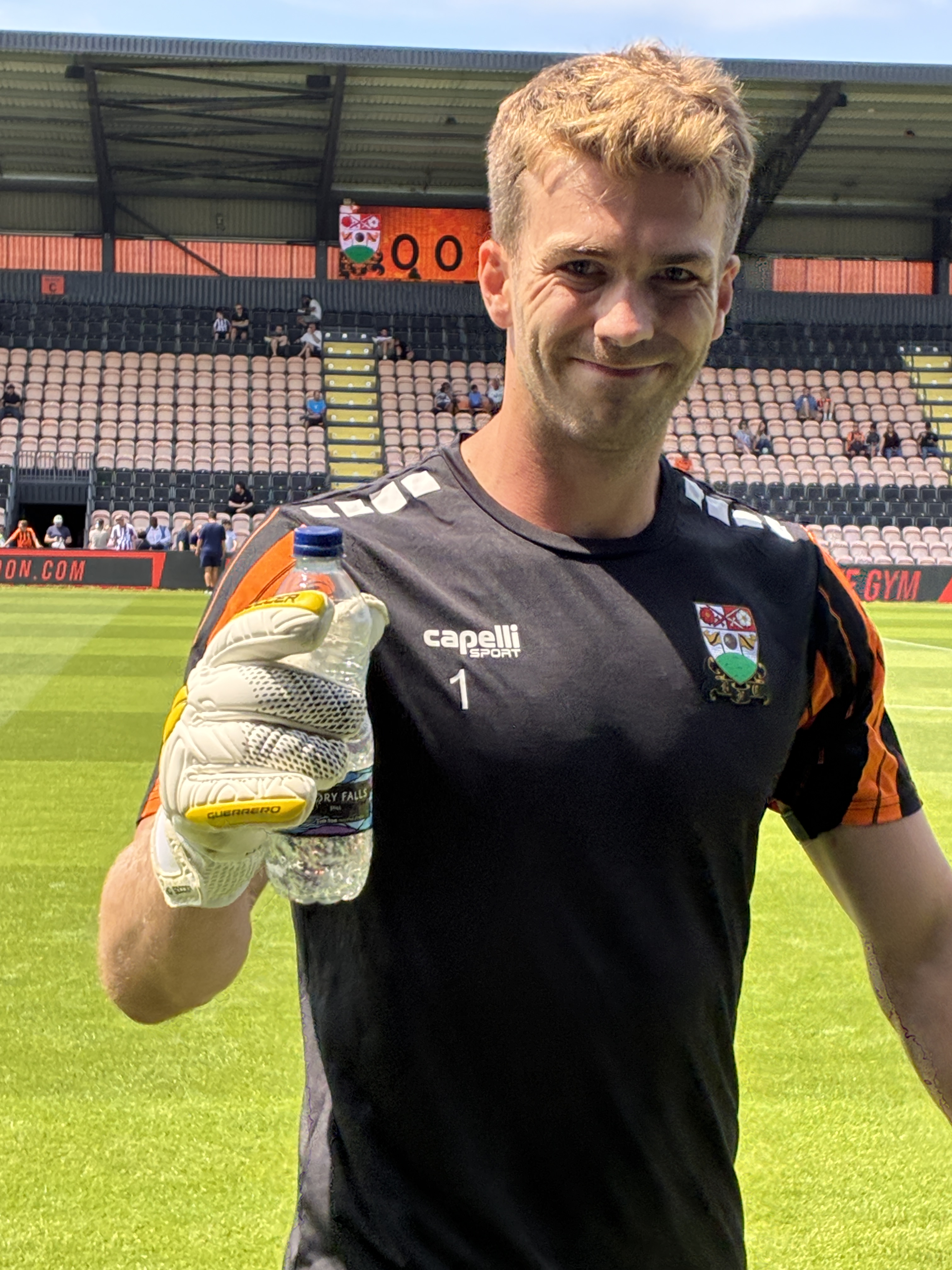
- Ashby-Hammond in 2026.

Personal information
- Full name: Taye Ashby-Hammond
- Date of birth: 21 March 1999 (age 27)
- Place of birth: Richmond, England
- Height: 1.90 m (6 ft 3 in)
- Position: Goalkeeper

Team information
- Current team: Barnet
- Number: 1

Youth career
- –2019: Fulham

Senior career*
Years	Team	Apps	(Gls)
2019–2023	Fulham	0	(0)
2019	→ Chipstead (loan)	19	(0)
2019	→ Maidenhead United (loan)	14	(0)
2020	→ Maidenhead United (loan)	8	(0)
2020–2021	→ Maidenhead United (loan)	33	(0)
2021–2022	→ Boreham Wood (loan)	25	(0)
2022–2023	→ Stevenage (loan)	26	(0)
2023–2026	Stevenage	41	(0)
2026–	Barnet	0	(0)

International career^{‡}
2014–2015	England U16	3	(0)
2014	England U17	2	(0)
- * Club domestic league appearances and goals as of 21:27, 10 November 2026 (UTC) ‡ National team caps and goals as of 21:18, 29 August 2022 (UTC)

Taye Ashby-Hammond (born 21 March 1999) is an English professional footballer who plays as a goalkeeper for EFL League Two club Barnet.

== Club career ==
Born in Richmond, London, Ashby-Hammond began his career with Fulham, spending time on loan at non-league clubs Chipstead, Maidenhead United, and Boreham Wood. At Boreham Wood he was "an integral part in the National League team's impressive run to the Fifth Round of the FA Cup".

He signed on loan for Stevenage in June 2022, becoming the club's ninth signing of the transfer window. In June 2023 it was announced that he would return to Stevenage after signing a permanent contract. He signed a "new, improved contract with the club" in July 2024. On 18 May 2026, the club announced it would be releasing him.

In June 2026 it was announced that he would sign for Barnet on 1 July 2026.

== International career ==
Ashby-Hammond has been capped by England at under-16 and under-17 levels.

== Personal life ==
Ashby-Hammond has a brother, Luca, who is also a goalkeeper.

== Career statistics ==
As of match played 10 November 2026

Appearances and goals by club, season and competition
Club	Season	League			FA Cup		EFL Cup		Other		Total	
Club	Season	Division	Apps	Goals	Apps	Goals	Apps	Goals	Apps	Goals	Apps	Goals
Fulham U21	2018–19	—			—		—		1 (Note: Appearance(s) in EFL Trophy)	0	1	0
Fulham	2019–20	Championship	0	0	0	0	0	0	0	0	0	0
Fulham	2020–21	Premier League	0	0	0	0	0	0	—		0	0
Fulham	2021–22	Championship	0	0	0	0	0	0	—		0	0
Fulham	2022–23	Premier League	0	0	0	0	0	0	—		0	0
Fulham	Total		0	0	0	0	0	0	0	0	0	0
Chipstead (loan)	2018–19	Isthmian League South Central Division	19	0	—		—		—		19	0
Maidenhead United (loan)	2019–20	National League	22	0	0	0	—		0	0	22	0
Maidenhead United (loan)	2020–21	National League	33	0	0	0	—		0	0	33	0
Boreham Wood (loan)	2021–22	National League	25	0	5	0	—		0	0	30	0
Stevenage (loan)	2022–23	League Two	26	0	3	0	0	0	0	0	29	0
Stevenage	2023–24	League One	31	0	4	0	0	0	3	0	38	0
Stevenage	2024–25	League One	9	0	0	0	0	0	5	0	14	0
Stevenage	2025–26	League One	1	0	0	0	1	0	4	0	6	0
Stevenage	Total		41	0	4	0	1	0	12	0	58	0
Barnet	2026–27	League Two	0	0	0	0	0	0	2	0	2	0
Career total			166	0	12	0	1	0	15	0	194	0
