= Ayari =

Ayari (Arabic: العياري adjective of عَيّار ayyār) is a Maghrebi (Tunisian, Algerian) and Persian surname.

More than 400 people with the name live in France (i.e. Maghrebis in France). An estimated 114 people with this surname lived in Germany as of 2017.

Notable people with the surname include:

- Kianoush Ayari (born 1951), Iranian writer and director
- Soheil Ayari (born 1970), French-Iranian race car driver
- Anis Ayari (born 1982), Tunisian footballer
- Hassine Ayari (born 1985), Tunisian Greco-Roman wrestler
- Hela Ayari (born 1994), Tunisian judoka
- Khaled Ayari (born 1990), Tunisian footballer
- Hamadi Ayari (born 1991), French-Tunisian footballer
- Kamel Ayari, Tunisian wheelchair racer
- Yasin Ayari (born 2003), Swedish footballer (with parents from Tunisia and Morocco)
- Ayari Aoyama (青山 綾里; born 1982), Japanese retired female butterfly swimmer
