= Dean Brennan =

Irish football manager (born 1980)

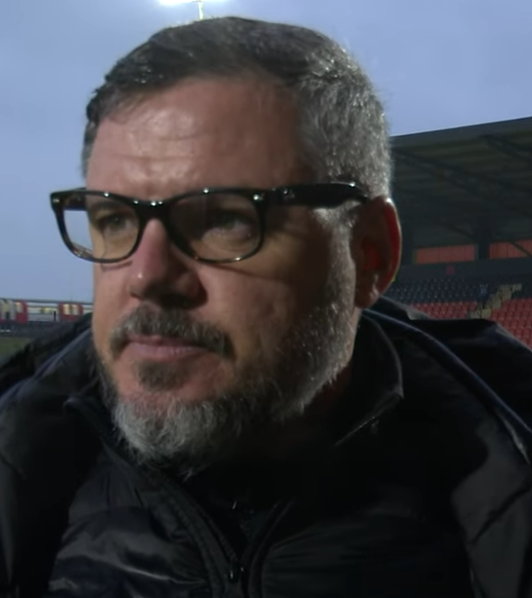
- Brennan in 2024

Personal information
- Full name: Dean James Gary Brennan
- Date of birth: 17 June 1980 (age 46)
- Place of birth: Dublin, Ireland
- Positions: Winger; attacking midfielder

Team information
- Current team: Barnet (Head Coach)

Youth career
- Lourdes Celtic

Senior career*
Years	Team	Apps	(Gls)
1999–2000	Sheffield Wednesday	0	(0)
2000	Bohemians	0	(0)
2000–2002	Luton Town	9	(0)
2002–2003	Hitchin Town	47	(20)
2003–2004	Stevenage Borough	17	(2)
2003–2004	→ Hendon (loan)	4	(2)
2004–2005	Grays Athletic	45	(9)
2005–2006	Lewes	12	(2)
2006	Dunstable Town	3	(0)
2006	AFC Wimbledon	10	(0)
2006	Cambridge City	0	(0)
2006–2007	Chesham United	?	(?)
2007	Hemel Hempstead Town	19	(1)
2007	Barton Rovers	?	(?)
2007–2008	Halesowen Town	32	(22)
2008–2009	Corby Town	0	(0)
2009–2010	Aylesbury		
2010–2011	Hemel Hempstead Town		
2011–2012	Dunstable Town	40	(13)

Managerial career
- 2010: Hemel Hempstead Town (caretaker)
- 2012–2018: Hemel Hempstead Town
- 2018–2019: Billericay Town
- 2019: Kingstonian
- 2019–2021: Wealdstone
- 2021–: Barnet
- * Club domestic league appearances and goals

Dean James Gary Brennan (born 17 June 1980) is an Irish professional football manager who is head coach of EFL League Two club Barnet.

As a player he was a winger / attacking midfielder who played professionally for Sheffield Wednesday, Bohemians and Luton Town before spending the remainder of his career in the English non-league.

== Playing career ==
Brennan began his footballing career at Sheffield Wednesday but despite impressing at youth and reserve levels, he did not make a first team appearance for the club. After being released by Wednesday in the summer of 2000, Brennan returned home to Ireland and went on trial at Bohemians. He made two appearances for the club in the FAI Super Cup but manager Roddy Collins decided not to sign the midfielder.

Brennan then went on trial at Luton Town and this time was more successful, earning a two-year contract at Kenilworth Road. He made his debut for the club in a 2–1 defeat at Wigan Athletic soon after. However, he never became a regular first team choice and in 2002 moved to Hitchin Town.

Luton would prove to be his last taste of League football as he drifted around the non-League scene with spells at Stevenage, Grays Athletic, Lewes, AFC Wimbledon, Cambridge City, Chesham United and Hemel Hempstead Town in the following years. In his brief spell with Wimbledon he earned the nickname "the Irish Beckham", a reference to his high quality crossing ability. While at Grays he helped them win the 2004–05 FA Trophy.

== Coaching career ==
In August 2009, Brennan signed for Spartan South Midlands Football League Premier Division side Aylesbury. In 2010, he rejoined Hemel Hempstead Town, and in March after the sacking of manager Gary Phillips, he was appointed as caretaker manager at the age of just 29.

Brennan began a second spell with Dunstable Town at the start of the 2011–12 season. He joined as player/coach and managed the team in cup ties. In May 2012 he rejoined Hemel Hempstead Town this time as manager. He guided the club to their highest ever finish (fourth in the Southern League Premier Division) to qualify for the playoffs. They reached the final against Gosport Borough, where they drew 2–2 before losing the game on penalties 5–4.

The following season saw promotion to the Conference South, after winning the Southern Premier League by 10 clear points.

After a poor start to their first season in the Conference South league, Hemel improved and eventually finished in 9th position, also reaching the First Round of the FA Cup where they lost at Bury 3–1.

The 2015–16 National League South season saw Brennan's Hemel narrowly miss out on the playoffs as Whitehawk pipped them on the final day to fifth place.

On 18 September 2018, Brennan and his assistant Stuart Maynard were appointed by team owner Glenn Tamplin as the managerial team at National League South side Billericay Town. However, they both had their contracts terminated by Tamplin after less than four months in the job on Wednesday 16 January 2019.

On 12 February 2019, Brennan was named as the new manager of Isthmian League Premier Division side Kingstonian. Stuart Maynard was also confirmed as the club's new assistant manager. However, on 16 March 2019, following a breakdown in relations with a club director over player liaison and team strategy, Brennan and Maynard re-evaluated their position and resigned after just five games in charge.

On 21 May 2019, Brennan was named as the new manager of National League South side Wealdstone, with Stuart Maynard as his assistant manager. In the shortened 2019–20 season, Brennan led the club to automatic promotion to the National League, as champions of the National League South. In December 2020, he turned down an approach from Barnet F.C. to be their manager. On 2 February 2021, Brennan resigned from his role at Wealdstone, with Maynard remaining at the club.

=== Barnet ===
On 10 June 2021, Brennan joined National League side Barnet in the Head of Football role with Harry Kewell taking on the role of Head Coach.

On 20 September 2021, after Harry Kewell was dismissed as Head Coach from Barnet F.C. having lost five and drawn two of his seven games, Brennan was appointed as Caretaker Head Coach of the club. On 17 February 2022, Brennan stepped back from his role of Head of Football and became Head Coach on a permanent basis.

Barnet reached the play-offs in the 2022–23 season after finishing in fifth position, with Brennan being awarded with the National League Manager of the Month award for December and a new contract until 2026.

Brennan was named the National League Manager of the Month for April and Barnet again reached the play-offs during the 2023–24 season after finishing second. Following the conclusion of the season, Barnet stated that Brennan remained fully committed to the club after an approach from Swindon Town. His loyalty was rewarded as he led the club to the National League title in the 2024–25 season. Following his title success, he was named National League Manager of the Season.

In February 2026, Brennan received a nine-game ban from the Football Association for verbally abusing a female referee during Barnet's home defeat by Shrewsbury Town on 6 September 2025, during which he was sent off for dissent by referee Kirsty Dowle. He also received a £2,000 fine and a mandatory education course, but said he did not agree with the FA's decision.

Following a strong start to the 2026–27 season, Brennan was named EFL League Two Manager of the Month for August 2026 having picked up seven points from three matches.

== Managerial statistics ==
As of match played 21 November 2026

Managerial record by team and tenure
Team	From	To	Record					Ref.
Team	From	To	P	W	D	L	Win %	Ref.
Hemel Hempstead Town (caretaker)	31 March 2010	30 June 2010	8	2	3	3	25.0	
Hemel Hempstead Town	24 May 2012	17 September 2018	304	140	78	86	46.1	
Billericay Town	18 September 2018	16 January 2019	23	10	5	8	43.5	
Kingstonian	12 February 2019	16 March 2019	5	0	1	4	0.0	
Wealdstone	21 May 2019	2 February 2021	60	32	9	19	53.3	
Barnet	20 September 2021	Present	271	136	63	72	50.2	
Total			671	320	159	192	47.7	

== Honours ==
=== Player ===
Grays Athletic

- Conference South: 2004–05
- FA Trophy: 2004–05

=== Manager ===
Hemel Hempstead Town

- Southern Football League Premier Division: 2013-14
- Herts Senior Cup: 2012–13, 2014–15

Wealdstone

- National League South: 2019–20

Barnet

- National League: 2024–25
- Middlesex Senior Cup: 2021–22

Individual

- National League South Manager of the Year: 2019–20
- National League Manager of the Year: 2024–25
