= Lester Finch =

English football player and manager

Personal information
- Full name: Lester Charles Finch
- Date of birth: 26 August 1909
- Place of birth: Barnet, England
- Date of death: 20 November 1995 (aged 86)
- Place of death: Barnet, England

Senior career*
| Years | Team | Apps | (Gls) |
- Hadley
| 1928–1953 | Barnet | 476 | (226) |

International career
| 1936 | Great Britain | 2 | (1) |

Managerial career
- 1945–1951: Barnet
- 1951–1954: Barnet
- * Club domestic league appearances and goals

Lester Charles Finch (26 August 1909 – 20 November 1995) was an English football player and manager, best known for his long association with Barnet, and for representing Great Britain at the 1936 Summer Olympics. He started his career at Hadley before moving to local rivals Barnet.

He also represented England in 1941 during a match against Wales, but he was not awarded a cap as the game was classified as a Wartime international match.
