= List of Barnet F.C. seasons =

This is a list of seasons played by Barnet Football Club in English football, from 1888, when the club first entered the FA Cup, to the most recent completed season. Barnet Football Club were formed in 1888, having formerly been known as New Barnet FC (1885–1888) and Woodville FC (1882–1885).

This list details the club's achievements in all competitions, and the top scorers for each season.

== Seasons ==
Season	League record									FA Cup	League Cup	FA Trophy	Other	Top scorer(s)	
Season	Div	Pos	P	W	D	L	F	A	Pts	FA Cup	League Cup	FA Trophy	Other	Name(s)	Goals
1888–89	NLL														
1889–90	NLL														
1890–91	NLL														
1891–92	NLL														
1892–93	NLL														
1893–94	NLL														
1894–95	NLL														
1895–96	NLL														
1896–97	NLL														
1897–98	LL2	1st													
1898–99	LL1	3rd													
1899–1900	LL1	9th													
1900–01	LL1														
1901–02	LL1														
1902–03	LL1														
1903–04	LL1														
1904–05	LL1														
1905–06	LL1														
Merged with Alston Works to become Barnet Alston FC
1906–07	LL1	1st													
1907–08	LL1														
1908–09	LL1														
1909–10	LL1														
1910–11	LL1														
1911–12	LL1														
Merged with The Avenue to become Barnet and Alston FC
1912–13	AL	2nd	16	9	3	4	36	17	21						
1913–14	AL	6th	22	9	4	9	32	28	22				FA Amateur Cup; QF		
1914–19	No competitive football was played between 1915 and 1919 due to World War I														
Merged with The Avenue to become Barnet and Alston FC
1919–20	AL	3rd	22	11	4	7	53	31	26						
1920–21	AL	6th	22	11	2	9	49	35	24						
1921–22	AL	12th	26	6	8	12	29	45	20						
1922–23	AL	6th	24	11	5	8	43	40	27						
1923–24	AL	4th	24	11	6	7	48	29	28						
1924–25	AL	6th	26	10	7	9	35	38	27				FA Amateur Cup; QF		
1925–26	AL	6th	26	12	4	10	74	57	28	R1					
1926–27	AL	7th	26	10	6	10	48	40	26	R1					
1927–28	AL	8th	26	11	5	10	68	63	27				FA Amateur Cup; QF		
1928–29	AL	7th	26	12	3	11	67	55	27						
1929–30	AL	2nd	26	17	3	6	75	35	37						31
1930–31	AL	1st	26	22	2	2	103	30	46						
1931–32	AL	1st	26	17	5	4	90	56	39				FA Amateur Cup; QF		
1932–33	AL	3rd	26	15	4	7	74	48	34	R1			FA Amateur Cup; QF		
1933–34	AL	5th	26	13	2	11	66	55	28	R1			FA Amateur Cup; SF		
1934–35	AL	10th	26	9	3	14	41	53	21						
1935–36	AL	12th	26	15	6	3	17	83	15						
1936–37	AL	6th	26	11	3	12	66	82	25						
1937–38	AL	2nd	26	19	8	15	72	65	33				FA Amateur Cup; SF		
1938–39	AL	5th	26	10	5	11	62	68	25						
No competitive football was played between 1939 and 1945 due to World War II
1945–46	AL	8th	26	10	5	11	73	70	25	R1			FA Amateur Cup; W		
1946–47	AL	1st	26	15	4	7	88	45	34	R2			FA Amateur Cup; SF		
1947–48	AL	1st	26	18	2	6	86	38	38	Q4			FA Amateur Cup; RU		
1948–49	AL	9th	26	10	3	13	46	53	23	R1					
1949–50	AL	8th	26	10	2	14	53	56	22	Q4					
1950–51	AL	8th	30	13	3	14	82	69	29	P			FA Amateur Cup; QF		
1951–52	AL	12th	7	8	15	21	53	72	22	Q1			FA Amateur Cup; SF		
1952–53	AL	9th	26	10	3	13	39	46	23	Q1					
1953–54	AL	13th	26	8	4	14	36	54	20	P					
1954–55	AL	11th	26	6	11	9	39	48	23	R1					
1955–56	AL	7th	28	11	6	11	53	58	28	Q1					
1956–57	AL	15th	28	4	7	17	41	79	15	Q1					
1957–58	AL	4th	30	16	5	9	78	52	37	P			FA Amateur Cup; SF		
1958–59	AL	1st	30	20	4	6	85	44	44	Q1			FA Amateur Cup; RU		
1959–60	AL	2nd	30	17	9	4	79	35	43	R1					
1960–61	AL	3rd	30	17	5	8	69	43	39	Q2					
1961–62	AL	2nd	30	23	3	4	85	30	49	R1					
1962–63	AL	2nd	30	22	3	5	90	39	47	Q2					
1963–64	AL	1st	26	17	4	5	82	34	38	R1			FA Amateur Cup; SF		
1964–65	AL	1st	30	23	4	3	107	29	50	R3					
1965–66	SL1	1st	46	30	9	7	114	49	69	R1	Southern League Cup; R3		London Challenge Cup; R1		
1966–67	SLP	5th	42	18	13	11	86	66	49	Q4	Southern League Cup; RU		London Challenge Cup; SF		
1967–68	SPL	7th	42	20	8	14	81	71	48	R1	Southern League Cup; R2		London Challenge Cup; R1		
1968–69	SLP	12th	42	15	10	17	72	66	40	R1	Southern League Cup; R2		London Challenge Cup; R2		
1969–70	SLP	7th	42	16	15	11	71	54	47	R2	Southern League Cup; R3		SF		
1970–71	SLP	6th	42	18	14	10	69	49	50	R3	Southern League Cup; R1	R1	London Challenge Cup; R2		
1971–72	SLP	4th	42	21	7	14	80	57	49	R2	Southern League Cup; W	F	London Challenge Cup; R1		
1972–73	SLP	13th	42	15	11	16	60	59	41	R3	Southern League Cup; R1	R1	London Challenge Cup; R1		
1973–74	SLP	8th	42	18	9	15	55	46	45	Q4	Southern League Cup; R4	R1	London Challenge Cup; P		
1974–75	SLP	21st	42	10	9	23	44	76	29	Q4	Southern League Cup; R1	Q3	London Senior Cup; R4		
1975–76	SL1(N)	9th	42	15	12	15	56	57	42	Q1	Southern League Cup; R1	Q3	London Senior Cup; R2		
1976–77	SL1(S)	1st	34	23	8	3	65	25	54	Q3	Southern League Cup; R4	R1	Herts Senior Cup; R2		
1977–78	SLP	7th	42	18	11	13	63	58	47	R1	Southern League Cup; R1	Q1	Herts Senior Cup; R3		
1978–79	SLP	13th	42	16	10	16	52	64	42	R1	Southern League Cup; R1	Q1	Herts Senior Cup; R3		
1979–80	AP	17th	38	10	10	18	32	48	30	Q4	Alliance Premier League Cup; SF	R3	Herts Senior Cup; W		
1980–81	AP	17th	38	12	7	19	39	64	31	R2	Alliance Premier League Cup; R3	Q3	Herts Senior Cup; RU		
1981–82	AP	18th	42	9	14	19	36	52	41	R3	Alliance Premier League Cup; R1	Q3	Herts Senior Cup; R3		
1982–83	AP	15th	42	16	3	23	55	78	51	R1	Alliance Premier League Cup; R3	R2	London Senior Cup; R1		
1983–84	AP	9th	42	16	10	16	55	58	49	R1	Alliance Premier League Cup; RU	QF	London Senior Cup; R2		
1984–85	AP	15th	42	15	11	16	59	52	47	R1	Alliance Premier League Cup; R2	R3	Herts Senior Cup; RU		
1985–86	AP	14th	42	13	11	18	66	76	44	Q4	Alliance Premier League Cup; RU	R1	Herts Senior Cup; W		
1986–87	CON	2nd	42	25	10	7	86	39	85	Q1	GMA Cup; R3	QF	Herts Senior Cup; R1		
1987–88	CON	2nd	42	23	11	8	93	45	80	R1	GMA Cup; R3	R2	Herts Senior Cup; R1		
1988–89	CON	8th	40	18	7	15	64	69	61	Q3	Clubcall Cup; W	R1	Herts Senior Cup; R3		
1989–90	CON	2nd	42	26	7	9	81	41	85	R1	Bob Lord Trophy; R3	R1	Herts Senior Cup; SF		
1990–91	CON	1st	42	26	9	7	103	52	87	R3	Bob Lord Trophy; R1	R1	Herts Senior Cup; W		
1991–92	Div 4	7th	42	21	6	15	81	61	69	R3	R1		Football League Trophy; R2		
1992–93	Div 3	3rd	42	23	10	9	66	48	79	R1	R1		Football League Trophy; R1		
1993–94	Div 2	24th	46	5	13	28	41	86	28	R3	R2		Football League Trophy; P		
1994–95	Div 3	11th	42	15	11	16	56	63	56	R1	R2		Football League Trophy; P		
1995–96	Div 3	9th	46	18	16	12	65	45	70	R1	R1		Football League Trophy; P		
1996–97	Div 3	15th	46	14	16	16	46	51	58	R2	R2		Football League Trophy; R2		
1997–98	Div 3	7th	46	19	13	14	61	51	70	R1	R2		Football League Trophy; R1		
1998–99	Div 3	16th	46	14	13	19	54	71	55	R1	R1		Football League Trophy; R1		
1999–2000	Div 3	6th	46	21	12	13	59	53	75	R1	R1		Football League Trophy; R2		
2000–01	Div 3	24th	46	12	9	25	67	81	45	R2	R1		Football League Trophy; R3		
2001–02	CON	5th	42	19	10	13	64	48	67	R1	Football League Trophy; SF(S)		Herts Senior Cup; R2		
2002–03	CON	11th	42	13	14	15	65	68	53	Q4		R3			
2003–04	CON	4th	42	19	14	9	60	46	71	R2		R3	Football League Trophy; R1		
2004–05	CON	1st	42	26	8	8	90	44	86	R1		R4	Football League Trophy; R2		
2005–06	League 2	18th	46	12	18	16	44	57	54	R1	R3		Football League Trophy; R2		
2006–07	League 2	14th	46	16	11	19	55	70	59	R4	R2		Football League Trophy; R2		
2007–08	League 2	12th	46	16	12	18	56	63	60	R4	R1		Football League Trophy; R2		
2008–09	League 2	17th	46	11	15	20	56	74	48	R1	R1		Football League Trophy; R1		
2009–10	League 2	21st	46	12	12	22	47	63	48	R2	R1		Football League Trophy; R2	John O'Flynn	16
2010–11	League 2	22nd	46	12	12	22	48	77	48	R1	R1		Football League Trophy; R1	Izale Mcleod	14
2011–12	League 2	22nd	46	12	10	24	52	79	46	R2	R2		Football League Trophy; FS	Izale Mcleod	18
2012–13	League 2	23rd	46	13	12	21	47	59	51	R1	R1		Football League Trophy; R1	Jake Hyde	14
2013–14	CON	8th	46	19	13	14	58	53	70	R1		R2		Jake Hyde	12
2014–15	CON	1st	46	28	8	10	94	46	92	R1		R2		John Akinde	33
2015–16	League 2	15th	46	17	11	18	67	68	62	R2	R2		Football League Trophy; R1	John Akinde	24
2016–17	League 2	15th	46	14	15	17	57	64	57	R1	R1		EFL Trophy; R1	John Akinde	26
2017–18	League 2	23rd	46	12	10	24	46	65	46	R1	R2		EFL Trophy; R2	Shaq Coulthirst	12
2018–19	CON	12th	46	16	12	18	45	50	60	R4		R4 / QF	Middlesex Senior Cup; SF		
2019–20	CON	7th	35	14	12	9	52	42	54	R1		R4	Middlesex Senior Cup; 2R	Simeon Akinola	17
2020–21	CON	22nd	42	8	7	27	37	88	31	R2		R3		Michael Petrasso	10
2021–22	CON	18th	44	13	11	20	59	89	50	Q4		R3		Adam Marriott	17
2022–23	CON	5th	46	21	11	14	75	67	74	R2		SF		Nicke Kabamba	19
2023–24	CON	2nd	46	26	8	12	91	60	86	R2		QF		Nicke Kabamba	25
2024–25	CON	1st	46	31	9	6	97	38	102	R1		R4		Callum Stead	18
2025-26	League 2	8th	46	21	13	12	70	53	76	R1	PR		EFL Trophy R1	Callum Stead	13

== Key ==
Champions Runners-up Promoted Relegated

League results

- Div = Division
- Pos = Final position
- P = Games played
- W = Games won
- D = Games drawn
- L = Games lost
- F = Goals for
- A = Goals against
- Pts = Points

Divisions

- SLP = Southern Football League Premier Division
- SL1 = Southern Football League Division One
- AL = Athenian League
- Div 3 = Football League Third Division
- Div 4 = Football League Fourth Division
- n/a = Not applicable

Cup results

- P = Premliminary round
- Q = Qualifying round
- Q1 = Qualifying round 1
- Q2 = Qualifying round 2
- Q3 = Qualifying round 3
- Q4 = Qualifying round 4
- Q5 = Qualifying round 5
- R1 = Round 1
- R2 = Round 2
- R3 = Round 3
- R4 = Round 4
- R5 = Round 5
- QF = Quarter-finals
- SF = Semi-finals
- RU = Runners-up
- W = Winners
- GS = Group stage
- L16 = Last 16
- FS = Final (South)
- PR = Preliminary Round
