= Matthew Cox (footballer) =

English footballer (born 2003)

Personal information
- Full name: Matthew Aidan Cox
- Date of birth: 2 May 2003 (age 23)
- Place of birth: Sutton, England
- Height: 1.82 m (6 ft 0 in)
- Position: Goalkeeper

Team information
- Current team: Barnet (on loan from Brentford)
- Number: 13

Youth career
- –2017: Chelsea
- 2017–2021: AFC Wimbledon
- 2021–2022: Brentford

Senior career*
Years	Team	Apps	(Gls)
2022–	Brentford	0	(0)
2023–2024	→ Bristol Rovers (loan)	28	(0)
2025	→ Crawley Town (loan)	3	(0)
2026	→ Shrewsbury Town (loan)	18	(0)
2026–	→ Barnet (loan)	7	(0)

International career
2020	England U17	2	(0)
2021–2022	England U19	10	(0)
2021–2023	England U20	7	(0)
Medal record
Men's football
Representing England
UEFA European Under-19 Championship
Winner	2022 Slovakia
- * Club domestic league appearances and goals as of 13:58, 24 September 2026 (UTC)

Matthew Aidan Cox (born 2 May 2003) is an English professional footballer who plays as a goalkeeper for EFL League Two club Barnet, on loan from Premier League club Brentford.

Cox is a product of the Chelsea and AFC Wimbledon academies and began his professional career with the latter club in 2020. He transferred to Brentford in 2021. Cox was capped by England at youth level.

== Club career ==
=== Youth years ===
A goalkeeper, Cox began his career in the Chelsea Academy at age eight and concerns over his height led to his release at age 14. He moved into the AFC Wimbledon academy and progressed to sign his first professional contract in on his 17th birthday in May 2020. Cox was an unused substitute with the first team on 18 occasions during the 2020–21 season. At youth level, Cox was a part of the Dons' 2020–21 EFL Youth Alliance Cup-winning squad (scoring two goals during the campaign) and he was recognised for his football and academic progress by the LFE in November 2020. Cox departed Plough Lane in July 2021.

=== Brentford ===
==== 2021–22 season ====
On 22 July 2021, Cox transferred to the B team at Premier League club Brentford and signed three-year contract, with the option of a further year, for an undisclosed fee. He was called into the first team's St George's Park training camp during the 2021–22 pre-season and was assigned a first team squad number. As a result of a long-term injury suffered by first-choice goalkeeper David Raya in October 2021, Cox was promoted onto the first team substitutes' bench as backup for loanee Álvaro Fernández. Following the arrival of second loan goalkeeper Jonas Lössl in January 2022, Cox dropped back out of the matchday squad, but was frequently a member of the first team group. He made 18 B team appearances during the 2021–22 season. Cox was promoted into the first team squad in May 2022 and six weeks later he signed a new six-year contract, with a one-year option.

==== 2022–23 season ====
Beginning 2022–23 as third-choice goalkeeper behind David Raya and new signing Thomas Strakosha, ankle injuries suffered by Strakosha during the season saw Cox serve as Raya's backup for 24 matches. He also made seven appearances during the B team's 2022–23 Premier League Cup-winning campaign.

==== 2023–24 season and loan to Bristol Rovers ====
On 25 July 2023, Cox joined League One club Bristol Rovers on loan for the duration of the 2023–24 season. He began the season as first-choice goalkeeper, but following a dip in form, he was dropped in favour of Jed Ward in late January 2024. Cox made just one further appearance before the end of the season and finished a mid-table campaign on 34 appearances.

==== 2024–25 season and loan to Crawley Town ====
During the first half of the 2024–25 season, Cox served as third-choice goalkeeper behind Mark Flekken and Hákon Valdimarsson and was an unused substitute during two EFL Cup matches. On 28 January 2025, he joined League One club Crawley Town on loan until the end of the 2024–25 season. Cox went straight into the starting lineup and suffered a torn hamstring during his third appearance, which necessitated his return to Brentford for treatment. He did not appear again before the end of the League One season, but returned to match play with Brentford B on 19 May 2025.

==== 2025–26 season and loan to Shrewsbury Town ====
Behind new signing Caoimhín Kelleher and Hákon Valdimarsson in the pecking order, Cox failed to win a call into a matchday squad during the first half of the 2025–26 season. On 15 January 2026, he joined League Two club Shrewsbury Town on loan until the end of the season. Cox made 18 appearances during his spell and was voted the club's Young Player of the Year.

==== 2026–27 season and loan to Barnet ====
On 25 July 2026, Cox joined League Two club Barnet on loan for the duration of the 2026–27 season.

== International career ==
Cox was capped twice by England at U17 level in February 2020. He was called into one U18 and two U19 training camps during the 2020–21 season and made his U19 debut as a half time substitute during a 2–0 friendly win over Italy on 2 September 2021. One month later, Cox won his maiden call into the U20 squad for a pair of friendlies and made his debut as a late substitute for James Trafford in a 5–0 win over the Czech Republic in the second match.

Returning to the U19 team for the remainder of the 2021–22 season, Cox was a part of the squad which qualified for the 2022 UEFA European U19 Championship. He was named in the Finals squad and started in four of the team's five matches during its victorious campaign. Cox's performances were recognised with a place in the Team of the Tournament. Cox was a member of England's 2023 U20 World Cup squad and made four appearances prior to the team's round-of-16 exit.

Cox was called into the U21 squad for 2025 European U21 Championship qualifiers on three occasions during the 2023–24 season and he was an unused substitute during four matches.

== Style of play ==
In July 2022, Brentford head coach Thomas Frank stated that Cox "has all the attributes a modern goalkeeper needs. He has very good positioning when coming for crosses and is a great shot stopper and with the ball at his feet. He has attributes like a hunger to acquire new tools in every training session, a mature personality and outstanding learning skills".

== Personal life ==
Prior to switching to football, Cox played youth rugby union for Cobham. His father is a rugby union coach and his sister Katie is a goalkeeper in the Chelsea Women youth system. As of 2021, Cox was living in Chessington.

== Career statistics ==
As of match played 19 September 2026

Appearances and goals by club, season and competition
Club	Season	League			FA Cup		EFL Cup		Other		Total	
Club	Season	Division	Apps	Goals	Apps	Goals	Apps	Goals	Apps	Goals	Apps	Goals
AFC Wimbledon	2020–21	League One	0	0	0	0	0	0	0	0	0	0
Brentford	2021–22	Premier League	0	0	0	0	0	0	―		0	0
Brentford	2022–23	Premier League	0	0	0	0	0	0	―		0	0
Brentford	2024–25	Premier League	0	0	0	0	0	0	―		0	0
Brentford	Total		0	0	0	0	0	0	―		0	0
Bristol Rovers (loan)	2023–24	League One	28	0	4	0	1	0	1 (Note: Appearance in EFL Trophy)	0	34	0
Crawley Town (loan)	2024–25	League One	3	0	―		―		―		3	0
Shrewsbury Town (loan)	2025–26	League Two	18	0	―		―		―		18	0
Barnet (loan)	2026–27	League Two	7	0	0	0	1	0	0	0	8	0
Career total			56	0	4	0	2	0	1	0	63	0

== Honours ==
England U19

- UEFA European U19 Championship: 2022

Brentford B

- Premier League Cup: 2022–23

Individual

- UEFA European U19 Championship Team of the Tournament: 2022
- Shrewsbury Town Young Player of the Year: 2025–26
