= Ajayi =

- Gender: Male
- Language: Yoruba

Origin
- Origin: Yorubaland
- Meaning: A child born face upwards (i.e. the occiput posterior position)
- Region of origin: Yorubaland [Nigeria, Benin, Togo]

Ajayi audio is both a surname and a given name of Yoruba origin which means "a child born face upwards" (i.e. the occiput posterior position).

== Notable people with the name include ==
=== Surname ===
- Adeola Ajayi, Nigerian intelligence officer
- Damola Ajayi (born 2005), English footballer
- Florence Ajayi (born 1977), Nigerian footballer
- GOK Ajayi (1931–2014), Nigerian lawyer, solicitor, and judge
- Goodness Ohiremen Ajayi (born 1994), Nigerian footballer
- J. F. Ade Ajayi (1929–2014), Nigerian historian
- Jay Ajayi (born 1993), American football player
- Joseph Olatunji Ajayi, Nigerian senator
- Kunle Ajayi (born 1964), Nigerian gospel singer and musician
- Samuel Ajayi (born 1984), Nigerian footballer
- Semi Ajayi (born 1993), English footballer
- Tolu Ajayi (born 1946), Nigerian poet and writer

=== Given name ===
- Ajayi Agbebaku (born 1955), Nigerian triple jumper
- Samuel Ajayi Crowther, (1809–1891) Nigerian clergy

=== Fictional ===
- Nathan Ajayi, Art teacher in Heartstopper
