= Zac Williams (Welsh footballer) =

Welsh footballer (born 2004)

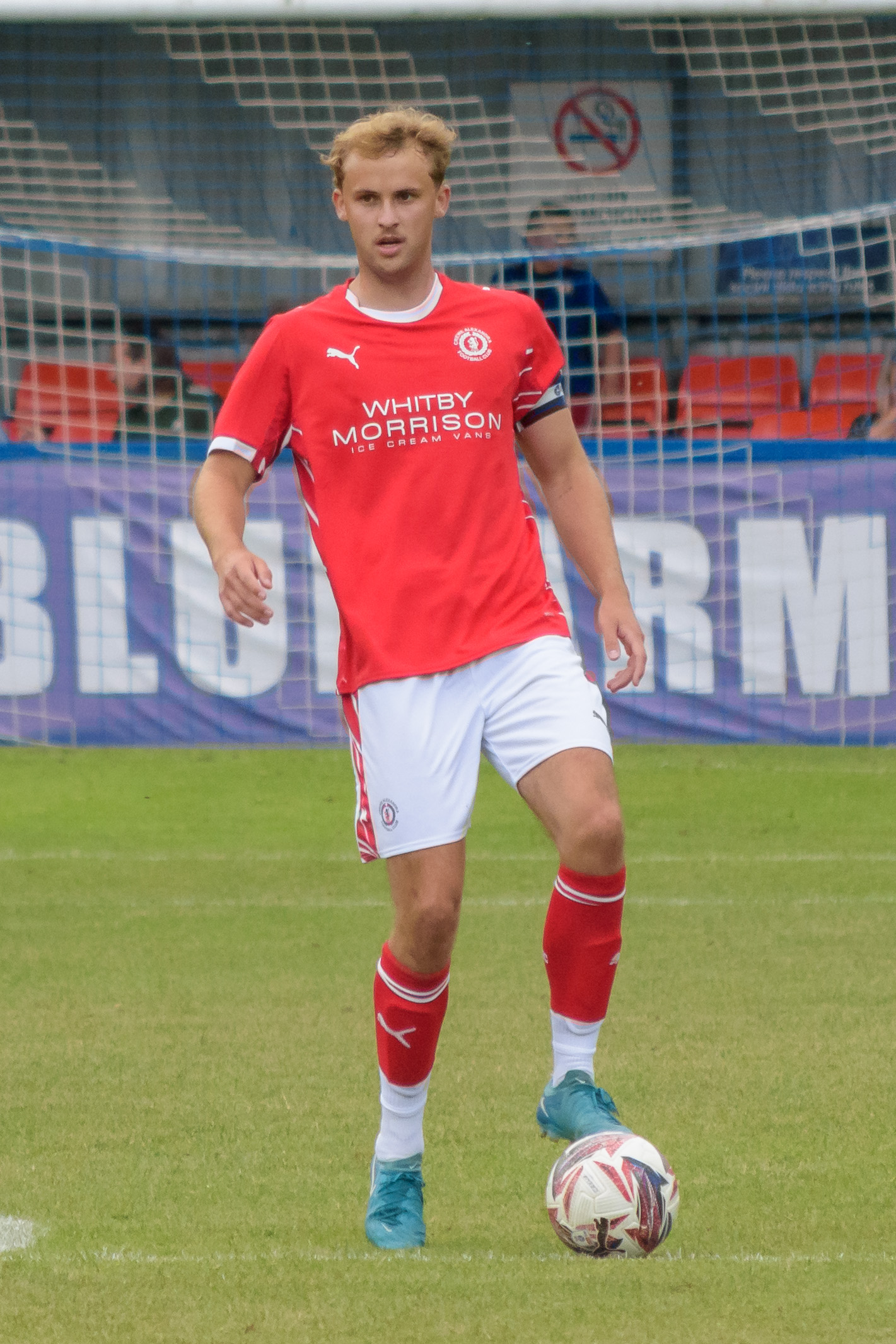
- Williams playing for Crewe Alexandra in 2025

Personal information
- Full name: Michael Issac Williams
- Date of birth: 27 March 2004 (age 22)
- Place of birth: Rhyl, Wales
- Height: 6 ft 0 in (1.82 m)
- Position: Defender

Team information
- Current team: Barnet
- Number: 6

Youth career
- –2021: Crewe Alexandra

Senior career*
Years	Team	Apps	(Gls)
2021–2026	Crewe Alexandra	110	(3)
2025–2026	→ Kilmarnock (loan)	7	(0)
2026–	Barnet	7	(2)

International career^{‡}
2021	Wales U18	2	(0)
2021–2022	Wales U19	5	(1)
2025–	Wales U21	2	(0)
- * Club domestic league appearances and goals as of 20:50, 10 October 2026 (UTC) ‡ National team caps and goals as of 08:56, 23 March 2025 (UTC)

Michael Isaac "Zac" Williams (born 27 March 2004) is a Welsh professional footballer who plays as a defender for EFL League Two club Barnet. He is a Wales Under-21 International.

== Club career ==
=== Crewe Alexandra ===
He made his Crewe debut, aged 17, on 9 November 2021 in an EFL Trophy group game against Wolverhampton Wanderers' under-21s at Gresty Road, before making his league debut in the following game, a 2–0 defeat at Bolton Wanderers. He made his first start in Crewe's next game, helping the side to a 2–0 win over Gillingham at Gresty Road on 20 November 2021, and then enjoyed a run of games as one of Crewe's first choice centre-backs until falling ill in January 2022. He returned to first-team action, coming on as a half-time substitute for Travis Johnson against Portsmouth at Gresty Road, on 8 March 2022.

In May 2022, Williams signed a new contract at Crewe. After 19 first-team appearances the following season, Williams suffered a torn hamstring which was initially thought likely to rule him out of action for the remainder of the season. However, he returned to the first team on 29 April 2023, making a substitute appearance in Crewe's 2–1 win over Swindon Town at Gresty Road. Williams scored his first Crewe goal, in a 2–2 draw against Swindon at the County Ground, on 12 August 2023.

In early 2024, Williams missed a series of games after incurring an ankle injury which required prolonged treatment. He returned to regular training at the end of February 2024. In May 2024, Crewe triggered a clause for an extension in Williams' contract,

In July 2025 Crewe offered Williams a new contract, which he did not immediately accept. In August 2025 he agreed a new deal with Crewe but was immediately loaned to Kilmarnock.

==== Kilmarnock (loan) ====
On 12 August 2025, Williams joined Scottish Premiership Kilmarnock on loan for the 2025-26 season. He made his debut for Kilmarnock on 14 September 2025 in the 2–1 Scottish Premiership defeat to Celtic.

On 13 May 2026, Crewe said he would be released in the summer when his contract expired.

=== Barnet ===
On 2 June 2026, Barnet announced that they had signed Williams ahead of the 2026-27 season.

== International career ==
After winning caps at under-15 and under-16, captaining the team for the latter, he played for the Wales under-18s in March 2021 against England before winning a second cap against the same opposition in September of the same year.

Williams was called up to the Wales under-19s squad for the 2022 UEFA European Under-19 Championship qualifiers against Georgia, Norway and Kosovo, and made appearances against the latter two in October 2021. He earned three further under-19 caps, playing as captain against Hungary and Republic of Ireland, and, after coming on as a second-half substitute, scoring against Gibraltar, in 2023 UEFA European Under-19 Championship qualifiers on 21, 24 and 27 September 2022 respectively.

== Career statistics ==
As of match played 10 October 2026

Club	Season	Division	League		National cup (Note: Includes FA Cup, Scottish Cup)		League cup (Note: Includes EFL Cup, Scottish League Cup)		Other		Total	
Club	Season	Division	Apps	Goals	Apps	Goals	Apps	Goals	Apps	Goals	Apps	Goals
Crewe Alexandra	2021–22	League One	19	0	0	0	0	0	1 (Note: Appearance(s) in EFL Trophy)	0	20	0
Crewe Alexandra	2022–23	League Two	18	0	1	0	1	0	2	0	22	0
Crewe Alexandra	2023–24	League Two	32	2	1	0	2	0	2 (Note: One appearance in EFL Trophy, one League 2 play-off appearance)	0	37	2
Crewe Alexandra	2024–25	League Two	41	1	1	0	1	0	2	0	45	1
Crewe Alexandra	2025–26	League Two	0	0	0	0	0	0	0	0	0	0
Crewe Alexandra	Total		113	3	3	0	4	0	7	0	124	3
Kilmarnock (loan)	2025–26	Scottish Premiership	7	0	0	0	1	0	0	0	8	0
Barnet	2026–27	League Two	7	2	0	0	1	0	2	0	10	2
Career total			127	5	3	0	6	0	9	0	142	5
