= Hamadi Ayari =

French footballer (born 1991)

Personal information
- Date of birth: 8 January 1991 (age 35)
- Place of birth: La Tronche, France
- Height: 1.78 m (5 ft 10 in)
- Position: Midfielder

Youth career
- 2006–2010: Grenoble

Senior career*
Years	Team	Apps	(Gls)
2010–2011	Grenoble	19	(0)
2011–2012	Metz	7	(0)
2012–2016	Grenoble	95	(7)
2016–2021	Sporting Club Lyon (Note: Sporting Club Lyon was called AS Lyon-Duchère until June 2020.)	129	(13)
2021–2022	Sedan	38	(3)
Total		288	(23)
- * Club domestic league appearances and goals as of 17 December 2022

Hamadi Ayari (born 8 January 1991) is a French former professional footballer who played as a midfielder.

== Career ==
Having joined Grenoble in 2006 Ayari was promoted to the senior team by former manager Yvon Pouliquen ahead of the 2009–10 season. He made his senior debut on 10 September 2010 in a Ligue 2 match against Istres appearing as a substitute in a 1–0 victory.

Released at the end of his contract with Grenoble, Ayari signed for Metz in September 2011, on an initial one-year deal, with the option to extend for two further years. He was released at the end of the season, when Metz were relegated to the Championnat National. Without a club, he returned to Grenoble to train. The club were now playing at the amateur level, so he had to wait until 1 October 2012 before signing a contract, due to regulations about reclassifying professional players as amateur.

After four seasons with Grenoble, Ayari signed with AS Lyon-Duchère in the Championnat National in June 2016, having been linked with various Ligue 2 sides. Lyon-Duchère rebranded as Sporting Club Lyon in June 2020.

On 22 June 2021, he agreed to join Sedan in Championnat National. On 17 December 2022, Ayari announced his retirement.
