= Barnet F.C. =

Football club in London, England

Barnet
- Full name: Barnet Football Club
- Nickname: The Bees
- Founded: 1888; 138 years ago
- Ground: The Hive Stadium
- Capacity: 6,500 (5,419 seated)
- Chairman: Anthony Kleanthous
- Head coach: Dean Brennan
- League: EFL League Two
- 2025–26: EFL League Two, 8th of 24
- Website: barnetfc.com
Home colours	Away colours

Barnet Football Club (/ˈbɑːrnɪt/) is a professional association football club based in the London Borough of Harrow, North West London. The team currently competes in EFL League Two, the fourth level of the English football league system.

The club was founded in Chipping Barnet in 1888. From 1907 until 2013 they played their home matches at Underhill Stadium, then moved to the new Hive Stadium, which is named in reference to the club's nickname of "The Bees".

Barnet became founder members of the North London League in 1892 and had success at a local level before ceasing to exist in 1902. Two other clubs, Barnet Avenue and Alston Works, merged and entered the Athenian League as Barnet and Alston in 1912, becoming simply Barnet F.C. seven years later. Barnet spent 53 years in the Athenian League, winning seven league titles and one FA Amateur Cup title, before turning semi-professional as they entered the Southern League in 1965. Crowned Division One champions in 1965–66, they went on to win the Southern League Cup in 1972 and the Division One South title in 1976–77. Barnet became founder members of the Alliance Premier League in 1979 and initially struggled, though finished as runners-up after the league was renamed the Conference in 1986–87.

Barnet were first promoted to the Football League in 1991 after manager Barry Fry led them to the Conference title in 1990–91. Promoted out of the Third Division in 1992–93, they spent just one season in the third tier before being relegated. They were relegated back to the Conference in 2001, but returned to the Football League four years later after winning the 2004–05 Conference National title. They then spent the next eight seasons in League Two before being relegated to the Conference once again in 2013. In 2015, they returned to the Football League for a third time, after winning the 2014–15 Conference Premier title, but were relegated once again in 2018.

Seven years later, they returned to League Two after winning the 2024–25 National League under manager Dean Brennan, achieving a club record 102 points.

== History ==
For a complete list of seasons, see List of Barnet F.C. seasons

Barnet's performance in the league since becoming a founder member of the Alliance Premier League in the 1979-80 season.

=== Early years (1888–1901) ===
Barnet FC were formed in 1888, having formerly been known as New Barnet FC (1885–88) and Woodville FC (1882–85). The club's origins are from ex-scholars of Cowley College and Lyonsdown Collegiate School. They were known as "The Hillmen" and played in New Barnet before moving to Ravenscroft Park in Queens Road in 1889. Initially they played friendly games before becoming inaugural members of the North London League in 1892–93. They went on to have success in the North Middlesex League Division II (1894–95 runners-up), Division I (1895–96 runners-up) and the Premier Division (1896–97 champions). Promoted to the London League Division II, Barnet became champions in 1897–98 and spent the following seasons in London League Division I before ceasing to exist in the 1901–02 season.

=== Barnet Avenue and Barnet Alston (1901–1919) ===
Two local clubs, Barnet Avenue FC (formed 1890) and Alston Works AFC (formed 1901) continued to attract support. Barnet Avenue renamed themselves Barnet FC in 1904 and as staunch believers in the amateur game they shunned the London Football Association in favour of the Amateur Football Association, which they joined in 1907 after winning the Chiswick League. Avenue played their home games initially at Hadley Green before moving to Queens Road.

Alston Works AFC, later Barnet Alston FC, were formed in 1901, and became champions of the London League in 1906–07. Formed from workers at Alston Works, a dental manufacturers, they were known as "The Dentals". Their club strip of amber and black is the basis of the current Barnet team strip. In 1907 they moved to the club's current ground at Underhill, Barnet Lane. Their first match was a 1–0 win over Crystal Palace on 14 September 1907. After merging with the Avenue team in 1912 they spearheaded the new Athenian League as Barnet and Alston FC. After the First World War in 1919 they became the third instance of Barnet FC. This team continues today.

=== Athenian League years (1912–1965) ===
For over 50 years Barnet FC competed in the Athenian League. They were inaugural members in 1912–13 they were league champions no fewer than seven times between 1919 and 1965 before turning fully professional in 1965.

During the 1920s Barnet consolidated their amateur status in the Athenian League under team secretary Tom Goss. He arranged for junior players from Tottenham Hotspur to play for the club including Taffy O'Callaghan, Willie Evans and Bill Whatley, all of whom eventually became internationals, between them gaining 17 Welsh caps.

The 1930–31 season saw Barnet gain their first Athenian League Championship to be repeated again the following season. Included in the team at that time were George Hughes and Fred Garrett, full backs; Reg Wright (England), centre-half; and Arthur Morris, Jack Richardson and a Barnet and England legend Lester Finch in the forward line.

In the two seasons after World War II, Barnet won the FA Amateur Cup (beating Bishop Auckland 3–2), the Athenian League Championship twice, and the London Senior Cup. The side included five internationals in Ted Bunker, George Wheeler, Dennis Kelleher, Ron Phipps and Lester Finch. In the 1958–59 season, their young team coached by George Wheeler, reached the FA Amateur Cup final for the third time, but were beaten 3–2 by Crook Town.

In October 1946, the first live televised football match was broadcast by the BBC from Underhill. Twenty minutes of the game against Wealdstone were televised in the first half and thirty five minutes of the second half before it became too dark. In 1947, Barnet FC played Sing Tao Sports Club, winners of the Hong Kong Football League at Underhill. They were the first Chinese club to ever play in the United Kingdom. Barnet won 5–3.

=== Non-League years (1965–1991) ===
Barnet reached the third round proper of the FA Cup for the first time on 9 January 1965, meeting the previous season's runner-up Preston North End at Underhill. 2–0 down inside the first 10 minutes, the second half saw Barnet, urged on by 10,500 spectators, level the score at 2–2, before a last minute own goal sent them out.

In 1965–66 Barnet turned semi-professional. Before the season commenced, manager Dexter Adams made two astute signings. He persuaded Les Eason, then 20 years of age, to join from Finchley and then acquired amateur international Barry King from Hitchin, who became the first player to sign professional forms for the club. The first game finished in Barnet's favour, a 10–1 win over Hinckley Athletic. Les Eason went on to score 31 goals in his first season as the club became champions of the Southern League Division I.

Promoted to the Southern League Premier for 1966–67 the club ended up 5th but had reached the Southern League Cup final only to lose to Guildford City over two legs. In 1969–70 the FA Trophy was introduced and Barnet reached the semi-final before losing to Macclesfield Town 0–1 at Stoke City's Victoria Ground. The club reached the third round of the FA Cup the following season, but lost 1–0 to Colchester United, who went on to knock out Leeds United in the fifth round. That year's cup run included a 6–1 first round win over then Fourth Division Newport County, equalling the competition's all-time record for a win by a non-league side over league opponents.

The 1971–72 season proved one of the most successful. Using just 15 players for 80 competitive matches Barnet reached Wembley in the FA Trophy, losing 3–0 to Stafford Rangers, and reached the final of the Southern League Cup, drawing 2–2 with Hereford on aggregate. The replay, played the next season, was a 2–2 draw but Barnet went on to win 7–6 on penalties. In 1972–73, Barnet put up a tremendous fight against Queens Park Rangers in the third round of the FA Cup. The match at Loftus Road ended 0–0 and the replay at Underhill drew in excess of 11,000 spectators. Rangers eventually won 3–0.

In 1975, Barnet were relegated back to the Southern League Division One North, after one season they switched to the Southern League Division One South which they won at the first attempt and returned to the Southern League Premier. It was during this period that many famous names played for the club including Jimmy Greaves, Marvin Hinton, Bob McNab, Terry Mancini and John Fairbrother. Jimmy Greaves, although playing in midfield, still ended the season as leading goal scorer with 27 goals.

By virtue of their Premier Division positions in seasons 1977–78 and 1978–79, Barnet were given a place in the newly formed Alliance Premier League. In the first three Alliance seasons, Barnet just avoided relegation, but in 1982–3 they finished 15th and a year later 9th. Then in 1984–85, when it looked like Barnet would face relegation, manager Barry Fry left to take charge at Maidstone United. The season was resurrected under the guidance of ex-player Roger Thompson, with the team losing only one of their remaining thirteen league games. They also managed to beat Wealdstone – fierce rivals at the time and about to win the non-league double – by seven goals to nil, thanks to a haul from Nicky Evans and a hat trick by Steve Mahoney.

In season 1985–86 they finished 14th but reached the final of the Bob Lord Challenge Trophy only to lose to old friends Stafford Rangers. Dom MacAllister replaced Roger Thompson and then in July 1986, Barry Fry returned, much to the delight of the supporters. He led Barnet to their best league position for many years finishing runners-up in the renamed Football Conference scoring 86 goals.

Despite turbulent times off the field, during season 1986–87 (the first season of automatic promotion to the Football League for Conference champions) the club maintained their scoring, again finishing runners-up, Scarborough taking the automatic position into the Fourth Division. Lincoln City came down but in 1987–88 they returned ahead of Barnet in the championship. 1988–89 was another indifferent season; at one time looking like relegation prospects, the team secured 8th place, in the process using no fewer than 47 players. They did however win the Clubcall Cup (League Cup), the final being played at Telford United's Bucks Head Ground, by beating Hyde United on penalties after a 3–3 draw. 1989–90 saw Barnet yet again finish runners-up in the Conference. This time it was Darlington that took the top spot.

A good run in the 1990–91 FA Cup culminated in a home defeat by Portsmouth in the third round. A win in the last game of the season against Fisher Athletic finally saw Barnet promoted to the Fourth Division of the Football League.

=== Football League (1991–2001) ===
Barnet joined the Fourth Division of the Football League on winning the Football Conference championship in 1991. Their early reputation was of playing fast, attacking football, a reputation only enhanced by their first-ever League match (which they lost 7–4 to Crewe Alexandra), and a 5–5 draw to Brentford in the League Cup in their next match. In their first season of League football, the club reached the promotion play-offs but lost to Blackpool in the semi-finals.

The 1992–93 season saw controversy at Underhill regarding club accounts and players' wages, resulting in some nationwide back page headlines. Barnet chairman Stan Flashman also brought his son, Mark, to the club as a reserve goalkeeper. In spite of the financial problems, Barnet finished third in the new Division Three and secured the final automatic promotion spot. Manager Barry Fry, however, left Barnet with a handful of games remaining and was replaced by his assistant Edwin Stein, who himself then left to join Fry in the summer at Southend United. Goalkeeper Gary Phillips took over as manager during a difficult summer in which Barnet marginally survived a vote of expulsion by a Football League EGM, and lost the vast majority of their promotion-winning side in a tribunal decision which nullified the players' contracts. Phillips cobbled together a squad from the few remaining players and free transfers. In January 1994, Phillips was assisted by former England goalkeeper Ray Clemence, but were still relegated from Division Two. In August 1994 Ray Clemence became sole manager for two seasons, with the club finishing 11th and then ninth in Division Three. At the start of the 1996–97 season, Ray Clemence left to become England goalkeeping coach, leaving Terry Bullivant in charge.

The following season saw Barnet slump to 15th place, their lowest Football League finish until that point, though Bullivant was still approached to take over as manager of Reading that summer. He accepted the job and John Still replaced him as manager. The following four seasons saw the club yo-yo in form, as they finished seventh and reached the play-offs in 1997–98, hit a new low of 16th place in 1998–99, and then finished sixth and qualified for the play-offs once more in 1999–2000. The 2000–01 season initially looked to be another solid campaign, with Barnet among the leading pack from early on. In November, however, Still changed roles to become the club's director of football and was succeeded as manager by Tony Cottee, an ambitious high-profile appointment which aimed to take the club forward. Despite a 7–0 victory over Blackpool in his first match in charge, the club won only five more games for the remainder of the season and finished in bottom place after failing to beat second-bottom Torquay United, returning to the Conference after exactly a decade. Still was reinstated as manager in the final stages of the season, but was ultimately unable to rescue the club.

=== Conference (2001–2005) ===
Still remained in charge for the club's return to the Conference, and with a good first half of the season it looked as if their stay would be a short one. However, a terrible run of form after Christmas 2001 saw the side crash to mid-table and led to Still's final departure from the club. He was replaced by Peter Shreeves, who only months before had been in charge of Division One side Sheffield Wednesday, and quickly turned Barnet's form around. With only the Conference champions going up in this season the prospect of promotion was already long-gone by the time Shreeves was appointed, but the fifth-place finish that they ultimately managed would be good enough for the play-offs introduced for the following season. However, Barnet did not maintain their momentum into 2002–03, and Shreeves was dismissed late in that season, with Barnet in the same mid-table position he had found them in. Martin Allen took over as manager and brought a turn-around in results, though it was again too late to mount a promotion challenge and they finished in 11th place. The 2003–04 season proved to be a much better campaign, and the club were challenging near the top of the table throughout the season, but Allen left to take over at fellow London club Brentford with only a couple of months of the campaign left.

Former Stevenage Borough manager Paul Fairclough replaced Allen for the remainder of the 2003–04 season. The club's form stuttered, falling out of contention for automatic promotion and very nearly even the play-offs as well, but this time the club were able to rebound and secure a fourth-place finish, setting up a play-off semi final with the side directly above them, Shrewsbury Town. This was taken to penalties after a 2–2 aggregate score (Barnet won 2–1 at Underhill, Shrewsbury won 1–0 at Gay Meadow), with Shrewsbury winning 5–3 on penalties. The following season, 2004–05, with Fairclough at the helm, the Bees went one better than the previous season and were crowned Champions of the Conference Premier and regained their football league status, after amassing an impressive 86 points in the season, and scoring 90 goals with it. Barnet also finished 12 points ahead of their nearest rival, Hereford United. Giuliano Grazioli finished with 29 goals, and was also top scorer in the League.

=== Second Football League spell (2005–2013) ===
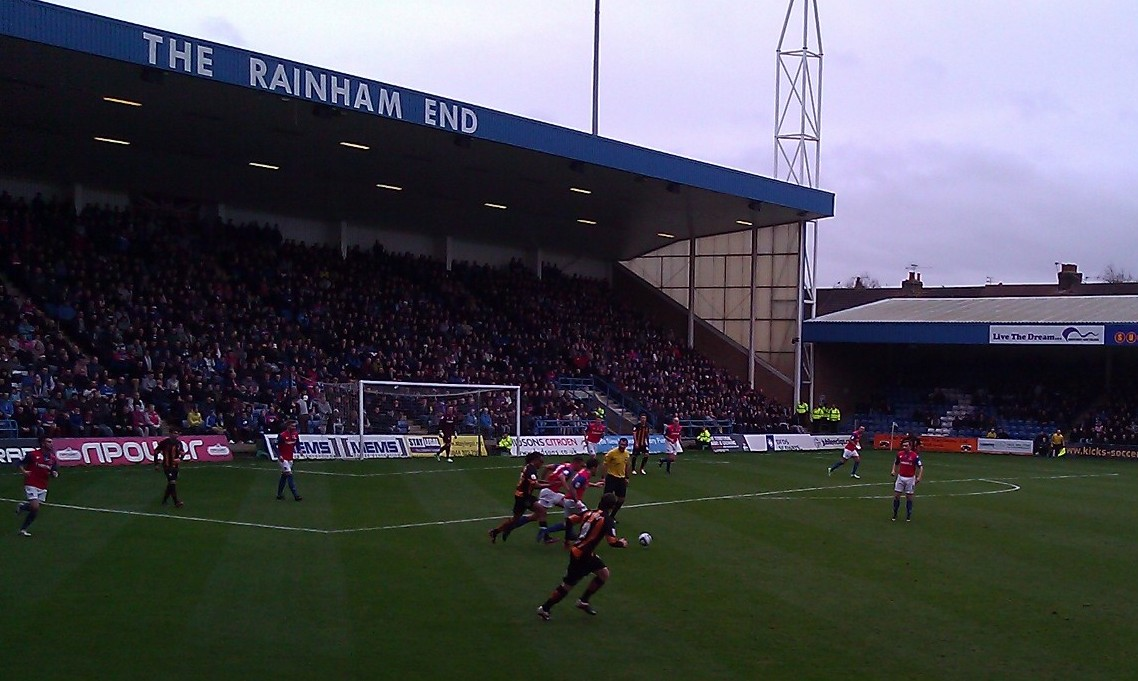
Barnet (in striped shirts) playing away to Gillingham in December 2012. Player-manager Edgar Davids is challenging the Gillingham player on the ball.

The 2005–06 season started with Barnet leading League Two after four games, but this form did not continue and the club finished the season five places and 5 points above the relegation zone, yet only 12 points out of the playoffs, with only 1 win in the first 12 games of 2006. In the League Cup the Bees drew a lucrative away tie against Manchester United in October 2005. 5,000 fans made the trip to Old Trafford to see Barnet lose 4–1, goalkeeper Ross Flitney being sent-off in the second minute. The 2006–07 season started poorly for Barnet, but a mid-season rally saw them finish the season in 14th place. A good run in the FA Cup also saw them reach the fourth round of that competition for the first time in their history, beating Championship side Colchester United 2–1 in the third round and Northampton Town 4–1 in the second round before losing 2–0 to Plymouth Argyle at home. 2007–08 saw another mid-table finish for Barnet; 12th with 60 points, and a second run to the Fourth round of the FA Cup, where they lost 1–0 to Bristol Rovers, with Jason Puncheon missing a penalty for the Bees.

The 2008–09 season started poorly, and by late September only the three teams that had been docked points prior to the start of the season had lower league positions. After a run of thirteen games without a win in any competition Paul Fairclough announced his resignation to take up a role as director and leaving the first team duties to his assistant Ian Hendon. Fairclough would take over one last game which resulted in a 2–0 win against another relegation threatened side AFC Bournemouth. Results improved, and before the end of the season Hendon was made permanent boss with a two-year contract. The Bees stayed in Football League Two for the following 2009–10 season, which started with four wins from their first six games. A poor run of form would follow, including a 13-game winless streak, and after five consecutive defeats left the Bees close to the relegation zone, Ian Hendon was sacked in April with two games of the season remaining. Paul Fairclough returned as caretaker manager for the last two games and guided the Bees to safety with a 1–0 win at home to Rochdale on the last day of the season.

On 1 June 2010, Mark Stimson was appointed as the new manager and after a poor start to the season was sacked on 1 January 2011. He was succeeded by the ever-present Paul Fairclough; however, he stepped down after only being able to secure three wins in 17 games. He was then succeeded by Martin Allen, who was asked to manage Barnet on a non-contract basis until the end of the season; however, after just 3 matches, he was offered a contract from Notts County and subsequently left for them. With just 5 games left of the season, assistant manager Giuliano Grazioli took over, having been appointed as Assistant manager by Martin Allen earlier. Grazioli was also able to bring in Lawrie Sanchez as an adviser. Grazioli took Barnet to the last day of the season 2 points behind Lincoln City in the relegation zone. Barnet were up against Port Vale in their final match on 7 May 2011 at Underhill and were able to win 1–0 following a penalty scored by Izale McLeod. Aldershot Town's 3–0 victory over Lincoln City meant Barnet finished a point above Lincoln City and the relegation zone. Pitch invasions followed as the club survived on the last day of the season again, as the day was regarded as the "great escape". Following the end of the season, Lawrie Sanchez was appointed as manager.

In the 2011–12 season, Lawrie Sanchez steered the side to 3rd from bottom with 3 games to go. He was replaced on 16 April by Martin Allen, who managed to keep Barnet up on the last day of the season following a 2–1 win over Burton Albion leaving Barnet two points above Hereford United and the relegation zone. This was the third consecutive year that Barnet had managed to secure their Football League survival on the last day.

Barnet's 2012–13 season started disappointingly, without a single win in August or September. On 11 October 2012, Barnet confirmed a huge coup in signing the former Barcelona and Ajax midfielder Edgar Davids as player and joint head coach alongside Mark Robson. In October Barnet recorded their first win of the season with a 4–0 result against Northampton Town. Near the end of December, Barnet announced that Robson's contract had been terminated, saying: "It was felt that clarification was required regarding the coaching responsibilities at the club and to this end it was agreed that Mark should leave with immediate effect." This left Davids with sole responsibility for the club. The team were then relegated back to the Conference on 27 April 2013, after finishing on 51 points (the highest ever obtained by a team relegated from League 2) and going down due to an inferior goal difference to that of Dagenham and Redbridge, after a 2–0 loss to Northampton.

=== Conference (2013–2015) ===
Barnet started the 2013–14 season in the Conference Premier. On 18 January 2014, head coach Edgar Davids resigned from his role by mutual consent. On 19 March 2014, Martin Allen was appointed head coach on a contract running until the end of the 2014–15 season, marking the start of his fourth spell as manager. At the end of the season, Barnet finished top of the Conference Premier and were promoted to League Two.

=== Third Football League spell (2015–2018) ===
In their first season back in the Football League, Martin Allen led the team to a 15th-place finish with a final end of season win away at Crawley Town with a finishing result of 3–0. On 1 December 2016 Allen resigned from his post at Barnet to take up the job at Eastleigh. Rossi Eames and Henry Newman were appointed joint interim head coach with Newman leaving three months later on 14 February 2017. This was followed by the appointment of Kevin Nugent who only lasted two months with one win in 11 games before being parting company with Barnet. This left Eames in the caretaker position of coach until the end of the season with Barnet finishing in 15th place two consecutive seasons. On 19 May 2017 he was then appointed permanent head coach setting a new record making Eames the youngest manager at the age of 32.

In November of the 2017–18 season saw Mark McGhee appointed as their new manager with Rossi Eames appointed head of player development. In January 2018 Barnet were sitting bottom of League Two and decided to move Mark McGhee to the Technical Director position and appoint Graham Westley first team coach. Into March and still sitting at the bottom of the table, Barnet decided to sack Graham Westley and reappoint Martin Allen for his fifth spell. It was also reported that Mark McGhee had left the club. Allen turned Barnet fortunes around with five wins out of the next eight matches leaving it to the last day of the season to determine their fate. Barnet won their final match against Chesterfield but with Morecambe drawing leaving both teams on the same number of points, but Barnet were subsequently relegated out of the league due to goal difference. It was confirmed on 10 May that Allen had, once again, left the club.

=== National League (2018–2025) ===
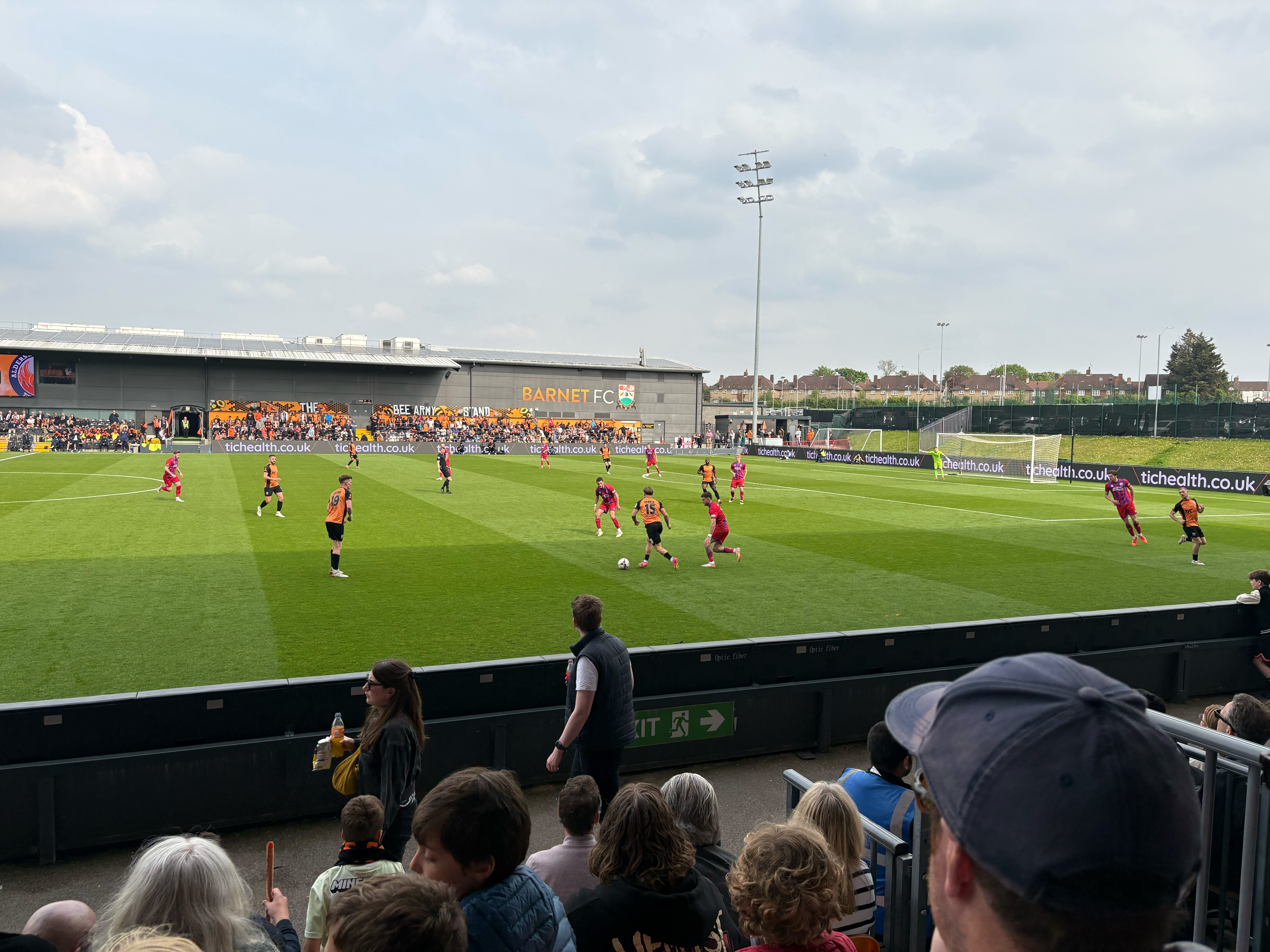
Barnet's final home game of the 2024–25 season against Aldershot where they secured the National League title.

Following the departure of Allen, Barnet re-appointed John Still as their manager for the 2018–19 National League season. On 28 December 2018, Still announced his retirement from management, two days after a 1–0 defeat to Boreham Wood, with the club 15th in the league. Assistant Manager Darren Currie took temporary charge before eventually taking the job on a permanent basis, leading the club to a 13th-placed finish. In the 2018–19 FA Cup, Barnet, despite their status as a fifth-tier team, managed to progress into the fourth round of the competition, winning against Bristol Rovers, Stockport County, and Sheffield United.

The 2020–21 season saw Barnet record their lowest league position for many years. They finished within the relegation zone of the National League, but were saved from dropping into the National League South due to the abandonment of the 2020–21 National League North and South mid-season (owing to the COVID-19 pandemic). The team's 2020–21 performance was greatly hampered by the club being badly affected by the pandemic during the first half of the season, and the closure of the club's EFL-funded football academy at the end of the previous season. In the 2022–23 season, they lost to Boreham Wood in the play-off quarter-finals after finishing 5th. The following season Barnet finished in second place to qualify for the play-offs again. In the semi-finals, they were defeated 4–0 by Solihull Moors at home.

The 2024–25 season saw the club promoted back to the Football League with a 4–0 victory over Aldershot Town securing the National League title in the penultimate match.

=== EFL League Two (2025–present) ===
In Barnet's first season back in the EFL they finished in 8th place.

== Stadiums ==
=== Underhill ===
Barnet's first stadium named Underhill was established in 1907 when the football club were named Barnet & Alston. This was arranged on 100-year lease with Barnet Council. The first ever game at the ground was against another London club, namely Crystal Palace, which ended 1–0 to Barnet. Over the years notable matches at Underhill included a game in 1952 against Wycombe Wanderers which had the highest recorded attendance of 11,026 spectators.

The stadium's capacity fluctuated over the years from all-standing to the addition of an all-seater mainstand in 1964 to a final capacity of 6,023.

With the lease ending in 2007 the Barnet chairman Tony Kleanthous extended the lease with the council for a further 5 years. But by December 2011 Kleanthous became increasingly frustrated with the lack of progress from the council to extend the original lease by another 125 years. With plans to build a new stadium on the site continually rejected Kleanthous started to look elsewhere to relocate Barnet, meaning the end of their stay at Underhill.

Barnet's final game at Underhill came on 20 April 2013 against Wycombe Wanderers, which they won 1–0 in front of 6,000 spectators.

In July 2012 Harrow Council agreed the development of a new stadium called The Hive Stadium at the Prince Edward Playing Fields which the club can use for a period of up to 10 years. In February 2013, Barnet's move to the new ground was ratified by The Football League.

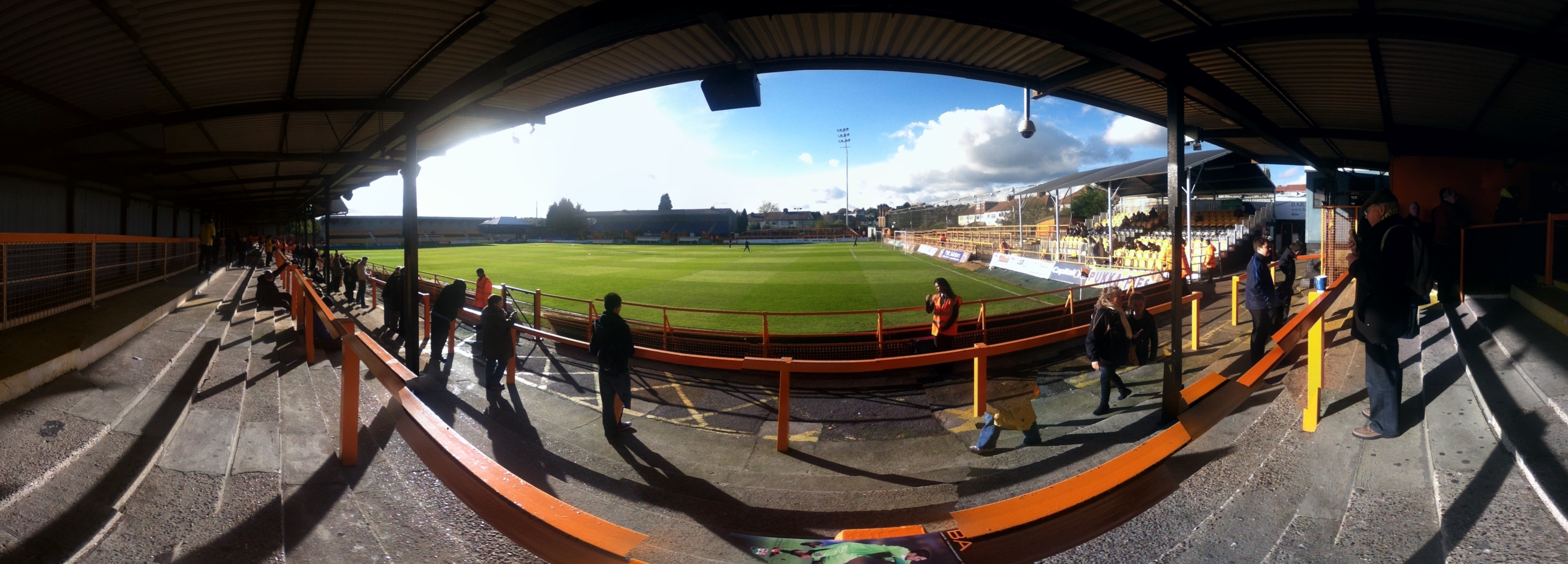
Underhill

=== Hive Stadium ===
On 1 August 2007, Barnet chairman Tony Kleanthous announced that he had acquired a 44-acre (180,000 m^{2}) site in Harrow. The deal would see Barnet contribute £6 million towards an £11 million development, which would include training facilities for Barnet's first, reserve and ladies teams, as well as a 5,000 stadium for nearby Wealdstone. The plan also provides for a second, smaller 'green' 1,000 capacity stadium, for ladies and youth football, as well as a centre of excellence and community use facilities.

After a quiet 10 months, an announcement was made on 23 May 2008, which confirmed the plans for the first phase of the development. Costing £3 million, the works included two full size FIFA approved 3rd Generation artificial pitches, senior and youth pitches, car and coach parking, changing facilities for 14 teams, as well as a reception and cafe area. The work would 'provide some of the best training and community use facilities in the country' ending Barnet's nomadic existence in search of areas in which to train. Work began in the Autumn of 2008, once the Football Foundation provided £1 million of funding. Harrow Borough Council also provided £750,000 towards the cost of the project.

Worryingly for Wealdstone supporters, the first phases of plans did not include any mention of providing the stadium initially proposed. Wealdstone made a statement after the first phase plans were announced, insisting that the intention still remains to play at PEPF, and that talks were ongoing, although any deal would have to be right for Wealdstone.

In April 2009, a delegation from the Barnet Football Club Supporters Association (BFCSA) visited the site and interviewed the man overseeing the construction and continued development, Paul Fairclough. A video made during the tour shows the work being carried out, throwing up some new, previously unknown information about the site, such as the construction of a swimming pool and Jacuzzi, and the fact that Highbury's floodlights were currently being stored there! The interview was particularly revealing, indicating that the development is in the first of four planned stages (suggesting a stadium for Wealdstone is still a possibility), that there were hopes to have the England senior team hold training camps there, and that the proposed centre of excellence would cost £250,000 per year to run. There was also some indication of how Barnet could financially exploit the site, and attain a degree of self-sufficiency, as they were in the process of doing a deal with an organisation to rent out the astro turf pitches for £30,000 for one year. In addition, up to £180,000 per year is available to Football League clubs to run their youth systems. In May 2009, it was reported that Harrow Borough and Wealdstone are in negotiation with Barnet to use the training facilities. The training ground is known as "The Hive" and was opened by Fabio Capello and Trevor Brooking on 15 December 2009. Since then, major teams visiting London, such as then-Premier League club Hull City, Italian side Parma, French side AS Monaco and the Egyptian, Brazilian, Chilean and German National Squads, have made use of the training facilities.

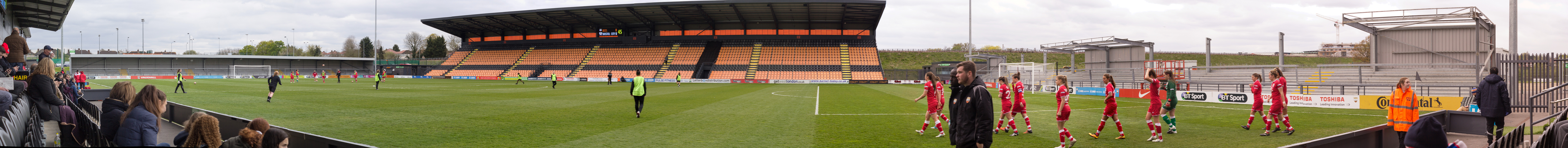
The Hive Stadium in April 2016

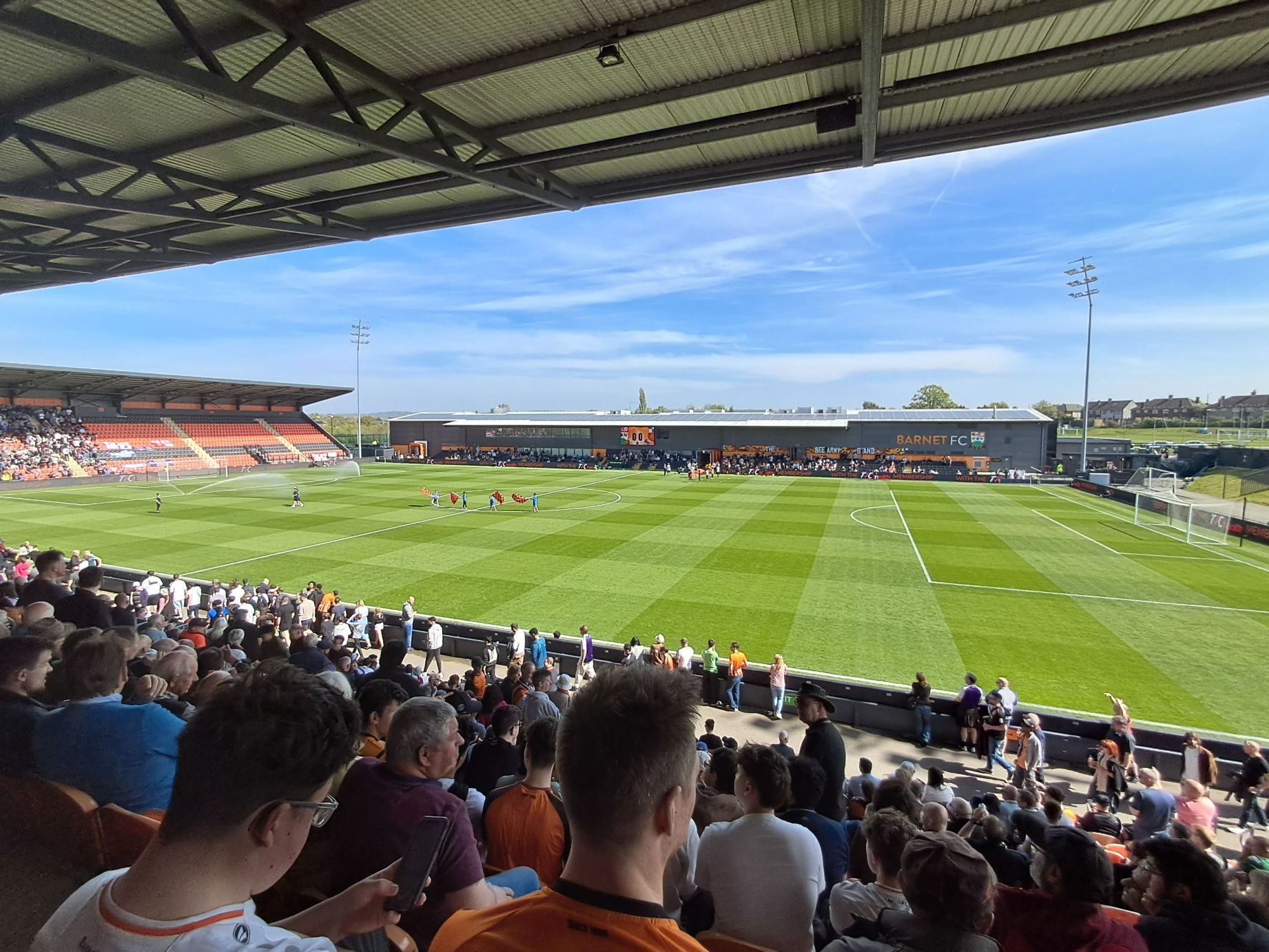
The Hive in 2025 showing the North Stand for away supporters

=== Proposed New Underhill stadium ===
In February 2024 Tony Kleanthous announced plans to move the club to a new ground built close to the old Underhill site, allowing the club to move back to its home borough. On 14 July 2025, Barnet Council rejected the club's request for planning permission, after council planning officers recommended that the loss of green belt land would outweigh the benefits to the area. Underhill ward's two local councillors, both Labour, were divided on the subject, with Tim Roberts in favour and Zahra Beg opposed. Barnet FC responded that it was "extremely disappointed" with the decision. As of October, the club is considering whether to place an appeal before the January 2026 deadline. A petition launched by supporters' group Bring Back Barnet gathered over 2,000 signatures.

== Club crest and nickname ==
The club's current crest was designed in the 1950s and contains the green hill of High Barnet and the red rose, white rose and crossed swords representing the 1471 Battle of Barnet, a pivotal battle in the Wars of the Roses. The badge was designed by Sidney Robert Price who was the chairman of the club at the time.

The club's nickname of "The Bees", reflected in their amber and black shirts, is likely to have come from the location of apiaries close to the Underhill ground in the early years of the 20th century. Coincidentally, this nickname is similar to those of two of Barnet's neighbours, Watford ("The Hornets") and Brentford (also "The Bees").

== Rivalries ==
Traditionally, the club's main local rivals were Enfield. The two clubs were amongst the biggest in Non-League during the 1980s and matches between them were fiercely contested. Enfield suffered numerous off-field problems and the original club has since ceased to exist and reformed as Enfield 1893 F.C. in 2007, suffering a split in the past in 2001 after the formation of the breakaway club Enfield Town. As such, the last clash with the original club was in 1991, in the FA Cup, a match which Barnet won 4–1.

Other local rivals include Stevenage, Wealdstone, Brentford and Boreham Wood. Barnet have also had a long-lasting friendly rivalry with their "big neighbours" Arsenal, with whom they regularly had pre-season friendlies for several seasons.

== Players ==
=== Squad ===
As of 15 October 2026

Note: Flags indicate national team as defined under FIFA eligibility rules; some limited exceptions apply. Players may hold more than one non-FIFA nationality.

No.	Pos.	Nation	Player
1	GK	ENG	Taye Ashby-Hammond
3	DF	ENG	Romoney Crichlow
4	DF	ENG	Danny Collinge (captain)
5	DF	ENG	Adam Senior
6	DF	WAL	Zac Williams
7	MF	ENG	Tom Knowles
8	MF	ENG	Charlie Lakin
9	FW	ENG	Jack Maskell
10	MF	NGR	Nnamdi Ofoborh
11	MF	SLE	Idris Kanu
13	GK	ENG	Matthew Cox (on loan from Brentford)
14	MF	MSR	Brandon Comley
17	FW	ENG	Damola Ajayi (on loan from Tottenham Hotspur)
18	DF	ENG	Kane Smith

No.	Pos.	Nation	Player
20	FW	ENG	Kabongo Tshimanga
22	MF	IRL	Oisin Gallagher (on loan from Lincoln City)
23	MF	ENG	Jake Reeves (on loan from AFC Wimbledon)
25	DF	CRO	Nikola Tavares
30	DF	ENG	Myles Kenlock
31	DF	NED	Noye Richard
32	MF	ENG	Isiah Noel-Williams
35	DF	NIR	Craig Farquhar
36	GK	ENG	Anthony Haralambous
37	DF	COD	Aaron Liwala
39	MF	ENG	Mitchell Issott
40	DF	ENG	Rohat Matyar
41	FW	ENG	Kavarni Brissett-Levy
44	FW	ENG	Leo Rix

=== Out on loan ===
Note: Flags indicate national team as defined under FIFA eligibility rules; some limited exceptions apply. Players may hold more than one non-FIFA nationality.

No.	Pos.	Nation	Player
33	MF	ENG	Bright Siaw (at Hampton & Richmond Borough until 9 January 2027)
34	MF	ENG	Jack Blower (at Waltham Abbey until end of 2026-27 season)
38	MF	ENG	Patrick Matejko (at Hertford Town until 21 November 2026)

=== Former players ===
For a complete list of former Barnet players with Wikipedia articles, see Category:Barnet F.C. players.

== Staff ==
As of July 2025.

- Chairman: Anthony Kleanthous
- Head coach: Dean Brennan
- Assistant coach: Connor Smith
- First Team coach: Jerome Okimo
- Strength and conditioning coach: Liam O'Meara
- First-team physio: Jade Doran
- Goalkeeping coach: Craig Holloway
- Performance analyst: Danny Hutchins
- Team Logistics Manager: Kirk Rayment

== Managerial history ==
- 2021 (Republic of Ireland) Dean Brennan
- 2021 (Australia) Harry Kewell
- 2021 (England) Simon Bassey (interim)
- 2021 (England) Gary Anderson (caretaker)
- 2021 (England) Paul Fairclough (caretaker)
- 2020 (England) Tim Flowers
- 2020 (England) Peter Beadle
- 2018 (England) Darren Currie
- 2018 (England) Darren Currie (interim)
- 2018 (England) John Still
- 2018 (England) Martin Allen
- 2018 (England) Graham Westley
- 2017 (Scotland) Mark McGhee
- 2017 (England) Rossi Eames
- 2017 (England) Rossi Eames (interim)
- 2017 (England) Kevin Nugent
- 2016 (England) Rossi Eames & Henry Newman (interim)
- 2014 (England) Martin Allen
- 2014 (Netherlands) Ulrich Landvreugd & (Netherlands) Dick Schreuder
- 2014 (England) Paul Fairclough (caretaker)
- 2012 (Netherlands) Edgar Davids
- 2012 (England) Mark Robson & (Netherlands) Edgar Davids
- 2012 (England) Mark Robson
- 2012 (England) Martin Allen
- 2011 (Northern Ireland) Lawrie Sanchez
- 2011 (England) Giuliano Grazioli (caretaker)
- 2011 (England) Martin Allen
- 2011 (England) Paul Fairclough (caretaker)
- 2010 (England) Mark Stimson
- 2010 (England) Paul Fairclough (caretaker)
- 2008 (England) Ian Hendon
- 2004 (England) Paul Fairclough
- 2004 (England) Ian Hendon & Danny Maddix (Joint Caretakers)
- 2004 (England) Adrian Whitbread & Damien Doyle (Joint Caretakers)
- 2003 (England) Martin Allen
- 2003 (England) Peter Shreeves
- 2001 (England) John Still
- 2001 (England) Tony Cottee
- 1997 (England) John Still
- 1997 (England) Terry Bullivant
- 1996 (England) Alan Mullery
- 1996 (England) Terry Gibson
- 1996 (England) Terry Bullivant
- 1994 (England) Ray Clemence
- 1994 (England) Ray Clemence & Gary Phillips
- 1994 (England) Gary Phillips
- 1993 (South Africa) Edwin Stein
- 1986 (England) Barry Fry
- 1985 (Scotland) Don McAllister
- 1985 (England) Roger Thompson
- 1979 (England) Barry Fry
- 1976 (England) Billy Meadows
- 1975 (England) Colin Flatt
- 1974 (England) Brian Kelly
- 1974 (England) Gordon Ferry
- 1973 (England) Gerry Ward
- 1970 (England) Tommy Coleman
- 1962 (England) Dexter Adams
- 1961 (England) Wally Lines
- 1957 (England) George Wheeler
- 1956 (England) Ted Crawford
- 1954 (England) George Wheeler
- 1951 (England) Lester Finch
- 1951 (England) Sonny Weightman
- 1945 (England) Lester Finch
- 1939 (England) Gerry Kimber
- 1937 (England) Bert Fydelor
- 1929 (England) Reg Clayton
- 1922 (England) Tom Gloss

== Honours ==
League

- Football League Division Three (level 4)
  - Third place, promoted: 1992–93
- Conference/National League (level 5)
  - Champions (4; record): 1990–91, 2004–05, 2014–15, 2024–25
- Southern League Division One (level 6)
  - Champions: 1965–66, 1976–77

Cup

- FA Trophy
  - Runners-up: 1971–72
- Conference League Cup
  - Winners: 1988–89
- Southern League Cup
  - Winners: 1971–72
- FA Amateur Cup
  - Winners: 1945–46
- Micky Mays Memorial Trophy
  - Winners: 1978, 1980, 1981, 1982, 1984, 1985
- Middlesex Senior Cup
  - Winners: 1931–32, 1932–33, 2021–22
- London Senior Cup
  - Winners: 1937–38, 1940–41, 1946–47
- Herts Senior Cup
  - Winners (19): 1939–40, 1941–42, 1944–45, 1945–46, 1947–48, 1948–49, 1949–50, 1957–58, 1960–61, 1962–63, 1964–65, 1979–80, 1985–86, 1990–91, 1991–92, 1992–93, 1995–96, 2006–07, 2010–11

== Club records ==
- Record attendance in League Two: 6,001 vs. Wycombe Wanderers, 2012–13
- Record attendance: 11,026 vs. Wycombe Wanderers, FA Amateur Cup 4th round, 1951–52
- Record home victory: 10–0 vs. Burton Albion (Southern League Premier Division) 7 February 1970
- Record home defeat: 1–9 vs. Peterborough United, Third Division, 5 September 1998
- Record away victory: 6–0 vs. Lincoln City, 4 September 1991, Fourth Division
- Record away defeat: 7–0 vs. Crewe Alexandra, 21 August 2010
- Most League goals in total: Arthur Morris, 403, nine seasons 1927–36
- Most League appearances: Les Eason, 648, 1965–74, 1977–78
- Transfer Record (received): £800,000 from Crystal Palace for Dougie Freedman

=== Cup records ===
- Best FA Cup performance: Fourth round, 2006–07, 2008–09, 2018–19
- Best FA Trophy performance: Runners-up, 1971–72
- Best EFL Cup performance: Third round, 2005–06
- Best EFL Trophy performance: Final (southern section), 2011–12
