= Damola Ajayi =

English footballer (born 2005)

Personal information
- Full name: Oyindamola Oluwatobi Peter Ajayi
- Date of birth: 27 December 2005 (age 20)
- Place of birth: Lambeth, England
- Height: 1.76 m (5 ft 9 in)
- Position: Right winger

Team information
- Current team: Barnet (on loan from Tottenham Hotspur)
- Number: 17

Youth career
- Bromley
- 2022–2025: Tottenham Hotspur

Senior career*
Years	Team	Apps	(Gls)
2025–	Tottenham Hotspur	0	(0)
2025	→ Doncaster Rovers (loan)	11	(0)
2026	→ Bromley (loan)	11	(0)
2026–	→ Barnet (loan)	8	(0)
- * Club domestic league appearances and goals as of 13:02, 8 November 2026 (UTC)

Oyindamola Oluwatobi Peter Ajayi (born 27 December 2005) is an English professional footballer who plays as a right winger for EFL League Two club Barnet on loan from Premier League club Tottenham Hotspur.

== Career ==
A youth product of Bromley, Ajayi joined the youth academy of Tottenham Hotspur in 2022. On 18 January 2024, Ajayi signed his first professional contract with Tottenham and was promoted to their U21 side. He started training with the senior Tottenham side in the preseason in the summer of 2024. He was named to the senior matchday squad for the first time in a UEFA Europa League match against the Hungarian club Ferencvárosi TC on 3 October 2024. On 5 January 2025, he extended his contract with the club until 2028. He made his senior and professional debut with Spurs as a substitute in a 3–0 UEFA Europa League match against IF Elfsborg on 30 January 2025, scoring his side's second goal in his debut. He was a member of the Tottenham Hotspur squad which won the 2024–25 UEFA Europa League, the first title of his professional career, and was on the bench as a non-playing substitute in the final against Manchester United.

On 24 June 2025, Ajayi joined League One side Doncaster Rovers on loan for the forthcoming season. He scored his first goal for the club in a 4–0 win against Middlesbrough on 12 August. On 23 December 2025, Doncaster Rovers terminated Ajayi’s loan agreement, with manager Grant McCann explaining that the decision was made to allow the winger to play more regularly. On 15 January 2026, Ajayi returned to League Two side Bromley on loan. He made 11 appearances as Bromley won the League Two title. On 1 September 2026, Ajayi joined Barnet on loan.

== Personal life ==
Born in England, Ajayi is of Nigerian descent.

== Career statistics ==
As of match played 7 November 2026

Appearances and goals by club, season and competition
Club	Season	League			National cup		League cup		Continental		Other		Total	
Club	Season	Division	Apps	Goals	Apps	Goals	Apps	Goals	Apps	Goals	Apps	Goals	Apps	Goals
Tottenham Hotspur U21	2022–23	—			—		—		—		2 (Note: Appearance(s) in EFL Trophy)	0	2	0
Tottenham Hotspur U21	2023–24	—			—		—		—		1	0	1	0
Tottenham Hotspur U21	2024–25	—			—		—		—		3	1	3	1
Tottenham Hotspur U21	Total		—		—		—		—		6	1	6	1
Tottenham Hotspur	2024–25	Premier League	0	0	0	0	0	0	1 (Note: Appearance(s) in UEFA Europa League)	1	—		1	1
Tottenham Hotspur	2025–26	Premier League	0	0	—		—		—		—		0	0
Tottenham Hotspur	Total		0	0	0	0	0	0	1	1	—		1	1
Doncaster Rovers (loan)	2025–26	League One	11	0	1	0	3	1	—		4	1	19	2
Bromley (loan)	2025–26	League Two	11	0	—		—		—		0	0	11	0
Barnet (loan)	2026–27	League Two	8	0	1	1	—		—		1	0	10	1
Career total			30	0	2	1	3	1	1	1	11	2	47	5

== Honours ==
Tottenham Hotspur

- UEFA Europa League: 2024–25

Bromley

- EFL League Two: 2025–26
