= Anthony Kleanthous =

British businessman

Anthony Andrew Kleanthous (born January 1966) is an English businessman and the current chairman of Barnet Football Club. He became the youngest football chairman in the Football League when, aged 28, he bought the club in 1994.

== Early life ==
The Kleanthous family moved to London from Cyprus and Tony Kleanthous was born in Finsbury Park, north London in 1966. He went to school in Highgate then on to college in Waltham Forest to study motor vehicle engineering.

== Career ==
Kleanthous started out in the motor trade and then moved into petrochemicals. At the age of 21 he formed a telecommunications company called NAG Telecom. He won several industry awards as one of Cellnet's (now O2) largest distributors of mobile phones. In 1994 he bought Barnet F.C., starting his career in football. In 1996 he bought Samsung Telecom when chairman of Service Direct UK PLC to form what was then the largest independent supplier and maintainer of telephone systems in the UK. Kleanthous today owns a £250 million group of over 30 companies across the UK and Europe involved in the property, leisure, football and medical sectors.

=== Football ===
Kleanthous was the youngest director of the Football League and youngest ever director of The Football Association as well as serving on the Professional Game Board and sitting on several committees for the governance of football in the UK. He was the first FA Director appointed League representative to the FA Women's Super League Committee (now Board) and was involved in the inauguration of the Women's Super League competition. He has served three times as a director of the Football Conference and was responsible for re-branding the competition as the National League. He formed and chaired National League Broadcasting, which trained students in camera and sports filming techniques that were then utilised to produce the BT Sport highlight shows.

Kleanthous has seen Barnet F.C. reach its furthest positions in the FA Cup, League Cup and EFL Trophy as well as qualifying four times for the play-offs. The 2001 relegation of the club from the Football League was followed four years later by its promotion but the club needed a new modern home. He bought Barnet Cricket Club, adjacent to the football club's existing ground, Underhill Stadium, as he thought it would be an ideal site to develop a larger stadium. However, Barnet Council did not want the expansion; after failing to convince Barnet Council to support the club's expansion plans, he eventually relocated the club to his leisure complex at The Hive in the neighbouring London Borough of Harrow.

He was an early pioneer in women's football and adopted Barnet Ladies in 1995, integrating them within the Barnet F.C. set-up, the first women's football club fully incorporated within a men's league club. Then in 2013 he formed a new women's football team, the London Bees, who won a license to play in the FA Women's Super League. The London Bees have joined Barnet F.C. at The Hive.

=== Leisure ===
Kleanthous was responsible for the planning, construction and opening of "The Hive” at the Prince Edward's playing fields, in Edgware. He initially invested £11 million into the 44-acre (180,000 m^{2}) site to develop several astroturf pitches, 10 grass pitches, 14 dressing rooms, physiotherapy rooms and meeting rooms. It was opened as a centre of footballing excellence on 15 December 2009 by Fabio Capello and Sir Trevor Brooking. He has subsequently invested over £50 million to turn the site into a sports training venue and stadium with medical sports science facilities. The Hive leisure complex has hosted international teams from Brazil, Germany, Spain, Italy, Peru, Sweden and many other premier overseas clubs as well as various England national teams. It has become a base for the Nigerian national team and has played host to the London Broncos, the Oxford Cambridge Varsity Finals, county cup finals and various other men's and women's club cup finals.

Development on the site is ongoing with planning granted in 2018 for an academy, indoor hall, stadium expansion and multi level parking facilities set to cost around £20 million over two years, taking the value of the complex to over £150 million.

=== Medical ===
Kleanthous partnered with Toshiba Medical Systems (now Canon Medical) to form the first medical imaging academy in the UK and announced a further learning facility due to open in 2020 at Glasgow Caledonian University. He owns several medical scanning and diagnostics companies trading under the brand of TIC Health and operates a £10 million+ fleet of over a dozen high tech mobile scanning relocatables which are deployed in hospitals around the UK under the brand of TIC Mobile. In 2017 he opened “The Imaging Centre” at The Hive which cost nearly £8 million and is the most advanced sports medical scanning unit in Europe. In keeping with his philosophy of the best being available to everyone, this centre is open to the local community as well as providing high performance imaging for elite athletes. In 2019, the centre successfully supported the Royal Free Hospital to help reduce a waiting list in difficult oncology scans. In the same year TIC Health also acquired Cardio Direct and Cooper Health in Harley Street and now provides cardiac screening services for the FA as well as Premier League and Football League clubs.
