= 2025–26 Barnet F.C. season =

138th season in existence of Barnet FC

Barnet
2025–26 season
- Chairman: Anthony Kleanthous
- Head Coach: Dean Brennan
- Stadium: The Hive Stadium
- League Two: 8th
- FA Cup: First Round
- EFL Cup: Preliminary round (vs. Newport County)
- EFL Trophy: Group stage

The 2025–26 season is the 138th season in the history of Barnet Football Club and their first back season in the English Football League, League Two since the 2017–18 season following their promotion from the National League in the preceding season. In addition to the domestic league, the club will also participate in the FA Cup, the EFL Cup, and the EFL Trophy.

== Transfers and contracts ==
=== In ===
Date	Pos.	Player	From	Fee	Ref.
1 July 2025 (Note: The transfer was announced on 23 June, and would become official on July 1 once his contract at Bradford had ended)	CB	(England) Romoney Crichlow	(England) Bradford City	Free	
1 July 2025 (Note: The transfer was announced on 26 June, and would become official on July 1 once his contract at Cheltenham had ended)	GK	(Wales) Owen Evans	(England) Cheltenham Town	Free	
1 July 2025 (Note: The transfer was announced on 22 May, and would become official on July 1 once his contract at Halifax had ended)	LB	(England) Ryan Galvin	(England) FC Halifax Town	Free	
1 July 2025 (Note: The transfer was announced on 17 June, and would become official on July 1 once his contract at Gillingham had ended)	CF	(England) Oliver Hawkins	(England) Gillingham	Free	
1 July 2025 (Note: The transfer was announced on 25 June, and would become official on July 1 once his contract at Huddersfield had ended)	CM	(Scotland) Scott High	(England) Huddersfield Town	Free	
1 July 2025 (Note: The transfer was announced on 23 May, and would become official on July 1 once his contract at Eastbourne had ended)	CB	(England) Ollie Kensdale	(England) Eastbourne Borough	Free	
1 July 2025 (Note: The transfer was announced on 5 June, and would become official on July 1 once his contract at Forest Green had ended)	CM	(Republic of Ireland) Emmanuel Osadebe	(England) Forest Green Rovers	Free	
1 July 2025 (Note: The transfer was announced on 25 May, and would become official on July 1 once his contract at Halifax had ended)	CB	(England) Adam Senior	(England) FC Halifax Town	Free	
15 July 2025	RB	(England) Kane Smith	(England) Stevenage	Free	
17 July 2025	CM	(England) Dennis Adeniran	(Scotland) St Mirren	Free	
28 July 2025	CM	(Nigeria) Nnamdi Ofoborh	(England) Swindon Town	Free	
29 July 2025	GK	(England) Joe Wright	(England) Eastbourne Borough	Free	
20 October 2025	CF	(Democratic Republic of the Congo) Britt Assombalonga	(Turkey) Amedspor	Free	
22 January 2026	CF	(England) Kabongo Tshimanga	(England) Crawley Town	Undisclosed	

=== Out ===
Date	Pos.	Player	To	Fee	Ref.
18 June 2025	CB	(England) Joe Grimwood	(England) Chelmsford City	Undisclosed	
23 June 2025	GK	(Uganda) Giosue Bellagambi	(England) Ebbsfleet United	Undisclosed	
30 June 2025	AM	(England) Finley Wilkinson	(England) Hemel Hempstead Town	Undisclosed	
7 July 2025	AM	(Grenada) Jermaine Francis	(England) Hartlepool United	Undisclosed	
13 November 2025	CM	(England) Zak Brunt	(England) Boreham Wood	Undisclosed	
12 December 2025	CM	(Scotland) Scott High	(England) Solihull Moors	Undisclosed	
7 January 2026	LB	(England) Ryan Galvin	(England) Carlisle United	Undisclosed	
9 January 2026	CB	(England) Ollie Kensdale	(England) Boreham Wood	Undisclosed	
24 January 2026	CF	(Zimbabwe) Lee Ndlovu	(England) Notts County	Undisclosed	

=== Loaned in ===
Date	Pos.	Player	From	Date until	Ref.
19 July 2025	CF	(England) Joe Hugill	(England) Manchester United	14 January 2026 (Note: Initially a season-long loan, Hugill was recalled on 14 January 2026)	
7 August 2025	GK	(Scotland) Cieran Slicker	(England) Ipswich Town	31 May 2026	
1 September 2025	CDM	(England) Ben Winterburn	(England) Bournemouth	31 May 2026	
2 September 2025	CF	(England) Ronnie Stutter	(England) Chelsea	31 May 2026	
20 January 2026	CB	(England) Phillip Chinedu	(England) Leyton Orient	31 May 2026	
20 January 2026	RW	(England) Diallang Jaiyesimi	(England) Leyton Orient	31 May 2026	
2 February 2026	RW	(England) Jack Howland	(England) Millwall	31 May 2026	

=== Loaned out ===
Date	Pos.	Player	To	Date until	Ref.
25 July 2025	CB	(England) Joe Rye	(England) Tamworth	31 May 2026	
28 August 2025	CM	(England) Zak Brunt	(England) Boreham Wood	31 May 2026	
2 September 2025	LW	(England) Bright Siaw	(England) Welling United	28 September 2025	
6 September 2025	GK	(England) Joe Wright	(England) Dorking Wanderers	6 September 2025	
19 September 2025	GK	(England) Joe Wright	(England) Kidderminster Harriers	20 September 2025	
17 October 2025	CM	(Scotland) Scott High	(England) Solihull Moors	12 December 2025 (Note: On 12 December, High joined Solihull on a permanent basis)	
24 October 2025	LW	(England) Bright Siaw	(England) Southall	27 March 2026 (Note: On 24 November, Siaw's loan at Southall was extended until mid-January. Then on 14 January, it was extended until the end of the season. On 27 March, Siaw was recalled from loan.)	
4 November 2025	GK	(England) Joe Wright	(England) Bedford Town	2 December 2025	
22 November 2025	CB	(England) Joe Kizzi	(England) Enfield Town	20 December 2025	
28 November 2025	LB	(England) Ryan Galvin	(England) Rochdale	6 January 2026 (Note: On 6 January, Galvin was recalled from his loan at Rochdale)	
9 December 2025	CB	(England) Rohat Matyar	(England) Maldon & Tiptree	30 April 2026	
17 December 2025	CM	(England) Jack Blower	(England) Grays Athletic	31 May 2026 (Note: On 15 January, Blower's loan at Grays Athletic was extended until the end of the season)	
31 December 2025	GK	(England) Joe Wright	(England) Chelmsford City	31 May 2026 (Note: On 26 January, Wright's loan at Chelmsford City was extended until the end of the season)	
8 January 2026	CM	(England) Patrick Matejko	(England) Berkhamsted	31 May 2026	

=== Released / out of contract ===
Date	Pos.	Player	Subsequent club	Ref.
30 June 2025	AM	(England) Harry Chapman	(England) Gateshead	
30 June 2025	CM	(England) Billy Clifford	(England) Farnborough	
30 June 2025	LB	(England) Ben Coker	(England) Ebbsfleet United	
30 June 2025	RB	(England) Jordan Cropper	(England) Boston United	
30 June 2025	RB	(England) Reece Hall-Johnson	(England) King's Lynn Town	
30 June 2025	LB	(Zimbabwe) Shane Maroodza	(Republic of Ireland) Kerry	
30 June 2025	CB	(England) Jerome Okimo	Retired (Note: Following Okimo's retirement from playing, he remained with the club in a coaching position.)	
30 June 2025	CB	(Nigeria) Adebola Oluwo	(England) Salford City	
30 June 2025	CB	(England) Richard Nartey		

=== New Contract ===
Date	Pos.	Player	Contracted until	Ref.
23 May 2025	CB	(Croatia) Nikola Tavares	Undisclosed	
29 May 2025	LM	(Sierra Leone) Idris Kanu	Undisclosed	
3 June 2025	CB	(England) Danny Collinge	Undisclosed	
23 January 2026	LM	(England) Bright Siaw	30 June 2029	

== Pre-season and friendlies ==
On 22 May, Barnet announced their first pre-season friendly, against Wycombe Wanderers. A day later, a trip to face Boreham Wood was also added. A week later, a trip to face Hitchin Town was added. A fourth and fifth pre-season friendly was later confirmed against Hemel Hempstead Town and Leyton Orient. A sixth friendly was also confirmed against Crystal Palace U21.

Win Draw Loss Fixtures

28 June 2025 Friendly	Barnet	5–1	Sheffield	Edgware
14:00 BST	Shelton; Glover; Osadebe; Trialist; Crichlow	Report		Stadium: The Hive Stadium; Attendance: 0 (Behind closed doors)

1 July 2025 Friendly	Hitchin Town	0–3	Barnet	Hitchin
19:45 BST		Report	Browne 7' 20' (pen.); Senior 30'	Stadium: Top Field; Attendance: 590; Referee: Richard Wharton

5 July 2025 Friendly	Hemel Hempstead Town	2–2	Barnet	Hemel Hempstead
15:00 BST	Dowrich 9'; Matthews-Lewis 85'	Report	Hartigan 17'; Browne 43'	Stadium: Vauxhall Road
Note: Spencer McCall Memorial Game

8 July 2025 Friendly	Barnet	1–3	Crystal Palace U21	Edgware
19:45 BST	Hawkins 36'	Report	Umolu 29'; Agbinone 37', 45+1' (pen.)	Stadium: The Hive Stadium; Attendance: 1,413

12 July 2025 Friendly	Barnet	2–2	Dorking Wanderers	Edgware
12:30 BST	Browne 32'; High 80' (pen.)	Report	Rutherford 10'; Pybus 62'	Stadium: The Hive Stadium; Attendance: 0 (Behind closed doors)

19 July 2025 Friendly	Barnet	2–0	Leyton Orient	Edgware
15:00 BST	Collinge; Brunt	Report		Stadium: The Hive Stadium; Attendance: 0 (behind-closed-doors)
Note: Match was initially postponed due to a unplayable playing surface, but after a couple of hours a second referee deemed the pitch playable.

22 July 2025 Friendly	Barnet	1–1	Wycombe Wanderers	Edgware
19:45 BST	Galvin 76'	Report	Kone 7'	Stadium: The Hive Stadium

25 July 2025 Friendly	Barnet XI	0–4	Leyton Orient	Edgware
12:00 BST		Report	Obiero 16'; Abdulai 35'; Jaiyesimi 55'; Carter 66'	Stadium: The Hive Stadium; Attendance: 0 (behind-closed-doors)

== Competitions ==
=== League Two ===
==== League table ====
Pos	Team	Pld	W	D	L	GF	GA	GD	Pts	Promotion, qualification or relegation
6	Chesterfield	46	21	16	9	71	56	+15	79	Qualification for League Two play-offs
7	Grimsby Town	46	22	12	12	74	50	+24	78	Qualification for League Two play-offs
8	Barnet	46	21	13	12	70	53	+17	76	
9	Swindon Town	46	22	9	15	70	59	+11	75	
10	Oldham Athletic	46	18	14	14	60	44	+16	68	

Source: EFL Official Website
Rules for classification: 1) Points; 2) Goal difference; 3) Number of goals scored; 4) Head-to-head results; 5) Wins; 6) Away goals; 7) Penalty points (sec 9.5); 8) 12-point sending off offences

==== Results summary ====
Overall								Home						Away					
Pld	W	D	L	GF	GA	GD	Pts	W	D	L	GF	GA	GD	W	D	L	GF	GA	GD
46	21	13	12	70	53	+17	76	10	6	7	38	29	+9	11	7	5	32	24	+8

Last updated: complete.
Source: Soccerway

==== Results by round ====
Round	1	2	3	4	5	6	7	8	9	10	11	12	13	14	15	16	17	18	19	20	21	22	23	24	27	28	29	30	25^{1}	31	32	33	34	26^{2}	35	36	37	38	39	40	41	42	43	44	45	46
Ground	H	A	H	A	A	H	H	A	H	A	H	A	H	A	H	A	A	H	H	A	H	A	A	H	A	H	H	A	H	A	H	H	A	A	H	A	H	A	A	H	H	A	H	A	H	A
Result	L	L	L	W	W	D	L	W	W	D	W	W	L	D	D	D	D	D	W	L	L	D	W	W	L	W	W	D	D	W	D	L	L	W	W	L	L	D	W	W	D	W	W	W	W	W
Position	23	24	22	18	15	15	18	15	13	15	11	7	10	12	11	11	14	14	11	13	13	13	12	11	13	13	11	11	11	10	11	11	12	9	9	10	12	12	12	12	12	11	9	9	9	8
Points	0	0	0	3	6	7	7	10	13	14	17	20	20	21	22	23	24	25	28	28	28	29	32	35	35	38	41	42	43	46	47	47	47	50	53	53	53	54	57	60	61	64	67	70	73	76

Source: EFL
A = Away; H = Home; W = Win; D = Draw; L = Loss; P = Postponed
Notes:
- ^{1} Matchday 25 (vs. Crewe Alexandra) was postponed due to a frozen pitch.
- ^{2} Matchday 26 (vs. Accrington Stanley) was postponed due to a frozen pitch.

==== Matches ====
On 26 June the League Two fixtures were announced, with Barnet hosting Fleetwood Town on the opening day.

Win Draw Loss Fixtures

2 August 2025 1	Barnet	0–2	Fleetwood Town	Edgware
15:00 BST		Report	Davies 22'; Bonds 50'	Stadium: The Hive Stadium; Attendance: 3,709 (291 Fleetwood Town Supporters); Referee: Aaron Bannister

9 August 2025 2	Bromley	2–0	Barnet	Bromley
15:00 BST	Ifill (yellow card) 31'; Cheek 36'; Webster (yellow card) 78'; Pinnock (yellow card) 82'; Kabamba 90+5'	Report	Crichlow (yellow card) 35'	Stadium: Hayes Lane; Referee: Lee Swabey

16 August 2025 3	Barnet	1–2	Walsall	Edgware
15:00 BST	Ofoborh (yellow card) 31' (yellow-red card) 53'; Shelton (yellow card) 35'; Hawkins 40'; Smith (yellow card) 49'	Report	Barrett 2'; Pressley 22'	Stadium: The Hive Stadium; Attendance: 2,608; Referee: Abigail Byrne

19 August 2025 4	Swindon Town	0–2	Barnet	Swindon
19:45 BST	Smith (yellow card) 38'; Wright (yellow card) 43'	Report	Osadebe 85'; Shelton (yellow card) 90+1'; Kensdale (yellow card) 90+7'; Adeniran 90+10', (yellow card) 90+11'	Stadium: County Ground; Attendance: 7,485; Referee: Andrew Humphries

23 August 2025 5	Cheltenham Town	0–1	Barnet	Cheltenham
15:00 BST	Mažionis (yellow card) 58'		Hartigan (yellow card) 49'; Hawkins 62'; Osadebe (red card) 78'	Stadium: Whaddon Road; Attendance: 3,241; Referee: Scott Jackson

30 August 2025 6	Barnet	1–1	Colchester United	Edgware
15:00 BST	Glover (yellow card) 39'; Collinge 90'; Senior (yellow card) 90+5'	Report	Tucker 9'	Stadium: The Hive Stadium; Attendance: 3,098 (1,245 visitors); Referee: Tom Reeves

6 September 2025 7	Barnet	1–3	Shrewsbury Town	Edgware
15:00 BST	Shelton 14'; High (yellow card) 33'	Report	Anderson (yellow card) 6'; Collinge 15' (o.g.); Ihionvien 25', (yellow card) 26'; Clucas 42'; Marquis (yellow card) 44'; McDermott (yellow card) 84'; Lloyd (yellow card) 88'	Stadium: The Hive Stadium; Attendance: 3,009 (490 visitors); Referee: Kirsty Dowle

13 September 2025 8	Crewe Alexandra	1–2	Barnet	Crewe
15:00 BST	O'Reilly 54'; March (penalty missed) 61'; Sanders (penalty missed) 71'	Report	Hartigan (yellow card) 38'; Ndlovu 57'; Collinge (yellow card) 70'; Glover 80'; Senior (yellow card) 86'; Shelton (yellow card) 87'	Stadium: Gresty Road; Attendance: 4,762; Referee: Declan Bourne

20 September 2025 9	Barnet	3–0	Grimsby Town	Edgware
15:00 BST	Collinge (yellow card) 22'; Shelton (yellow card) 28'; Ofoborh 42', 67'; Ndlovu 64'	Report		Stadium: The Hive Stadium; Attendance: 3,270 (1,275 away fans); Referee: Ben Atkinson

27 September 2025 10	Oldham Athletic	1–1	Barnet	Oldham
12:30 BST	Robson (yellow card) 1'; Woods (yellow card) 45'; Mellon 71' (pen.)	Report	Shelton 5' (pen.), (yellow card) 5'; Hawkins (yellow card) 55'; Kanu (yellow card) 56'	Stadium: Boundary Park; Attendance: 7,333 (175 away); Referee: Sebastian Stockbridge
Note: Fixture was originally scheduled for a 15:00 kick-off, but was moved live Sky Sports broadcasting.

4 October 2025 11	Barnet	2–0	Accrington Stanley	Edgware
15:00 BST	Stead 21'; Osadebe (yellow card) 23'; Glover 78'	Report	Matthews (yellow card) 53'; Brown (yellow card) 63'; Ward (yellow card) 67'	Stadium: The Hive Stadium; Attendance: 2,058 (155 visitors); Referee: Neil Hair

11 October 2025 12	Tranmere Rovers	0–2	Barnet	Birkenhead
15:00 BST		Report	Ndlovu 26'; Senior 40'; Slicker (yellow card) 47', (red card) 90+6'; Collinge (yellow card) 52'; Crichlow (yellow card) 57'; Hawkins (yellow card) 82'	Stadium: Prenton Park; Attendance: 6,519; Referee: Richard Eley

18 October 2025 13	Barnet	0–1	Notts County	Edgware
15:00 BST	Crichlow (yellow card) 46'; Ndlovu (yellow card) 53'; Senior (yellow card) 64'	Report	McDonald (yellow card) 21'; Hall 90+4', (yellow card) 90+5'	Stadium: The Hive Stadium; Attendance: 3,875 (1,291 visitors); Referee: Martin Woods

25 October 2025 14	Barrow	2–2	Barnet	Barrow-in-Furness
15:00 BST	Gordon 10'; Williams (red card) 39'; Whitfield (yellow card) 49'; Smith (yellow card) 59'; Tavares 68' (o.g.)	Report	Stead 51'; Senior 60'; Ndlovu (yellow card) 72'	Stadium: Holker Street; Attendance: 2,919; Referee: Declan Brown

8 November 2025 15	Barnet	2–2	Milton Keynes Dons	Edgware
15:00 GMT	Adam Senior 13'; Shelton 28' (pen.)	Report	Sanders 39'; Mendez-Laing 65'	Stadium: The Hive Stadium; Attendance: 3,597; Referee: James Durkin

15 November 2025 16	Cambridge United	0–0	Barnet	Cambridge
15:00 GMT	Mpanzu (yellow card) 63'; Morrison (yellow card) 89'	Report		Stadium: Abbey Stadium; Attendance: 7,572; Referee: Simon Mather

22 November 2025 17	Gillingham	1–1	Barnet	Gillingham
12:30 GMT	Dack 45+2'; Vokes (yellow card) 64'; Hutton (yellow card) 72'; Williams (yellow card) 74'; Khumbeni (yellow card) 90+4'	Report	Stead 17', (yellow card) 63'; Ofoborh (yellow card) 51'; Kanu (yellow card) 80'	Stadium: Priestfield Stadium; Attendance: 5,778; Referee: Ben Atkinson
Note: Fixture was originally scheduled for a 15:00 kick-off, but was rescheduled for live Sky Sports broadcasting.

29 November 2025 18	Barnet	1–1	Harrogate Town	Edgware
15:00 GMT	Assombalonga 23'; Shelton (penalty missed) 43'	Report	O'Connor (yellow card) 45+5'; Muldoon 78'; Fox (yellow card) 90+4'	Stadium: The Hive Stadium; Attendance: 2,187 (145 visitors); Referee: Elliott Swallow

9 December 2025 19	Barnet	4–0	Bristol Rovers	Edgware
19:45 GMT	Senior 15'; Ofoborh 30'; Slicker (yellow card) 39'; Shelton 78' (pen.); Stead 89'	Report	McEachran (yellow card) 29'	Stadium: The Hive Stadium; Attendance: 2,157 (414 visitors); Referee: Lee Swabey

13 December 2025 20	Chesterfield	3–1	Barnet	Chesterfield
15:00 GMT	Bonis 11', 38'; Dunkley (yellow card) 65'; Gordon (yellow card) 79'; Stirk (yellow card) 80'; Mandeville 80'	Report	Shelton 41'	Stadium: SMH Group Stadium; Attendance: 7,533; Referee: Peter Wright

20 December 2025 21	Barnet	1–3	Salford City	Edgware
15:00 GMT	Hawkins 89'	Report	Austerfield 34'; Ofoborh 39' (o.g.); Udoh 56'; N'Mai (yellow card) 73'; Borini (yellow card) 90+4'	Stadium: The Hive Stadium; Attendance: 2,220 (115 visitors); Referee: Aaron Farmer

26 December 2025 22	Newport County	0–0	Barnet	Newport
15:00 GMT	Brennan (yellow card) 90+4'	Report		Stadium: Rodney Parade; Attendance: 4,219; Referee: Stephen Parkinson

29 December 2025 23	Bristol Rovers	0–2	Barnet	Horfield
19:45 GMT	Mola (yellow card) 43'; Sparkes (yellow card) 57'; Kilgour (yellow card) 87'	Report	Winterburn (yellow card) 40'; Senior 45'; Shelton (penalty missed) 61'; Ofoborh (yellow card) 63'; Glover 86'	Stadium: Memorial Stadium; Referee: Declan Bourne

1 January 2026 24	Barnet	2–1	Crawley Town	Edgware
15:00 GMT	Kizzi 5', 76'; Ofoborh (yellow card) 27'	Report	McKirdy 33'; Vassell (yellow card) 66'; Watson (yellow card) 72'	Stadium: The Hive Stadium; Attendance: 2,566 (414 visitors); Referee: Ross Martin

17 January 2026 27	Grimsby Town	1–0	Barnet	Cleethorpes
15:00 GMT	Khouri (yellow card) 32'; Sweeney 51'	Report	Kizzi (red card) 11'; Kanu (yellow card) 28'	Stadium: Blundell Park; Attendance: 6,046; Referee: Jamie O'Connor

24 January 2026 28	Barnet	3–2	Oldham Athletic	Edgware
12:30 GMT	Collinge (yellow card) 6'; Glover 36'; Tshimanga 45' (pen.), 87'; Tavares (red card) 64'; Slicker (yellow card) 71'; Smith (yellow card) 90+4'	Report	Pett 11'; Daniels (yellow card) 42'; Stevens 69'	Stadium: The Hive Stadium; Attendance: 2,715 (531 from Oldham); Referee: Darren Drysdale
Note: Fixture was initially scheduled for a 15:00 kick-off, but was rescheduled for live Sky Sports broadcasting.

27 January 2026 29	Barnet	1–0	Tranmere Rovers	Edgware
19:45 GMT	Tshimanga (yellow card) 37'; Glover (yellow card) 58'; Shelton 90+6'	Report	Murphy (yellow card) 45+6'; Tamen (yellow card) 52'; Finley (yellow card) 54'	Stadium: The Hive Stadium; Attendance: 1,983 (422 visitors); Referee: Carl Brook

31 January 2026 30	Shrewsbury Town	0–0	Barnet	Shrewsbury
15:00 GMT	Hoole (yellow card) 50'; McDermott (yellow card) 90+6'	Report	Tshimanga (yellow card) 25'	Stadium: New Meadow; Attendance: 5,075; Referee: Neil Hair

3 February 2026 25	Barnet	1–1	Crewe Alexandra	Edgware
19:45 GMT	Tshimanga 7'	Report	Lunt 32', (yellow card) 72'; Hutchinson (yellow card) 48'; Pond (yellow card) 82'	Stadium: The Hive Stadium; Attendance: 1,908 (213 visitors); Referee: Peter Wright
Note: Fixture was originally scheduled for 4 January, but it was postponed due to a frozen pitch.

7 February 2026 31	Walsall	1–3	Barnet	Walsall
15:00 GMT	Pressley (yellow card) 2'; Hancock (yellow card) 62'; Kanu 64'; Comley (yellow card) 71'; Clarke (yellow card) 71'; Farquharson (yellow card) 87'	Report	Senior 41'; Kanu 54'; Smith (yellow card) 62'; Tshimanga 68'	Stadium: Bescot Stadium; Attendance: 5,179; Referee: Paul Marsden

14 February 2026 32	Barnet	0–0	Cheltenham Town	Edgware
12:30 GMT	Kizzi (yellow card) 48'; Glover (yellow card) 52'; Ofoborh (yellow card) 82'; Tavares (yellow card) 90'	Report	Hutchinson (yellow card) 31'; Jude-Boyd (yellow card) 84' (yellow-red card) 90+9'	Stadium: The Hive Stadium; Attendance: 2,429 (289 visitors); Referee: Sam Mulhall
Note: Fixture was initially scheduled for a 15:00 kick-off, but was rescheduled for live Sky Sports broadcasting.

17 February 2026 33	Barnet	1–2	Swindon Town	Edgware
19:45 GMT	Senior 9'; Winterburn (yellow card) 84'	Report	Clarke 50', 63'; Snowdon (yellow card) 90+6'	Stadium: The Hive Stadium; Attendance: 2,880 (1,118 visitors); Referee: Craig Hicks

21 February 2026 34	Colchester United	4–1	Barnet	Colchester
15:00 GMT	Tovide (yellow card) 26'; Read 39'; Goodwin (yellow card) 64'; Payne 75' (pen.), 77', 90+4'	Report	Kizzi (yellow card) 31'; Ofoborh 45+1'; Hawkins (yellow card) 78'; Chinedu (yellow card) 90+6'	Stadium: Colchester Community Stadium; Attendance: 5,195; Referee: Alex Chilowicz

24 February 2026 26	Accrington Stanley	0–1	Barnet	Accrington
19:45 GMT	Conneely (yellow card) 36'	Report	Tshimanga 81'	Stadium: Crown Ground; Attendance: 1,510; Referee: Michael Barlow
Note: Fixture was originally scheduled for 10 January, but it was postponed due to a frozen pitch.

28 February 2026 35	Barnet	1–0	Chesterfield	Edgware
15:00 GMT	Ofoborh 65'	Report		Stadium: The Hive Stadium; Attendance: 2,901 (887 visitors); Referee: William Davis

7 March 2026 36	Salford City	2–0	Barnet	Kersal
12:30 GMT	Mnoga (yellow card) 28'; Longelo 39'; Butcher 45'; Grant (yellow card) 90+3'	Report		Stadium: Moor Lane; Attendance: 2,537; Referee: Bobby Madley
Note: Fixture was originally scheduled for a 15:00 kick-off, but was moved to an earlier time for Sky Sports broadcasting.

14 March 2026 37	Barnet	1–2	Newport County	Edgware
15:00 GMT	Stead 32'; Glover (yellow card) 77'	Report	Davies (yellow card) 59'; Kamwa 65'; Sprangler (yellow card) 75'; Crole 83'	Stadium: The Hive Stadium; Attendance: 2,256 (280 visitors); Referee: Oliver Mackey

17 March 2026 38	Crawley Town	1–1	Barnet	Crawley
19:45 GMT	Bajrami (yellow card) 45+1'; Orsi 89' (pen.); Darcy (yellow card) 90'	Report	Glover (yellow card) 21'; Shelton 56'; Tavares (yellow card) 58'; Kanu (yellow card) 69'; Browne (yellow card) 88'; Crichlow (yellow card) 90'	Stadium: Broadfield Stadium; Referee: Harry Wager

21 March 2026 39	Milton Keynes Dons	1–3	Barnet	Denbigh
12:30 GMT	Mellish 7'; Hepburn-Murphy (penalty missed) 62'; Jones (yellow card) 90+1'	Report	Kanu (yellow card) 12', (goal) 57'; Crichlow (yellow card) 45'; Collinge 45+5'; Tshimanga 48'	Stadium: Stadium MK; Attendance: 7,944; Referee: Dale Baines
Note: Fixture was initially scheduled for a 15:00 kick-off, but was brought forward for Sky Sports broadcasting.

28 March 2026 40	Barnet	1–0	Cambridge United	Edgware
15:00 GMT	Collinge 49'	Report		Stadium: The Hive Stadium; Attendance: 4,410 (1,800 visitors); Referee: Martin Woods

3 April 2026 41	Barnet	2–2	Bromley	Edgware
15:00 BST	Chinedu 18'; Collinge (red card) 69'; Tshimanga 76' (pen.); Tavares (yellow card) 90+12'	Report	Kabamba 12'; Hondermarck (yellow card) 49'; Cameron (yellow card) 74'; Smith (yellow card) 76'; Ajayi (yellow card) 87'; Evans 90+11'	Stadium: The Hive Stadium; Attendance: 3,903 (1,352 visitors); Referee: David Rock

6 April 2026 42	Fleetwood Town	2–5	Barnet	Fleetwood
15:00 BST	Rooney (red card) 45+1'; Neal 51'; Potter (yellow card) 65'; Helm 69' (pen.); Powell (yellow card) 76'	Report	Shelton (yellow card) 9'; Crichlow (yellow card) 21'; Stead 45+3'; Hartigan 47'; Glover (yellow card) 65'; Tshimanga 77' (pen.), 79'; Jaiyesimi 90+4'	Stadium: Highbury Stadium; Attendance: 2,605; Referee: Declan Bourne

11 April 2026 43	Barnet	3–2	Barrow	Edgware
15:00 BST	Tshimanga 45+2'; Shelton 53'; Kanu (yellow card) 60'; Stead 84'	Report	Gordon 3'; Williams (yellow card) 10'; Harper 73'	Stadium: The Hive Stadium; Attendance: 2,075 (177 visitors); Referee: Simon Mather

18 April 2026 44	Notts County	1–2	Barnet	Nottingham
15:00 BST	Jones 36' (pen.); Hall (yellow card) 90'	Report	Tshimanga 32', 69'; Senior (yellow card) 89'	Stadium: Meadow Lane; Attendance: 11,437; Referee: Tom Reeves

25 April 2026 45	Barnet	6–2	Gillingham	Edgware
15:00 BST	Stead 6', 15', 16', 30', 70'; Crichlow-Noble 45+4'	Report	Booth 13'; Andrews 90+4'	Stadium: The Hive Stadium; Attendance: 3,704; Referee: Ollie Yates

2 May 2026 46	Harrogate Town	1–2	Barnet	Harrogate
15:00 BST	Brenan (yellow card) 13'; McCoulsky (yellow card) 21'; Morris 29' (pen.)	Report	Stead 5'; Tavares (yellow card) 45'; Collinge (yellow card) 46'; Chinedu 82'	Stadium: Wetherby Road; Attendance: 3,952; Referee: Thomas Parsons

=== FA Cup ===
Barnet were drawn away to Fleetwood Town in the first round.

Win Draw Loss Fixtures

1 November 2025 First round	Fleetwood Town	2–1	Barnet	Fleetwood
15:00 GMT	Medley 11'; Neal (yellow card) 63'; Holgate 86'	Report	Stead 89'	Stadium: Highbury Stadium; Attendance: 1,076; Referee: Scott Jackson

=== EFL Cup ===
Barnet will take part in a preliminary round of the EFL Cup due to the number of Premier League teams being involved in European competitions. They would face Newport County.

Win Draw Loss Fixtures

29 July 2025 Preliminary round	Barnet	2–2 (2–4 p)	Newport County	Edgware
19:30 BST	Kanu (yellow card) 85'; Galvin 90+7'; Browne 90+9'	Report	Antwi 31', (yellow card) 41'; Reindorf 42'; Jenkins (yellow card) 75'	Stadium: The Hive Stadium; Attendance: 1,789 (278 Newport County); Referee: Darren Drysdale
	Penalties
	Adeniran (penalty scored); Browne (penalty scored); Hugill (penalty missed); Smith (penalty missed)		(penalty missed) Garner; (penalty scored) Lloyd; (penalty scored) Antwi; (penalty scored) Kamwa; (penalty scored) Evans

=== EFL Trophy ===
Barnet were drawn against Cambridge United, Luton Town and Brighton & Hove Albion U21 in the group stage.

Pos	Div	Team	Pld	W	PW	PL	L	GF	GA	GD	Pts	Qualification
1	L1	Luton Town	3	2	0	0	1	8	5	+3	6	Advance to Round 2
2	L2	Cambridge United	3	2	0	0	1	6	4	+2	6	Advance to Round 2
3	L2	Barnet	3	1	1	0	1	5	7	−2	5	
4	ACA	Brighton & Hove Albion U21	3	0	0	1	2	2	5	−3	1	

Source: EFL

Win Draw Loss Fixtures

2 September 2025 South Group H	Luton Town	4–1	Barnet	Luton
19:30 BST	Nordås 11'; Yates 19'; Bramall 45+2'; Morris 87' (pen.)	Report	Kensdale (yellow card) 6'; Winterburn (yellow card) 86'; Senior 90+6'	Stadium: Kenilworh Road; Attendance: 3,157; Referee: Stephen Parkinson

30 September 2025 South Group H	Barnet	1–1 (5–4 p)	Brighton & Hove Albion U21	Edgware
19:45 BST	Stead 58'; Crichlow (yellow card) 82'	Report	Barclay (yellow card) 30'; Robertson 44'; Knight (yellow card) 45+10'; Shaw (yellow card) 70'; Silsby (yellow card) 85'	Stadium: The Hive Stadium; Attendance: 433 (93 visitors); Referee: Craig Hicks
	Penalties
	Adeniran (penalty scored); Hawkins (penalty scored); Stead (penalty scored); Glover (penalty scored); Winterburn (penalty missed); Galvin (penalty scored)		(penalty missed) Knight; (penalty scored) Nti; (penalty scored) Shaw; (penalty scored) Keogh; (penalty scored) Silsby; (penalty missed) Simmonds (penalty missed)

21 October 2025 South Group H	Barnet	3–2	Cambridge United	Edgware
19:45 BST	Ndlovu 2'; Osadebe (yellow card) 31', (goal) 90'; Crichlow (yellow card) 51'; Assombalonga 72'	Report	Hawkins 20' (o.g.); Kachunga 33'; Bradshaw (yellow card) 45+4'	Stadium: The Hive Stadium; Attendance: 692 (167 visitors); Referee: Sam Mulhall

== Statistics ==
=== Appearances and goals ===
Players with no appearances are not included on the list; italics indicate a loaned in player

No.	Pos	Nat	Player	Total		League Two		FA Cup		EFL Cup		EFL Trophy	
No.	Pos	Nat	Player	Apps	Goals	Apps	Goals	Apps	Goals	Apps	Goals	Apps	Goals
1	GK	(England) ENG	Joe Wright	1	0	0+0	0	0+0	0	1+0	0	0+0	0
4	DF	(England) ENG	Danny Collinge	47	3	43+0	3	1+0	0	1+0	0	0+2	0
5	DF	(England) ENG	Adam Senior	50	8	45+1	7	1+0	0	1+0	0	2+0	1
6	MF	(Republic of Ireland) IRL	Emmanuel Osadebe	13	2	1+8	1	0+0	0	1+0	0	3+0	1
7	FW	(England) ENG	Diallang Jaiyesimi	15	1	3+12	1	0+0	0	0+0	0	0+0	0
8	FW	(Antigua and Barbuda) ANT	Rhys Browne	14	1	3+10	0	0+0	0	0+1	1	0+0	0
10	FW	(England) ENG	Callum Stead	37	15	30+4	13	1+0	1	0+0	0	2+0	1
11	FW	(Sierra Leone) SLE	Idris Kanu	47	2	42+3	2	1+0	0	1+0	0	0+0	0
12	FW	(England) ENG	Oliver Hawkins	40	3	7+30	3	0+1	0	0+0	0	1+1	0
13	GK	(Wales) WAL	Owen Evans	6	0	3+0	0	1+0	0	0+0	0	2+0	0
14	FW	(England) ENG	Ronnie Stutter	2	0	0+1	0	0+1	0	0+0	0	0+0	0
15	FW	(England) ENG	Ryan Glover	50	4	46+0	4	1+0	0	1+0	0	0+2	0
16	MF	(England) ENG	Ben Winterburn	25	0	10+11	0	0+1	0	0+0	0	3+0	0
17	FW	(England) ENG	Jack Howland	4	0	1+3	0	0+0	0	0+0	0	0+0	0
18	MF	(England) ENG	Anthony Hartigan	35	1	21+11	1	0+1	0	1+0	0	1+0	0
19	MF	(England) ENG	Mark Shelton	43	8	34+6	8	1+0	0	1+0	0	1+0	0
20	FW	(England) ENG	Kabongo Tshimanga	21	12	21+0	12	0+0	0	0+0	0	0+0	0
22	DF	(England) ENG	Phillip Chinedu	17	2	6+11	2	0+0	0	0+0	0	0+0	0
23	DF	(England) ENG	Kane Smith	33	0	12+17	0	1+0	0	0+1	0	2+0	0
24	DF	(England) ENG	Romoney Crichlow	22	1	18+0	1	0+1	0	0+0	0	2+1	0
25	DF	(Croatia) CRO	Nikola Tavares	39	0	35+2	0	1+0	0	0+0	0	0+1	0
27	FW	(Democratic Republic of the Congo) COD	Britt Assombalonga	18	2	5+11	1	1+0	0	0+0	0	1+0	1
28	MF	(Nigeria) NGR	Nnamdi Ofoborh	46	5	40+3	5	1+0	0	0+0	0	0+2	0
29	GK	(Scotland) SCO	Cieran Slicker	44	0	43+0	0	0+0	0	0+0	0	1+0	0
30	DF	(England) ENG	Joe Kizzi	19	2	11+8	2	0+0	0	0+0	0	0+0	0
33	FW	(England) ENG	Bright Siaw	1	0	0+0	0	0+0	0	0+0	0	0+1	0
35	MF	(England) ENG	Dennis Adeniran	14	1	1+9	1	0+0	0	0+1	0	3+0	0
Players who featured but departed the club during the season:
3	DF	(England) ENG	Ryan Galvin	13	1	3+6	0	0+0	0	0+1	1	3+0	0
7	MF	(Scotland) SCO	Scott High	6	0	1+2	0	0+0	0	0+1	0	2+0	0
9	FW	(Zimbabwe) ZIM	Lee Ndlovu	22	4	14+6	3	0+0	0	0+0	0	1+1	1
17	FW	(England) ENG	Zak Brunt	4	0	1+2	0	0+0	0	1+0	0	0+0	0
20	FW	(England) ENG	Joe Hugill	6	0	2+3	0	0+0	0	1+0	0	0+0	0
22	DF	(England) ENG	Ollie Kensdale	10	0	4+2	0	0+0	0	1+0	0	3+0	0

=== Disciplinary record ===
Includes all competitive matches. The list is sorted by squad number when disciplinary points / points per card / number of cards are equal. Players with no cards not included in the list.

Rank	No.	Pos.	Nat.	Name	League Two			FA Cup			EFL Cup			EFL Trophy			Total		
Rank	No.	Pos.	Nat.	Name	Yellow card	Second yellow card	Red card	Yellow card	Second yellow card	Red card	Yellow card	Second yellow card	Red card	Yellow card	Second yellow card	Red card	Yellow card	Second yellow card	Red card
1	4	DF	ENG	Danny Collinge	5	0	1	0	0	0	0	0	0	0	0	0	5	0	1
1	24	DF	ENG	Romoney Crichlow	6	0	0	0	0	0	0	0	0	2	0	0	8	0	0
3	11	FW	SLE	Idris Kanu	7	0	0	0	0	0	0	0	0	0	0	0	7	0	0
3	19	MF	ENG	Mark Shelton	7	0	0	0	0	0	0	0	0	0	0	0	7	0	0
3	25	DF	CRO	Nikola Tavares	4	0	1	0	0	0	0	0	0	0	0	0	4	0	1
6	15	MF	ENG	Ryan Glover	6	0	0	0	0	0	0	0	0	0	0	0	6	0	0
6	28	MF	ENG	Nnamdi Ofoborh	4	1	0	0	0	0	0	0	0	0	0	0	4	1	0
6	29	GK	SCO	Cieran Slicker	3	0	1	0	0	0	0	0	0	0	0	0	3	0	1
9	6	MF	IRL	Emmanuel Osadebe	1	0	1	0	0	0	0	0	0	1	0	0	2	0	1
9	30	DF	ENG	Joe Kizzi	2	0	1	0	0	0	0	0	0	0	0	0	2	0	1
11	5	DF	ENG	Adam Senior	4	0	0	0	0	0	0	0	0	0	0	0	4	0	0
12	12	FW	ENG	Oliver Hawkins	3	0	0	0	0	0	0	0	0	0	0	0	3	0	0
12	16	MF	ENG	Ben Winterburn	2	0	0	0	0	0	0	0	0	1	0	0	3	0	0
12	20	FW	ENG	Kabongo Tshimanga	3	0	0	0	0	0	0	0	0	0	0	0	3	0	0
12	23	DF	ENG	Kane Smith	3	0	0	0	0	0	0	0	0	0	0	0	3	0	0
16	9	FW	ZIM	Lee Ndlovu	2	0	0	0	0	0	0	0	0	0	0	0	2	0	0
16	18	MF	ENG	Anthony Hartigan	2	0	0	0	0	0	0	0	0	0	0	0	2	0	0
16	22	DF	ENG	Ollie Kensdale	1	0	0	0	0	0	0	0	0	1	0	0	2	0	0
19	7	MF	SCO	Scott High	1	0	0	0	0	0	0	0	0	0	0	0	1	0	0
19	8	FW	ATG	Rhys Browne	1	0	0	0	0	0	0	0	0	0	0	0	1	0	0
19	10	FW	ENG	Callum Stead	1	0	0	0	0	0	0	0	0	0	0	0	1	0	0
19	22	DF	ENG	Phillip Chinedu	1	0	0	0	0	0	0	0	0	0	0	0	1	0	0
19	35	MF	ENG	Dennis Adeniran	1	0	0	0	0	0	0	0	0	0	0	0	1	0	0
Total					70	1	5	0	0	0	0	0	0	5	0	0	75	1	5
