= Ryan Galvin =

English footballer (born 2001)

Personal information
- Full name: Ryan Patrick Francis Galvin
- Date of birth: 31 January 2001 (age 25)
- Place of birth: Kingston upon Thames, England
- Height: 6 ft 0 in (1.82 m)
- Position: Left back

Team information
- Current team: Carlisle United
- Number: 12

Youth career
- 2018–2019: Wigan Athletic

Senior career*
Years	Team	Apps	(Gls)
2019–2020	Wigan Athletic	0	(0)
2019	→ Stafford Rangers (loan)	0	(0)
2020–2023	Sheffield Wednesday	0	(0)
2021–2022	→ Gloucester City (loan)	19	(0)
2022–2023	→ Maidstone United (loan)	24	(1)
2023–2025	FC Halifax Town	70	(2)
2025–2026	Barnet	9	(0)
2025–2026	→ Rochdale (loan)	5	(0)
2026–	Carlisle United	18	(2)
- * Club domestic league appearances and goals as of 11:53, 5 June 2026 (UTC)

Ryan Francis Patrick Galvin (born 31 January 2001) is an English professional footballer who plays as a defender for National League club Carlisle United.

== Career ==
=== Early career ===
Galvin started his career at Wigan Athletic in July 2018, and joined Stafford Rangers on loan in November 2019.

=== Sheffield Wednesday ===
He joined Sheffield Wednesday on a free transfer in January 2020 following a trial period at the club. He was named in the Sheffield Wednesday starting line-up for his debut on 9 January 2021 in an FA Cup third round match away to Exeter City. A one year option was activated in his contract on 12 May 2021, keeping him at the club until the summer of 2022. On 13 August 2021, he joined Gloucester City on a one-mouth loan deal, with the possibility to extend. On 13 September, Galvin would sign a new deal at Sheffield Wednesday until the summer of 2023, and remain on loan with Gloucester City until January 2022.

On 13 September 2022, Galvin joined Maidstone United on an initial two month loan spell. He would win the player-of-the-month award for October during his loan spell. His loan spell was extended further on the 11 November and 16 December by additional months. It was confirmed on 13 January 2023 that his loan would be until the end of the season. Following Sheffield Wednesday promotion back to the EFL Championship it was confirmed that Galvin would be released following the end of his contract.

=== FC Halifax Town ===
On 21 June 2023, Galvin joined FC Halifax Town. In two seasons with the club, Galvin scored twice in 76 games for the Shaymen.

=== Barnet ===
Galvin joined newly promoted EFL League Two club Barnet for the 2025–26 season.

On 28 November 2025, Galvin returned to the National League, joining Rochdale on an initial two-month loan deal. He was recalled from his loan on 6 January 2026.

=== Carlisle United ===
On 7 January 2026, Galvin signed for Carlisle United on a two-and-a-half-year contract with the option of a third year.

== Career statistics ==
As of end of 2025–26 season

Appearances and goals by club, season and competition
Club	Season	League			FA Cup		League Cup		Other		Total	
Club	Season	Division	Apps	Goals	Apps	Goals	Apps	Goals	Apps	Goals	Apps	Goals
Stafford Rangers (loan)	2019–20	NPL Premier Division	0	0	0	0	—		1 (Note: Appearance in NPL Challenge Cup)	0	1	0
Sheffield Wednesday	2020–21	Championship	0	0	2	0	0	0	0	0	2	0
Sheffield Wednesday	2021–22	League One	0	0	0	0	0	0	0	0	0	0
Sheffield Wednesday	2022–23	League One	0	0	0	0	1	0	1 (Note: Appearance(s) in EFL Trophy)	0	2	0
Sheffield Wednesday	Total		0	0	2	0	1	0	1	0	4	0
Gloucester City (loan)	2021–22	National League North	19	0	2	0	—		2 (Note: Appearance(s) in FA Trophy)	0	23	0
Maidstone United (loan)	2022–23	National League	24	1	1	0	—		3	1	28	2
FC Halifax Town	2023–24	National League	33	0	1	0	—		1	0	35	0
FC Halifax Town	2024–25	National League	37	2	1	0	—		3 (Note: One appearance in National League Play-offs, two appearances in National League Cup)	0	41	2
FC Halifax Town	Total		70	2	2	0	0	0	4	0	76	2
Barnet	2025–26	League Two	9	0	0	0	1	1	3	0	13	1
Rochdale (loan)	2025–26	National League	5	0	—		—		1	0	6	0
Carlisle United	2025–26	National League	18	2	—		—		1 (Note: Appearance in National League Play-offs)	0	19	2
Career total			145	5	7	0	2	1	16	1	170	7
