= Danny Collinge =

English footballer (born 1998)

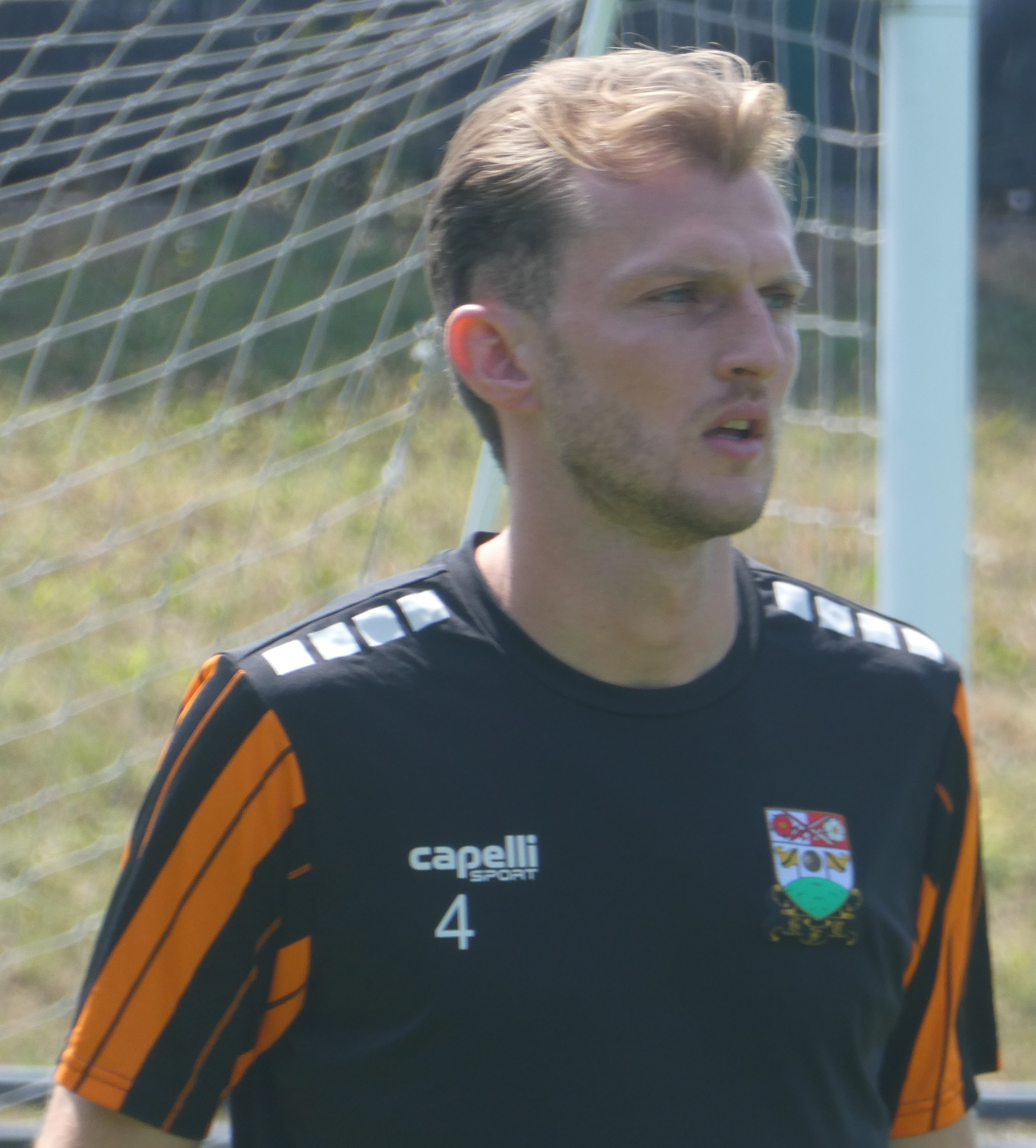
- Collinge in 2026

Personal information
- Full name: Daniele James Collinge
- Date of birth: 9 April 1998 (age 28)
- Place of birth: Haywards Heath, England
- Height: 1.86 m (6 ft 1 in)
- Position: Defender

Team information
- Current team: Barnet
- Number: 4

Youth career
- 2009–2014: Milton Keynes Dons
- 2014–2017: VfB Stuttgart

Senior career*
Years	Team	Apps	(Gls)
2017–2019	VfB Stuttgart II	15	(0)
2019–2021	Colchester United	0	(0)
2019–2020	→ Maldon & Tiptree (loan)	13	(1)
2020	→ A.F.C. Sudbury (loan)	5	(1)
2021–2022	Dover Athletic	38	(2)
2022–	Barnet	139	(16)

International career
2013–2014	England U16	11	(0)
2014–2015	England U17	21	(1)
2015–2016	England U18	3	(0)
2024	England C	1	(0)
- * Club domestic league appearances and goals as of 18:32, 2 May 2026 (UTC)

Daniele James Collinge (born 9 April 1998) is an English professional footballer who plays as a defender for EFL League Two club Barnet.

== Club career ==
Collinge began his youth career with Milton Keynes Dons in 2009. He progressed through the youth ranks and was on the bench for the first team on three occasions in March 2014 as a 15 year old. That summer, he joined VfB Stuttgart where he began playing for the under-17s. Collinge later progressed onto the under-19s and then onto the VfB Stuttgart II side playing in the Regionalliga Südwest. In June 2018, Collinge was one of 100 nominees for the Golden Boy award. However, he struggled with injuries that season, and made no appearances in the first half of the following season before leaving Stuttgart by mutual consent in January 2019.

In June 2019, Collinge signed for Colchester United on a two-year deal. He was restricted to under-23 games during his time with the Us, though he did play first-team football out on loan at Isthmian League clubs Maldon & Tiptree and A.F.C. Sudbury. He left Colchester by mutual consent in February 2021.

Collinge returned to MK Dons for pre-season training in July 2021, before signing for Dover Athletic at the end of the month after a successful trial. After 40 appearances in the 2021-22 season, Collinge was offered a new deal by the Whites following their relegation but rejected this to remain in the National League when he signed for Barnet in June 2022.

== International career ==
Collinge was capped by England at under-16, under-17 and under-18 levels. With the under-17s, he played at the 2015 UEFA European Under-17 Championship and was part of the squad for the 2015 FIFA U-17 World Cup, although did not play. He was capped once by England C in 2024.

== Career statistics ==
As of end of 2025-26 season

Appearances and goals by club, season and competition
Club	Season	League			FA Cup		League Cup		Other		Total	
Club	Season	Division	Apps	Goals	Apps	Goals	Apps	Goals	Apps	Goals	Apps	Goals
VfB Stuttgart II	2016–17	Regionalliga Südwest	2	0	0	0	0	0	0	0	2	0
VfB Stuttgart II	2017–18	Regionalliga Südwest	13	0	0	0	0	0	0	0	13	0
VfB Stuttgart II	2018–19	Regionalliga Südwest	0	0	0	0	0	0	0	0	0	0
VfB Stuttgart II	Total		15	0	0	0	0	0	0	0	15	0
Colchester United	2019–20	EFL League Two	0	0	0	0	0	0	0	0	0	0
Colchester United	2020–21	EFL League Two	0	0	0	0	0	0	0	0	0	0
Colchester United	Total		0	0	0	0	0	0	0	0	0	0
Maldon & Tiptree (loan)	2019–20	Isthmian League North Division	13	1	0	0	0	0	3 (Note: Appearance(s) in the Alan Turvey Trophy)	0	16	1
A.F.C. Sudbury (loan)	2020–21	Isthmian League North Division	5	1	0	0	0	0	0	0	5	1
Dover Athletic	2021–22	National League	38	2	2	0	—		0	0	40	2
Barnet	2022–23	National League	36	1	4	0	—		4 (Note: Three appearances in FA Trophy, one in National League playoffs)	0	44	1
Barnet	2023–24	National League	31	8	5	1	—		3 (Note: One appearance in FA Trophy, one in the Middlesex Senior Cup, one in National League playoffs)	0	39	9
Barnet	2024–25	National League	29	4	1	0	—		1 (Note: Appearance(s) in the FA Trophy)	0	31	4
Barnet	2025–26	EFL League Two	43	3	1	0	1	0	2 (Note: Appearance(s) in the EFL Trophy)	0	47	3
Barnet	Total		139	16	11	1	1	0	10	0	161	17
Career total			210	20	13	1	1	0	13	0	237	21

== Honours ==
Barnet

- National League: 2024–25

Individual

- National League Team of the Season: 2023–24, 2024–25
