= Adam Senior =

English footballer (born 2002)

- Senior in 2026

Personal information
- Full name: Adam Nicholas Senior
- Date of birth: 20 January 2002 (age 24)
- Place of birth: Bolton, England
- Position: Defender

Team information
- Current team: Barnet
- Number: 5

Youth career
- –2019: Bolton Wanderers

Senior career*
Years	Team	Apps	(Gls)
2019–2023	Bolton Wanderers	4	(0)
2021	→ Ashton United (loan)	7	(3)
2021	→ York City (loan)	4	(0)
2022	→ Chorley (loan)	5	(0)
2022–2023	→ AFC Telford United (loan)	7	(0)
2023	→ FC Halifax Town (loan)	20	(0)
2023–2025	FC Halifax Town	88	(9)
2025–	Barnet	54	(8)
- * Club domestic league appearances and goals as of 20:46, 10 October 2026 (UTC)

Adam Nicholas Senior (born 20 January 2002) is an English professional football player as a defender for EFL League Two club Barnet. He can play at both a centre-back and right-back.

== Career ==
Born in Bolton, Senior joined the youth academy of hometown club Bolton Wanderers, the club he grew up supporting. On 31 August 2019, following major financial troubles that had forced the club to utilise youth players, Senior made his first team debut in a 5–0 away loss against Gillingham. He signed his first professional deal with Bolton Wanderers on 15 May 2020, penning a one-year deal. He scored his first goal on 6 October in a 2–1 defeat against Shrewsbury Town in the EFL Trophy. On 19 May 2021 Bolton revealed he was contracted for the 2021–2022 season.

On 1 October 2021, he joined Ashton United on loan for a month. He made his debut a day later, starting in a 1–0 defeat to Warrington Town. He scored his first goal for Ashton on 9 October, earning a point for them in a 1–1 draw against Gainsborough Trinity. The loan was extended for a month on 3 November. A week later however, Bolton recalled him from his loan and sent him on loan to York City for a month instead. He made his debut a day later, helping York get a clean sheet in a 0–0 draw against Curzon Ashton. He was recalled from the loan on 9 December and started the next Bolton match two days later in a 1–0 loss against Accrington Stanley. On 25 January 2022, he joined Chorley on loan until the end of the season. He made his debut the same day and was named Man of the Match in a 2–2 draw against Fylde. On 3 March, he was recalled from his loan to provide extra defensive competition due to the absence of Gethin Jones. On 3 May the club confirmed that they had offered him a new contract which he signed on 14 June. On 8 November 2022, he joined AFC Telford United on loan for a month. On 13 December, it was extended until 2 January. He impressed during this loan spell, playing a total of 9 times, with Telford wanting to extend it even further — though Bolton instead decided to recall him. Two weeks later, he joined National League side FC Halifax Town on a month's loan which was later extended for another month and then extended again to the end of the season. On 25 May 2023, he was announced as one of five B Team releases. Two weeks later, it was announced he would join Halifax on a permanent two year contract on 1 July. In total, Senior went on to score ten goals in 116 games for the Shaymen.

Senior joined newly promoted EFL League Two club Barnet for the 2025-26 season.

== Career statistics ==
As of match played 10 October 2026

Appearances and goals by club, season and competition
Club	Season	League			FA Cup		League Cup		Other		Total	
Club	Season	Division	Apps	Goals	Apps	Goals	Apps	Goals	Apps	Goals	Apps	Goals
Bolton Wanderers	2019–20	League One	2	0	0	0	0	0	2 (Note: Appearance(s) in the EFL Trophy.)	0	4	0
Bolton Wanderers	2020–21	League Two	0	0	0	0	0	0	1	1	1	1
Bolton Wanderers	2021–22	League One	2	0	0	0	0	0	0	0	2	0
Bolton Wanderers	2022–23	League One	0	0	0	0	0	0	0	0	0	0
Bolton Wanderers	Total		4	0	0	0	0	0	3	1	7	1
Ashton United (loan)	2021–22	NPL Premier Division	7	3	0	0	—		2 (Note: Appearance(s) in the Manchester Premier Cup and FA Trophy.)	0	9	3
York City (loan)	2021–22	National League North	4	0	—		—		0	0	4	0
Chorley (loan)	2021–22	National League North	5	0	—		—		0	0	5	0
AFC Telford United (loan)	2022–23	National League North	7	0	—		—		2 (Note: Appearance(s) in the FA Trophy.)	0	9	0
FC Halifax Town (loan)	2022–23	National League	20	0	—		—		—		20	0
FC Halifax Town	2023–24	National League	42	4	1	0	—		2 (Note: One appearance in the FA Trophy, one appearance in National League playoffs)	0	45	4
FC Halifax Town	2024–25	National League	46	5	1	0	—		4 (Note: One appearance in the FA Trophy, one appearance in National League playoffs, two appearances and one goal in National League Cup)	1	51	6
FC Halifax Town	Total		88	9	2	0	0	0	6	1	96	10
Barnet	2025–26	League Two	46	7	1	0	1	0	2	1	50	8
Barnet	2026–27	League Two	8	1	0	0	1	0	2	0	11	1
Barnet	Total		54	8	1	0	2	0	4	1	61	9
Career total			189	20	3	0	2	0	17	3	211	23
