= Nikola Tavares =

Footballer (born 1999)

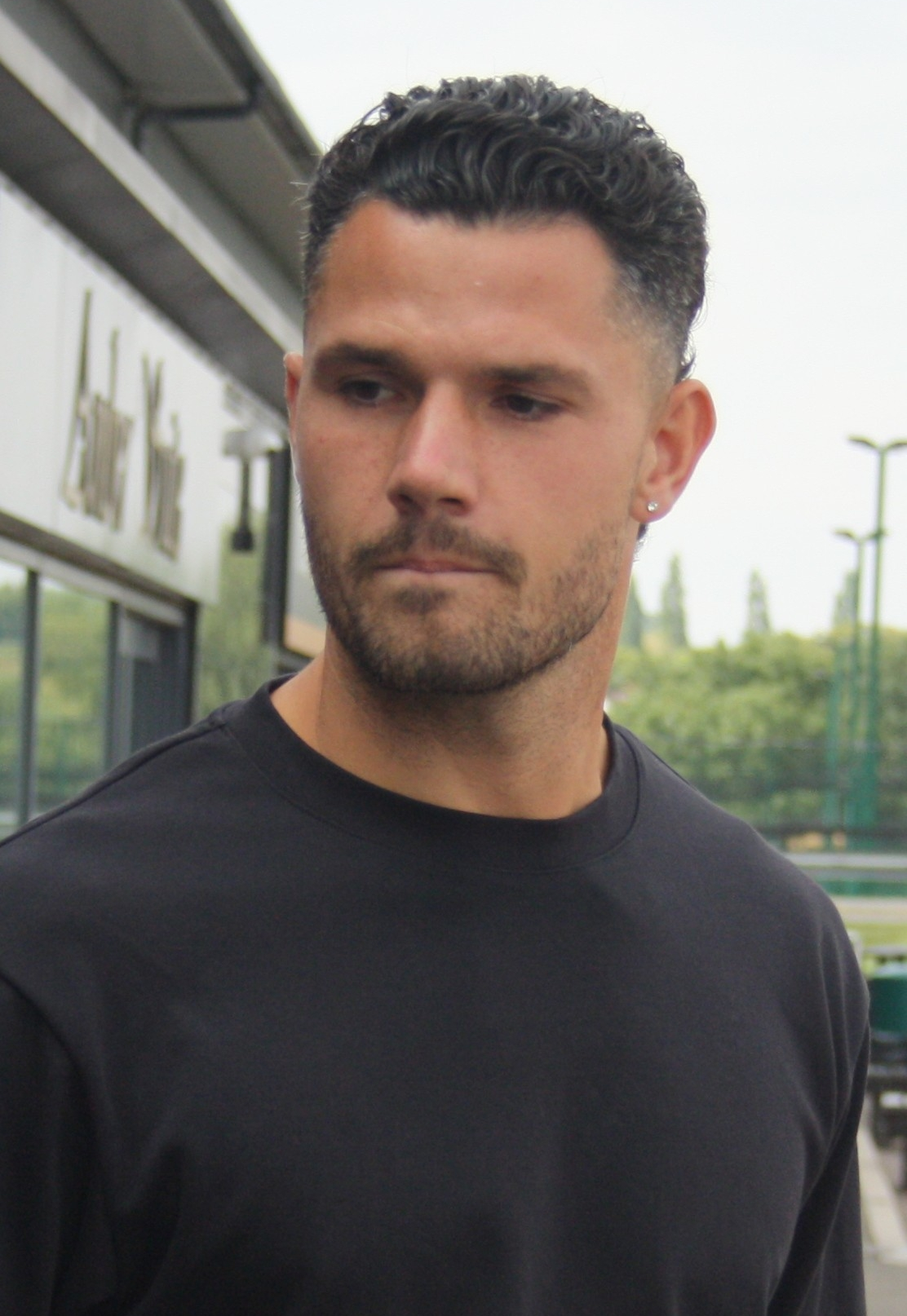
- Tavares after a Barnet match in 2026

Personal information
- Full name: Nikola Hrvatsko Tavares
- Date of birth: 17 January 1999 (age 27)
- Place of birth: Cape Town, South Africa
- Height: 1.88 m (6 ft 2 in)
- Position: Central defender

Team information
- Current team: Barnet
- Number: 25

Youth career
- Table View
- AOB
- Old Mutual Academy
- –2013: Hellenic
- 2013–2016: Brentford
- 2016–2019: Crystal Palace

Senior career*
Years	Team	Apps	(Gls)
2019–2021	Crystal Palace	0	(0)
2021–2022	Wealdstone	27	(1)
2022–2024	Dagenham & Redbridge	37	(0)
2024–	Barnet	75	(1)

International career
2017	Croatia U18	2	(0)
2017	Croatia U19	1	(0)
2018–2019	Croatia U20	3	(0)
- * Club domestic league appearances and goals as of 13:07, 9 August 2026 (UTC)

Nikola Hrvatsko Tavares (born 17 January 1999) is a professional footballer who plays as a central defender for EFL League Two club Barnet. Born in South Africa, he is a former Croatia youth international.

Tavares is a product of the Crystal Palace and Brentford academies and began his senior career in non-League football with National League clubs Wealdstone and Dagenham & Redbridge. He transferred to Barnet in 2024.

== Club career ==
=== Youth years ===
A central defender, Tavares began his career in youth football in Cape Town, before moving into the academy at English club Brentford. He was a part of the U15 team which won the Junior Globe at the 2014 Milk Cup and he progressed to sign a scholarship deal in 2015. The Brentford academy was closed at the end of the 2015–16 season and Tavares trialled unsuccessfully with the U18 teams at Middlesbrough, Wolverhampton Wanderers and Brighton & Hove Albion during the early months of the 2016–17 season. His Brentford registration was cancelled in February 2017.

=== Crystal Palace ===
Tavares joined the academy at Premier League club Crystal Palace in late 2016 and by February 2017 he had progressed to sign a professional contract to be a part of the Eagles' U23 team. In what remained of the 2016–17 season, he made 19 U23 and U18 appearances. Despite suffering an anterior cruciate ligament injury, he signed a new contract at the end of the 2017–18 season. He progressed to captain the U23 team during the 2018–19 season and was an unused substitute during the first team's final match of the campaign.

Tavares signed a new one-year contract in July 2019 and was an unused substitute on four occasions during the 2019–20 season, before suffering a quadriceps injury late in the campaign. Entering the 2020–21 season injured and out of contract, Tavares signed one-month rolling contracts in order to remain at Selhurst Park during his rehabilitation. He was released in early 2021.

=== Wealdstone ===
On 29 March 2021, Tavares joined National League club Wealdstone on a contract running until the end of the 2020–21 season. He made his debut in a league match versus Solihull Moors the following day and suffered a season-ending thigh injury 62 minutes into the 3–0 defeat. Tavares signed a new contract in July 2021 and made 27 appearances, scoring one goal, during a mid-table 2021–22 season. He turned down a new contract and departed Grosvenor Vale in June 2022.

=== Dagenham & Redbridge ===
On 10 June 2022, Tavares signed a two-year contract with National League club Dagenham & Redbridge for a compensation fee. The transfer made him a full-time player. After making six appearances during the opening month of the 2022–23 season, Tavares suffered a season-ending injury. He entered the 2023–24 season fit and ended a mid-table campaign with 32 appearances. In May 2024, the club entered discussions with Tavares over a new contract, but he elected to transfer away later that month. During two seasons at Victoria Road, Tavares made 38 appearances.

=== Barnet ===
On 17 May 2024, Tavares signed a two-year contract with National League club Barnet. He made 39 appearances and scored one goal during the National League championship-winning 2024–25 season. Tavares signed an undisclosed-length contract extension in May 2025. He made 39 appearances during the 2025–26 season, in which the club narrowly missed the League Two playoffs. Tavares signed a new two-year contract in July 2026.

== International career ==
Tavares won six caps for Croatia between U18 and U20 level. Passport issues prevented Tavares from being included in the South Africa U23 squad for two 2019 Africa U23 Cup of Nations qualifiers versus Angola in March 2019. He was named as "passport pending player" for South Africa's 2019 Africa Cup of Nations squad, but was not named in the final selection. In February 2020, Tavares was named in South Africa's preliminary squad for the 2020 Olympic Games.

== Personal life ==
Tavares was born in Cape Town, South Africa to a Portuguese father and a Croatian mother. His brother Marco is also a footballer.

== Career statistics ==
As of match played 8 August 2026

Appearances and goals by club, season and competition
Club	Season	League			FA Cup		EFL Cup		Other		Total	
Club	Season	Division	Apps	Goals	Apps	Goals	Apps	Goals	Apps	Goals	Apps	Goals
Crystal Palace	2018–19	Premier League	0	0	0	0	0	0	―		0	0
Crystal Palace	2019–20	Premier League	0	0	0	0	0	0	―		0	0
Crystal Palace	Total		0	0	0	0	0	0	―		0	0
Wealdstone	2020–21	National League	1	0	―		―		―		1	0
Wealdstone	2021–22	National League	26	1	1	0	―		0	0	27	1
Wealdstone	Total		27	1	1	0	―		0	0	28	1
Dagenham & Redbridge	2022–23	National League	6	0	0	0	―		0	0	6	0
Dagenham & Redbridge	2023–24	National League	31	0	0	0	―		3 (Note: 2 appearances in Essex Senior Cup, 1 appearance in FA Trophy)	0	34	0
Dagenham & Redbridge	Total		37	0	0	0	―		3	0	40	0
Barnet	2024–25	National League	38	1	1	0	―		0	0	39	1
Barnet	2025–26	League Two	37	0	1	0	0	0	1 (Note: Appearance in EFL Trophy)	0	39	0
Barnet	2026–27	League Two	0	0	0	0	1	0	0	0	1	0
Barnet	Total		75	0	2	0	1	0	1	0	79	0
Career total			139	2	3	0	1	0	4	0	147	2

== Honours ==
Barnet

- National League: 2024–25
