= Jack Howland =

English footballer (born 2006)

Personal information
- Full name: Jack Thomas Howland
- Date of birth: 8 August 2006 (age 20)
- Place of birth: Surrey, England
- Position: Winger

Team information
- Current team: Millwall
- Number: 47

Youth career
- 2014–2025: Millwall

Senior career*
Years	Team	Apps	(Gls)
2025–	Millwall	0	(0)
2026	→ Barnet (loan)	4	(0)
- * Club domestic league appearances and goals as of 12:08, 26 June 2026 (UTC)

Jack Thomas Howland (born 8 August 2006) is an English footballer who plays as a winger for EFL Championship club Millwall.

== Career ==
Howland joined the Millwall academy at under-9s level, progressing through the academy to sign a first professional contract in July 2024.

On 26 August 2025, he made his senior debut for the Lions in a 2–1 EFL Cup Second Round victory over Coventry City. In December 2025, he signed a new long-term deal with the Lions.

On 3 February 2026, Howland joined League Two club Barnet on loan for the remainder of the 2025–26 season.

== Career statistics ==
As of match played 24 February 2026

Appearances and goals by club, season and competition
Club	Season	League			FA Cup		League Cup		Other		Total	
Club	Season	Division	Apps	Goals	Apps	Goals	Apps	Goals	Apps	Goals	Apps	Goals
Millwall	2025–26	Championship	0	0	1	0	2	0	—		3	0
Barnet (loan)	2025–26	League Two	4	0	0	0	0	0	0	0	4	0
Career total			4	0	1	0	2	0	0	0	7	0
