= Ollie Kensdale =

English footballer (born 2000)

Personal information
- Full name: Oliver James Kensdale
- Date of birth: 20 April 2000 (age 26)
- Place of birth: Colchester, England
- Height: 6 ft 3 in (1.91 m)
- Positions: Centre-back; central midfielder

Team information
- Current team: Boreham Wood
- Number: 25

Youth career
- 2008–2017: Colchester United

Senior career*
Years	Team	Apps	(Gls)
2017–2021	Colchester United	3	(0)
2017	→ Maldon & Tiptree (loan)	4	(0)
2018	→ Maldon & Tiptree (loan)	3	(0)
2018	→ Maldon & Tiptree (loan)	6	(2)
2019	→ Bath City (loan)	5	(0)
2020	→ Braintree Town (loan)	2	(0)
2021	Concord Rangers	14	(0)
2021–2024	Southend United	103	(2)
2024–2025	Eastbourne Borough	32	(0)
2025–2026	Barnet	6	(0)
2026–	Boreham Wood	0	(0)

International career
2024	England C	1	(0)
- * Club domestic league appearances and goals as of 17:10, 9 January 2026 (UTC)

Oliver James Kensdale, born 20 April 2000, is an English footballer. He plays as a centre-back or central midfielder for Boreham Wood.

== Career ==
Born in Colchester, Kensdale joined the Development Centre at hometown club Colchester United at age seven. He enrolled in the club's Academy two years later. A former pupil at Colchester's St Benedict's Catholic College, he signed on as a scholar at the club in July 2016.

Kensdale joined Isthmian League, North Division side Maldon & Tiptree for his first game. He made his club debut on 30 September 2017 in the Jammers' 4–2 win against Tilbury. He made four league appearances and two appearances in the FA Trophy for the club. He played a three more games for the club on loan in March 2018.

At the end of his scholarship, Kensdale was offered a professional contract with Colchester in May 2018.

Kensdale rejoined Maldon & Tiptree in a third loan spell early in the 2018–19 season. He scored his first goal in senior football in his final appearance for the Jammers, a 3–2 win at Dereham Town on 10 November 2018, scoring twice.

On 13 November 2018, Kensdale made his first-team debut in Colchester's EFL Trophy game against Cambridge United. He then started in Colchester's League Two 1–1 draw with Exeter City at the Colchester Community Stadium on 24 November 2018.

After becoming the first Colchester United player born after 2000, Kensdale signed his first professional contract on 24 December 2018, committing until summer 2021.

On 11 October 2019, Kensdale joined National League South side Bath City in a month-long loan deal. He made his debut on 12 October 2019 in Bath's 1–1 home draw with Maidstone United.

In October 2020, Kensdale joined National League South side Braintree Town, where he made his debut in their 1–0 defeat at Chippenham Town.

Colchester announced that Kensdale was one of seven under-23 players who had their contract terminated by mutual consent on 1 February 2021.

On 14 February 2021, Kensdale joined National League South side Concord Rangers.

On 31 December 2021, Kensdale joined National League side Southend United for an undisclosed fee.

On 20 September 2024, it was announced that Southend United had terminated Kensdale's contract with no further comments to be made. He scored twice in 110 appearances for the Shrimpers.

On 2 November 2024, Kensdale joined National League South side Eastbourne Borough, making 35 appearances as they made the division's playoffs.

On 23 May 2025, Kensdale agreed to join newly promoted League Two side Barnet on a two-year deal.

On 9 January 2026, Kensdale signed for National League side Boreham Wood.

== Style of play ==
Kensdale operates as either a centre-back or central midfielder. Prior to his scholarship, he refined himself into a commanding centre-back and as a leader of the defensive line.

== Career statistics ==
As of 9 January 2026

Appearances and goals by club, season and competition
Club	Season	League			FA Cup		League Cup		Other		Total	
Club	Season	Division	Apps	Goals	Apps	Goals	Apps	Goals	Apps	Goals	Apps	Goals
Colchester United	2017–18	League Two	0	0	0	0	0	0	0	0	0	0
Colchester United	2018–19	League Two	2	0	0	0	0	0	1 (Note: Appearance(s) in EFL Trophy)	0	3	0
Colchester United	2019–20	League Two	1	0	0	0	0	0	1	0	2	0
Colchester United	2020–21	League Two	0	0	0	0	0	0	1	0	1	0
Colchester United	Total		3	0	0	0	0	0	3	0	6	0
Maldon & Tiptree (loan)	2017–18	Isthmian League North Division	7	0	0	0	–		2 (Note: Appearance(s) in FA Trophy)	0	9	0
Maldon & Tiptree (loan)	2018–19	Isthmian League North Division	6	2	1	0	–		0	0	7	2
Maldon & Tiptree (loan)	Total		13	2	1	0	–		2	0	16	2
Bath City (loan)	2019–20	National League South	5	0	0	0	–		0	0	5	0
Braintree Town (loan)	2020–21	National League South	2	0	0	0	–		0	0	2	0
Concord Rangers	2020–21	National League South	1	0	0	0	–		0	0	1	0
Concord Rangers	2021–22	National League South	13	0	2	0	–		0	0	15	0
Concord Rangers	Total		14	0	2	0	0	0	0	0	16	0
Southend United	2021–22	National League	15	0	0	0	–		1	0	16	0
Southend United	2022–23	National League	45	1	1	0	–		3	0	49	1
Southend United	2023–24	National League	40	1	1	0	–		1	0	42	1
Southend United	2024–25	National League	3	0	0	0	–		0	0	3	0
Southend United	Total		103	2	2	0	0	0	5	0	110	2
Eastbourne Borough	2024–25	National League South	32	0	0	0	–		3 (Note: One appearance in National League South play-offs, two appearances in FA Trophy)	0	35	0
Barnet	2025–26	League Two	6	0	0	0	1	0	3	0	10	0
Career total			178	4	5	0	1	0	16	0	199	4

== Honours ==
Individual

- National League South Team of the Season: 2024–25
