= Romoney Crichlow =

English footballer (born 1999)

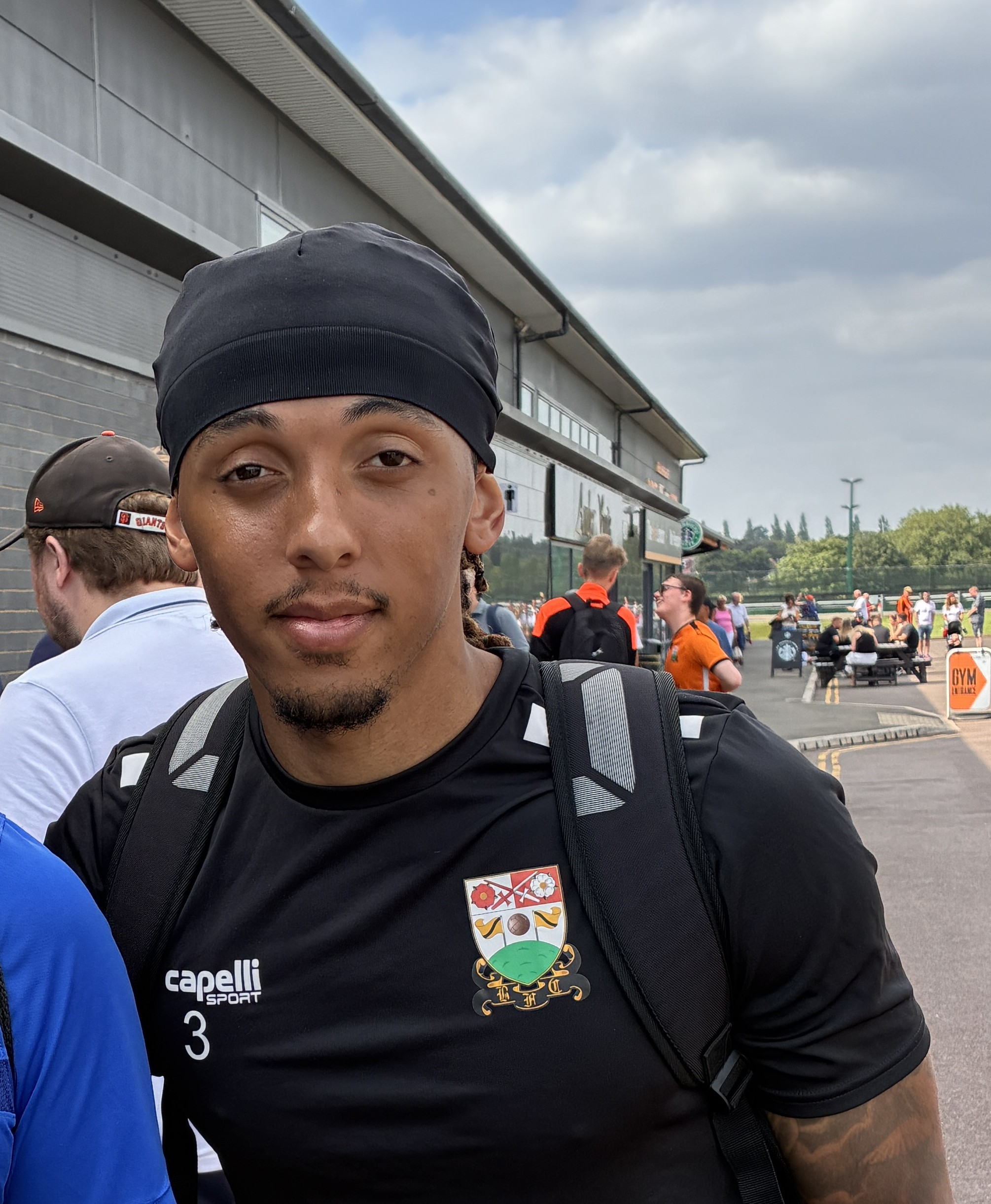
- Crichlow in 2026.

Personal information
- Full name: Romoney Mylier Taylor Crichlow-Noble
- Date of birth: 3 June 1999 (age 27)
- Place of birth: Luton, England
- Height: 1.87 m (6 ft 2 in)
- Position: Defender

Team information
- Current team: Barnet
- Number: 3

Senior career*
Years	Team	Apps	(Gls)
2016–2017	Enfield Borough	18	(3)
2017–2023	Huddersfield Town	4	(0)
2018–2019	→ Bradford (Park Avenue) (loan)	7	(0)
2019	→ Hartlepool United (loan)	2	(0)
2020	→ Welling United (loan)	6	(1)
2021–2022	→ Swindon Town (loan)	18	(1)
2022	→ Plymouth Argyle (loan)	3	(0)
2022–2023	→ Bradford City (loan)	32	(1)
2023–2025	Peterborough United	22	(0)
2024	→ Dagenham & Redbridge (loan)	10	(1)
2025	Bradford City	10	(1)
2025–	Barnet	18	(1)
- * Club domestic league appearances and goals as of 19:07, 2 May 2026 (UTC)

Romoney Mylier Taylor Crichlow-Noble (born 3 June 1999) is an English professional footballer who plays as a defender for EFL League Two club Barnet.

== Career ==
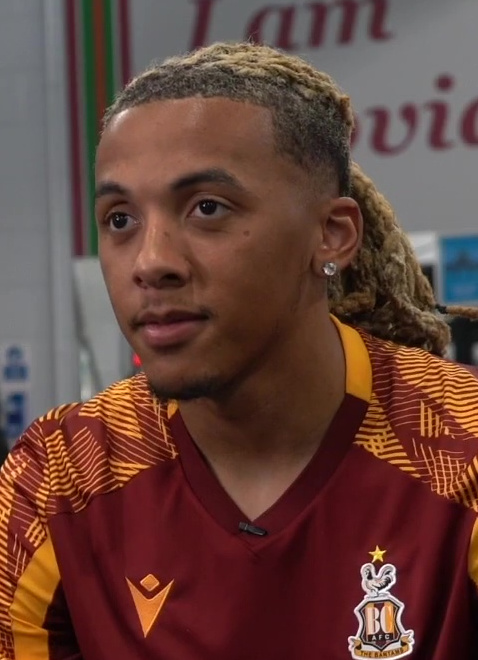
Crichlow pictured during his time at Bradford City.

Born in Luton, Crichlow-Noble started out at Enfield Borough whilst studying at the Dynamic Football Academy. He moved to Huddersfield Town in 2017. He moved on loan to Bradford (Park Avenue), Hartlepool United and Welling United in 2019 and 2020.

In July 2020, he signed a new one-year deal. Crichlow made his senior debut for Huddersfield on 5 September 2020, when he played in their EFL Cup defeat against Rochdale. He scored his first goal for the club on 9 January 2021 in a 3–2 FA Cup defeat to Plymouth Argyle.

On 6 August 2021, Crichlow joined EFL League Two side Swindon Town on a season-long loan He was recalled by Huddersfield on 13 January 2022.

On the same day he was recalled from Swindon, he was sent on loan to EFL League One side Plymouth Argyle for the remainder of the season.

On 21 June 2022, Crichlow joined EFL League Two side Bradford City on a season long loan. He scored his first league goal for the Bantams in a 2–1 victory away at Northampton Town.

On 27 June 2023, Crichlow signed a two-year deal with EFL League One side Peterborough United. He was a member of the Peterborough side that won the EFL Trophy in the 2023–24 season, coming on as a substitute in stoppage time during the final held at Wembley Stadium.

On 12 May 2024 the club announced he had been placed on the transfer list.

On 3 October 2024, he signed on loan for National League club Dagenham & Redbridge until January 2025.

In February 2025, he re-joined Bradford on a contract until the end of the season. He was released by Bradford City at the end of the 2024–25 season.

He joined Barnet for the 2025-26 season.

== Personal life ==
His mother, Natalie Crichlow, died on 6 August 2019 in Barbados having been attacked. He thanked Hartlepool United fans for their support following his mother's death.

== Career statistics ==
As of end of 2025-26 season

Appearances and goals by club, season and competition
Club	Season	League			FA Cup		EFL Cup		Other		Total	
Club	Season	Division	Apps	Goals	Apps	Goals	Apps	Goals	Apps	Goals	Apps	Goals
Huddersfield Town	2018–19	Premier League	0	0	0	0	0	0	—		0	0
Huddersfield Town	2019–20	Championship	0	0	—		0	0	—		0	0
Huddersfield Town	2020–21	Championship	4	0	1	1	1	0	—		6	1
Huddersfield Town	2021–22	Championship	0	0	—		—		—		0	0
Huddersfield Town	2022–23	Championship	0	0	—		—		—		0	0
Huddersfield Town	Total		4	0	1	1	1	0	—		6	1
Bradford Park Avenue (loan)	2018–19	National League North	7	0	—		—		—		7	0
Hartlepool United (loan)	2019–20	National League	2	0	1	0	—		1 (Note: Appearance(s) in FA Trophy)	0	4	0
Welling United (loan)	2019–20	National League North	6	1	—		—		—		6	1
Swindon Town (loan)	2021–22	League Two	18	1	2	0	1	0	3 (Note: Appearance(s) in the EFL Trophy)	1	24	2
Plymouth Argyle (loan)	2021–22	League One	3	0	—		—		—		3	0
Bradford City (loan)	2022–23	League Two	34	1	1	0	2	0	4 (Note: Two appearances in the EFL Trophy, two in the EFL League Two play-offs)	0	41	1
Peterborough United	2023–24	League One	22	0	3	0	1	0	6	0	32	0
Peterborough United	2024–25	League One	0	0	—		1	0	—		1	0
Peterborough United	Total		22	0	3	0	2	0	6	0	33	0
Dagenham & Redbridge (loan)	2024–25	National League	10	1	3	0	—		2 (Note: One appearance in the FA Trophy, one in the National League Cup)	0	15	1
Bradford City	2024–25	League Two	10	1	—		—		2	0	12	1
Barnet	2025–26	League Two	18	1	1	0	—		3	0	22	1
Career total			133	6	12	1	6	0	21	1	173	8

== Honours ==
Peterborough United

- EFL Trophy: 2023–24
