= Cieran Slicker =

Scottish footballer (born 2002)

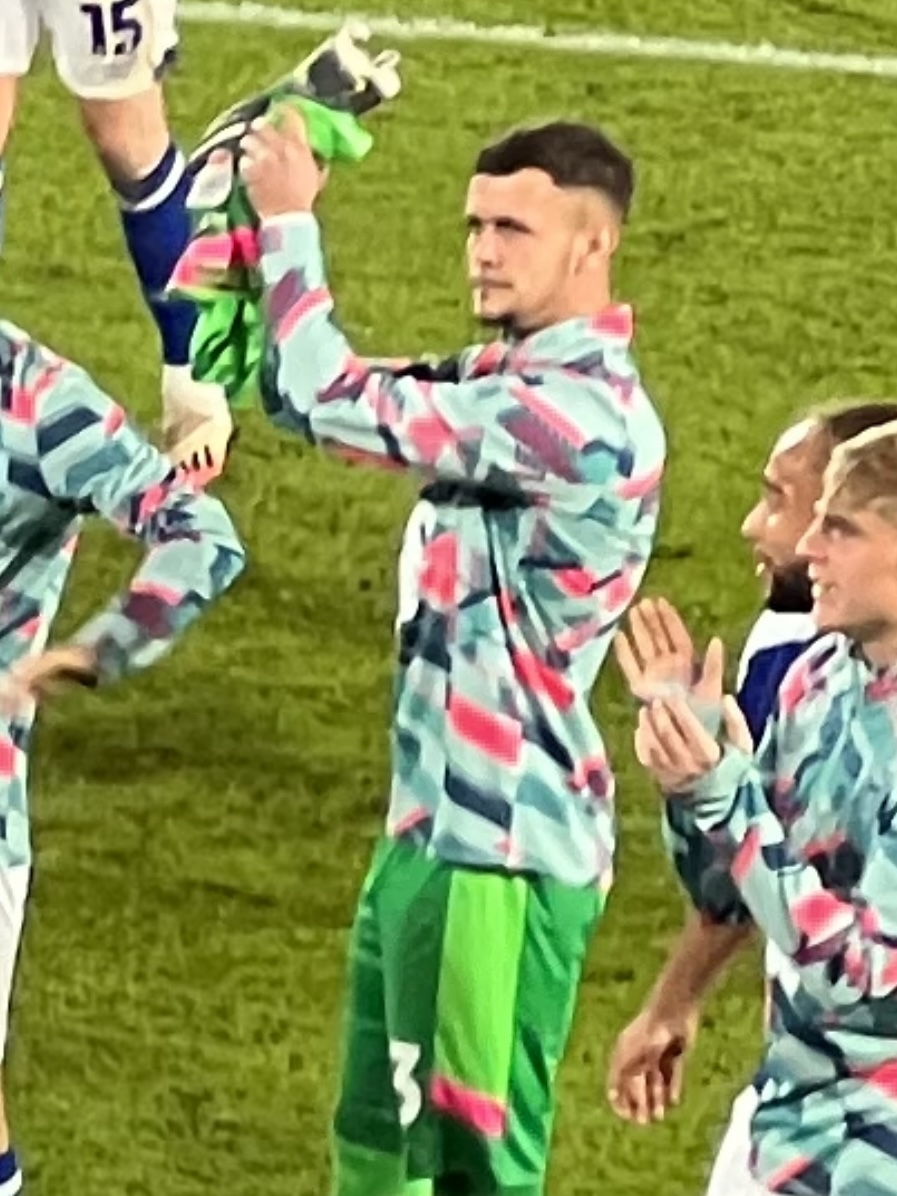
- Slicker with Ipswich Town in 2023

Personal information
- Full name: Cieran Peter Slicker
- Date of birth: 15 September 2002 (age 24)
- Place of birth: Oldham, England
- Height: 6 ft 3 in (1.91 m)
- Position: Goalkeeper

Team information
- Current team: Barnsley (on loan from Ipswich Town)
- Number: 1

Youth career
- 2010–2022: Manchester City

Senior career*
Years	Team	Apps	(Gls)
2022–2023	Manchester City	0	(0)
2022–2023	→ Rochdale (loan)	0	(0)
2023–	Ipswich Town	0	(0)
2025–2026	→ Barnet (loan)	43	(0)
2026–	→ Barnsley (loan)	5	(0)

International career^{‡}
2019	Scotland U17	3	(0)
2019	Scotland U18	1	(0)
2021–	Scotland U21	17	(0)
2025–	Scotland	1	(0)
- * Club domestic league appearances and goals as of 07:26, 21 November 2026 (UTC) ‡ National team caps and goals as of 22:19, 6 June 2025

Cieran Peter Slicker (born 15 September 2002) is a professional footballer who plays as a goalkeeper for EFL League One club Barnsley on loan from Premier League club Ipswich Town. Born in England, he plays for the Scotland national team.

Slicker began his career with Premier League club Manchester City before moving to Ipswich Town in 2023. and has played on loan for Rochdale, Barnet, and Barnsley.

Born in England, Slicker is a Scotland international, being capped at under-17, under-18, under-21 and senior levels.

== Club career ==
=== Manchester City ===
Born in Oldham, Greater Manchester, Slicker played youth football with Manchester City. He made his professional debut for the club's under-21 team in an EFL Trophy draw against Lincoln City on 17 November 2020.

On 15 November 2021, Slicker was named as a substitute for the first team in a 6–3 victory over RB Leipzig in the UEFA Champions League. Manager Pep Guardiola also named him as his substitute on five occasions in both League and Cup during the 2021–22 season.

In July 2022 Slicker signed for EFL League Two side Rochdale on loan for the 2022–23 season. He made his Rochdale debut on 9 August 2022 in the club's 2–0 victory over Burton Albion in the EFL Cup. On 11 January 2023, Slicker was recalled by Manchester City, having made three appearances for Rochdale, two in the EFL Cup and one in the EFL Trophy.

=== Ipswich Town ===
In July 2023 he signed for Ipswich Town for an undisclosed fee, signing a three-year contract. On 1 October 2024, Ipswich announced that Slicker had signed a new four-year contract lasting until 2028.

Slicker joined Barnet on a season-long loan on 7 August 2025.

On 13 July 2026, Slicker joined League One club Barnsley on loan for the 2026–27 season.

== International career ==
Slicker is eligible to represent Scotland because of his Glaswegian father. He is a Scottish youth international, having been capped at under-17, under-18 and under-21 levels.

He was called up to the senior Scotland squad for the first time on 4 November 2024. Slicker made his senior debut for Scotland against Iceland on 6 June 2025, coming on as substitute in the seventh minute to replace the injured Angus Gunn. He was criticised for his performance as Scotland lost 3–1.

== Career statistics ==
=== Club ===
As of match played 20 November 2026

Appearances and goals by club, season and competition
Club	Season	League			FA Cup		EFL Cup		Other		Total	
Club	Season	Division	Apps	Goals	Apps	Goals	Apps	Goals	Apps	Goals	Apps	Goals
Manchester City U21	2020–21	—	—		—		—		2 (Note: Appearance(s) in EFL Trophy)	0	2	0
Manchester City U21	2021–22	—	—		—		—		3	0	3	0
Manchester City U21	Total		—		—		—		5	0	5	0
Manchester City	2022–23	Premier League	0	0	0	0	0	0	0	0	0	0
Rochdale (loan)	2022–23	League Two	0	0	0	0	2	0	1	0	3	0
Ipswich Town	2023–24	Championship	0	0	0	0	2	0	—		2	0
Ipswich Town	2024–25	Premier League	0	0	1	0	0	0	—		1	0
Ipswich Town	2025–26	Championship	0	0	0	0	0	0	—		0	0
Ipswich Town	2026–27	Premier League	0	0	0	0	0	0	—		0	0
Ipswich Town	Total		0	0	1	0	2	0	0	0	3	0
Barnet (loan)	2025–26	League Two	43	0	0	0	0	0	1	0	44	0
Barnsley (loan)	2026–27	League One	5	0	1	0	0	0	0	0	6	0
Career total			48	0	2	0	4	0	7	0	61	0

=== International ===
As of match played 6 June 2025

Appearances and goals by national team and year
National team	Year	Apps	Goals
Scotland
Scotland	2025	1	0
Total		1	0
