= Mark Shelton (footballer) =

English footballer (born 1996)

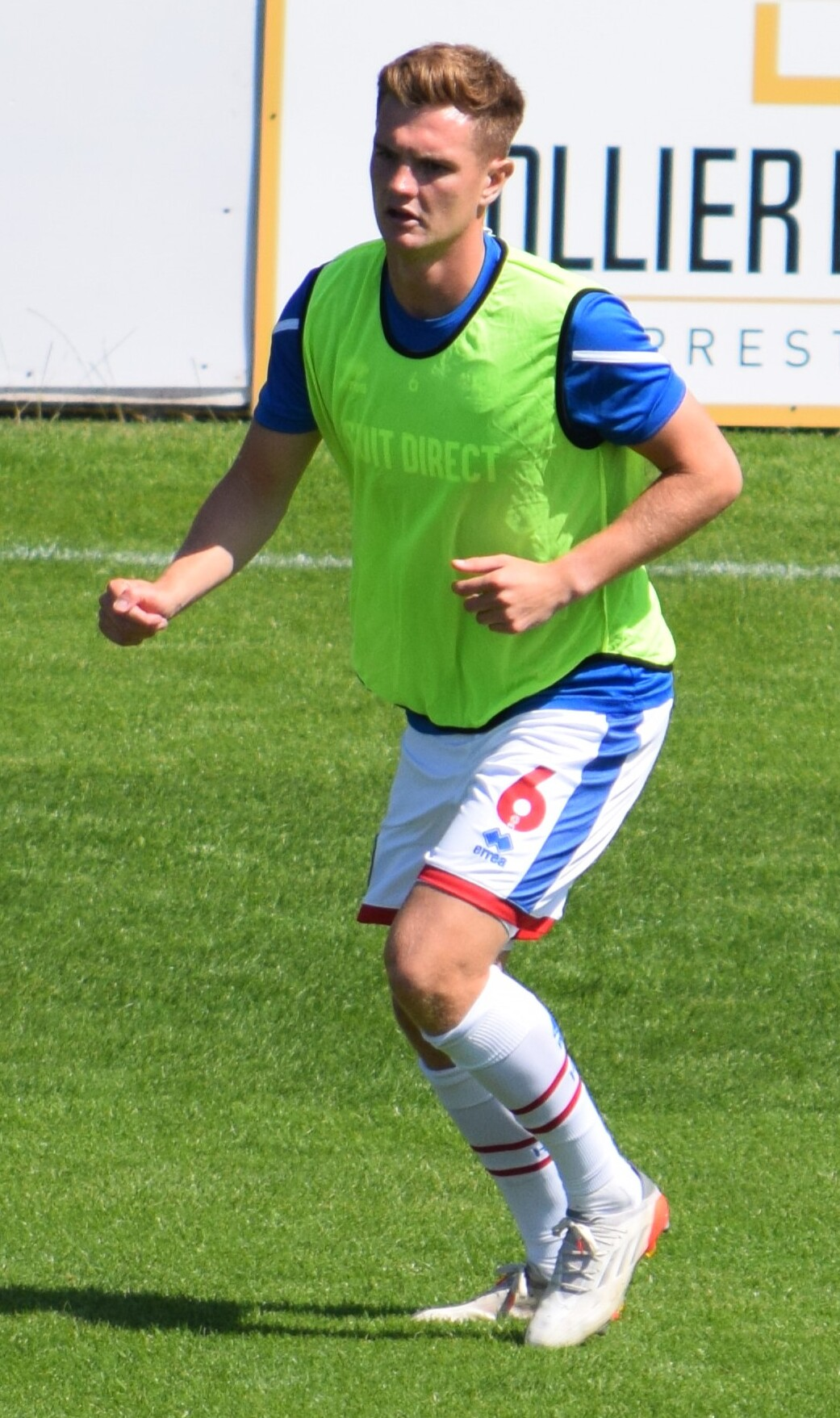
- Shelton warming up for Hartlepool United in 2022

Personal information
- Full name: Mark John Shelton
- Date of birth: 12 September 1996 (age 30)
- Place of birth: Nottingham, England
- Height: 6 ft 0 in (1.83 m)
- Position: Midfielder

Team information
- Current team: Grimsby Town (on loan from York City)
- Number: 29

Youth career
- Nottingham Forest
- –2015: Burton Albion

Senior career*
Years	Team	Apps	(Gls)
2015–2016	Burton Albion	0	(0)
2016	→ Loughborough Dynamo (loan)		
2016	Ilkeston	21	
2016–2017	Alfreton Town	22	(2)
2017–2020	Salford City	45	(4)
2019	→ Woking (loan)	3	(1)
2019–2020	→ Hartlepool United (loan)	14	(3)
2020–2023	Hartlepool United	82	(5)
2023–2024	Oldham Athletic	35	(2)
2024–2026	Barnet	73	(20)
2026–	York City	0	(0)
2026–	→ Grimsby Town (loan)	5	(1)
- * Club domestic league appearances and goals as of 10:59, 10 November 2026 (UTC)

Mark John Shelton (born 12 September 1996) is an English professional footballer who plays as a midfielder for EFL League Two side Grimsby Town on loan from EFL League Two club York City.

Shelton came through the ranks at Burton Albion, signing his first professional contract in May 2015. He continued his career in non-League, initially with Ilkeston and Alfreton Town. He signed for Salford City and won two back-to-back promotions with the Ammies. In his third season, Shelton had loan spells with Woking and Hartlepool United. After impressing with Hartlepool, he signed a permanent deal with them. In his first full season with the club, he won promotion via the play-offs. In January 2023, Shelton moved to Oldham Athletic. At the end of his second season with Oldham, Shelton moved to Barnet. In the 2024–25 season, Shelton was a member of the Barnet squad that won the National League title.

== Career ==
=== Burton Albion ===
Shelton came through the youth teams at Burton Albion before being awarded a professional contract with the club in May 2015.

In January 2016 he joined Loughborough Dynamo on loan until the end of the season. On his return from the loan he was released by the club.

=== Non-League ===
He then joined Ilkeston in June 2016.

In November 2016 he joined Alfreton Town.

=== Salford City ===
In June 2017 he joined Salford City after the clubs agreed a fee. In a 3–1 win against Boreham Wood, Shelton scored a goal which would later be voted as Salford's goal of the season. On 11 May 2019, Shelton was a substitute in the 68th minute for Salford in their 3–0 play-off final win against AFC Fylde at Wembley. After two seasons helping the club to successive promotions to the English Football League, he made his league debut for the club on 3 August 2019 in the club's first game in the league against Stevenage.

==== Woking and Hartlepool United loans ====
On 11 October 2019, Shelton returned to the National League, to join Woking on a three-month loan. A day later, he went on to score on his debut during a 2–2 draw with Barnet, netting Woking's second in the 53rd minute. On 16 November 2019, it was confirmed by manager, Alan Dowson that Shelton's loan spell had been terminated, following limited game-time opportunities.

In December 2019 he went out on loan to Hartlepool United. Shelton made his league Hartlepool debut in a 1–0 victory against Dagenham & Redbridge and scored his first goal in a 2–1 win against Eastleigh.

=== Hartlepool United ===
After a successful loan spell at the North East club, Hartlepool made the deal permanent on 1 August 2020, following Shelton's release from parent club Salford City. He started in the first game of the season in a 2–1 win against Aldershot Town. His first goal of the 2020–21 season came in a 1–1 draw away to FC Halifax Town. Shelton played in the 2021 National League play-off final as Hartlepool drew 1–1 with Torquay United at Ashton Gate, Bristol. During the Final, Shelton covered 22 kilometres in distance. In the resulting penalty shoot-out, Shelton scored his penalty as Hartlepool were promoted to League Two after winning 5–4 on penalties.

After a successful 2020–21 season, Shelton extended his contract with Hartlepool ahead of the 2021–22 season. In April 2022, Shelton was ruled out of the Scunthorpe United fixture after a cotton bud was stuck in his ear, forcing him to go to hospital to remove it. At the end of the 2021–22 season, Shelton's contract was extended for a further year after making 41 appearances in the previous season. Shelton made his 100th appearance for Hartlepool in September 2022. Following several first team injuries, Shelton was moved into defence and scored in a 3–3 draw with Harrogate Town.

=== Oldham Athletic ===
On 20 January 2023, Shelton signed for National League side Oldham Athletic on a deal until summer 2025.

In June 2024, Shelton had his Oldham contract terminated by mutual consent.

=== Barnet ===
On 13 June 2024, the same day as his departure from Oldham was announced, Shelton agreed to join fellow National League side Barnet. In the 2024–25 season, Shelton made 33 league appearances, scoring 12 times and assisting on 2 separate occasions as Barnet earned promotion to League Two as champions. Across two seasons, he scored twenty goals in 79 games for the Bees.

=== York City ===
On 7 May 2026, it was confirmed that Shelton would join newly-promoted EFL League Two side York City on 1 July 2026 following the expiration of his Barnet contract.

==== Loan to Grimsby ====
On 1 September 2026, Shelton joined fellow League Two side Grimsby Town on a season-long loan. He scored on his debut for the club as a substitute on 5 September 2026 in a 2–2 against Cheltenham Town.

== Career statistics ==
As of 8 November 2026

Appearances and goals by club, season and competition
Club	Season	League			FA Cup		League Cup		Other		Total	
Club	Season	Division	Apps	Goals	Apps	Goals	Apps	Goals	Apps	Goals	Apps	Goals
Burton Albion	2014–15	League Two	0	0	0	0	0	0	0	0	0	0
Burton Albion	2015–16	League One	0	0	0	0	0	0	0	0	0	0
Burton Albion	Total		0	0	0	0	0	0	0	0	0	0
Alfreton Town	2016–17	National League North	22	2	—		—		0	0	22	2
Salford City	2017–18	National League North	26	1	1	0	—		1 (Note: Appearance in FA Trophy)	0	28	1
Salford City	2018–19	National League	14	2	0	0	—		1 (Note: Appearance(s) in National League play-offs)	0	15	2
Salford City	2019–20	League Two	5	1	0	0	0	0	1 (Note: Appearance(s) in EFL Trophy)	0	6	1
Salford City	Total		45	4	1	0	0	0	3	0	49	4
Woking (loan)	2019–20	National League	3	1	1	0	—		0	0	4	1
Hartlepool United	2019–20	National League	14	3	0	0	—		0	0	14	3
Hartlepool United	2020–21	National League	36	3	0	0	—		3	0	39	3
Hartlepool United	2021–22	League Two	33	1	4	0	0	0	4	1	41	2
Hartlepool United	2022–23	League Two	13	1	1	0	1	0	2	0	17	1
Hartlepool United	Total		96	8	5	0	1	0	9	1	111	9
Oldham Athletic	2022–23	National League	20	1	0	0	—		0	0	20	1
Oldham Athletic	2023–24	National League	15	1	0	0	—		0	0	15	1
Oldham Athletic	Total		35	2	0	0	0	0	9	1	35	2
Barnet	2024–25	National League	33	12	1	0	—		2	0	36	12
Barnet	2025–26	League Two	40	8	1	0	1	0	1	0	43	8
Barnet	Total		73	20	2	0	1	0	3	0	79	20
York City	2026–27	League Two	0	0	0	0	0	0	0	0	0	0
Grimsby Town (loan)	2026–27	League Two	5	1	1	0	0	0	0	0	6	1
Career total			278	37	10	0	2	0	15	1	305	38

== Honours ==
Salford City

- National League play-offs: 2019
- National League North: 2017–18

Hartlepool United

- National League play-offs: 2021

Barnet

- National League: 2024–25
