= Ben Winterburn =

English footballer (born 2004)

Personal information
- Full name: Benjamin George Winterburn
- Date of birth: 4 September 2004 (age 22)
- Height: 6 ft 1 in (1.85 m)
- Positions: Defensive midfielder; right-back; centre-back

Team information
- Current team: Bournemouth

Youth career
- Bournemouth

Senior career*
Years	Team	Apps	(Gls)
2024–	Bournemouth	5	(0)
2023	→ AFC Totton (loan)	4	(0)
2023–2024	→ Weymouth (loan)	5	(0)
2025–2026	→ Barnet (loan)	21	(0)
- * Club domestic league appearances and goals as of 18:54, 2 May 2026 (UTC)

Benjamin George Winterburn (born 4 September 2004) is an English professional footballer who plays as a defensive midfielder or defender for Premier League side Bournemouth.

== Career ==
He is a product of the Bournemouth football academy. He spent time on loan at AFC Totton and had two spells on loan at Weymouth FC in the National League South during the 2023–24 season.

He made his Premier League debut appearing as a second-half substitute in a 2–2 draw against Fulham on 29 December 2024. He made his first start for Bournemouth on 11 January 2025 in the FA Cup against West Bromwich Albion.

On 1 September 2025, Winterburn joined Barnet on loan until the end of the 2025–26 season.

== Career statistics ==
As of end of 2025-26 season

Appearances and goals by club, season and competition
Club	Season	League			FA Cup		EFL Cup		Other		Total	
Club	Season	Division	Apps	Goals	Apps	Goals	Apps	Goals	Apps	Goals	Apps	Goals
Bournemouth	2024–25	Premier League	4	0	2	0	0	0	—		6	0
Bournemouth	2025–26	Premier League	1	0	0	0	0	0	—		1	0
Bournemouth	Total		5	0	2	0	0	0	—		7	0
AFC Totton (loan)	2023–24	SFL Premier Division South	4	0	3	0	0	0	1 (Note: Appearances in FA Trophy)	0	8	0
Weymouth (loan)	2023–24	National League South	5	0	0	0	0	0	0	0	5	0
Barnet (loan)	2025–26	League Two	21	0	1	0	0	0	3 (Note: Appearances in EFL Trophy)	0	24	0
Career total			35	0	5	0	0	0	4	0	44	0
