= Ronnie Stutter =

English association football player

Personal information
- Full name: Ronnie Edward Stutter
- Date of birth: 6 January 2005 (age 21)
- Place of birth: Hackney, England
- Position: Forward

Youth career
- –2019: West Ham United
- 2019–2024: Chelsea

Senior career*
Years	Team	Apps	(Gls)
2024–2026	Chelsea	0	(0)
2024	→ Burton Albion (loan)	1	(0)
2025–2026	→ Barnet (loan)	1	(0)

International career^{‡}
2019–2020	England U15	2	(0)
2021	England U16	2	(0)
2021	England U17	3	(0)
2023–2024	England U19	4	(1)
- * Club domestic league appearances and goals as of 19:15, 16 December 2025 (UTC) ‡ National team caps and goals as of 21:44, 24 March 2024 (UTC)

Ronnie Edward Stutter (born 6 January 2005) is an English footballer. He is an England youth international.

== Club career ==
Stutter was in the West Ham United academy until under-14 level, when he joined Chelsea. In January 2023, it was announced that Stutter had signed a three-year professional contract with Chelsea. He captained the Chelsea under-18 side, on occasion.

On 17 September 2023, Stutter was included in the Chelsea first-team squad, being named as a substitute for the Premier League match against AFC Bournemouth.

On 30 August 2024, Stutter joined EFL League One club Burton Albion on a season-long loan. He made his league debut for Burton on 5 October 2024 as a second-half substitute against Bristol Rovers. However, the loan was terminated on 1 January 2025.

On 2 September 2025, it was announced that Stutter had joined League Two club Barnet on a season-long loan. He made two appearances for the Bees.

At the end of the 2025–26 season, Stutter's contract with Chelsea expired. He then moved to a month-to-month contract with the Blues.

== Style of play ==
Stutter has been described as a right-footed attacking player.

== International career ==
Stutter has represented England at under-16 and under-17 level.

On 15 November 2023, Stutter made his England U19 debut during a 6–0 win over Romania in Marbella.

== Career statistics ==
As of 1 November 2025

Appearances and goals by club, season and competition
Club	Season	League			FA Cup		EFL Cup		Europe		Other		Total	
Club	Season	Division	Apps	Goals	Apps	Goals	Apps	Goals	Apps	Goals	Apps	Goals	Apps	Goals
Chelsea U21	2023–24	—			—		—		—		3 (Note: Appearances in EFL Trophy)	1	3	1
Burton Albion (loan)	2024–25	League One	1	0	0	0	0	0	—		0	0	1	0
Barnet (loan)	2025–26	League Two	1	0	1	0	0	0	—		0	0	2	0
Career total			2	0	1	0	0	0	0	0	3	1	6	1
