= Callum Stead =

English footballer (born 1999)

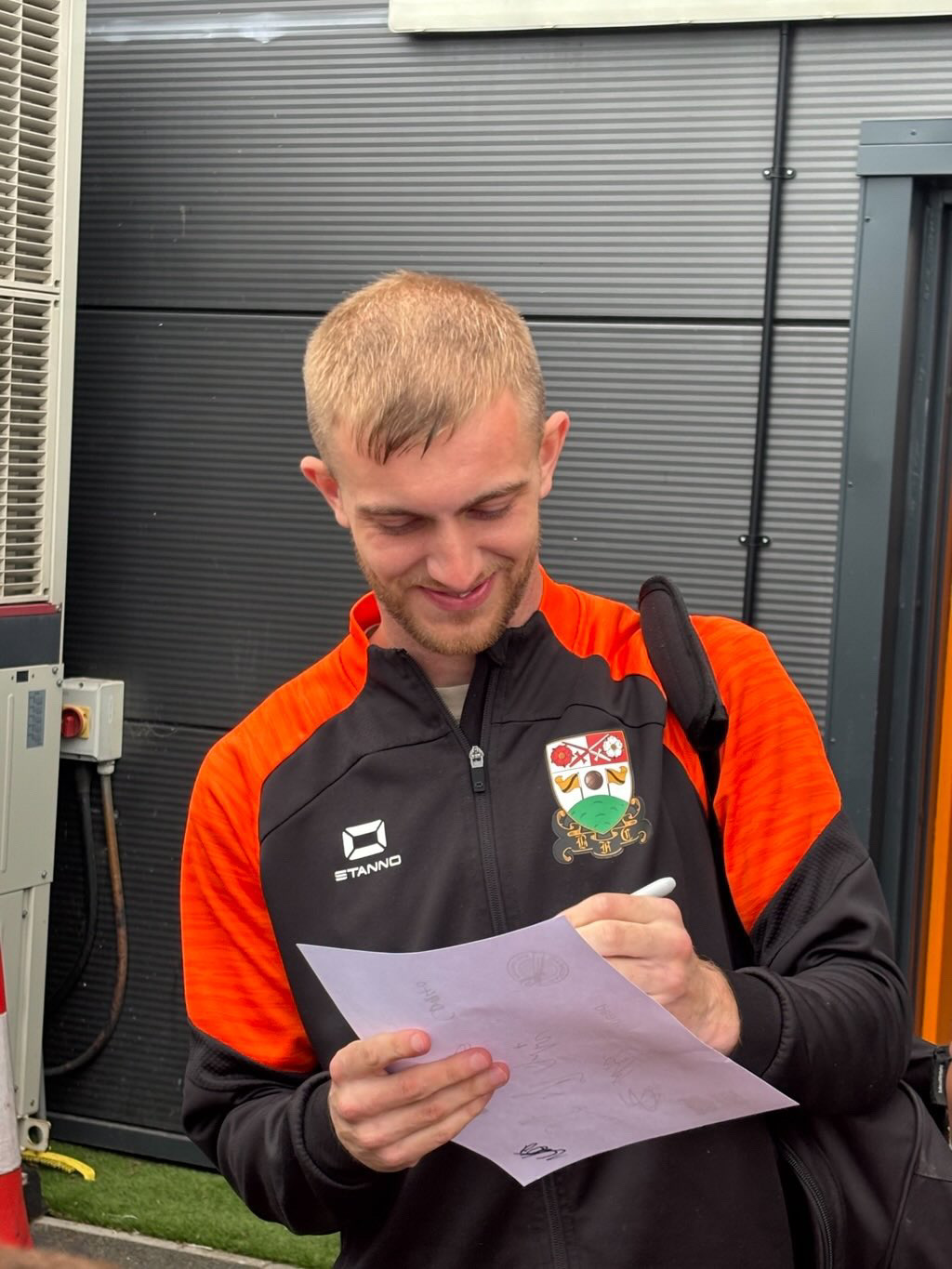
- Stead in 2025

Personal information
- Full name: Callum Lee Stead
- Date of birth: 25 December 1999 (age 26)
- Place of birth: Enfield, England
- Height: 1.81 m (5 ft 11 in)
- Position: Forward

Team information
- Current team: Cambridge United
- Number: 10

Youth career
- 2017–2018: Luton Town

Senior career*
Years	Team	Apps	(Gls)
2015–2016	Hoddesdon Town	1	(0)
2016–2017	Langford	4	(1)
2019	Biggleswade Town	3	(0)
2019–2020	Welwyn Garden City	24	(7)
2020–2021	Hitchin Town	13	(7)
2021	South Shields	4	(1)
2021–2022	Hitchin Town	15	(8)
2022	Kettering Town	19	(6)
2022–2023	Brackley Town	46	(13)
2023–2026	Barnet	112	(46)
2026–	Cambridge United	1	(0)

International career^{‡}
2024	England C	2	(1)
- * Club domestic league appearances and goals as of 08:33, 7 November 2026 (UTC) ‡ National team caps and goals as of 03:02, 17 August 2025 (UTC)

Callum Lee Stead (born 25 December 1999) is an English professional football player who plays as a forward for Cambridge United.

== Career ==
=== Early career ===
Stead began his senior career with the non-league clubs Hoddesdon Town and Langford before joining Luton Town's academy in 2017. He returned to non-league with Biggleswade Town in 2019, followed by stints at Welwyn Garden City, and Hitchin Town. On 20 September 2021, he transferred to South Shields in the Northern Premier League. After only four appearances, he returned to Hitchin before signing for Kettering Town in February 2022. On 9 July 2022, he joined Brackley Town also in the National League.

=== Barnet ===
Stead signed for Barnet in the summer of 2023. He helped Barnet win the 2024–25 National League and earned promotion to the EFL League Two, and was also named to the 2024–25 National League Team of the Season. He was named Manager's and Players' Player of the Season at Barnet for the 2024–25 season. After fifty goals in 124 appearances, he left the club at the end of the 2025–26 season.

=== Cambridge United ===
In June 2026, Stead signed for Cambridge United on a two-year deal. He chose to wear the number 12.

== International career ==
On 6 March 2024, Stead was called up to the England national football C team for a set of friendlies against Wales C and Nepal. He appeared in both matches, scoring in a 2–0 win over Nepal.

== Career statistics ==
As of match played 6 November 2026

Appearances and goals by club, season and competition
Club	Season	League			FA Cup		EFL Cup		Other		Total	
Club	Season	Division	Apps	Goals	Apps	Goals	Apps	Goals	Apps	Goals	Apps	Goals
Hoddesdon Town	2015–16	SSML Premier Division	1	0	0	0	—		0	0	1	0
Langford	2016–17	SSML Division One	4	1	0	0	—		0	0	4	1
Biggleswade Town	2019–20	SFL Premier Division Central	3	0	0	0	—		0	0	3	0
Welwyn Garden City	2019–20	SFL Division One Central	24	7	0	0	—		6 (Note: Three appearances and two goals in Southern League Cup, one appearance and one goal in FA Trophy, one appearance and one goal in Herts Senior Cup, one appearance in Herts Senior Centenary Trophy)	4	30	11
Hitchin Town	2020–21	SFL Premier Division Central	7	3	2	2	—		3 (Note: Appearances in FA Trophy)	1	12	6
Hitchin Town	2021–22	SFL Premier Division Central	6	4	2	1	—		0	0	8	5
Hitchin Town	Total		13	7	4	3	0	0	3	1	20	11
South Shields	2021–22	NPL Premier Division	4	1	0	0	—		0	0	4	1
Hitchin Town	2021–22	SFL Premier Division Central	15	8	0	0	—		3 (Note: Two appearances and one goal in Herts Senior Cup, one appearance in FA Trophy)	1	18	9
Kettering Town	2021–22	National League North	19	6	0	0	—		0	0	19	6
Brackley Town	2022–23	National League North	46	13	1	0	—		4 (Note: One appearance in FA Trophy, three appearances in National League North playoffs)	0	51	13
Barnet	2023–24	National League	34	15	4	0	—		4 (Note: Three appearances in FA Trophy, one appearance in National League playoffs)	0	42	15
Barnet	2024–25	National League	44	18	1	2	—		0	0	45	20
Barnet	2025–26	League Two	34	13	1	1	0	0	2 (Note: Appearances in EFL Trophy)	1	37	15
Barnet	Total		112	46	6	3	0	0	6	1	124	50
Cambridge United	2026–27	League One	1	0	1	0	0	0	1	2	3	2
Career Total			242	89	12	6	0	0	23	9	277	104

== Honours ==
Barnet

- National League: 2024–25

Individual

- National League Team of the Year: 2024–25
- EFL League Two Player of the Month: April 2026
