= Ryan Glover =

English footballer (born 2000)

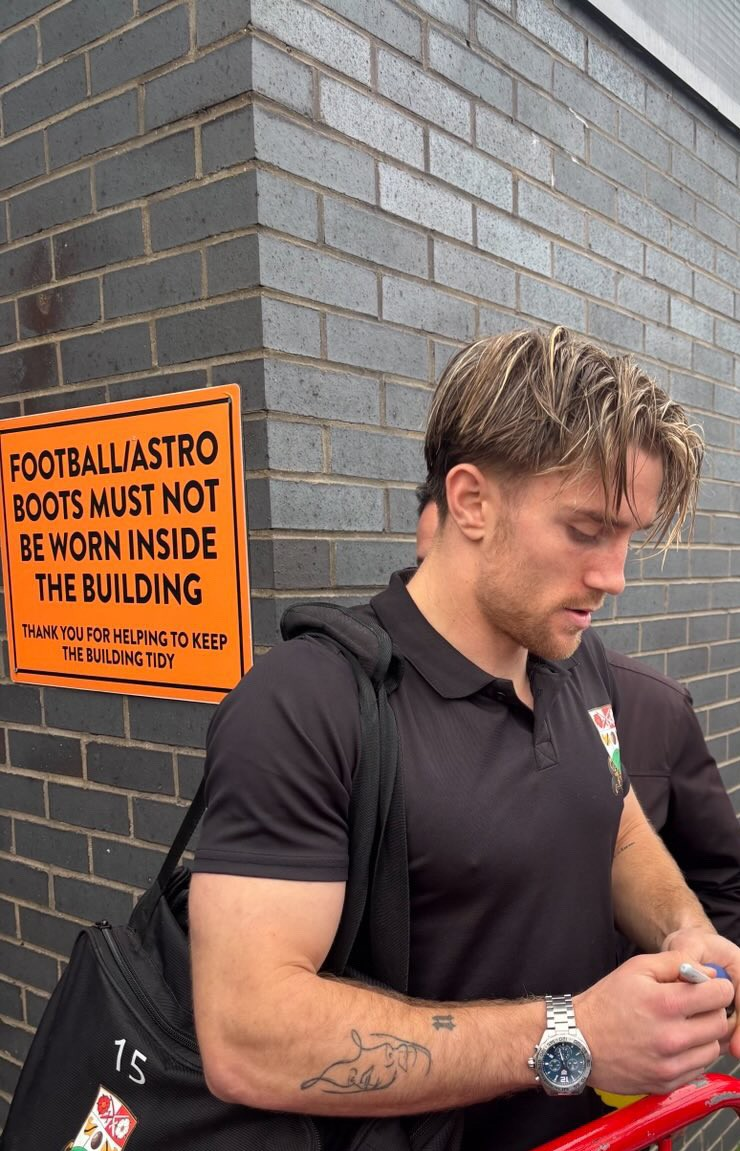
- Glover in 2025

Personal information
- Full name: Ryan Michael Scott Glover
- Date of birth: 9 November 2000 (age 26)
- Place of birth: Yeovil, England
- Height: 5 ft 10 in (1.77 m)
- Position: Midfielder

Team information
- Current team: Stockport County
- Number: 15

Youth career
- 2012–2018: AFC Bournemouth

Senior career*
Years	Team	Apps	(Gls)
2018–2022	AFC Bournemouth	0	(0)
2018	→ Weymouth (loan)	1	(0)
2020	→ Hemel Hempstead Town (loan)	2	(0)
2021–2022	→ Aldershot Town (loan)	27	(3)
2022–2024	Aldershot Town	89	(8)
2024–2026	Barnet	88	(10)
2026–	Stockport County	1	(1)
- * Club domestic league appearances and goals as of 19:46, 15 August 2026 (UTC)

Ryan Michael Scott Glover (born 9 November 2000) is an English professional footballer who plays as a midfielder for Stockport County.

== Career ==
=== AFC Bournemouth ===
Born in Yeovil, Glover joined AFC Bournemouth at the age of 11 and had his first taste of senior football whilst on loan at Weymouth in November 2018. During this short-term spell, despite featuring four times and scoring once, his time with The Terras was marred by injury. Following multiple the scans, the winger later then required ACL reconstruction due to a complication with tendons in his knee not successfully fusing together during his youth years.

Prior to making his first-team debut for Bournemouth during the 2021–22 campaign, Glover briefly spent time on loan with Hemel Hempstead Town in October 2020, during a COVID-19 disrupted season, featuring just twice.

On 24 August 2021, during an EFL Cup second round tie against Norwich City, he made his long-awaited debut for the club, replacing Emiliano Marcondes and featuring for 26 minutes in the 6–0 defeat. Later that campaign in October, Glover joined National League side, Aldershot Town on loan until January 2022, with this subsequently being extended until the end of the season. He went onto feature 29 times for the Shots, scoring three times.

=== Aldershot Town ===
On 5 August 2022, following his release from Bournemouth, Glover made his return to Aldershot Town, signing a two-year deal upon arrival. He made his return to a Shots shirt, featuring for the full 90 minutes during their opening day 4–1 defeat to Solihull Moors. Glover went onto score 5 times in 45 league appearances this campaign, with notable goals coming against FC Halifax Town and local rivals, Dorking Wanderers. Glover scored 10 goals in 101 appearances for Shots before turning down a new deal at the end of the 2023-24 season.

=== Barnet ===
Glover signed for Barnet in August 2024. Having helped the club to promotion as champions in his first season, he was named Player of the Season, an award which he received again after his second season with the club. Glover scored twelve goals in 94 games for the Bees.

=== Stockport County ===
In June 2026, Glover signed for Stockport County on a three-year deal for an undisclosed fee.

== Career statistics ==
As of end of 2025-26 season

Appearances and goals by club, season and competition
Club	Season	League			FA Cup		EFL Cup		Other		Total	
Club	Season	Division	Apps	Goals	Apps	Goals	Apps	Goals	Apps	Goals	Apps	Goals
AFC Bournemouth	2018–19	Premier League	0	0	0	0	0	0	—		0	0
AFC Bournemouth	2019–20	Premier League	0	0	0	0	0	0	—		0	0
AFC Bournemouth	2020–21	Championship	0	0	—		0	0	0	0	0	0
AFC Bournemouth	2021–22	Championship	0	0	0	0	1	0	—		1	0
AFC Bournemouth	Total		0	0	0	0	1	0	0	0	1	0
Weymouth (loan)	2018–19	Southern League Premier Division South	1	0	—		—		3 (Note: Appearances in the FA Trophy)	1	4	1
Hemel Hempstead Town (loan)	2020–21	National League South	2	0	1	0	—		0	0	3	0
Aldershot Town (loan)	2021–22	National League	27	3	—		—		2	0	29	3
Aldershot Town	2022–23	National League	45	5	1	0	—		4	2	50	7
Aldershot Town	2023–24	National League	44	3	5	0	—		2	0	51	3
Aldershot Town	Total		89	8	6	0	—		6	2	101	10
Barnet	2024–25	National League	42	6	2	2	—		0	0	44	8
Barnet	2025–26	League Two	46	4	1	0	1	0	2 (Note: Appearances in EFL Trophy)	0	50	4
Barnet	Total		88	10	3	2	1	0	2	0	94	12
Career total			207	21	10	2	2	0	13	3	232	26

== Honours ==
Barnet

- National League: 2024–25

Individual

- Barnet Player of the Season: 2024–25
