= 2026–27 York City F.C. season =

York City F.C.
2026–27 season
- Chairman: Julie-Anne & Matt Uggla
- Head coach: Scott Lindsey
- Stadium: LNER Community Stadium
- League Two: N/A
- FA Cup: Second round
- EFL Cup: Preliminary round
- EFL Trophy: Group stage
Home colours

The 2026–27 York City F.C. season is York City's 105th season in existence, and the club's first season back in League Two after relegation from the league in the 2015–16 season. The 2025–26 season saw York City promoted from the National League with a club-record breaking 108 points, scoring a club-record 114 goals in the process.

The club will be competing in League Two, the FA Cup, the EFL Cup, and the EFL Trophy.

== Managerial changes ==
Prior to the season starting, Stuart Maynard was dismissed as manager due to a difference in direction and vision for the football club. A day later, the club appointed Scott Lindsey as head coach.

== Transfers and contracts ==
=== In ===
| Date | Pos. | Player | From | Fee | Ref. |
|---|---|---|---|---|---|
| 15 June 2026 | CF | (England) Dipo Akinyemi | (Republic of Ireland) Derry City | Undisclosed | |
| 26 June 2026 | CB | (England) Zak Johnson | (England) Sunderland | Undisclosed | |
| 1 July 2026 (Note: The transfer was announced on 11 June, and would become official on July 1 once Maguire's contract at Boston United expired.) | CM | (England) Frankie Maguire | (England) Boston United | Free | |
| 1 July 2026 (Note: The transfer was announced on 26 June, and would become official on July 1 once McArthur's contract at Newcastle United expired.) | CB | (Scotland) Charlie McArthur | (England) Newcastle United | Free | |
| 1 July 2026 (Note: The transfer was announced on 26 June, and would become official on July 1 once Medley's contract at Fleetwood Town expired.) | CB | (England) Zech Medley | (England) Fleetwood Town | Free | |
| 1 July 2026 (Note: The transfer was announced on 26 June, and would become official on July 1 once Read's contract at Colchester United expired.) | CM | (England) Arthur Read | (England) Colchester United | Free | |
| 1 July 2026 (Note: The transfer was announced on 7 May, and would become official on July 1 once Shelton's contract at Barnet expired.) | CM | (England) Mark Shelton | (England) Barnet | Free | |
| 17 July 2026 | RB | (England) Jack Hunt | (England) Wigan Athletic | Free | |
| 3 August 2026 | LB | (England) Harry Boyes | (England) Southend United | Undisclosed | |

=== Loaned in ===
| Date | Pos. | Player | From | Loaned until | Ref. |
|---|---|---|---|---|---|
| 20 July 2026 | GK | (England) Alfie McNally | (England) Fulham | End of Season | |
| 26 August 2026 | CF | (England) Jovan Malcolm | (England) Stevenage | 2 January 2027 | |

=== Loaned out ===
| Date | Pos. | Player | To | Loaned until | Ref. |
|---|---|---|---|---|---|
| 1 September 2026 | CM | (England) Mark Shelton | (England) Grimsby Town | End of Season | |
| 11 September 2026 | LB | (England) Ben Brookes | (England) Sutton United | 8 December 2026 | |
| 20 October 2026 | CB | (England) Ash Palmer | (England) Southend United | 14 January 2027 | |
| 27 October 2026 | CB | (Scotland) Charlie McArthur | (England) Woking | 26 November 2026 | |

=== Out ===
| Date | Pos. | Player | To | Fee | Ref. |
|---|---|---|---|---|---|
| 18 June 2026 | CB | (England) Malachi Fagan-Walcott | (Scotland) Heart of Midlothian | £750,000 | |
| 18 August 2026 | CAM | (England) Greg Olley | (England) AFC Fylde | Undisclosed | |

=== Released / out of contract ===
| Date | Pos. | Player | Subsequent club | Joined date | Ref. |
|---|---|---|---|---|---|
| 30 June 2026 | CB | (England) Tyler Cordner | (England) AFC Totton | 1 July 2026 | |
| 30 June 2026 | LW | (England) Leone Gravata | (England) Maidstone United | 1 July 2026 | |
| 30 June 2026 | CB | (England) Callum Howe | (England) Scunthorpe United | 1 July 2026 | |
| 30 June 2026 | LW | (The Gambia) Mo Fadera | (England) Scarborough Athletic | 1 July 2026 | |
| 30 June 2026 | RW | (England) Eddie Kettlewell | (England) Bridlington Town | 1 July 2026 | |
| 30 June 2026 | CM | (Northern Ireland) Paddy McLaughlin | (England) Darlington | 1 July 2026 | |
| 30 June 2026 | LW | (Antigua and Barbuda) Ashley Nathaniel-George | (England) Worthing | 1 July 2026 | |
| 30 June 2026 | CB | (Republic of Ireland) Darragh O'Connor | (Scotland) East Kilbride | 1 July 2026 | |
| 30 June 2026 | RW | (England) Tyrese Sinclair | (Scotland) Livingston | 1 July 2026 | |
| 30 June 2026 | GK | (England) Rory Watson | (England) Harrogate Town | 1 July 2026 | |
| 30 June 2026 | CM | (England) Ricky Aguiar | (England) Worthing | 21 July 2026 | |
| 30 June 2026 | LB | (England) Cameron John | (England) Hartlepool United | 24 July 2026 | |
| 30 June 2026 | GK | (England) Harrison Male | (England) Tranmere Rovers | 28 July 2026 | |
| 30 June 2026 | CM | (England) Dan Batty | | | |

=== New Contract ===
| Date | Pos. | Player | Contract expiry | Ref. |
|---|---|---|---|---|
| 10 May 2026 | RB | (England) Ryan Fallowfield | Undisclosed | |
| 11 May 2026 | CAM | (England) Greg Olley | 30 June 2027 | |
| 20 June 2026 | GK | (England) George Sykes-Kenworthy | Undisclosed | |
| 25 June 2026 | CF | (England) Josh Stones | 30 June 2031 | |
| 1 July 2026 (Note: The contracts were announced on 26 June, and would officially commence on July 1.) | CF | (England) Ben Farrar | Undisclosed (Note: First professional contract) | |
| 1 July 2026 | MF | (Canada) Ethan Stiver | Undisclosed | |

== Pre-season and friendlies ==
On 8 June, York announced four pre-season friendlies; against Barnsley, Pickering Town, Sunderland and Peterborough United.

Win Draw Loss Fixtures

| 11 July 2026 Friendly | York City | 2–1 | Barnsley | Huntington |
| 15:00 BST | Olley 20'; Pearce 80' | Report | McGeehan 37' | Stadium: LNER Community Stadium; Attendance: 2,632 (872 away) |

| 14 July 2026 Friendly | Pickering Town | 4–2 | York City | Pickering |
| 19:30 BST | Coulibaly 11'; Thompson 24'; Trialist A 71'; Dawes 85' | Report | Hewson 36', 58' | Stadium: Mill Lane; Attendance: 928 |

| 18 July 2026 Friendly | York City | 1–5 | Sunderland | Huntington |
| 15:00 BST | Olley 55' | Report | Le Fée 7', 45'; Rigg 37'; Tutierov 44'; Proctor 56' | Stadium: LNER Community Stadium; Attendance: 7,891 (3,238 away) |

| 22 July 2026 Friendly | York City | 6–0 | Al-Ettifaq U21 | La Nucia, Spain |
| 19:00 CEST | Maguire 27'; Farrar 29'; Akinyemi 65'; Banks 67'; Olley 80'; Grey 87' | | | Stadium: La Nucia Training Complex; Attendance: 0 (BCD) |

| 24 July 2026 Friendly | Al-Ettifaq | 2–2 | York City | La Nucia, Spain |
| 19:00 CEST | Dembélé 42' (pen.); João Costa 50' | | Fallowfield 4'; Felix 82'; Banks (red card) 88' | Stadium: La Nucia Training Complex |

| 28 July 2026 Friendly | York City | 1–2 | Peterborough United | Huntington |
| 19:30 BST | Newby 52' | Report | Khela 25'; Dornelly 80' | Stadium: LNER Community Stadium; Attendance: 2,324 (304 away) |

== Competitions ==
=== League Two ===
==== League table ====
| Pos | Team | Pld | W | D | L | GF | GA | GD | Pts | Promotion, qualification or relegation |
|---|---|---|---|---|---|---|---|---|---|---|
| 2 | Barnet | 13 | 7 | 5 | 1 | 28 | 18 | +10 | 26 | Promotion to EFL League One |
| 3 | Grimsby Town | 15 | 6 | 5 | 4 | 28 | 19 | +9 | 23 | Promotion to EFL League One |
| 4 | York City | 15 | 6 | 5 | 4 | 25 | 21 | +4 | 23 | Qualification for League Two play-offs |
| 5 | Crewe Alexandra | 15 | 5 | 8 | 2 | 19 | 19 | 0 | 23 | Qualification for League Two play-offs |
| 6 | Walsall | 13 | 5 | 7 | 1 | 21 | 12 | +9 | 22 | Qualification for League Two play-offs |

Updated to match(es) played on 14 November 2026. Source: EFL Official Website
Rules for classification: 1) Points; 2) Goal difference; 3) Number of goals scored; 4) Head-to-head results; 5) Wins; 6) Away goals; 7) Penalty points (sec 9.5); 8) 12-point sending off offences

==== Results summary ====
| Overall | | | | | | | | Home | | | | | | Away | | | | | |
| Pld | W | D | L | GF | GA | GD | Pts | W | D | L | GF | GA | GD | W | D | L | GF | GA | GD |
|---|---|---|---|---|---|---|---|---|---|---|---|---|---|---|---|---|---|---|---|
| 15 | 6 | 5 | 4 | 25 | 21 | +4 | 23 | 5 | 2 | 0 | 16 | 5 | +11 | 1 | 3 | 4 | 9 | 16 | −7 |

Last updated: 14 November 2026.
Source: Soccerway

==== Results by round ====
| Round | 1 | 2 | 3 | 4 | 5 | 6 | 7 | 8 | 10 | 11 | 12 | 13 | 9^{1} | 14 | 15 | 16 | 17 | 18 | 19 | 20 | 21 | 22 | 23 | 24 | 25 | 26 | 27 | 28 |
|---|---|---|---|---|---|---|---|---|---|---|---|---|---|---|---|---|---|---|---|---|---|---|---|---|---|---|---|---|
| Ground | H | A | H | A | A | H | A | H | H | A | H | H | A | A | A | H | A | H | A | H | A | H | H | A | H | A | A | H |
| Result | W | D | W | L | D | W | L | W | D | D | D | W | L | L | W | | | | | | | | | | | | | |
| Position | 6 | 6 | 3 | 7 | 9 | 3 | 7 | 4 | 5 | 4 | 6 | 5 | 5 | 7 | 4 | | | | | | | | | | | | | |
| Points | 3 | 4 | 7 | 7 | 8 | 11 | 11 | 14 | 15 | 16 | 17 | 20 | 20 | 20 | 23 | | | | | | | | | | | | | |

Source: EFL
A = Away; H = Home; W = Win; D = Draw; L = Loss; P = Postponed
Notes:
- ^{1} Matchday 9 (vs. Barnet) was postponed due to international call-ups.

==== Matches ====
On 25 June, the League Two fixtures were revealed.

Win Draw Loss Fixtures

| 15 August 2026 1 | York City | 3–2 | Bristol Rovers | Huntington |
| 15:00 BST | Newby 60'; Boyes 63', 80'; Banks (yellow card) 70'; Williams (yellow card) 78' | Report | Mola 30'; Leigh 78' (pen.) | Stadium: LNER Community Stadium; Attendance: 8,156 (876 away); Referee: Tom Nield |

| 22 August 2026 2 | Rotherham United | 1–1 | York City | Rotherham |
| 15:00 BST | Otoo 20'; Buyabu (yellow card) 78'; Cover (yellow card) 90+4' | Report | Newby 40' | Stadium: AESSEAL New York Stadium; Attendance: 9,807 (2,479 away); Referee: Declan Bourne |

| 29 August 2026 3 | York City | 2–1 | Exeter City | Huntington |
| 15:00 BST | Newby 7'; Williams (yellow card) 41'; Fallowfield (yellow card) 52'; Malcolm 76' | Report | Cole (yellow card) 33'; Edwards (yellow card) 35'; Cummins (yellow card) 62'; Fitzwater 90+1' | Stadium: LNER Community Stadium; Attendance: 7,978 (671 away fans); Referee: Oliver Langford |

| 1 September 2026 4 | Cheltenham Town | 3–2 | York City | Cheltenham |
| 19:45 BST | McWilliams (yellow card) 5'; McCann (penalty missed) 17', 86'; Evans 17', 65' | Report | Pearce 12'; Malcolm 73' | Stadium: EV Charger Points Stadium; Attendance: 3,928; Referee: Steven Copeland |

| 5 September 2026 5 | Crewe Alexandra | 1–1 | York City | Crewe |
| 15:00 BST | Offord 9'; Billington (yellow card) 29' | Report | Banks (yellow card) 13'; Newby 40'; Williams (yellow card) 90' | Stadium: Mornflake Stadium; Attendance: 5,989 (1,249 away); Referee: Simon Mather |

| 12 September 2026 6 | York City | 4–0 | Swindon Town | Huntington |
| 15:00 BST | Newby 16', 72'; Banks 24'; Kitching (yellow card) 69'; Pearce 82' | | Clark (red card) 67'; Butterworth (yellow card) 87' | Stadium: LNER Community Stadium; Referee: Darren Drsydale |

| 19 September 2026 7 | Chesterfield | 2–0 | York City | Whittington Moor |
| 15:00 BST | McEachran (yellow card) 23'; Bonis 57'; Markanday 90+7' | Report | Banks (yellow card) 80'; Pearce (yellow card) 90' | Stadium: SMH Group Stadium; Attendance: 8,637 (1,046 away); Referee: Benjamin Speedie |

| 26 September 2026 8 | York City | 3–0 | Gillingham | Huntington |
| 15:00 BST | Grey 2' (yellow card) 45+3'; Malcolm 75'; Pearce 79' | Report | Beckles (yellow card) 37'; McKenzie (yellow card) 45+1'; McCleary (yellow card) 50'; Albarus (yellow card) 60' (red card) 70' | Stadium: LNER Community Stadium; Attendance: 8,258 (885 away} Referee: Scott Oldham |

| 10 October 2026 10 | York City | 1–1 | Northampton Town | Huntington |
| 15:00 BST | Boyes (yellow card) 49'; Pearce 85'; Maguire (yellow card) 86' | | O'Brien-Whitmarsh 10'; Powell (yellow card) 40' | Stadium: LNER Community Stadium; Attendance: 8,645; Referee: Michael Barlow |

| 17 October 2026 11 | Newport County | 1–1 | York City | Newport |
| 15:00 BST | Dibley-Dias (yellow card) 17'; Etete 54', (yellow card) 87'; Biggins (yellow card) 79' | Report | Pearce 4', (yellow card) 47'; Malcolm (red card) 24'; Grey (yellow card) 53' | Stadium: Rodney Parade; Attendance: 5,281; Referee: Neil Hair |

| 20 October 2026 12 | York City | 1–1 | Accrington Stanley | Huntington |
| 19:45 BST | Hunt (yellow card) 55'; Read (yellow card) 81'; Pearce 90' | Report | Love (yellow card) 14'; Woods 62'; Borland (yellow card) 82'; Mols (yellow card) 87' | Stadium: LNER Community Stadium; Attendance: 7,375; Referee: Declan Brown |

| 24 October 2026 13 | York City | 2–0 | Port Vale | Huntington |
| 15:00 BST | Johnson 54'; Hunt 61' | Report | Dempsey (yellow card) 84' | Stadium: LNER Community Stadium; Attendance: 8,236; Referee: David Webb |

| 27 October 2026 9 | Barnet | 3–1 | York City | Edgware |
| 19:45 GMT | Tshimanga 39'; Maskell (yellow card) 46'; Kanu (yellow card) 49'; Reeves 80', (yellow card) 83'; McNally 87' (o.g.); Ajayi (yellow card) 87' | Report | Hunt (yellow card) 29'; Read 37'; Boateng (yellow card) 45+4' (red card) 52'; Pearce (yellow card) 62'; King (yellow card) 77'; Kitching (yellow card) 90+2' | Stadium: The Hive Stadium; Referee: Ben Toner |
Note: Fixture was initially scheduled for 3 October, but was rearranged due to international call-ups within the Barnet squad.

| 31 October 2026 14 | Grimsby Town | 5–2 | York City | Cleethorpes |
| 12:30 GMT | Cook 13'; Morgan 31'; McJannet 75'; Andrews 78'; Turi 86' | Report | A. Hunt 18'; J. Hunt 28' | Stadium: Blundell Park; Attendance: 8,111; Referee: Aaron Jackson |
Note: Fixture was initially scheduled for a 15:00 kick-off, but was brought forward for live Sky Sports broadcasting.

| 14 November 2026 15 | Rochdale | 0–1 | York City | Spotland |
| 15:00 GMT | Gilmour (yellow card) 67' | Report | Hunt (yellow card) 29'; Pearce 56'; Felix (yellow card) 60'; Banks (yellow card) 88' | Stadium: Crown Oil Arena; Attendance: 5,612 (1,644 City fans); Referee: Matthew Donohue |

| 21 November 2026 16 | York City | v | Walsall | Huntington |
| 15:00 GMT | | | | Stadium: LNER Community Stadium |

| 28 November 2026 17 | Colchester United | v | York City | Colchester |
| 15:00 GMT | | | | Stadium: JobServe Community Stadium |

| 1 December 2026 18 | York City | v | Shrewsbury Town | Huntington |
| 19:45 GMT | | | | Stadium: LNER Community Stadium |

| 12 December 2026 19 | Tranmere Rovers | v | York City | Birkenhead |
| 12:30 GMT | | | | Stadium: Prenton Park |
Note: Fixture was initially scheduled for a 15:00 kick-off, but was brought forward for live Sky Sports broadcasting.

| 19 December 2026 20 | York City | v | Crawley Town | Huntington |
| 15:00 GMT | | | | Stadium: LNER Community Stadium |

| 26 December 2026 21 | Oldham Athletic | v | York City | Oldham |
| 15:00 GMT | | | | Stadium: Boundary Park |

| 29 December 2026 22 | York City | v | Fleetwood Town | Huntington |
| 19:45 GMT | | | | Stadium: LNER Community Stadium |

| 1 January 2027 23 | York City | v | Salford City | Huntington |
| 15:00 GMT | | | | Stadium: LNER Community Stadium |

| 9 January 2027 24 | Crawley Town | v | York City | Crawley |
| 15:00 GMT | | | | Stadium: Broadfield Stadium |

| 16 January 2027 25 | York City | v | Newport County | Huntington |
| 15:00 GMT | | | | Stadium: LNER Community Stadium |

| 19 January 2027 26 | Accrington Stanley | v | York City | Accrington |
| 19:45 GMT | | | | Stadium: Wham Stadium |

| 23 January 2027 27 | Port Vale | v | York City | Burslem |
| 15:00 GMT | | | | Stadium: Vale Park |

| 30 January 2027 28 | York City | v | Grimsby Town | Huntington |
| 12:30 GMT | | | | Stadium: LNER Community Stadium |
Note: Fixture was initially scheduled for a 15:00 kick-off, but was brought forward for live Sky Sports broadcasting.

=== FA Cup ===
York were drawn at home to Northampton Town in the first round and to Carlisle United in the second round.

Win Draw Loss Fixtures

| 7 November 2026 First round | York City | 4–0 | Northampton Town | Huntington |
| 15:00 GMT | Pearce 1', 11'; Hunt 29'; Stones 81' | Report | Wormleighton (yellow card) 41' | Stadium: LNER Community Stadium; Attendance: 4,273 (413 away); Referee: Martin Coy |

| 4–7 December 2026 Second round | York City | v | Carlisle United | Huntington |
| TBA GMT | | | | Stadium: LNER Community Stadium |

=== EFL Cup ===
York were drawn at home to Crawley Town in the preliminary round.

Win Draw Loss Fixtures

| 3 August 2026 Preliminary round | York City | 0–2 | Crawley Town | Huntington |
| 19:30 BST | Brookes (yellow card) 36'; Medley (yellow card) 71'; Akinyemi (yellow card) 76'; McNally (yellow card) 86' | Report | Di Biase 24'; Arthurs (yellow card) 44'; Barker (yellow card) 49'; Russell (yellow card) 69'; Orsi 86' | Stadium: York Community Stadium; Referee: Thomas Parsons |

=== EFL Trophy ===
==== Group stage ====
York were drawn against Bradford City, Rotherham United and Newcastle United U21 in the Northern Group C.

| Pos | Div | Team | Pld | W | PW | PL | L | GF | GA | GD | Pts | Qualification |
|---|---|---|---|---|---|---|---|---|---|---|---|---|
| 1 | L1 | Bradford City | 3 | 3 | 0 | 0 | 0 | 10 | 1 | +9 | 9 | Advance to Round 2 |
| 2 | ACA | Newcastle United U21 | 3 | 2 | 0 | 0 | 1 | 5 | 3 | +2 | 6 | Advance to Round 2 |
| 3 | L2 | Rotherham United | 3 | 0 | 1 | 0 | 2 | 1 | 6 | −5 | 2 | |
| 4 | L2 | York City | 3 | 0 | 0 | 1 | 2 | 2 | 8 | −6 | 1 | |

Source: EFL

Win Draw Loss Fixtures

| 15 September 2026 Group stage | York City | 1–3 | Newcastle United U21 | Huntington |
| 19:00 BST | Felix 8' | | Salia 44'; Thompson 46'; Cá 83' | Stadium: LNER Community Stadium; Attendance: 1,835; Referee: Gareth Rhodes |

| 22 September 2026 Group stage | York City | 1–1 (4–5 p) | Rotherham United | Huntington |
| 19:00 BST | Medley 44'; Palmer (yellow card) 50' | Report | Buyabu 57' | Stadium: LNER Community Stadium; Attendance: 1,995 (354 away); Referee: Dale Baines |
| | Penalties |
| | Read (penalty scored); Akinyemi (penalty scored); Stiver (penalty scored); Malcolm (penalty missed); Farrar (penalty scored) | | Mullin (penalty scored); Fitzgerald (penalty scored); Rafferty (penalty scored); Hall (penalty scored); Buyabu (penalty scored) |

| 10 November 2026 Group stage | Bradford City | 4–0 | York City | Bradford |
| 19:30 GMT | Sarcevic 32'; Humphrys 61'; Swan 70'; Powell 86' | Report | Farrar (yellow card) 83'; King (yellow card) 84' | Stadium: Mbanq Valley Parade; Attendance: 2,524; Referee: Jamie O'Connor |

== Statistics ==
=== Appearances and goals ===
As of match played 14 November 2026

Players with no appearances are not included on the list; italics indicate a loaned in player

| No. | Pos | Nat | Player | Total | | League Two | | FA Cup | | EFL Cup | | EFL Trophy | |
| No. | Pos | Nat | Player | Apps | Goals | Apps | Goals | Apps | Goals | Apps | Goals | Apps | Goals |
|---|---|---|---|---|---|---|---|---|---|---|---|---|---|
| 1 | GK | (England) ENG | Alfie McNally | 17 | 0 | 15+0 | 0 | 1+0 | 0 | 1+0 | 0 | 0+0 | 0 |
| 2 | DF | (England) ENG | Ryan Fallowfield | 15 | 0 | 12+2 | 0 | 1+0 | 0 | 0+0 | 0 | 0+0 | 0 |
| 3 | DF | (England) ENG | Mark Kitching | 16 | 0 | 15+0 | 0 | 1+0 | 0 | 0+0 | 0 | 0+0 | 0 |
| 4 | DF | (England) ENG | Zech Medley | 11 | 1 | 0+6 | 0 | 0+1 | 0 | 1+0 | 0 | 3+0 | 1 |
| 5 | DF | (England) ENG | Zak Johnson | 14 | 1 | 12+0 | 1 | 1+0 | 0 | 1+0 | 0 | 0+0 | 0 |
| 6 | DF | (England) ENG | Ash Palmer | 3 | 0 | 0+1 | 0 | 0+0 | 0 | 0+0 | 0 | 2+0 | 0 |
| 7 | FW | (England) ENG | Joe Grey | 16 | 1 | 13+1 | 1 | 0+0 | 0 | 1+0 | 0 | 1+0 | 0 |
| 8 | MF | (England) ENG | Alex Hunt | 17 | 3 | 15+0 | 2 | 1+0 | 1 | 1+0 | 0 | 0+0 | 0 |
| 9 | FW | (England) ENG | Josh Stones | 5 | 1 | 1+3 | 0 | 0+1 | 1 | 0+0 | 0 | 0+0 | 0 |
| 10 | FW | (England) ENG | Ollie Pearce | 18 | 9 | 15+0 | 7 | 1+0 | 2 | 1+0 | 0 | 1+0 | 0 |
| 11 | MF | (England) ENG | Frankie Maguire | 12 | 0 | 1+8 | 0 | 0+1 | 0 | 0+0 | 0 | 2+0 | 0 |
| 12 | DF | (England) ENG | Harry Boyes | 16 | 2 | 15+0 | 2 | 1+0 | 0 | 0+0 | 0 | 0+0 | 0 |
| 14 | DF | (England) ENG | Ben Brookes | 1 | 0 | 0+0 | 0 | 0+0 | 0 | 1+0 | 0 | 0+0 | 0 |
| 15 | DF | (England) ENG | Jeff King | 11 | 0 | 3+7 | 0 | 0+0 | 0 | 0+0 | 0 | 1+0 | 0 |
| 16 | MF | (England) ENG | Arthur Read | 17 | 1 | 3+11 | 1 | 1+0 | 0 | 0+0 | 0 | 2+0 | 0 |
| 17 | FW | (England) ENG | Craig Hewitt | 3 | 0 | 0+3 | 0 | 0+0 | 0 | 0+0 | 0 | 0+0 | 0 |
| 18 | FW | (England) ENG | Jovan Malcolm | 14 | 3 | 1+9 | 3 | 0+1 | 0 | 0+0 | 0 | 3+0 | 0 |
| 20 | FW | (England) ENG | Dipo Akinyemi | 5 | 0 | 1+0 | 0 | 0+0 | 0 | 1+0 | 0 | 3+0 | 0 |
| 21 | MF | (England) ENG | Hiram Boateng | 5 | 0 | 2+2 | 0 | 1+0 | 0 | 0+0 | 0 | 0+0 | 0 |
| 23 | DF | (England) ENG | Joe Felix | 19 | 1 | 10+5 | 0 | 1+0 | 0 | 0+1 | 0 | 2+0 | 1 |
| 24 | DF | (England) ENG | Morgan Williams | 7 | 0 | 5+1 | 0 | 0+0 | 0 | 1+0 | 0 | 0+0 | 0 |
| 25 | FW | (England) ENG | Ben Farrar | 3 | 0 | 0+0 | 0 | 0+0 | 0 | 0+0 | 0 | 0+3 | 0 |
| 26 | MF | (England) ENG | Ethan Stiver | 3 | 0 | 0+0 | 0 | 0+0 | 0 | 0+0 | 0 | 3+0 | 0 |
| 28 | MF | (England) ENG | Ollie Banks | 16 | 1 | 14+0 | 1 | 1+0 | 0 | 1+0 | 0 | 0+0 | 0 |
| 30 | FW | (England) ENG | Alex Newby | 16 | 6 | 9+4 | 6 | 0+1 | 0 | 0+1 | 0 | 1+0 | 0 |
| 31 | GK | (England) ENG | George Sykes-Kenworthy | 3 | 0 | 0+0 | 0 | 0+0 | 0 | 0+0 | 0 | 3+0 | 0 |
| 32 | DF | (England) ENG | Jack Hunt | 10 | 1 | 3+3 | 1 | 0+0 | 0 | 1+0 | 0 | 3+0 | 0 |
| 33 | DF | (Scotland) SCO | Charlie McArthur | 3 | 0 | 0+1 | 0 | 0+0 | 0 | 0+0 | 0 | 2+0 | 0 |
| 36 | DF | (England) ENG | Lewis Beadle | 3 | 0 | 0+0 | 0 | 0+0 | 0 | 0+0 | 0 | 1+2 | 0 |
| 37 | MF | (England) ENG | Oliver Belleh | 3 | 0 | 0+0 | 0 | 0+0 | 0 | 0+0 | 0 | 0+3 | 0 |
| 38 | MF | (England) ENG | Luka Ozisik | 2 | 0 | 0+0 | 0 | 0+0 | 0 | 0+0 | 0 | 0+2 | 0 |
Player(s) who featured but departed the club permanently during the season:
| 22 | MF | (England) ENG | Greg Olley | 1 | 0 | 0 | 0 | 0 | 0 | 0+1 | 0 | 0 | 0 |

=== Disciplinary record ===
As of match played 14 November 2026

Includes all competitive matches. The list is sorted by squad number when disciplinary points / points per card / number of cards are equal. Players with no cards not included in the list.

| Rank | No. | Pos. | Nat. | Name | League Two | | | FA Cup | | | EFL Cup | | | EFL Trophy | | | Total | | |
| Rank | No. | Pos. | Nat. | Name | Yellow card | Second yellow card | Red card | Yellow card | Second yellow card | Red card | Yellow card | Second yellow card | Red card | Yellow card | Second yellow card | Red card | Yellow card | Second yellow card | Red card |
|---|---|---|---|---|---|---|---|---|---|---|---|---|---|---|---|---|---|---|---|
| 1 | 24 | CB | (England) | Morgan Williams | 4 | 0 | 0 | 0 | 0 | 0 | 0 | 0 | 0 | 0 | 0 | 0 | 4 | 0 | 0 |
| 1 | 28 | CAM | (England) | Ollie Banks | 4 | 0 | 0 | 0 | 0 | 0 | 0 | 0 | 0 | 0 | 0 | 0 | 4 | 0 | 0 |
| 3 | 10 | CF | (England) | Ollie Pearce | 3 | 0 | 0 | 0 | 0 | 0 | 0 | 0 | 0 | 0 | 0 | 0 | 3 | 0 | 0 |
| 3 | 18 | CF | (England) | Jovan Malcolm | 0 | 0 | 1 | 0 | 0 | 0 | 0 | 0 | 0 | 0 | 0 | 0 | 0 | 0 | 1 |
| 5 | 3 | CB | (England) | Mark Kitching | 2 | 0 | 0 | 0 | 0 | 0 | 0 | 0 | 0 | 0 | 0 | 0 | 2 | 0 | 0 |
| 5 | 7 | CAM | (England) | Joe Grey | 2 | 0 | 0 | 0 | 0 | 0 | 0 | 0 | 0 | 0 | 0 | 0 | 2 | 0 | 0 |
| 5 | 8 | CM | (Republic of Ireland) | Alex Hunt | 2 | 0 | 0 | 0 | 0 | 0 | 0 | 0 | 0 | 0 | 0 | 0 | 2 | 0 | 0 |
| 5 | 15 | RWB | (England) | Jeff King | 1 | 0 | 0 | 0 | 0 | 0 | 0 | 0 | 0 | 1 | 0 | 0 | 2 | 0 | 0 |
| 5 | 21 | CM | (England) | Hiram Boateng | 0 | 1 | 0 | 0 | 0 | 0 | 0 | 0 | 0 | 0 | 0 | 0 | 0 | 1 | 0 |
| 10 | 1 | GK | (England) | Alfie McNally | 0 | 0 | 0 | 0 | 0 | 0 | 1 | 0 | 0 | 0 | 0 | 0 | 1 | 0 | 0 |
| 10 | 2 | RB | (England) | Ryan Fallowfield | 1 | 0 | 0 | 0 | 0 | 0 | 0 | 0 | 0 | 0 | 0 | 0 | 1 | 0 | 0 |
| 10 | 4 | CB | (England) | Zech Medley | 0 | 0 | 0 | 0 | 0 | 0 | 1 | 0 | 0 | 0 | 0 | 0 | 1 | 0 | 0 |
| 10 | 6 | CB | (England) | Ash Palmer | 0 | 0 | 0 | 0 | 0 | 0 | 0 | 0 | 0 | 1 | 0 | 0 | 1 | 0 | 0 |
| 10 | 11 | CAM | (England) | Frankie Maguire | 1 | 0 | 0 | 0 | 0 | 0 | 0 | 0 | 0 | 0 | 0 | 0 | 1 | 0 | 0 |
| 10 | 12 | LWB | (England) | Harry Boyes | 1 | 0 | 0 | 0 | 0 | 0 | 0 | 0 | 0 | 0 | 0 | 0 | 1 | 0 | 0 |
| 10 | 14 | LB | (England) | Ben Brookes | 0 | 0 | 0 | 0 | 0 | 0 | 1 | 0 | 0 | 0 | 0 | 0 | 1 | 0 | 0 |
| 10 | 16 | CDM | (England) | Arthur Read | 1 | 0 | 0 | 0 | 0 | 0 | 0 | 0 | 0 | 0 | 0 | 0 | 1 | 0 | 0 |
| 10 | 20 | CF | (England) | Dipo Akinyemi | 0 | 0 | 0 | 0 | 0 | 0 | 1 | 0 | 0 | 0 | 0 | 0 | 1 | 0 | 0 |
| 10 | 23 | RB | (England) | Joe Felix | 1 | 0 | 0 | 0 | 0 | 0 | 0 | 0 | 0 | 0 | 0 | 0 | 1 | 0 | 0 |
| 10 | 25 | CF | (England) | Ben Farrar | 0 | 0 | 0 | 0 | 0 | 0 | 0 | 0 | 0 | 1 | 0 | 0 | 1 | 0 | 0 |
| 10 | 32 | RB | (England) | Jack Hunt | 1 | 0 | 0 | 0 | 0 | 0 | 0 | 0 | 0 | 0 | 0 | 0 | 1 | 0 | 0 |
| Total | | | | | 24 | 1 | 1 | 0 | 0 | 0 | 4 | 0 | 0 | 3 | 0 | 0 | 31 | 1 | 1 |

== Awards ==
=== Player awards ===
==== EFL League Two Player of the Month ====
| Month | Player | Result | Ref. |
|---|---|---|---|
| August | (England) Harry Boyes | Won | |

==== EFL League Two Goal of the Month ====
| Month | Player | Opposition | Result | Ref. |
|---|---|---|---|---|
| September | (England) Alex Newby | v. Swindon Town | Nominated | |

=== Manager awards ===
==== EFL League Two Manager of the Month ====
| Month | Manager | Result | Ref. |
|---|---|---|---|
| August | (England) Scott Lindsey | Nominated | |
