= Joe Felix =

English footballer (born 1999)

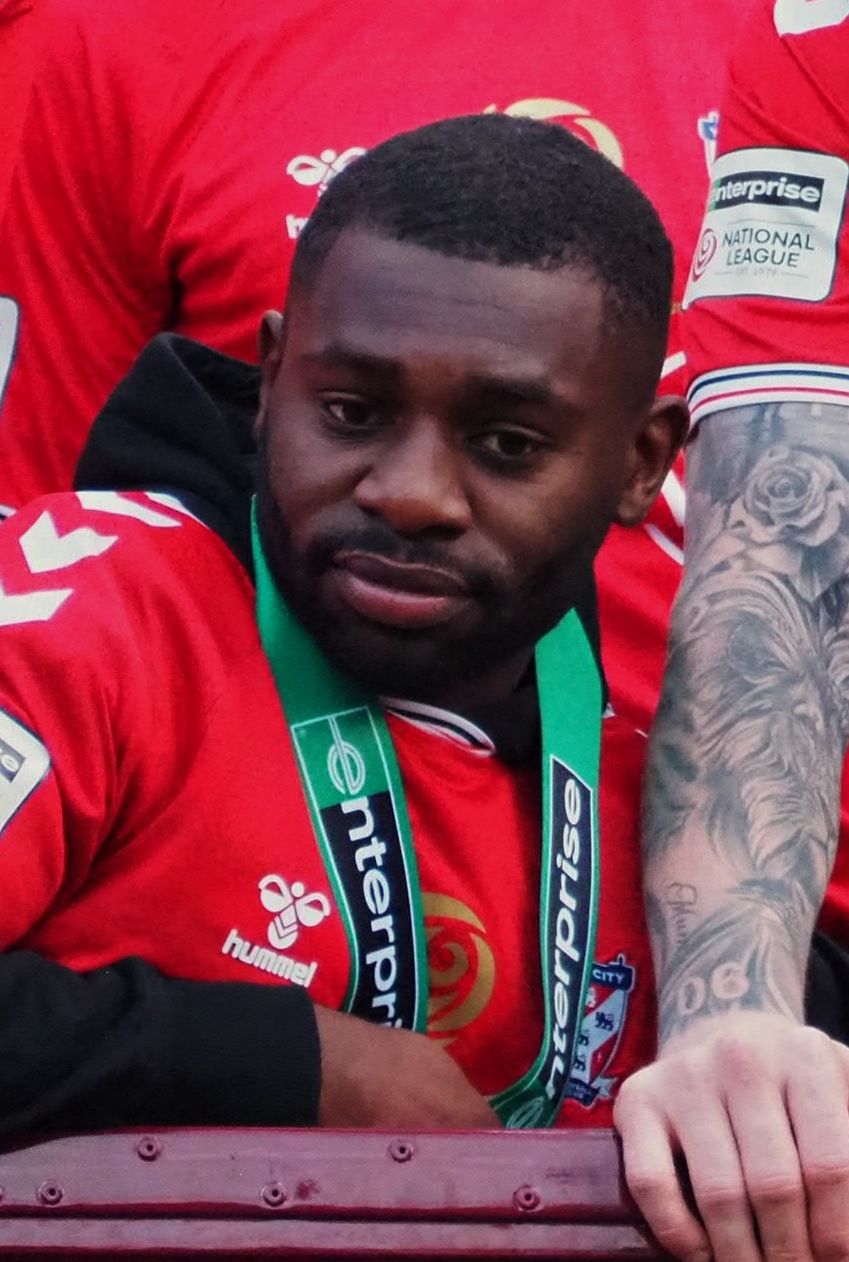
- Felix in 2026

Personal information
- Full name: Joseph Rabole Felix
- Date of birth: 29 September 1999 (age 27)
- Place of birth: London, England
- Height: 5 ft 4 in (1.63 m)
- Position: Right-back

Team information
- Current team: York City
- Number: 23

Youth career
- Wandsworth Town
- –2018: Fulham

Senior career*
Years	Team	Apps	(Gls)
2018–2019	Queens Park Rangers	0	(0)
2018–2019	→ Hartley Wintney (loan)	6	(1)
2019	→ Burgess Hill Town (loan)		
2019	Woking	0	(0)
2019	Farnborough	5	(0)
2019–2020	Hampton & Richmond Borough	0	(0)
2019–2020	→ Hendon (dual registration)	9	(1)
2020	Walton Casuals	1	(0)
2020–2021	Billericay Town	30	(1)
2021–2022	Torquay United	10	(0)
2022–2023	Dulwich Hamlet	43	(3)
2023–2024	Worthing	44	(3)
2024–	York City	86	(3)
- * Club domestic league appearances and goals as of 16:40, 15 November 2026 (UTC)

Joseph Rabole Felix (born 29 September 1999) is an English professional footballer who plays as a right-back for EFL League Two club York City.

== Early life and career ==
=== Early life and early career ===
Joseph Rabole Felix was born on 29 September 1999 in London. He started his career as a youth player with Wandsworth Town before becoming a scholar with Fulham aged 16. After being released by Fulham, he signed for Championship club Queens Park Rangers on 1 July 2018 on a one-year contract following a successful trial, and became part of the club's under-23 squad. He joined Southern League Premier Division South club Hartley Wintney on 11 December on a one-month loan, and made six league appearances, scoring one goal. This goal came on 22 December in a 4–3 home win over Poole Town, with a low shot into the corner of the goal to open the scoring in the match. He joined Isthmian League Premier Division club Burgess Hill Town on 29 March 2019 on loan until the end of the 2018–19 season. He was released by QPR at the end of the season.

Felix signed for National League club Woking on 12 August 2019 on non-contract terms after playing on trial during pre-season, before joining Farnborough of the Southern League Premier Division South later that month without having made an appearance for Woking. He made his debut for Farnborough on 17 August, playing the entirety of the club's 3–1 away win over Beaconsfield Town in a league match. He made eight appearances in all competitions for Farnborough before joining National League South club Hampton & Richmond Borough in October. His only appearance for the club came on 12 November in a 2–2 draw at home to Harrow Borough in the Middlesex Senior Cup. He joined Southern League Premier Division South club Hendon on dual registration terms later in November, making his debut on 23 November as a 69th-minute substitute in a 2–1 away win over Tiverton Town in a league match. His only goal for Hendon came on 4 January 2020 in the 64th minute of a 4–0 home win in the league over Weston-super-Mare. He signed for Hendon's divisional rivals Walton Casuals in March, and made one appearance for the club, in a 1–1 draw at home to Hendon on 7 March. This was the last match played by the club in 2019–20 season, which was abandoned in March because of the COVID-19 pandemic in England.

Felix signed for National League South club Billericay Town on 10 September 2020, making his debut on 3 October in the club's first match of the 2020–21 season, a 2–2 draw away to Brackley Town in the FA Cup second qualifying round, which Billericay lost 4–2 in a penalty shoot-out. He had made 17 appearances for Billericay in all competitions before the National League South season was brought to an end in February 2021 and results declared null and void. Felix scored his only goal for Billericay on 26 October to open the scoring in the 15th minute of a league fixture away St Albans City, although his team went on to lose 4–1. Felix signed for National League club Torquay United on 10 December 2021, having made 18 appearances in all competitions and scored once for Billericay by that point in the 2021–22 season. He made his Torquay debut on 2 January 2022 when starting the team's 2–1 away win over Yeovil Town in the league, in which he was substituted in the 67th minute. He made 10 appearances for Torquay, all of which came in league competition, before being released at the end of the season.

=== Dulwich Hamlet, Worthing and York City ===
Felix signed for Dulwich Hamlet of the National League South on 5 August 2022, having played for the club on trial throughout pre-season. His debut came the following day in the team's first match of the season, a 2–1 home win over Braintree Town in a league match. Felix scored his first goal for the club on 26 December with the opening goal of a 1–1 draw at home to Dover Athletic, which he scored in the 19th minute. He made 49 appearances in all competitions, scoring three goals, for Dulwich Hamlet in the 2022–23 season. While the club was relegated at the end of the season, Felix was named the club's Supporters' Player of the Year and Players' Player of the Year, and also won the Goal of the Season award. He signed for National League South club Worthing on 9 June 2023, with manager Adam Hinshelwood commenting that "He's only 23 but has lots of experience already and is comfortable in a number of positions". Felix made his debut on 5 August in Worthing's opening day 1–0 home win over Tonbridge Angels in the league. He scored his first goal for the club on 7 October in the 54th minute of a 2–2 draw at home to Truro City in the league. Felix made 51 appearances in all competitions, scoring three goals, for Worthing in the 2023–24 season. He was a popular player with supporters due to his work-rate, and was recognised by his teammates by being named the club's Players' Player of the Season. He was also named in the 2023–24 National League South Team of the Season.

A day after turning down a new contract with Worthing, Felix signed for National League club York City on 25 May 2024, reuniting with his former Worthing manager Hinshelwood. Felix made his debut on 10 August in York's first match of the 2024–25 season, a 1–1 draw away to Southend United in the league, and quickly established himself as a popular player with supporters. He scored his first goal for York on 2 November in the 90th minute of a 3–2 defeat away to Wycombe Wanderers in the FA Cup first round, with a left-footed shot low into the bottom-left corner of the goal. Before the end of the season, Felix was voted by supporters as York's Clubman of the Year. He helped the team to a second-place finish in the 2024–25 National League, and played in the play-off semi-final 3–0 defeat at home to Oldham Athletic on 20 May 2025. Felix played in all of York's 51 matches in all competitions in the 2024–25 season, scoring three goals. He signed a new long-term contract, of undisclosed length, with York in September, having established himself as an important player since arriving at the club. A toe injury saw him lose his place in the team, with manager Stuart Maynard opting to play Jeff King at right wing-back in the closing stages of the 2025–26 season. York went on to win the 2025–26 National League title on the last day of the season with a 1–1 draw away to title rivals Rochdale, finishing the season with 108 points and seeing the club promoted to League Two after a ten-year absence from the Football League. Felix made 27 appearances and scored one goal in all competitions for York in the 2025–26 season.

Felix made his Football League debut on 15 August 2026 in York's 3–2 home win over Bristol Rovers in their first match of the 2026–27 League Two season, and drew praise from head coach Scott Lindsey for his performance, saying that "He will give you absolutely everything, he'll die out on the pitch for you and I thought he was class today."

== Career statistics ==
As of match played 14 November 2026

Appearances and goals by club, season and competition
Club	Season	League			FA Cup		EFL Cup		Other		Total	
Club	Season	Division	Apps	Goals	Apps	Goals	Apps	Goals	Apps	Goals	Apps	Goals
Queens Park Rangers	2018–19	Championship	0	0	0	0	0	0	—		0	0
Hartley Wintney (loan)	2018–19	Southern League Premier Division South	6	1	—		—				6	1
Woking	2019–20	National League	0	0	—		—		—		0	0
Farnborough	2019–20	Southern League Premier Division South	5	0	2	0	—		1 (Note: Appearance in Hampshire Senior Cup)	0	8	0
Hampton & Richmond Borough	2019–20	National League South	0	0	—		—		1 (Note: Appearance in Middlesex Senior Cup)	0	1	0
Hendon (dual registration)	2019–20	Southern League Premier Division South	9	1	—		—		2 (Note: Appearances in Southern League Cup)	0	11	1
Walton Casuals	2019–20	Southern League Premier Division South	1	0	—		—		—		1	0
Billericay Town	2020–21	National League South	15	0	1	0	—		1 (Note: Appearance in FA Trophy)	0	17	0
Billericay Town	2021–22	National League South	15	1	2	0	—		1	0	18	1
Billericay Town	Total		30	1	3	0	—		2	0	35	1
Torquay United	2021–22	National League	10	0	—		—		—		10	0
Dulwich Hamlet	2022–23	National League South	43	3	2	0	—		4 (Note: Three appearances in London Senior Cup, one appearance in FA Trophy)	0	49	3
Worthing	2023–24	National League South	44	3	3	0	—		4 (Note: One appearance in FA Trophy, one appearance in Sussex Senior Cup, two appearances in National League South play-offs)	0	51	3
York City	2024–25	National League	46	2	2	1	—		3 (Note: Two appearances in FA Trophy, one appearance in National League play-offs)	0	51	3
York City	2025–26	National League	25	1	2	0	—		0	0	27	1
York City	2026–27	League Two	15	0	1	0	1	0	2 (Note: Appearances in EFL Trophy)	1	19	1
York City	Total		86	3	5	1	1	0	5	1	97	5
Career total			234	12	15	1	1	0	19	1	269	14

== Honours ==
York City

- National League: 2025–26

Individual

- Dulwich Hamlet Supporters' Player of the Year: 2022–23
- Dulwich Hamlet Players' Player of the Year: 2022–23
- Dulwich Hamlet Goal of the Season: 2022–23
- Worthing Players' Player of the Season: 2023–24
- National League South Team of the Season: 2023–24
- York City Clubman of the Year: 2024–25
