= Harry Boyes (footballer) =

English footballer (born 2001)

Personal information
- Full name: Harry Boyes
- Date of birth: 2 November 2001 (age 25)
- Place of birth: Barnsley, England
- Position: Left wing back

Team information
- Current team: York City
- Number: 12

Youth career
- Manchester City
- 2018–2020: Sheffield United

Senior career*
Years	Team	Apps	(Gls)
2020–2025	Sheffield United	0	(0)
2020–2021	→ Bradford (Park Avenue) (loan)	13	(2)
2021–2022	→ Solihull Moors (loan)	31	(5)
2022–2023	→ Forest Green Rovers (loan)	12	(0)
2023	→ Lincoln City (loan)	18	(0)
2023–2024	→ Wycombe Wanderers (loan)	22	(0)
2024	→ Fleetwood Town (loan)	5	(0)
2025–2026	Southend United	44	(1)
2026–	York City	16	(2)
- * Club domestic league appearances and goals as of 14:30, 22 November 2026 (UTC)

Harry Boyes (born 2 November 2001) is an English professional footballer who plays as a left wingback for EFL League Two club York City.

== Career ==
=== Sheffield United ===
Born in Barnsley, Boyes began his career with Manchester City and Sheffield United. He spent time on loan in non-league with Bradford (Park Avenue), and Solihull Moors, where he was in the National League team of the season.

He moved on loan to Forest Green Rovers in June 2022. Boyes spent the early part of the season injured. He was recalled by parent club Sheffield United on 2 January 2023 having played 16 times providing 3 assists in all competitions, and four days later he joined League One rival Lincoln City on loan for the remainder of the season. He made his debut a day later against Charlton Athletic on a 2–1 defeat. Boyes played a further 17 games for Lincoln before returning to his parent club at the conclusion of the season.

On 13 July 2023, Boyes joined League One side Wycombe Wanderers on a season-long loan. On 12 January 2024, his loan at Wycombe was cancelled and he was loaned to Fleetwood Town.

On 29 May 2025, Sheffield United announced that Boyes would be departing the club upon the expiration of his contract.

On 2 July 2025, Boyes signed for National League side Southend United, penning a two-year deal.

In August 2026 he signed for York City.

== Career statistics ==
As of match played 21 November 2026

Appearances and goals by club, season and competition
Club	Season	League			FA Cup		League Cup		Other		Total	
Club	Season	Division	Apps	Goals	Apps	Goals	Apps	Goals	Apps	Goals	Apps	Goals
Sheffield United	2020–21	Premier League	0	0	0	0	0	0	—		0	0
Sheffield United	2021–22	Championship	0	0	0	0	0	0	—		0	0
Sheffield United	2022–23	Championship	0	0	0	0	0	0	—		0	0
Sheffield United	2023–24	Premier League	0	0	0	0	0	0	—		0	0
Sheffield United	2024–25	Championship	0	0	0	0	1	0	—		1	0
Sheffield United	Total		0	0	0	0	1	0	0	0	1	0
Bradford Park Avenue (loan)	2020–21	National League North	13	2	0	0	—		0	0	13	2
Solihull Moors (loan)	2021–22	National League	31	5	2	0	0	0	3	0	36	5
Forest Green Rovers (loan)	2022–23	League One	12	0	2	0	0	0	2	0	16	0
Lincoln City (loan)	2022–23	League One	18	0	0	0	0	0	0	0	18	0
Wycombe Wanderers (loan)	2023–24	League One	22	0	1	0	2	0	4	0	29	0
Fleetwood Town (loan)	2023–24	League One	5	0	0	0	0	0	0	0	5	0
Southend United	2025–26	National League	44	1	0	0	0	0	2 (Note: One appearance in the FA Trophy, one appearance in the play-offs)	0	46	1
York City	2026–27	League Two	16	2	1	0	0	0	0	0	17	2
Career total			161	10	6	0	3	0	11	0	181	10

== Honours ==
Southend United

- FA Trophy: 2025–26

Individual

- National League Team of the Season: 2021–22
- EFL League Two Player of the Month: August 2026

== Playing style ==
Boyes is a left wingback.
