= Morgan Williams (footballer, born 1999) =

English footballer (born 1999)

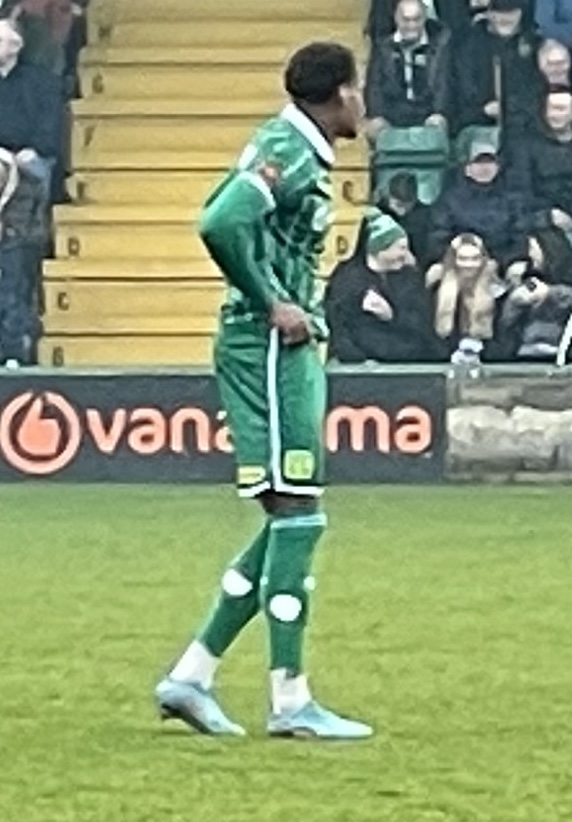
- Williams in 2024

Personal information
- Full name: Morgan Gerald Williams
- Date of birth: 30 August 1999 (age 27)
- Place of birth: Derby, England
- Height: 6 ft 2 in (1.88 m)
- Position: Defender

Team information
- Current team: York City
- Number: 24

Youth career
- –2014: Nottingham Forest
- 2016–2017: Mickleover Sports

Senior career*
Years	Team	Apps	(Gls)
2017–2018	Mickleover Sports		
2018–2021	Coventry City	1	(0)
2019–2020	→ Yeovil Town (loan)	3	(0)
2020	→ Yeovil Town (loan)	3	(0)
2021–2026	Yeovil Town	160	(8)
2026–	York City	20	(1)
- * Club domestic league appearances and goals as of 12 September 2026

Morgan Gerald Williams (born 30 August 1999) is an English professional footballer who plays as a defender for EFL League Two club York City.

== Career ==
Williams began his football career in the youth system of Nottingham Forest before being released at under-15 level. After a few years out of the game Williams joined the youth team of non-league Mickleover Sports in September 2016. On 22 April 2017, Williams made his Northern Premier League Premier Division debut for Mickleover against Frickley Athletic. After being named in the 2017–18 Northern Premier League team of the season, Williams signed for Coventry City for a fee of £12,000 plus add-ons in July 2018.

He made his senior debut on 12 September 2018 in a 3-0 defeat against Arsenal U21 in the EFL Trophy, coming on as a substitute in the 61st minute for Dujon Sterling.

On 7 December 2019, Williams joined National League side Yeovil Town on loan until 4 January 2020. He returned to Yeovil Town on a one-month loan deal in October 2020.

On 12 May 2021 it was announced that he would leave Coventry at the end of the season, following the expiry of his contract. Following his release from Coventry, Williams signed permanently for National League side Yeovil Town on a two-year deal.

On 8 January 2026, Williams signed for fellow National League club York City for an undisclosed fee, after rejecting an offer of a new long-term contract with Yeovil Town.

== Career statistics ==
As of match played 5 September 2026

Appearances and goals by club, season and competition
Club	Season	League			FA Cup		League Cup		Other		Total	
Club	Season	Division	Apps	Goals	Apps	Goals	Apps	Goals	Apps	Goals	Apps	Goals
Coventry City	2018–19	League One	1	0	0	0	0	0	3 (Note: Appearance(s) in the EFL Trophy.)	0	4	0
Coventry City	2019–20	League One	0	0	0	0	0	0	2	0	2	0
Coventry City	2020–21	Championship	0	0	0	0	0	0	—		0	0
Coventry City	Total		1	0	0	0	0	0	5	0	6	0
Yeovil Town (loan)	2019–20	National League	3	0	0	0	—		1 (Note: Appearance(s) in FA Trophy)	0	4	0
Yeovil Town (loan)	2020–21	National League	3	0	1	0	—		0	0	4	0
Yeovil Town	2021–22	National League	33	1	3	0	—		6 (Note: One appearance and one goal in FA Trophy, five appearances and two goals in Somerset Premier Cup)	3	42	4
Yeovil Town	2022–23	National League	29	0	1	0	—		1	0	31	0
Yeovil Town	2023–24	National League South	45	4	4	0	—		0	0	49	4
Yeovil Town	2024–25	National League	28	2	1	0	—		1	0	30	2
Yeovil Town	2025–26	National League	24	1	1	0	—		0	0	25	1
Yeovil Town	Total		160	8	10	0	—		8	0	178	11
York City	2025–26	National League	15	1	—		—		0	0	15	1
York City	2026–27	League Two	5	0	0	0	1	0	0	0	6	0
York City	Total		20	1	0	0	1	0	0	0	21	1
Career total			187	9	11	0	1	0	14	3	213	12

== Honours ==
Yeovil Town

- National League South: 2023–24

York City

- National League: 2025–26
