= 2026–27 EFL League Two =

23rd season of EFL League Two

EFL League Two
- Season: 2026–27
- Dates: 15 August 2026 – May 2027
- Matches: 186
- Goals: 496 (2.67 per match)
- Top goalscorer: Kabongo Tshimanga (10 goals)
- Biggest home win: York City 4–0 Swindon Town (12 September 2026); Chesterfield 5–1 Crewe Alexandra (24 October 2026)
- Biggest away win: Rochdale 0–5 Accrington Stanley (24 October 2026)
- Highest scoring: Bristol Rovers 5–3 Newport County (22 August 2026)
- Longest winning run: 8 games Salford City
- Longest unbeaten run: 13 games Salford City
- Longest winless run: 10 games Colchester United
- Longest losing run: 4 games Oldham Athletic; Grimsby Town; Bristol Rovers; Rochdale
- Highest attendance: 11,106; Bristol Rovers 1–0 Exeter City (26 September 2026)
- Lowest attendance: 1,493; Accrington Stanley 3–2 Crawley Town (5 September 2026)
- All statistics correct as of 21 November 2026.

The 2026–27 EFL League Two, referred to as Sky Bet League Two due to sponsorship purposes, is the 23rd season of the EFL League Two under its current title, and the 35th season under its current league division format. The season began on 15 August 2026, and will end in May 2027.

== Team changes ==
The following teams have changed division since the 2025–26 season:

=== To League Two ===
Promoted from the National League

- York City
- Rochdale

Relegated from League One

- Exeter City
- Rotherham United
- Port Vale
- Northampton Town

=== From League Two ===
Promoted to League One

- Bromley
- Milton Keynes Dons
- Cambridge United
- Notts County

Relegated to the National League

- Harrogate Town
- Barrow

== Stadiums and locations ==
Locations of the 2026–27 EFL League Two teams
Locations of 2026–27 EFL League Two teams (Greater Manchester)

Note: Table lists in alphabetical order.

Team	Location	Stadium	Capacity
Accrington Stanley	Accrington	Crown Ground	5,450
Barnet	London (Canons Park)	The Hive Stadium	6,500
Bristol Rovers	Bristol (Horfield)	Memorial Stadium	12,500
Cheltenham Town	Cheltenham	Whaddon Road	7,066
Chesterfield	Chesterfield	SMH Group Stadium	10,292
Colchester United	Colchester	Colchester Community Stadium	10,105
Crawley Town	Crawley	Broadfield Stadium	6,134
Crewe Alexandra	Crewe	Gresty Road	10,153
Exeter City	Exeter	St James Park	8,219
Fleetwood Town	Fleetwood	Highbury Stadium	5,327
Gillingham	Gillingham	Priestfield Stadium	11,582
Grimsby Town	Cleethorpes	Blundell Park	9,546
Newport County	Newport	Rodney Parade	7,850
Northampton Town	Northampton (Sixfields)	Sixfields Stadium	8,203
Oldham Athletic	Oldham	Boundary Park	13,186
Port Vale	Stoke-on-Trent (Burslem)	Vale Park	16,800
Rochdale	Rochdale	Spotland Stadium	10,249
Rotherham United	Rotherham	New York Stadium	12,021
Salford City	Salford	Moor Lane	5,108
Shrewsbury Town	Shrewsbury	New Meadow	9,875
Swindon Town	Swindon	County Ground	14,753
Tranmere Rovers	Birkenhead (Prenton)	Prenton Park	16,587
Walsall	Walsall (Bescot)	Bescot Stadium	11,300
York City	York	York Community Stadium	8,500

== Personnel and sponsoring ==
Team	Manager	Captain	Kit manufacturer	Shirt sponsor (front)	Shirt sponsor (back)	Shirt sponsor (sleeve)	Shorts sponsor
Accrington Stanley	(England) John Doolan	(Republic of Ireland) Seamus Conneely	(Italy) Macron	Wham	Telana	Iterpro	Fagan & Whalley
Barnet	(Republic of Ireland) Dean Brennan	(England) Danny Collinge	(United States) Capelli	TIC Health	None	None	None
Bristol Rovers	(Scotland) Steve Evans	(England) Alfie Kilgour	(Germany) Puma	Hotchkins Group	Poplar Insulation	Hotchkins Group	Puff
Cheltenham Town	(England) Steve Cotterill	(Wales) James Wilson	(Germany) Adidas	Mira Showers	Marchants Coaches	Smarta Water; Smarta Energy	Jaydee Living
Chesterfield	(England) Paul Cook	(England) Tom Naylor	(Germany) Puma	Leengate Valves	PK Group	Leengate Valves	None
Colchester United	(England) Danny Cowley	(England) Jack Tucker	(Italy) Macron	The MEL Group	Pullingers Motorhomes	Peach Guitars	Bidfood
Crawley Town	(England) Kevin Blackwell	(England) Jude Arthurs	(Italy) Erreà	Uptime	Eden Utilities	C&A Contracts	The Drain Guys
Crewe Alexandra	(England) Lee Bell	(England) Mickey Demetriou	(Germany) Puma	Whitby Morrison	Zzoomm	Enviro Skip Hire	CAN Solutions
Exeter City	(England) Matt Taylor	(England) Jack Fitzwater	(Germany) Adidas	Nevada Construction	Taking Care Personal Alarms	None	AMS Global Solutions
Fleetwood Town	(England) Matt Lawlor	(Wales) Ched Evans	(Germany) Puma	Ruby Energy	Trevors Foodservice	Broadway Insurance Partners	That Prize Guy
Gillingham	(England) Gareth Ainsworth	(Scotland) Liam Gordon	(Italy) Macron	MEMS Power Generation	C&A Building Products	Pro Parts Kent	Howden
Grimsby Town	(Gibraltar) David Artell	(England) Kieran Green	(Italy) Lotto	Blackrow Group	Winner Winner Chicken Dinner	3Q Industrial Supplies	Roost Estate Agents
Newport County	(England) Hayden Mullins	(Scotland) Kyle Cameron	(England) VX3	Pure Vans	57 Tyres	Newport Galvanizers	Kingsley Build Group
Northampton Town	(England) Chris Hogg	(England) Jon Guthrie	(Germany) Puma	University of Northampton	Snowdon Homes	Green Ape Media	A M Water Services
Oldham Athletic	(Scotland) Micky Mellon	(England) Tom Pett	(Germany) Puma	Bunkabin	JW Lees	Old School BBQ	Northern 90 Scaffolding
Port Vale	(Australia) Jon Brady	(England) Ben Garrity	(Germany) Puma	Robbie Williams	Gleave Partnership	IronMarket	Suits Me
Rochdale	TBC	(England) Ethan Ebanks-Landell	(Republic of Ireland) O'Neills	Crown Oil	Andrew Kelly & Associates	HY Solicitors	Target Fire Protection
Rotherham United	(England) Alex Bruce	(Republic of Ireland) Joe Rafferty	(Denmark) Hummel	Rotherham Hospice	KCM Waste Management	None	Mears Group
Salford City	(Australia) Peter Cklamovski	(England) Luke Garbutt	(Germany) Adidas	AIG	Accenture	Holland & Barrett	None
Shrewsbury Town	(England) Gavin Cowan	(England) Will Boyle	(England) Oxen	Shropshire Homes	Jim Dorricott Construction Ltd	Hanmart Windows & Doors	Shropshire Mixed Concrete
Swindon Town	(England) Ian Holloway	(England) Ollie Clarke	(Germany) Adidas	Pro:Direct Sport	First City Care Group	Bravedog	Platinum Security Services
Tranmere Rovers	(England) Darrell Clarke	(Wales) Will Vaulks	(Indonesia) Mills	SURE Solutions	Acrisure	O'Rourke Construction	None
Walsall	(England) Lee Grant	None	(Italy) Macron	NoFo Brew Co	RayGray Snacks	Howard Evans Roofing and Cladding	RayGray Snacks
York City	(England) Scott Lindsey	(England) Ryan Fallowfield	(Denmark) Hummel	Titan Wealth	York College	Get Branded	3active

== Managerial changes ==
Team	Outgoing manager	Manner of departure	Date of vacancy	Position in the table	Incoming manager	Date of appointment
Northampton Town	(Scotland) Colin Calderwood	End of interim spell	2 May 2026	Pre-season	(England) Chris Hogg	18 May 2026
Rotherham United	(England) Lee Clark	End of contract	2 May 2026	Pre-season	(England) Alex Bruce	29 June 2026
Tranmere Rovers	(England) Pete Wild	End of contract	2 May 2026	Pre-season	(England) Darrell Clarke	26 May 2026
Walsall	(Jamaica) Darren Byfield	End of interim spell	2 May 2026	Pre-season	(England) Lee Grant	14 May 2026
Salford City	(England) Karl Robinson	Sacked	2 June 2026	Pre-season	(Australia) Peter Cklamovski	18 June 2026
Rochdale	(Scotland) Jimmy McNulty	Signed by Stockport County	5 June 2026	Pre-season	(England) Ian Watson	9 June 2026
Newport County	(Austria) Christian Fuchs	Resigned	27 June 2026	Pre-season	(Wales) Chris Todd (interim)	28 June 2026
York City	(England) Stuart Maynard	Sacked	26 July 2026	Pre-season	(England) Scott Lindsey	27 July 2026
Newport County	(Wales) Chris Todd	End of interim spell	31 July 2026	Pre-season	(England) Hayden Mullins	31 July 2026
Crawley Town	(Turkey) Colin Kazim-Richards	Sacked	21 October 2026	24th	(England) Kevin Blackwell (Note: Blackwell was initially appointed interim manager on a short-term contract on 21 October 2026, but his contract was extended until the end of the season on 19 November 2026.)	21 October 2026
Rochdale	(England) Ian Watson	Sacked	22 November 2026	22nd		

== League table ==
Pos	Team	Pld	W	D	L	GF	GA	GD	Pts	Promotion, qualification or relegation
1	Salford City	16	10	3	3	27	17	+10	33	Promotion to EFL League One
2	Barnet	14	8	5	1	30	19	+11	29	Promotion to EFL League One
3	Chesterfield	16	7	4	5	30	22	+8	25	Promotion to EFL League One
4	Grimsby Town	16	6	6	4	28	19	+9	24	Qualification for League Two play-offs
5	York City	16	6	6	4	25	21	+4	24	Qualification for League Two play-offs
6	Crewe Alexandra	16	5	9	2	22	22	0	24	Qualification for League Two play-offs
7	Walsall	14	5	8	1	21	12	+9	23	Qualification for League Two play-offs
8	Exeter City	16	6	5	5	13	10	+3	23	
9	Newport County	16	5	7	4	24	19	+5	22	
10	Tranmere Rovers	16	5	7	4	21	19	+2	22	
11	Gillingham	16	5	6	5	23	24	−1	21	
12	Cheltenham Town	16	6	3	7	23	29	−6	21	
13	Shrewsbury Town	16	6	3	7	20	27	−7	21	
14	Accrington Stanley	16	4	8	4	26	22	+4	20	
15	Fleetwood Town	16	5	5	6	20	20	0	20	
16	Bristol Rovers	16	6	1	9	20	25	−5	19	
17	Swindon Town	16	5	4	7	16	23	−7	19	
18	Northampton Town	15	4	6	5	13	13	0	18	
19	Port Vale	14	5	3	6	15	18	−3	18	
20	Oldham Athletic	16	4	4	8	17	22	−5	16	
21	Colchester United	15	3	6	6	15	21	−6	15	
22	Rochdale	16	4	3	9	19	30	−11	15	
23	Rotherham United	15	2	7	6	18	25	−7	13	Relegation to National League
24	Crawley Town	13	3	3	7	15	22	−7	12	Relegation to National League

Updated to match(es) played on 21 November 2026. Source: EFL Official Website
Rules for classification: 1) Points; 2) Goal difference; 3) Number of goals scored; 4) Head-to-head results; 5) Wins; 6) Away goals; 7) Penalty points (sec 9.5); 8) 12-point sending off offences

== Results ==
Home \ Away	ACC	BRN	BRI	CHT	CHF	COL	CRA	CRE	EXE	FLE	GIL	GRI	NEW	NOR	OLD	POV	ROC	ROT	SAL	SHR	SWI	TRA	WAL	YOR
Accrington Stanley	—			2–0		2–2	3–2				3–1	2–2	0–0	1–1					1–1					
Barnet	2–1	—		2–2						3–1					1–1	2–1			3–1		1–3			3–1
Bristol Rovers		1–3	—		0–2	2–0			1–0				5–3					1–0	1–2		0–0			
Cheltenham Town			0–3	—	2–1					4–2		2–2	1–0					2–1	0–2					3–2
Chesterfield		3–3			—	1–1		5–1		0–1	1–1									4–1		4–2		2–0
Colchester United				1–1		—		1–1	0–0		2–0				2–1		1–0						1–3	
Crawley Town			0–2	1–3	2–2		—	0–1		2–1										2–3		1–1		
Crewe Alexandra		1–1	3–1					—					2–2	1–0			3–2			1–1			2–2	1–1
Exeter City	2–0	1–1		1–0				2–0	—	2–1								1–0				0–0	0–0	
Fleetwood Town			3–1							—	0–0				1–1		1–2	2–0		2–0		1–0	1–1	
Gillingham			3–0					3–3			—	1–4	0–0	1–1		1–1						2–0	0–3	
Grimsby Town			2–0				2–0		1–0	2–2		—		0–2				0–0		1–2				5–2
Newport County					4–1	1–0				1–1		2–1	—				3–0				2–0	2–2		1–1
Northampton Town						2–0	1–1						1–0	—	0–1		3–2	0–1			0–0	0–1		
Oldham Athletic	0–0			4–1	1–2		0–1		1–1						—	2–0			1–4		3–0			
Port Vale	4–2				1–0			0–0	1–0			1–0				—	4–2					1–1		
Rochdale	0–5						1–2				1–4	2–2			2–0		—			3–0	1–0			0–1
Rotherham United					2–1			1–1			1–4		2–2					—	3–3	3–3				1–1
Salford City					0–1		2–1		2–1	1–0			2–1	1–1		1–0			—		1–0			
Shrewsbury Town		1–3	1–0			2–2			0–1		1–2			2–0	2–1				1–0	—				
Swindon Town	1–1		a	2–1		3–1		0–1				1–4				3–1		2–1			—		1–1	
Tranmere Rovers		1–2		3–1		2–1									2–0		1–1	2–2		2–0		—	1–1	
Walsall	3–2											0–0			3–0	2–0	0–0		2–4				—	
York City	1–1		3–2						2–1		3–0			1–1		2–0					4–0		0–0	—

Updated to match(es) played on 21 November 2026. Source: BBC Sport
Legend: Blue = home team win; Yellow = draw; Red = away team win.
For upcoming matches, an "a" indicates there is an article about the rivalry between the two participants.

== Season statistics ==
As of 21 November 2026

=== Top goalscorers ===
Rank	Player	Club	Goals
1	(England) Kabongo Tshimanga	Barnet	10
2	(Republic of Ireland) Aaron Drinan	Swindon Town	9
2	(Northern Ireland) Charlie McCann	Cheltenham Town	9
2	(Scotland) Aaron Pressley	Walsall	9
5	(Northern Ireland) Ronan Hale	Gillingham	8
5	(England) Paul Mullin	Rotherham United	8
7	(England) Ollie Pearce	York City	7
7	(England) Josh Woods	Accrington Stanley	7

=== Hat-tricks ===
Player	For	Against	Result	Date
(Republic of Ireland) Aaron Drinan	Swindon Town	Colchester United	3–1 (H)	5 September 2026

=== Most clean sheets ===
Rank	Player	Club	Clean sheets
1	(England) Jack Bycroft	Exeter City	8
2	(England) Jed Ward	Walsall	7
3	(England) Brad Young	Bristol Rovers	6
4	(England) Jay Lynch	Fleetwood Town	5
4	(England) Alfie McNally	York City	5
4	(England) Jordan Wright	Newport County	5

== Awards ==
=== Monthly ===
Each month the EFL announces their official Player of the Month and Manager of the Month.

Month	Manager of the Month		Player of the Month		Reference
August	(Republic of Ireland) Dean Brennan	Barnet	(England) Harry Boyes	York City	
September	(Australia) Peter Cklamovski	Salford City	(Northern Ireland) Charlie McCann	Cheltenham Town	
October	(Australia) Peter Cklamovski	Salford City	(England) Kabongo Tshimanga	Barnet	

== See also ==
- 2026–27 Premier League
- 2026–27 EFL Championship
- 2026–27 EFL League One
- 2026–27 National League
- 2026–27 EFL Cup
- 2026–27 FA Cup
- 2026–27 EFL Trophy
