= York City F.C. =

Association football club in York, England

- Full name: York City Football Club
- Nickname: The Minstermen
- Founded: 1922; 104 years ago
- Ground: York Community Stadium
- Capacity: 8,500
- Coordinates: 53°59′05″N 1°03′10″W
- Owners: 394 Sports (51%); FB Sports (24%); Marcel Smits (15%); York City Supporters' Trust (5%); Land First (2.5%); Alex Menn (2.5%)
- Co-chairs: Julie-Anne Uggla; Matt Uggla
- Head coach: Scott Lindsey
- League: EFL League Two
- 2025–26: National League, 1st of 24 (promoted)
- Website: www.yorkcityfootballclub.co.uk
Home colours

York City Football Club is a professional association football club based in the city of York, North Yorkshire, England. The club's first team compete in EFL League Two, the fourth level of the English football league system, as of the 2026–27 season.

Founded in 1922, the club played seven seasons in non-League football before joining the Football League. York played in the Third Division North and Fourth Division until 1959, when they were promoted for the first time. York achieved their best run in the FA Cup in 1954–55, when they met Newcastle United in the semi-final. They fluctuated between the Third and Fourth Divisions, before spending two seasons in the Second Division in the 1970s. York first played at Wembley Stadium in 1993, when they won the Third Division play-off final. At the end of 2003–04, they lost their Football League status after being relegated from the Third Division. The 2011–12 FA Trophy was the first national knockout competition won by York, and they returned to the Football League that season. York were relegated back into non-League football in 2016 before returning to the Football League ten years later.

York are nicknamed the Minstermen, after York Minster, and the team traditionally play in red kits. They played at Fulfordgate from 1922 to 1932, when they moved to Bootham Crescent, their home for 88 years. This ground had been subject to numerous improvements over the years, but the club lost ownership of it when it was transferred to a holding company in 1999. York bought it back five years later, but the terms of the loan used to do so necessitated a move to a new ground. They moved into their current ground, the York Community Stadium, in 2021. York have had rivalries with numerous clubs, but their traditional rivals are Hull City and Scarborough. The club's record appearance holder is Barry Jackson, who made 539 appearances, while their leading scorer is Norman Wilkinson, with 143 goals.

== History ==
=== 1922–1946: Foundation and establishment in Football League ===
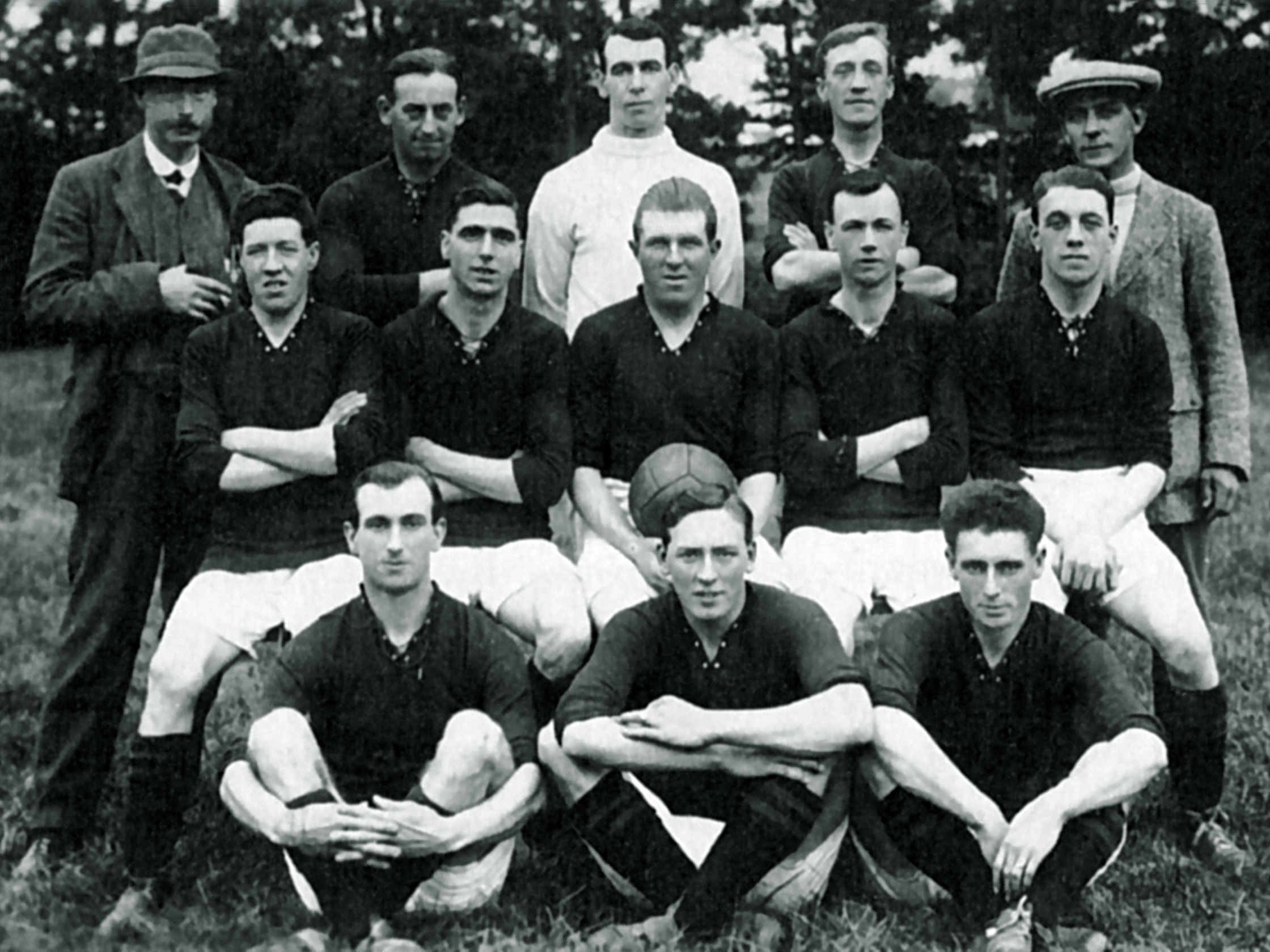
The York City squad before a match in 1922

The club was founded with the formation of the York City Association Football and Athletic Club Limited in May 1922 and subsequently gained admission to the Midland League. York ranked in 19th place in 1922–23 and 1923–24, and entered the FA Cup for the first time in the latter. York played in the Midland League for seven seasons, achieving a highest finish of sixth, in 1924–25 and 1926–27. They surpassed the qualifying rounds of the FA Cup for the first time in 1926–27, when they were beaten 2–1 by Second Division club Grimsby Town in the second round. The club made its first serious attempt for election to the Football League in May 1927, but this was unsuccessful as Barrow and Accrington Stanley were re-elected. However, the club was successful two years later, being elected to the Football League in June 1929 to replace Ashington in the Third Division North.

York won 2–0 against Wigan Borough in their first match in the Football League, and finished 1929–30 sixth in the Third Division North. Three years later, York only avoided having to seek re-election after winning the last match of 1932–33. In the 1937–38 FA Cup, they eliminated First Division teams West Bromwich Albion and Middlesbrough, and drew 0–0 at home to Huddersfield Town in the sixth round, before losing the replay 2–1 at Leeds Road. York had been challenging for promotion in 1937–38 before faltering in the closing weeks, and in the following season only avoided having to apply for re-election with victory in the penultimate match. They participated in the regional competitions organised by the Football League upon the outbreak of the Second World War in September 1939. York played in wartime competitions for seven seasons, and in 1942 won the Combined Counties Cup.

=== 1946–1981: FA Cup run, promotion and relegations ===
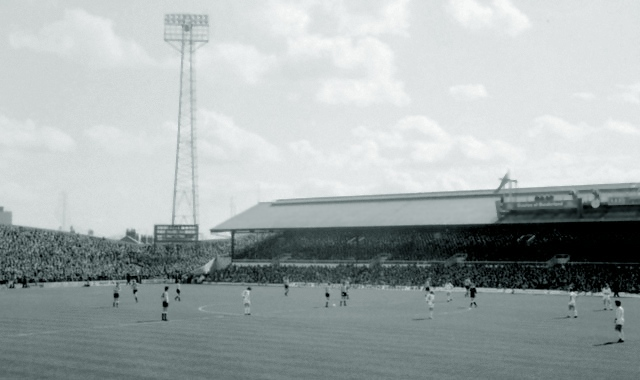
York played at Roker Park in their FA Cup semi-final replay with Newcastle United.

Peacetime football resumed in 1946–47 and York finished the next three seasons in midtable. However, they were forced to apply for re-election for the first time after finishing bottom of the Third Division North in 1949–50. York pursued promotion in 1952–53, before finishing fourth with 53 points, which were new club records in the Football League. The club's longest cup run came when they reached the semi-final of the 1954–55 FA Cup, a campaign in which Arthur Bottom scored eight goals. In the semi-final, York drew 1–1 with Newcastle United at Hillsborough, before being beaten 2–0 at Roker Park in the replay. This meant York had become the first third-tier club to play in an FA Cup semi-final replay. With a 13th-place finish in 1957–58, York became founder members of the Fourth Division, while the clubs finishing in the top half of the North and South sections formed the new Third Division.

York only missed out on the runners-up spot in 1958–59 on goal average, and were promoted for the first time in third place. However, they were relegated from the Third Division after just one season in 1959–60. York's best run in the League Cup came in 1961–62, the competition's second season, after reaching the fifth round. They were beaten 2–1 by divisional rivals Rochdale. York had to apply for re-election for the second time after finishing 22nd in 1963–64, but achieved a second promotion the next season, again in third place in the Fourth Division. York were again relegated after one season, finishing bottom of the Third Division in 1965–66. The club was forced to apply for re-election in three successive seasons, from 1966–67 to 1968–69, after finishing in the bottom four of the Fourth Division in each of those seasons. York's record of earning promotion every six years was maintained in 1970–71, with a fourth-place finish in the Fourth Division.

York avoided relegation from the Third Division in 1971–72 and 1972–73, albeit only on goal average in both seasons. After these two seasons they hit form in 1973–74, when "three up, three down" was introduced to the top three divisions. After being among the leaders most of the season, York were promoted to the Second Division for the first time in third place. The club's highest-ever league placing was achieved in mid October 1974 when York were fifth in the Second Division, and they finished 1974–75 in 15th place. York finished in 21st place the following season, and were relegated back to the Third Division. York dropped further still, being relegated in 1976–77 after finishing bottom of the Third Division. The 1977–78 season culminated in the club being forced to apply for re-election for the sixth time, after ranking third from bottom in the Fourth Division. Two midtable finishes followed before York made their seventh application for re-election, after they finished bottom of the Fourth Division in 1980–81.

=== 1981–2004: Further promotions and relegation from Football League ===
York's league positions since the 1929–30 season

In 1981–82, York endured a club-record run of 12 home matches without victory, but only missed out on promotion in 1982–83 due to their poor away form in the second half of the season. York won the Fourth Division championship with 101 points in 1983–84, becoming the first Football League team to achieve a three-figure points total in a season. In January 1985, York recorded a 1–0 home victory over First Division Arsenal in the fourth round of the 1984–85 FA Cup, courtesy of an 89th-minute penalty scored by Keith Houchen. They proceeded to draw 1–1 at home with European Cup holders Liverpool in February 1985, but lost 7–0 in the replay at Anfield; York's record cup defeat. The teams met again in the following season's FA Cup, and after another 1–1 home draw, Liverpool won 3–1 in the replay after extra time at Anfield. Their finish of seventh in the Third Division in 1985–86 marked the fifth consecutive season York had improved their end-of-season league ranking.

York avoided relegation with a draw in the last match of 1986–87, but did go down the following season after finishing second from bottom in the Third Division. In 1992–93, York ended a five-year spell in the Third Division by gaining promotion to the Second Division via the play-offs. Crewe Alexandra were beaten in the play-off final at Wembley Stadium, with a 5–3 penalty shoot-out victory following a 1–1 extra time draw. York reached the Second Division play-offs at the first attempt, but lost 1–0 on aggregate to Stockport County in the semi-final. York recorded a 4–3 aggregate victory in the 1995–96 League Cup second round over the eventual Premier League and FA Cup double winners Manchester United. This included a 3–0 win in the first leg at Old Trafford against a strong United team that included some younger players, and a more experienced United team was unable to overcome the deficit in the second leg, York losing 3–1. They then beat Everton in the second round of the following season's League Cup; they drew the first leg 1–1 at Goodison Park, but won the second leg 3–2 at home.

York were relegated from the Second Division in 1998–99, after dropping into 21st place on the last day of the season. In December 2001, long-serving chairman Douglas Craig put the club and its ground up for sale for £4.5 million, before announcing that the club would resign from the Football League if a buyer was not found. Motor racing driver John Batchelor took over the club in March 2002, and by December the club had gone into administration. The Supporters' Trust (ST) bought the club in March 2003 after an offer of £100,000 as payment for £160,000 owed in tax was accepted by the Inland Revenue. Batchelor left having diverted almost all of the £400,000 received from a sponsorship deal with Persimmon to his racing team, and having failed to deliver on his promise of having ST members on the board. York failed to win any of their final 20 league fixtures in 2003–04 and finished bottom of the Third Division. This meant the club was relegated to the Football Conference, ending 75 years of Football League membership.

=== 2004–present: Years in non-League and two promotions into Football League ===
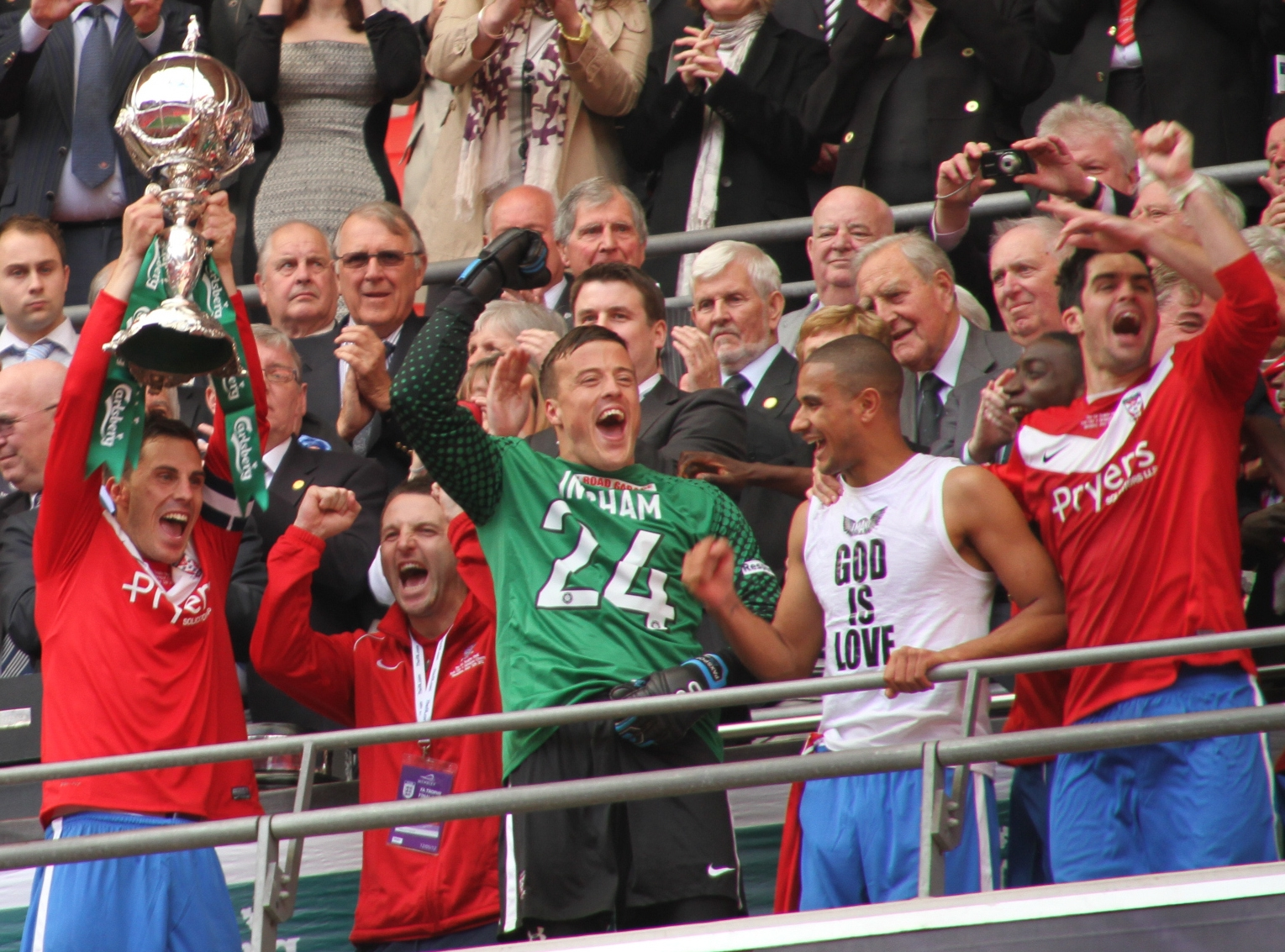
York players after the club's victory in the 2012 FA Trophy final

York avoided relegation late into their first Conference National season in 2004–05, before reaching the play-off semi-final in 2006–07, when they were beaten 2–1 on aggregate by Morecambe. Having escaped relegation towards the end of 2008–09, York participated in the 2009 FA Trophy final, and were defeated 2–0 by Stevenage Borough at Wembley Stadium. They reached the 2010 Conference Premier play-off final at Wembley Stadium, but were beaten 3–1 by Oxford United. York won their first national knockout competition two years later, after they beat Newport County 2–0 in the 2012 FA Trophy final at Wembley Stadium. A week later they earned promotion to League Two after they beat Luton Town 2–1 at Wembley Stadium in the 2012 Conference Premier play-off final, marking the club's return to the Football League after an eight-year absence.

York secured survival from relegation late into 2012–13, their first season back in the Football League. They made the League Two play-offs the following season, and were beaten 1–0 on aggregate by Fleetwood Town in the semi-final. However, York were relegated to the National League four years after returning to the Football League, with a bottom-place finish in League Two in 2015–16. York were further relegated to the National League North for the first time in 2016–17; however, they ended the season with a 3–2 win over Macclesfield Town at Wembley Stadium in the 2017 FA Trophy final. The club was promoted back to the National League at the end of the 2021–22 season via the play-offs, with a 2–0 victory over Boston United in the final. The ST purchased JM Packaging's 75% share of the club in July 2022 to regain its 100% shareholding, before transferring 51% of those shares to businessman Glen Henderson, who took over as chairman.

Another takeover took place nearly a year later in June 2023 when Julie-Anne and Matt Uggla, via their company 394 Sports, purchased Henderson's 51% shareholding in the club, with the pair becoming co-chairs. York regained their Football League membership after ten years in non-League football with promotion to League Two by winning the 2025–26 National League championship with 108 points. The title was secured with an equalising goal York scored in the 13th minute of stoppage time of the final match of the season, a 1–1 draw away to their title rivals Rochdale.

== Club identity ==
York are nicknamed "the Minstermen", in reference to York Minster. It is believed to have been coined by a journalist who came to watch the team during a successful cup run, and was only first used officially in literature in 1972. Before this, York were known as "the Robins", because of the team's red shirts. They were billed "the Happy Wanderers", after a popular song, at the time of their run in the 1954–55 FA Cup.

The original kit colours worn in the 1922–23 season

For most of the club's history, York have worn red shirts. However, in the club's first season, 1922–23, the kit comprised maroon shirts, white shorts and black socks were worn. Maroon and white striped shirts were worn for three years in the mid 1920s, before the maroon shirts returned. In 1933, York changed their maroon jerseys to chocolate and cream stripes, a reference to the city's association with the confectionery industry. After four years they changed their colours to what were described as "distinctive red shirts", with the official explanation that the striped jerseys clashed with opponents too often. York continued to don red shirts before a two-year spell of wearing all-white kits from 1967 to 1969.

York resumed wearing maroon shirts with white shorts in 1969. To mark their promotion to the Second Division in 1974, a bold white "Y" was added to the shirts, which became known as the "Y-fronts". Red shirts returned in 1978, along with the introduction of navy blue shorts. In 2004, the club dropped navy from the kits and instead used plain red and white, until 2008 when a kit mostly of navy was introduced. For 2007–08, the club brought in a third kit, which comprised light blue shirts and socks, with maroon shorts. A kit with purple shirts was introduced for a one-off appearance in the 2009 FA Trophy final. Red shirts returned in 2010, and have been worn with red, navy blue, light blue and white shorts.

York City crest: 1978–2002

York adopted the city's coat of arms as their crest upon the club's formation, although it only featured on the shirts from 1950 to 1951. In 1959, a second crest was introduced, in the form of a shield that contained York Minster, the White Rose of York and a robin. This crest never appeared on the shirts, but from 1969 to 1973 they bore the letters "YCFC" running upwards from left to right, and from 1974 to 1978 the "Y-fronts" shirts included a stylised badge in which the "Y" and "C" were combined. The shirts bore a new crest in 1978, which depicted Bootham Bar, two heraldic lions and the club name in all-white, and in 1983 this was updated into a coloured version.

When Batchelor took over the club in 2002, the crest was replaced by one signifying the club's new name of "York City Soccer Club" and held a chequered flag motif. After Batchelor's one-year period at the club, the name reverted to "York City Football Club" and a new logo was introduced. It was selected following a supporters' vote held by the club, and the successful design was made by Michael Elgie. The badge features five lions, four of which are navy blue and are placed on a white Y-shaped background. The rest of the background is red with the fifth lion in white, placed between the top part of the "Y".

Tables of kit suppliers and shirt sponsors appear below:

Kit suppliers
Dates	Supplier
1975–1976	Umbro
1976–1982	Admiral
1982–1983	Le Coq Sportif
1983–1987	Hobott
1987–1988	Rodsport
1989–1991	ABC Sport
1991–1995	Cavendish Sports
1995–2001	Admiral
2001–2003	Own brand
2003–2017	Nike
2017–2018	Avec
2018–2021	Under Armour
2021–2024	Puma
2024–present	Hummel

Shirt sponsors
Dates	Sponsor
1981–1983	Newitt's
1984	Hansa
1984	Cameron's
1985–1990	Hansa
1990–1991	Flamingo Land
1991–2001	Portakabin
2001–2003	York Evening Press
2003–2005	Phoenix Software
2005–2009	CLP Industries
2009–2012	Pryers Solicitors
2012–2019	Benenden Health
2019–2023	JM Packaging
2023–present	Titan Wealth Holdings

== Grounds ==
=== Fulfordgate ===
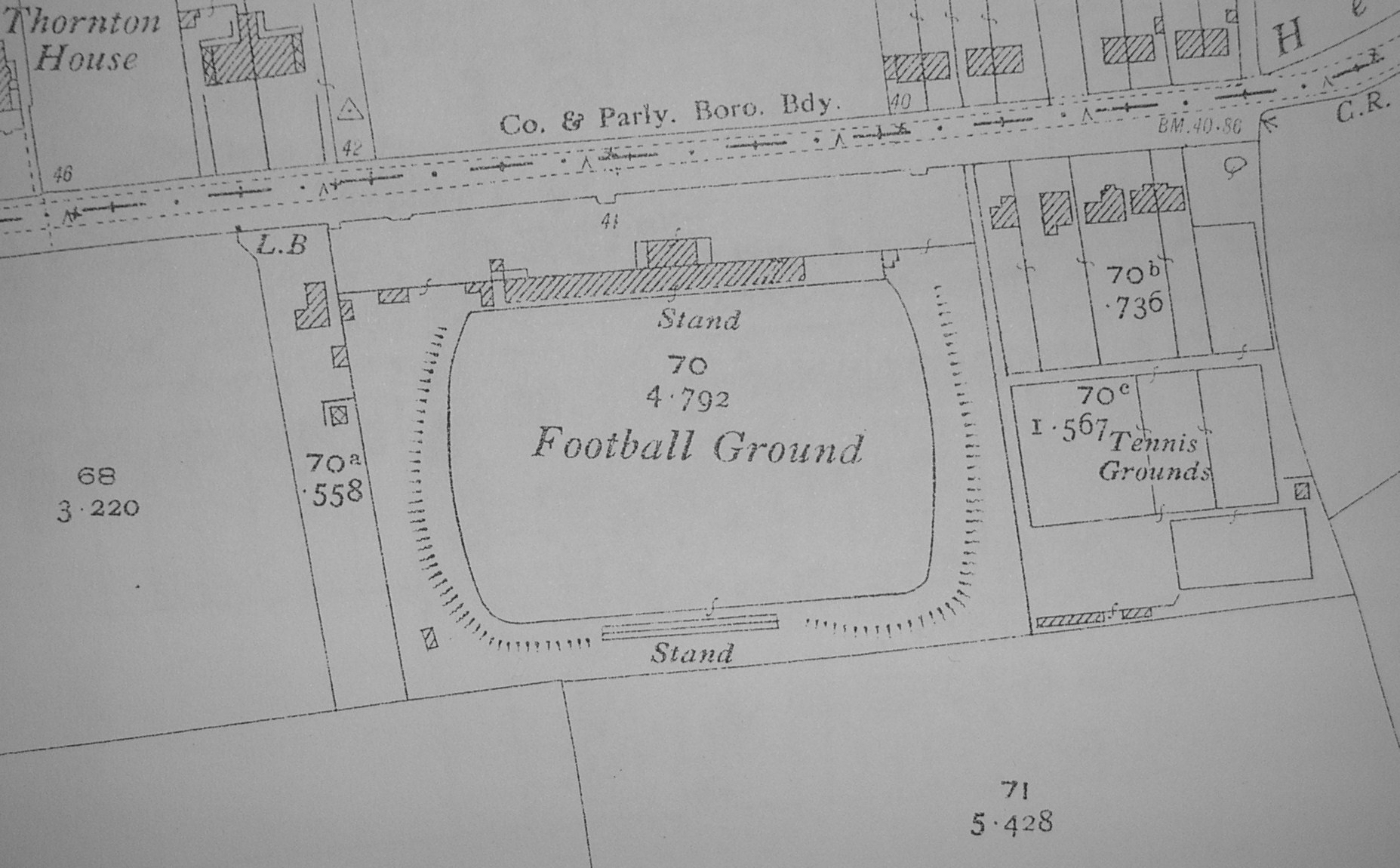
York played at Fulfordgate from 1922 to 1932.

York's first ground was Fulfordgate, which was located on Heslington Lane, Fulford in the south-east of York. With the ground not ready, York played their first two home matches at Mille Crux, Haxby Road, before they took to the field at Fulfordgate for a 4–1 win over Mansfield Town on 20 September 1922. Fulfordgate was gradually improved; terracing replaced banking behind one of the goals, the covered Popular Stand was extended to house 1,000 supporters, and a small seated stand was erected. By the time of York's election to the Football League in 1929, the ground was estimated to hold a capacity of 17,000. However, attendances declined in York's second and third Football League seasons, and the directors blamed this on the ground's location. In April 1932, York's shareholders voted to move to Bootham Crescent, which had been vacated by York Cricket Club, on a 21-year lease. This site was located near the city centre, and had a significantly higher population living nearby than Fulfordgate.

=== Bootham Crescent ===
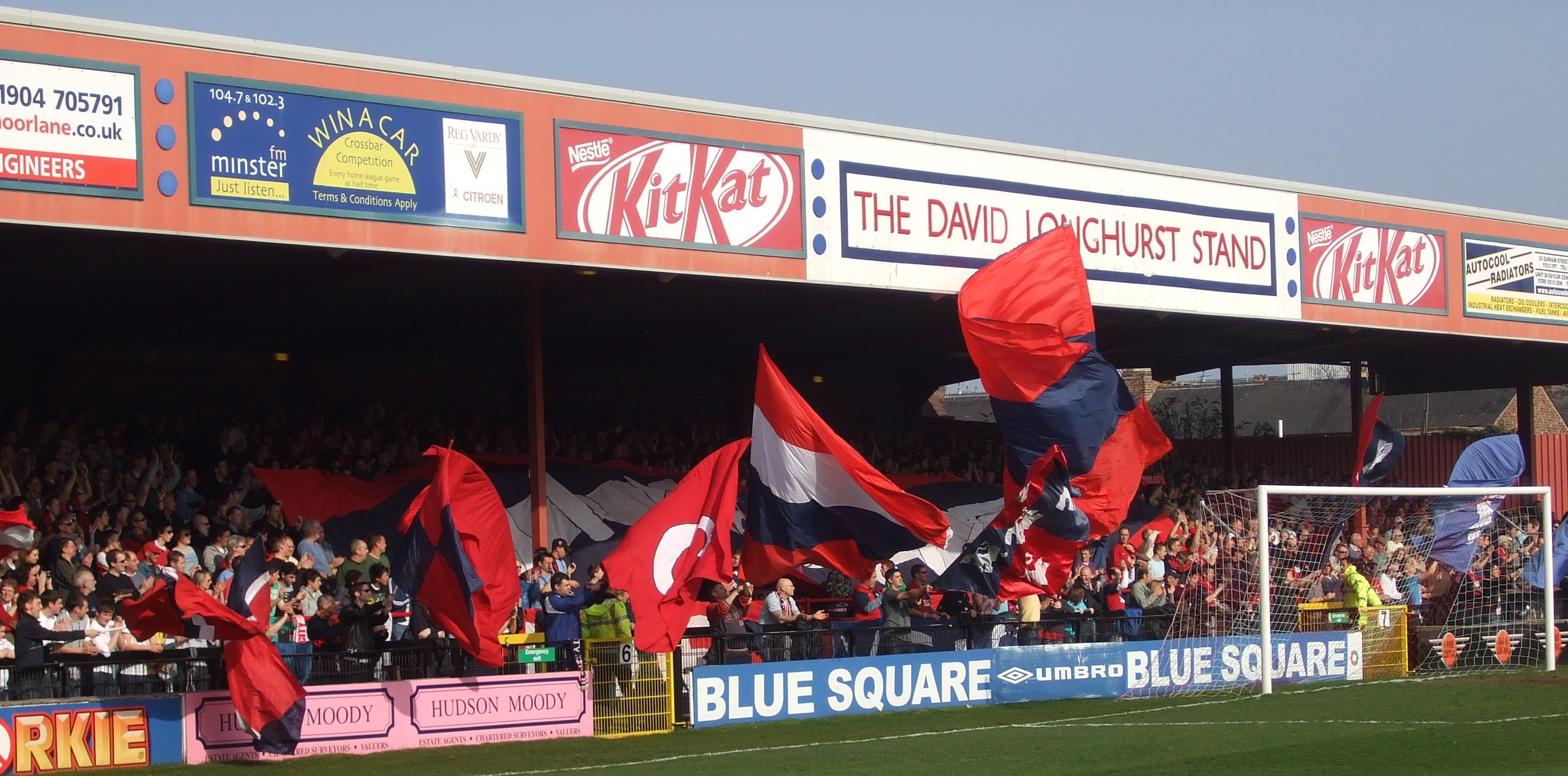
The David Longhurst Stand of Bootham Crescent in 2009

Bootham Crescent was renovated over the summer of 1932; the Main and Popular Stands were built and terraces were banked up behind the goals. The ground was officially opened on 31 August 1932, for York's 2–2 draw with Stockport County in the Third Division North. It was played before 8,106 supporters, and York's Tom Mitchell scored the first goal at the ground. There were teething problems in Bootham Crescent's early years: attendances were not higher than at Fulfordgate in its first four seasons, and there were questions over the quality of the pitch. In March 1938 the ground's record attendance was set when 28,123 people watched York play Huddersfield Town in the FA Cup. The ground endured slight damage during the Second World War, when bombs were dropped on houses along the Shipton Street End. Improvements were made shortly after the war ended, including the concreting of the banking at the Grosvenor Road End being completed.

With the club's finances in a strong position, York purchased Bootham Crescent for £4,075 in September 1948. Over the late 1940s and early 1950s, concreting was completed on the terracing in the Popular Stand and the Shipton Street End. The Main Stand was extended towards Shipton Street over the summer of 1955, and a year later a concrete wall was built at the Grosvenor Road End, as a safety precaution and as a support for additional banking and terracing. The ground was fitted with floodlights in 1959, which were officially switched on for a friendly against Newcastle United. The floodlights were updated and improved in 1980, and were officially switched on for a friendly with Grimsby Town. A gymnasium was built at the Grosvenor Road End in 1981, and two years later new offices for the manager, secretary, matchday and lottery manager were built, along with a vice-presidents' lounge.

During the early 1980s, the rear of the Grosvenor Road End was cordoned off as cracks had appeared in the rear wall, and this section of the ground was later segregated and allocated to away supporters. Extensive improvements were made over the mid 1980s, including new turnstiles, refurbished dressing rooms, new referees' changing room and physiotherapist's treatment room being readied, hospitality boxes being built to the Main Stand and crash barriers being strengthened. The David Longhurst Stand was constructed over the summer of 1991, and was named after the York player who collapsed and died from heart failure in a match a year earlier. It provided covered accommodation for supporters in what was previously the Shipton Street End, and was officially opened for a friendly match against Leeds United. In June 1995, new floodlights were installed, which were twice as powerful as the original floodlights.

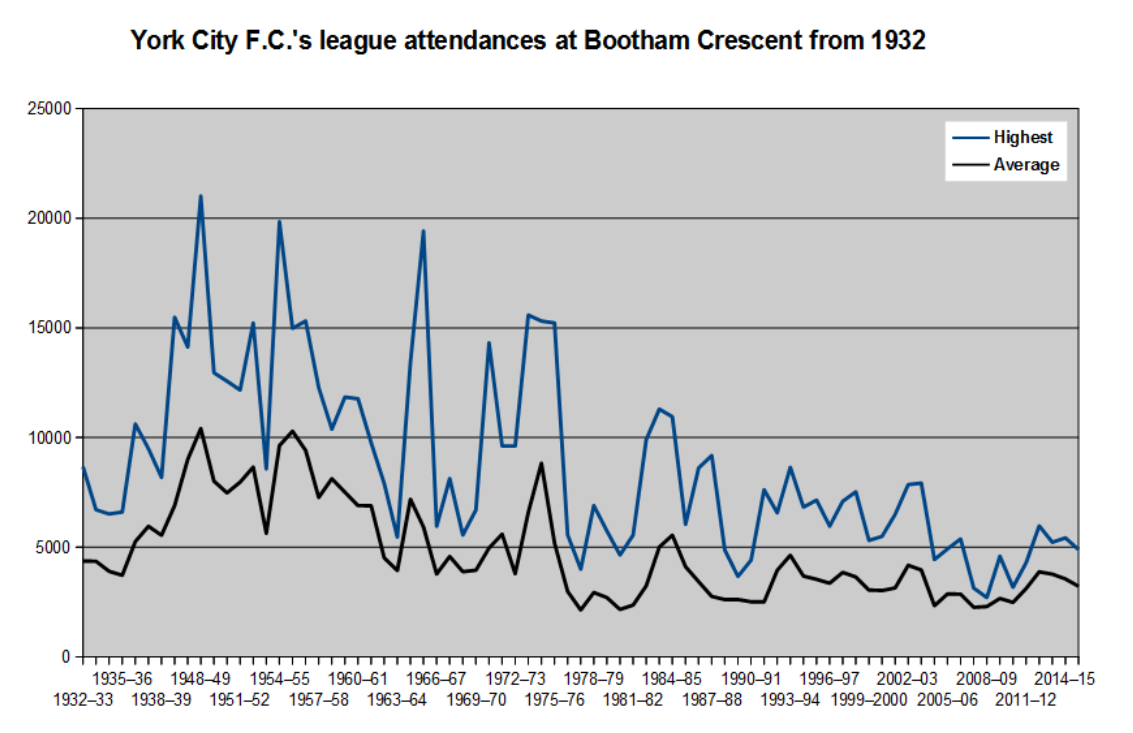
York's highest and average league attendances at Bootham Crescent from the 1932–33 season

In July 1999, York ceased ownership of Bootham Crescent when their real property assets were transferred to a holding company called Bootham Crescent Holdings. Craig announced the ground would close by 30 June 2002, and under Batchelor York's lease was replaced with one expiring in June 2003. In March 2003, York extended the lease to May 2004, and proceeded with plans to move to Huntington Stadium under the ownership of the Supporters' Trust. The club instead bought Bootham Crescent in February 2004, using a £2 million loan from the Football Stadia Improvement Fund (FSIF).

The ground was renamed KitKat Crescent in January 2005, as part of a sponsorship deal in which Nestlé made a donation to the club, although the ground was still commonly referred to as Bootham Crescent. The deal expired in January 2010, when Nestlé ended all their sponsorship arrangements with the club. There had not been any major investment in the ground since the 1990s, and it faced problems with holes in the Main Stand roof, crumbling in the Grosvenor Road End, drainage problems and toilet conditions.

=== York Community Stadium ===
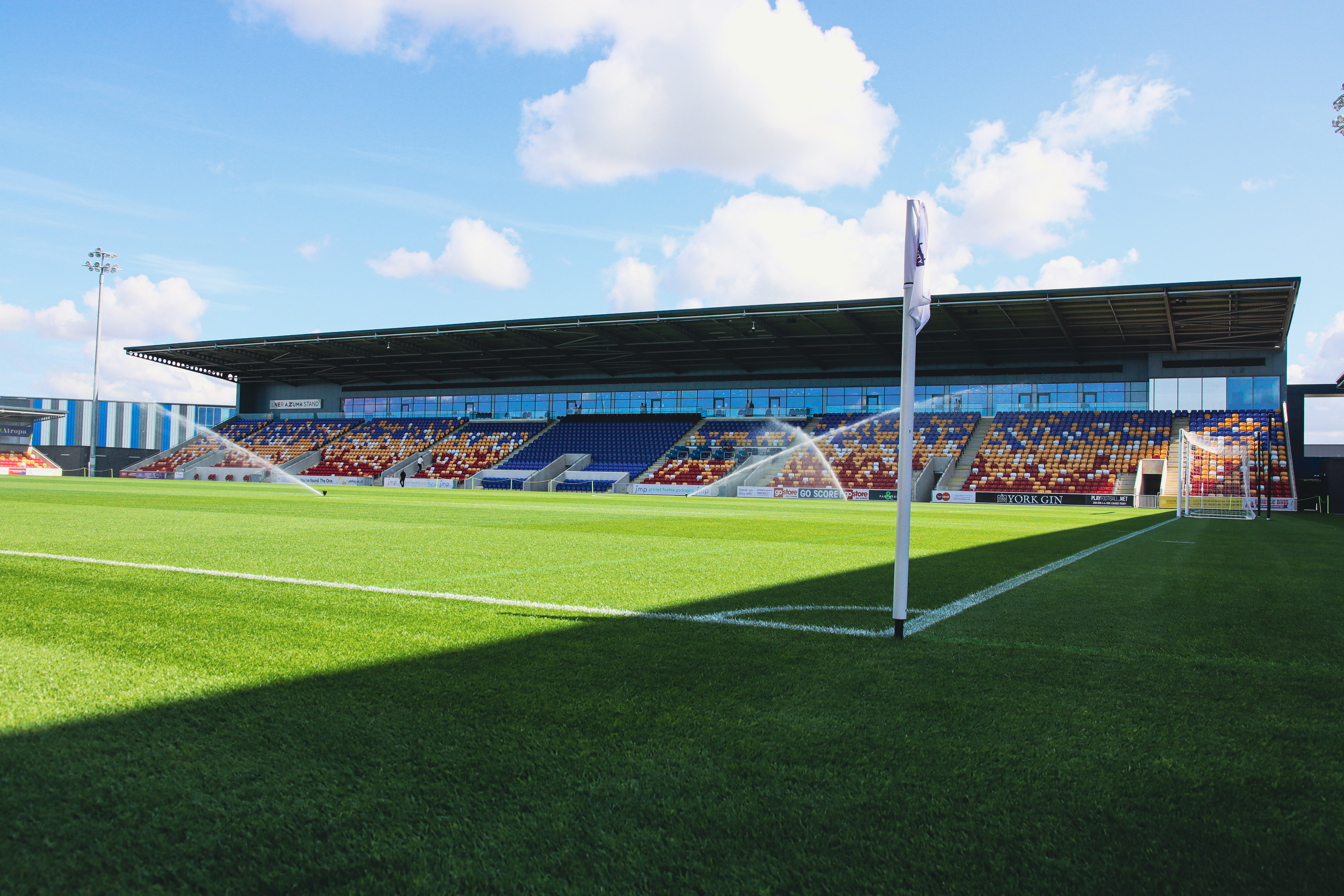
The East Stand at the York Community Stadium in 2021

Per the terms of the FSIF loan, the club was required to have identified a site for a new stadium by 2007, and have detailed planning permission by 2009, to avoid financial penalties. York failed to formally identify a site by the end of 2007, and by March 2008 plans had ground to a halt. In May 2008, City of York Council announced its commitment to building a community stadium, for use by York and the city's rugby league club, York City Knights. In July 2010, the option of building an all-seater stadium at Monks Cross in Huntington, on the site of Huntington Stadium, was chosen by the council. In August 2014, the council named GLL as the preferred bidder to deliver an 8,000 all-seater stadium, a leisure complex and a community hub. Construction started in December 2017, and after a number of delays, was completed in December 2020. The club officially moved into the stadium in January 2021, with the first match being a 3–1 defeat to AFC Fylde on 16 February, which was played behind closed doors because of the COVID-19 pandemic in the United Kingdom. The stadium holds an all-seated capacity of 8,500. The Minstermen's current highest attendance at the LNER is 8,219 in a 3–0 victory over Yeovil Town.

== Supporters and rivalries ==
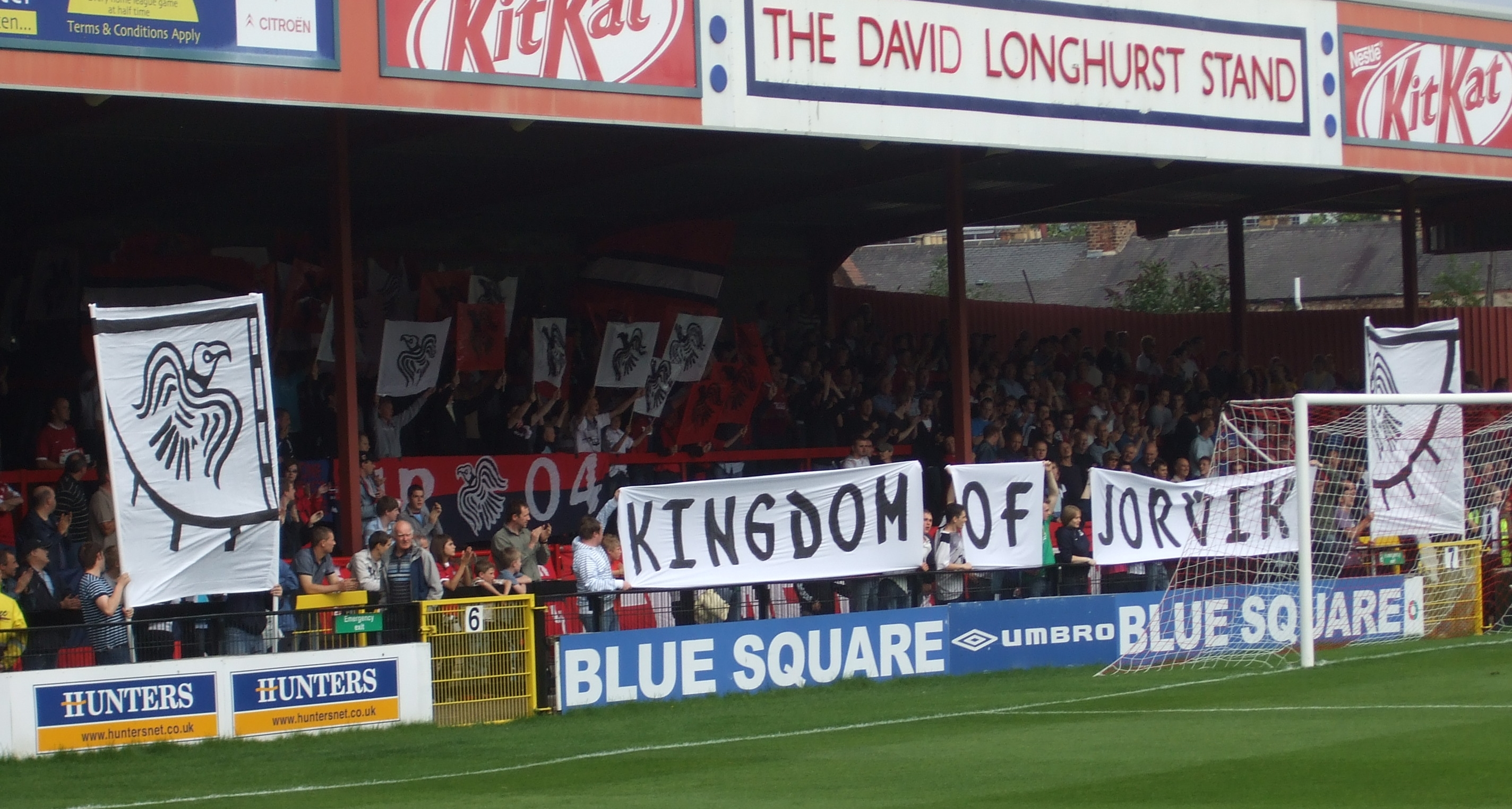
A Jorvik Reds display during a match in 2008

The club has a number of domestic supporters' groups, including the East Riding Minstermen, Harrogate Minstermen, York Minstermen, York City South and the Supporters' Trust. The now-disbanded group Jorvik Reds, who were primarily inspired by the continental ultras movement, were known for staging pre-match displays. The York Nomad Society is the hooligan firm associated with the club.

For home matches, the club produces a 60-page official match programme, entitled The Citizen. York have been the subject of a number of independent supporters' fanzines, including Terrace Talk, In The City, New Frontiers, Johnny Ward's Eyes, Ginner's Left Foot, RaBTaT and Y Front. The club mascot is a lion named Yorkie the Lion and he is known for performing comic antics before matches. John Sentamu, the Archbishop of York, became the club patron for 2007–08, having become a regular spectator at home matches as a season ticket holder.

The 2003 Football Fans Census revealed that no other team's supporters considered York to be among their club's main rivals. Traditionally, York's two main rivalries have been with Hull City and Scarborough. While York fans saw Hull as their main rival, this was not reciprocated by the East Yorkshire club, who saw Leeds United as their main rival. York also had a rivalry with Halifax Town and they were the team most local to York when the two played in the Conference. A rivalry with Luton Town developed during the club's final years in the Conference as both clubs met regularly in crucial matches, accompanied by a series of incidents involving crowd trouble, contentious transfers, and complaints about the behaviour of directors.

== Records and statistics ==
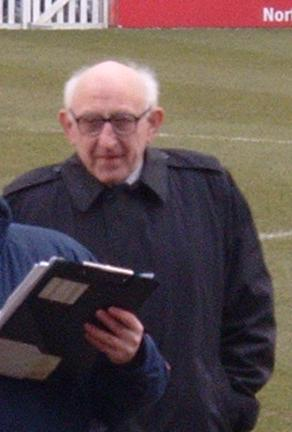
Norman Wilkinson is York's top goalscorer with 143 goals in all competitions

The record for the most appearances for York is held by Barry Jackson, who played 539 matches in all competitions. Jackson also holds the record for the most league appearances for the club, with 428. Norman Wilkinson is the club's top goalscorer with 143 goals in all competitions, which includes 127 in the league and 16 in the FA Cup. Six players, Keith Walwyn, Billy Fenton, Alf Patrick, Paul Aimson, Arthur Bottom and Tom Fenoughty, have also scored more than 100 goals for the club.

The first player to be capped at international level while playing for York was Eamon Dunphy, when he made his debut for the Republic of Ireland against Spain on 10 November 1965. The most capped player is Peter Scott, who earned seven caps for Northern Ireland while at the club. The first York player to score in an international match was Anthony Straker, who scored for Grenada against Haiti on 4 September 2015 in a 2018 FIFA World Cup qualification match.

York's largest victory was a 9–1 win over Southport in the Third Division North in 1957, while the heaviest loss was 12–0 to Chester City in 1936 in the same division. Their widest victory margin in the FA Cup is by six goals, which was achieved five times. These were 7–1 wins over Horsforth in 1924, Stockton Malleable in 1927 and Stockton in 1928, and 6–0 wins over South Shields in 1968 and Rushall Olympic in 2007. York's record defeat in the FA Cup was 7–0 to Liverpool in 1985.

The club's highest attendance at their former Fulfordgate ground was 12,721 against Sheffield United in the FA Cup on 14 January 1931, while the lowest was 1,500 against Maltby Main on 23 September 1925 in the same competition. Their highest attendance at Bootham Crescent was 28,123, for an FA Cup match against Huddersfield Town on 5 March 1938; the lowest was 608 against Mansfield Town in the Conference League Cup on 4 November 2008.

The highest transfer fee received for a York player is £950,000 from Sheffield Wednesday for Richard Cresswell on 25 March 1999, while the most expensive player bought is Adrian Randall, who cost £140,000 from Burnley on 28 December 1995. The youngest player to play for the club is Reg Stockill, who was aged 15 years and 281 days on his debut against Wigan Borough in the Third Division North on 29 August 1929. The oldest player is Paul Musselwhite, who played his last match aged 43 years and 127 days against Forest Green Rovers in the Conference on 28 April 2012.

== Players ==
=== First-team squad ===
Note: Flags indicate national team as defined under FIFA eligibility rules; some limited exceptions apply. Players may hold more than one non-FIFA nationality. Squad correct as of 21 November 2026.

York City F.C. first-team squad
No.	Pos.	Player	Nation
1	GK	Alfie McNally (on loan from Fulham until end of 2026–27 season)	England
2	DF	Ryan Fallowfield (club captain)	England
3	DF	Mark Kitching	England
4	DF	Zech Medley	England
5	DF	Zak Johnson	England
7	FW	Joe Grey	England
8	MF	Alex Hunt	England
9	FW	Josh Stones	England
10	FW	Ollie Pearce (vice-captain)	England
11	MF	Frankie Maguire	England
12	DF	Harry Boyes	England
15	DF	Jeff King	England
16	MF	Arthur Read	England
17	MF	Craig Hewitt	England
18	FW	Jovan Malcolm (on loan from Stevenage until January 2027)	England
21	MF	Hiram Boateng	England
23	DF	Joe Felix	England
24	DF	Morgan Williams	England
25	FW	Ben Farrar	England
26	MF	Ethan Stiver	Canada
28	MF	Ollie Banks	England
30	FW	Alex Newby	England
31	GK	George Sykes-Kenworthy	England
32	DF	Jack Hunt	England
35	DF	Isaac Swansbury	England
36	DF	Lewis Beadle	England
37	MF	Ollie Belleh	England
38	MF	Luka Ozisik	England
39	MF	Jack Turner	England
40	FW	Charlie Webster	England
41	GK	Campbell White	England
42	DF	Oscar Woolford	England
43	DF	DJ Penrose	England
44	MF	Blake Appleyard	England

=== Out on loan ===
Note: Flags indicate national team as defined under FIFA eligibility rules; some limited exceptions apply. Players may hold more than one non-FIFA nationality.

York City F.C. first-team players out on loan
No.	Pos.	Player	Nation
6	DF	Ash Palmer (at Southend United until 14 January 2027)	England
14	DF	Ben Brookes (at Sutton United until mid December 2026)	England
19	MF	Mark Shelton (at Grimsby Town until end of 2026–27 season)	England
20	FW	Dipo Akinyemi (at Eastleigh)	England
33	DF	Charlie McArthur (at Woking until November 2026)	Scotland

== Club officials ==
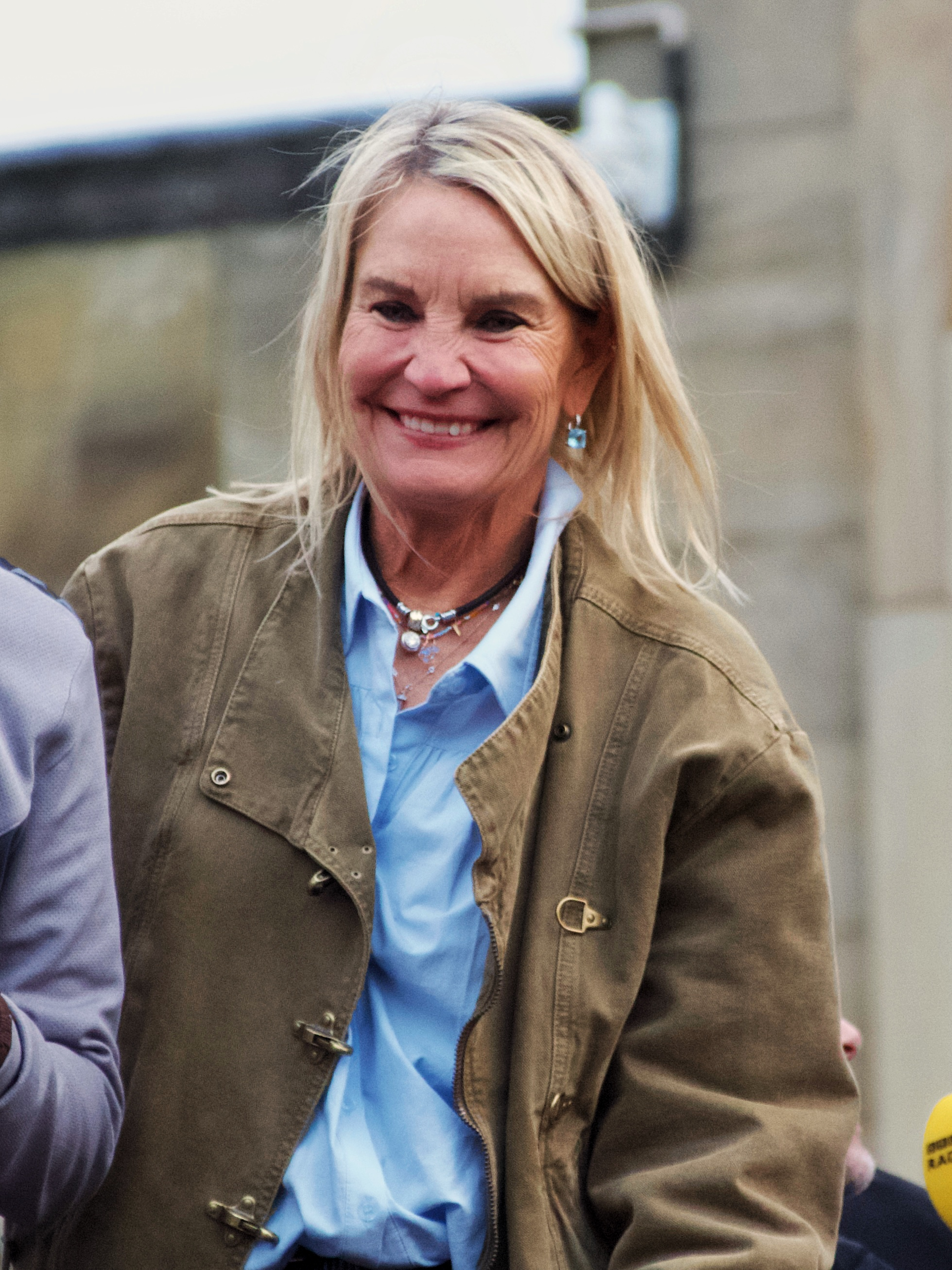
Julie-Anne Uggla (pictured in 2026) has served as co-chair since 2023.

Ownership

As of 3 July 2026

- 394 Sports (51%)
- FB Sports (24%)
- Marcel Smits (15%)
- York City Supporters' Trust (5%)
- Land First (2.5%)
- Alex Menn (2.5%)

Board

As of 1 February 2024

- Co-chairs: Julie-Anne Uggla • Matt Uggla
- Directors: James Daniels • Alastair Smith • Simon Young

Management and backroom staff

As of 27 July 2026

- Head coach: Scott Lindsey
- Assistant manager: João Alves
- First-team coach: Gary Elphick
- Goalkeeping coach: Steve Collis
- Strength & conditioning coach: Olly Parker
- Kit & equipment manager: Lewis Saleem
- Head of science & medicine: Sam Mannings
- Analyst: Louie Pearce
- Assistant analyst: Diego Walker
- Chief medical officer: Dane Vishnubala
- Masseuse: Kevin Hornsby
- Scout: Marvin Armstrong

== Honours ==
York City's honours include the following:

League

- Third Division (level 3)
  - Promoted: 1973–74
- Fourth Division / Third Division (level 4)
  - Champions: 1983–84
  - Promoted: 1958–59, 1964–65, 1970–71
  - Play-off winners: 1993
- Conference Premier / National League (level 5)
  - Champions: 2025–26
  - Play-off winners: 2012
- National League North (level 6)
  - Play-off winners: 2022

Cup

- FA Trophy
  - Winners: 2011–12, 2016–17
  - Runners-up: 2008–09
