= George Sykes-Kenworthy =

English footballer (born 1999)

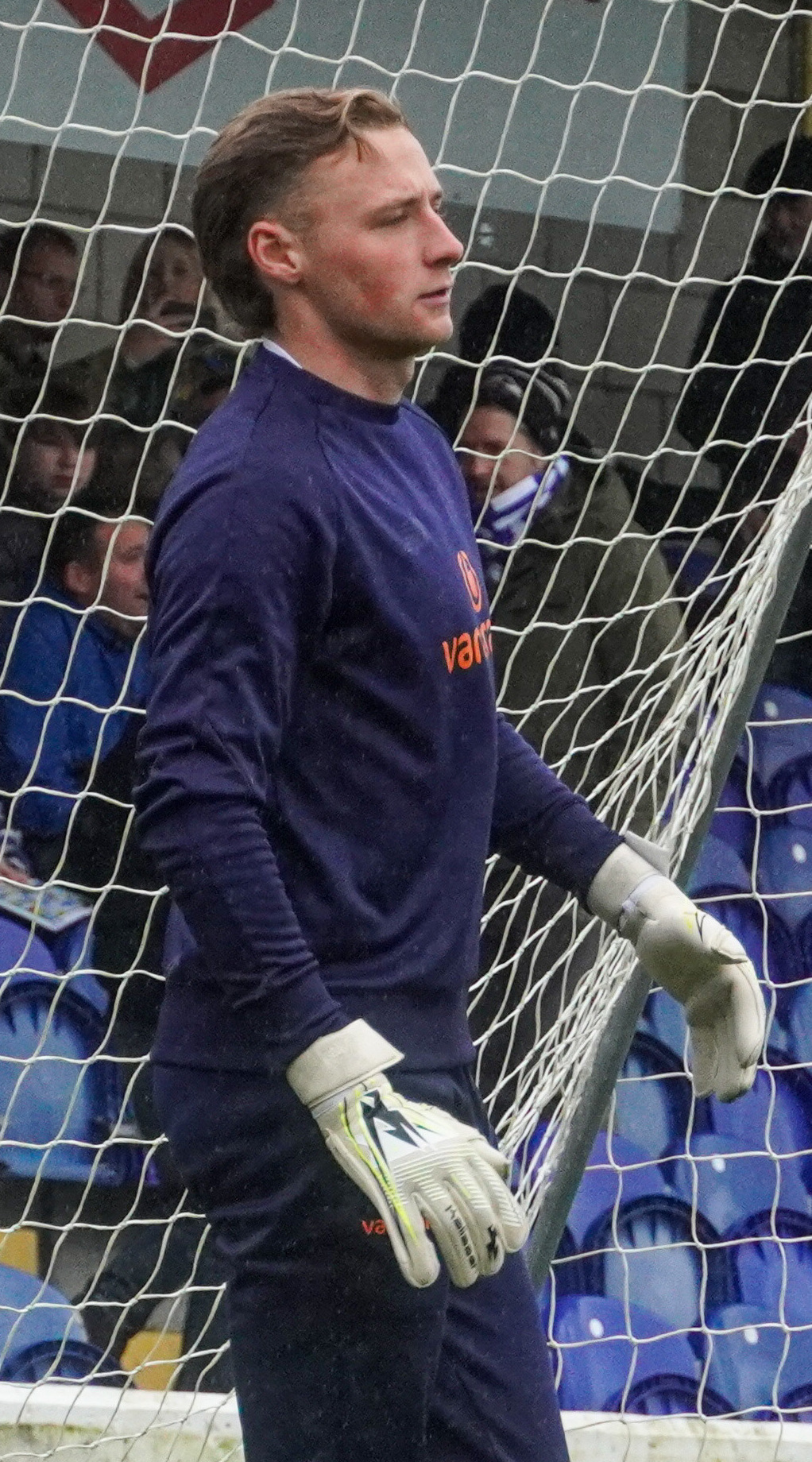
- Sykes-Kenworthy in 2023

Personal information
- Full name: George William Sykes-Kenworthy
- Date of birth: 1 October 1999 (age 27)
- Place of birth: Huddersfield, England
- Height: 6 ft 0 in (1.82 m)
- Position: Goalkeeper

Team information
- Current team: York City
- Number: 31

Youth career
- 2007–2017: Bradford City

Senior career*
Years	Team	Apps	(Gls)
2017–2020	Bradford City	0	(0)
2018	→ Stalybridge Celtic (loan)	10	(0)
2018–2019	→ Stafford Rangers (loan)	5	(0)
2019	→ Guiseley (loan)	9	(0)
2020–2021	Derby County	0	(0)
2021	Boston United	5	(0)
2021–2023	Bradford (Park Avenue)	87	(0)
2023–	York City	24	(0)
- * Club domestic league appearances and goals as of 14:33, 21 April 2024 (UTC)

George William Sykes-Kenworthy (born 1 October 1999) is an English professional footballer who plays as a goalkeeper for EFL League Two club York City.

Sykes-Kenworthy began his career with Bradford City, spending time on loan at non-league clubs Stalybridge Celtic, Stafford Rangers and Guiseley. After a season with Derby County, he returned to non-league football, playing for Boston United, Bradford (Park Avenue) and York City.

== Career ==
Born in Huddersfield, West Yorkshire, Sykes-Kenworthy began playing for Bradford City at under-8 level, and signed a two-year professional contract in March 2018. Later that month he joined Stalybridge Celtic on loan, making 11 appearances in all competitions. His loan spell was intended by Bradford City to help the player's growth.

In May 2018 he was named Bradford City's 'Youth Team Player of the Year' for the 2017–18 season.

He signed a one-month loan deal with Stafford Rangers in December 2018. He made 5 league appearances.

In July 2019 he signed on loan for Guiseley. His loan ended in September 2019, with Bradford City manager Gary Bowyer saying he was considering sending him back out on loan. He made his senior debut for Bradford City later that month, in the EFL Trophy.

On 26 May 2020, it was announced that he was one of 10 players who would leave Bradford City when their contract expired on 30 June 2020.

On 15 October 2020, it was announced that he had joined Derby County, joining the club's under-23 side. On 14 June 2021, it was announced that he would leave Derby at the end of the season, following the expiry of his contract.

On 7 August 2021, after a series of games as a trialist, it was announced that he had signed a deal with Boston United for the 2021–22 season.

On 4 December 2021, Sykes-Kenworthy signed for National League North side Bradford (Park Avenue). He was "ever-present" in the first team, and in January 2023 said he hoped one day to return to League football. He became club captain for the 2023–24 season, and manager Mark Bower challenged Sykes-Kenworthy to become a leader for the club.

After 17 appearances for Park Avenue in the 2023–24 season, he transferred to York City in October 2023 for an undisclosed fee.
