= Ash Palmer =

English footballer (born 1992)

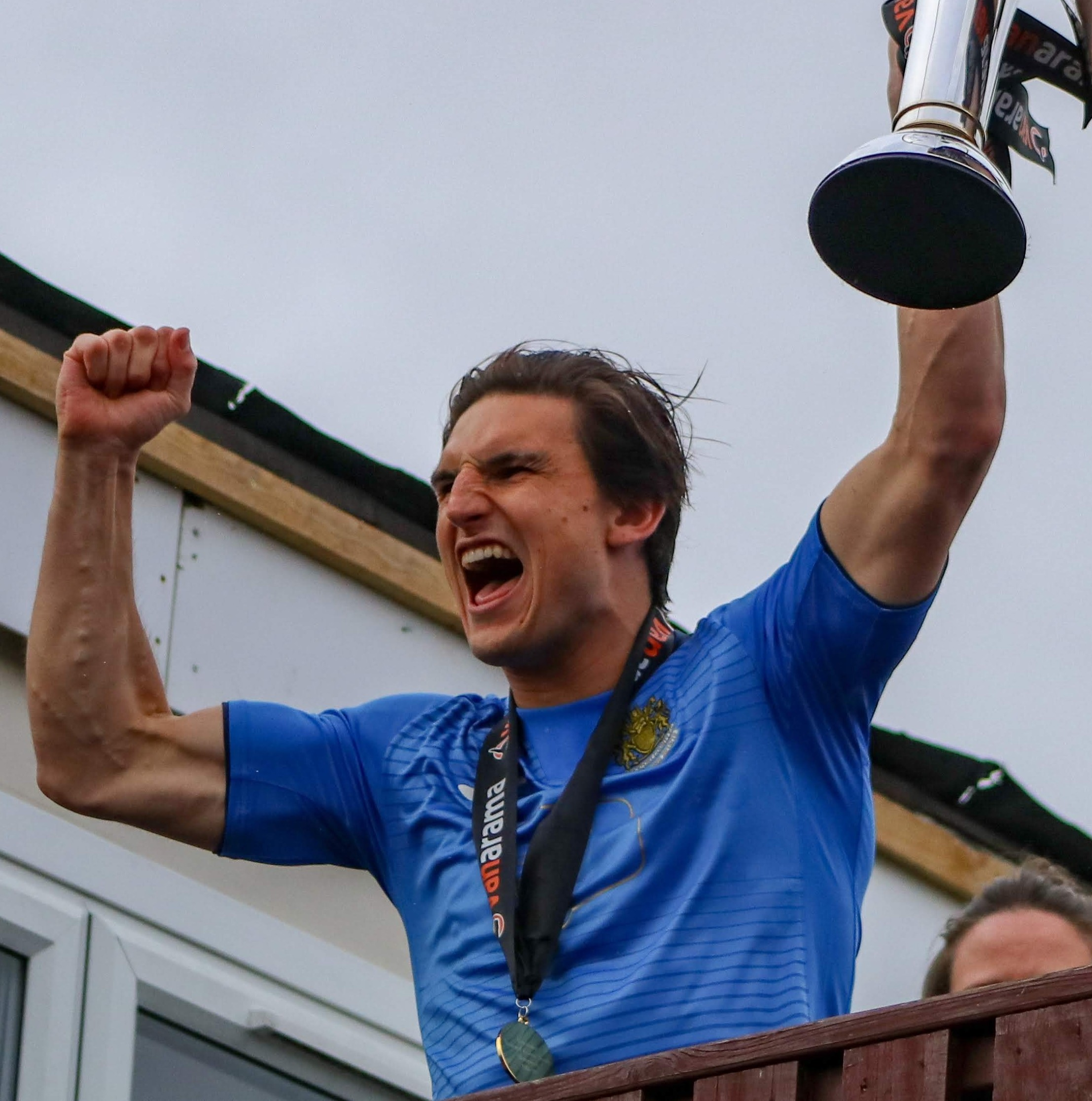
- Palmer in 2019

Personal information
- Full name: Ashley John Palmer
- Date of birth: 9 November 1992 (age 34)
- Place of birth: Pontefract, West Yorkshire, England
- Height: 6 ft 1 in (1.85 m)
- Position: Centre-back

Team information
- Current team: Southend United

Youth career
- Barnsley
- 2009–2011: Scunthorpe United

Senior career*
Years	Team	Apps	(Gls)
2011–2012	Scunthorpe United	1	(0)
2012	→ Southport (loan)	0	(0)
2012	→ Harrogate Town (loan)	3	(0)
2012	Hinckley United	4	(0)
2012–2013	Droylsden	14	(1)
2013–2015	Buxton	?	(?)
2015–2016	North Ferriby United	44	(3)
2016–2018	Guiseley	71	(1)
2018–2022	Stockport County	153	(14)
2022–2025	Chesterfield	65	(6)
2025–	York City	6	(0)
2026	→ FC Halifax Town (loan)	10	(0)
2026-	→ Southend United (loan)	0	(0)

International career
2022	England C	1	(0)
- * Club domestic league appearances and goals as of 09:50, 8 March 2026 (UTC)

Ashley John Palmer (born 9 November 1992) is an English professional footballer who plays as a defender for National League club Southend United, on loan from EFL League Two club York City.

== Career ==
Palmer progressed through the Barnsley youth ranks but was released in February 2009 and signed for Scunthorpe United where he became youth team captain. Palmer signed his first professional contract in June 2010 on a one-year deal. He made his professional debut on 30 August 2011, in the Football League Trophy 2–0 win over Hartlepool United at Glanford Park.

He joined Southport on loan in January 2012. Later that season he joined Harrogate Town on loan and made his club debut in a 2–1 home defeat to Vauxhall Motors. He was released by Scunthorpe in May 2012.

Palmer signed for Hinckley United in September 2012. He made his debut in a 2–0 home loss against FC Halifax Town a day later. In October, he moved, signing for Droylsden.

In June 2015, Palmer signed for FA Trophy holders North Ferriby United bringing to an end his two-year stay at Buxton. Palmer won promotion to the National League and was awarded Player of the Year at North Ferriby, an accolade he had also received in the 2014/15 season while playing for Buxton.

After spending two seasons at Guiseley, Palmer joined Stockport County in July 2018. Palmer established himself as a crucial member of the Stockport defence in their title winning 2018/19 campaign, often captaining the side in the absence of club captain Paul Turnbull.

Palmer further consolidated his presence in the Stockport back line during the 2019/20 season with a string of highly consistent performances which saw also saw him score five league goals, leaving him Stockport's third top scorer for the season behind Elliot Osbourne and Nyal Bell.

After promotion to the Football League in the 2021–22 season, Palmer signed a new one-year contract with the club in June 2022 to keep him with the club for a fifth season.

On 25 November 2022, Palmer returned to the National League when he signed for Chesterfield for an undisclosed fee, signing an eighteen-month contract.

In June 2025, Palmer joined National League side York City, from where he was loaned to FC Halifax Town in 2026.

== International career ==
In March 2022, Palmer was called up to represent England C and made his debut on 30 March 2022 against Wales C, a League of Wales representative team. Palmer captained England on the night.

== Career statistics ==
As of 5 June 2025

Appearances and goals by club, season and competition
Club	Season	League			FA Cup		League Cup		Other		Total	
Club	Season	Division	Apps	Goals	Apps	Goals	Apps	Goals	Apps	Goals	Apps	Goals
Scunthorpe United	2011–12	League One	1	0	0	0	0	0	1 (Note: Appearance(s) in EFL Trophy)	0	2	0
Southport (loan)	2011–12	Conference Premier	0	0	0	0	—		0	0	0	0
Harrogate Town (loan)	2011–12	Conference North	3	0	0	0	—		0	0	3	0
Hinckley United	2012–13	Conference North	4	0	0	0	—		0	0	4	0
Droylsden	2012–13	Conference North	14	1	0	0	—		0	0	14	1
Buxton	2013–14	NPL – Premier Division					—					
Buxton	2014–15	NPL – Premier Division					—					
Buxton	Total											
North Ferriby United	2015–16	National League North	44	3	2	0	—		0	0	46	3
Guiseley	2016–17	National League	34	0	0	0	—		2 (Note: Appearances in the FA Trophy)	0	36	0
Guiseley	2017–18	National League	14	0	2	0	—		0	0	16	0
Guiseley	Total		48	0	2	0	0	0	2	0	52	0
Stockport County	2018–19	National League North	40	2	5	0	—		7	0	52	2
Stockport County	2019–20	National League	37	5	1	0	—		3	1	41	6
Stockport County	2020–21	National League	33	4	4	1	—		3 (Note: Two appearances and one goal in FA Trophy and one appearance in National League play-offs)	1	40	6
Stockport County	2021–22	National League	40	3	4	1	—		2	1	46	5
Stockport County	2022–23	League Two	3	0	0	0	1	0	2	0	6	0
Stockport County	Total		153	14	14	2	1	0	17	3	185	19
Chesterfield	2022–23	National League	21	1	1	0	—		2 (Note: Appearances in National League play-offs)	0	24	1
Chesterfield	2023–24	National League	29	3	4	1	—		0	0	33	4
Chesterfield	2024–25	League Two	15	2	0	0	0	0	2 (Note: Appearances in EFL League Two play-offs)	0	17	2
Chesterfield	Total		65	6	5	1	0	0	4	0	74	7
Career total			332	22	23	3	1	0	24	3	380	28

== Honours ==
Stockport County

- National League: 2021–22

Chesterfield

- National League: 2023–24

Individual

- National League Team of the Season: 2021–22
