= Charlie McArthur =

Scottish footballer (born 2005)

Personal information
- Full name: Charlie Walter McArthur
- Date of birth: 12 May 2005 (age 21)
- Height: 6 ft 2 in (1.88 m)
- Position: Defender

Team information
- Current team: Woking (on loan from York City)
- Number: 12

Youth career
- Kilmarnock

Senior career*
Years	Team	Apps	(Gls)
2021–2022	Kilmarnock	1	(0)
2022–2026	Newcastle United	0	(0)
2025	→ Carlisle United (loan)	10	(0)
2026	→ Airdrieonians (loan)	13	(2)
2026–	York City	1	(0)
2026–	→ Woking (loan)	3	(0)

International career^{‡}
2021–2022	Scotland U17	9	(0)
2023–	Scotland U19	9	(0)
2025–	Scotland U21	1	(0)
- * Club domestic league appearances and goals as of 20:07, 22 November 2026 (UTC) ‡ National team caps and goals as of 14:19, 22 March 2025 (UTC)

Charlie Walter McArthur (born 12 May 2005) is a Scottish professional footballer who plays as a defender for National League club Woking on loan from York City.

== Club career ==
McArthur began his career with Kilmarnock, turning professional in July 2021, and making his first-team debut at the age of 16 in October 2021. He signed for Newcastle United in July 2022, although he suffered from injuries in the 2022–23 season.

He moved on loan to Carlisle United in January 2025, becoming the eighth player to be signed by Carlisle in the January transfer window. In January 2026 he signed on loan for Airdrieonians.

Following the expiry of his contract with Newcastle, McArthur signed for newly promoted League Two club York City on 1 July 2026. On 27 October 2026, McArthur joined National League club Woking on a one-month loan deal.

== International career ==
McArthur is a Scotland youth international. He was captain of the under-17 team, including at the 2022 UEFA European Under-17 Championship, and made his under-21 debut in March 2025.
