= Alfie McNally =

English footballer (born 2004)

- Alfie McNally (2025)

Personal information
- Full name: Alfie Shane McNally
- Date of birth: 22 December 2004 (age 21)
- Place of birth: Hillingdon, England
- Height: 1.91 m (6 ft 3 in)
- Position: Goalkeeper

Team information
- Current team: York City (on loan from Fulham)
- Number: 1

Youth career
- –2016: Brentford
- 2016–2026: Fulham

Senior career*
Years	Team	Apps	(Gls)
2026–	Fulham	0	(0)
2026–	→ York City (loan)	6	(0)
- * Club domestic league appearances and goals as of 12 September 2026 (UTC)

Alfie Shane McNally (born 22 December 2004) is an English professional footballer who plays for as a goalkeeper for EFL League Two club York City, on loan from Premier League club Fulham.

== Career ==
=== Fulham ===
McNally started his career with Brentford, before joining the academy of Fulham in 2016. On 18 October 2022, he signed his first professional contract with Fulham. On 13 November 2025, he signed a new contract with the club until 2028.

On 20 July 2026, McNally joined League Two side York City on a season-long loan. He made his debut for the club on 3 August 2026, in a 2–0 defeat to Crawley Town in the EFL Cup.

== Career statistics ==
As of match played 15 August 2026

Appearances and goals by club, season and competition
Club	Season	League			FA Cup		EFL Cup		Other		Total	
Club	Season	Division	Apps	Goals	Apps	Goals	Apps	Goals	Apps	Goals	Apps	Goals
Fulham U21	2024–25	—			—		—		1 (Note: Appearances in EFL Trophy)	0	1	0
Fulham U21	2025–26	—			—		—		3	0	3	0
Fulham U21	Total		0	0	0	0	0	0	4	0	4	0
Fulham	2026–27	Premier League	0	0	0	0	0	0	―		0	0
York City (loan)	2026–27	League Two	1	0	0	0	1	0	0	0	2	0
Career total			1	0	0	0	1	0	4	0	6	0
