= Ryan Fallowfield =

English footballer (born 1996)

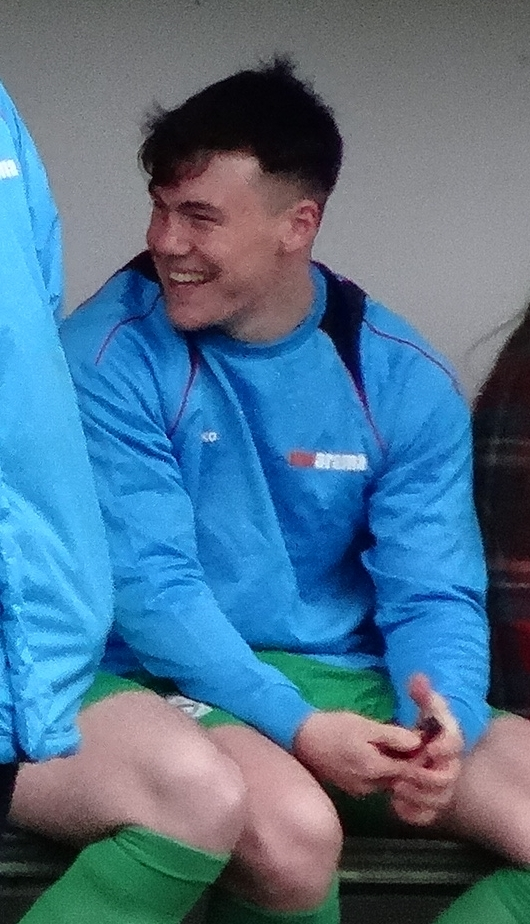
- Fallowfield with North Ferriby United in 2017

Personal information
- Full name: Ryan Jack Glenn Fallowfield
- Date of birth: 3 January 1996 (age 30)
- Place of birth: Kingston upon Hull, England
- Height: 5 ft 9 in (1.74 m)
- Position: Right-back

Team information
- Current team: York City
- Number: 2

Youth career
- –2014: Hull City

Senior career*
Years	Team	Apps	(Gls)
2014–2015	Hull City	0	(0)
2014–2015	→ Harrogate Town (loan)	13	(1)
2015–2016	Harrogate Town	9	(0)
2016–2017	North Ferriby United	28	(0)
2017–2022	Harrogate Town	140	(2)
2022–	York City	137	(9)
- * Club domestic league appearances and goals as of 12 September 2026 (UTC)

Ryan Jack Glenn Fallowfield (born 3 January 1996) is an English professional footballer who plays as a right-back for EFL League Two club York City. Fallowfield started his career at Hull City, though did not make a senior appearance, and has also played for North Ferriby United.

== Career ==
Fallowfield was born in Kingston upon Hull, East Riding of Yorkshire. He joined the academy of Hull City at the age of nine. Fallowfield, who attended Goole High School, signed his first professional contract with the club at the age of 16.

In December 2014, Fallowfield joined Harrogate Town on a one-month loan, which was later extended to three months. In March 2015, Fallowfield left Hull City by mutual consent following his return from his loan at Harrogate Town and subsequently joined Harrogate Town on a permanent basis. He left the club in summer 2016 having suffered from a broken foot during the 2015–16 season, and had a trial at North Ferriby United before joining them on a permanent basis.

In the summer of 2017, Fallowfield returned to Harrogate Town, signing a two-year contract with the club. He was part of the Harrogate team that won promotion to the National League for the first time in the club's history after defeating Brackley Town in the 2018 National League North play-off final.

Fallowfield signed a new contract with Harrogate in the summer of 2020 following their promotion to the Football League for the first time in their history.

Following his release from Harrogate at the end of the 2021–22 season, Fallowfield signed for newly promoted National League club York City in June 2022. In April 2024 he was awarded the York City Clubman of the Year award.

== Style of play ==
He plays as a right-back.

== Career statistics ==
As of match played on 28 March 2023

Appearances and goals by club, season and competition
Club	Season	League			FA Cup		EFL Cup		Other		Total	
Club	Season	Division	Apps	Goals	Apps	Goals	Apps	Goals	Apps	Goals	Apps	Goals
Hull City	2014–15	Premier League	0	0	0	0	0	0	0	0	0	0
Harrogate Town (loan)	2014–15	Conference North	21	1	0	0	—		0	0	21	1
Harrogate Town	2015–16	National League North	1	0	0	0	—		0	0	1	0
North Ferriby United	2016–17	National League	28	0	1	0	—		0	0	29	0
Harrogate Town	2017–18	National League North	29	0	1	0	—		5 (Note: Three appearances in FA Trophy, two in National League North play-offs)	0	35	0
Harrogate Town	2018–19	National League	26	0	1	0	—		3 (Note: Appearances in FA Trophy)	0	30	0
Harrogate Town	2019–20	National League	26	2	2	0	—		7 (Note: Five appearances in FA Trophy, two in National League play-offs)	0	35	2
Harrogate Town	2020–21	League Two	31	0	0	0	2	0	1 (Note: Appearance in EFL Trophy)	0	34	0
Harrogate Town	2021–22	League Two	28	0	2	0	0	0	4	0	34	0
Harrogate Town	Total		140	2	6	0	2	0	20	0	168	2
York City	2022-23	National League	34	2	1	0	—		0	0	35	2
Career total			224	5	8	0	2	0	20	0	254	5

== Honours ==
Harrogate Town

- National League North play-offs: 2018
- National League play-offs: 2020
- FA Trophy: 2019–20

York City

- National League: 2025–26
