= Rochdale A.F.C. 1–1 York City F.C. (2026) =

English football match

Rochdale 1–1 York City
- Event: 2025–26 National League
| Rochdale | York City |
| 1 | 1 |
- Date: 25 April 2026
- Venue: Spotland Stadium, Rochdale
- Referee: Will Finnie
- Attendance: 7,221
- Weather: Sunny

On the final matchday of the 2025–26 National League season, Rochdale and York City faced each other to decide both the league winner and who would automatically be promoted to the 2026–27 EFL League Two. This match marked the first time since Arsenal defeated Liverpool in May 1989 where a league title was decided by a single match between the top two teams of England's top five leagues.

Rochdale took the lead in the 95th minute, thanks to a goal from Emmanuel Dieseruvwe. However, after the resumption of the match following a pitch invasion, York City's Josh Stones scored in the 103rd minute to equalise. The 1–1 draw secured York City the National League title and a return to the English Football League for the first time in 10 years. This also marked York City's first league title since they won the Football League Fourth Division in the 1983–84 season. Rochdale were later promoted to League Two, after winning the National League play-off final against Boreham Wood.

The game was streamed on DAZN worldwide, with team-specific commentary available on BBC Radio Manchester and BBC Radio York.

== Background ==
League position going into the final game of the season
| Pos | Team | Pld | W | D | L | F | A | GD | Pts |
|---|---|---|---|---|---|---|---|---|---|
| 1 | York City | 45 | 33 | 8 | 4 | 113 | 40 | +73 | 107 |
| 2 | Rochdale | 45 | 33 | 6 | 6 | 87 | 40 | +47 | 105 |

Going into the match, both teams were separated by only two points, with York City on 107 points and Rochdale on 105 points, meaning that Rochdale needed a win to get promoted, otherwise York City would be promoted instead. The last time two teams in the National League achieved over 100 points was during the 2022–23 season, when Wrexham and Notts County got 111 and 107 points respectively. This was also the first time a single league match between the top two teams was a title-decider in England since Arsenal faced Liverpool on the final matchday of the 1988–89 Football League First Division.

Prior to this match, Rochdale and York City had already faced each other twice during the 2025–26 season. The first time came during the FA Cup fourth qualifying round on 11 October 2025, which York City won 2–1, while the second came in the teams' previous league fixture on 11 November 2025, which York City won 4–1.

York City nearly won the league title during the previous matchday, following a 3–0 win at home against Yeovil Town, but Rochdale forward Emmanuel Dieseruvwe managed to score a 99th-minute injury time winner in a 2–1 win against Braintree Town to keep them in the title race.

Before the match, York City manager Stuart Maynard called the match "one of the biggest games in the English football pyramid." Additionally, both clubs released a statement the day before the match, confirming their joint support for the idea of adding a third promoted team between the National League and the EFL League Two.

== Match ==
A total of 7,221 fans were in attendance for the match at the Spotland Stadium, with another 4,500 fans watching it from the screen at the LNER Community Stadium in York.

During the first half of the match, Dan Moss scored from a Tobi Adebayo-Rowling cross for Rochdale, but it was ruled out because of a foul on York City goalkeeper Harrison Male. York City later got a free kick, which Alex Hunt lofted in to Ollie Pearce, but was saved by Manchester City loanee Ollie Whatmuff. Whatmuff later denied Josh Stones a one-on-one opportunity shortly after half-time, as well as saving a goal from Joe Grey near the end of the match.

Rochdale took the lead in the 95th minute, when a cross by substitute Ian Henderson was headed in by Emmanuel Dieseruvwe, with Rochdale fans invading the pitch to celebrate the goal, thinking they had won. It took six minutes for the match to resume, but in the 103rd minute of the match, York City's Josh Stones scored the equalising goal with almost the last kick of the match. Despite the controversy of some believing the goal didn't cross the line, the linesman clearly saw that the ball did fully cross the line, and gave the signal to the referee, who awarded the goal, triggering another pitch invasion, this time by York City fans.

=== Details ===
25 April 2026
12:30 BST

| Rochdale | 1–1 | York City |
|---|---|---|
| Dieseruvwe 90+5' | Report | Stones 90+13' |

Spotland Stadium, Rochdale
Attendance: 7,221
Referee: Will Finnie

| GK | 1 | (England) Oliver Whatmuff |
| CB | 2 | (England) Kyron Gordon |
| CB | 6 | (England) Ethan Ebanks-Landell (c) |
| CB | 25 | (England) Callum Perry |
| RWB | 14 | (England) Tobi Adebayo-Rowling | | (substituted off) 76' |
| DM | 4 | (England) Ryan East | (yellow card) 35' | (substituted off) 67' |
| DM | 8 | (England) Harvey Gilmour | (yellow card) 59' | (substituted off) 84' |
| LWB | 22 | (England) Dan Moss |
| AM | 10 | (England) Devante Rodney | | (substituted off) 67' |
| AM | 12 | (England) Luke Hannant | | (substituted off) 67' |
| CF | 9 | (England) Emmanuel Dieseruvwe | (yellow card) 90+6' |
Substitutes:
| DF | 35 | (England) Archie Baptiste |
| MF | 36 | (England) Edward Francis |
| MF | 16 | (England) Casey Pettit | | (substituted on) 67' |
| MF | 17 | (England) Joe Pritchard | (yellow card) 90+2' | (substituted on) 76' |
| MF | 18 | (England) Aidan Barlow | | (substituted on) 67' |
| FW | 38 | (England) Tyler Smith | (yellow card) 90+6' | (substituted on) 84' |
| FW | 40 | (England) Ian Henderson | | (substituted on) 67' |
Manager:
(England) Jimmy McNulty

| GK | 1 | (England) Harrison Male |
| CB | 4 | (England) Malachi Fagan-Walcott |
| CB | 29 | (England) Zak Johnson |
| CB | 3 | (England) Mark Kitching |
| RWB | 15 | (England) Jeff King | | (substituted off) 69' |
| CM | 8 | (England) Alex Hunt | | (substituted off) 69' |
| CM | 21 | (England) Hiram Boateng |
| LWB | 14 | (England) Ben Brookes | | (substituted off) 75' |
| AM | 28 | (England) Ollie Banks | (yellow card) 23' | (substituted off) 69' |
| AM | 10 | (England) Ollie Pearce (c) | | (substituted off) 88' |
| CF | 9 | (England) Josh Stones | (yellow card) 90+13' |
Substitutes:
| GK | 31 | (England) George Sykes-Kenworthy |
| DF | 5 | (England) Callum Howe | | (substituted on) 75' |
| DF | 2 | (England) Ryan Fallowfield | | (substituted on) 69' |
| MF | 18 | (England) Dan Batty | | (substituted on) 69' |
| MF | 22 | (England) Greg Olley | | (substituted on) 88' |
| FW | 12 | (England) Joe Grey | | (substituted on) 69' |
| FW | 30 | (England) Alex Newby |
Manager:
(England) Stuart Maynard

Assistant referees:
Daniel Woodward
Jacob Lehane
Fourth official:
Kavan Hurn

== Aftermath ==
League position immediately after the match
| Pos | Team | Pld | W | D | L | GF | GA | GD | Pts |
|---|---|---|---|---|---|---|---|---|---|
| 1 | York City (C, P) | 46 | 33 | 9 | 4 | 114 | 41 | +73 | 108 |
| 2 | Rochdale (Q) | 46 | 33 | 7 | 6 | 88 | 41 | +47 | 106 |

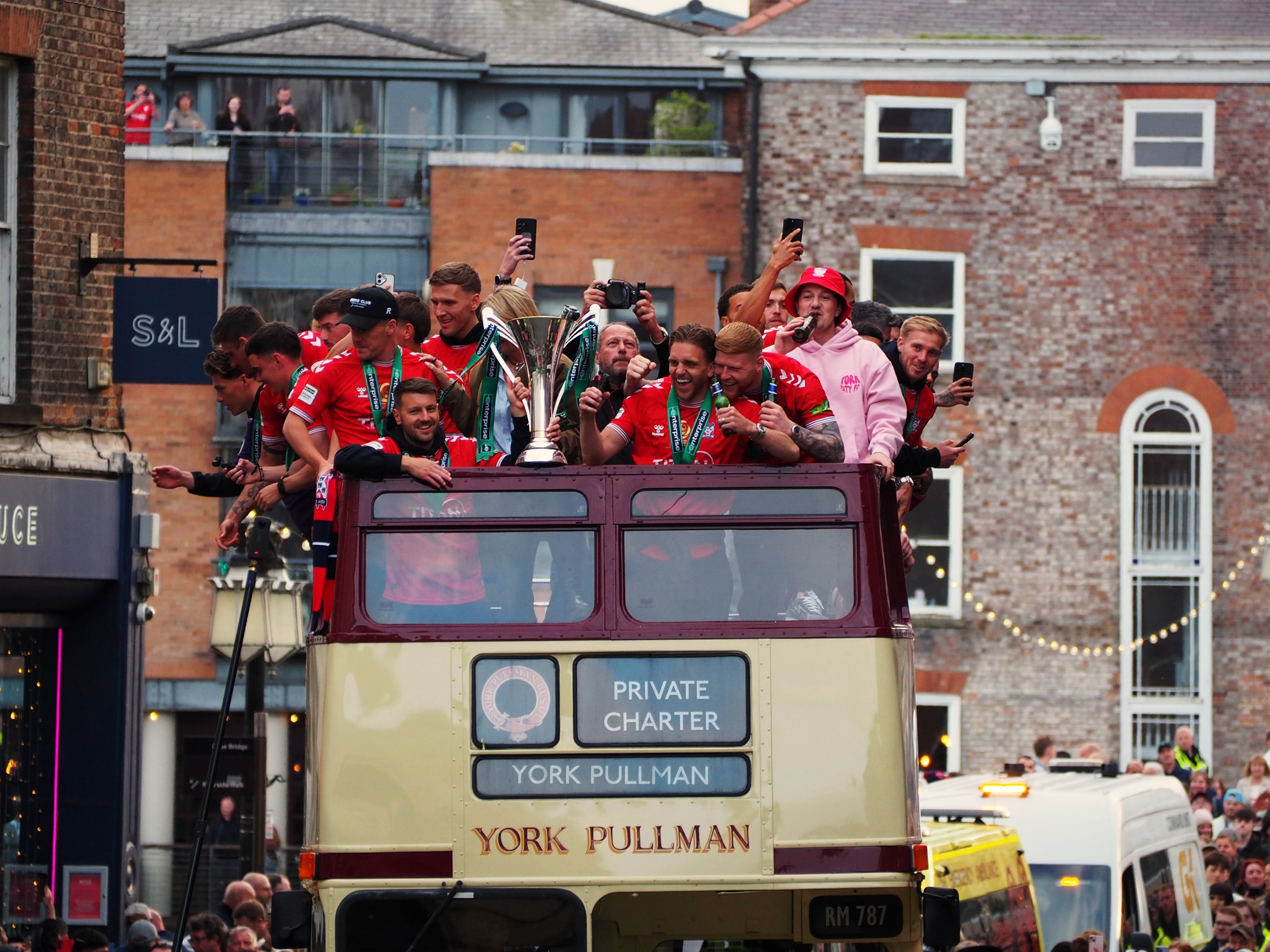
York City celebrating their National League title with an open-top bus parade on 7 May.

The draw secured York City the league title, as well as promotion to the 2026–27 EFL League Two, marking their return to the English Football League for the first time in 10 years. Following the match, several members of York City, including Josh Stones and manager Stuart Maynard, admitted they hoped Rochdale got promoted via the National League play-offs, with Maynard claiming it was "scandalous" that a team in the National League could get over 100 points and not be promoted.

Five people were arrested by Greater Manchester Police following the match, four Rochdale fans and a York City fan, on various charges. Additionally, Josh Stones claimed to have been abused by Rochdale fans during the first pitch invasion. The day after the match, Greater Manchester Police confirmed they were looking into footage of an incident during one of the pitch invasions, where midfielder Hiram Boateng punched a fan. Three days later, York City released a statement saying they were supporting Boateng 'through all proceedings' following the incident.

=== National League play-offs ===
In the promotion play-off semi-finals, Rochdale were drawn against Scunthorpe United, who had beaten Southend United in the quarter-finals. Rochdale won 2–1 at Spotland, thanks to both a goal from Devante Rodney and an own goal by Scunthorpe United defender Will Evans, to qualify for the play-off final against Boreham Wood at Wembley Stadium on 10 May. In the final, Rochdale went 2–0 down by the 69th minute, before Tyler Smith brought it to 2–1 in the 78th minute, and Emmanuel Dieseruvwe scored a 90+7th minute equalizer to take the match into extra time. Rochdale went on to win 3–1 in a penalty shootout, to secure promotion to the 2026–27 EFL League Two, after three seasons in the National League.
