= 2025–26 York City F.C. season =

English football club season

York City F.C.
2025–26 season
- Chairman: Julie-Anne & Matt Uggla
- Manager: Adam Hinshelwood (until 28 August); Stuart Maynard
- Stadium: LNER Community Stadium
- National League: 1st (promoted)
- FA Cup: First round
- FA Trophy: Third round
- Top goalscorer: League: Ollie Pearce (34); All: Ollie Pearce (35)
- Highest home attendance: 8,219 vs Yeovil Town (18 April 2026, National League)
- Lowest home attendance: 4,952 vs Gateshead (5 November 2025, National League)
- Average home league attendance: 6,650

The 2025–26 York City F.C. season was York City's 104th season in existence, and the club's 4th season back in the National League after promotion from the National League North. The club competed in the National League, the FA Cup and the FA Trophy. On 28 August 2025, just 4 games into the new season, the club announced that Adam Hinshelwood would leave the club with immediate effect, with former Notts County manager Stuart Maynard announced as his successor on the same day.

On 25 April 2026, York City were promoted to League Two after a dramatic 1–1 draw against second place Rochdale A.F.C. A draw would have seen York win promotion, but Rochdale scored through Emmanuel Dieseruvwe in the 95th minute of the match. However, Josh Stones scored for York in the 103rd minute to send York into League Two.

York's points total of 108 was a new club record in a 'three points per win' season, with their 114 goals scored also a club record for goals scored in a season.

== Pre-season and friendlies ==
The club announced that 24 of the players contracted for the previous season would remain at the club, with 8 players leaving upon the expiration of their contract. 2 players who had been on loan at the club also returned to their parent clubs.

The club signed their first player in pre season just nine days after their 0–3 Vanarama National League Play-Off Semi-Final defeat to Oldham, recruiting experienced midfielder Ollie Banks on 30 May 2025. This marked the start of a number of transfer dealings, with Dipo Akenyemi joining Derry City on a permanent deal, and 5 players leaving on loan. Manager Adam Hinshelwood added further depth to the squad with the signings of Joe Grey from Hartlepool, and Greg Olley from Gateshead. York made several more signings before the end of the transfer window.

Long-serving player Paddy McLaughlin was granted a testimonial year "in recognition of his outstanding service to the club."

York City confirmed six pre-season friendlies against Garforth Town, Salford City, Sheffield United, Barnsley, Marine, and Spennymoor Town. The fixture against Salford City was, however, abandoned, due to allegations of racist abuse towards a Salford player. Police originally arrested a 23-year-old man from York, but he was later released as "no evidence of a hate crime" was found.

Win Draw Loss Fixtures

8 July 2025 Friendly	Garforth Town	1–0	York City	Garforth
19:30 BST	Marshall 69'	Report		Stadium: Bannister Prentice Stadium; Attendance: 1,142

11 July 2025 Friendly	York City	Abandoned	Salford City	York
19:00 BST	Pearce 4', 22'; Fadera 76'	Report	Wright 35'; Edwards 70'; Austerfield 74'	Stadium: LNER Community Stadium; Attendance: 1,320

15 July 2025 Friendly	York City	2–6	Sheffield United	York
19:00 BST	Hunt 65'; Fallowfield 67'	Report	Ahmedhodžić 20'; Brooks 22'; Campbell 41'; Oné 49', 83'; Moore 73'	Stadium: LNER Community Stadium; Attendance: 3,410

22 July 2025 Friendly	York City	2–2	Barnsley	York
19:00 BST	Banks 6'; Pearce 70'	Report	Vickers 55'; Phillips 75'	Stadium: LNER Community Stadium; Attendance: 2,567

26 July 2025 Friendly	Marine	0–1	York City	Liverpool
13:00 BST		Report	Nathaniel-George 26'	Stadium: Rossett Park; Attendance: 550

2 August 2025 Friendly	Spennymoor	0–1	York City	Spennymoor
15:00 BST		Report	Trialist 57'	Stadium: Brewery Field; Attendance: 596

== Competitions ==
York City competed in the National League in the 2025–26 season, as well as in two cup competitions, joining the FA Cup in the fourth qualifying round and the FA Trophy in the third round.

=== National League ===
==== League table ====
Pos	Team	Pld	W	D	L	GF	GA	GD	Pts	Promotion, qualification or relegation
1	York City (C, P)	46	33	9	4	114	41	+73	108	Promotion to EFL League Two
2	Rochdale (O, P)	46	33	7	6	88	41	+47	106	Qualification for National League play-off semi-finals
3	Carlisle United	46	29	8	9	87	51	+36	95	Qualification for National League play-off semi-finals
4	Boreham Wood	46	27	9	10	95	58	+37	90	Qualification for the National League play-off quarter-finals
5	Scunthorpe United	46	23	13	10	77	62	+15	82	Qualification for the National League play-off quarter-finals

Source: National League official site
Rules for classification: 1) Points; 2) Goal difference; 3) Number of goals scored; 4) Number of matches won; 5) Head-to-head results
(C) Champions; (O) Play-off winners; (P) Promoted

==== Results summary ====
Overall								Home						Away					
Pld	W	D	L	GF	GA	GD	Pts	W	D	L	GF	GA	GD	W	D	L	GF	GA	GD
46	33	9	4	114	41	+73	108	17	4	2	69	21	+48	16	5	2	45	20	+25

Last updated: 20 April 2026.

==== Matches ====
York's fixtures were announced on 9 July 2025.

9 August 2025 1	York City	2–2	Sutton United	York
15:00 BST	Pearce 11'; Pruti 58' (o.g.)	Report	Ogbonna 38'; Njoku 87'	Stadium: LNER Community Stadium; Attendance: 5,937; Referee: Andrew Miller

16 August 2025 2	Truro City	0–2	York City	Truro
17:30 BST		Report	Kitching 83'; Stones 88'	Stadium: Truro Sports Hub; Attendance: 3,065; Referee: Robert Massey-Ellis

20 August 2025 3	Southend United	0–0	York City	Southend-on-Sea
19:45 BST		Report		Stadium: Roots Hall; Attendance: 8,735; Referee: Jacob Miles

25 August 2025 4	Woking	1–1	York City	Woking
15:00 BST	Drewe 21'	Report	Newby 53'	Stadium: Laithwaite Community Stadium; Attendance: 3,198; Referee: Sunny Singh Gill

6 September 2025 5	Yeovil Town	1–3	York City	Yeovil
15:00 BST	McCormick 77'	Report	Pearce 25' (pen.); Banks 34'; Wannell 83' (og.)	Stadium: Huish Park; Attendance: 2,954; Referee: Lewis Sandoe

9 September 2025 6	York City	4–0	Tamworth	York
19:45 BST	Hunt 48', 86'; Newby 59'; Fagan-Walcott 90'	Report		Stadium: LNER Community Stadium; Attendance: 5,431; Referee: Dean Watson

16 September 2025 7	Braintree Town	2–3	York City	Braintree
15:00 BST	Works 4', 47'	Report	Hunt 54'; Grey 77'; Pearce 90+3' (pen.)	Stadium: Rare Breed Meat Co. Stadium; Attendance: 1,409; Referee: Harrison Blair

20 September 2025 8	York City	0–1	Solihull Moors	York
15:00 BST		Report	Wakeling 90+5'	Stadium: LNER Community Stadium; Attendance: 5,715; Referee: Aaron Bannister

23 September 2025 9	York City	5–0	Carlisle United	York
19:45 BST	Fagan-Walcott 4'; Pearce 39' (pen.), 44'; Newby 49'; Stones 86'	Report		Stadium: LNER Community Stadium; Attendance: 7,272; Referee: Zac Kennard-Kettle

23 September 2025 10	Forest Green	1–1	York City	Nailsworth
17:30 BST	Mitchell 5'	Report	Pearce 14' (pen.)	Stadium: The Bolt New Lawn; Attendance: 2,215; Referee: Martin Woods

1 October 2025 11	York City	1–3	Scunthorpe United	York
19:45 BST	Pearce 90+5'	Report	Beestin 45+3'; Ewing 83' (pen.); Sellars-Fleming 90+9'	Stadium: LNER Community Stadium; Attendance: 7,316; Referee: Seb Stockbridge

4 October 2025 12	Hartlepool United	1–2	York City	Hartlepool
12:30 BST	Oliver 88'	Report	Newby 25'; Brookes 86'	Stadium: The Prestige Group Stadium; Attendance: 4,428; Referee: Dale Baines

18 October 2025 13	York City	4–0	Wealdstone	York
15:00 BST	Fagan-Walcott 18'; Pearce 26', 60'; Newby 75'	Report		Stadium: LNER Community Stadium; Attendance: 6,026; Referee: Callum Walchester

21 October 2025 14	York City	2–2	Boreham Wood	York
19:45 BST	Newby 45+5'; Fallowfield 89'	Report	Rush 2', 66'	Stadium: LNER Community Stadium; Attendance: 5,193; Referee: Declan Brown

25 October 2025 15	FC Halifax Town	1–1	York City	Halifax
12:30 BST	Harris 3'	Report	Pearce 85'	Stadium: The Shay; Attendance: 3,708; Referee: Richard Aspinall

5 November 2025 16	York City	4–0	Gateshead	York
19:45 BST	Stones 11'; Felix 17'; Hunt 29'; Pearce 90+2'	Report		Stadium: LNER Community Stadium; Attendance: 4,952; Referee: James Bancroft

8 November 2025 17	Eastleigh	2–4	York City	Eastleigh
15:00 BST	Skinner 35', 43'	Report	Pearce 25', 70'; Hewitt 79'; Stones 82'	Stadium: Silverlake Stadium; Attendance: 2,524; Referee: Harry Wager

11 November 2025 18	York City	4–1	Rochdale	York
19:45 BST	Pearce 35', 59'; Stones 46', 49'	Report	Adebayo-Rowling 39'	Stadium: LNER Community Stadium; Attendance: 6,643; Referee: Martin Woods

15 November 2025 19	York City	4–2	Morecambe	York
15:03 BST	Fagan-Walcott 41'; Banks 60'; Hunt 66'; Fallowfield 90+6'	Report	Azeez 23' (pen.); Tollitt 49'	Stadium: LNER Community Stadium; Attendance: 6,820; Referee: Steven Copeland

22 November 2025 20	Brackley Town	2–3	York City	Brackley
15:00 BST	Roberts 26'; Nottingham 36'	Report	Olley 16'; Stones 41'; Pearce 76'	Stadium: St James Park; Attendance: 1,144; Referee: Wayne Cartmel

29 November 2025 21	York City	5–1	Aldershot Town	York
15:00 BST	Olley 4'; Malachi Fagan-Walcott 47'; Grey 64', 75', 89' (pen.)	Report	Jones 13'	Stadium: LNER Community Stadium; Attendance: 6,454; Referee: Robert Massey-Ellis

20 December 2025 22	York City	4–0	Truro City	York
17:30 BST	Pearce 5', 36', 45+5'; Newby 82'	Report		Stadium: LNER Community Stadium; Attendance: 6,575; Referee: Andrew Miller

26 December 2025 23	York City	2–2	Boston United	York
16:00 BST	Pearce 38'; Banks (red card) 63'; Stones 90+6'	Report	Lankshear 73'; Teale 86'	Stadium: LNER Community Stadium; Attendance: 7,935; Referee: Gareth Thomas

30 December 2025 24	Altrincham	1–2	York City	Altrincham
19:45 BST	Weaver 90'	Report	Newby 42'; Pearce 90+1'	Stadium: J. Davidson Stadium; Attendance: 2,733; Referee: Melissa Burgin

10 January 2026 25	Sutton United	1–2	York City	Sutton
15:00 BST	Tizzard 8'	Report	Boateng 25'; Pearce 48'	Stadium: VBS Community Stadium; Attendance: 2,414; Referee: Aaron Jackson

17 January 2026 26	York City	1–1	Southend United	York
17:30 BST	Pearce 87'	Report	Cardwell 31'	Stadium: LNER Community Stadium; Attendance: 7,114; Referee: Oliver Mackey

21 January 2026 27	Carlisle United	0–3	York City	Carlisle
19:45 BST		Report	Stones 6'; Hunt 75' (pen.); Newby 90+8'	Stadium: Brunton Park; Attendance: 7,238; Referee: Scott Jackson

24 January 2026 28	York City	5–0	Braintree Town	York
15:00 BST	Pearce 5', 22', 61'; Olley 18'; Boateng 28'	Report		Stadium: LNER Community Stadium; Attendance: 6,477; Referee: Dale Baines

31 January 2026 29	Solihull Moors	0–2	York City	Solihull
15:00 BST		Report	Hunt 60' (pen.); Newby 79'	Stadium: Damson Park; Attendance: 1,759; Referee: Sam Mulhall

7 February 2026 30	York City	2–1	Forest Green	York
15:00 BST	Hunt 16' (pen.); Pearce 45+3'	Report	McAllister 65'	Stadium: LNER Community Stadium; Attendance: 6,686; Referee: Martin Coy

11 February 2026 31	York City	3–2	Hartlepool United	York
19:45 BST	Newby 19'; Boateng 84'; Stones 90+13' (pen.)	Report	McNally 39'; Caton 90+7'	Stadium: LNER Community Stadium; Attendance: 6,511; Referee: Declan Brown

14 February 2026 32	Wealdstone	0–3	York City	Ruislip
15:00 BST	Boldewijn (red card) 56'	Report	Williams 70'; Johnson 80'; Batty 90+6'	Stadium: Grosvenor Vale; Attendance: 1,984; Referee: Declan Bourne

21 February 2026 33	York City	4–1	FC Halifax Town	York
15:00 BST	Stones 18'; Hunt 25'; Pearce 40'; Banks 58'	Report	Hmami 56'	Stadium: LNER Community Stadium; Attendance: 7,714; Referee: Alan Dale

24 February 2026 34	Scunthorpe United	0–3	York City	Scunthorpe
19:45 BST		Report	Stones 14', 71'; Grey 29'	Stadium: Attis Arena; Attendance: 6,383; Referee: Zac Kennard-Kettle

28 February 2026 35	Morecambe	0–1	York City	Morecambe
17:30 BST		Report	Banks 90+9'	Stadium: Mazuma Mobile Stadium; Attendance: 3,726; Referee: Aaron Bannister

3 March 2026 36	Boreham Wood	3–2	York City	Borehamwood
19:45 BST	Richardson 48'; Coxe 78'; O'Connell 87'	Report	Pearce 6'; Stones (yellow card) 45+2' (yellow-red card) 61'; Banks 90+2'	Stadium: Meadow Park; Attendance: 1,801; Referee: Lewis Sandoe

7 March 2026 37	York City	3–1	Eastleigh	York
15:00 BST	Kitching 28'; Fagan-Walcott 37', 58'	Report	Blair 18'	Stadium: LNER Community Stadium; Attendance: 6,277; Referee: Michael Barlow

14 March 2026 38	Aldershot Town	0–3	York City	Aldershot
15:00 BST		Report	Banks 24'; Newby 59'; Stones 83'	Stadium: EBB Stadium; Attendance: 2,728; Referee: Aaron Farmer

21 March 2026 39	York City	4–0	Brackley Town	York
15:00 BST	Stones 18', 45+3'; Olley 71'; Pearce 90+3'	Report		Stadium: LNER Community Stadium; Attendance: 6,540; Referee: Niall Smith

24 March 2026 40	Gateshead	3–1	York City	Gateshead
19:45 BST	Ward 41'; Boatswain 65'; Storey 85'	Report	Pearce 90+3'	Stadium: Gateshead International Stadium; Attendance: 3,014; Referee: Steven Copeland

28 March 2026 41	York City	1–0	Woking	York
15:00 BST	Pearce 74' (pen.)	Report		Stadium: LNER Community Stadium; Attendance: 6,970; Referee: Paul Marsden

3 April 2026 42	Boston United	0–1	York City	Boston
15:00 BST		Report	Brookes 48'	Stadium: Jakemans Community Stadium; Attendance: 3,198; Referee: Andrew Miller

6 April 2026 43	York City	2–1	Altrincham	York
15:00 BST	Banks 38'; Fagan-Walcott 90+6'	Report	Knowles 36'	Stadium: LNER Community Stadium; Attendance: 8,162; Referee: William Davis

11 April 2026 44	Tamworth	0–1	York City	Tamworth
15:00 BST		Report	Pearce 27'	Stadium: The Lamb Ground; Attendance: 1,706; Referee: Jamie O'Connor

18 April 2026 45	York City	3–0	Yeovil Town	York
17:30 BST	Pearce 23'; Stones 42'; Grey 90+2'	Report		Stadium: LNER Community Stadium; Attendance: 8,219; Referee: Darren Drysdale

25 April 2026 46	Rochdale	1–1	York City	Rochdale
12:30 BST	Dieseruvwe 90+5'	Report	Stones 90+13'	Stadium: Crown Oil Arena; Attendance: 7,221; Referee: William Finnie

=== FA Cup ===
York entered the FA Cup in the fourth qualifying round. Fixtures took place on the weekend of 11 October 2025, with the draw being made following the conclusion of the third qualifying round on 30 September 2025.

11 October 2025 Fourth qualifying round	Rochdale	1–2	York City	Rochdale
	Dieseruvwe 71'	Report	Newby 56', 88'	Stadium: Crown Oil Arena; Attendance: 2,981; Referee: Declan Bourne

First round	Barnsley	3–2	York City	Barnsley
	Keillor-Dunn 30', 77'; Roberts 90+1'	Report	Stones 23'; Kitching 87'	Stadium: Oakwell; Attendance: 5,935; Referee: Michael Barlow

=== FA Trophy ===
York entered the FA Trophy in the third round. Fixtures took place on the weekend of 13 December 2024.

13 December 2025 Third round	Clitheroe	1–1 (4–3 p)	York City	Clitheroe
	Creech 89'	Report	Pearce 90+8'	Stadium: Loom Loft Stadium; Attendance: 2,071; Referee: Richard Aspinall

== Squad statistics ==
As of match played 25 April 2026

No.	Pos.	Nat.	Name	League		FA Cup		FA Trophy		Total		Discipline	
No.	Pos.	Nat.	Name	Apps	Goals	Apps	Goals	Apps	Goals	Apps	Goals	Yellow card	Red card
1	GK	ENG	Harrison Male	46	0	2	0	0	0	48	0	3	0
2	DF	ENG	Ryan Fallowfield	4+18	2	1	0	0+1	0	5+19	2	3	0
3	DF	ENG	Mark Kitching	44	2	2	1	0+1	0	46+1	3	7	0
4	DF	ENG	Malachi Fagan-Walcott	33+4	8	2	0	0	0	35+4	8	2	0
5	DF	ENG	Callum Howe	19+8	1	1	0	1	0	21+8	1	1	0
8	MF	ENG	Alex Hunt	44+1	9	1+1	0	1	0	46+2	9	7	0
9	FW	ENG	Josh Stones	27+11	18	1+1	1	1	0	28+12	19	11	1
10	FW	ENG	Ollie Pearce	44+1	34	2	0	0+1	1	46+2	35	4	0
12	FW	ENG	Joe Grey	21+18	6	2	0	1	0	24+18	6	4	0
14	MF	ENG	Ben Brookes	17+17	2	0+2	0	1	0	18+19	2	5	0
15	DF	ENG	Jeff King	19+3	0	0	0	0	0	19+3	0	3	0
17	FW	ENG	Craig Hewitt	0+6	1	0	0	1	0	1+6	1	0	0
18	MF	ENG	Daniel Batty	13+23	1	1+1	0	1	0	15+24	1	3	0
21	MF	ENG	Hiram Boateng	39+4	3	2	0	0	0	41+4	3	9	0
22	MF	ENG	Greg Olley	10+15	4	1+1	0	0+1	0	11+17	4	1	0
23	DF	ENG	Joe Felix	21+4	1	0+2	0	0	0	21+6	1	3	0
27	DF	ENG	Morgan Williams	11+4	1	0	0	0	0	11+4	1	3	0
28	MF	ENG	Ollie Banks	22+14	7	1+1	0	1	0	24+15	7	10	1
29	DF	ENG	Zak Johnson	23+2	1	0	0	1	0	24+2	1	2	0
30	FW	ENG	Alex Newby	31+7	12	2	2	0+1	0	33+8	14	2	0
31	GK	ENG	George Sykes-Kenworthy	0	0	0	0	1	0	1	0	0	0
Player(s) who featured but departed the club during the season:
6	DF	ENG	Ash Palmer	6	0	2	0	0	0	8	0	1	0
7	FW	ENG	Tyrese Sinclair	10+2	0	0	0	0	0	10+2	0	2	0
11	FW	ATG	Ashley Nathaniel-George	0+8	0	0	0	0	0	0+8	0	0	0
25	FW	GAM	Mo Fadera	0+2	0	0	0	0	0	0+1	0	0	0
N/A	DF	ENG	Nico Lawrence	0	0	0	0	1	0	1	0	0	0

== Transfers ==
=== In ===
Date	Pos.	Name	From	Fee	Ref.
1 July 2025	MF	(England) Ollie Banks	(England) Chesterfield	Free	
1 July 2025	MF	(England) Alex Newby	(England) Altrincham	Free	
1 July 2025	DF	(England) Ash Palmer	(England) Chesterfield	Free	
1 July 2025	DF	(England) Mark Kitching	(England) Oldham Athletic	Free	
1 July 2025	MF	(England) Hiram Boateng	(England) Mansfield Town	Free	
1 July 2025	DF	(England) Ben Brookes	(England) Maidstone United	Free	
15 July 2025	FW	(England) Joe Grey	(England) Hartlepool United	Free	
15 July 2025	MF	(England) Greg Olley	(England) Gateshead	Free	
6 November 2025	DF	(England) Nico Lawrence	(England) Southampton	Free	
6 November 2025	FW	(England) Craig Hewitt	(England) Chorley	Free	
8 January 2026	DF	(England) Morgan Williams	(England) Yeovil Town	Free	

=== Out ===
Date	Pos.	Name	To	Fee	Ref.
9 July 2025	FW	(England) Dipo Akinyemi	(Northern Ireland) Derry City	Undisclosed	
1 November 2025	MF	(England) Marvin Armstrong	Retired	N/A	
4 January 2026	DF	(England) Nico Lawrence	Unattached	N/A	
9 January 2026	FW	(England) Billy Chadwick	(England) Gateshead	Free	

=== Loaned out ===
Date from	Date to	Pos.	Name	To	Ref.
3 July 2025	5 January 2026	DF	(England) Jeff King	(England) Boreham Wood	
14 July 2025	29 December 2025	FW	(England) Billy Chadwick	(England) Scunthorpe United	
15 July 2025	31 May 2026	DF	(England) Cameron John	(England) Hartlepool United	
18 July 2025	31 May 2026	DF	(England) Tyler Cordner	(England) AFC Totton	
19 July 2025	31 October 2025	GK	(England) Rory Watson	(England) Scunthorpe United	
26 July 2025	31 May 2026	FW	(England) Leone Gravata	(England) Horsham	
29 August 2025	30 June 2026	DF	(Republic of Ireland) Darragh O'Connor	(Scotland) Raith Rovers	
24 October 2025	31 May 2026	MF	(Northern Ireland) Paddy McLaughlin	(England) Darlington	
24 October 2025	6 January 2026	FW	(England) Tyrese Sinclair	(England) Solihull Moors	
7 November 2025	15 March 2026	MF	(England) Ricky Aguiar	(England) Horsham	
15 November 2025	9 January 2026	FW	(The Gambia) Mo Fadera	(England) Worksop Town	
16 December 2025	26 January 2026	FW	(Antigua and Barbuda) Ashley Nathaniel-George	(England) Hartlepool United	
28 January 2026	31 May 2026	FW	(England) Tyrese Sinclair	(England) Hartlepool United	
28 January 2026	31 May 2026	GK	(England) Rory Watson	(England) Darlington	
7 March 2026	7 April 2026	DF	(England) Ash Palmer	(England) FC Halifax Town	
13 March 2026	31 May 2026	FW	(The Gambia) Mo Fadera	(England) Guiseley	
26 March 2026	31 May 2026	MF	(England) Ricky Aguiar	(England) Eastleigh	
28 March 2025	31 May 2026	FW	(Antigua and Barbuda) Ashley Nathaniel-George	(England) Wealdstone	

=== Loaned in ===
Date from	Date to	Pos.	Name	From	Ref.
28 November 2025	30 June 2026	DF	(England) Zak Johnson	(England) Sunderland	

=== Released / Out of Contract ===
Date	Pos.	Name	Subsequent club	Join date	Ref.
1 July 2025	DF	(England) Olly Dyson	(England) Spennymoor Town	1 July 2025	
1 July 2025	DF	(England) Adam Crookes	(England) Gainsborough Trinity	1 July 2025	
1 July 2025	FW	(England) Lenell John-Lewis	(England) Boston United	1 July 2025	
1 July 2025	FW	(Afghanistan) Maziar Kouhyar	(England) Notts County	1 July 2025	
1 July 2025	FW	(England) Alex Hernandez	Unattached	–	
1 July 2025	DF	(England) Thierry Latty-Fairweather	(England) FC Halifax Town	18 July 2025	
1 July 2025	DF	(Netherlands) Levi Andoh	(England) Kettering Town	20 July 2025	
1 July 2025	FW	(Zimbabwe) Zanda Siziba	(England) Kidderminster Harriers	1 August 2025	

== Awards ==
=== National League Player of the Month ===
Month	Player	Ref.
November	(England) Ollie Pearce	
January	(England) Ollie Pearce	

=== National League Manager of the Month ===
Month	Manager	Ref.
November	(England) Stuart Maynard	
January	(England) Stuart Maynard	

=== National League Team of the Season ===
Pos	Player	Ref.
DF	(England) Malachi Fagan-Walcott	
MF	(England) Alex Hunt	
FW	(England) Ollie Pearce	
