= Zach Johnson (disambiguation) =

Zach Johnson (born 1976) is an American golfer, winner of two major championships.

Zach, Zack or Zachary Johnson may also refer to:

- Zac Johnson (politician) (born 1980/1981), American politician
- Zach J. Johnson, golf club professional; both Zach Johnsons played in the 2018 PGA Championship
- Zach Johnson, keyboardist and one of the vocalist of American rock band, I See Stars
- Zach Johnson (rugby league) (active from 2014), English rugby league footballer
- Zack "Jick" Johnson, one of the creators of Kingdom of Loathing
- Zachary Johnson (drummer), drummer
- Zachary Scot Johnson, American singer-songwriter
- Zack Johnson, see List of The Big Bang Theory characters
- Zack Johnson (American football), American football player

== See also ==
- Zak Johnson (born 2005), English footballer
