= Callum Howe =

English footballer (born 1994)

Personal information
- Full name: Callum Anthony Howe
- Date of birth: 9 April 1994 (age 32)
- Place of birth: Doncaster, England
- Height: 6 ft 0 in (1.83 m)
- Position: Defender

Team information
- Current team: Scunthorpe United
- Number: 6

Youth career
- –2012: Scunthorpe United

Senior career*
| Years | Team | Apps | (Gls) |
| 2012–2015 | Scunthorpe United | 0 | (0) |
| 2012–2013 | → Bradford Park Avenue (loan) | 2 | (0) |
| 2013 | → Frickley Athletic (loan) | | |
| 2013 | → Gainsborough Trinity (loan) | 24 | (2) |
| 2014 | → Gateshead (loan) | 2 | (1) |
| 2015 | → Alfreton Town (loan) | 13 | (1) |
| 2015–2018 | Lincoln City | 35 | (0) |
| 2016 | → Southport (loan) | 15 | (1) |
| 2017–2018 | → Eastleigh (loan) | 26 | (3) |
| 2018 | Port Vale | 3 | (0) |
| 2018–2019 | Harrogate Town | 44 | (9) |
| 2019–2023 | Solihull Moors | 107 | (12) |
| 2023–2026 | York City | 117 | (5) |
| 2026– | Scunthorpe United | 0 | (0) |
- * Club domestic league appearances and goals as of 13:50, 25 April 2026 (UTC)

Callum Anthony Howe (born 9 April 1994) is an English professional footballer who plays as a defender for EFL League Two club National League club Scunthorpe United.

Howe began his career at Scunthorpe United, turning professional in 2012. He spent three years at the club without making a first-team appearance and instead enjoyed loan spells at Bradford Park Avenue, Frickley Athletic, Gainsborough Trinity, Gateshead and Alfreton Town. He was named Frickley Athletic's Player of the Season for 2012–13. He signed with Lincoln City in July 2015. He had loan spells at Southport and Eastleigh before helping Lincoln to win the National League title in 2016–17. He was sold to Port Vale in January 2018 before moving on to Harrogate Town four months later. He was sold to Solihull Moors for an undisclosed fee in July 2019 and was named on the 2019–20 National League Team of the Year. In July 2023, he joined York City for an undisclosed fee and went on to be named on the 2024–25 National League Team of the Year, going on to win the National League title with York the following season. He rejoined Scunthorpe United in June 2026.

== Career ==
=== Scunthorpe United ===
Howe began his career at Scunthorpe United and was the only youth team player to be offered a professional contract by manager Alan Knill in 2012. On 3 December 2012, he joined Conference North side Bradford Park Avenue on a one-month loan. He made his first-team debut for the Avenue 12 days later in a 2–0 defeat at Worcester City. He made one further appearance before his loan spell at Horsfall Stadium came to an end. On 15 February 2013, he joined Frickley Athletic of the Northern Premier League Premier Division on a one-month loan; a colony of former Scunthorpe players were already at the club, including Terry Barwick, Joe Wilcox, Jake Picton and Tom Johnstone. United manager Brian Laws said that "I believe he will gain a lot of experience by going into the non-League system and playing some games". He impressed at the "Blues" so much as to win the club's Player of the Season award despite only arriving in the second half of the 2012–13 season.

On 22 November 2013, he returned to the Conference North after joining Gainsborough Trinity on a one-month loan deal, where fellow "Iron" player Jamie Wootton was also on loan. The next day he scored on his debut in a 2–0 victory at Colwyn Bay. His loan at The Northolme was extended until the end of the 2013–14 season. He played a total of 24 games for Steve Housham's "Holy Blues", scoring two goals. He signed a new one-year contract with Scunthorpe in May 2014 after reportedly being highly rated by manager Russ Wilcox.

On 10 October 2014, he joined Gateshead of the Conference Premier on a one-month loan. He joined the "Tynesiders" after manager Gary Mills lost James Curtis due to injury. The following day he was declared a hero on his "Heed" debut after scoring the equalising goal in a 1–1 draw at Forest Green Rovers, which stretched the club's unbeaten run to nine games. However, he only featured in one further game at the Gateshead International Stadium before his loan spell ended. On 16 January 2015, he joined Conference Premier side Alfreton Town on a three-month loan deal. He featured in 13 games for Nicky Law's "Reds", and scored one goal in a 4–2 win over Southport at North Street on 7 February. He was released by Scunthorpe at the end of the season.

=== Lincoln City ===
On 15 July 2015, Howe signed a one-year contract with Lincoln City after impressing manager Chris Moyses on trial. He became a first-team regular at Sincil Bank during the 2015–16 season, making 31 appearances. On 25 August 2016, he joined Southport on a one-month loan after "Sandgrounders" defender Chris Doyle picked up a long-term knee injury. He played 18 games for Steve Burr's Southport, and after returning to Lincoln he went on to feature 13 times in the latter half of the 2016–17 season as the club regained promotion to the English Football League after finishing as champions of the National League.

In June 2017, he signed a 12-month contract extension with Lincoln. However, "Imps" manager Danny Cowley stated that he was happy with the centre-back options in Luke Waterfall, Sean Raggett, Robert Dickie and Michael Bostwick, so would look to loan Howe out so that he could find first-team football elsewhere. On 15 August 2017, he joined National League side Eastleigh on a five-month loan deal, with the "Spitfires" missing both Réda Johnson and Ryan Cresswell due to injury. Manager Richard Hill said that: "I've known Callum and been a big admirer of his for quite a while, he and [centre-back] Boycey played together at Scunthorpe – in fact they're best mates". He went on to serve as club captain, scoring four goals in 28 matches, and upon being recalled by Lincoln in January, Eastleigh boss Andy Hessenthaler said that "he's been great, in the last couple of weeks especially".

=== Port Vale ===
On 31 January 2018, Howe joined Port Vale for an undisclosed fee, signing an 18-month contract. Manager Neil Aspin had also signed centre-backs Charlie Raglan and Kyle Howkins on loan earlier in the day. He was transfer-listed at the end of the 2017–18 season after making just three appearances for the "Valiants".

=== Harrogate Town ===
On 25 May 2018, Howe was sold to National League newcomers Harrogate Town for a "small fee". He scored nine goals from 48 appearances during the 2018–19 season, helping Simon Weaver's Town to reach the play-offs, where they were beaten 3–1 at AFC Fylde at the quarter-final stage. He was named as Harrogate's Players' Player of the Season.

=== Solihull Moors ===
On 27 July 2019, Howe signed a three-year contract with National League side Solihull Moors after moving for an undisclosed fee that was reported to be a Harrogate club record. He scored six goals in 45 appearances in the 2019–20 season, which was permanently suspended on 26 March due to the COVID-19 pandemic in England, with Moors in eighth-place. He was named on the National League Team of the Year, along with centre-back partner Alex Gudger. A knee injury restricted him to just five appearances in the 2020–21 campaign. He was given a two-year contract extension by manager Neal Ardley after returning to full fitness from hip surgery. He played 32 league games in the 2021–22 season and went on to score in the 3–1 play-off semi-final victory over Chesterfield at Damson Park. He played at the London Stadium in the play-off final, which ended in a 2–1 defeat to Grimsby Town after extra time. He was appointed as club captain following the departure of Kyle Storer in January 2023. He scored three goals in 36 games in the 2022–23 season.

=== York City ===
On 7 July 2023, Howe was signed by National League side York City for an undisclosed fee. He was sent off on his debut in a 3–1 defeat to Rochdale at the York Community Stadium. He was named in the National League Team of the Week for his performance in a 0–0 draw with Kidderminster Harriers on 9 March. He played 42 of York's 46 league games in the 2023–24 campaign, remaining a key first-team player under three managers – Mikey Morton, Neal Ardley and Adam Hinshelwood.

Howe captained York to four successive wins, which took the "Minstermen" to the top of the table by mid-September 2024. He was named in the Non-League Paper Team of the Day for his performance in a 0–0 draw away at Aldershot Town on 21 September. On 1 December, he was named in the Team of the Day and the Team of the Week after scoring in a 3–0 win over Southend United. In the return fixture with Aldershot Town, he scored and provided an assist in a 7–2 victory. He started every league game of the 2024–25 season. York qualified for the play-off semi-finals, where they were beaten by Oldham Athletic. He was named on the National League Team of the Year for the second time, alongside teammates Harrison Male and Ollie Pearce.

He missed a month of action after sustaining a head injury in mid-November 2025. Three months later, he earned praise from manager Stuart Maynard for his leadership qualities and hard work during training. However, he suffered a second concussion and lost his first-team place to loanee Zak Johnson. He played 31 games during the 2025–26 campaign, including a substitute appearance in the 1–1 draw away to Rochdale that won York the league title and promotion back into the Football League. He was offered a new contract, but decided to reject it in favour of a move elsewhere.

=== Return to Scunthorpe United ===
On 19 June 2026, Howe agreed to return to Scunthorpe United on a two-year deal to begin on 1 July; the move saw him join the same squad as his younger brother Declan.

== Style of play ==
Howe is a central defender with good aerial ability in both boxes.

== Career statistics ==
As of match played 25 April 2026

Appearances and goals by club, season and competition
| Club | Season | League | | | FA Cup | | EFL Cup | | Other | | Total | |
| Club | Season | Division | Apps | Goals | Apps | Goals | Apps | Goals | Apps | Goals | Apps | Goals |
|---|---|---|---|---|---|---|---|---|---|---|---|---|
| Scunthorpe United | 2012–13 | League One | 0 | 0 | 0 | 0 | 0 | 0 | 0 | 0 | 0 | 0 |
| Scunthorpe United | 2013–14 | League Two | 0 | 0 | 0 | 0 | 0 | 0 | 0 | 0 | 0 | 0 |
| Scunthorpe United | 2014–15 | League One | 0 | 0 | 0 | 0 | 0 | 0 | 0 | 0 | 0 | 0 |
| Scunthorpe United | Total | | 0 | 0 | 0 | 0 | 0 | 0 | 0 | 0 | 0 | 0 |
| Bradford Park Avenue (loan) | 2012–13 | Conference North | 2 | 0 | 0 | 0 | — | | 0 | 0 | 2 | 0 |
| Gainsborough Trinity (loan) | 2013–14 | Conference North | 24 | 2 | 0 | 0 | — | | 0 | 0 | 24 | 2 |
| Gateshead (loan) | 2014–15 | Conference Premier | 2 | 1 | 0 | 0 | — | | 0 | 0 | 2 | 1 |
| Alfreton Town (loan) | 2014–15 | Conference Premier | 13 | 1 | 0 | 0 | — | | 0 | 0 | 13 | 1 |
| Lincoln City | 2015–16 | National League | 27 | 0 | 3 | 0 | — | | 1 (Note: Appearance(s) in the FA Trophy) | 0 | 31 | 0 |
| Lincoln City | 2016–17 | National League | 8 | 0 | 0 | 0 | — | | 5 | 0 | 13 | 0 |
| Lincoln City | 2017–18 | League Two | 0 | 0 | 0 | 0 | 0 | 0 | 0 | 0 | 0 | 0 |
| Lincoln City | Total | | 35 | 0 | 3 | 0 | 0 | 0 | 6 | 0 | 44 | 0 |
| Southport (loan) | 2016–17 | National League | 15 | 1 | 3 | 0 | — | | 0 | 0 | 18 | 1 |
| Eastleigh (loan) | 2017–18 | National League | 26 | 3 | 1 | 1 | — | | 1 | 0 | 28 | 4 |
| Port Vale | 2017–18 | League Two | 3 | 0 | — | | — | | — | | 3 | 0 |
| Harrogate Town | 2018–19 | National League | 44 | 9 | 1 | 0 | — | | 3 (Note: 2 appearances in FA Trophy and 1 appearance in play-offs) | 0 | 48 | 9 |
| Solihull Moors | 2019–20 | National League | 38 | 5 | 3 | 0 | — | | 4 (Note: 2 appearances in FA Trophy, 2 appearances and 1 goal in Scottish Challenge Cup) | 1 | 45 | 6 |
| Solihull Moors | 2020–21 | National League | 4 | 1 | 1 | 0 | — | | 0 | 0 | 5 | 1 |
| Solihull Moors | 2021–22 | National League | 32 | 3 | 3 | 0 | — | | 3 (Note: 1 appearance in FA Trophy and 2 appearances and 1 goal in play-offs) | 1 | 38 | 4 |
| Solihull Moors | 2022–23 | National League | 33 | 3 | 1 | 0 | — | | 2 | 0 | 36 | 3 |
| Solihull Moors | Total | | 107 | 12 | 8 | 0 | 0 | 0 | 9 | 2 | 124 | 14 |
| York City | 2023–24 | National League | 42 | 2 | 4 | 0 | — | | 0 | 0 | 46 | 2 |
| York City | 2024–25 | National League | 46 | 3 | 2 | 0 | — | | 2 (Note: 1 appearance in the FA Trophy and 1 appearance in the play-offs) | 0 | 50 | 3 |
| York City | 2025–26 | National League | 29 | 0 | 1 | 0 | — | | 1 | 0 | 31 | 0 |
| York City | Total | | 117 | 5 | 7 | 0 | 0 | 0 | 3 | 0 | 127 | 5 |
| Scunthorpe United | 2026–27 | National League | 0 | 0 | 0 | 0 | — | | 0 | 0 | 0 | 0 |
| Career total | | | 388 | 34 | 23 | 1 | 0 | 0 | 22 | 2 | 433 | 37 |

== Honours ==
Lincoln City

- National League: 2016–17

York City

- National League: 2025–26

Individual

- Frickley Athletic Player of the Season: 2012–13
- National League Team of the Year: 2019–20, 2024–25
