= Thesongadayproject =

YouTube channel

Thesongadayproject is a musical project that was created by the American singer-songwriter Zachary Scot Johnson in September 2012. The first day (September 6, 2012), featured a cover version of Donovan's "Catch The Wind". Johnson set out with a goal to record a song a day, every day, for as long as he could. Johnson performs originals songs and favorite covers. He often performs music by favorite singers and songwriters and has replicated many albums in their entirety. As of June, 2026, Johnson has uploaded over 5,000 songs, spanning over thirteen full years, and has accumulated over 43 million views.

His videos through day 2354 were recorded completely live, with no editing. At that point, he began using multi-track recording and playing multiple instruments and/or adding vocal harmonies in most videos.

After the first full year of videos had gone up, Johnson began asking his favorite musicians to join him for guest collaborations. Over 350 musicians have joined Johnson for these videos.

The 1,000th consecutive day featured a collaboration with Jeremy Messersmith. The two performed a duet of Sia's song "Chandelier".

The 2,000th consecutive day featured a collaboration with Gretchen Peters. They performed her song "Five Minutes".

On the 2,131st consecutive day, a pre-recorded intro from Cal Ripken Jr. showed before the video. Ripken congratulated Zachary for reaching the same number of consecutive days as matched his own "Iron Man Streak" in Major League Baseball.
