= Zach Johnson (rugby league) =

English rugby league footballer

Personal information
- Full name: Zachary Johnson
- Born: 1991 (age 34–35) Dewsbury, West Yorkshire, England
- Height: 6 ft 3 in (1.91 m)
- Weight: 18 st 6 lb (117 kg)

Playing information
- Position: Prop
Club
Years	Team	Pld	T	G	FG	P
2014	Swinton Lions	22	1	0	0	4
2015–16	Dewsbury Rams
2016(loan)	→ Swinton Lions	7	0	0	0	0
2016(loan)	→ Hunslet Hawks	3	0	0	0	0
2017	Coventry Bears	0	0	0	0	0
2020	Hunslet RLFC	0	0	0	0	0
	Total	32	1	0	0	4
- Source: As of 21 April 2021

Zachary Johnson is a former English professional rugby league footballer who last played as a prop for Hunslet in RFL League 1.

== Background ==
Johnson was born in Dewsbury, West Yorkshire, England.

== Career ==
=== Swinton Lions ===
Johnson started his career with the Swinton Lions and has previously spent time on loan at the Hunslet Hawks in Kingstone Press League 1.

=== Coventry Bears ===
On 3 Feb 2017 the club announced that Zach had signed for Coventry Bears

=== Hunslet R.L.F.C. ===
On 3 Jan 2020 it was reported that he had signed for Hunslet R.L.F.C. in the RFL League 1, but by Feb 2021 he had left Hunslet.
