= Malachi Fagan-Walcott =

English footballer (born 2002)

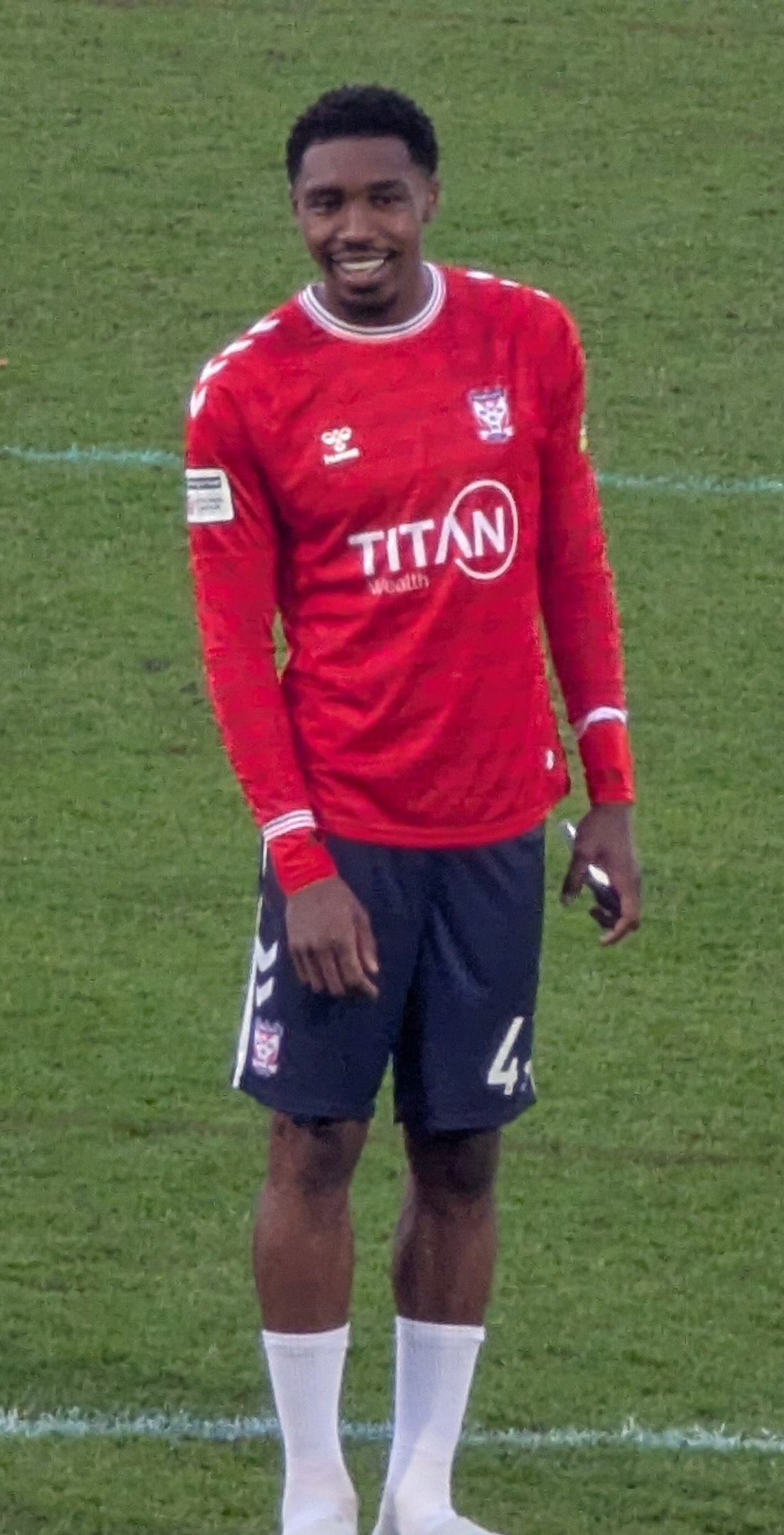
- Fagan-Walcott in 2026

Personal information
- Full name: Malachi Michael Fagan-Walcott
- Date of birth: 11 March 2002 (age 24)
- Place of birth: Edmonton, Greater London, England
- Height: 6 ft 2 in (1.87 m)
- Position: Centre-back

Team information
- Current team: Heart of Midlothian
- Number: 64

Youth career
- –2015: Norsemen
- 2015–2020: Tottenham Hotspur

Senior career*
| Years | Team | Apps | (Gls) |
| 2020–2023 | Tottenham Hotspur | 0 | (0) |
| 2021 | → Dundee (loan) | 2 | (0) |
| 2023–2025 | Cardiff City | 1 | (0) |
| 2024 | → Dunfermline Athletic (loan) | 15 | (3) |
| 2024–2025 | → York City (loan) | 17 | (1) |
| 2025–2026 | York City | 58 | (13) |
| 2026– | Heart of Midlothian | 3 | (0) |

International career
| 2018 | England U16 | 5 | (0) |
| 2018–2019 | England U17 | 4 | (0) |
- * Club domestic league appearances and goals as of 25 October 2026 (UTC)

Malachi Michael Fagan-Walcott (born 11 March 2002) is an English professional footballer who plays as a centre-back for Scottish Premiership club Heart of Midlothian.

Born in Edmonton, Fagan-Walcott began his career as youth with local side Norsemen, before further developing as part of Tottenham Hotspur's academy. He has subsequently played for Dundee, Cardiff City, Dunfermline Athletic and York City, as well as representing England at under 16 and under 17 level.

== Club career ==
=== Tottenham Hotspur ===
Born in Edmonton, Greater London, Fagan-Walcott was brought up in Waltham Abbey, Essex, and attended Debden Park High School. He is a youth product of Norsemen, and signed with Tottenham Hotspur in 2015. He signed his first professional contract with Tottenham on 17 July 2018. He debuted with Tottenham in a 0-3 UEFA Champions League round of 16 loss to RB Leipzig on 10 March 2020 and was, at the time, Spurs' youngest ever Champions League player.

==== Loan to Dundee ====
On 28 January 2021, Fagan-Walcott joined Scottish Championship side Dundee on loan until the end of the season. In March, after making two appearances, Dundee confirmed that Fagan-Walcott would return to his parent club due to injury.

=== Cardiff City ===
After he was released from Tottenham in the summer of 2023, Cardiff City confirmed in September that they had signed Fagan-Walcott and placed him in the under–21 squad.

On 12 January 2024, Fagan-Walcott rejoined manager James McPake, who brought him to Dundee, on loan at Scottish Championship club Dunfermline Athletic until the end of the season. He made his debut on 27 January in an away league draw against Dundee United. Fagan-Walcott scored his first goal for the Pars on 17 February in a league draw against Arbroath. He scored again in the following game, a winning effort away to Partick Thistle.

On 7 June 2024, Cardiff announced it had extended the player's contract. Fagan-Walcott made his debut for Cardiff on 13 August, coming on as a substitute in an EFL Cup win over Bristol Rovers. Fagan-Walcott made his league debut for the Bluebirds as a substitute in the Championship opener away to Burnley.

=== York City ===
On 2 September 2024, Fagan-Walcott joined National League club York City on a season-long loan deal.

On 24 December 2024, he agreed to join the club on a permanent basis for an undisclosed fee, the deal becoming active from 2 January 2025. Fagan-Walcott enjoyed a standout 2025–26 season, being nominated for the National League Team of the Season and Young Player of the Year awards in a campaign that saw York City declared champions and promoted to the EFL League Two. On 4 June 2026, York accepted a seven-figure offer from Scottish Premiership club Heart of Midlothian for Fagan-Walcott.

=== Heart of Midlothian ===
On 18th June 2026, Hearts announced that Fagan-Walcott had joined the club on a four year deal.

== International career ==
Fagan-Walcott was included in the England under-17 squad for the 2019 UEFA European Under-17 Championship.

== Career statistics ==
As of 7 November 2026

Appearances and goals by club, season and competition
| Club | Season | League | | | National cup | | League cup | | Europe | | Other | | Total | |
| Club | Season | Division | Apps | Goals | Apps | Goals | Apps | Goals | Apps | Goals | Apps | Goals | Apps | Goals |
|---|---|---|---|---|---|---|---|---|---|---|---|---|---|---|
| Tottenham Hotspur U21 | 2018–19 | — | | | — | | — | | ="2"|— | | 1 (Note: Appearance(s) in the EFL Trophy) | 0 | 1 | 0 |
| Tottenham Hotspur U21 | 2019–20 | — | | | — | | — | | — | | 1 | 0 | 1 | 0 |
| Tottenham Hotspur U21 | 2021–22 | — | | | — | | — | | — | | 2 | 0 | 2 | 0 |
| Tottenham Hotspur U21 | 2022–23 | — | | | — | | — | | — | | 2 | 0 | 2 | 0 |
| Tottenham Hotspur U21 | Total | | 0 | 0 | 0 | 0 | 0 | 0 | 0 | 0 | 6 | 0 | 6 | 0 |
| Tottenham Hotspur | 2018–19 | Premier League | 0 | 0 | 0 | 0 | 0 | 0 | 0 | 0 | 0 | 0 | 0 | 0 |
| Tottenham Hotspur | 2019–20 | Premier League | 0 | 0 | 0 | 0 | 0 | 0 | 1 (Note: Appearance in UEFA Champions League) | 0 | 0 | 0 | 1 | 0 |
| Tottenham Hotspur | 2020–21 | Premier League | 0 | 0 | 0 | 0 | 0 | 0 | 0 | 0 | 0 | 0 | 0 | 0 |
| Tottenham Hotspur | 2021–22 | Premier League | 0 | 0 | 0 | 0 | 0 | 0 | 0 | 0 | 0 | 0 | 0 | 0 |
| Tottenham Hotspur | 2022–23 | Premier League | 0 | 0 | 0 | 0 | 0 | 0 | 0 | 0 | 0 | 0 | 0 | 0 |
| Tottenham Hotspur | Total | | 0 | 0 | 0 | 0 | 0 | 0 | 1 | 0 | 0 | 0 | 1 | 0 |
| Dundee (loan) | 2020–21 | Scottish Championship | 2 | 0 | 0 | 0 | 0 | 0 | — | | 0 | 0 | 2 | 0 |
| Cardiff City | 2023–24 | EFL Championship | 0 | 0 | 0 | 0 | 0 | 0 | — | | 0 | 0 | 0 | 0 |
| Cardiff City | 2024–25 | EFL Championship | 1 | 0 | 0 | 0 | 2 | 0 | — | | 0 | 0 | 3 | 0 |
| Cardiff City | Total | | 1 | 0 | 0 | 0 | 2 | 0 | 0 | 0 | 0 | 0 | 3 | 0 |
| Dunfermline Athletic (loan) | 2023–24 | Scottish Championship | 15 | 3 | — | | — | | — | | 0 | 0 | 15 | 3 |
| York City (loan) | 2024–25 | National League | 17 | 1 | 1 | 0 | — | | — | | 0 | 0 | 18 | 1 |
| York City | 2024–25 | National League | 22 | 5 | — | | — | | — | | 2 (Note: Appearance(s) in the FA Trophy and National League play-offs) | 0 | 24 | 5 |
| York City | 2025–26 | National League | 36 | 8 | 1 | 0 | 0 | 0 | 0 | 0 | 0 | 0 | 37 | 8 |
| York City | Total | | 75 | 14 | 2 | 0 | 0 | 0 | 0 | 0 | 2 | 0 | 79 | 14 |
| Heart of Midlothian | 2026–27 | Scottish Premiership | 3 | 0 | 0 | 0 | 1 | 0 | 5 | 0 | 0 | 0 | 9 | 0 |
| Heart of Midlothian | Total | | 3 | 0 | 0 | 0 | 1 | 0 | 5 | 0 | 0 | 0 | 9 | 0 |
| Career total | | | 96 | 17 | 2 | 0 | 3 | 0 | 6 | 0 | 8 | 0 | 115 | 17 |

== Honours ==
York City

- National League: 2025–26

Individual

- National League Team of the Season: 2025–26
