= Zachary Scot Johnson =

American singer and songwriter

- Born: Zachary Scot Johnson; July 11, 1982 (age 43); Racine, Wisconsin, U.S.
- Occupations: Musician, actor
- Years active: 2001–present
- Website: www.thesongadayproject.com

Zachary Scot Johnson is an American singer-songwriter, born in 1982 in Racine, Wisconsin, United States. He attended Lawrence University in Appleton, Wisconsin from 2001 through 2006, where he was a triple major student in Music Performance, Theatre Arts and Psychology. He released his first album, Moment of Clarity in 2004, and followed that up with To Whom It May Concern in 2008, Live at the Guild in 2010, "Sad Songs" in 2017, his self-titled record "Zachary Scot Johnson" in 2023 & "Echoes: A Solo Piano Tribute to George Winston", which is an instrumental piano album, in 2025. He has lived in or near Saint Paul, Minnesota for a number of years and performs locally with regularity.

He has toured consistently since 2001 and opened for artists such as Shawn Colvin, Keb' Mo', Kevin Costner, Rita Wilson, The Be Good Tanyas, Jane Siberry, Don Williams, Marc Cohn and Juliette Lewis.

== Thesongadayproject ==
Starting in 2012, Zach began a YouTube channel entitled Thesongadayproject. On the channel, he records a song every day. The channel hit its 1000th consecutive day on June 2, 2015, with a duet with Jeremy Messersmith on a Sia song, "Chandelier". The channel hit its 2000th consecutive day on February 26, 2018, with a duet with Gretchen Peters on her song "Five Minutes". The channel is still currently running. Johnson records both original compositions and cover songs of favorite artists. The channel has more than 43 million total views over the first 5, 000 days. Johnson has also invited many artists to perform duets with him. Among the more than 250 artists to appear at this point are Donovan, Shawn Colvin, Rosanne Cash, Marc Cohn, Rodney Crowell, Jeff Daniels, Noel Paul Stookey of Peter, Paul and Mary, Peter Yarrow of Peter, Paul and Mary, Creed Bratton of The Office, Gaelic Storm, Tom Paxton, Lisa Loeb, JD Souther, Melissa Manchester, Nellie McKay, Kris Allen, David Wilcox, Collective Soul, Paula Cole, Richie Furay, Mary Gauthier and many more.
