= Alex Hunt =

English footballer (born 2000)

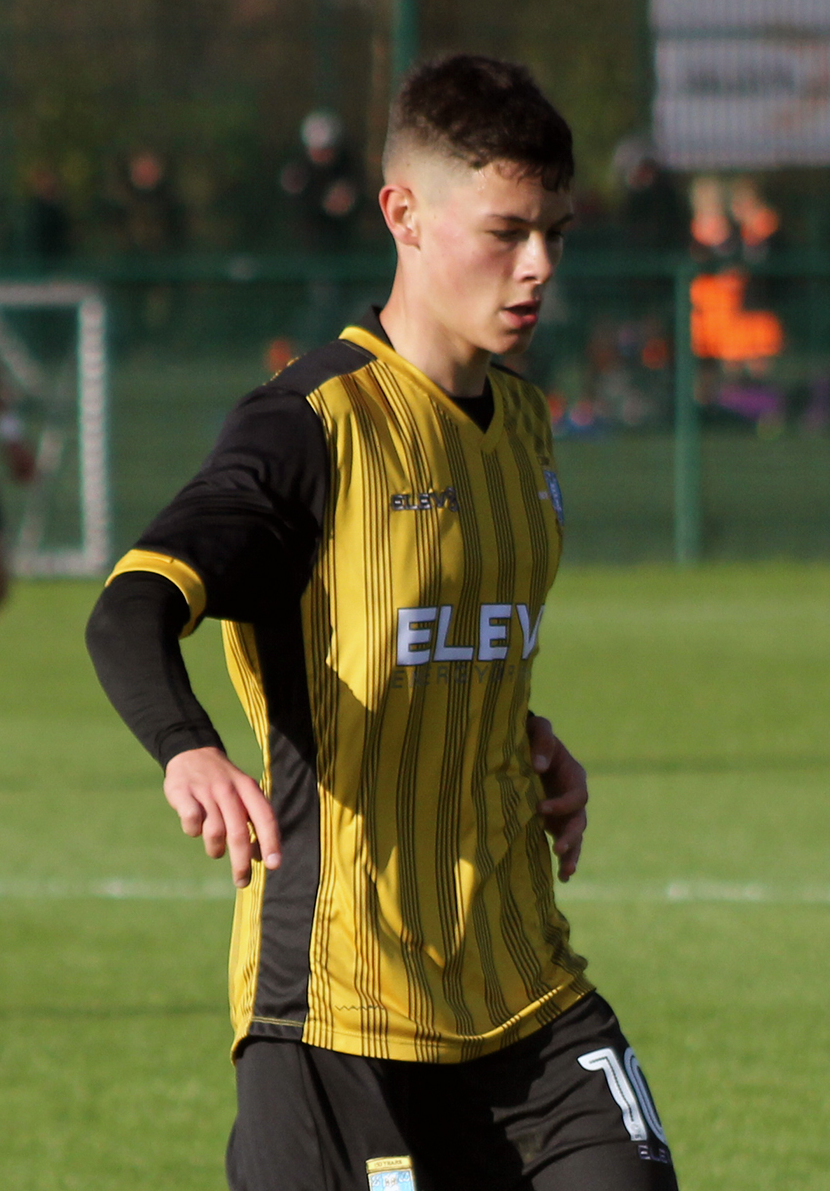
- Hunt in 2017

Personal information
- Full name: Alexander John Hunt
- Date of birth: 29 May 2000 (age 26)
- Place of birth: Sheffield, England
- Height: 5 ft 7 in (1.70 m)
- Position: Midfielder

Team information
- Current team: York City
- Number: 8

Youth career
- 2008–2018: Sheffield Wednesday

Senior career*
Years	Team	Apps	(Gls)
2018–2022	Sheffield Wednesday	9	(0)
2021–2022	→ Grimsby Town (loan)	19	(1)
2022	→ Oldham Athletic (loan)	13	(0)
2022–2024	Grimsby Town	32	(1)
2024	→ York City (loan)	9	(0)
2024–	York City	106	(15)
- * Club domestic league appearances and goals as of 17:24, 21 November 2026 (UTC)

Alexander John Hunt (born 29 May 2000) is an English professional footballer who plays as a midfielder for EFL League Two club York City.

== Career ==
=== Sheffield Wednesday ===
Hunt joined the Sheffield Wednesday Academy at the age of seven where he went on to become the club captain of the under-18s. He signed his first professional contract with the Owls in February 2018 as well as being nominated for the LFE Apprentice of the Year award in the same year, where he was eventually beaten by Ryan Sessegnon. He made his first team debut in the first round of the EFL Cup against Sunderland on 16 August 2018. On 17 September 2019, Hunt signed a new two-year contract at Sheffield Wednesday taking him until the end of the 20–21 season. At the end of the 20–21 season, the club activated a one-year extension to his contract.

On 12 August 2021, he joined Grimsby Town on loan, initially until January 2022. He made his debut on the opening day of the 2021–22 season, starting the game against Weymouth. He scored his first professional goal from a direct free-kick in stoppage time to win three points against Barnet. Upon his return from his loan spell, he signed a new 18-month contract with The Owls, keeping him at the club until the summer of 2023. A few days later on 17 January 2022, he joined Oldham Athletic on loan until the end of the season. He made his debut against Harrogate Town where they lost 3–0.

=== Grimsby Town ===
On 1 September 2022, Hunt re-joined Grimsby Town on a three-year deal. Hunt was part of the Grimsby team that reached the FA Cup quarter final for the first time since 1939, he started in the 2–1 win away at Premier League side Southampton that secured that achievement.

On 22 February 2024, he joined National League side, York City on loan for the remainder of the season.

=== York City ===
On 11 June 2024, it was confirmed Hunt would rejoin York City on a permanent basis for an undisclosed fee. He signed a new multi-year deal in September 2025.

Following the club's title-winning campaign, he was named in the National League Team of the Season for the 2025–26 season.

== Career statistics ==
As of 21 November 2026

Appearances and goals by club, season and competition
Club	Season	League			FA Cup		League Cup		Other		Total	
Club	Season	Division	Apps	Goals	Apps	Goals	Apps	Goals	Apps	Goals	Apps	Goals
Sheffield Wednesday	2018–19	Championship	0	0	0	0	1	0	—		1	0
Sheffield Wednesday	2019–20	Championship	6	0	2	0	0	0	—		8	0
Sheffield Wednesday	2020–21	Championship	3	0	1	0	1	0	—		5	0
Sheffield Wednesday	2021–22	League One	0	0	0	0	0	0	—		0	0
Sheffield Wednesday	2022–23	League One	0	0	0	0	2	0	1 (Note: Appearance(s) in EFL Trophy)	0	3	0
Sheffield Wednesday	Total		9	0	3	0	4	0	1	0	17	0
Grimsby Town (loan)	2021–22	National League	18	1	0	0	—		1 (Note: Appearance(s) in FA Trophy)	0	19	1
Oldham Athletic (loan)	2021–22	League Two	13	0	—		—		—		13	0
Grimsby Town	2022–23	League Two	20	1	5	0	—		—		25	1
Grimsby Town	2023–24	League Two	12	0	3	1	0	0	3	0	18	1
Grimsby Town	Total		32	1	8	1	0	0	3	0	43	2
York City (loan)	2023–24	National League	9	0	0	0	—		0	0	9	0
York City	2024–25	National League	45	4	2	0	—		1 (Note: Appearance in the National League play-offs.)	0	48	4
York City	2025–26	National League	45	9	2	0	—		1	0	48	9
York City	2026–27	League Two	16	2	1	1	1	0	0	0	18	3
York City	Total		106	15	5	1	1	0	2	0	114	16
Career total			187	17	16	2	5	0	7	0	215	19

== Honours ==
York City

- National League: 2025–26

Individual

- National League Team of the Season: 2025–26
