= Ollie Pearce =

English association football player

Personal information
- Full name: Oliver Robert Pearce
- Date of birth: 8 August 1995 (age 31)
- Place of birth: Brighton, England
- Height: 5 ft 8 in (1.73 m)
- Position: Striker

Team information
- Current team: York City
- Number: 10

Youth career
- 2011–2013: Midhurst & Easebourne

Senior career*
Years	Team	Apps	(Gls)
2013–2018	Bognor Regis Town	169	(55)
2018–2024	Worthing	199	(130)
2024–	York City	107	(72)

International career
2024	England C	1	(0)
- * Club domestic league appearances and goals as of 20:17, 21 November 2026 (UTC)

Oliver Robert Pearce (born 8 August 1995) is an English professional footballer who plays as a striker for EFL League Two club York City.

A prolific non-League striker, Pearce began his senior career in the Isthmian League with Bognor Regis Town, before moving onto rivals Worthing and continuing his sustained rich vein of goalscoring form. His success at Worthing saw him make the move up to Step 1 for the first time with York City, where he again topped the scoring charts.

== Club career ==
=== Bognor Regis Town ===
Pearce made his debut for Bognor Regis Town aged 17 after previously appearing for Midhurst & Easebourne whilst also representing England Colleges. Pearce signed for Bognor after a trial arranged by his Dad.

Pearce enjoyed a goal-laden career at Nyewood Lane scoring around 80 goals in a little over 250 appearances, including four in four at the start of 2017–18. His goals fired the club to an FA Trophy semi-finals in the 2015–2016 season and the Isthmian League promotion campaign a year later. This success drew attention from local rivals Worthing.

=== Worthing ===
Pearce joined Worthing during the 2018 close season. He made his debut away at Haringey Borough on 1 September 2018 and scored his first goal for the club, as a substitute, in a 4–3 win at Lewes on 3 October 2018.

In 2021–22, Pearce was the Isthmian League Premier Division's leading scorer with 35 league goals, winning the Golden Boot and Player of the Season awards and a place in the Team of the Season as Worthing won the title and promotion to the National League South.

He scored his 100th goal for Worthing, in his 178th appearance, with a lobbed finish in a 6–0 home win over Dulwich Hamlet on 21 February 2023. He passed 30 goals in all competitions again that season and was named in the National League South Team of the Season.

During the 2023–24 season Pearce set a post-war club record by scoring in ten consecutive matches, from New Year's Day to the end of February. He reached 150 goals for the club with a stoppage-time strike in a 3–1 win at eventual champions Yeovil Town on 6 April 2024.

=== York City ===
On 25 May 2024, Pearce signed for National League club York City on a free transfer, after much speculation as to his next destination. He reunited with former manager Adam Hinshelwood, who had made the same move just three months prior. He was awarded the National League's player of the month for November, as well as being included in the half team of the season "so far". He ended the season as the league's top goalscorer in his first season at that level with 31 goals, was awarded the league's player of the year, and was named in the league's team of the season. He was also awarded the Sports Circle Player of the Year at the National Game Awards.

The following season, he again finished as the league's top goalscorer, with 34 goals, as York City were promoted to EFL League Two on the final day of the season. He was also named the league's player of the year and included in the league's team of the season for consecutive seasons. He was also awarded "Clubman of the Year" at York in May 2026.

Pearce scored his first Football League goal on 1 September 2026, netting in a 3–2 defeat to Cheltenham Town in League Two.

On 15 September 2026, Pearce started for York in an EFL Trophy match, but was substituted after just 44 seconds. Manager Scott Lindsey criticised the competitions rules, which stipulated that one starter from the previous league game had to start.

== International career ==
In March 2024, Pearce was named in the England C 16-man squad to face Wales C at Stebonheath Park, Llanelli on 19 March. He made an appearance as a second half substitute in a 1–0 loss.

== Career statistics ==
As of match played 21 November 2026

Appearances and goals by club, season and competition
Club	Season	League			FA Cup		EFL Cup		Other		Total	
Club	Season	Division	Apps	Goals	Apps	Goals	Apps	Goals	Apps	Goals	Apps	Goals
Bognor Regis Town	2013–14	IL Premier Division	30	13	3	1	—		3 (Note: Three appearances, one goal in FA Trophy; one appearance in Isthmian League Premier Division play-offs)	1	36	15
Bognor Regis Town	2014–15	IL Premier Division	39	17	2	0	—		2 (Note: Appearances in FA Trophy)	1	43	18
Bognor Regis Town	2015–16	IL Premier Division	42	8	4	1	—		10 (Note: Nine appearances, one goal in FA Trophy; one appearance in Isthmian League Premier Division play-offs)	1	56	10
Bognor Regis Town	2016–17	IL Premier Division	43	9	2	0	—		3 (Note: One appearance, one goal in FA Trophy; two appearances, three goals in Isthmian League Premier Division play-offs)	4	48	13
Bognor Regis Town	2017–18	National League South	15	8	1	0	—		0	0	16	8
Bognor Regis Town	Total		169	55	12	2	0	0	18	7	199	64
Worthing	2018–19	IL Premier Division	33	12	4	1	—		3 (Note: One appearance in Alan Turvey Trophy; two appearances, two goals in FA Trophy)	2	40	15
Worthing	2019–20	IL Premier Division	28	13	4	1	—		7 (Note: Four appearances, four goals in Sussex Senior Cup; one appearance in FA Trophy; two appearances in Alan Turvey Trophy)	4	39	18
Worthing	2020–21	IL Premier Division	8	5	1	0	—		2 (Note: One appearance, one goal in FA Trophy; one appearance, one goal in Sussex Senior Cup)	2	11	7
Worthing	2021–22	IL Premier Division	42	35	2	0	—		7 (Note: Three appearances, one goal in FA Trophy; four appearances, three goals in Sussex Senior Cup)	4	51	39
Worthing	2022–23	National League South	44	25	2	2	—		7 (Note: Two appearances, two goals in FA Trophy; three appearances, three goals in Sussex Senior Cup; two appearances in National League South play-offs)	5	53	32
Worthing	2023–24	National League South	44	40	2	0	—		5 (Note: One appearance, one goal in FA Trophy; two appearances, two goals in Sussex Senior Cup; two appearances, three goals in National League South play-offs)	6	51	46
Worthing	Total		199	130	15	4	0	0	31	23	245	157
York City	2024–25	National League	45	31	2	2	—		3 (Note: Two appearances in FA Trophy; one appearance in National League play-offs)	0	50	33
York City	2025–26	National League	46	34	2	0	—		1	1	49	35
York City	2026–27	League Two	16	7	1	2	1	0	1 (Note: Appearance in EFL Trophy)	0	19	9
York City	Total		107	72	5	4	1	0	5	1	118	77
Career total			475	257	32	10	1	0	54	31	562	298

== Honours ==
Worthing

- Isthmian League Premier Division: 2021–22

York City

- National League: 2025–26

Individual

- National League Player of the Month: November 2024, November 2025, January 2026
- National League South Player of the Month: December 2023, February 2024
- National League Team of the Season: 2024–25, 2025–26
- National League South Player of the Season: 2023–24
- National League South Team of the Season: 2023–24
