= Stuart Maynard =

English football manager (born 1980)

Personal information
- Full name: Stuart Albert Maynard
- Date of birth: 18 October 1980 (age 46)
- Place of birth: Aylesbury, Buckinghamshire, England
- Position: Midfielder

Youth career
- –1999: Watford

Senior career*
Years	Team	Apps	(Gls)
1999	St Albans City	0	(0)
1999–2000	Wealdstone	9	(1)
2000	St Albans City	2	(0)
2000–2002	Aylesbury United	65	(10)
2002–2003	Enfield	34	(2)
2003–2005	Hitchin Town	40	(2)
2005–2006	Dunstable Town		
2006–2007	Chesham United		
2007–2008	Barton Rovers		
2008	Halesowen Town	4	(0)
2008–2009	Aylesbury United	7	(2)
2009–2010	Aylesbury Vale Dynamos	11	(0)
2010–2011	Hemel Hempstead Town		

Managerial career
- 2021–2024: Wealdstone
- 2024–2025: Notts County
- 2025–2026: York City
- * Club domestic league appearances and goals

Stuart Albert Maynard (born 18 October 1980) is an English football manager and former player who was most recently the manager of EFL League Two club York City.

== Early life ==
Stuart Albert Maynard was born on 18 October 1980 in Aylesbury, Buckinghamshire.

== Playing career ==
Maynard started off his career as an apprentice at Watford, before being released in 1999 after the Hertfordshire based team reached the Premier League. He then went on to have brief spells with FC Groningen and St Albans City, before joining Wealdstone. Maynard made 11 appearances for the Stones, scoring once away to Worthing in December 1999, before returning to St Albans in 2000. Maynard would then go on to spend two years at Aylesbury United, before spending another nine years in non-League football.

== Coaching career ==
=== Assistant manager ===
In May 2012, Maynard was appointed as assistant manager at Hemel Hempstead Town, with former teammate Dean Brennan being appointed as manager. The pair guided Hemel to the Southern League title in 2013–14, and to the First Round of the FA Cup the following season, where they lost 3–1 to Bury. Maynard helped the club to reach the National League South playoffs in 2017–18, where they were eliminated on penalties by Braintree Town in the semi-final.

On 18 September 2018, Maynard and Brennan were appointed by owner Glenn Tamplin as the managerial team at National League South club Billericay Town. However, they both had their contracts terminated by Tamplin after less than four months in the job on Wednesday 16 January 2019.

On 12 February 2019, the pair joined Isthmian League Premier Division club Kingstonian. However, on 16 March 2019, following a breakdown in relations with a club director over player liaison and team strategy, Maynard and Brennan re-evaluated their position and resigned after just five games in charge.

On 21 May 2019, Maynard and Brennan joined National League South club Wealdstone, with Maynard initially the assistant manager. In the shortened 2019–20 season, the duo led the club to automatic promotion to the National League, as champions of the National League South. On 2 February 2021, Brennan resigned from his role at Wealdstone, with Maynard remaining at the club.

=== Wealdstone ===
Following Brennan's departure, Maynard was initially appointed as Wealdstone's interim manager, before being appointed permanently on 11 March 2021, with Matthew Saunders as his assistant manager. The back end of the 2020–21 season saw the club struggle, a number of first team players were furloughed which contributed to Wealdstone suffering multiple heavy defeats at the start of Maynard's tenure. In spite of this, the club still finished in 19th, clear of what would have been the relegation zone.

Maynard's first full season as Wealdstone manager saw the club finish 16th, their highest league finish in 35 years. They finished 19 points clear of the bottom three, in a season which also saw Maynard help Wealdstone to a league double over local rivals Barnet and his former colleague Dean Brennan. On 12 May 2022, Maynard and Saunders were both given two year contract extensions.

In the 2022–23 season, Maynard bettered his previous efforts by taking Wealdstone to 13th, their highest league finish in 36 years. The season included notable victories against Oldham Athletic and Gateshead, the latter taking them to the top of the National League table. Maynard and Saunders signed further two year extensions in July 2023, lengthening their tenure at the club until the end of the 2025–26 season.

=== Notts County ===
On 18 January 2024, Maynard was appointed head coach of League Two club Notts County, following the departure of Luke Williams. Maynard was joined by both Matthew Saunders and first-team coach Craig Saunders. Following defeat in the play-off semi-final against AFC Wimbledon, Maynard was dismissed on 22 May 2025. In a statement the owners said: "While football is a game of fine margins, and Stuart undoubtedly faced numerous challenges over the course of the campaign, neither results nor performances reached the levels we believe the team was capable of – particularly during the defining period towards the end."

=== York City ===
On 28 August 2025, Maynard was appointed manager of National League club York City. On 25 April 2026, Maynard won the National League title with York after a 1–1 draw with fellow promotion-chasing side Rochdale, which included an equaliser from Josh Stones in the 13th minute of added time. He was later named National League Manager of the Season for the 2025–26 season. On 26 July 2026, York City announced that Maynard had been let go by the club.

== Managerial statistics ==
As of match played 25 April 2026

Managerial record by team and tenure
Team	From	To	Record					Ref.
Team	From	To	P	W	D	L	Win %	Ref.
Wealdstone	2 February 2021	18 January 2024	147	45	33	69	30.6	
Notts County	18 January 2024	22 May 2025	73	28	16	29	38.4	
York City	28 August 2025	26 July 2026	45	33	7	5	73.3	
Total			265	106	56	103	40.0	

== Honours ==
=== Manager ===
York City

- National League: 2025–26

Individual

- National League Manager of the Season: 2025–26
- National League Manager of the Month: November 2025, January 2026
