= Josh Stones =

English footballer (born 2003)

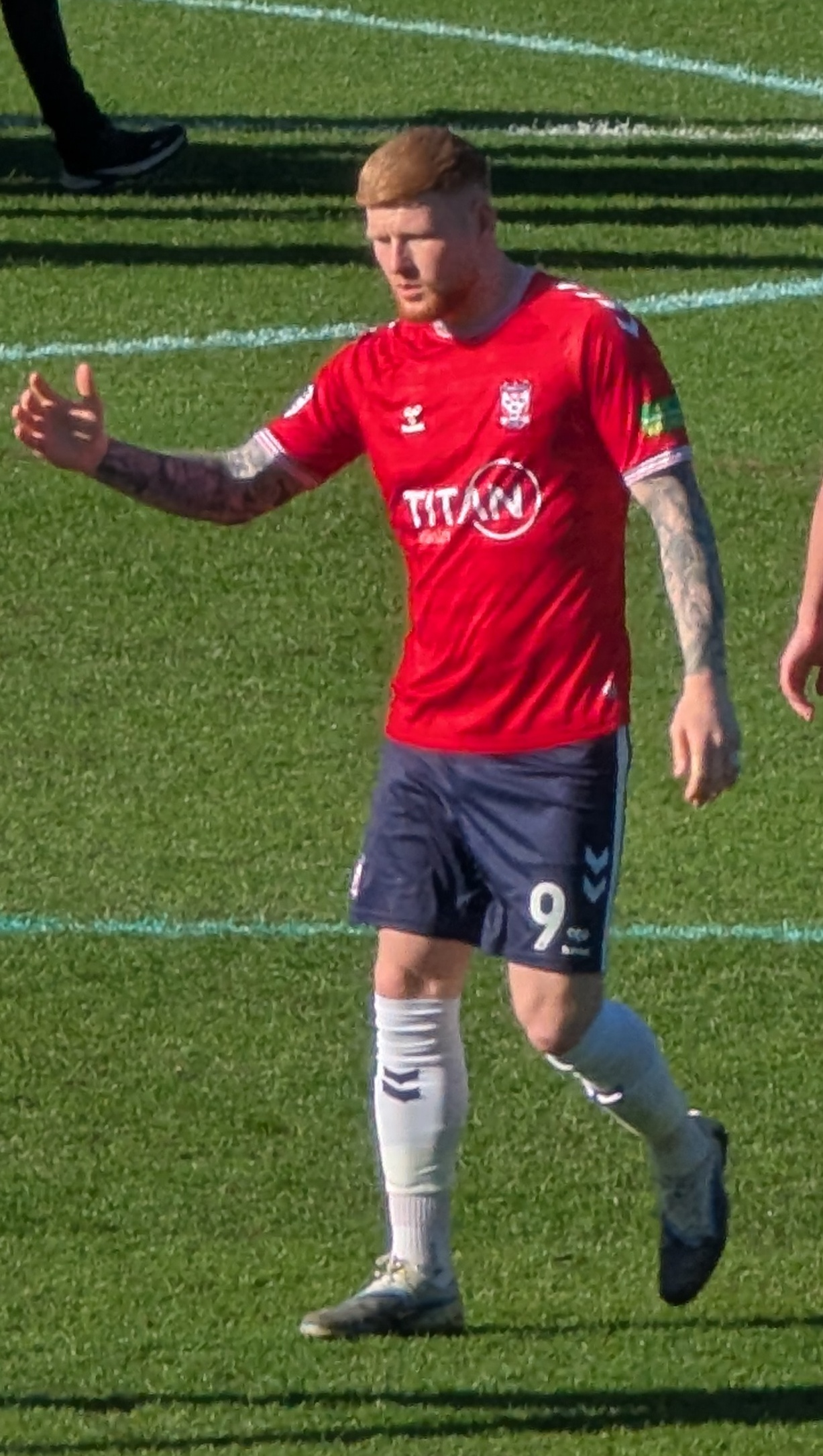
- Stones in 2026

Personal information
- Full name: Josh David Stones
- Date of birth: 12 November 2003 (age 23)
- Place of birth: Leeds, West Yorkshire, England
- Height: 5 ft 11 in (1.81 m)
- Position: Striker

Team information
- Current team: York City
- Number: 9

Youth career
- –2021: Guiseley

Senior career*
Years	Team	Apps	(Gls)
2021–2022	Guiseley	22	(1)
2022–2025	Wigan Athletic	9	(0)
2023	→ Ross County (loan)	6	(0)
2023–2024	→ Oldham Athletic (loan)	4	(3)
2024–2025	→ Oldham Athletic (loan)	6	(4)
2025–	York City	66	(24)
- * Club domestic league appearances and goals as of 14:32, 22 November 2026 (UTC)

Josh David Stones (born 12 November 2003) is an English professional footballer who plays as a striker for EFL League Two club York City.

Stones began his career with Guiseley, before moving to Wigan Athletic. He had loan spells at Ross County and Oldham Athletic before transferring to York City in January 2025.

== Career ==
Stones was born in Leeds, West Yorkshire, and began his career with Guiseley. He was selected for England Schools while with Guiseley, before signing for Wigan Athletic in summer 2022. He moved on loan to Ross County in January 2023.

Stones signed a new three-year contract with Wigan in July 2023.

Stones scored his first Wigan Athletic goal on 19 September 2023, in a 7–1 home victory against Leicester City Academy in the EFL Trophy.

Stones moved on loan to Oldham Athletic in December 2023. The loan ended in January 2024 after Stones suffered an injury. On 5 November 2024, he returned to the club on loan until 2 January 2025.

After his loan ended in January 2025, he transferred to York City for an undisclosed fee. On 25 April 2026, he netted a dramatic goal in the 13th minute of stoppage time to earn a 1–1 away draw against Rochdale, a result that confirmed his club's promotion to EFL League Two.

== Career statistics ==
As of match played 21 November 2026

Appearances and goals by club, season and competition
Club	Season	League			National cup (Note: Includes FA Cup)		League cup (Note: Includes EFL Cup)		Other		Total	
Club	Season	Division	Apps	Goals	Apps	Goals	Apps	Goals	Apps	Goals	Apps	Goals
Guiseley	2021–22	National League North	22	1	0	0	–		1 (Note: Appearance in FA Trophy)	0	23	1
Wigan Athletic	2022–23	Championship	0	0	0	0	1	0	–		1	0
Wigan Athletic	2023–24	League One	6	0	0	0	0	0	3 (Note: Appearances in EFL Trophy)	2	9	2
Wigan Athletic	2024–25	League One	3	0	0	0	1	0	2	1	6	1
Wigan Athletic	Total		9	0	0	0	2	0	5	3	16	3
Ross County (loan)	2022–23	Scottish Premiership	6	0	0	0	0	0	–		6	0
Oldham Athletic (loan)	2023–24	National League	4	3	0	0	–		0	0	4	3
Oldham Athletic (loan)	2024–25	National League	6	4	0	0	–		2 (Note: One appearance and one goal in National League Cup, one appearance in FA Trophy)	1	8	5
York City	2024–25	National League	21	7	0	0	–		1 (Note: Appearance in National League play-offs)	0	22	7
York City	2025–26	National League	40	17	2	1	–		1	0	43	18
York City	2026–27	League Two	5	0	1	1	0	0	0	0	6	1
York City	Total		66	24	3	2	0	0	2	0	71	26
Career total			113	32	3	2	2	0	10	4	128	38

== Honours ==
York City

- National League: 2025–26
