= Harrison Male =

English footballer (born 2000)

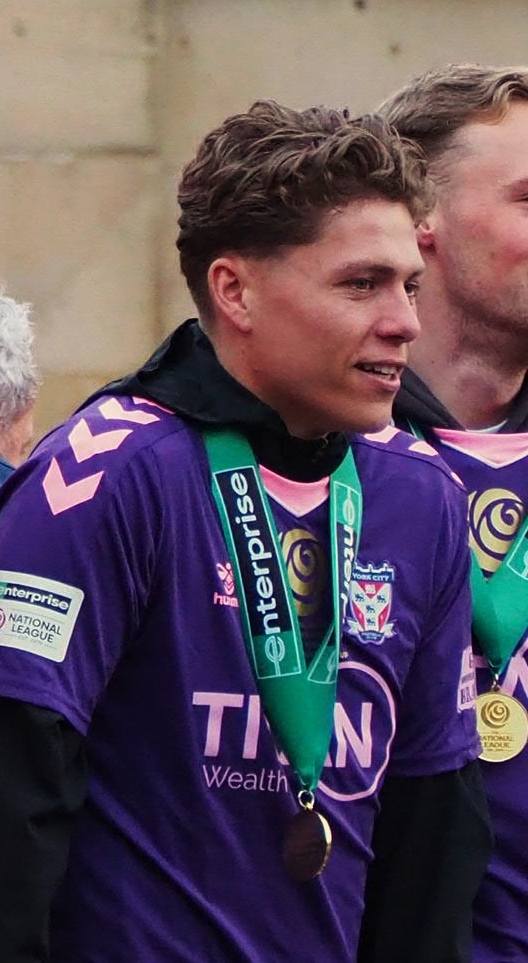
- Male in 2026

Personal information
- Full name: Harrison Darren Male
- Date of birth: 13 September 2000 (age 26)
- Place of birth: Bridlington, East Riding of Yorkshire, England
- Height: 6 ft 1 in (1.85 m)
- Position: Goalkeeper

Team information
- Current team: Tranmere Rovers
- Number: 12

Youth career
- 2008–2018: Leeds United

Senior career*
| Years | Team | Apps | (Gls) |
| 2018–2020 | Leeds United | 0 | (0) |
| 2018–2019 | → Tadcaster Albion (loan) | | |
| 2020–2021 | Gateshead | 5 | (0) |
| 2021–2023 | Worthing | 86 | (0) |
| 2023–2024 | Dorking Wanderers | 45 | (0) |
| 2024–2026 | York City | 87 | (0) |
| 2026– | Tranmere Rovers | 7 | (0) |

International career
| 2015–2016 | England U16 | 4 | (0) |
| 2023 | England C | 1 | (0) |
- * Club domestic league appearances and goals as of 12:48, 24 October 2026 (UTC)

Harrison Darren Male (born 13 September 2000) is an English professional footballer who plays as a goalkeeper for EFL League Two club Tranmere Rovers.

Male started his career at Leeds United after progressing through their academy. He spent time on loan at Tadcaster Albion before signing for Gateshead in 2020.

== Early life ==
Harrison Darren Male was born on 13 September 2000 in Bridlington, East Riding of Yorkshire.

== Career ==
=== Leeds United ===
Male came through the academy at Leeds United. Having failed to make an appearance, Male joined Northern Premier League club Tadcaster Albion on 13 August 2018 on a season-long loan. He made his debut in Tadcaster's first match of the 2018–19 Northern Premier League Division One East season, a 2–0 defeat at home to Carlton Town on 18 August.

=== Gateshead ===
Male signed for National League North club Gateshead permanently on 2 October 2020 on a one-year contract after being released by Leeds United.

=== Worthing ===
Upon the expiry of his contract, Male joined National League South club Worthing, reaching the play-offs in the 2022/23 season after a 4th-placed finish.

=== Dorking Wanderers ===
On 1 July 2023, Male joined National League club Dorking Wanderers signing a two-year deal, where he was named player of the month in both of the first two months of the 2023/24 season.

=== York City ===
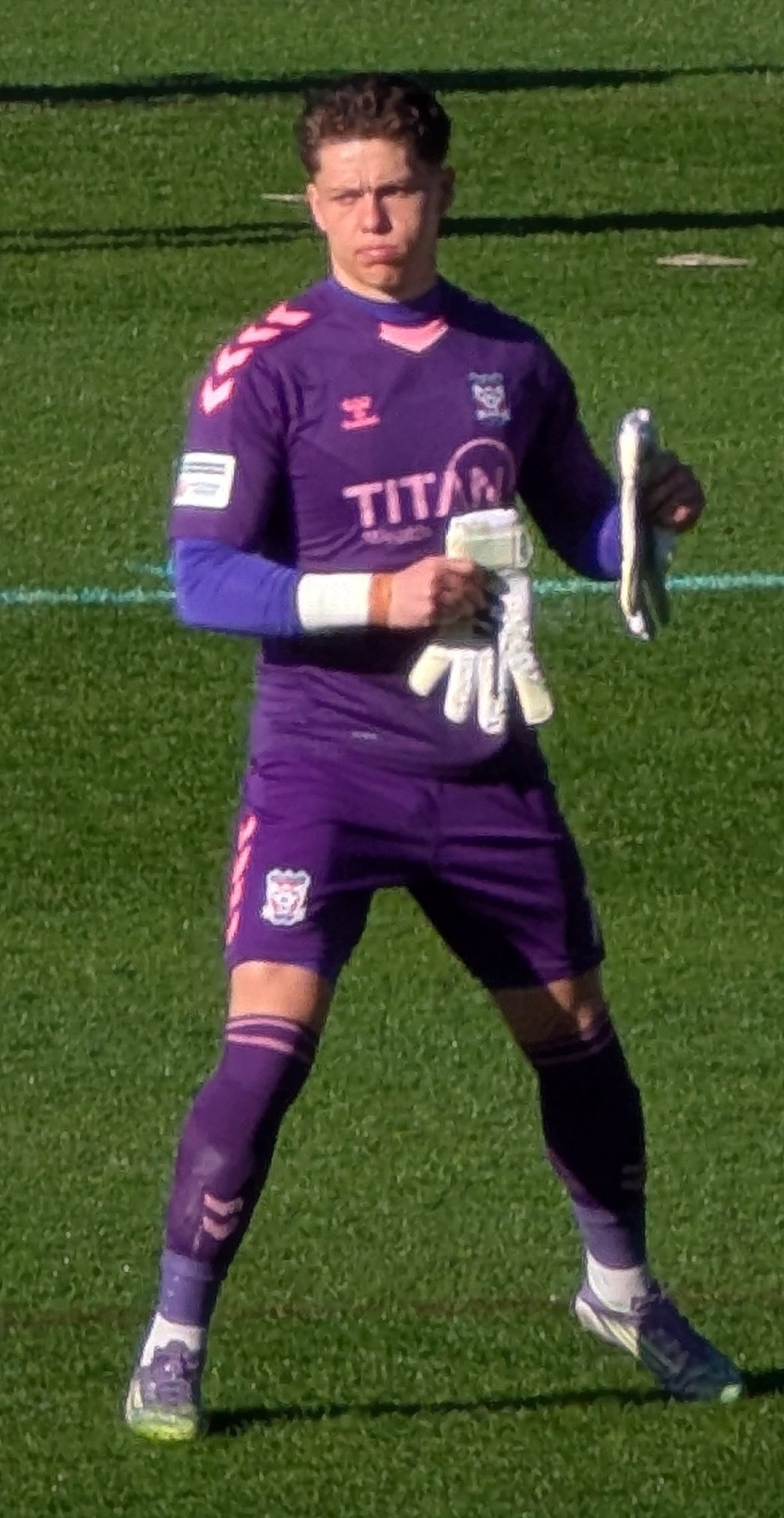
Male with York City in 2026

Male was again on the move in the summer of 2024, signing for rival National League club York City on a two-year contract. After consecutive golden glove awards for most clean sheets in the National League, and helping York to promotion at the culmination of the 2025/26 season, Male was released upon the expiration of his contract.

=== Tranmere Rovers ===
On 28 July 2026, Male joined EFL League Two club Tranmere Rovers on a one-year contract.

== Career statistics ==
As of match played 17 October 2026

Appearances and goals by club, season and competition
| Club | Season | League | | | FA Cup | | EFL Cup | | Other | | Total | |
| Club | Season | Division | Apps | Goals | Apps | Goals | Apps | Goals | Apps | Goals | Apps | Goals |
|---|---|---|---|---|---|---|---|---|---|---|---|---|
| Gateshead | 2020–21 | National League North | 5 | 0 | 0 | 0 | — | | 1 (Note: Appearance(s) in FA Trophy) | 0 | 6 | 0 |
| Worthing | 2021–22 | Isthmian League Premier Division | 41 | 0 | 2 | 0 | — | | 10 (Note: Three appearances in FA Trophy, five appearances in Sussex Senior Cup, two appearances in Alan Turvey Trophy) | 0 | 53 | 0 |
| Worthing | 2022–23 | National League South | 45 | 0 | 2 | 0 | — | | 6 (Note: Two appearances in FA Trophy, three appearances in Sussex Senior Cup, one appearance in National League South play-offs) | 0 | 53 | 0 |
| Worthing | Total | | 86 | 0 | 4 | 0 | — | | 16 | 0 | 106 | 0 |
| Dorking Wanderers | 2023–24 | National League | 45 | 0 | 1 | 0 | — | | 2 | 0 | 48 | 0 |
| York City | 2024–25 | National League | 41 | 0 | 1 | 0 | — | | 2 (Note: One appearance in FA Trophy, one appearance in National League play-offs) | 0 | 44 | 0 |
| York City | 2025–26 | National League | 46 | 0 | 2 | 0 | — | | 0 | 0 | 48 | 0 |
| York City | Total | | 87 | 0 | 3 | 0 | — | | 2 | 0 | 92 | 0 |
| Tranmere Rovers | 2026–27 | League Two | 7 | 0 | 0 | 0 | 1 | 0 | 0 | 0 | 8 | 0 |
| Career total | | | 230 | 0 | 8 | 0 | 1 | 0 | 21 | 0 | 260 | 0 |

== Honours ==
Worthing

- Isthmian League Premier Division: 2021–22

York City

- National League: 2025–26

Individual

- National League Golden Glove: 2024–25, 2025–26
