= Zak Johnson =

English footballer (born 2004)

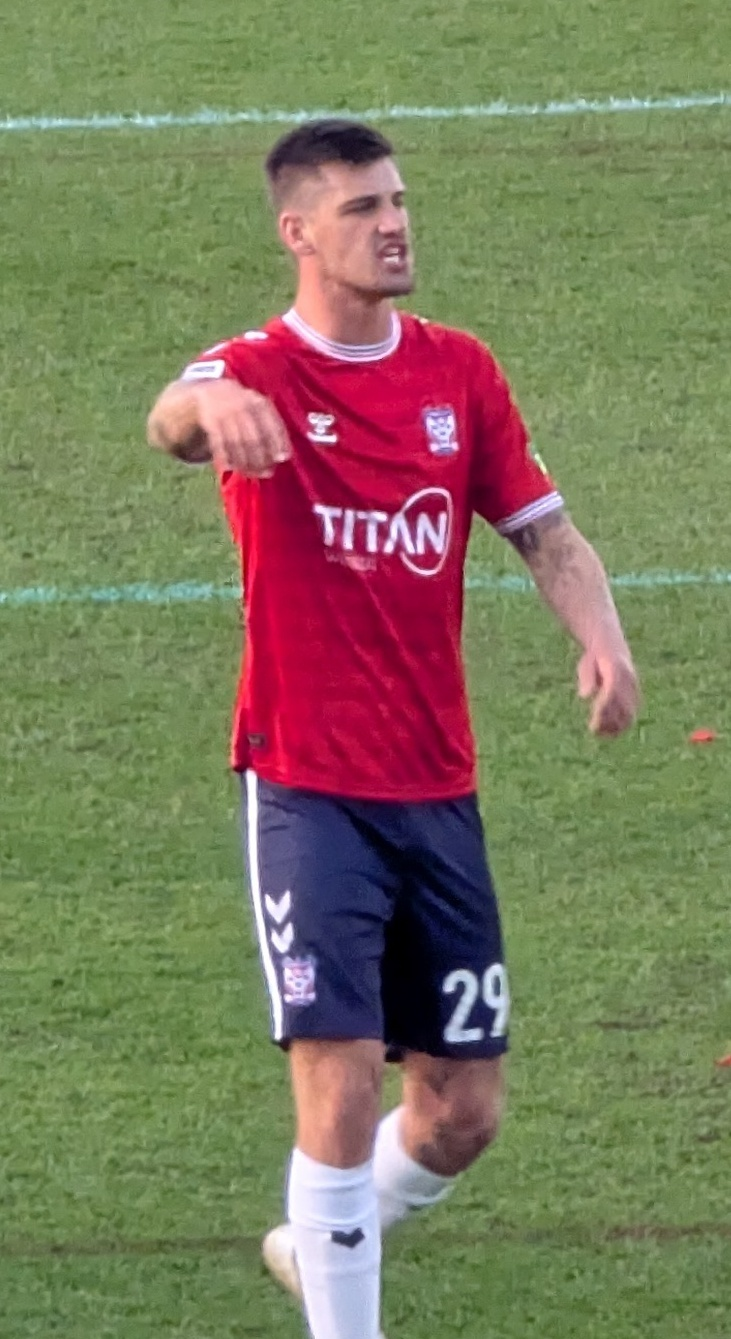
- Johnson in 2026

Personal information
- Full name: Zak Robert Johnson
- Date of birth: 25 May 2005 (age 21)
- Place of birth: Sunderland, Tyne and Wear, England
- Height: 6 ft 2 in (1.88 m)
- Position: Centre-back

Team information
- Current team: York City
- Number: 5

Youth career
- 2020–2022: Sunderland

Senior career*
Years	Team	Apps	(Gls)
2021–2026	Sunderland	0	(0)
2023–2024	→ Hartlepool United (loan)	11	(0)
2024	→ Dundalk (loan)	18	(0)
2025	→ Notts County (loan)	10	(0)
2025–2026	→ York City (loan)	25	(1)
2026–	York City	0	(0)

International career^{‡}
2023	England U18	2	(0)
- * Club domestic league appearances and goals as of 00:21, 26 April 2026 (UTC) ‡ National team caps and goals as of 09:00, 23 September 2023 (UTC)

Zak Robert Johnson (born 25 May 2005) is an English professional footballer who plays as a centre-back for EFL League Two club York City.

== Club career ==
Johnson began his playing career at his hometown club Sunderland and made his first appearance in the EFL Trophy on 13 October 2021 coming on as a substitute in a 2–1 victory against Manchester United U21s. At 16 years and 141 days old, this appearance made Zak the youngest outfield player to play for Sunderland in almost 50 years.

On 1 July 2022, it was announced Johnson had signed his first professional contract with Sunderland on a deal lasting until 2025.

On 8 August 2023, Johnson made his first start for Sunderland in an EFL Cup defeat against Crewe Alexandra. A month later, he signed a new deal until 2026.

Johnson moved to National League side Hartlepool United in September 2023 on a one-month loan deal. On 26 October, this loan deal was extended until January 2024. On 5 January 2024, it was announced that Johnson's loan spell with Hartlepool had ended.

On 14 February 2024, Johnson signed for League of Ireland Premier Division club Dundalk on loan. Johnson won the Supporters' Club Player of the Month for March 2024. He returned to Sunderland in June 2024. Johnson said of his loan spell: "I have loved every minute of my time here. The lessons in maturity and self-development have been so valuable, they will stay with me for the rest of my life."

On 13 January 2025, Johnson signed for League Two side Notts County on loan until the end of the season.

In November 2025, Johnson joined National League club York City on a short-term loan until January 2026. In January 2026, his loan deal with York was extended until the end of the season. In June 2026, it was announced this had been made a permanent signing.

== International career ==
In June 2023, Johnson received a call-up to the England U18s squad for an upcoming trip to Portugal.

== Career statistics ==
As of end of 2025–26 season

Appearances and goals by club, season and competition
Club	Season	League			FA Cup		EFL Cup		Other		Total	
Club	Season	Division	Apps	Goals	Apps	Goals	Apps	Goals	Apps	Goals	Apps	Goals
Sunderland	2021–22	League One	0	0	0	0	0	0	1 (Note: Appearance in EFL Trophy)	0	1	0
Sunderland	2022–23	Championship	0	0	0	0	0	0	0	0	0	0
Sunderland	2023–24	Championship	0	0	0	0	1	0	0	0	1	0
Sunderland	2024–25	Championship	0	0	1	0	1	0	0	0	2	0
Sunderland	2025–26	Premier League	0	0	0	0	0	0	0	0	0	0
Sunderland	Total		0	0	1	0	2	0	1	0	4	0
Hartlepool United (loan)	2023–24	National League	11	0	1	0	0	0	0	0	12	0
Dundalk (loan)	2024	League of Ireland Premier Division	18	0	0	0	0	0	0	0	18	0
Notts County (loan)	2024–25	League Two	10	0	0	0	0	0	0	0	10	0
York City (loan)	2025–26	National League	25	1	0	0	0	0	0	0	25	1
York City	2026–27	League Two	0	0	0	0	0	0	0	0	0	0
Career total			64	1	2	0	2	0	1	0	69	1

== Honours ==
York City

- National League: 2025–26
