= 2021–22 Coventry City F.C. season =

Coventry City
2021–22 season
- Chairman: Tim Fisher
- Manager: Mark Robins
- Stadium: Coventry Building Society Arena
- Championship: 12th
- FA Cup: Fourth round vs Southampton
- EFL Cup: First round vs Northampton Town
- Top goalscorer: League: Viktor Gyökeres (17); All: Viktor Gyökeres (18)
- Biggest win: 3–0 vs. Peterborough United (Championship, 24 September 2021); 4–1 vs. Fulham (Championship, 2 October 2021); 4–1 vs. Peterborough United (Championship, 15 January 2022); 4–1 vs. Sheffield United (Championship, 12 March 2022)
- Biggest defeat: 5–0 vs. Luton Town (Championship, 29 September 2021)
Home colours	Away colours	Third colours
- All statistics correct as of 7 May 2022.

The 2021–22 season is Coventry City's 138th season in their history and the second consecutive season in the EFL Championship. It is also the first season back at the Coventry Building Society Arena after 2 seasons in Birmingham. Alongside the Championship, the club will participate in the FA Cup and EFL Cup.

The season covers the period from 7 August 2021 to 29 May 2022.

== Pre-season ==
Coventry City announced they would play friendlies against Sevilla, Cheltenham Town, Mansfield Town, Norwich City, Gloucester City, Wolverhampton Wanderers and Nuneaton Borough as part of their pre-season preparations.

16 July 2021 Friendly	Sevilla	4–0	Coventry City	Murcia, Spain
19:00 CEST	Pask 5' (o.g.); Idrissi 50'; Romero 67', 75'	Report		Stadium: Pinatar Arena; Attendance: 0 (Behind-closed-doors)

21 July 2021 Friendly	Milton Keynes Dons	2–1	Coventry City	Barton-under-Needwood
BST	Bird (?); Twine (?)	Report	Dinanga (?)	Stadium: St George's Park National Football Centre; Attendance: 0 (Behind-closed-doors)

21 July 2021 Friendly	Milton Keynes Dons	5–0	Coventry City	Barton-under-Needwood
BST	Bird (?); Watters (?); O'Riley (?); Darling (?)	Report		Stadium: St George's Park National Football Centre; Attendance: 0 (Behind-closed-doors)

24 July 2021 Friendly	Cheltenham Town	2–0	Coventry City	Cheltenham
15:00 BST	Williams 24', 86'	Report		Stadium: Jonny-Rocks Stadium

27 July 2021 Friendly	Mansfield Town	1–0	Coventry City	Mansfield
19:00 BST	Lapslie 48'	Report		Stadium: One Call Stadium; Attendance: 2,539

28 July 2021 Friendly	Coventry City	Cancelled	Norwich City	Whittington Moor
18:00 BST				Stadium: Technique Stadium
Note: Match was cancelled due to positive COVID-19 cases amongst the Norwich squad.

31 July 2021 Friendly	Gloucester City	4–1	Coventry City XI	Hempsted
15:00 BST	Young (?); Trialist (?); King (?)	Report	(?)	Stadium: New Meadow Park; Attendance: 694

1 August 2021 Friendly	Coventry City	1–2	Wolverhampton Wanderers	Coventry
13:00 BST	Waghorn 57' (pen.)		Silva 7'; Neves 55'	Stadium: Coventry Building Society Arena

3 August 2021 Friendly	Nuneaton Borough	0–5	Coventry City XI	Nuneaton
19:45 BST		Report	Reid; Burroughs; Tavares x2 McGrath	Stadium: Liberty Way; Attendance: 902

== Competitions ==
=== EFL Championship ===
==== League table ====
Pos	Team	Pld	W	D	L	GF	GA	GD	Pts
9	Millwall	46	18	15	13	53	45	+8	69
10	West Bromwich Albion	46	18	13	15	52	45	+7	67
11	Queens Park Rangers	46	19	9	18	60	59	+1	66
12	Coventry City	46	17	13	16	60	59	+1	64
13	Preston North End	46	16	16	14	52	56	−4	64
14	Stoke City	46	17	11	18	57	52	+5	62
15	Swansea City	46	16	13	17	58	68	−10	61

Source: EFL Official Website
Rules for classification: 1) Points; 2) Goal difference; 3) Number of goals scored; 4) Head-to-head results; 5) Wins; 6) Away goals; 7) Penalty points (sec 9.5); 8) 12-point sending off offences

==== Results summary ====
Overall								Home						Away					
Pld	W	D	L	GF	GA	GD	Pts	W	D	L	GF	GA	GD	W	D	L	GF	GA	GD
46	17	13	16	60	59	+1	64	10	5	8	32	26	+6	7	8	8	28	33	−5

Last updated: 7 May 2022.
Source: BBC

==== Results by matchday ====
Matchday	1	2	3	4	5	6	7	8	9	10	11	12	13	14	15	16	17	18	19	20	21	22	23	24	25	26	27	28	29	30	31	32	33	34	35	36	37	38	39	40	41	42	43	44	45	46
Ground	H	A	A	H	A	H	H	A	H	A	H	A	A	H	A	H	H	A	H	A	H	A	H	A	H	H	A	H	A	A	H	A	H	A	H	H	H	A	H	A	A	A	H	A	H	A
Result	W	L	W	W	L	W	W	D	W	L	W	D	L	D	W	L	W	D	D	D	L	D	L	W	L	W	L	D	W	L	W	W	D	L	L	W	L	D	D	L	W	W	L	D	L	D
Position	5	14	8	4	7	6	4	4	3	4	3	4	4	4	4	4	4	5	4	5	7	7	10	8	10	9	9	12	12	12	10	9	10	11	11	10	11	11	11	12	10	9	11	11	11	12

Updated to match(es) played on 7 May 2022. Source: 11v11 for league tables and fixtures
A = Away; H = Home; W = Win; D = Draw; L = Loss

==== Matches ====
The Sky Blues fixtures were revealed on 24 June 2021.

Win Draw Loss Postponed

8 August 2021 1	Coventry City	2–1	Nottingham Forest	Coventry
16:30 BST	Gyökeres 81'; McFadzean 90+6', (yellow card) 49'; Sheaf (yellow card) 34'; Maatsen (yellow card) 55'; Hamer (yellow card) 61'	Report	Taylor 36', (yellow card) 58'	Stadium: Coventry Building Society Arena; Attendance: 20,843; Referee: James Linington
Note: Live on Sky Sports

14 August 2021 2	Barnsley	1–0	Coventry City	Barnsley
15:00 BST	Frieser 39', (yellow card) 71'; Palmer (yellow card) 50'; Sibbick (yellow card) 68'; Styles (yellow card) 81'; Woodrow (yellow card) 82'; Collins (yellow card) 85'; Benson (yellow card) 87'; Kitching (yellow card) 88'	Report	Dabo (yellow card) 74'; O'Hare (yellow card) 89'; Gyökeres (penalty missed) 90+3'	Stadium: Oakwell; Attendance: 16,961; Referee: John Busby

17 August 2021 3	Blackpool	0–1	Coventry City	Blackpool
19:45 BST	Lavery (yellow card) 6'; Keogh (yellow card) 13'; Connolly (yellow card) 59'	Report	O'Hare (yellow card) 45'; Gyökeres 45+2'; Maatsen (yellow card) 47'; Clarke-Salter (yellow card) 70'; Waghorn (yellow card) 80'	Stadium: Bloomfield Road; Attendance: 11,608; Referee: Keith Stroud

21 August 2021 4	Coventry City	2–1	Reading	Coventry
15:00 BST	Hyam (yellow card) 5'; Maatsen (yellow card) 45+1'; Allen 62'; O'Hare (yellow card) 78'; Sheaf (yellow card) 90+4'; Hamer (yellow card) 90+5'; Godden 90+8'	Report	Swift (pen.), 40'; Dele-Bashiru (yellow card) 50'; Rinomhota (yellow card) 75'; Clarke (yellow card) 90+1'	Stadium: Coventry Building Society Arena; Attendance: 16,464; Referee: David Webb

28 August 2021 5	Queens Park Rangers	2–0	Coventry City	Shepherd's Bush, London
15:00 BST	Johansen (yellow card) 35'; Dykes 68'; Barbet 76'	Report	Clarke-Salter (yellow card) 71'	Stadium: Kiyan Prince Foundation Stadium; Attendance: 14,774; Referee: Dean Whitestone

11 September 2021 6	Coventry City	2–0	Middlesbrough	Coventry
15:00 BST	Hamer (yellow card) 26'; Gyökeres 71'; Waghorn 90+1'	Report	Howson (yellow card) 32'; Bamba (yellow card) 63'; Hall (yellow card) 75'	Stadium: Coventry Building Society Arena; Attendance: 18,515; Referee: Leigh Doughty

15 September 2021 7	Coventry City	1–0	Cardiff City	Coventry
19:45 BST	Gyökeres 15'; Kane (yellow card) 73'; Hamer (yellow card) 90+1'; Dabo (red card) 90+2'	Report	Moore (yellow card) 69'	Stadium: Coventry Building Society Arena; Attendance: 16,372; Referee: Michael Salisbury

18 September 2021 8	Millwall	1–1	Coventry City	Bermondsey, London
15:00 BST	Saville 21' (yellow card) 52'; Wallace (yellow card) 62'	Report	Gyökeres 9'	Stadium: The Den; Attendance: 12,516; Referee: Keith Stroud

24 September 2021 9	Coventry City	3–0	Peterborough United	Coventry
19:45 BST	Hamer 57'; Gyökeres 61', 64'	Report	Butler (yellow card) 44'	Stadium: Coventry Building Society Arena; Attendance: 20,652; Referee: Geoff Eltringham

29 September 2021 10	Luton Town	5–0	Coventry City	Luton
19:45 BST	Adebayo 3' (pen.), 45+7'; Cornick 18', 58'; Berry 30'	Report	Hamer (yellow card) 17'; Maatsen (yellow card) 62'	Stadium: Kenilworth Road; Attendance: 9,805; Referee: Steve Martin

2 October 2021 11	Coventry City	4–1	Fulham	Coventry
12:30 BST	Gyökeres 47', 70'; Godden 51' (pen.); Maatsen 61', (yellow card) 63'	Report	McFadzean 17' (o.g.); Mitrović (yellow card) 66'; Odoi (yellow card) 69'; Robinson (yellow card) 85'	Stadium: Coventry Building Society Arena; Attendance: 18,497; Referee: Gavin Ward

16 October 2021 12	Blackburn Rovers	2–2	Coventry City	Blackburn
15:00 BST	Buckley (yellow card) 28'; Rothwell 39'; Gallagher 45' van Hecke (yellow card) 73'	Report	Walker 62'; Kaminski 68' (o.g.); Kane (yellow card) 79'; Hamer (yellow card) 90+4'	Stadium: Ewood Park; Attendance: 14,110; Referee: Matt Donohue

20 October 2021 13	Preston North End	2–1	Coventry City	Preston
19:45 BST	Hughes (yellow card) 23'; Bauer (yellow card) 50' (goal) 61'; Jakobsen 69'	Report	Walker 45'; Kelly (yellow card) 51'	Stadium: Deepdale; Attendance: 10,837; Referee: Darren England

23 October 2021 14	Coventry City	1–1	Derby County	Coventry
15:00 BST	Godden 20' (pen.); Maatsen (yellow card) 44'	Report	Davies (yellow card) 71'; Shinnie 78'; Morrison (yellow card) 88'	Stadium: Coventry Building Society Arena; Attendance: 23,829; Referee: Dean Whitestone

30 October 2021 15	Hull City	0–1	Coventry City	Kingston upon Hull
15:00 BST	Eaves (yellow card) 53'; Cannon (yellow card) 65'	Report	Godden 9'	Stadium: MKM Stadium; Attendance: 11,901; Referee: David Webb

2 November 2021 16	Coventry City	1–2	Swansea City	Coventry
19:45 BST	Hamer (yellow card) 7'; McFadzean 27'	Report	Paterson 5'; Piroe 12'; Bennett (yellow card) 25'; Downes (yellow card) 83'	Stadium: Coventry Building Society Arena; Attendance: 16,514; Referee: Andy Davies

6 November 2021 17	Coventry City	3–2	Bristol City	Coventry
15:00 BST	Maatsen (red card) 45'; Godden 51' (pen.), 90+2'; McFadzean (yellow card) 63'; O'Hare 74'	Report	Scott (yellow card) 14'; Martin 45+1' (pen.); Weimann 68'; Kalas (yellow card) 81'; Wells (yellow card) 90+1'	Stadium: Coventry Building Society Arena; Attendance: 19,855; Referee: Jeremy Simpson

20 November 2021 18	Sheffield United	0–0	Coventry City	Sheffield
12:30 BST	Egan (yellow card) 22'; Bogle (yellow card) 31'; Hourihane (yellow card) 38'	Report	Hamer (yellow card) 30'; O'Hare (yellow card) 51'	Stadium: Bramall Lane; Attendance: 28,075; Referee: Michael Salisbury

23 November 2021 19	Coventry City	0–0	Birmingham City	Coventry
19:45 BST		Report	Sanderson (yellow card) 54'; Roberts (yellow card) 76'; Woods (red card) 82'; Šunjić (yellow card) 90+2'	Stadium: Coventry Building Society Arena; Attendance: 22,676; Referee: Leigh Doughty

27 November 2021 20	Bournemouth	2–2	Coventry City	Bournemouth
15:00 BST	Anthony 45'; Cook (yellow card) 54'; Billing 66'; Lerma (red card) 68'; Mepham (yellow card) 74'	Report	McFadzean (yellow card) 45+1'; Godden 85'; Kane 90+4'	Stadium: Vitality Stadium; Attendance: 11,094; Referee: David Coote

4 December 2021 21	Coventry City	1–2	West Bromwich Albion	Coventry
12:30 GMT	McFadzean 83'	Report	Grant 20'; Mowatt (yellow card) 35'; McFadzean 43' (o.g.); Johnstone (yellow card) 66'; Kipré (yellow card) 74'	Stadium: Coventry Building Society Arena; Attendance: 23,755; Referee: Keith Stroud

11 December 2021 22	Huddersfield Town	1–1	Coventry City	Huddersfield
12:30 GMT	Ward 18'; Holmes (yellow card) 45+2'; O'Brien (yellow card) 61'	Report	Kelly (yellow card) 45+1'; Godden 90+3'	Stadium: John Smith's Stadium; Attendance: 16,493; Referee: Josh Smith

18 December 2021	Coventry City	v	Stoke City	Coventry
15:00 GMT				Stadium: Coventry Building Society Arena

26 December 2021	Cardiff City	v	Coventry City	Cardiff
15:00 GMT				Stadium: Cardiff City Stadium

29 December 2021 23	Coventry City	0–1	Millwall	Coventry
19:45 GMT	Kane (yellow card) 71'	Report	Bradshaw (yellow card) 56', (goal) 79'	Stadium: Coventry Building Society Arena; Attendance: 18,500; Referee: Geoff Eltringham

1 January 2022	Coventry City	v	Luton Town	Coventry
15:00 GMT				Stadium: Coventry Building Society Arena

15 January 2022 24	Peterborough United	1–4	Coventry City	Peterborough
15:00 GMT	Norburn (yellow card) 8'; Grant 37'; Mumba (yellow card) 41'; Edwards (yellow card) 61'	Report	Hamer 15'; Hyam (yellow card) 24'; Godden 25', 90+1'; Thompson 81' (o.g.)	Stadium: London Road; Attendance: 10,282; Referee: Keith Stroud

22 January 2022 25	Coventry City	1–2	Queens Park Rangers	Coventry
15:00 GMT	Shipley 50'; O'Hare (yellow card) 79'; McFadzean (yellow card) 90+14'	Report	Gray 6'; Dickie (yellow card) 66'; Adomah 88'	Stadium: Coventry Building Society Arena; Attendance: 20,942; Referee: Andy Woolmer

25 January 2022 26	Coventry City	1–0	Stoke City	Coventry
19:45 GMT	Sheaf (yellow card) 30'; Clarke-Salter (yellow card) 53'; Gyökeres 68'	Report	Jagielka (yellow card) 88'	Stadium: Coventry Building Society Arena; Attendance: 16,860; Referee: John Brooks

29 January 2022 27	Middlesbrough	1–0	Coventry City	Middlesbrough
15:00 GMT	Šporar 58'; Taylor (yellow card) 90+1'; Lumley (yellow card) 90+3'	Report	Shipley (yellow card) 64'	Stadium: Riverside Stadium; Attendance: 22,940; Referee: Matt Donohue

8 February 2022 28	Coventry City	1–1	Blackpool	Coventry
19:45 GMT	Sheaf (yellow card) 14'; Hyam (yellow card) 36'; Gyökeres 42'; Clarke-Salter (yellow card) 71'; Hamer (yellow card) 79'	Report	Madine 24'; James (yellow card) 46'	Stadium: Coventry Building Society Arena; Attendance: 15,752; Referee: Andre Marriner

12 February 2022 29	Reading	2–3	Coventry City	Reading
15:00 GMT	João 23'; Yiadom 55'; Hoilett (yellow card) 57' (yellow-red card) 63'; Holmes (yellow card) 84'	Report	Bidwell (yellow card) 14'; Hamer (yellow card) 29'; Hyam (yellow card) 38', (goal) 45+2'; Rose 47'; Maatsen 65', (yellow card) 88'; Sheaf (yellow card) 72'	Stadium: Select Car Leasing Stadium; Referee: David Webb

15 February 2022 30	Cardiff City	2–0	Coventry City	Cardiff
19:45 GMT	Flint (yellow card) 59'; Wintle (yellow card) 60'; Bagan 72'; Harris 87'	Report	McFadzean (yellow card) 78'	Stadium: Cardiff City Stadium; Attendance: 18,660; Referee: John Busby

19 February 2022 31	Coventry City	1–0	Barnsley	Coventry
15:00 GMT	Hyam 90+3'	Report	Quina (yellow card) 69'; Morris (yellow card) 90+9'	Stadium: Coventry Building Society Arena; Attendance: 17,104; Referee: Josh Smith

22 February 2022 32	Bristol City	1–2	Coventry City	Bristol
19:45 GMT	Semenyo (yellow card) 59'; Martin 63'	Report	Maatsen 25'; O'Hare (yellow card) 39'; Hyam (yellow card) 59'; Dabo (yellow card) 82'; Gyökeres 89'	Stadium: Ashton Gate; Attendance: 19,192; Referee: Dean Whitestone

26 February 2022 33	Coventry City	1–1	Preston North End	Coventry
15:00 GMT	Rose (yellow card) 32'; Hamer (yellow card) 69'; Dabo (red card) 86'; Tavares 90+8'	Report	Earl (yellow card) 14'; Lindsay (yellow card) 17' (yellow-red card) 84'; Whiteman (yellow card) 74'; Johnson (pen.), 89'; Evans (yellow card) 90+2'	Stadium: Coventry Building Society Arena; Attendance: 19,743; Referee: Keith Stroud

5 March 2022 34	Swansea City	3–1	Coventry City	Swansea
15:00 GMT	Paterson 12'; Naughton (yellow card) 17'; Obafemi 40', 48'; Cabango (yellow card) 69'	Report	Bidwell (yellow card) 8'; Clarke-Salter (yellow card) 72'; Hamer 84'	Stadium: Swansea.com Stadium; Attendance: 18,405; Referee: Geoff Eltringham

8 March 2022 35	Coventry City	0–1	Luton Town	Coventry
19:45 GMT	Allen (yellow card) 34'; Clarke-Salter (yellow card) 45+1'; McFadzean (yellow card) 87'	Report	Bell (yellow card) 8'; Adebayo 38', (yellow card) 68'; Cornick (yellow card) 60'; Jerome (yellow card) 66'; Burke (yellow card) 73'	Stadium: Coventry Building Society Arena; Attendance: 16,996; Referee: Oliver Langford

12 March 2022 36	Coventry City	4–1	Sheffield United	Coventry
15:00 GMT	Gyökeres 20'; O'Hare 52', 59'; Godden 68'	Report	Berge 16'	Stadium: Coventry Building Society Arena; Attendance: 21,732; Referee: Jeremy Simpson

16 March 2022 37	Coventry City	0–2	Hull City	Coventry
19:45 GMT	Hamer (yellow card) 73'; Maatsen (yellow card) 90+4'	Report	Smallwood 4'; Longman 28'	Stadium: Coventry Building Society Arena; Attendance: 15,587; Referee: John Busby

19 March 2022 38	Derby County	1–1	Coventry City	Derby
12:30 GMT	Byrne (yellow card) 57'; Lawrence 66' (pen.)	Report	Bidwell (yellow card) 22'; Godden 28'; Dabo (yellow card) 54'; Hamer (yellow card) 66'	Stadium: Pride Park Stadium; Attendance: 24,264; Referee: Darren Bond

2 April 2022 39	Coventry City	2–2	Blackburn Rovers	Coventry
15:00 BST	Pickering 8' (o.g.); Maatsen (yellow card) 76'; Gyökeres (yellow card) 78', (goal) 90+9'	Report	van Hecke (yellow card) 37'; Dack 46'; Gallagher (yellow card) 49'; Brereton Díaz (yellow card) 63'; Buckley (yellow card) 68'; Wharton (yellow card) 78', (goal) 82'	Stadium: Coventry Building Society Arena; Attendance: 19,939; Referee: Peter Bankes

6 April 2022 40	Nottingham Forest	2–0	Coventry City	West Bridgford
19:45 BST	Worrall (yellow card) 21'; Johnson 25'; Zinckernagel (yellow card) 54'; Garner 61'; Colback (yellow card) 90+2'	Report	Bidwell (yellow card) 39'; Hyam (yellow card) 77'; O'Hare (yellow card) 90+7'	Stadium: The City Ground; Attendance: 28,977; Referee: Tim Robinson

10 April 2022 41	Fulham	1–3	Coventry City	Fulham
15:00 BST	Wilson (yellow card) 81'; Reid 82'	Report	Ream 20' (o.g.); Gyökeres 24'; Dabo (yellow card) 42'; Sheaf (yellow card) 61'; Moore (yellow card) 65'; Hamer (yellow card) 80'; O'Hare 90+3'	Stadium: Craven Cottage; Attendance: 19,401; Referee: Keith Stroud

15 April 2022 42	Birmingham City	2–4	Coventry City	Bordesley
15:00 BST	Bacuna (yellow card) 4'; Pedersen 12'; Gardner 39'; Roberts (yellow card) 40'; Richards (yellow card) 90+3'; Woods (yellow card) 90+5'	Report	Sheaf 40', 45+4'; Rose 71'; O’Hare 90'	Stadium: St. Andrew's Stadium; Attendance: 17,634; Referee: Oliver Langford

18 April 2022 43	Coventry City	0–3	Bournemouth	Coventry
15:00 BST		Report	Lowe 12'; Solanke 45', 55'	Stadium: Coventry Building Society Arena; Attendance: 24,342; Referee: Matt Donohue

23 April 2022 44	West Bromwich Albion	0–0	Coventry City	West Bromwich
15:00 BST	O'Shea (yellow card) 36'	Report	McFadzean (yellow card) 71'	Stadium: The Hawthorns; Attendance: 22,160; Referee: Steve Martin

30 April 2022 45	Coventry City	1–2	Huddersfield Town	Coventry
15:00 BST	Kane (yellow card) 70'; Gyökeres 90'	Report	Toffolo 45'; Anjorin 79' (pen.)	Stadium: Coventry Building Society Arena; Attendance: 23,828; Referee: Tony Harrington

7 May 2022 46	Stoke City	1–1	Coventry City	Stoke-on-Trent
12:30 BST	Clucas 43'	Report	Gyökeres 14'; Hyam (yellow card) 89'	Stadium: bet365 Stadium; Attendance: 23,086; Referee: Gavin Ward

=== FA Cup ===
Coventry City were drawn at home to Derby County in the third round.

Win Draw Loss

8 January 2022 Third round	Coventry City	1–0	Derby County	Coventry
12:30 GMT	Hyam 42'; Shipley (yellow card) 53'	Report	Jagielka (yellow card) 31'; Ebosele (yellow card) 57'	Stadium: The Coventry Building Society Arena; Attendance: 8,896; Referee: Andrew Madley

5 February 2022 Fourth round	Southampton	2–1 (a.e.t.)	Coventry City	Southampton
15:00 GMT	Armstrong 63'; Walker-Peters 112'	Report	Gyökeres 22'	Stadium: St Mary's Stadium; Attendance: 30,512; Referee: Tony Harrington

=== EFL Cup ===
Coventry City were drawn at home to Northampton Town in the first round.

Win Draw Loss

11 August 2021 First round	Coventry City	1–2	Northampton Town	Coventry
19:45 BST	Walker 13'	Report	Nelson (yellow card) 36'; Etete 52', 70'	Stadium: The Coventry Building Society Arena; Attendance: 5,284; Referee: Ben Speedie

=== Birmingham Senior Cup ===
Coventry City were drawn away to AFC Wulfrunians in the first round.

before 23 October 2021 First round	AFC Wulfrunians	1–2	Coventry City	Castlecroft
19:45 BST	Bishop 44'		Jones 30'; Nee 90'; O’Brien (red card) 85'	Stadium: Castlecroft Stadium; Attendance: 65

== Squad information ==
=== Squad details ===
No.	Name	Position	Nationality	Place of birth	Date of birth (age) *	Club apps *	Club goals *	Signed from	Date signed	Fee	Contract end
Goalkeepers
1	Simon Moore	GK	(England)	Sandown	19 May 1990 (aged 31)	0	0	Sheffield United	3 July 2021	Free	30 June 2024
13	Ben Wilson	GK	(England)	Stanley	9 August 1992 (aged 28)	35	0	Bradford City	1 July 2019	Free	30 June 2023
31	Tom Billson	GK	(England)	Leicester	18 October 2000 (aged 20)	1	0	Academy	1 July 2018	Free	30 June 2023
44	Cian Tyler	GK	(Wales) (England)	Coventry	22 March 2002 (aged 19)	0	0	Academy	10 November 2016	Free	30 June 2023
Defenders
3	Jake Clarke-Salter	CB	(England)	Carshalton	22 August 1997 (aged 23)	0	0	Chelsea	13 August 2021	Loan	30 June 2022
4	Michael Rose	CB	(Scotland)	Aberdeen	11 October 1995 (aged 25)	58	2	Ayr United	1 July 2019	Free	30 June 2023
5	Kyle McFadzean	CB	(England)	Sheffield	20 February 1987 (aged 34)	80	2	Burton Albion	1 July 2019	Free	30 June 2023
15	Dominic Hyam	CB	(Scotland) (England)	Leuchars	20 December 1995 (aged 25)	145	6	Reading	1 July 2017	Free	30 June 2024
16	Josh Pask	CB	(England)	Waltham Forest	1 November 1997 (aged 23)	22	1	West Ham United	1 July 2018	Free	30 June 2022
18	Ian Maatsen	LB	(Netherlands)	Vlaardingen	10 March 2002 (aged 19)	0	0	Chelsea	30 July 2021	Loan	30 June 2022
20	Todd Kane	RB	(England)	Huntingdon	17 September 1993 (aged 27)	0	0	Queens Park Rangers	31 August 2021	Undisclosed	30 June 2023
22	Josh Reid	LB	(Scotland)	Dingwall	3 May 2002 (aged 19)	0	0	Ross County	28 January 2021	Undisclosed	30 June 2024
23	Fankaty Dabo	RB	(England)	Southwark	11 October 1995 (aged 25)	70	0	Chelsea	1 July 2019	Free	30 June 2023
27	Jake Bidwell	LB	(England)	Southport	21 March 1993 (aged 28)	0	0	Swansea City	17 January 2022	Free	30 June 2025
29	Julien Dacosta	RB	(France)	Marseille	29 May 1996 (aged 25)	19	0	Chamois Niortais	6 July 2020	Free	30 June 2023
35	Declan Drysdale	CB	(England)	Birkenhead	14 November 1999 (aged 21)	5	0	Tranmere Rovers	4 January 2019	Compensation	30 June 2023
46	Blaine Rowe	RB	(England)	Coventry	22 March 2002 (aged 19)	0	0	Academy	1 July 2019	Trainee	30 June 2023
50	Jay McGrath	CB	(Republic of Ireland) (England)	Doncaster	15 April 2003 (aged 18)	0	0	Mickleover	17 July 2020	Undisclosed	30 June 2023
	Abel Alabi	CB	(Republic of Ireland)		28 September 2003 (aged 17)	0	0	Waterford	1 January 2022	Undisclosed	30 June 2025
Midfielders
6	Liam Kelly	DM	(Scotland) (England)	Newport Pagnell	10 February 1990 (aged 31)	131	3	Leyton Orient	1 July 2017	Free	30 June 2023
7	Jodi Jones	RW	(England) (Malta)	Bow	22 October 1997 (aged 23)	85	8	Dagenham & Redbridge	10 May 2016	Undisclosed	30 June 2022
8	Jamie Allen	CM	(England)	Rochdale	29 January 1995 (aged 26)	39	2	Burton Albion	1 July 2019	Undisclosed	30 June 2024
10	Callum O'Hare	AM	(England)	Solihull	1 May 1998 (aged 23)	88	7	Aston Villa	15 July 2020	Free	30 June 2024
14	Ben Sheaf	DM	(England)	Dartford	5 February 1998 (aged 23)	32	0	Arsenal	1 July 2021	Undisclosed	30 June 2024
26	Jordan Shipley	CM	(Republic of Ireland) (England)	Leamington Spa	26 September 1997 (aged 23)	149	19	Academy	1 July 2016	Trainee	30 June 2023
28	Josh Eccles	CM	(England)	Coventry	6 April 2000 (aged 21)	21	0	Academy	14 August 2016	Trainee	30 June 2023
32	Jack Burroughs	MF	(Scotland) (England)	Coventry	21 March 2001 (aged 20)	6	0	Academy	7 August 2017	Trainee	30 June 2023
34	Ricardo Dinanga	LW	(Republic of Ireland)	Cork	6 December 2001 (aged 19)	0	0	Cork City	9 July 2021	Compensation	30 June 2023
36	Ryan Howley	CM	(Wales) (England)	Nuneaton	23 November 2003 (aged 17)	0	0	Academy	1 July 2021	Free	30 June 2023
38	Gustavo Hamer	CM	(Netherlands) (Brazil)	Itajaí	24 June 1997 (aged 24)	44	5	PEC Zwolle	3 July 2020	£1,350,000	30 June 2024
43	Marco Rus	MF	(Romania) (England)	Florești	23 January 2003 (aged 18)	0	0	Southampton	17 July 2021	Free	30 June 2023
45	Aidan Finnegan	CM	(England)	Birmingham	18 February 2003 (aged 18)	0	0	Birmingham City	5 October 2020	Free	30 June 2023
49	Aaron Evans-Harriott	MF	(Wales) (England)	Evesham	16 September 2002 (aged 18)	0	0	Cheltenham Town	28 February 2020	Compensation	30 June 2022
	Marcel Hilßner	RW	(Germany)	Leipzig	30 January 1995 (aged 26)	0	0	SC Paderborn	16 July 2020	Undisclosed	30 June 2023
Forwards
9	Martyn Waghorn	CF	(England)	South Shields	23 January 1990 (aged 31)	0	0	Derby County	2 July 2021	Free	30 June 2023
17	Viktor Gyökeres	CF	(Sweden)	Bromölla	4 June 1998 (aged 23)	19	3	Brighton & Hove Albion	9 July 2021	Undisclosed	30 June 2024
19	Tyler Walker	CF	(England)	Nottingham	17 October 1996 (aged 24)	33	8	Nottingham Forest	28 August 2020	Undisclosed	30 June 2023
24	Matt Godden	CF	(England)	Canterbury	29 July 1991 (aged 29)	57	21	Peterborough United	6 August 2019	Undisclosed	30 June 2024
30	Fábio Tavares	FW	(Portugal) (England)	Porto	22 January 2001 (aged 20)	0	0	Rochdale	1 February 2021	Undisclosed	30 June 2023
40	Jonny Ngandu	FW	(England)	Redbridge	25 October 2001 (aged 19)	1	0	Academy	7 August 2017	Trainee	30 June 2022
41	Will Bapaga	LW	(England)	Coventry	3 November 2002 (aged 18)	8	0	Academy	3 August 2019	Free	30 June 2023
	Danny Cashman	FW	(England)	Crawley	8 January 2001 (aged 20)	0	0	Brighton & Hove Albion	6 August 2021	Free	30 June 2024
Left before the end of the season
11	Bright Enobakhare	FW	(Nigeria)	Benin City	8 February 1998 (aged 23)	18	6	East Bengal	12 July 2021	Free	30 June 2023
	Brandon Mason	LB	(England)	Westminster	30 September 1997 (aged 23)	46	0	Watford	6 July 2018	Free	30 June 2022
	Wesley Jobello	RW	(Martinique) (France)	Gennevilliers	23 January 1994 (aged 27)	14	1	Gazélec Ajaccio	1 July 2019	Undisclosed	30 June 2022

* Player age and appearances/goals for the club as of beginning of 2021–22 season.

=== Appearances ===
Correct as of match played on 7 May 2022

No.	Nat.	Player	Pos.	Championship	FA Cup	EFL Cup	Total
1	(England)	Simon Moore	GK	41	1		42
3	(England)	Jake Clarke-Salter	DF	27+2	2		31
4	(Scotland)	Michael Rose	DF	24+5	2	1	32
5	(England)	Kyle McFadzean	DF	35+2			37
6	(Scotland)	Liam Kelly	MF	8+8			16
7	(England)	Jodi Jones	MF	0+9	0+2	1	12
8	(England)	Jamie Allen	MF	29+9	1+1	1	41
9	(England)	Martyn Waghorn	FW	11+16	0+1	0+1	29
10	(England)	Callum O'Hare	MF	43+2	1+1		47
13	(England)	Ben Wilson	GK	5	1	1	7
14	(England)	Ben Sheaf	MF	33+2	2		37
15	(Scotland)	Dominic Hyam	DF	42+1	2		45
16	(England)	Josh Pask	DF			0+1	1
17	(Sweden)	Viktor Gyökeres	FW	41+4	1+1		47
18	(Netherlands)	Ian Maatsen	DF	35+5	1	0+1	42
19	(England)	Tyler Walker	FW	4+15		1	20
20	(England)	Todd Kane	DF	23+6	1+1		31
22	(Scotland)	Josh Reid	DF			1	1
23	(England)	Fankaty Dabo	DF	26+3	1		30
24	(England)	Matt Godden	FW	17+7	1		25
26	(Republic of Ireland)	Jordan Shipley	MF	8+3	1+1	1	14
27	(England)	Jake Bidwell	DF	13+3	1		17
28	(England)	Josh Eccles	MF	3+2	1+1		7
29	(France)	Julien Dacosta	DF	2+2		1	5
30	(Portugal)	Fábio Tavares	FW	0+7			7
31	(England)	Tom Billson	GK				
32	(Scotland)	Jack Burroughs	MF				
34	(Republic of Ireland)	Ricardo Dinanga	MF				
35	(England)	Declan Drysdale	DF			1	1
36	(Wales)	Ryan Howley	MF	0+1		1	2
38	(Netherlands)	Gustavo Hamer	MF	37+2	2		41
40	(England)	Jonny Ngandu	FW				
41	(England)	Will Bapaga	FW				
43	(Romania)	Marco Rus	MF				
44	(Wales)	Cian Tyler	GK				
45	(England)	Aidan Finnegan	MF				
46	(England)	Blaine Rowe	DF				
49	(Wales)	Aaron Evans-Harriott	MF				
50	(Republic of Ireland)	Jay McGrath	DF				
	(Germany)	Marcel Hilßner	MF				
	(England)	Danny Cashman	FW				
	(Republic of Ireland)	Abel Alabi	DF				
Left before the end of the season
11	(Nigeria)	Bright Enobakhare	FW			1	1
	(England)	Brandon Mason	DF				
	(Martinique)	Wesley Jobello	MF				

=== Goalscorers ===
Correct as of match played on 7 May 2022

No.	Nat.	Player	Pos.	Championship	FA Cup	EFL Cup	Total
17	(Sweden)	Viktor Gyökeres	FW	17	1	0	18
24	(England)	Matt Godden	FW	12	0	0	12
10	(England)	Callum O'Hare	MF	5	0	0	5
5	(England)	Kyle McFadzean	DF	3	0	0	3
15	(Scotland)	Dominic Hyam	DF	2	1	0	3
18	(Netherlands)	Ian Maatsen	DF	3	0	0	3
19	(England)	Tyler Walker	FW	2	0	1	3
38	(Netherlands)	Gustavo Hamer	MF	3	0	0	3
4	(Scotland)	Michael Rose	DF	2	0	0	2
14	(England)	Ben Sheaf	MF	2	0	0	2
8	(England)	Jamie Allen	MF	1	0	0	1
9	(England)	Martyn Waghorn	FW	1	0	0	1
20	(England)	Todd Kane	DF	1	0	0	1
26	(Republic of Ireland)	Jordan Shipley	MF	1	0	0	1
30	(Portugal)	Fábio Tavares	FW	1	0	0	1
Own Goals				4	0	0	4
Totals				60	2	1	63

=== Yellow cards ===
Correct as of match played on 7 May 2022

No.	Nat.	Player	Pos.	Championship	FA Cup	EFL Cup	Total
38	(Netherlands)	Gustavo Hamer	MF	14	1	0	15
18	(Netherlands)	Ian Maatsen	DF	9	0	0	9
3	(England)	Jake Clarke-Salter	DF	6	1	0	7
5	(England)	Kyle McFadzean	DF	7	0	0	7
10	(England)	Callum O'Hare	MF	7	0	0	7
14	(England)	Ben Sheaf	MF	6	1	0	7
15	(Scotland)	Dominic Hyam	DF	7	0	0	7
20	(England)	Todd Kane	DF	4	1	0	5
23	(England)	Fankaty Dabo	DF	4	0	0	4
27	(England)	Jake Bidwell	DF	4	0	0	4
6	(Scotland)	Liam Kelly	MF	2	0	0	2
26	(Republic of Ireland)	Jordan Shipley	MF	1	1	0	2
1	(England)	Simon Moore	GK	1	0	0	1
4	(Scotland)	Michael Rose	DF	1	0	0	1
8	(England)	Jamie Allen	MF	1	0	0	1
9	(England)	Martyn Waghorn	FW	1	0	0	1
17	(Sweden)	Viktor Gyökeres	FW	1	0	0	1
28	(England)	Josh Eccles	MF	0	1	0	1
Totals				76	6	0	82

=== Red cards ===
Correct as of match played on 7 May 2022

No.	Nat.	Player	Pos.	Championship	FA Cup	EFL Cup	Total
23	(England)	Fankaty Dabo	DF	2	0	0	2
18	(Netherlands)	Ian Maatsen	DF	1	0	0	1
Totals				3	0	0	3

=== Captains ===
Correct as of match played on 7 May 2022

No.	Nat.	Player	Pos.	Championship	FA Cup	EFL Cup	Total
5	(England)	Kyle McFadzean	DF	27	0	0	27
6	(Scotland)	Liam Kelly	MF	8	0	0	8
15	(Scotland)	Dominic Hyam	DF	7	1	0	8
24	(England)	Matt Godden	FW	4	1	0	5
8	(England)	Jamie Allen	MF	0	0	1	1
Totals				46	2	1	49

=== Penalties awarded ===
No.	Nat.	Player	Pos.	Date	Opponents	Ground	Success
17	(Sweden)	Viktor Gyökeres	FW	14 August 2021	Barnsley	Oakwell	✗
24	(England)	Matt Godden	FW	2 October 2021	Fulham	Coventry Building Society Arena	✓
24	(England)	Matt Godden	FW	23 October 2021	Derby County	Coventry Building Society Arena	✓
24	(England)	Matt Godden	FW	6 November 2021	Bristol City	Coventry Building Society Arena	✓

=== Suspensions served ===
No.	Nat.	Player	Pos.	Date suspended	Reason	Matches missed
23	(England)	Fankaty Dabo	DF	15 September 2021	1 red card	Millwall (A); Peterborough United (H); Luton Town (A)
38	(Netherlands)	Gustavo Hamer	MF	28 October 2021	5 yellow cards	Fulham (H)
18	(Netherlands)	Ian Maatsen	DF	2 October 2021	5 yellow cards	Blackburn Rovers (A)
24	(England)	Matt Godden	FW	8 October 2021	Breach of FA Rule E3	Blackburn Rovers (A); Preston North End (A)
18	(Netherlands)	Ian Maatsen	DF	6 November 2021	1 red card	Sheffield United (A)
38	(Netherlands)	Gustavo Hamer	MF	12 February 2022	10 yellow cards	Cardiff City (A); Barnsley (H)
23	(England)	Fankaty Dabo	DF	26 February 2022	1 red card	Swansea City (A); Luton Town (H)

=== Monthly & weekly awards ===
No.	Nat.	Player	Pos.	Date	Award	Ref
17	(Sweden)	Viktor Gyökeres	FW	9 August 2021	EFL Championship Team of the Week	
1	(England)	Simon Moore	GK	19 August 2021	EFL Championship Team of the Week	
14	(England)	Ben Sheaf	MF	23 August 2021	EFL Championship Team of the Week	
1	(England)	Simon Moore	GK	13 September 2021	EFL Championship Team of the Week	
23	(England)	Fankaty Dabo	DF	13 September 2021	EFL Championship Team of the Week	
17	(Sweden)	Viktor Gyökeres	FW	3 October 2021	EFL Championship Team of the Week	
	(England)	Mark Robins		7 November 2021	EFL Championship Team of the Week	
20	(England)	Todd Kane	DF	30 November 2021	EFL Championship Team of the Week	
24	(England)	Matt Godden	FW	16 January 2022	EFL Championship Team of the Week	
15	(Scotland)	Dominic Hyam	DF	20 February 2022	EFL Championship Team of the Week	
38	(Netherlands)	Gustavo Hamer	MF	24 February 2022	EFL Championship Team of the Week	
	(Trinidad and Tobago)	Dennis Lawrence		13 March 2022	EFL Championship Team of the Week	
10	(England)	Callum O'Hare	MF	13 March 2022	EFL Championship Team of the Week	
17	(Sweden)	Viktor Gyökeres	FW	13 March 2022	EFL Championship Team of the Week	
38	(Netherlands)	Gustavo Hamer	MF	13 March 2022	EFL Championship Team of the Week	
	(England)	Mark Robins		13 April 2022	EFL Championship Team of the Week	
17	(Sweden)	Viktor Gyökeres	FW	13 April 2022	EFL Championship Team of the Week	
38	(Netherlands)	Gustavo Hamer	MF	13 April 2022	EFL Championship Team of the Week	
4	(Scotland)	Michael Rose	DF	16 April 2022	EFL Championship Team of the Week	
14	(England)	Ben Sheaf	MF	16 April 2022	EFL Championship Team of the Week	
38	(Netherlands)	Gustavo Hamer	MF	16 April 2022	EFL Championship Team of the Week	
13	(England)	Ben Wilson	GK	26 April 2022	EFL Championship Team of the Week	

=== End-of-season awards ===
No.	Nat.	Player	Pos.	Date	Award	Ref
36	(Wales)	Ryan Howley	MF	24 April 2022	Championship Apprentice Award	
17	(Sweden)	Viktor Gyökeres	FW	7 May 2022	CCFC Top Goalscorer	
14	(England)	Ben Sheaf	MF	7 May 2022	CCFC Family Zone Player of the Year	
36	(Wales)	Ryan Howley	MF	7 May 2022	CCFC Academy Player of the Season	
18	(Netherlands)	Ian Maatsen	DF	7 May 2022	CCFC Young Player of the Season	
30	(Portugal)	Fábio Tavares	FW	7 May 2022	CCFC Development Player of the Year	
6	(Scotland)	Liam Kelly	MF	7 May 2022	CCFC Community Player of the Year	
6	(Scotland)	Liam Kelly	MF	7 May 2022	PFA Community Champion of the Season	
	(England)	Suzette Johnson		7 May 2022	CCFC Michelle Ridley Award	
10	(England)	Callum O'Hare	MF	7 May 2022	CCFC JSB Player of the Year	
26	(Republic of Ireland)	Jordan Shipley	MF	7 May 2022	CCFC Goal of the Season	
17	(Sweden)	Viktor Gyökeres	FW	7 May 2022	CCFC Players' Player of the Season	
38	(Netherlands)	Gustavo Hamer	MF	7 May 2022	CCFC Player of the Season	

== Transfers ==
=== Transfers in ===
Date	Position	Nationality	Name	From	Fee	Ref.
1 July 2021	DM	(England)	Ben Sheaf	(England) Arsenal	Undisclosed	
2 July 2021	CF	(England)	Martyn Waghorn	(England) Derby County	Free transfer	
3 July 2021	GK	(England)	Simon Moore	(England) Sheffield United	Free transfer	
9 July 2021	LW	(Republic of Ireland)	Ricardo Dinanga	(Republic of Ireland) Cork City	Free transfer	
9 July 2021	CF	(Sweden)	Viktor Gyökeres	(England) Brighton & Hove Albion	Undisclosed	
13 July 2021	FW	(Nigeria)	Bright Enobakhare	(India) SC East Bengal	Free transfer	
17 July 2021	MF	(Romania)	Marco Rus	(England) Southampton	Free transfer	
6 August 2021	FW	(England)	Danny Cashman	(England) Brighton & Hove Albion	Free transfer	
31 August 2021	RB	(England)	Todd Kane	(England) Queens Park Rangers	Undisclosed	
1 January 2022	DF	(Republic of Ireland)	Abel Alabi	(Republic of Ireland) Waterford	Undisclosed	
17 January 2022	DF	(England)	Jake Bidwell	(Wales) Swansea City	Free transfer	

=== Loans in ===
Date from	Position	Nationality	Name	From	Date until	Ref.
30 July 2021	LB	(Netherlands)	Ian Maatsen	(England) Chelsea	End of season	
13 August 2021	CB	(England)	Jake Clarke-Salter	(England) Chelsea	End of season	

=== Loans out ===
Date from	Position	Nationality	Name	To	Date until	Ref.
26 July 2021	GK	(England)	Tom Billson	(England) Scunthorpe United	11 January 2022 (Note: On 11 January, Billson was recalled from his loan spell at Scunthorpe.)	
6 August 2021	MF	(Scotland)	Jack Burroughs	(Scotland) Ross County	End of season	
6 August 2021	FW	(England)	Danny Cashman	(England) Rochdale	End of season	
12 August 2021	LW	(England)	Will Bapaga	(England) Grimsby Town	End of season	
11 January 2022	CB	(England)	Declan Drysdale	(Scotland) Ross County	End of season	
11 January 2022	CB	(England)	Josh Pask	(Wales) Newport County	End of season	
18 January 2022	CF	(England)	Tyler Walker	(England) Portsmouth	End of season	
26 January 2022	RW	(Germany)	Marcel Hilßner	(Germany) FSV Zwickau	End of season	
31 January 2022	RB	(England)	Blaine Rowe	(Scotland) Ayr United	End of season	
1 February 2022	RB	(France)	Julien Dacosta	(Portugal) Portimonense	End of season	

=== Transfers out ===
Date	Position	Nationality	Name	To	Fee	Ref.
24 June 2021	GK	(Slovakia)	Marko Maroši	(England) Shrewsbury Town	Undisclosed	
29 June 2021	CF	(England)	David Bremang	(England) Barnsley	Undisclosed	
30 June 2021	CF	(Sierra Leone)	Amadou Bakayoko	(England) Bolton Wanderers	Released	
30 June 2021	CM	(England)	Daniel Bartlett	(England) Poole Town	Released	
30 June 2021	CF	(France)	Maxime Biamou	(Scotland) Dundee United	Released	
30 June 2021	CM	(Northern Ireland)	Daniel Lafferty	(England) Stratford Town	Released	
30 June 2021	LB	(England)	Joe Newton	(England) Havant & Waterlooville	Released	
30 June 2021	CB	(England)	Jordon Thompson	(England) Gloucester City	Released	
30 June 2021	CB	(England)	Morgan Williams	(England) Yeovil Town	Released	
30 June 2021	MF	(Scotland)	Jordan Young	(England) Gloucester City	Released	
6 July 2021	LW	(Curaçao)	Gervane Kastaneer	(Netherlands) PEC Zwolle	Mutual Consent	
31 August 2021	LB	(England)	Brandon Mason	(England) Milton Keynes Dons	Mutual Consent	
1 November 2021	FW	(Nigeria)	Bright Enobakhare	(Israel) Hapoel Jerusalem	Mutual Consent	
26 November 2021	DF	(England)	Thierry Katsukunya	(England) Aston Villa	Undisclosed	
13 January 2022	RW	(Martinique)	Wesley Jobello	(France) US Boulogne	Mutual Consent	
