= 2020–21 Coventry City F.C. season =

Coventry City F.C.
2020–21 season
- Chairman: Tim Fisher
- Manager: Mark Robins
- Stadium: St Andrew's
- Championship: 16th
- FA Cup: Third round vs Norwich City
- EFL Cup: Second round vs Gillingham
- Top goalscorer: League: Tyler Walker (7); All: Tyler Walker (8)
- Biggest win: 6–1 vs. Millwall (Championship, 8 May 2021)
- Biggest defeat: 4–0 vs. Blackburn Rovers (Championship, 24 October 2020)
Home colours	Away colours	Third colours
- All statistics correct as of 8 May 2021.

The 2020–21 season was Coventry City's 137th season in their history and the first season back in the EFL Championship for 8 years and the club's second and final season at St Andrew's. Alongside the Championship, the club participated in the FA Cup and EFL Cup.

The season covers the period from 1 July 2020 to 30 June 2021.

== Pre-season ==
On 10 July, Coventry City announced they would travel to Scotland to face Scottish Premiership side Rangers in a behind closed doors friendly on July 25. The Sky Blues added a second pre-season friendly against Swindon Town which would also be played behind closed doors on August 15, and a third against Peterborough United on August 29. Two more were later added to the schedule against Wolverhampton Wanderers U23 and Milton Keynes Dons. A further friendly against Burton Albion on 25 August was also confirmed. A final pre-season match against Solihull Moors was also added to the schedule.

25 July 2020 Friendly	Rangers (Scotland)	2–0	Coventry City	Glasgow, Scotland
17:15 BST	Aribo 50'; Goldson 67'			Stadium: Ibrox Stadium; Attendance: 0

15 August 2020 Friendly	Swindon Town	2–1	Coventry City	Swindon
15:00 BST	Smith 22'; Twine 52'	Report	Godden 87' (pen.)	Stadium: County Ground; Attendance: 0

18 August 2020 Friendly	Wolverhampton Wanderers U23	1–1	Coventry City	Lilleshall
13:00 BST	John	Report	Shipley 52'	Attendance: 0

22 August 2020 Friendly	Milton Keynes Dons	2–3	Coventry City	Denbigh
15:00 BST	Bird 41'; McFadzean 60' (o.g.)	Report	Godden 4', 44'; O'Hare 30'	Stadium: Stadium MK; Attendance: 0

25 August 2020 Friendly	Burton Albion	2–3	Coventry City	Burton upon Trent
19:00 BST	Hemmings 18', 58'	Report	Allen 49'; Bakayoko 74'; Jones 89'	Stadium: Pirelli Stadium; Attendance: 0

29 August 2020 Friendly	Peterborough United	1–2	Coventry City	Peterborough
13:00 BST	Broom 72'	Report	Godden 56'; O'Hare 85'	Stadium: Weston Homes Stadium; Attendance: 0

29 August 2020 Friendly	Peterborough United	2–3	Coventry City	Peterborough
15:20 BST	Jones 30'; Eisa 73'	Report	Bakayoko 22', 64'; Jones 60'	Stadium: Weston Homes Stadium; Attendance: 0

1 September 2020 Friendly	Southampton U23	1–3	Coventry City	Southampton
14:30 BST	Vokins 40'		Ngandu 63'; Biamou 76'; Bremang 88'	Stadium: St Mary's Stadium; Attendance: 0

8 September 2020 Friendly	Solihull Moors	2–2	Coventry City	Solihull
19:00 BST	Beesley 67', 87'		Piggott 47' (o.g.); Burroughs 85'	Stadium: SportNation.bet Stadium; Attendance: 0

== Competitions ==
=== EFL Championship ===
==== League table ====
Pos	Team	Pld	W	D	L	GF	GA	GD	Pts
13	Preston North End	46	18	7	21	49	56	−7	61
14	Stoke City	46	15	15	16	50	52	−2	60
15	Blackburn Rovers	46	15	12	19	65	54	+11	57
16	Coventry City	46	14	13	19	49	61	−12	55
17	Nottingham Forest	46	12	16	18	37	45	−8	52
18	Birmingham City	46	13	13	20	37	61	−24	52
19	Bristol City	46	15	6	25	46	68	−22	51

Source: EFL Official Website
Rules for classification: 1) Points; 2) Goal difference; 3) Number of goals scored; 4) Head-to-head results; 5) Wins; 6) Away goals; 7) Penalty points (sec 9.5); 8) 12-point sending off offences

==== Results summary ====
Overall								Home						Away					
Pld	W	D	L	GF	GA	GD	Pts	W	D	L	GF	GA	GD	W	D	L	GF	GA	GD
46	14	13	19	49	61	−12	55	10	7	6	30	22	+8	4	6	13	19	39	−20

Last updated: 8 May 2021.
Source: BBC

==== Results by matchday ====
Matchday	1	2	3	4	5	6	7	8	9	10	11	12	13	14	15	16	17	18	19	20	21	22	23	24	25	26	27	28	29	30	31	32	33	34	35	36	37	38	39	40	41	42	43	44	45	46
Ground	A	H	A	H	A	H	H	A	H	A	A	H	H	A	A	H	H	A	H	A	H	A	A	A	H	A	H	H	A	H	H	A	A	H	H	A	H	A	H	A	A	H	A	H	A	H
Result	L	W	D	L	L	D	L	L	W	L	L	D	W	D	D	W	D	W	D	L	D	L	W	L	W	D	L	D	L	L	W	L	D	L	W	L	D	L	W	L	W	W	W	L	D	W
Position	14	11	13	15	19	18	20	21	18	21	21	21	21	20	19	19	19	18	18	18	18	17	16	18	17	17	18	19	20	20	20	20	20	20	20	20	20	21	20	21	18	18	15	19	17	16

Updated to match(es) played on 8 May 2021. Source: 11v11 for league tables and fixtures
A = Away; H = Home; W = Win; D = Draw; L = Loss

==== Matches ====
Win Draw Loss Postponed

The 2020–21 season fixtures were released on 21 August.

12 September 2020 1	Bristol City	2–1	Coventry City	Ashton Gate
15:00 BST	Paterson 1'; Rowe (yellow card) 14'; Vyner (yellow card) 52'; Kalas 82'	Report	Hamer (yellow card) 12'; Godden 33'	Stadium: Ashton Gate Stadium; Attendance: 0 Referee: John Brookes

18 September 2020 2	Coventry City	3–2	Queens Park Rangers	Birmingham
19:45 BST	Godden 44'; O'Hare 50'; Shipley (yellow card) 60'; McFadzean 84'	Report	Dykes 41' (pen.); Chair (yellow card) 65'; Barbet 75'; Wallace (yellow card) 88'	Stadium: St Andrew's; Attendance: 0 Referee: Steve Martin

26 September 2020 3	Barnsley	0–0	Coventry City	Barnsley
15:00 BST	Woodrow (yellow card) 45'; Styles (yellow card) 80'; Mowatt (yellow card) 85'	Report	Dabo (yellow card) 87'; Hamer (yellow card) 90+1'	Stadium: Oakwell; Attendance: 0 Referee: Josh Smith

2 October 2020 4	Coventry City	1–3	Bournemouth	Birmingham
19:45 BST	Østigård (yellow card) 24'; Godden 39' (pen.); Hamer (red card) 69'	Report	Lerma 7'; Gosling 51', 60' (yellow card) 73'; Smith (yellow card) 68'; Cook (yellow card) 68'	Stadium: St Andrew's; Attendance: 0 Referee: Jarred Gillett

17 October 2020 5	Brentford	2–0	Coventry City	Brentford
15:00 BST	Jensen (yellow card) 43'; Toney 46', 55'	Report	Sheaf (yellow card) 81'	Stadium: Brentford Community Stadium; Attendance: 0 Referee: Andy Woolmer

20 October 2020 6	Coventry City	1–1	Swansea City	Birmingham
19:45 BST	Shipley 19'	Report	Ayew 41'; Bidwell (yellow card) 56'	Stadium: St Andrew's; Attendance: 0 Referee: Keith Stroud

24 October 2020 7	Coventry City	0–4	Blackburn Rovers	Birmingham
15:00 BST	Rose (red card) 14'; Sheaf (yellow card) 74'	Report	Armstrong 15' (pen.), 49' (yellow card) 51'; Douglas (yellow card) 20'; Elliott 62'; Gallagher 88'	Stadium: St Andrew's; Attendance: 0 Referee: Darren England

27 October 2020 8	Middlesbrough	2–0	Coventry City	Middlesbrough
19:45 GMT	Assombalonga 81' (yellow card) 90+1'; Spence (yellow card) 90' (goal) 90+4'	Report	Maroši (yellow card) 90+4'	Stadium: Riverside Stadium; Attendance: 0 Referee: Andy Davies

30 October 2020 9	Coventry City	3–2	Reading	Birmingham
19:45 GMT	Hamer 23' (yellow card) 42'; Østigård (yellow card) 39'; Godden 76'; Rose (yellow card) 80'; Hyam (yellow card) 83'; McCallum 85'; Maroši (yellow card) 87'	Report	João 66'; Pușcaș 90+3'	Stadium: St Andrew's; Attendance: 0 Referee: David Webb

4 November 2020 10	Nottingham Forest	2–1	Coventry City	Nottingham
19:45 GMT	Sow (yellow card) 18'; McKenna 30'; Taylor (pen.), 90+7'	Report	O'Hare 57'; Østigård (yellow card) 85'; McFadzean (yellow card) 90+6'	Stadium: City Ground; Attendance: 0 Referee: Geoff Eltringham

7 November 2020 11	Watford	3–2	Coventry City	Watford
15:00 GMT	Gray 54'; Kiko (yellow card) 62'; Troost-Ekong 66'; Sarr 83' (pen.)	Report	Østigård (yellow card) 55'; Hamer 63'; Walker 64'; O'Hare (yellow card) 83'	Stadium: Vicarage Road; Attendance: 0 Referee: Simon Hooper

20 November 2020 12	Coventry City	0–0	Birmingham City	Birmingham
19:45 GMT	Sheaf (yellow card) 53'	Report		Stadium: St Andrew's; Attendance: 0 Referee: Oliver Langford

25 November 2020 13	Coventry City	1–0	Cardiff City	Birmingham
19:45 GMT	Walker 54'	Report	Morrison (yellow card) 41'; Wilson (yellow card) 85'	Stadium: St Andrew's; Attendance: 0 Referee: Jeremy Simpson

28 November 2020 14	Norwich City	1–1	Coventry City	Norwich
15:00 GMT	Vrančić 27' (pen.); Sørensen (yellow card) 55'; Aarons (yellow card) 90+1'	Report	Biamou 89'	Stadium: Carrow Road; Attendance: 0 Referee: Keith Stroud

1 December 2020 15	Derby County	1–1	Coventry City	Derby
19:45 GMT	Kazim-Richards (yellow card) 11' (goal) 83'; Holmes (yellow card) 63'; Bielik (yellow card) 68'; Clarke (yellow card) 87'	Report	O'Hare (yellow card) 72'; Hamer 90+2'	Stadium: Pride Park; Attendance: 0 Referee: Dean Whitestone

5 December 2020 16	Coventry City	3–1	Rotherham United	Birmingham
15:00 GMT	Biamou 5'; Walker 12'; Smith 72' (o.g.)	Report	Mattock (yellow card) 16'; Olosunde (yellow card) 52'; MacDonald (yellow card) 71'; Barlaser 85' (pen.)	Stadium: St Andrew's; Attendance: 0 Referee: David Webb

8 December 2020 17	Coventry City	0–0	Luton Town	Birmingham
19:45 GMT	O'Hare (yellow card) 38'; Hamer (yellow card) 41'; Kelly (yellow card) 46'	Report	Berry (yellow card) 28'; Potts (yellow card) 81'	Stadium: St Andrew's; Attendance: 0 Referee: Andy Woolmer

12 December 2020 18	Wycombe Wanderers	1–2	Coventry City	High Wycombe
15:00 GMT	Jacobson 61' (pen.); McCleary (yellow card) 71'	Report	Kelly 34', 45+4'; Wilson (yellow card) 61'; Sheaf (yellow card) 72'; Dabo (yellow card) 76'; Biamou (yellow card) 90+3'	Stadium: Adams Park; Attendance: 2,000; Referee: Andy Davies

16 December 2020 19	Coventry City	0–0	Huddersfield Town	Birmingham
20:00 GMT	Hamer (yellow card) 90+1'	Report	Pipa (yellow card) 50'	Stadium: St Andrew's; Attendance: 0 Referee: Tim Robinson

19 December 2020 20	Sheffield Wednesday	1–0	Coventry City	Sheffield
15:00 GMT	Pelupessy (yellow card) 50'; Lees 67'; Reach (yellow card) 79'	Report	Østigård (yellow card) 66'	Stadium: Hillsborough; Attendance: 0 Referee: John Brooks

26 December 2020 21	Coventry City	0–0	Stoke City	Birmingham
15:00 GMT		Report	Thompson (yellow card) 57'	Stadium: St Andrew's; Attendance: 0 Referee: Jarred Gillett

29 December 2020 22	Preston North End	2–0	Coventry City	Preston
19:45 GMT	Johnson 18'; Hughes (yellow card) 31'; Maguire 53' (yellow card) 89'; Earl (yellow card) 63'	Report		Stadium: Deepdale; Attendance: 0 Referee: Keith Stroud

2 January 2021 23	Millwall	1–2	Coventry City	Bermondsey
15:00 GMT	Woods (yellow card) 45+2'; M. Wallace (yellow card) 60' (yellow-red card) 90+3'; J. Wallace 74' (pen.)	Report	Cooper 20' (o.g.); Hamer 26'; Østigård (yellow card) 90+1'	Stadium: The Den; Attendance: 0 Referee: James Linington

16 January 2021	Coventry City	v	Sheffield Wednesday	Birmingham
15:00 GMT				Stadium: St Andrew's

19 January 2021 24	Reading	3–0	Coventry City	Reading
18:00 GMT	João 16', (yellow card) 87'; Holmes (yellow card) 29'; Rinomhota 46'; Swift 72'; Morrison (yellow card) 90'	Report	McDadzean (yellow card) 60' (yellow-red card) 71'; Østigård (yellow card) 80'	Stadium: The Madejski Stadium; Attendance: 0 Referee: Dean Whitestone

23 January 2021	Coventry City	v	Nottingham Forest	Birmingham
15:00 GMT				Stadium: St Andrew's

27 January 2021 25	Coventry City	2–0	Sheffield Wednesday	Birmingham
19:00 GMT	Gyokeres 57'; Hyam (yellow card) 60'; James (yellow card) 87'; Allen 90'	Report	Pelupessy (yellow card) 24'; Penney (yellow card) 50'; Borner (yellow card) 85'	Stadium: St Andrew's; Attendance: 0 Referee: Leigh Doughty

30 January 2021 26	Birmingham City	1–1	Coventry City	Birmingham
15:00 GMT	Bela 18' (pen.); Colin (yellow card) 20'; Sunjic (yellow card) 42'; San Jose (yellow card) 44'	Report	Hamer 29' (yellow card) 72'	Stadium: St Andrew's; Attendance: 0 Referee: Geoff Eltringham

2 February 2021 27	Coventry City	1–2	Nottingham Forest	Birmingham
19:00 GMT	Biamou 17'; O'Hare (yellow card) 53'	Report	Grabban 22'; Rose 53' (o.g.); Knockaert (yellow card) 54'; Krovinovic (yellow card) 74'; Colback (yellow card) 90+2'; Bong (yellow card) 90+13'	Stadium: St Andrew's; Attendance: 0 Referee: Tony Harrington

6 February 2021 28	Coventry City	0–0	Watford	Birmingham
12:30 GMT		Report	Sierralta (yellow card) 24'; Gray (yellow card) 29'	Stadium: St Andrew's; Attendance: 0 Referee: Graham Scott

13 February 2021 29	Cardiff City	3–1	Coventry City	Cardiff
15:00 GMT	Moore 31', 38'; Murphy 46'; Flint (yellow card) 59'; Morrison (yellow card) 80'; Bennett (yellow card) 90+2'	Report	Biamou (yellow card) 58'; Hyam 81'	Stadium: Cardiff City Stadium; Attendance: 0 Referee: James Linington

17 February 2021 30	Coventry City	0–2	Norwich City	Birmingham
19:00 GMT	Dacosta (yellow card) 4'	Report	Hanley (yellow card) 17'; Pukki 28'; Buendia 45+1'; Gibson (yellow card) 70'; Cantwell (yellow card) 84'	Stadium: St Andrew's; Attendance: 0 Referee: Jarred Gillet

20 February 2021 31	Coventry City	2–0	Brentford	Birmingham
12:30 GMT	Walker 19' (pen.), 55'; Hyam (yellow card) 44'; O'Hare (yellow card) 77'	Report		Stadium: St Andrew's; Attendance: 0 Referee: Steve Martin

24 February 2021 32	Swansea City	1–0	Coventry City	Swansea
19:00 GMT	Cabango 54', (yellow card) 87'	Report	McCallum (yellow card) 21'; Østigård (yellow card) 82'	Stadium: Liberty Stadium; Attendance: 0 Referee: Andy Woolmer

27 February 2021 33	Blackburn Rovers	1–1	Coventry City	Blackburn
15:00 GMT	Brereton 27'; Douglas (yellow card) 61'	Report	James 50'; Østigård (yellow card) 69' (yellow-red card) 83'	Stadium: Ewood Park; Attendance: 0 Referee: Darren Bond

2 March 2021 34	Coventry City	1–2	Middlesbrough	Birmingham
19:00 GMT	Dijksteel 11' (o.g.); McFadzean (yellow card) 90+1'	Report	Akpom (yellow card) 31'; Hall 41'; McNair (yellow card) 54'; Saville 87'	Stadium: St Andrew's; Attendance: 0 Referee: Graham Scott

6 March 2021 35	Coventry City	1–0	Derby County	Birmingham
15:00 GMT	Biamou 11'; Hamer (yellow card) 30'; McCallum (yellow card) 88'	Report	Clarke (yellow card) 9'; Buchanan (yellow card) 37'; Knight (yellow card) 49'; Kazim-Richards (yellow card) 57'	Stadium: St Andrew's; Attendance: 0 Referee: John Brooks

13 March 2021	Rotherham United	v	Coventry City	Rotherham
15:00 GMT				Stadium: New York Stadium

16 March 2021 36	Luton Town	2–0	Coventry City	Luton
19:00 GMT	Bree 23'; Adebayo 42' (pen.); Nombe (yellow card) 82'; Pearson (yellow card) 90+3'	Report	McFadzean (red card) 41'	Stadium: Kenilworth Road; Attendance: 0 Referee: Steve Martin

20 March 2021 37	Coventry City	0–0	Wycombe Wanderers	Birmingham
15:00 GMT		Report	Thompson (yellow card) 53'; Stewart (yellow card) 79'	Stadium: St Andrew's; Attendance: 0 Referee: Tony Harrington

2 April 2021 38	Queens Park Rangers	3–0	Coventry City	White City
15:00 GMT	Willock 2'; Rose 22' (o.g.); Chair 68'; Ball (yellow card) 85'	Report		Stadium: Kiyan Prince Foundation Stadium; Attendance: 0 Referee: Jeremy Simpson

5 April 2021 39	Coventry City	3–1	Bristol City	Birmingham
15:00 GMT	Østigård 9'; Godden 63' (pen.); Walker (yellow card) 67'; Kelly (yellow card) 69'; Gyökeres 87'	Report	Diédhiou (yellow card) 31'; Palmer (yellow card) 69'; Wells 79'	Stadium: St Andrew's; Attendance: 0 Referee: Leigh Doughty

10 April 2021 40	Bournemouth	4–1	Coventry City	Bournemouth
15:00 GMT	Danjuma 1', 28'; Brooks 69'; Solanke 90+2'	Report	James 3'; Østigård (yellow card) 75'	Stadium: Vitality Stadium; Attendance: 0 Referee: David Webb

15 April 2021 41	Rotherham United	0–1	Coventry City	Rotherham
19:00 BST	Wing (yellow card) 46'; Wiles (yellow card) 56'; Wood (yellow card) 90+3'	Report	Østigård 70'; Biamou (yellow card) 86'	Stadium: New York Stadium; Attendance: 0 Referee: Jarred Gillett

18 April 2021 42	Coventry City	2–0	Barnsley	Birmingham
15:00 BST	Hyam 9'; Godden 90+2'	Report	Styles (yellow card) 85'	Stadium: St Andrew's; Attendance: 0 Referee: Lee Mason

21 April 2021 43	Stoke City	2–3	Coventry City	Stoke-on-Trent
19:00 BST	Obi Mikel (yellow card) 50'; Brown 58'; Clucas 70'	Report	Walker 44'; Biamou 68'; Østigård (yellow card) 74'; Gyökeres 78'	Stadium: Bet365 Stadium; Attendance: 0 Referee: Oliver Langford

24 April 2021 44	Coventry City	0–1	Preston North End	Birmingham
15:00 BST	Hamer (yellow card) 44'; Dabo (yellow card) 76'; McFadzean (yellow card) 80'	Report	Browne 67' (pen.); Ledson (yellow card) 76'; Evans (yellow card) 90+4'	Stadium: St Andrew's; Attendance: 0 Referee: Andy Woolmer

1 May 2021 45	Huddersfield Town	1–1	Coventry City	Huddersfield
15:00 BST	Keogh (yellow card) 15'; Sarr (yellow card) 73'; Ward 79'	Report	McFadzean (yellow card) 50'; Shipley 69'	Stadium: John Smith's Stadium; Attendance: 0 Referee: Keith Stroud

8 May 2021 46	Coventry City	6–1	Millwall	Birmingham
12:30 BST	Shipley 16'; McFadzean 45+1' (yellow card) 81'; Hyam 59'; O'Hare 62'; James 67'; Walker 84'	Report	McNamara (yellow card) 6'; Evans (yellow card) 45+3'; McFadzean 54' (o.g.); Woods (yellow card) 69'	Stadium: St Andrew's; Attendance: 0 Referee: Michael Salisbury

=== FA Cup ===
The third round draw was made on 30 November, with Premier League and EFL Championship clubs all entering the competition.

Win Draw Loss

9 January 2021 Third round	Norwich City	2–0	Coventry City	Norwich
12:00 GMT	McLean 6', (yellow card) 53'; Hugill 7'; Cantwell (yellow card) 66'; Hanley (yellow card) 87'	Report	Hamer (yellow card) 63'	Stadium: Carrow Road; Attendance: 0 Referee: Darren Drysdale

=== EFL Cup ===
The first round draw was made on 18 August. The second round draw was made on 6 September.

Win Draw Loss

5 September 2020 First round	Milton Keynes Dons	0–1	Coventry City	Denbigh
15:00 BST	Morris (penalty missed) 28'; Kasumu (yellow card) 67'; Cargill (yellow card) 79'; Sørensen (yellow card) 81'; Houghton (yellow card) 90+1'	Report	Drysdale (red card) 27'; Shipley (yellow card) 37'; Walker 82'	Stadium: Stadium MK; Attendance: 0 Referee: Trevor Kettle

15 September 2020 Second round	Gillingham	1–1 (5–4 p)	Coventry City	Gillingham
18:00 BST	Robertson (yellow card) 47'; Graham 90+4' (pen.)	Report	Bapaga (yellow card) 22'; Bakayoko (yellow card) 42'; Biamou 61'; Mason (yellow card) 81'	Stadium: Priestfield Stadium; Attendance: 0 Referee: Craig Hicks
	Penalties
	Ogilvie (penalty scored); Graham (penalty scored); Robertson (penalty scored); Mellis (penalty scored); Coyle (penalty scored)		Walker (penalty scored); Biamou (penalty scored); Sheaf (penalty scored); Rose (penalty missed); Eccles (penalty scored)

== Squad information ==
=== Squad details ===
No.	Name	Position	Nationality	Place of birth	Date of birth (age) *	Club apps *	Club goals *	Signed from	Date signed	Fee	Contract end
Goalkeepers
1	Marko Maroši	GK	(Slovakia)	Michalovce	23 October 1993 (aged 26)	40	0	Doncaster Rovers	1 July 2019	Free	30 June 2022
13	Ben Wilson	GK	(England)	Stanley	9 August 1992 (aged 27)	7	0	Bradford City	1 July 2019	Free	30 June 2022
31	Tom Billson	GK	(England)	Leicester	18 October 2000 (aged 19)	0	0	Academy	1 July 2018	Free	30 June 2023
44	Cian Tyler	GK	(Wales) (England)	Coventry	22 March 2002 (aged 18)	0	0	Academy	10 November 2016	Free	30 June 2022
Defenders
2	Leo Skiri Østigård	CB	(Norway)	Molde	28 November 1999 (aged 20)	0	0	Brighton & Hove Albion	27 August 2020	Loan	30 June 2021
3	Brandon Mason	LB	(England)	Westminster	30 September 1997 (aged 22)	45	0	Watford	6 July 2018	Free	30 June 2022
4	Michael Rose	CB	(Scotland)	Aberdeen	11 October 1995 (aged 24)	40	2	Ayr United	1 July 2019	Free	30 June 2023
5	Kyle McFadzean	CB	(England)	Sheffield	20 February 1987 (aged 33)	40	0	Burton Albion	1 July 2019	Free	30 June 2021
15	Dominic Hyam	CB	(Scotland) (England)	Leuchars	20 December 1995 (aged 24)	100	3	Reading	1 July 2017	Free	30 June 2022
16	Josh Pask	CB	(England)	Waltham Forest	1 November 1997 (aged 22)	4	1	West Ham United	1 July 2018	Free	30 June 2022
21	Sam McCallum	LB	(England)	Canterbury	1 September 2000 (aged 19)	25	2	Norwich City	20 September 2020	Loan	30 June 2021
22	Josh Reid	LB	(Scotland)	Dingwall	3 May 2002 (aged 18)	0	0	Ross County	28 January 2021	Undisclosed	30 June 2024
23	Fankaty Dabo	RB	(England)	Southwark	11 October 1995 (aged 24)	41	0	Chelsea	1 July 2019	Free	30 June 2023
27	Jordon Thompson	CB	(England)	Islington	8 April 1999 (aged 21)	9	0	Academy	1 July 2016	Trainee	30 June 2021
29	Julien Dacosta	RB	(France)	Marseille	29 May 1996 (aged 24)	0	0	Chamois Niortais	6 July 2020	Free	30 June 2023
35	Declan Drysdale	CB	(England)	Birkenhead	14 November 1999 (aged 20)	3	0	Tranmere Rovers	4 January 2019	Compensation	30 June 2023
37	Morgan Williams	CB	(England)	Derby	3 August 1998 (aged 21)	6	0	Mickleover	2 July 2018	Undisclosed	30 June 2021
46	Blaine Rowe	RB	(England)	Coventry	22 March 2002 (aged 18)	0	0	Academy	1 July 2019	Trainee	30 June 2021
48	Joe Newton	LB	(England)	Coventry	2 June 2001 (aged 19)	0	0	Royston Town	2 September 2019	Undisclosed	30 June 2021
50	Jay McGrath	CB	(Republic of Ireland) (England)	Doncaster	15 April 2003 (aged 18)	0	0	Mickleover	17 July 2020	Undisclosed	30 June 2022
Midfielders
6	Liam Kelly	DM	(Scotland) (England)	Newport Pagnell	10 February 1990 (aged 30)	107	1	Leyton Orient	1 July 2017	Free	30 June 2021
7	Jodi Jones	RW	(England) (Malta)	Bow	22 October 1997 (aged 22)	85	8	Dagenham & Redbridge	10 May 2016	Undisclosed	30 June 2021
8	Jamie Allen	CM	(England)	Rochdale	29 January 1995 (aged 25)	16	1	Burton Albion	1 July 2019	Undisclosed	30 June 2022
10	Wesley Jobello	RW	(Martinique) (France)	Gennevilliers	23 January 1994 (aged 26)	11	1	Gazélec Ajaccio	1 July 2019	Undisclosed	30 June 2022
11	Callum O'Hare	AM	(England)	Solihull	1 May 1998 (aged 22)	40	4	Aston Villa	15 July 2020	Free	30 June 2023
14	Ben Sheaf	DM	(England)	Dartford	5 February 1998 (aged 22)	0	0	Arsenal	4 September 2020	Loan	30 June 2021†
17	Marcel Hilßner	RW	(Germany)	Leipzig	30 January 1995 (aged 25)	0	0	SC Paderborn	16 July 2020	Undisclosed	30 June 2023
25	Matty James	CM	(England)	Bacup	22 July 1991 (aged 28)	0	0	Leicester City	6 January 2021	Loan	30 June 2021
26	Jordan Shipley	CM	(Republic of Ireland) (England)	Leamington Spa	26 September 1997 (aged 22)	120	16	Academy	1 July 2016	Trainee	30 June 2022
28	Josh Eccles	CM	(England)	Coventry	6 April 2000 (aged 20)	12	0	Academy	14 August 2016	Trainee	30 June 2023
32	Jack Burroughs	MF	(Scotland) (England)	Coventry	21 March 2001 (aged 19)	3	0	Academy	7 August 2017	Trainee	30 June 2021
33	Gervane Kastaneer	LW	(Curaçao) (Netherlands)	Rotterdam	9 June 1996 (aged 24)	16	1	NAC Breda	1 July 2019	Undisclosed	30 June 2022
38	Gustavo Hamer	CM	(Netherlands) (Brazil)	Itajaí	24 June 1997 (aged 23)	0	0	PEC Zwolle	3 July 2020	£1,350,000	30 June 2023
39	Daniel Bartlett	CM	(England)	Poole	13 October 2000 (aged 19)	1	0	Southampton	1 July 2019	Free	30 June 2021
42	Daniel Lafferty	CM	(Northern Ireland)		22 December 2001 (aged 18)	0	0	Academy	1 July 2018	Free	30 June 2021
45	Aidan Finnegan	CM	(England)	Birmingham	18 February 2003 (aged 17)	0	0	Birmingham City	5 October 2020	Free	30 June 2022
47	Jordan Young	CM	(Scotland) (England)	Chippenham	31 July 1999 (aged 20)	1	0	Swindon Town	16 August 2019	Free	30 June 2021
49	Aaron Evans-Harriott	MF	(Wales) (England)	Evesham	16 September 2002 (aged 17)	0	0	Cheltenham Town	28 February 2020	Compensation	30 June 2022
Forwards
9	Maxime Biamou	CF	(France)	Créteil	13 November 1990 (aged 29)	80	20	Sutton United	1 July 2017	Undisclosed	30 June 2021
12	Viktor Gyökeres	CF	(Sweden)	Bromölla	4 June 1998 (aged 22)	0	0	Brighton & Hove Albion	15 January 2021	Loan	30 June 2021
19	Tyler Walker	CF	(England)	Nottingham	17 October 1996 (aged 23)	0	0	Nottingham Forest	28 August 2020	Undisclosed	30 June 2023
20	Amadou Bakayoko	CF	(Sierra Leone) (England)	Freetown	1 January 1996 (aged 24)	68	13	Walsall	7 August 2018	Undisclosed	30 June 2021
24	Matt Godden	CF	(England)	Canterbury	29 July 1991 (aged 28)	33	15	Peterborough United	6 August 2019	Undisclosed	30 June 2022
30	Fábio Tavares	FW	(Portugal) (England)	Porto	22 January 2001 (aged 19)	0	0	Rochdale	1 February 2021	Undisclosed	30 June 2023
40	Jonny Ngandu	FW	(England)	Redbridge	25 October 2001 (aged 18)	1	0	Academy	7 August 2017	Trainee	30 June 2021
41	Will Bapaga	LW	(England)	Coventry	3 November 2002 (aged 17)	4	0	Academy	3 August 2019	Free	30 June 2023
43	David Bremang	CF	(England)	Hammersmith	21 January 2000 (aged 20)	0	0	Conquest Academy	11 September 2018	Free	30 June 2021
Left before the end of the season
18	Ryan Giles	LB	(England)	Telford	26 January 2000 (aged 20)	1	0	Wolverhampton Wanderers	21 July 2020	Loan	25 January 2021
22	Lee Camp	GK	(Northern Ireland) (England)	Derby	22 August 1984 (aged 35)	0	0	Birmingham City	27 November 2020	Free	28 January 2021

* Player age and appearances/goals for the club as of beginning of 2020–21 season.
† Deal includes option to buy after loan period.

=== Appearances ===
Correct as of match played on 8 May 2021

No.	Nat.	Player	Pos.	Championship	FA Cup	EFL Cup	Total
1	(Slovakia)	Marko Maroši	GK	20		1	21
2	(Norway)	Leo Skiri Østigård	DF	35+4	1		40
3	(England)	Brandon Mason	DF			1	1
4	(Scotland)	Michael Rose	DF	15+2		1	18
5	(England)	Kyle McFadzean	DF	37+1	1	1	40
6	(Scotland)	Liam Kelly	MF	21+2		0+1	24
7	(England)	Jodi Jones	MF				
8	(England)	Jamie Allen	MF	16+6		1	23
9	(France)	Maxime Biamou	FW	20+14	1	0+1	36
10	(Martinique)	Wesley Jobello	MF	0+3			3
11	(England)	Callum O'Hare	MF	40+6	1	1	48
12	(Sweden)	Viktor Gyökeres	FW	7+12			19
13	(England)	Ben Wilson	GK	26+1	1		28
14	(England)	Ben Sheaf	MF	21+9	1	1	32
15	(Scotland)	Dominic Hyam	DF	43	1	1	45
16	(England)	Josh Pask	DF	6+11		1	18
17	(Germany)	Marcel Hilßner	MF				
19	(England)	Tyler Walker	FW	20+11		1+1	33
20	(Sierra Leone)	Amadou Bakayoko	FW	2+12	0+1	1+1	17
21	(England)	Sam McCallum	DF	37+4			41
22	(Scotland)	Josh Reid	DF				
23	(England)	Fankaty Dabo	DF	25+3		1	29
24	(England)	Matt Godden	FW	18+5		1	24
25	(England)	Matty James	MF	19+4	0+1		24
26	(Republic of Ireland)	Jordan Shipley	MF	15+12	1	1	29
27	(England)	Jordon Thompson	DF	0+2		1	3
28	(England)	Josh Eccles	MF	2+5	0+1	1	9
29	(France)	Julien Dacosta	DF	10+8	1		19
30	(Portugal)	Fábio Tavares	FW				
31	(England)	Tom Billson	GK			1	1
32	(Scotland)	Jack Burroughs	MF	0+2		0+1	3
33	(Curaçao)	Gervane Kastaneer	MF	0+2			2
35	(England)	Declan Drysdale	DF			2	2
37	(England)	Morgan Williams	DF				
38	(Netherlands)	Gustavo Hamer	MF	36+6	1	1	44
39	(England)	Daniel Bartlett	MF				
40	(England)	Jonny Ngandu	FW				
41	(England)	Will Bapaga	FW	0+2	0+1	1	4
42	(Northern Ireland)	Daniel Lafferty	MF				
43	(England)	David Bremang	FW				
44	(Wales)	Cian Tyler	GK				
45	(England)	Aidan Finnegan	MF				
46	(England)	Blaine Rowe	DF				
47	(Scotland)	Jordan Young	MF				
48	(England)	Joe Newton	DF				
49	(Wales)	Aaron Evans-Harriott	MF				
50	(Republic of Ireland)	Jay McGrath	DF				
Left before the end of the season
18	(England)	Ryan Giles	DF	15+4	1	1	21
22	(Northern Ireland)	Lee Camp	GK				

=== Goalscorers ===
Correct as of match played on 8 May 2021

No.	Nat.	Player	Pos.	Championship	FA Cup	EFL Cup	Total
19	(England)	Tyler Walker	FW	7	0	1	8
9	(France)	Maxime Biamou	FW	5	0	1	6
24	(England)	Matt Godden	FW	6	0	0	6
38	(Netherlands)	Gustavo Hamer	MF	5	0	0	5
11	(England)	Callum O'Hare	MF	3	0	0	3
12	(Sweden)	Viktor Gyökeres	FW	3	0	0	3
15	(Scotland)	Dominic Hyam	DF	3	0	0	3
25	(England)	Matty James	MF	3	0	0	3
26	(Republic of Ireland)	Jordan Shipley	MF	3	0	0	3
2	(Norway)	Leo Skiri Østigård	DF	2	0	0	2
5	(England)	Kyle McFadzean	DF	2	0	0	2
6	(Scotland)	Liam Kelly	MF	2	0	0	2
8	(England)	Jamie Allen	MF	1	0	0	1
21	(England)	Sam McCallum	DF	1	0	0	1
Own Goals				3	0	0	3
Totals				49	0	2	51

=== Assists ===
Correct as of match played on 8 May 2021

No.	Nat.	Player	Pos.	Championship	FA Cup	EFL Cup	Total
11	(England)	Callum O'Hare	MF	8	0	0	8
25	(England)	Matty James	MF	3	0	0	3
38	(Netherlands)	Gustavo Hamer	MF	3	0	0	3
2	(Norway)	Leo Skiri Østigård	DF	2	0	0	2
9	(France)	Maxime Biamou	FW	2	0	0	2
19	(England)	Tyler Walker	FW	2	0	0	2
21	(England)	Sam McCallum	DF	2	0	0	2
24	(England)	Matt Godden	FW	2	0	0	2
3	(England)	Brandon Mason	DF	0	0	1	1
4	(Scotland)	Michael Rose	DF	1	0	0	1
5	(England)	Kyle McFadzean	DF	1	0	0	1
14	(England)	Ben Sheaf	MF	1	0	0	1
18	(England)	Ryan Giles	DF	1	0	0	1
26	(Republic of Ireland)	Jordan Shipley	MF	1	0	0	1
Totals				29	0	1	30

=== Yellow cards ===
Correct as of match played on 8 May 2021

No.	Nat.	Player	Pos.	Championship	FA Cup	EFL Cup	Total
2	(Norway)	Leo Skiri Østigård	DF	10	0	0	10
38	(Netherlands)	Gustavo Hamer	MF	8	1	0	9
5	(England)	Kyle McFadzean	DF	5	0	0	5
11	(England)	Callum O'Hare	MF	5	0	0	5
14	(England)	Ben Sheaf	MF	4	0	0	4
9	(France)	Maxime Biamou	FW	3	0	0	3
15	(Scotland)	Dominic Hyam	DF	3	0	0	3
23	(England)	Fankaty Dabo	DF	3	0	0	3
1	(Slovakia)	Marko Maroši	GK	2	0	0	2
6	(Scotland)	Liam Kelly	MF	2	0	0	2
21	(England)	Sam McCallum	DF	2	0	0	2
26	(Republic of Ireland)	Jordan Shipley	MF	1	0	1	2
3	(England)	Brandon Mason	DF	0	0	1	1
4	(Scotland)	Michael Rose	DF	1	0	0	1
13	(England)	Ben Wilson	GK	1	0	0	1
19	(England)	Tyler Walker	FW	1	0	0	1
20	(Sierra Leone)	Amadou Bakayoko	FW	0	0	1	1
25	(England)	Matty James	MF	1	0	0	1
29	(France)	Julien Dacosta	DF	1	0	0	1
41	(England)	Will Bapaga	FW	0	0	1	1
Totals				53	1	4	58

=== Red cards ===
Correct as of match played on 8 May 2021

No.	Nat.	Player	Pos.	Championship	FA Cup	EFL Cup	Total
5	(England)	Kyle McFadzean	DF	2	0	0	2
2	(Norway)	Leo Skiri Østigård	DF	1	0	0	1
4	(Scotland)	Michael Rose	DF	1	0	0	1
35	(England)	Declan Drysdale	DF	0	0	1	1
38	(Netherlands)	Gustavo Hamer	MF	1	0	0	1
Totals				5	0	1	6

=== Captains ===
Correct as of match played on 8 May 2021

No.	Nat.	Player	Pos.	Championship	FA Cup	EFL Cup	Total
6	(Scotland)	Liam Kelly	MF	21	0	0	21
5	(England)	Kyle McFadzean	DF	16	1	1	18
15	(Scotland)	Dominic Hyam	DF	3	0	0	3
25	(England)	Matty James	MF	3	0	0	3
24	(England)	Matt Godden	FW	2	0	0	2
4	(Scotland)	Michael Rose	DF	0	0	1	1
23	(England)	Fankaty Dabo	DF	1	0	0	1
Totals				46	1	2	49

=== Penalties awarded ===
No.	Nat.	Player	Pos.	Date	Opponents	Ground	Success
24	(England)	Matt Godden	FW	2 October 2020	Bournemouth	St Andrew's	✓
19	(England)	Tyler Walker	FW	20 February 2021	Brentford	St Andrew's	✓
24	(England)	Matt Godden	FW	5 April 2021	Bristol City	St Andrew's	✓

=== Suspensions served ===
No.	Nat.	Player	Pos.	Date suspended	Reason	Matches missed
35	(England)	Declan Drysdale	DF	5 September 2020	1 red card	Bristol City (A)
38	(Netherlands)	Gustavo Hamer	MF	2 October 2020	1 red card	Brentford (A); Swansea City (H); Blackburn Rovers (H)
4	(Scotland)	Michael Rose	DF	24 October 2020	1 red card	Middlesbrough (A)
38	(Netherlands)	Gustavo Hamer	MF	16 December 2020	5 yellow cards	Sheffield Wednesday (A)
5	(England)	Kyle McFadzean	DF	19 January 2021	1 red card	Sheffield Wednesday (H)
2	(Norway)	Leo Skiri Østigård	DF	27 February 2021	1 red card	Middlesbrough (H)
5	(England)	Kyle McFadzean	DF	16 March 2021	1 red card	Wycombe Wanderers (H); Queens Park Rangers (A)

=== International appearances ===
Date	No.	Pos.	Name	Match	Stats	Caps
4 September 2010	2	CB	(Norway) Leo Skiri Østigård	Norway U21 6-0 Gibraltar U21	45 Minutes	9
8 September 2010	2	CB	(Norway) Leo Skiri Østigård	Netherlands U21 2–0 Norway U21	90 Minutes (yellow card)	10

=== Monthly & weekly awards ===
No.	Nat.	Player	Pos.	Date	Award	Ref
11	(England)	Callum O'Hare	MF	21 September 2020	EFL Championship Team of the Week	
24	(England)	Matt Godden	FW	1 November 2020	EFL Championship Team of the Week	
9	(France)	Maxime Biamou	FW	7 December 2020	EFL Championship Team of the Week	
6	(Scotland)	Liam Kelly	MF	13 December 2020	EFL Championship Team of the Week	
11	(England)	Callum O'Hare	MF	28 January 2021	EFL Championship Team of the Week	
38	(Netherlands)	Gustavo Hamer	MF	28 January 2021	EFL Championship Team of the Week	
5	(England)	Kyle McFadzean	DF	22 February 2021	EFL Championship Team of the Week	
	(England)	Mark Robins		10 May 2021	EFL Championship Team of the Week	
11	(England)	Callum O'Hare	MF	10 May 2021	EFL Championship Team of the Week	
25	(England)	Matty James	MF	10 May 2021	EFL Championship Team of the Week	
26	(Republic of Ireland)	Jordan Shipley	MF	10 May 2021	EFL Championship Team of the Week	

=== End-of-season awards ===
No.	Nat.	Player	Pos.	Date	Award	Ref
19	(England)	Tyler Walker	FW	8 May 2021	CCFC Top Goalscorer	
6	(Scotland)	Liam Kelly	MF	13 May 2021	PFA Community Champion of the Season	
11	(England)	Callum O'Hare	MF	14 May 2021	CCFC Player of the Season	
11	(England)	Callum O'Hare	MF	14 May 2021	CCFC Players' Player of the Season	
38	(Netherlands)	Gustavo Hamer	MF	14 May 2021	CCFC Goal of the Season	
11	(England)	Callum O'Hare	MF	17 May 2021	CCFC Young Player of the Season	

== Transfers ==
=== Transfers in ===
Date	Position	Nationality	Name	From	Fee	Ref.
3 July 2020	CM	(Netherlands)	Gustavo Hamer	(Netherlands) PEC Zwolle	£1,350,000	
6 July 2020	RB	(France)	Julien Dacosta	(France) Chamois Niortais	Free transfer	
15 July 2020	AM	(England)	Callum O'Hare	(England) Aston Villa	Free transfer	
16 July 2020	RW	(Germany)	Marcel Hilßner	(Germany) SC Paderborn	Undisclosed	
17 July 2020	CB	(Republic of Ireland)	Jay McGrath	(England) Mickleover	Undisclosed	
28 August 2020	CF	(England)	Tyler Walker	(England) Nottingham Forest	Undisclosed	
8 October 2020	CM	(England)	Aidan Finnegan	(England) Birmingham City	Free transfer	
27 November 2020	GK	(Northern Ireland)	Lee Camp	(England) Birmingham City	Free transfer	
28 January 2021	LB	(Scotland)	Josh Reid	(Scotland) Ross County	Undisclosed	
1 February 2021	FW	(Portugal)	Fábio Tavares	(England) Rochdale	Undisclosed	

=== Loans in ===
Date from	Position	Nationality	Name	From	Date until	Ref.
21 July 2020	LB	(England)	Ryan Giles	(England) Wolverhampton Wanderers	25 January 2021	
27 August 2020	CB	(Norway)	Leo Skiri Østigård	(England) Brighton & Hove Albion	End of season	
4 September 2020	DM	(England)	Ben Sheaf	(England) Arsenal	End of season	
20 September 2020	LB	(England)	Sam McCallum	(England) Norwich City	End of season	
6 January 2021	CM	(England)	Matty James	(England) Leicester City	End of season	
15 January 2021	CF	(Sweden)	Viktor Gyökeres	(England) Brighton & Hove Albion	End of season	

=== Loans out ===
Date from	Position	Nationality	Name	To	Date until	Ref.
2 September 2020	FW	(England)	Jonny Ngandu	(Iceland) Keflavík	17 October 2020	
17 September 2020	CM	(England)	Josh Eccles	(England) Gillingham	6 January 2021	
28 September 2020	CB	(England)	Declan Drysdale	(England) Gillingham	12 January 2021	
5 October 2020	LB	(England)	Brandon Mason	(Scotland) St Mirren	End of season	
31 October 2020	CB	(England)	Morgan Williams	(England) Yeovil Town	28 November 2020	
18 December 2020	MF	(Scotland)	Jack Burroughs	(England) Gloucester City	17 January 2021	
18 December 2020	MF	(Scotland)	Jordan Young	(England) Gloucester City	17 January 2021	
13 January 2021	RW	(Germany)	Marcel Hilßner	(England) Oldham Athletic	End of season	
1 February 2021	CB	(England)	Declan Drysdale	(England) Cambridge United	End of season	
1 February 2021	LW	(Curaçao)	Gervane Kastaneer	(Scotland) Heart of Midlothian	End of season	
22 April 2021	CB	(England)	Jordon Thompson	(England) Solihull Moors	End of season	

=== Transfers out ===
Date	Position	Nationality	Name	To	Fee	Ref.
1 July 2020	RW	(England)	Reise Allassani	(England) Dulwich Hamet	Released	
1 July 2020	DM	(England)	Bouwe Bosma	(England) Lewes	Released	
1 July 2020	LB	(England)	Junior Brown	(England) Scunthorpe United	Released	
1 July 2020	RB	(England)	Jak Hickman	(England) Bolton Wanderers	Released	
1 July 2020	FW	(England)	Jordy Hiwula	(England) Portsmouth	Released	
1 July 2020	CM	(England)	Callum Maycock	(England) Solihull Moors	Released	
1 July 2020	RW	(England)	Charlie Wakefield	(England) Wealdstone	Released	
1 July 2020	LW	(England)	Dexter Walters	(England) Tamworth	Released	
3 August 2020	CM	(England)	Zain Westbrooke	(England) Bristol Rovers	Undisclosed	
19 August 2020	CF	(England)	Jordan Ponticelli	(Wales) Wrexham	Undisclosed	
28 January 2021	GK	(Northern Ireland)	Lee Camp	(England) Swindon Town	Released	
