= Will Bapaga =

English footballer

Personal information
- Full name: William Adipepe Pandi Bapaga
- Date of birth: 3 November 2002 (age 24)
- Place of birth: Coventry, England
- Position: Midfielder

Team information
- Current team: Stratford Town

Youth career
- Coventry City

Senior career*
| Years | Team | Apps | (Gls) |
| 2019–2023 | Coventry City | 3 | (0) |
| 2021–2022 | → Grimsby Town (loan) | 10 | (2) |
| 2023–2024 | Buxton | 5 | (0) |
| 2024 | → Mickleover (dual registration) | 1 | (0) |
| 2024– | Stratford Town | | |
- * Club domestic league appearances and goals as of 00:02, 6 February 2025 (UTC)

William Adipepe Pandi Bapaga (born 3 November 2002) is an English professional footballer who plays as a midfielder for Southern League Premier Division Central club Stratford Town

He has previously played professionally for Coventry City and Grimsby Town.

== Career ==
=== Coventry City ===
In July 2019, the 16-year-old Bapaga was announced as a surprise call-up from the youth side.

Bapaga made his professional debut coming on as a substitute on 10 August 2019 in a 0–0 League One draw with Bolton Wanderers, coming on to replace Zain Westbrooke.

On 12 August 2021, Bapaga signed for Grimsby Town on a season-long loan. On 12 January 2022, Bapaga was recalled by parent club Coventry City.

Bapaga was released at the end of the 2022–23 season.

In July 2023, Bapaga joined Huddersfield Town on trial and scored in a friendly victory over Bradford (Park Avenue), as well as appearing in a game against Burnley.

=== Buxton ===
On 18 November 2023, Bapaga joined National League North club Buxton. On 6 February 2024, he joined Southern League Premier Division Central club Mickleover on dual registration.

== Personal life ==
Bapaga is of Congolese descent.

== Career statistics ==
As of match played 10 February 2024

Appearances and goals by club, season and competition
| Club | Season | League | | | FA Cup | | League Cup | | Other | | Total | |
| Club | Season | Division | Apps | Goals | Apps | Goals | Apps | Goals | Apps | Goals | Apps | Goals |
|---|---|---|---|---|---|---|---|---|---|---|---|---|
| Coventry City | 2019–20 | League One | 1 | 0 | 0 | 0 | 0 | 0 | 3 (Note: Appearance in the EFL Trophy) | 0 | 4 | 0 |
| Coventry City | 2020–21 | Championship | 2 | 0 | 1 | 0 | 1 | 0 | — | | 4 | 0 |
| Coventry City | 2021–22 | Championship | 0 | 0 | 0 | 0 | 0 | 0 | — | | 0 | 0 |
| Coventry City | 2022–23 | Championship | 0 | 0 | 0 | 0 | 0 | 0 | — | | 0 | 0 |
| Coventry City | Total | | 3 | 0 | 1 | 0 | 1 | 0 | 3 | 0 | 8 | 0 |
| Grimsby Town (loan) | 2021–22 | National League | 10 | 2 | 2 | 1 | — | | — | | 12 | 3 |
| Buxton | 2023–24 | National League North | 5 | 0 | 0 | 0 | — | | 1 (Note: Appearance in FA Trophy) | 0 | 6 | 0 |
| Mickleover | 2023–24 | Southern League Premier Division Central | 1 | 0 | — | | — | | — | | 1 | 0 |
| Career totals | | | 19 | 2 | 3 | 1 | 1 | 0 | 4 | 0 | 27 | 3 |
