= Ian Maatsen =

Dutch footballer (born 2002)

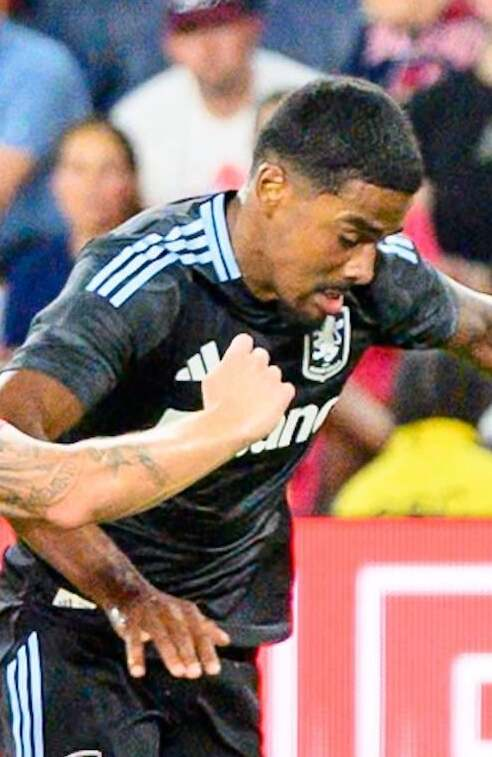
- Maatsen with Aston Villa in 2025

Personal information
- Full name: Ian Ethan Maatsen
- Date of birth: 10 March 2002 (age 24)
- Place of birth: Vlaardingen, Netherlands
- Height: 1.78 m (5 ft 10 in)
- Positions: Left-back; winger

Team information
- Current team: Aston Villa
- Number: 22

Youth career
- 2009–2013: Feyenoord
- 2013–2015: Sparta Rotterdam
- 2015–2018: PSV
- 2018–2019: Chelsea

Senior career*
Years	Team	Apps	(Gls)
2019–2024	Chelsea	12	(0)
2020–2021	→ Charlton Athletic (loan)	34	(1)
2021–2022	→ Coventry City (loan)	40	(3)
2022–2023	→ Burnley (loan)	39	(4)
2024	→ Borussia Dortmund (loan)	16	(3)
2024–	Aston Villa	67	(1)

International career^{‡}
2017	Netherlands U15	6	(0)
2017–2018	Netherlands U16	8	(0)
2018–2019	Netherlands U17	18	(3)
2019	Netherlands U18	1	(0)
2021–2025	Netherlands U21	24	(1)
2025–	Netherlands	3	(1)
Medal record
Men's football
Representing Netherlands
UEFA European Championship
Bronze medal – third place	2024 Germany	Team
UEFA European Under-17 Championship
Winner	2019 Ireland	Team
- * Club domestic league appearances and goals as of 21:16, 21 November 2026 (UTC) ‡ National team caps and goals as of 22:00, 16 November 2026 (UTC)

Ian Ethan Maatsen (born 10 March 2002) is a Dutch professional footballer who plays for Premier League club Aston Villa and the Netherlands national team. Primarily a left-back, he can also play as a winger.

Maatsen was born near Rotterdam and played for local clubs Sparta Rotterdam and Feyenoord as a child, later moving to PSV Eindhoven where he was scouted by and signed by Chelsea. He made his professional debut for Chelsea in 2019 and played on loan at Charlton Athletic, Coventry City, Burnley, and finally Borussia Dortmund where he was named in the UEFA Team of the Season for 2023–24. He signed for Aston Villa in June 2024.

He played for the Netherlands at all youth levels up to under-21 and was included in the senior squad for Euro 2024.

== Club career ==
=== Early career ===
Maatsen joined Feyenoord's academy at the age of seven, but was allegedly dropped for being too small. He moved to Sparta Rotterdam and then PSV Eindhoven, before joining Chelsea in 2018.

=== Chelsea ===
On 25 September 2019, he made his debut for the London club as a substitute in a 7–1 EFL Cup victory over Grimsby Town.

==== Loan to Charlton Athletic ====
On 13 October 2020, Maatsen joined Charlton Athletic on a season-long loan. On 20 October, he made his league debut for Charlton, coming off the bench as a second-half substitute in the side's 1–0 win over Blackpool. He scored his first senior goal on 2 April 2021 in a 1–0 away win over Doncaster Rovers.

==== Loan to Coventry ====
On 30 July 2021, Maatsen joined Coventry City on loan. On 2 October 2021, he scored his first goal for Coventry in a match against Fulham, helping his team to a 4–1 victory. Overall, Maatsen made 40 league appearances for the Sky Blues and scored three goals during the 2021–22 season.

==== Loan to Burnley ====
On 15 July 2022, Maatsen joined Burnley on a season-long loan. He made his debut in the first round of the 2022–23 EFL Championship against Huddersfield Town, where he also scored the only goal of the game in a 1–0 win. Following his impressive performances, Maatsen was named the EFL Championship Player of the Month for January 2023. His team eventually won the league and promotion to the Premier League, with Maatsen being included in the Championship Team of the Season as the best left-back.

==== Loan to Borussia Dortmund ====
On 12 January 2024, Maatsen signed a contract extension with Chelsea until 2026 and joined Borussia Dortmund on a six-month loan. On 16 April, he scored his first Champions League goal in a 4–2 win against Atlético Madrid in the quarter-finals second leg, helping his team progress to the semi-finals. Dortmund eventually reached the final, where Maatsen started the match and made a misplaced pass that led to Real Madrid's second goal in a 2–0 defeat at Wembley Stadium. However, he was named in the competition's Team of the Season as the best left-back.

=== Aston Villa ===
On 28 June 2024, 22-year-old Maatsen signed for fellow Premier League club Aston Villa for an undisclosed fee, reported to be £37.5 million, signing a six-year contract. On 17 August 2024, Maatsen made his Aston Villa debut as a substitute in a 2–1 opening day victory over West Ham United.

On 12 March 2025, Maatsen scored his first goal for Aston Villa during a 3–0 win against Club Brugge in the UEFA Champions League round of 16. In September 2026, Maatsen sustained tendon damage to his right ankle following a challenge from Nottingham Forest's James McAtee. The Club anticipated a 6-8 week injury period.

On 11 November 2026, shortly after making his 100th appearance for Aston Villa, Maatsen signed a new contract with the club, lasting until 2032.

== International career ==
Maatsen was a youth international for the Netherlands, representing the country at all levels from under-15 to under-21.

In September 2023, he received his first call-up to the Netherlands senior team by head coach Ronald Koeman, for two UEFA Euro 2024 qualifying matches against Greece and the Republic of Ireland.

In May 2024, Maatsen was selected in the 30-man preliminary squad for UEFA Euro 2024, but was later omitted from the final squad. However, he was re-called to the Netherlands' Euro 2024 squad on 11 June as a replacement for the injured Frenkie de Jong. On 21 March 2025, Maatsen was called up for the Netherlands senior team once again, after initially being called up for the U21 team, after Jurriën Timber withdrew from the squad with illness. On 23 March, the 23-year-old scored on his debut match against Spain in the second leg of the 2024–25 UEFA Nations League A quarter-final.

== Personal life ==
Born in Vlaardingen, South Holland, Maatsen is of Surinamese descent and also has Indonesian ancestry from Java.

== Career statistics ==
=== Club ===
As of match played 21 November 2026

Appearances and goals by club, season and competition
Club	Season	League			National cup (Note: Includes FA Cup)		League cup (Note: Includes EFL Cup)		Europe		Other		Total	
Club	Season	Division	Apps	Goals	Apps	Goals	Apps	Goals	Apps	Goals	Apps	Goals	Apps	Goals
Chelsea U21	2018–19	—			—		—		—		1 (Note: Appearances in EFL Trophy)	0	1	0
Chelsea U21	2019–20	—			—		—		—		2	0	2	0
Chelsea U21	2020–21	—			—		—		—		2	0	2	0
Chelsea U21	Total		—		—		—		—		5	0	5	0
Chelsea	2019–20	Premier League	0	0	0	0	1	0	0	0	0	0	1	0
Chelsea	2023–24	Premier League	12	0	0	0	3	0	—		—		15	0
Chelsea	Total		12	0	0	0	4	0	0	0	0	0	16	0
Charlton Athletic (loan)	2020–21	League One	34	1	1	0	—		—		0	0	35	1
Coventry City (loan)	2021–22	Championship	40	3	1	0	1	0	—		—		42	3
Burnley (loan)	2022–23	Championship	39	4	2	0	1	0	—		—		42	4
Borussia Dortmund (loan)	2023–24	Bundesliga	16	2	—		—		7 (Note: Appearances in UEFA Champions League)	1	—		23	3
Aston Villa	2024–25	Premier League	29	1	4	0	2	0	10	1	—		45	2
Aston Villa	2025–26	Premier League	30	0	2	0	1	0	11 (Note: Appearances in UEFA Europa League)	1	—		44	1
Aston Villa	2026–27	Premier League	8	0	0	0	1	0	2	0	1 (Note: Appearance in UEFA Super Cup)	0	12	0
Aston Villa	Total		67	1	6	0	4	0	23	2	1	0	101	3
Career total			208	11	10	0	10	0	30	3	6	0	264	14

=== International ===
As of match played 16 November 2026

Appearances and goals by national team and year
National team	Year	Apps	Goals
Netherlands	2025	1	1
Netherlands	2026	2	0
Total		3	1

As of match played 23 March 2025
Netherlands score listed first, score column indicates score after each Maatsen goal.

List of international goals scored by Ian Maatsen
No.	Date	Venue	Cap	Opponent	Score	Result	Competition	Ref.
1	23 March 2025	Mestalla, Valencia, Spain	1	Spain	2–2	3–3 (a.e.t.) (4–5 p)	2024–25 UEFA Nations League A	

== Honours ==
Burnley

- EFL Championship: 2022–23

Borussia Dortmund

- UEFA Champions League runner-up: 2023–24

Aston Villa

- UEFA Europa League: 2025–26

Netherlands U17

- UEFA European Under-17 Championship: 2019

Individual

- EFL Championship Player of the Month: January 2023
- EFL Championship Team of the Season: 2022–23
- PFA Team of the Year: 2022–23 Championship
- Bundesliga Rookie of the Month: January 2024
- UEFA Champions League Team of the Season: 2023–24
