= Josh Pask =

English footballer (born 1997)

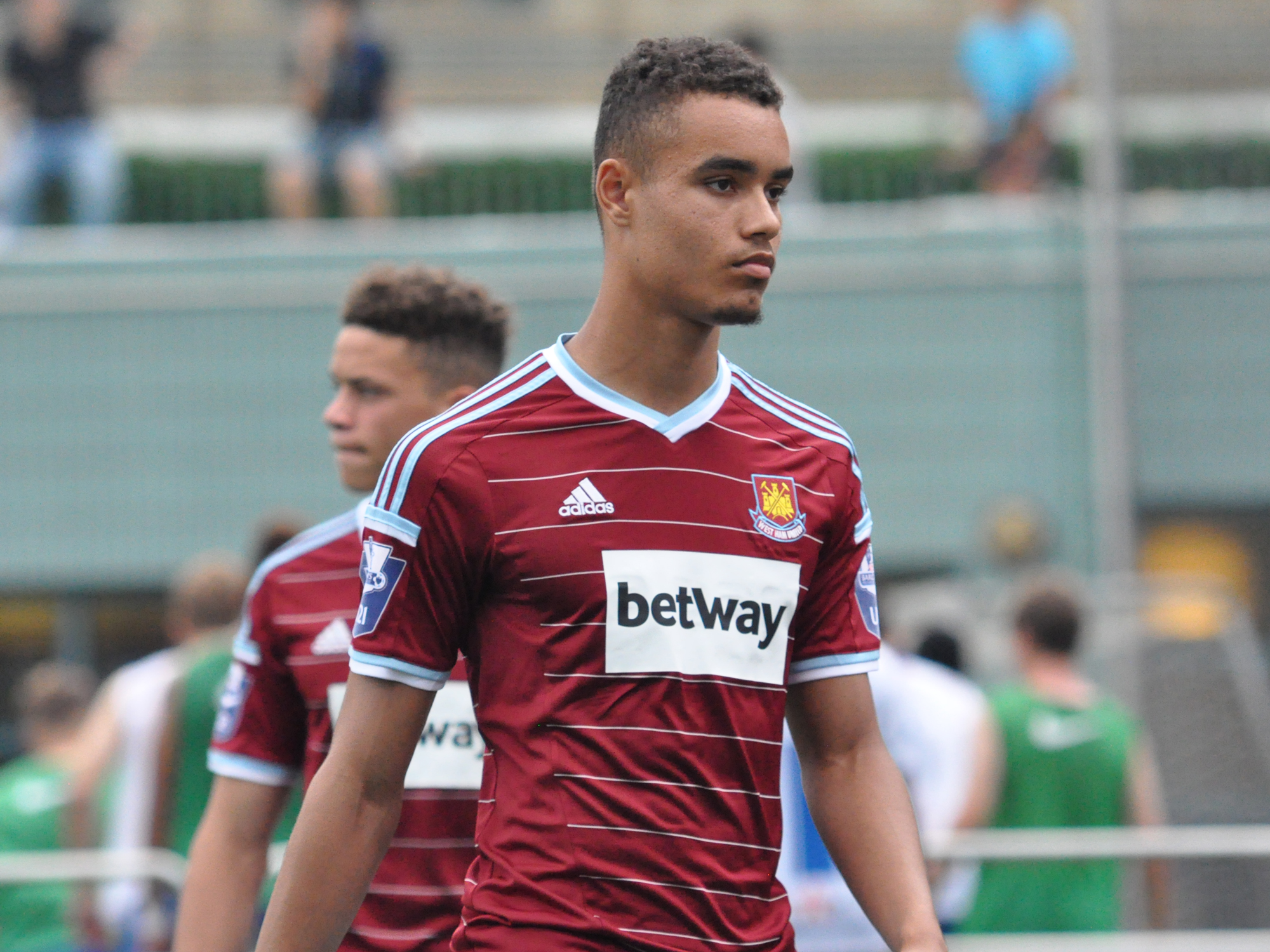
- Pask playing for West Ham United

Personal information
- Full name: Joshua David Pask
- Date of birth: 1 November 1997 (age 29)
- Place of birth: Waltham Forest, London, England
- Height: 6 ft 2 in (1.87 m)
- Position: Defender

Youth career
- 2005–2015: West Ham United

Senior career*
Years	Team	Apps	(Gls)
2015–2019	West Ham United	0	(0)
2015–2016	→ Dagenham & Redbridge (loan)	5	(0)
2016–2017	→ Gillingham (loan)	10	(0)
2019–2022	Coventry City	19	(0)
2022	→ Newport County (loan)	10	(0)
2022–2025	The New Saints	48	(4)
- * Club domestic league appearances and goals as of 19 April 2025

Joshua David Pask (born 1 November 1997) is an English former professional footballer who played as a defender.

== Club career ==
=== West Ham United ===
Pask started his career with his local club West Ham United, joining them at the age of eight. He progressed through the academy and went on to sign a two-year scholarship in the summer of 2014, after turning down an approach from Arsenal. In November 2014, despite still being a first year scholar he signed his first professional contract on his seventeenth birthday, agreeing a three-year deal. In October 2015 he signed a month's loan for Dagenham & Redbridge, a loan which was extended in November for a further month. On 8 August 2016, Pask signed for League One club Gillingham on a season-long loan deal. He made his Gillingham debut the following day in a 3–1 League Cup victory at Southend United.

His contract with West Ham finished at the end of the 2018–19 season.

=== Coventry City ===
Having been released, Pask signed a three-year contract with Coventry City. He did not make his debut for Coventry until 14 January 2020, in a third round FA Cup game. Pask scored on his debut as Coventry won 3–0 against Bristol Rovers.

On 11 January 2022, Pask joined EFL League Two side Newport County on loan for the remainder of the 2021–22 season. He made his debut for Newport on 15 January 2022 in the starting line-up for the 4-0 League Two win against Harrogate Town.

Pask was released by the club at the end of the 2021–22 season.

=== Later career ===
Pask joined Cymru Premier side The New Saints remaining at the club until the end of the 2024–25 season. On 1 January 2026, he announced on his Instagram page that he had retired from professional football.

== Style of play ==
Pask has been described as "a centre-back by trade [who] can also play at right-back and as a holding midfielder".

== Personal life ==
Pask is a Christian and is involved in the Christian charity F3.

== Career statistics ==
As of match played 7 May 2022

Club statistics
Club	Season	League			Cup		League Cup		Other		Total	
Club	Season	Division	Apps	Goals	Apps	Goals	Apps	Goals	Apps	Goals	Apps	Goals
West Ham United	2015–16	Premier League	0	0	0	0	0	0	—		0	0
West Ham United	2016–17	Premier League	0	0	0	0	0	0	—		0	0
West Ham United	2017–18	Premier League	0	0	0	0	0	0	—		0	0
West Ham United	2018–19	Premier League	0	0	0	0	0	0	—		0	0
West Ham United	Total		0	0	0	0	0	0	0	0	0	0
Dagenham & Redbridge (loan)	2015–16	League Two	5	0	0	0	0	0	1 (Note: Appearance(s) in EFL Trophy)	0	6	0
Gillingham (loan)	2016–17	League One	10	0	0	0	2	0	3	0	15	0
Coventry City	2019–20	League One	2	0	2	1	0	0	0	0	4	1
Coventry City	2020–21	Championship	17	0	0	0	1	0	—		18	0
Coventry City	2021–22	Championship	0	0	0	0	1	0	—		1	0
Coventry City	Total		19	0	2	1	2	0	0	0	23	1
Newport County (loan)	2021–22	League Two	10	0	0	0	0	0	0	0	10	0
Career totals			44	0	2	1	4	0	4	0	54	1
