= Jonny Ngandu =

English footballer (born 2001)

Personal information
- Full name: Kasonga Jonathan Ngandu
- Date of birth: 25 October 2001 (age 25)
- Place of birth: Redbridge, England
- Position: Midfielder

Team information
- Current team: Alvechurch
- Number: 8

Youth career
- 200?–2018: Coventry City

Senior career*
Years	Team	Apps	(Gls)
2018–2022	Coventry City	0	(0)
2020	→ Keflavík (loan)	4	(0)
2022–2023	Hamilton Academical	9	(0)
2023	→ Stranraer (loan)	5	(1)
2023	Stratford Town	10	(1)
2023–2024	Darlington	19	(2)
2024–2025	Spalding United	19	(0)
2025	→ Alvechurch (loan)	7	(1)
2025–	Alvechurch		
- * Club domestic league appearances and goals as of 16:09, 8 June 2025 (UTC)

Kasonga Jonathan Ngandu (born 25 October 2001) is an English professional footballer who plays as a midfielder for Southern League Premier Division Central club Alvechurch.

He came through Coventry City's academy and spent time on loan at Icelandic club Keflavík before leaving Coventry in 2022 having made just one senior appearance, in the EFL Trophy. He spent a season with Scottish Championship club Hamilton Academical and Stranraer of Scottish League Two before returning to England with non-league clubs Stratford Town and Darlington.

== Career ==
=== Coventry City ===
Ngandu was born in Redbridge, London, and raised in Coventry, West Midlands. He joined Coventry City's academy as a six-year-old, and played above his age-group throughout his development. While still 16, he was an unused substitute in the EFL Trophy, and soon after his 17th birthday in October 2018 he signed his first professional contract, of two-and-a-half years. Two weeks later he made his senior debut, starting in the EFL Trophy against Cheltenham Town on 13 November to become the sixth-youngest Coventry player to start a first-team match.

Ngandu's progress stalled somewhat in the 2019–20 season, and illness disrupted his pre-season training. He joined promotion-chasing Icelandic 1. deild karla (second-tier) club Keflavík on 2 September 2020 on loan. He played four matches, was named in the team of the week, and helped the team reach first place in the table before returning to his parent club when the COVID-19 pandemic brought a premature end to the Icelandic football season.

Coventry City took up their option of another year on Ngandu's contract, and the Coventry Telegraph speculated that, as one of "several players with a bit of a question mark over their heads", he might go out on loan again. He stayed, and as captain of Coventry under-23s, Ngandu scored two penalties in the semi-final of the 2021–22 Professional Development League as his team beat Ipswich Town 5–4, and led them to a 3–2 victory over Bristol City U23 in the final, knowing that he had been released by the club, so would be leaving at the end of the season.

=== Hamilton Academical ===
In June 2022, he appeared as a trialist in a friendly for Scottish Championship side Hamilton Academical. He signed for the club on 5 July. He made fourteen appearances in the early part of the season, the last of which was on 8 November in a 3–0 win against Rangers B in the League Challenge Cup.

In February 2023, he joined Scottish League Two side Stranraer on loan until the end of the season. He played in nine league matches and scored his first senior goal, a strike from outside the penalty area in a 1–0 win away to Albion Rovers on 21 March.

He was released by Hamilton at the end of the season.

=== Non-League football in England ===
Ngandu returned to the Midlands and joined Southern League Premier Division Central club Stratford Town ahead of the 2023–24 season. He played in the first 11 matches of the season, before making the step up to Darlington of the National League North. He scored twice from 20 appearances, including the only goal of the league visit to Gloucester City, and left the club when his contract expired at the end of the season. Ngandu signed for Southern League Premier Division Central club Spalding United in June 2024. He was a regular in the matchday squad in the first half of the season, but fell out of favour and joined divisional rivals Alvechurch on loan in March 2025 before being recalled after his first month. He joined Alvechurch permanently in June 2025.

== Career statistics ==
As of end of 2024–25 season

Appearances and goals by club, season and competition
Club	Season	League			National cup (Note: Includes FA Cup, Scottish Cup)		League cup (Note: Includes EFL Cup, Scottish League Cup)		Other		Total	
Club	Season	Division	Apps	Goals	Apps	Goals	Apps	Goals	Apps	Goals	Apps	Goals
Coventry City	2018–19	League One	0	0	0	0	0	0	1 (Note: Appearance in EFL Trophy)	0	1	0
Coventry City	2019–20	League One	0	0	0	0	0	0	—		0	0
Coventry City	2020–21	Championship	0	0	0	0	0	0	—		0	0
Coventry City	2021–22	Championship	0	0	0	0	0	0	—		0	0
Coventry City	Total		0	0	0	0	0	0	1	0	1	0
Keflavík (loan)	2020	1. deild karla	4	0	0	0	—		—		4	0
Hamilton Academical	2022–23	Scottish Championship	9	0	0	0	4	0	1 (Note: Appearance in Scottish League Challenge Cup)	0	14	0
Stranraer	2022–23	Scottish League Two	9	1	—		—		—		9	1
Stratford Town	2023–24	Southern League; Premier Division Central	10	1	1	0	—		—		11	1
Darlington	2023–24	National League North	19	2	—		—		1 (Note: Appearance in FA Trophy)	0	20	2
Spalding United	2024–25	Southern League; Premier Division Central	19	0	2	0	—		0	0	21	0
Alvechurch	2024–25	Southern League; Premier Division Central	7	1	—		—		—		7	1
Career total			77	5	3	0	4	0	3	0	87	5
