= Tom Billson =

English footballer

Personal information
- Full name: Thomas David Bannatyne-Billson
- Date of birth: 18 October 2000 (age 26)
- Place of birth: Shrewsbury, England
- Height: 6 ft 2 in (1.88 m)
- Position: Goalkeeper

Youth career
- 2017–2019: Coventry City

Senior career*
Years	Team	Apps	(Gls)
2019–2023	Coventry City	0	(0)
2019	→ Barwell (loan)	3	(0)
2021–2022	→ Scunthorpe United (loan)	1	(0)
2022	→ Kidderminster Harriers (loan)	4	(0)
2023	→ Scunthorpe United (loan)	5	(0)
- * Club domestic league appearances and goals as of 15:03, 2 May 2023 (UTC)

Thomas David Bannatyne-Billson is an English former footballer who played as a goalkeeper most recently for Coventry City.

== Career ==
Born in Shrewsbury, Billson started his career with Coventry City, during his time at the club he had a loan spell at Barwell.

He made his professional debut starting on 15 September 2020 in a 5-4 penalty shootout loss in an EFL Cup Second Round game with Gillingham.

In July 2021, Billson joined EFL League Two side Scunthorpe United on loan for the season. On 11 January 2022, Billson was recalled from the loan by parent club Coventry City.

On 14 November 2022, Billson joined National League North side Kidderminster Harriers on a one-month loan deal. In March 2023, he returned to Scunthorpe United on loan until the end of the season.

== Career statistics ==
As of match played on 15 April 2023

Appearances and goals by club, season and competition
Club	Season	League			FA Cup		League Cup		Other		Total	
Club	Season	Division	Apps	Goals	Apps	Goals	Apps	Goals	Apps	Goals	Apps	Goals
Coventry City	2019–20	League One	0	0	0	0	0	0	0	0	0	0
Coventry City	2020–21	Championship	0	0	0	0	1	0	0	0	1	0
Coventry City	2021–22	Championship	0	0	0	0	0	0	0	0	0	0
Coventry City	Total		0	0	0	0	1	0	0	0	1	0
Barwell (loan)	2019–20	Southern Premier Division Central	3	0	1	0	0	0	0	0	4	0
Scunthorpe United (loan)	2021–22	League Two	1	0	0	0	0	0	0	0	1	0
Kidderminster Harriers (loan)	2022–23	National League North	4	0	0	0	0	0	1 (Note: Appearance in the FA Trophy)	0	5	0
Scunthorpe United (loan)	2022–23	National League	5	0	0	0	0	0	0	0	5	0
Career totals			13	0	1	0	1	0	1	0	16	0
