= Jack Burroughs =

Scottish footballer (born 2001)

Personal information
- Full name: Jack Stephen Burroughs
- Date of birth: 21 March 2001 (age 25)
- Place of birth: Coventry, England
- Height: 1.88 m (6 ft 2 in)
- Position: Right-back

Team information
- Current team: Northampton Town
- Number: 30

Youth career
- 2009–2018: Coventry City

Senior career*
Years	Team	Apps	(Gls)
2018–2025	Coventry City	14	(0)
2019–2020	→ Nuneaton Borough (loan)	3	(0)
2020	→ Gloucester City (loan)	5	(0)
2021–2022	→ Ross County (loan)	17	(0)
2023–2024	→ Lincoln City (loan)	29	(0)
2024–2025	→ Kilmarnock (loan)	12	(0)
2025–	Northampton Town	27	(0)

International career^{‡}
2019–2020	Scotland U19	8	(2)
2021–2022	Scotland U21	8	(0)
- * Club domestic league appearances and goals as of 14:09, 14 February 2026 (UTC) ‡ National team caps and goals as of 12:01, 29 August 2024 (UTC)

Jack Stephen Burroughs (born 21 March 2001) is a professional footballer who plays as a right-back for EFL League Two club Northampton Town. Born in England, he represented Scotland internationally at youth level.

== Career ==
Burroughs started his career in the youth system at Coventry City before making his debut in an EFL Trophy game against Forest Green Rovers coming on as a 62nd minute substitute for Jak Hickman. Making his debut Jack became the first player born in this millennium to represent Coventry City. A week later, Jack signed his first professional contract at the club, joining on a two-year deal.

In December 2019, Jack joined Nuneaton Borough on a one-month loan deal. A year later he went on loan to Gloucester City for a month.

On 6 August 2021, Burroughs joined Scottish Premiership side Ross County on a season long loan.

On 2 June 2023, Burroughs signed a new two-year contract with Coventry City until 2025.

On 10 August 2023, Burroughs joined Lincoln City on a season long loan. He made his Imps debut in a 3-0 win against Wycombe Wanderers coming off the bench on 12 August 2023. He scored his first goal in an EFL Trophy match against Notts County on 7 November 2023.

On 20 August 2024, Burroughs joined Kilmarnock on a season long loan. In January 2025, Burroughs was recalled by Coventry and ended his loan spell with Kilmarnock. He was released following the end of the 2024–25 season..

On 29 May 2025, Burroughs signed a two-year deal at Northampton Town.

== International career ==
Burroughs was selected for the Scotland under-19 team in January 2019, making his debut on 17 February against Azerbaijan in a 2–0 win. His younger brother George Burroughs was also selected for Scotland a week later and made his debut on 8 February against Hungary under-17s in a 2–1 victory.

Jack scored his first goal for Scotland U19s against Turkey U19s in a 2019 UEFA European Under-19 Championship qualification match.

In May 2021, he received his first call-up to the Scotland U21s to face Northern Ireland U21 in June 2021.

== Career statistics ==
As of match played on 6 August 2026

Appearances and goals by club, season and competition
Club	Season	League			Cup		League Cup		Other		Total	
Club	Season	Division	Apps	Goals	Apps	Goals	Apps	Goals	Apps	Goals	Apps	Goals
Coventry City	2018–19	League One	0	0	0	0	0	0	2 (Note: Appearances in EFL Trophy)	0	2	0
Coventry City	2019–20	League One	0	0	0	0	0	0	1	0	1	0
Coventry City	2020–21	Championship	2	0	0	0	1	0	—		3	0
Coventry City	2021–22	Championship	0	0	0	0	0	0	—		0	0
Coventry City	2022–23	Championship	12	0	1	0	1	0	—		14	0
Coventry City	2023–24	Championship	0	0	0	0	0	0	—		0	0
Coventry City	2024–25	Championship	0	0	1	0	0	0	—		1	0
Coventry City	Total		14	0	2	0	2	0	3	0	21	0
Nuneaton Borough (loan)	2019–20	Southern Premier Central	3	0	0	0	0	0	0	0	3	0
Gloucester City (loan)	2020–21	National League North	5	0	0	0	0	0	2 (Note: Appearance in the FA Trophy)	1	7	1
Ross County (loan)	2021–22	Scottish Premiership	17	0	1	0	0	0	—		18	0
Lincoln City (loan)	2023–24	League One	29	0	1	0	2	0	3	1	35	1
Kilmarnock (loan)	2024–25	Scottish Premiership	12	0	0	0	0	0	2 (Note: Appearances in UEFA Conference League)	0	12	0
Northampton Town	2025–26	League One	27	0	0	0	1	0	5	0	33	0
Career total			107	0	4	0	5	0	15	2	131	2
