= Ricardo Dinanga =

Footballer (born 2001)

Personal information
- Full name: Ricardo Flisberto Dinanga
- Date of birth: 6 December 2001 (age 24)
- Place of birth: Cork, Ireland
- Position: Forward

Team information
- Current team: AFC Telford United (on loan from Shrewsbury Town)
- Number: 20

Youth career
- Ballincollig
- –2018: College Corinthians
- 2018–2019: Cork City

Senior career*
Years	Team	Apps	(Gls)
2019–2021	Cork City	7	(1)
2021–2023	Coventry City	0	(0)
2022	→ Hereford (loan)	3	(0)
2023	→ Nuneaton Borough (loan)	8	(3)
2023–2025	AFC Telford United	58	(16)
2025–	Shrewsbury Town	1	(0)
2025–	→ AFC Telford United (loan)	2	(0)
- * Club domestic league appearances and goals as of 20:53, 26 August 2025 (UTC)

Ricardo Flisberto Dinanga (born 6 December 2001) is a professional footballer who plays as a forward for AFC Telford United on loan from EFL League Two club Shrewsbury Town. Born in the Republic of Ireland, Dinanga also holds dual citizenship with the Democratic Republic of the Congo.

Dinanga joined Cork City in 2018, and made his senior debut with them in 2019. After scoring twice in 9 games with them, he joined Coventry City in 2021. After loan spells with Hereford and Nuneaton Borough, he was released in 2023. He was then signed by Telford United later that year, and played regularly across two seasons. After scoring 12 goals in 28 games for the first half of the 2024–25 season, he joined League One side Shrewsbury Town.

== Career ==
=== Early career ===
Dinanga played for Ballincollig and College Corinthians, before joining Cork City at the under-17 level in 2018. He made his debut for the Cork senior team on 25 October 2019, in a 3–0 defeat to Shamrock Rovers. He scored his first senior goal for Cork on 11 August 2020, an injury time winner in a 1–0 win over Longford Town in the FAI Cup. He then scored the following match for his first league goal, a 3–0 win over Sligo Rovers on 14 August. He played his full debut on 9 October, in a 3–0 defeat to Bohemians. Cork offered Dinanga his first professional contract in 2021, but he refused in favour of playing in England. He went on trial with both Sunderland and Coventry City, but Sunderland refused to pay the compensation fee. He eventually joined Coventry on a free transfer, signing a two-year contract, to play for their under-23s.

Dinanga initially struggled at Coventry, stating "It was tough at the beginning trying to get used to not having friends and family around." He later became a regular of the team though, and won the Professional Development League final in May 2022. He was then sent on a one-month loan to National League North side Hereford in November. On 26 November, he made his debut for Hereford in a 2–1 defeat to Darlington. He made 3 appearances without scoring before returning to Coventry. In March 2023, Dinanga was loaned to Southern League Central Premier Division side Nuneaton Borough for the rest of the season. He made his debut for Nuneaton on 25 March in a 1–1 draw to Needham Market. He scored his first goal on 4 April in a 2–0 win against Bedford Town. Dinanga played in the play-off final on 1 May, but lost on penalties to Rushall Olympic. He finished his loan with 10 appearances and 3 goals in all competitions. He was released by Coventry following the expiry of his contract in the summer of 2023.

=== AFC Telford United ===
After impressing in trial, it was announced that Dinanga had signed a one-year deal with fellow Southern League Central Premier Division side AFC Telford United in 2023. He scored on his debut on the opening day of the 2023–24 season on 5 August, in a 3–0 win over Royston Town. He scored 7 goals in 37 appearances in all competitions across the season, helping Telford to second place in the league. Telford also made it to the play-off final on 6 May, but were defeated 1–0 by Leamington. He extended his contract with Telford ahead of the 2024–25 season. After scoring a brace in a 4–1 win over Bishop's Stortford in November, manager Kevin Wilkin said Dinanga was a "vital cog" for Telford. By January 2025, he had scored 12 goals in 28 appearances.

=== Shrewsbury Town ===
On 22 January 2025, it was announced that Dinanga had signed for Shropshire rivals and League One side Shrewsbury Town on a two-and-a-half-year deal. Shrewsbury had activated his release clause for an undisclosed fee. He made his debut for Shrewsbury on 15 February in a 3–2 defeat to Bolton Wanderers after coming on for Alex Gilliead. By March, he had only made one appearance — his aforementioned debut — and manager Gareth Ainsworth stated, "It was always going to be a patient one with him. He's got to get up to the speed of professional football in League One."

On 19 August 2025, Dinanga returned to AFC Telford United, now of the National League North following their promotion, on loan for the remainder of the 2025–26 season.

== Career statistics ==
As of 5 April 2025

Appearances and goals by club, season and competition
Club	Season	League			National cup (Note: Includes FAI Cup, FA Cup)		League cup		Other		Total	
Club	Season	Division	Apps	Goals	Apps	Goals	Apps	Goals	Apps	Goals	Apps	Goals
Cork City	2019	LOI Premier Division	1	0	0	0	0	0	0	0	1	0
Cork City	2020	LOI Premier Division	6	1	2	1	0	0	2 (Note: Appearances in Munster Senior Cup)	0	10	2
Cork City	Total		7	1	2	1	0	0	2	0	11	2
Hereford (loan)	2022–23	National League North	3	0	0	0	—		0	0	3	0
Nuneaton Borough (loan)	2022–23	Southern League Central Premier Division	8	3	0	0	—		2 (Note: Appearances in Premier Division Central play-offs)	0	10	3
Telford United	2023–24	Southern League Central Premier Division	34	7	1	0	—		2	0	37	7
Telford United	2024–25	Southern League Central Premier Division	24	9	1	1	—		3 (Note: Appearances in FA Trophy)	2	28	12
Telford United	Total		58	16	2	1	0	0	5	2	65	19
Shrewsbury Town	2024–25	League One	1	0	0	0	0	0	0	0	1	0
Career total			88	24	5	2	0	0	7	2	100	28
