= Blaine Rowe =

English footballer

Personal information
- Full name: Blaine Morgan Brian Rowe
- Date of birth: 22 March 2002 (age 24)
- Place of birth: Sandwell, England
- Position: Right back

Team information
- Current team: Stourbridge

Youth career
- –2020: Coventry City

Senior career*
Years	Team	Apps	(Gls)
2020–2023	Coventry City	0	(0)
2022	→ Ayr United (loan)	3	(0)
2023	→ Falkirk (loan)	20	(0)
2023	Barwell	3	(0)
2023–2024	Darlington	6	(0)
2024	→ Mickleover (loan)	1	(0)
2024–2025	Hednesford Town	30	(1)
2025–2025	Stourbridge	36	(0)
2025–	Kettering Town F.C.	34	(3)
- * Club domestic league appearances and goals as of 28th October 2025

Blaine Morgan Brian Rowe (born 22 March 2002) is an English professional footballer who plays as a defender for Southern League Premier Division Central club Stourbridge.

== Career ==
A youth product of Coventry City, Rowe signed his first professional contract with the club in the summer of 2020.

On 31 January 2022, Rowe joined Scottish Championship side Ayr United on loan for the remainder of the season. He made his debut a day later, coming on in the 72nd minute for Jordan Houston against Partick Thistle. Despite showing early promise an injury cut his time in Scotland short. He subsequently joined Scottish League One side Falkirk on 2 January 2023 on a six-month loan. He was released by Coventry at the end of the 2022–23 season.

Following his release from Coventry City, he joined Southern League Premier Division Central club Barwell on a non-contract basis. He signed for National League North club Darlington in October 2023, and returned to the Southern League Central in January 2024 on a month's loan to Mickleover.

In February 2024, Rowe joined Northern Premier League Division One West club Hednesford Town on an 18-month contract. He played regularly for Hednesford, and on 1 January 2025 joined another Southern Premier Central club, Stourbridge, on loan, initially until 8 February. On 13 February 2025 he left Hednesford Town via mutual consent. A day later he ended up joining Stourbridge on a permanent basis.

== Honours ==
Hednesford Town

- Northern Premier League Division One West play-offs: 2025

== Career statistics ==
As of match played 8 February 2025

Appearances and goals by club, season and competition
Club	Season	League			FA Cup		League Cup		Other		Total	
Club	Season	Division	Apps	Goals	Apps	Goals	Apps	Goals	Apps	Goals	Apps	Goals
Coventry City	2021–22	EFL Championship	0	0	0	0	0	0	—		0	0
Coventry City	2022–23	EFL Championship	0	0	0	0	0	0	—		0	0
Coventry City	Total		0	0	0	0	0	0	0	0	0	0
Ayr United (loan)	2021–22	Scottish Championship	3	0	0	0	0	0	—		3	0
Falkirk (loan)	2022–23	Scottish League One	17	0	3	0	0	0	—		20	0
Barwell	2023–24	Southern League; Premier Division Central	3	0	—		—		0	0	3	0
Darlington	2023–24	National League North	6	0	—		—		0	0	6	0
Mickleover (loan)	2023–24	Southern League Prem. Central	1	0	—		—		1 (Note: Appearance in Derbyshire Senior Cup)	0	2	0
Hednesford Town	2023–24	Northern Premier League (NPL) Division One West	6	1	—		—		2 (Note: One appearance in Walsall Senior Cup, one in Birmingham Senior Cup)	0	8	1
Hednesford Town	2024–25	NPL Division One West	17	0	8	0	—		3 (Note: Two appearances in FA Trophy, one in Walsall Senior Cup)	0	28	0
Hednesford Town	Total		23	1	8	0	—		5	0	36	1
Stourbridge (loan)	2024–25	Southern League Prem. Central	8	0	—		—		—		8	0
Total			58	1	11	0	0	0	6	0	75	1
