= Jordan Young (footballer) =

English-Scottish footballer (born 1999)

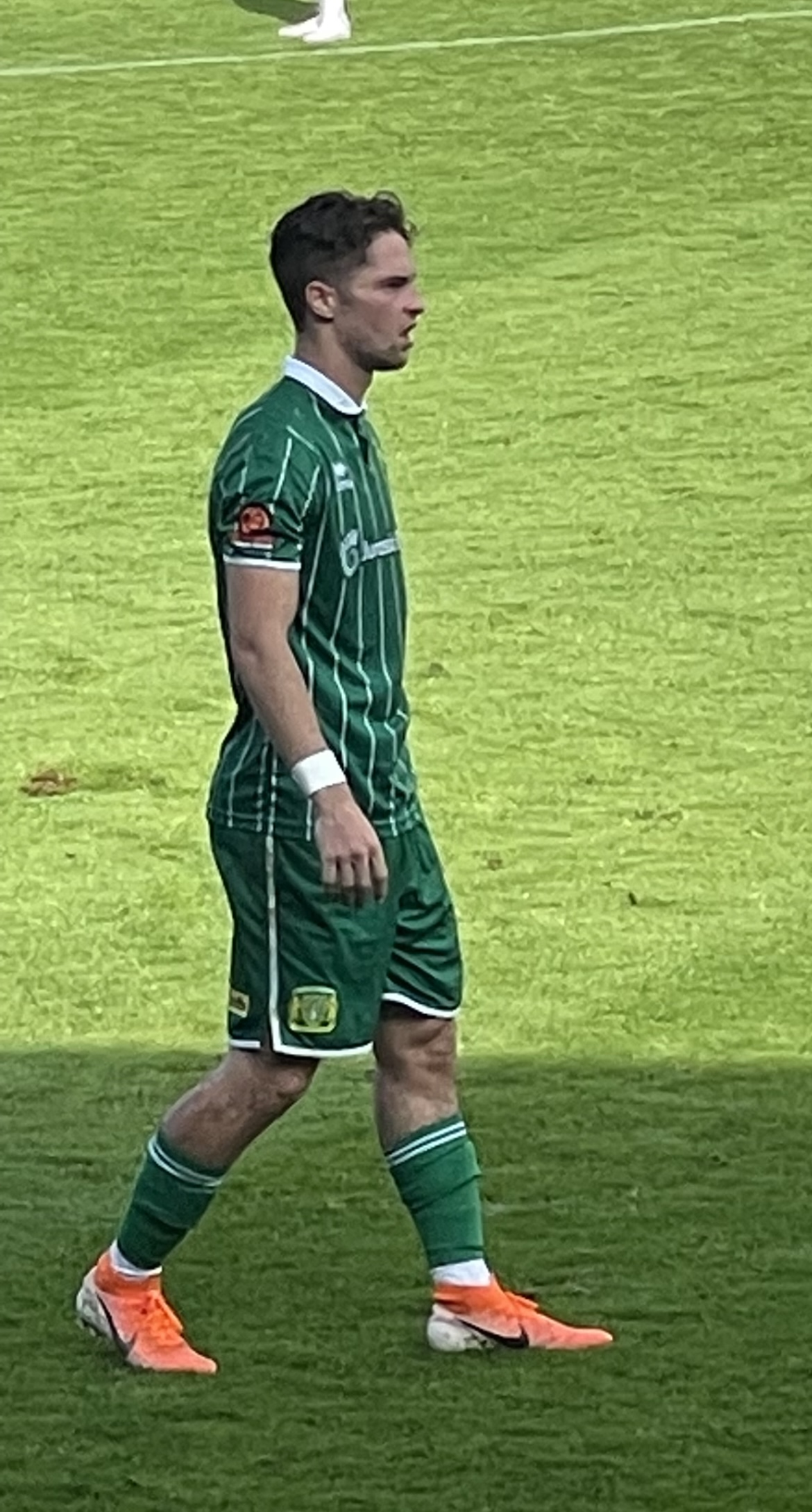
- Young playing for Yeovil Town in 2023

Personal information
- Full name: Jordan John Young
- Date of birth: 31 July 1999 (age 27)
- Place of birth: Chippenham, England
- Height: 1.75 m (5 ft 9 in)
- Position: Forward

Team information
- Current team: Worthing

Youth career
- 2007–2016: Swindon Town

Senior career*
Years	Team	Apps	(Gls)
2015–2019	Swindon Town	5	(1)
2019	→ Highworth Town (loan)	8	(6)
2019–2021	Coventry City	0	(0)
2020	→ Gloucester City (loan)	5	(1)
2021–2022	Gloucester City	14	(2)
2022	→ Chippenham Town (loan)	4	(3)
2022–2023	Chippenham Town	32	(11)
2023–2024	Yeovil Town	73	(15)
2024–2026	Torquay United	76	(26)
2026–	Worthing	11	(4)

International career
2014	Scotland U15		
- * Club domestic league appearances and goals as of 23:27, 21 November 2026 (UTC)

Jordan John Young (born 31 July 1999) is a professional footballer who plays as a forward for National League club Worthing. He previously played in the Football League for Swindon Town. Born in England, Young has represented Scotland at youth level.

== Club career ==
Young began his career at Swindon Town, joining the youth set up at the age of eight, and turned down the chance to join Chelsea's Academy in November 2011. He was called up to the Scotland under-15s in April 2014. He made his debut in the Football League on 2 February 2016, coming on for Jermaine Hylton 62 minutes into a 1–0 defeat to Port Vale at Vale Park. Young then made his home debut and scored his first professional goal in the last game of the 2015–16 season against Shrewsbury Town.

He spent the last two months of the 2018–19 season on loan at Highworth Town, scoring six goals from eight appearances in the Southern League Division One South, and was released by Swindon at its end.

On 16 August 2019, after a successful trial, Young signed a one-year contract with League One club Coventry City. He made his debut as an 86th-minute substitute in an EFL Trophy game v Southampton. This would be his one and only senior appearance for Coventry.

In December 2020, Jordan joined National League North side Gloucester City on a one-month loan deal.

On 12 May 2021 it was announced that he would leave Coventry at the end of the season, following the expiry of his contract.

Following his release from Coventry, Young returned to Gloucester City on a one-year deal.

Young joined Chippenham Town in February 2022, on an undisclosed fee from Gloucester, following a brief loan period

On 12 January 2023, Young signed for National League side Yeovil Town for an undisclosed fee agreeing a two-and-a-half-year deal.

On 28 October 2024, Young signed for National League South side Torquay United for an undisclosed fee, agreeing a contract until May 2027. Young scored on his debut for Torquay in a 2–2 draw against Chelmsford City.

On 7 September 2026, Young signed for National League side Worthing for an undisclosed fee.

== Career statistics ==
As of match played 21 November 2026

Appearances and goals by club, season and competition
Club	Season	League			FA Cup		EFL Cup		Other		Total	
Club	Season	Division	Apps	Goals	Apps	Goals	Apps	Goals	Apps	Goals	Apps	Goals
Swindon Town	2015–16	League One	3	1	0	0	0	0	0	0	3	1
Swindon Town	2016–17	League One	2	0	0	0	0	0	1 (Note: Appearance(s) in the EFL Trophy)	0	3	0
Swindon Town	2017–18	League Two	0	0	0	0	0	0	0	0	0	0
Swindon Town	2018–19	League Two	0	0	0	0	0	0	1	0	1	0
Swindon Town	Total		5	1	0	0	0	0	2	0	7	1
Highworth Town (loan)	2018–19	Southern League; Division One South	8	6	—		—		—		8	6
Coventry City	2019–20	League One	0	0	0	0	0	0	1	0	1	0
Coventry City	2020–21	Championship	0	0	0	0	0	0	—		0	0
Coventry City	Total		0	0	0	0	0	0	1	0	1	0
Gloucester City (loan)	2020–21	National League North	5	1	0	0	—		2 (Note: Appearances in the FA Trophy)	1	7	2
Gloucester City	2021–22	National League North	14	2	2	0	—		0	0	16	2
Chippenham Town (loan)	2021–22	National League South	4	3	—		—		—		4	3
Chippenham Town	2021–22	National League South	15	6	—		—		2 (Note: Appearances in National League South play-offs)	0	17	6
Chippenham Town	2022–23	National League South	17	5	5	2	—		2	2	24	9
Chippenham Town	Total		32	11	5	2	—		4	2	41	15
Yeovil Town	2022–23	National League	18	0	—		—		1 (Note: Appearance in Somerset Premier Cup)	0	19	0
Yeovil Town	2023–24	National League South	41	14	5	2	—		1	0	47	16
Yeovil Town	2024–25	National League	14	1	1	0	—		0	0	15	1
Yeovil Town	Total		73	15	6	2	—		2	0	81	17
Torquay United	2024–25	National League South	33	10	—		—		4 (Note: Three appearances in FA Trophy, one appearance in National League South play-offs)	1	37	11
Torquay United	2025–26	National League South	40	16	1	0	—		2 (Note: One appearance in FA Trophy, one appearance and two goals in National League South play-offs)	2	43	18
Torquay United	2026–27	National League South	3	0	0	0	—		0	0	3	0
Torquay United	Total		76	26	1	0	—		6	3	83	29
Worthing	2026–27	National League	11	4	1	0	—		3 (Note: Two appearances National League Cup, one appearance and one goal in Sussex Senior Cup)	1	15	5
Career total			228	69	15	4	0	0	20	7	263	80

== Honours ==
Yeovil Town

- National League South: 2023–24

Individual

- National League South Team of the Season: 2023–24, 2024–25, 2025–26
