= David Bremang =

English footballer (born 2000)

Personal information
- Full name: David Asare Bremang
- Date of birth: 21 March 2000 (age 26)
- Place of birth: Hammersmith, London, England
- Height: 1.80 m (5 ft 11 in)
- Position: Forward

Team information
- Current team: AFC Croydon Athletic

Youth career
- –2018: Conquest Academy
- 2018–2019: Coventry City

Senior career*
Years	Team	Apps	(Gls)
2019–2021	Coventry City	0	(0)
2019–2020	→ Nuneaton Borough (loan)	6	(4)
2020	→ Leamington (loan)	4	(0)
2021–2022	Barnsley	1	(0)
2022	→ Guiseley (loan)	3	(0)
2022–2023	Crawley Town	9	(0)
2023–2024	Hungerford Town	19	(8)
2024	Farnborough	6	(0)
2025	Dulwich Hamlet	20	(9)
2025–	AFC Croydon Athletic	19	(14)
- * Club domestic league appearances and goals as of 15:39, 14 October 2025 (UTC)

David Asare Bremang (born 21 April 2000) is an English professional footballer who plays as a forward for Isthmian League South East Division club AFC Croydon Athletic.

== Club career ==
Bremang joined Coventry City in 2018 from the London-based Conquest Academy.

On 29 June 2021, Bremang joined Championship side Barnsley for an undisclosed fee. On 5 February 2022, Bremang joined National League North side Guiseley on loan until 3 March 2022.

On 19 August 2022, Bremang joined League Two club Crawley Town for an undisclosed fee.

On 26 January 2023, Bremang's contract with Crawley Town was terminated by mutual consent. Bremang scored one goal in six appearances for the club.

On 3 February 2023, National League South club Hungerford Town announced Bremang had signed a contract until the end of the season.

On 17 August 2024, Bremang joined Farnborough following a successful trial period during their pre-season. In January 2025, he joined Isthmian League Premier Division club Dulwich Hamlet.

== Personal life ==
Born in England, Bremang is of Ghanaian descent.

== Career statistics ==
=== Club ===
As of end of 2024–25 season.

Appearances and goals by club, season and competition
Club	Season	League			FA Cup		EFL Cup		Other		Total	
Club	Season	Division	Apps	Goals	Apps	Goals	Apps	Goals	Apps	Goals	Apps	Goals
Coventry City	2019–20	League One	0	0	0	0	0	0	0	0	0	0
Coventry City	2020–21	Championship	0	0	0	0	0	0	0	0	0	0
Coventry City	Career total		0	0	0	0	0	0	0	0	0	0
Nuneaton Borough (loan)	2019–20	Southern League	6	4	0	0	–		0	0	6	4
Leamington (loan)	2019–20	National League North	4	0	0	0	–		1 (Note: Appearances in the FA Trophy)	0	5	0
Barnsley	2021–22	Championship	1	0	0	0	0	0	0	0	1	0
Guiseley (loan)	2021–22	National League North	3	0	0	0	–		0	0	3	0
Crawley Town	2022–23	League Two	3	0	0	0	1	0	2 (Note: Appearance(s) in EFL Trophy)	1	6	1
Hungerford Town	2022–23	National League South	4	3	0	0	—		1	1	5	4
Farnborough	2024–25	National League South	6	0	1	0	—		0	0	7	0
Dulwich Hamlet	2024–25	Isthmian League Premier Division	14	5	0	0	—		1 (Note: Appearance(s) in London Senior Cup)	0	15	5
Career total			41	12	1	0	0	0	6	2	48	14
