= Dominic Hyam =

Scottish footballer (born 1995)

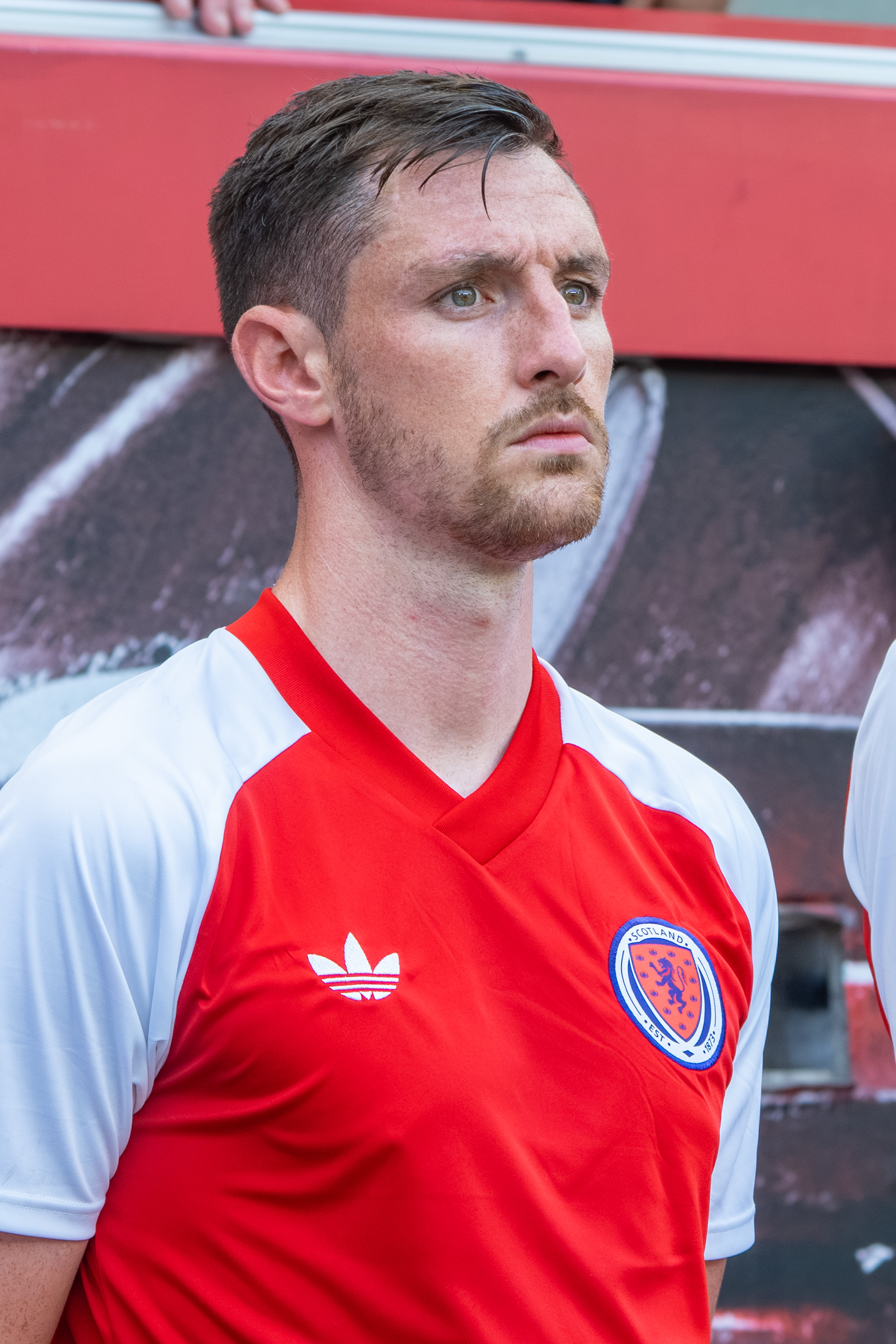
- Hyam with Scotland in 2026

Personal information
- Full name: Dominic John Hyam
- Date of birth: 20 December 1995 (age 30)
- Place of birth: Leuchars, Fife, Scotland
- Height: 6 ft 2 in (1.88 m)
- Position: Centre back

Team information
- Current team: Wrexham
- Number: 5

Youth career
- 2008–2013: Reading

Senior career*
| Years | Team | Apps | (Gls) |
| 2013–2017 | Reading | 0 | (0) |
| 2015 | → Hemel Hempstead Town (loan) | 14 | (0) |
| 2015–2016 | → Basingstoke Town (loan) | 5 | (1) |
| 2016 | → Dagenham & Redbridge (loan) | 16 | (0) |
| 2016 | → Portsmouth (loan) | 0 | (0) |
| 2017 | → Aldershot Town (loan) | 3 | (0) |
| 2017–2022 | Coventry City | 169 | (8) |
| 2022–2025 | Blackburn Rovers | 122 | (4) |
| 2025– | Wrexham | 40 | (0) |

International career^{‡}
| 2014 | Scotland U19 | 4 | (0) |
| 2014–2016 | Scotland U21 | 5 | (0) |
| 2023– | Scotland | 4 | (0) |
- * Club domestic league appearances and goals as of 23:06, 2 May 2026 (UTC) ‡ National team caps and goals as of 12:42, 7 June 2026 (UTC)

Dominic John Hyam (born 20 December 1995) is a Scottish professional footballer who plays for EFL Championship club Wrexham and the Scotland national team. He is known as a reliable, robust and consistent centre-back.

Starting his career at Reading, he played on loan for Hemel Hempstead Town, Basingstoke Town, Dagenham & Redbridge and Aldershot Town. At Coventry City he won promotion by winning the 2018 EFL League Two play-offs, and then as 2019–20 EFL League One champions. He was player of the year at Coventry in 2018–19 and at Blackburn Rovers in 2022–23.

After winning three under-19 and five under-21 Scotland caps, he debuted as a full Scotland international in Oslo in 2023.

== Club career ==
=== Reading ===
Hyam began his career with Reading in 2008 at the age of 12, progressing through the youth system to become an integral part of the youth team that reached the Premier Academy League final in 2013. Aged 17, in November 2013, he signed his first professional contract with the club on a three-year deal.

In February 2015, Hyam joined Conference South side Hemel Hempstead Town on an initial one-month loan. The loan later extended until the end of the season. Hyam played every minute of all 14 league games he played in for Hemel. The club finished the season in ninth place.

On 26 November 2015, Hyam joined National League (the newly re-branded name for the Conference League), Basingstoke Town on loan until 2 January 2016. He played every minute of all five league games he played in during his six weeks there.

On 1 February 2016, Hyam joined EFL League Two, Dagenham & Redbridge on loan initially until 5 March 2016. Staying until the season's end, Hyam started all of the 16 league games he played there.

On 9 May 2016, Hyam was one of 15 Reading youth-team players offered a new contract by the club, with conformation of his new deal being signed coming on 1 July 2016.

In August 2016 he played in three Reading under 23 games before on 31 August, joining Portsmouth on loan until 8 January 2017. However after not playing any Portsmouth first team minutes, he was featuring for Reading under 23s again by the end of November.

On 23 March 2017, Hyam joined National League Aldershot Town on loan until the end of the season. He played in three league games for Aldershot.

On 12 May 2017, Reading announced that Hyam, and nine others, would be leaving the club on the expiration of the contract at the end of June.

=== Coventry City ===
On 24 May 2017, League Two side Coventry City announced the signing of Hyam on a two-year contract, beginning on 1 July 2017. He ended the season with 17 appearances. Coventry qualified for the end of season play offs by finishing sixth. Hyam played in both semi-final games winning 5–2 on aggregate over Notts County. Hyam then played on 28 May 2018 in the Wembley Stadium play off final 3–1 win over Exeter City to win promotion.

Hyam entered into new contract discussions with Coventry at the end of the 2017–18 season. He signed a new two-year contract in December 2019.

In Coventry's 2018–19 season they finished eighth in League One. Hyam started in 37 of his 38 league appearances that season. In 2019–20 Coventry were promoted as League One champions. Hyam started in 28 of his 29 league appearances. He was Coventry City Player of the Year that season.

In the 2020–21 and 2021–22 seasons, Coventry consolidated their position in English football's second tier by finished 16th and 12th respectively. Hyam played regularly in both seasons. In August 2022 he was sold to Blackburn in a deal that was described in the Coventry Telegraph as "a hugely unpopular sale". In total his time at Coventry included 170 first team league appearances. He scored eight goals in 192 Coventry league and cup first team games.

=== Blackburn Rovers ===
On 28 August 2022, Hyam signed for Blackburn Rovers, aged 26, on a three-year contract. It was reported that his undisclosed fee was "for a knock-down £1.5million." The fee was later revealed as "closer to £2.5m" plus "add-ons that could eventually add up to close to £3m."

Hyam scored his first Blackburn goal on 13 September winning 2–0 versus Watford. He started 37 Blackburn league games that season. Blackburn finished the season seventh, on goal difference one place below Sunderland in the sixth place play off spot. Blackburn eliminated top division Leicester City en route to the FA Cup quarter-finals. Hyam was Rovers Player of the Year that season.

In 2023–24 Hyam started 35 league games. Blackburn finished the season in 19th place. They reached the FA Cup fifth round in which they lost to top division Newcastle United on penalties. Sammie Szmodics and Hyam were the Rovers players to have penalties saved.

Hyam played every minute of Blackburn's 2024–25 league campaign. Blackburn ended the season seventh in the league after a 1–1 draw against Sheffield United in the last game of the season, which denied Rovers the sixth place play-off spot.

=== Wrexham ===
On 1 September 2025, Hyam signed a two-year contract with EFL Championship club Wrexham. On 9 January 2026, he scored his first goal for the club in their third round FA Cup penalty shoot-out victory over Nottingham Forest.

== International career ==
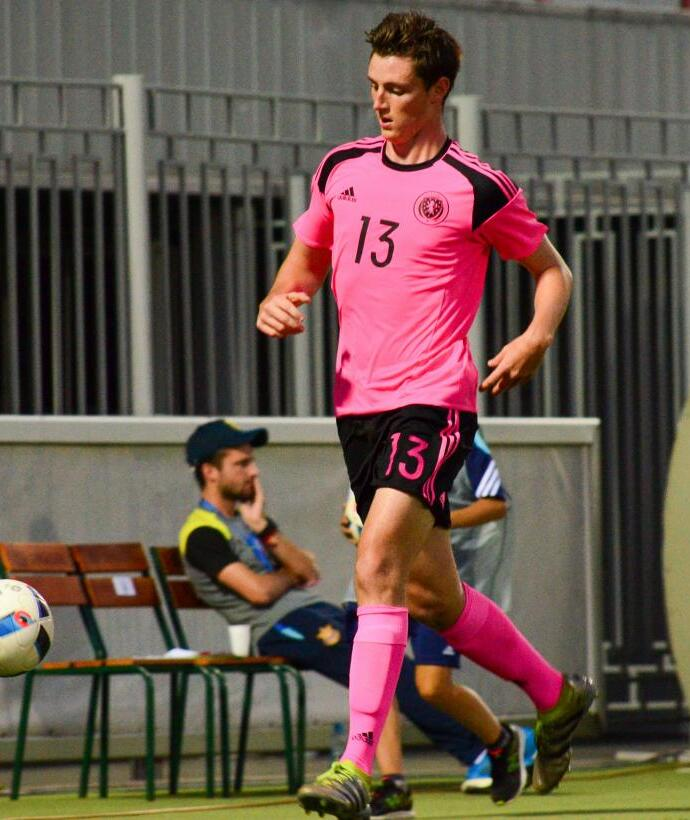
Hyam (number 13) and the under 21s pre-match in Ukraine

Hyam was called up to represent Scotland under-19 while at Reading. On 24 May 2014, he debuted internationally with the under-19s, in a 0–0 draw with Ukraine in Burton on Trent. Hyam lined up with fellow centre-backs, John Souttar and Scott McKenna. Scottish captain Adam King missed a second half penalty. Hyam then played two days later at the same venue against host nation England in a 2–1 defeat for Scotland. Hyam's third and last under 19 cap was three days later in the same competition, this time in Walsall. Scotland lost 1–0 to Montenegro.

Hyam's under-21 debut was on 18 November 2014, drawing 1–1 in Switzerland. After a 2–1 away win over Hungary in March 2015 (Lawrence Shankland scored both Scots goals), Hyam then played in three European Championship qualifiers. These were 2015 home draws with Iceland (0–0) and Ukraine (2–2) before losing in Ukraine 4–0 in September 2016.

In March 2023, Hyam said of playing for Scotland, "That would mean the world to me." Later that month Hyam was added to the Scotland senior squad for the first time. He replaced the injured Jack Hendry.

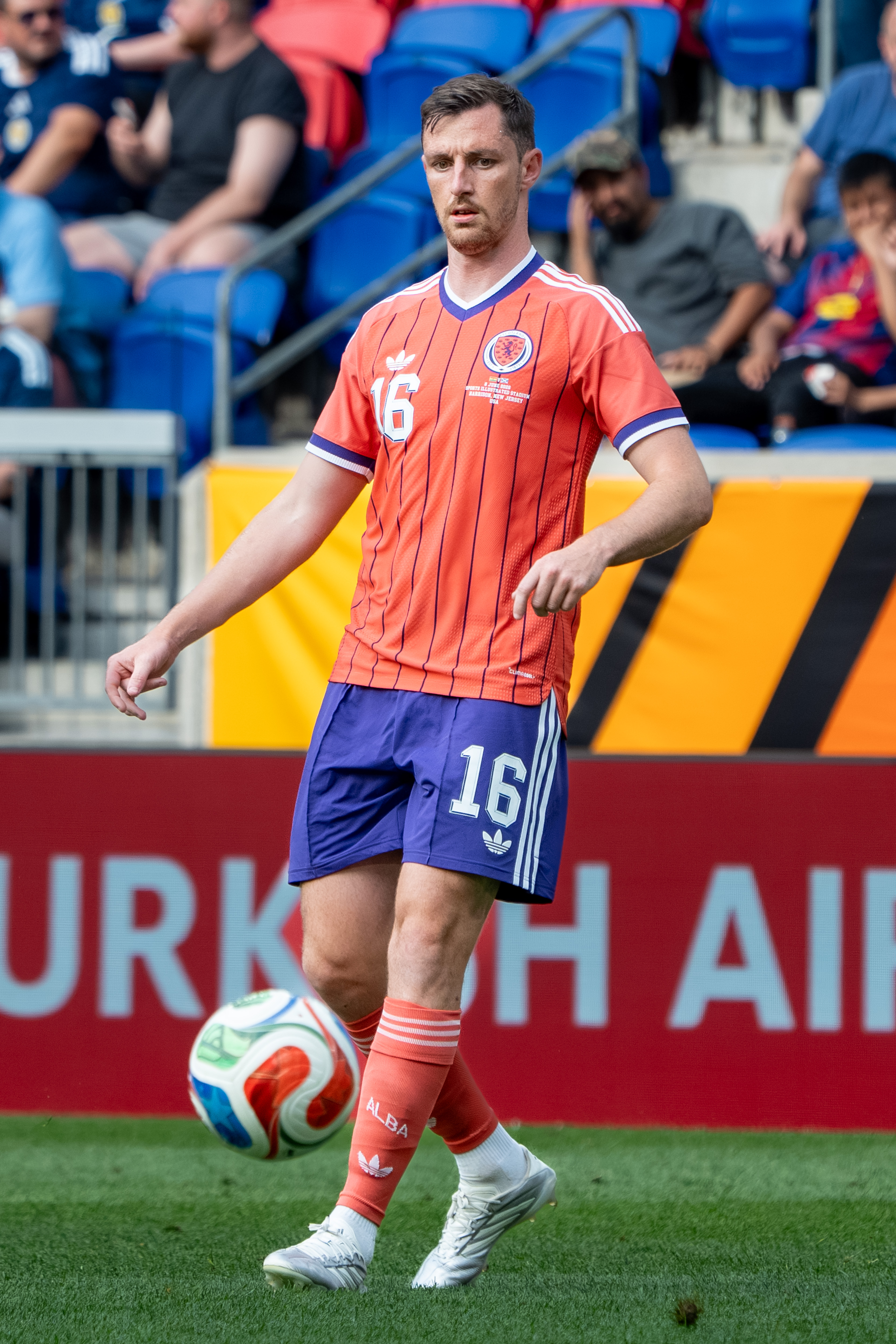
Hyam with Scotland in 2026

Aged 27, Hyam made his full international debut on 17 June 2023 versus Norway in Oslo. He came on as a substitute for John McGinn in the 91st minute of a 2–1 win for Scotland.

On 31 March 2026, nearly three years after his first cap, Hyam earned his second cap and first start for Scotland in a 0–1 friendly loss to the Ivory Coast.

On 19 May 2026, Hyam was selected in the 26-man squad for the 2026 FIFA World Cup.

== Style of play ==
When signing Hyam, Blackburn Rovers Director of Football, Gregg Broughton, commented on "Hyam's passing, one-versus-one defensive duel and leadership abilities".

Hyam was described on the Blackburn Rovers website in April 2025 as, "Reliable and robust". Manager Valerien Ismael added, "He's solid, he's played every game and stands up even when he gets injured, so it's good to have that reliability. He has that consistency to play and a clear profile for a centre-back in being strong in the duels, good on the ball, has that experience and is vocal."

Hyam himself commented in May 2025, "I've had a bit of luck with injuries. I know they are part of the game and I'll get injuries in the future, but availability and consistency is what I've always based my game on. You have to take care of your body and that's something I've stepped up with and taken a lot more seriously in 2024–25."

== Personal life ==
In May 2014, The Herald reported Hyam as stating, "My dad was in the RAF from the age of 16 and used to be based at Leuchars in Fife. My mum was pregnant with me at the time and that's where I was born. He was only there for between six months and a year before we moved back down south. I've got more Scottish than English in me because my dad's mum is from Dundee originally and mum's dad is from Glasgow." Hyam cites his 'Scotland-daft dad' as his main influence.

== Career statistics ==
=== Club ===
As of match played 2 May 2026

Appearances and goals by club, season and competition
| Club | Season | League | | | FA Cup | | League Cup | | Other | | Total | |
| Club | Season | Division | Apps | Goals | Apps | Goals | Apps | Goals | Apps | Goals | Apps | Goals |
|---|---|---|---|---|---|---|---|---|---|---|---|---|
| Reading | 2014–15 | Championship | 0 | 0 | 0 | 0 | 0 | 0 | — | | 0 | 0 |
| Reading | 2015–16 | Championship | 0 | 0 | 0 | 0 | 0 | 0 | — | | 0 | 0 |
| Reading | 2016–17 | Championship | 0 | 0 | 0 | 0 | 0 | 0 | — | | 0 | 0 |
| Reading | Total | | 0 | 0 | 0 | 0 | 0 | 0 | — | | 0 | 0 |
| Hemel Hempstead Town (loan) | 2014–15 | Conference South | 14 | 0 | — | | — | | — | | 14 | 0 |
| Basingstoke Town (loan) | 2015–16 | National League South | 5 | 1 | — | | — | | 1 (Note: Appearance in FA Trophy) | 0 | 6 | 1 |
| Dagenham & Redbridge (loan) | 2015–16 | League Two | 16 | 0 | — | | — | | — | | 16 | 0 |
| Portsmouth (loan) | 2016–17 | League Two | 0 | 0 | — | | — | | — | | 0 | 0 |
| Aldershot Town (loan) | 2016–17 | National League | 3 | 0 | — | | — | | — | | 3 | 0 |
| Coventry City | 2017–18 | League Two | 14 | 0 | 1 | 0 | 1 | 0 | 6 (Note: Three appearances in EFL Trophy, three appearances in League Two play-offs) | 0 | 22 | 0 |
| Coventry City | 2018–19 | League One | 38 | 1 | 1 | 0 | 1 | 0 | 1 (Note: Appearance in EFL Trophy) | 0 | 41 | 1 |
| Coventry City | 2019–20 | League One | 29 | 2 | 6 | 0 | 2 | 0 | 0 | 0 | 37 | 2 |
| Coventry City | 2020–21 | Championship | 43 | 3 | 1 | 0 | 1 | 0 | — | | 45 | 3 |
| Coventry City | 2021–22 | Championship | 43 | 2 | 2 | 1 | 0 | 0 | — | | 45 | 3 |
| Coventry City | 2022–23 | Championship | 2 | 0 | — | | 0 | 0 | — | | 2 | 0 |
| Coventry City | Total | | 169 | 8 | 11 | 1 | 5 | 0 | 7 | 0 | 192 | 9 |
| Blackburn Rovers | 2022–23 | Championship | 37 | 1 | 3 | 0 | 2 | 0 | — | | 42 | 1 |
| Blackburn Rovers | 2023–24 | Championship | 35 | 1 | 3 | 0 | 2 | 0 | — | | 40 | 1 |
| Blackburn Rovers | 2024–25 | Championship | 46 | 2 | 2 | 0 | 1 | 0 | — | | 49 | 2 |
| Blackburn Rovers | 2025–26 | Championship | 4 | 0 | — | | 0 | 0 | — | | 4 | 0 |
| Blackburn Rovers | Total | | 122 | 4 | 8 | 0 | 5 | 0 | — | | 135 | 4 |
| Wrexham | 2025–26 | Championship | 40 | 0 | 3 | 1 | — | | — | | 43 | 1 |
| Wrexham | 2026–27 | Championship | 0 | 0 | 0 | 0 | 1 | 0 | 0 | 0 | 1 | 0 |
| Wrexham | Total | | 40 | 0 | 3 | 1 | 1 | 0 | 0 | 0 | 44 | 1 |
| Career total | | | 369 | 13 | 22 | 2 | 11 | 0 | 8 | 0 | 392 | 15 |

== Honours ==
Coventry City

- EFL League One: 2019–20
- EFL League Two play-offs: 2018

Individual

- Coventry City Player of the Year: 2018–19
- Blackburn Rovers Player of the Year: 2022–23
