= David Dalrymple =

David Dalrymple may refer to:

- Sir David Dalrymple, 1st Baronet (1665–1721)
- David Dalrymple, Lord Westhall (1719–1784) Scottish judge
- David Dalrymple, Lord Hailes (1726–1792), baronet and Lord Advocate
- David Dalrymple (Australian politician) (1840–1912), Member of the Queensland Legislative Assembly
