= Hayden Carter =

English footballer

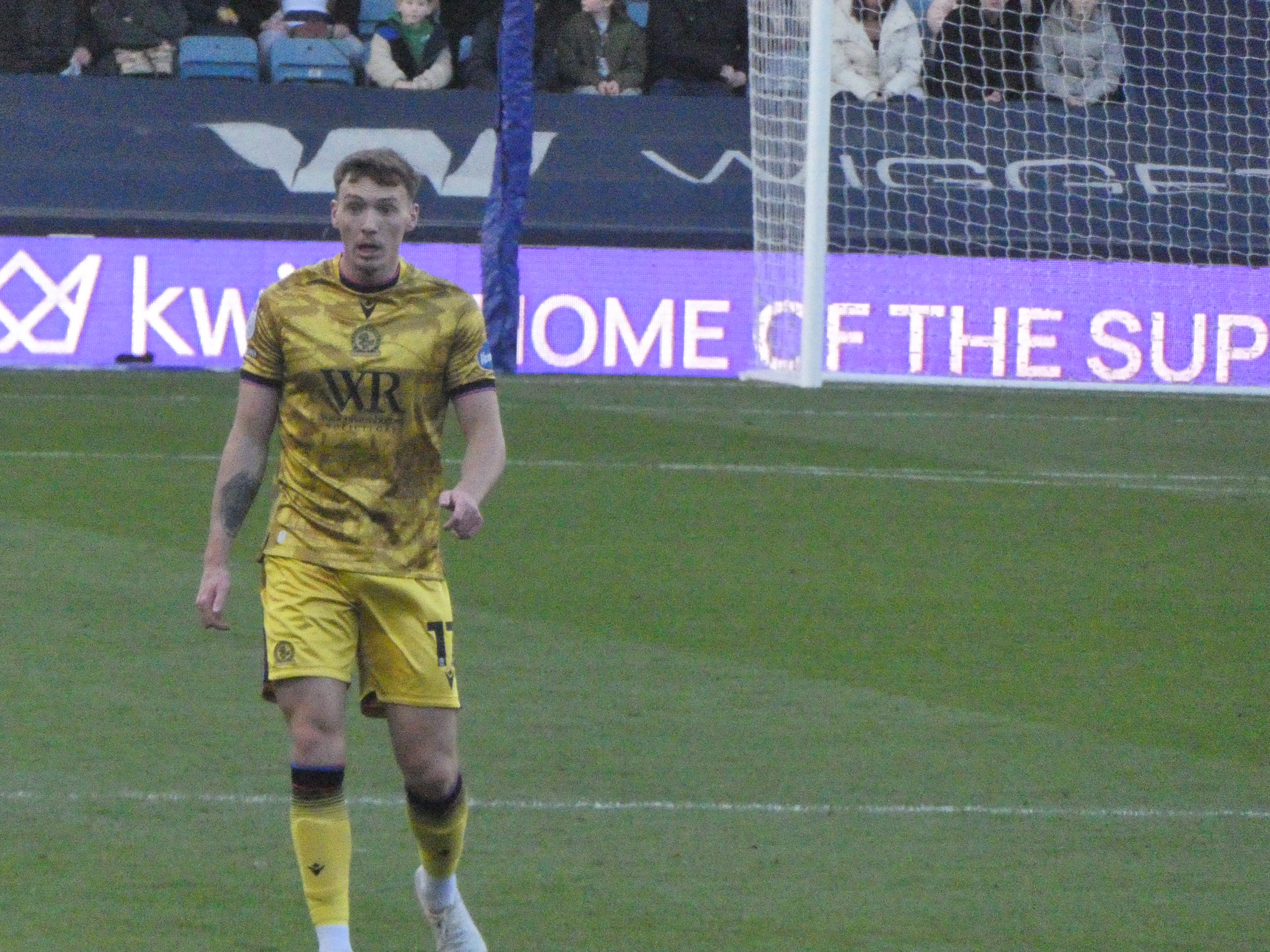
- Carter playing for Blackburn Rovers in 2026.

Personal information
- Full name: Hayden James Carter
- Date of birth: 17 December 1999 (age 26)
- Place of birth: Stockport, England
- Height: 6 ft 2 in (1.88 m)
- Position: Defender

Team information
- Current team: Blackburn Rovers
- Number: 17

Youth career
- –2014: Manchester City
- 2014–2020: Blackburn Rovers

Senior career*
Years	Team	Apps	(Gls)
2020–	Blackburn Rovers	107	(3)
2021	→ Burton Albion (loan)	24	(4)
2022	→ Portsmouth (loan)	22	(1)
- * Club domestic league appearances and goals as of 15:57, 24 October 2026 (UTC)

Hayden James Carter (born 17 December 1999) is an English professional footballer who plays as a defender for EFL Championship side Blackburn Rovers.

== Club career ==
Born in Stockport, Carter played youth football with Manchester City before switching to Blackburn Rovers in 2014.

On 9 June 2020, Carter agreed a new two-year deal with Blackburn. Carter made his professional debut for Blackburn in the club's EFL Championship fixture against Reading on 18 July, playing the full 90-minutes in the 4–3 win.

On 6 January 2021, Carter joined League One side Burton Albion on loan until the end of the season. He made 24 league appearances for Burton, scoring four goals for the side.

On 15 January 2022, Carter joined EFL League One side Portsmouth on loan for the remainder of the 2021–22 season. He made 22 league appearances for Portsmouth, scoring one goal for the side. His sole strike for the club against Oxford United was voted as "Goal of the season" in the club's end of season awards.

On 30 March 2023, Carter extended his contract with Blackburn until June 2027.

== Career statistics ==
As of matches played 24 October 2026

Appearances and goals by club, season and competition
Club	Season	League			FA Cup		League Cup		Other		Total	
Club	Season	Division	Apps	Goals	Apps	Goals	Apps	Goals	Apps	Goals	Apps	Goals
Blackburn Rovers	2019–20	Championship	2	0	0	0	0	0	—		2	0
Blackburn Rovers	2020–21	Championship	1	0	0	0	0	0	—		1	0
Blackburn Rovers	2021–22	Championship	9	0	0	0	1	0	—		10	0
Blackburn Rovers	2022–23	Championship	30	1	5	0	1	0	—		36	1
Blackburn Rovers	2023–24	Championship	31	0	1	0	3	0	—		35	0
Blackburn Rovers	2024–25	Championship	16	0	0	0	2	0	—		18	0
Blackburn Rovers	2025–26	Championship	10	2	0	0	0	0	—		10	2
Blackburn Rovers	2026–27	Championship	8	0	0	0	1	0	—		9	0
Blackburn Rovers	Total		107	3	6	0	8	0	0	0	121	3
Burton Albion (loan)	2020–21	League One	24	4	0	0	0	0	0	0	24	4
Portsmouth (loan)	2021–22	League One	22	1	0	0	0	0	0	0	22	1
Career total			153	8	6	0	8	0	0	0	167	8
