= Hew Dalrymple, Lord Drummore =

Scottish magistrate

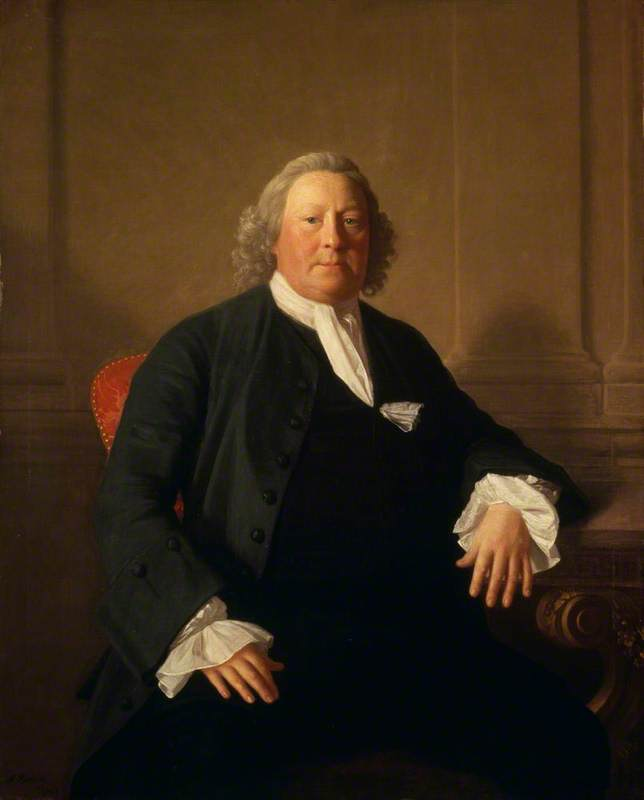
Hew Dalrymple, Lord Drummore, by allan Ramsay

Hew Dalrymple, Lord Drummore (1690–1755) was a Scottish judge and Senator of the College of Justice.

== Life ==
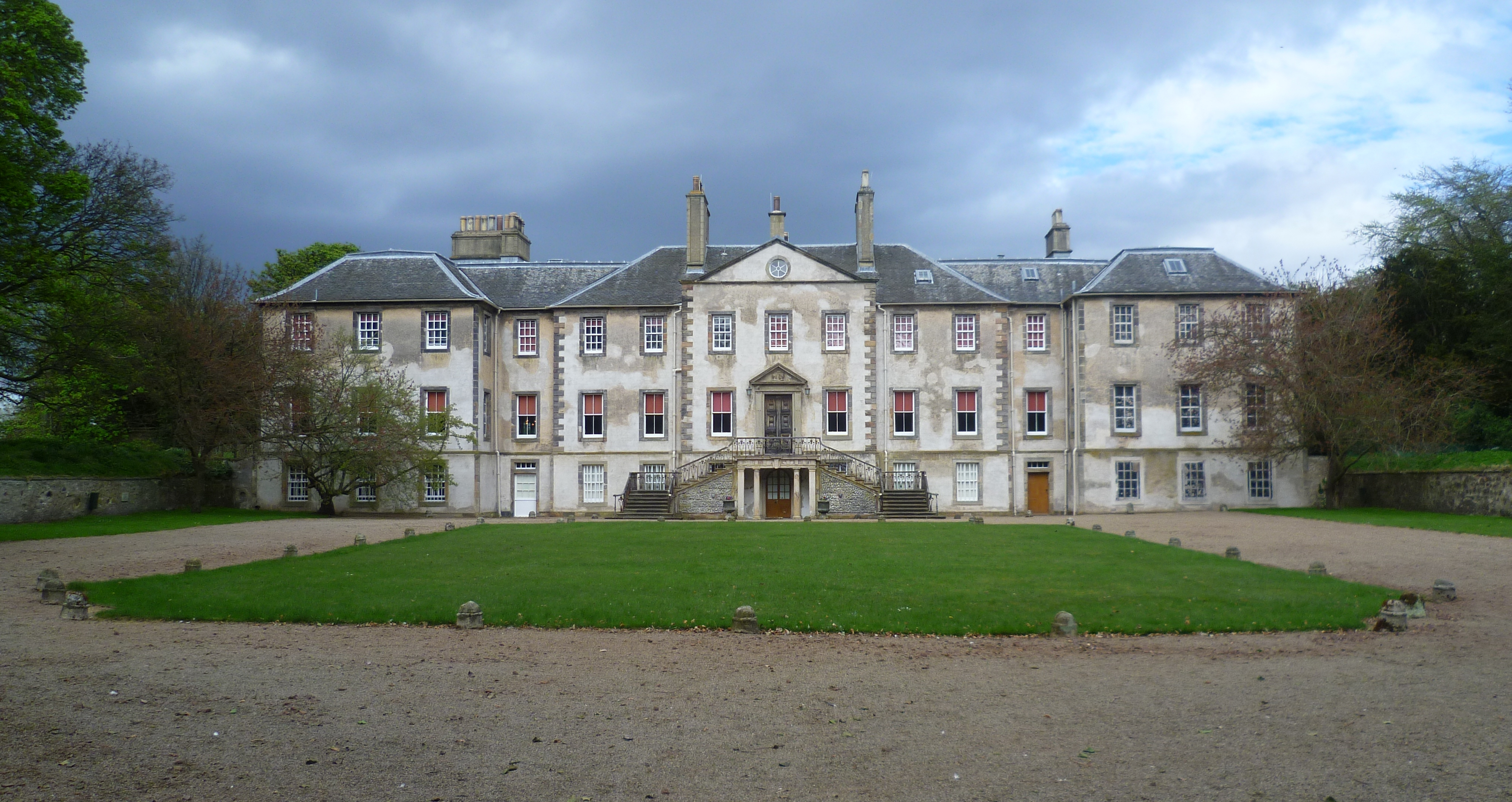
Newhailes House

He was born in Edinburgh on 30 November 1690 the son of Hew Dalrymple, Lord North Berwick and his wife, Marion Hamilton, daughter of Robert Hamilton, Lord Presmennan. The family had estates at Hailes Castle and in Edinburgh. They also had estates in Ayrshire linked to Hew's paternal grandfather, Viscount Stair. His father was an advocate and Dean of the Faculty of Advocates in Edinburgh.

In 1697 his father was created Baronet of North Berwick by King William and became President of the Court of Session in 1698, and was MP for New Galloway from 1696 to 1702 and in 1703 represented North Berwick. In 1706 he was one of the commissioners organising the Union of 1707 which united Scotland and England.

In May 1709 his father and uncle purchased the Whitehill estate near Musselburgh and commissioned the building of Newhailes House, named in honour of the family estate. Various branches of the Dalrymple family appear to have lived in this huge mansion, which was rebuilt in 1720.

Meanwhile, Hew, the son, had trained in Law in Edinburgh and qualified as an advocate in November 1710. Around 1725 he purchased an estate near Prestonpans and built a mansion which he named Drummore House, after his family connection to the old family estate of Drummore in south-west Scotland. He remodelled the house around 1750.

In December 1726 he was elected a Senator of the College of Justice in place of Robert Dundas, Lord Arniston. He adopted the name of Lord Drummore. In 1745 he was elected Lord of Justiciary.

He died at Drummore House on 18 June 1755. The Edinburgh Musical Society, of which he was Governor at the time of his death, held a concert in his memory as a mark of respect.

== Family ==
He married the heiress Ann Horn daughter of John Horn of Oyne who inherited the Westhall estate in Aberdeenshire. Their twelve children included General Robert Dalrymple-Horn-Elphinstone, the father of the first of the Elphinstone-Dalrymple baronets and David Dalrymple, Lord Westhall.

== Artistic recognition ==
Dalrymple's portrait by Allan Ramsay is held by the Scottish National Portrait Gallery.
