= George Haliburton (bishop of Aberdeen) =

Scottish cleric and Jacobite

The Right Reverend George Haliburton
- Bishop of Aberdeen
- Church: Church of Scotland
- See: Diocese of Aberdeen
- In office: 1682–1689
- Predecessor: Patrick Scougal
- Successor: -
- Previous post: Brechin (1678–1682)

Orders
- Consecration: 13 June 1678 (Brechin)

Personal details
- Born: c. 1635 Possibly Perthshire
- Died: 1715 Halton, Angus

George Haliburton (c. 1635 – 1715) was a Scottish cleric and Jacobite. He was both Bishop of Aberdeen and Chancellor of King's College, Aberdeen.

== Life ==
Haliburton received his education at St Salvator's College, St Andrews, obtaining a Master of Arts on 12 June 1652, and an honorary Doctorate in Divinity in 1673.

He was made minister of Coupar Angus in 1659, and was Archdeacon of Dunkeld by the summer of 1663. After obtaining his doctorate, he served as moderator of the Presbytery of Meigle from 1678 until he became Bishop of Brechin, receiving consecration as bishop at St Andrews Cathedral on 13 June 1678. The latter encompassed the roles of provost and minister of Brechin, but nevertheless George remained minister of Coupar Angus.

On 22 June 1682, Haliburton was selected to move to the larger diocese of Aberdeen, and was translated as Bishop of Aberdeen on 5 July 1682. Unlike most members of the Church of Scotland, Haliburton supported episcopacy, and was an active persecutor of the Quakers. In 1688, after the Glorious Revolution, episcopacy was defeated in Scotland and all Church of Scotland bishops were deprived of their sees, including Haliburton. Haliburton was formally deprived of his bishopric on 22 July 1689.

Haliburton moved to Newtyle parish in Angus, assisting the work of an episcopal minister there until the Church of Scotland forcibly took over control of it in 1698. He then retired to his own residence at nearby Halton, and received a pension in the following year. Haliburton became increasingly sympathetic towards Jacobitism and ordained clergy, working closely with re-established episcopalian bishops and archbishops, though the latter often did not inform him about the secret consecrations of new bishops which were taking place.

He moved to Denhead in 1710. He died at Halton on 29 September 1715. Twenty days earlier he had attended the raising of the standard of the Old Pretender at Fetteresso, the act which initiated the First Jacobite rising.

== Family ==
He married Agnes Campbell of Keithock widow of David Haliburton of Pitcur (a cousin). Following her death he married Ms. Rutherford (d. 1738) by whom he had several children:

Church of Scotland titles
Preceded by Robert Laurie	Bishop of Brechin; 1678–1682	Succeeded by Robert Douglas
Preceded by Patrick Scougal	Bishop of Aberdeen; 1682–1689	Episcopacy abolished
