= James Scougal, Lord Whitehill =

Scottish judge and Senator of the College of Justice

James Scougal, Lord Whitehill (c.1652–1702) was a Scottish judge and Senator of the College of Justice.

== Life ==
He was born the youngest son of Anne Congalton and her husband Rev Patrick Scougal in the manse in Leuchars during the period during which his father served as parish minister there (1645 to 1659). His older brother was Henry Scougal. From 1659 the family lived in the manse at Saltoun in East Lothian. His father became Bishop of Aberdeen in 1664 and James would have moved at the same time to live in Old Aberdeen, and may be presumed to have studied law at Aberdeen University.

He practised law in Edinburgh. In 1686 he purchased (or perhaps rented) a house on the estate of Whitehill near Musselburgh, east of Edinburgh. In June 1696 he was elected a Senator of the College of Justice in place of the late Robert Hamilton, Lord Presmennan and adopted the title Lord Whitehill.

In 1699 he bought the estate of Nether Boddam in Aberdeenshire (south of Peterhead.

He died on 23 December 1702. His position as Senator was filled by Roderick Mackenzie, Lord Prestonhall.

The Whitehill estate was redeveloped in 1720 and renamed as Newhailes House.
