= James Hamilton, Lord Pencaitland =

Scottish judge

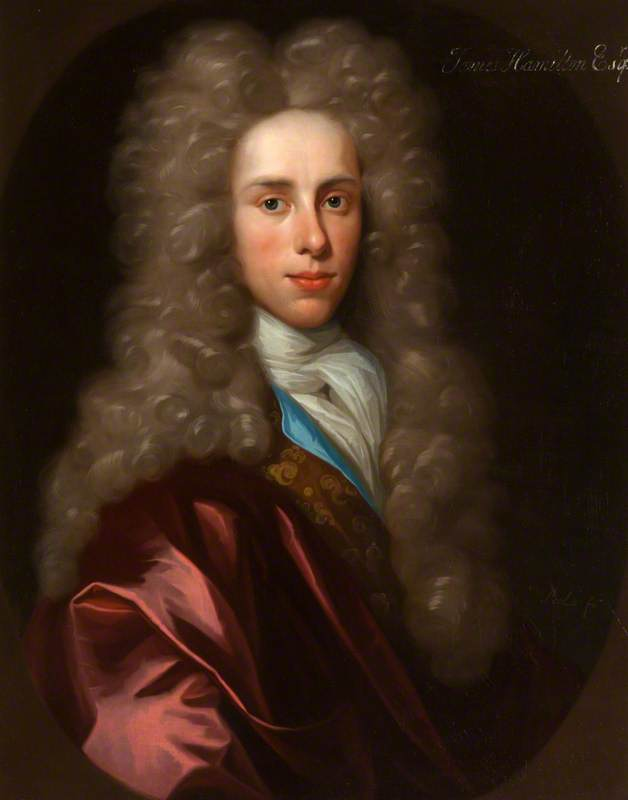
James Hamilton, Lord Pencaitland, by Juriaen Pool

James Hamilton, Lord Pencaitland (28 August 1659 – 30 May 1729) was a Scottish judge and Senator of the College of Justice.

== Life ==
He was born in Edinburgh on 28 August 1659 the son of judge, Robert Hamilton, Lord Presmennan and his wife Marion Denholm.

Trained as a lawyer, he was created a Writer to the Signet in February 1683. In 1698 he bought the Pencaitland estate east of Edinburgh. There he built Pencaitland House (destroyed by fire in 1878). In November 1712 he was elected a Senator of the College of Justice in place of Dugald Stewart, Lord Blairhall and adopted the title "Lord Pencaitland".

In 1726 he stood down from most roles due to gout. He died in Edinburgh on 30 May 1729. His position as Senator was filled by John Pringle, Lord Haining.

== Artistic recognition ==
His portrait, by Juriaen Pool, is stored at the Scottish National Portrait Gallery.
