= Louie Annesley =

Professional footballer

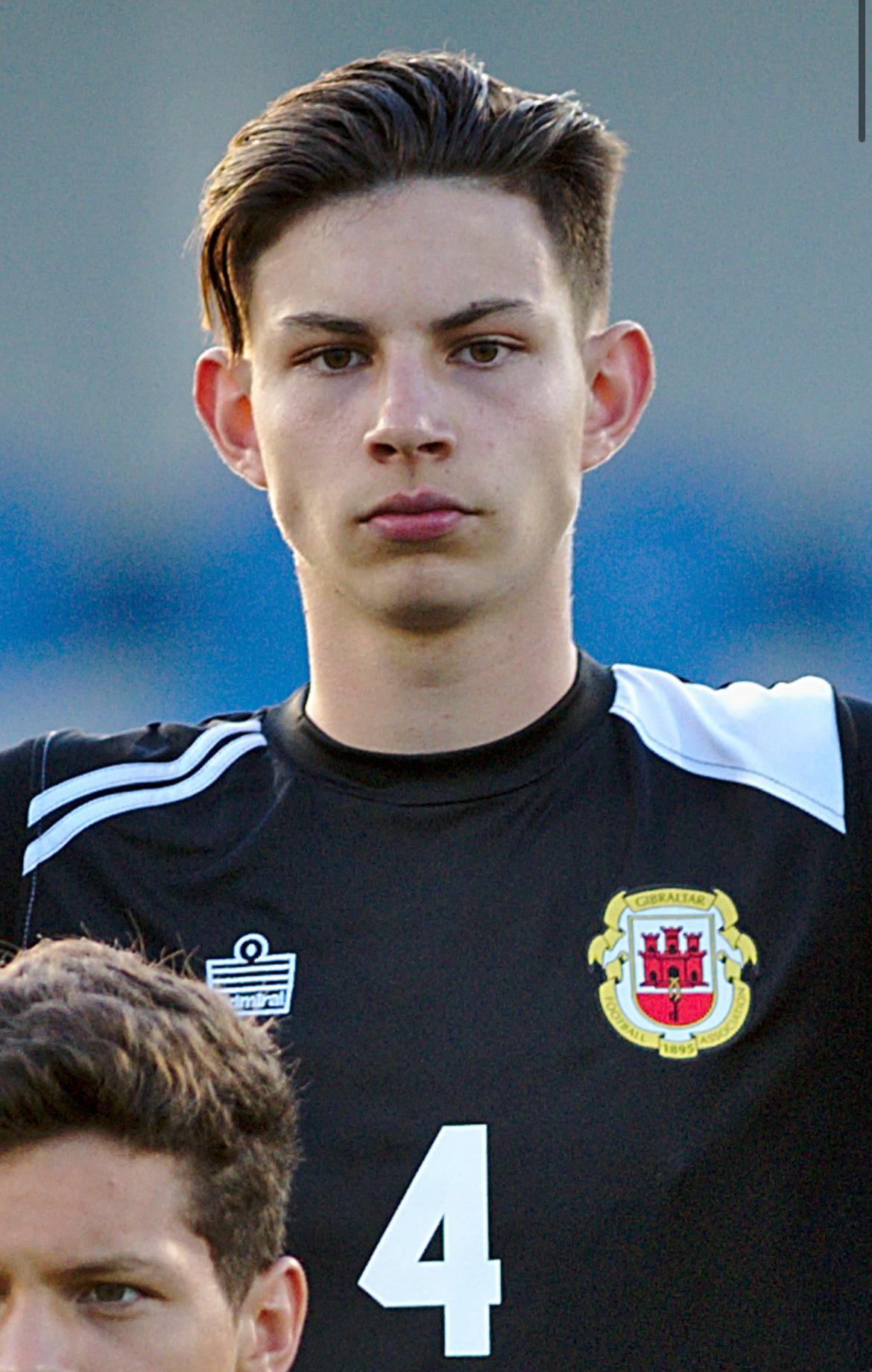

Personal information
- Full name: Louie John Annesley
- Date of birth: 3 May 2000 (age 26)
- Place of birth: St Helier, London, England
- Height: 1.93 m (6 ft 4 in)
- Positions: Centre-back; defensive midfielder

Team information
- Current team: Dorking Wanderers
- Number: 46

Youth career
- –2015: Chelsea
- 2015–2016: AFC Wimbledon
- 2017–2018: Barnet

Senior career*
Years	Team	Apps	(Gls)
2016–2017	Cobham	10	(0)
2017–2018	Barnet	0	(0)
2018–2019	Lincoln Red Imps	3	(0)
2019–2023	Blackburn Rovers	0	(0)
2021–2022	→ Woking (loan)	18	(0)
2022	→ Barnet (loan)	1	(0)
2023–2024	Dundalk	19	(2)
2024–2025	Braintree Town	42	(2)
2025–	Dorking Wanderers	47	(2)

International career^{‡}
2015	Gibraltar U16	3	(1)
2015–2016	Gibraltar U17	5	(0)
2016	Gibraltar U19	3	(0)
2017–2018	Gibraltar U21	8	(0)
2018–	Gibraltar	58	(1)
- * Club domestic league appearances and goals as of 17:15, 21 November 2026 (UTC) ‡ National team caps and goals as of 17:10, 18 November 2026 (UTC)

Louie John Annesley (born 3 May 2000) is a professional footballer who plays as a centre-back for National League South club Dorking Wanderers. He plays for the Gibraltar national team. For the national team, he has also been utilised as a holding midfielder.

== Club career ==
=== Early career ===
Born in St. Helier, London, Annesley spent time with both AFC Wimbledon and Chelsea. Annesley started his senior career at non-League side Cobham, breaking into the senior side and making ten appearances in his only season at the club in the Combined Counties Football League. This attracted the attention of Barnet, who signed him to their academy in 2017. He left in early 2018, signing for Gibraltar Premier Division champions Lincoln Red Imps in July 2018. He made his debut on 26 July 2018 in the UEFA Europa League first leg against The New Saints.

=== Blackburn Rovers and loans ===
In January 2019, despite only playing three league games for the Red Imps and primarily featuring in their Intermediate League squad, he signed for EFL Championship side Blackburn Rovers on a deal until June 2021, initially to play in their development side. Annesley made his Rovers under-23 debut on 4 February, coming off the bench for the final 18 minutes of his side's 7–1 victory over Leicester City in the Premier League 2. He picked up his first piece of silverware at Rovers on 7 May 2019, when he started in the 2–0 Lancashire Senior Cup final victory over local rivals Burnley. He captained the U23s for the first time on 8 March 2021, also scoring his first goal in a 5–1 win over Southampton B in the Premier League 2. In June 2021, he signed a new two-year contract with the club.

On 29 October 2021, Annesley joined National League side, Woking on loan until 4 December 2021 and made his debut a day later, in a 3–2 home victory over Altrincham, playing the full 90 minutes. On 6 December 2021, his loan was extended for a further month until the new year, following five first-team appearances. On 5 January 2022, Annesley's loan was extended once more, this time until the end of the current campaign. On 25 January 2022, during a 1–0 away defeat to Bromley, Annesley was sent off for the first time in his playing career, receiving two yellows in the space of two minutes.

In the 2022–23 season, Annesley was elevated to the first team squad for the first time, being given the number 39 shirt. He made his debut in the Carabao Cup second round tie against Bradford City on 23 August 2022, playing the full game and making a crucial late block to ensure a 2–1 victory for Blackburn.

On 22 November 2022, Annesley rejoined National League side, Barnet on loan until 20 December 2022.

=== Dundalk ===
On 10 January 2023, Annesley signed a multi-year contract for League of Ireland Premier Division side Dundalk. After registering an assist on his debut against UCD, he scored his first goal for the club on 3 March in the 15th minute of a 5–0 in over St Patrick's Athletic. However, shortly after the game he was taken ill, spending three weeks in hospital with before returning to light training in April. The illness was later revealed to be sepsis, and caused him to temporarily lose the ability to walk. In a season heavily disrupted by injury, Annesley played 18 games in total, scoring twice.

On 15 March 2024, Annesley was appointed Dundalk captain for the first time in place of injured captain and vice-captain John Mountney and Andy Boyle, in a 0–0 draw with Waterford. However, after the departure of manager Stephen O'Donnell saw him frozen out of the team, and he eventually left the club in June 2024.

=== Return to England ===
On 28 June 2024, Annesley joined newly promoted National League side Braintree Town on a free transfer. He quickly established himself as a regular in the starting XI, scoring twice in 49 games across all competitions as the Iron finished 17th on their return to the 5th tier. However, he left at the end of the season, dropping down a division to join Dorking Wanderers.

== International career ==
Annesley is the first player to have represented Gibraltar at every level from U16 to senior level, first appearing for the under-16 side in March 2015 while on the books at Chelsea. Later that year, he made his debut for the Gibraltar U17 national team, with whom he earned five caps. In 2016, he played three games for the Gibraltar U19 before earning a call up for the first Gibraltar U21 in 2017, with whom he has eight caps to date. Annesley notably made a late goal-line clearance in Gibraltar U21s' 1–0 victory over North Macedonia.

In March 2018, Annesley made his debut for the senior national team, starting at the last minute after an injury to Joseph Chipolina in the warm-up. He was substituted in the second half as they held on for a 1–0 win over Latvia. He earned his second senior cap on 13 October, coming off the bench in another 1–0 victory, this time away at Armenia to win Gibraltar's first competitive points at senior level. He captained the national team for the first time on 22 March 2025, against Montenegro.

== Personal life ==
Annesley was born in St. Helier, London, and was educated at Wimbledon College. Alongside his playing career, he is a coach and analyst with Monster Mentality Sports, a personal football coaching service.

== Career statistics ==
=== Club ===
As of match played 21 November 2026

Appearances and goals by club, season and competition
Club	Season	League			National cup (Note: Includes FA Cup, FAI Cup)		League cup (Note: Includes EFL Cup, National League Cup)		Continental		Other		Total	
Club	Season	Division	Apps	Goals	Apps	Goals	Apps	Goals	Apps	Goals	Apps	Goals	Apps	Goals
Cobham	2016–17	Combined Counties League Division One	10	0	0	0	—		—		0	0	10	0
Barnet	2017–18	League Two	0	0	0	0	0	0	—		0	0	0	0
Lincoln Red Imps	2018–19	Gibraltar Premier Division	3	0	0	0	—		1 (Note: Appearance in UEFA Europa League)	0	0	0	4	0
Blackburn Rovers	2018–19	Championship	0	0	0	0	0	0	—		—		0	0
Blackburn Rovers	2019–20	Championship	0	0	0	0	0	0	—		—		0	0
Blackburn Rovers	2020–21	Championship	0	0	0	0	0	0	—		—		0	0
Blackburn Rovers	2021–22	Championship	0	0	0	0	0	0	—		—		0	0
Blackburn Rovers	2022–23	Championship	0	0	0	0	1	0	—		—		1	0
Blackburn Rovers	Total		0	0	0	0	1	0	—		—		1	0
Woking (loan)	2021–22	National League	18	0	—		—		—		4 (Note: Three appearances and one goal in Surrey Senior Cup, one appearance in FA Trophy)	1	22	1
Barnet (loan)	2022–23	National League	1	0	1	0	—		—		2 (Note: One appearance in Middlesex Senior Cup, one appearance in FA Trophy)	0	4	0
Dundalk	2023	LOI Premier Division	14	2	1	0	—		3 (Note: Appearances in UEFA Europa Conference League)	0	0	0	18	2
Dundalk	2024	LOI Premier Division	5	0	—		—		—		1 (Note: Appearance in Leinster Senior Cup)	0	6	0
Dundalk	Total		19	2	1	0	—		3	0	1	0	24	2
Braintree Town	2024–25	National League	42	2	1	0	5	0	—		1 (Note: Appearance in FA Trophy)	0	49	2
Dorking Wanderers	2025–26	National League South	32	2	3	0	—		—		1	0	36	2
Dorking Wanderers	2026–27	National League South	15	0	2	0	—		—		0	0	17	0
Dorking Wanderers	Total		47	2	5	0	—		—		1	0	53	2
Dorking Wanderers B	2025–26	Southern Combination League Division One	0	0	—		—		—		1 (Note: Appearance in Southern Combination League Division One Cup)	0	1	0
Career total			140	6	8	0	6	0	4	0	10	1	168	7

=== International ===
As of match played 16 November 2026

Appearances and goals by national team and year
National team	Year	Apps	Goals
Gibraltar U17	2015	3	0
Gibraltar U17	2016	2	0
Total		5	0
Gibraltar U19	2016	3	0
Total		3	0
Gibraltar U21	2017	6	0
Gibraltar U21	2018	2	0
Total		8	0
Gibraltar	2018	3	0
Gibraltar	2019	6	0
Gibraltar	2020	6	0
Gibraltar	2021	10	0
Gibraltar	2022	10	1
Gibraltar	2023	4	0
Gibraltar	2024	9	0
Gibraltar	2025	7	0
Gibraltar	2026	3	0
Total		58	1

== International goals ==
No.	Date	Venue	Opponent	Score	Result	Competition
1.	26 September 2022	Victoria Stadium, Gibraltar	Georgia	1–2	1–2	2022–23 UEFA Nations League

== Honours ==
Blackburn Rovers

- Lancashire Senior Cup: 2018–19, 2019–20
