= Patrick Scougal =

Scottish churchman (1607–1682)

- Bishop of Aberdeen
- Church: Church of Scotland
- See: Diocese of Aberdeen
- In office: 1664–1682
- Predecessor: Alexander Burnet
- Successor: George Haliburton

Orders
- Consecration: 11 April 1664, St Andrews

Personal details
- Born: 1607 Haddingtonshire
- Died: 16 February 1682 Aberdeen

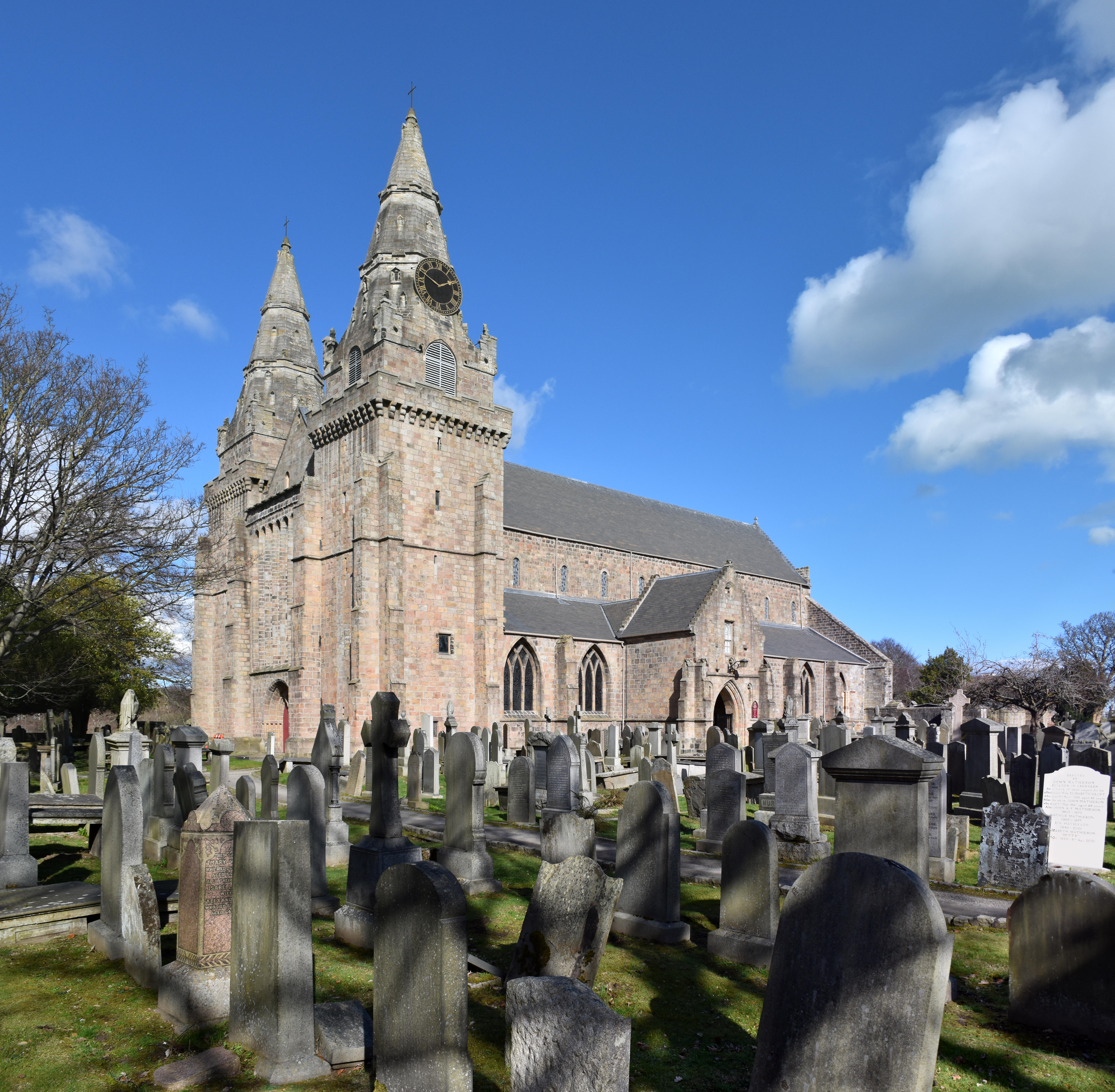
St Machar's Cathedral, Aberdeen

Patrick Scougal (1607–1682) was a Scottish churchman who served as Bishop of Aberdeen from 1664.

== Life ==
He was born in Haddingtonshire (now East Lothian), son of Sir John Scougal of Scougal, and a cousin of the painter John Scougal, in 1624 he graduated from the University of Edinburgh as Master of Arts. In 1636, he became a minister of Dairsie parish, Fife, moving on to Leuchars in 1645 and then to Saltoun, near Haddington, in 1659. He refused an offer to become Professor of Divinity at Edinburgh University in 1662.

In this period, Scougal showed himself to be an extremely religious ideologue, preaching against papists and playing a leading role in the national witchhunt of the 1660s. However, his views on episcopacy became clear when in early 1664 he was offered and accepted the post of Bishop of Aberdeen. Perhaps because of his known and well-established religious fervour, hostility to Scougal's newly shown pro-episcopacy sentiments was comparatively muted. In the same year, Scougal became chancellor of King's College, Aberdeen.

Scougal took an active role in the suppression of Quakerism and was part of a prosecution of James Gordon, the parson of Banchory-Devenick, who had written the Catholic-leaning theological tract called The Reformed Bishop (1679). Scougal was also charitable, and undertook many charitable deeds, including raising money for two Polish Protestant students. When he died (aged seventy-three) of asthma on 16 February 1682, he left much of his wealth to the hospital of Old Aberdeen, King's College Library and Aberdeen Cathedral.

Bishop Scougall was interred in St Machar's Cathedral in Old Aberdeen. His mural monument, a large 3-dimensional tomb in the south-west corner of the nave, is a notable example of 17th-century Scottish neo-classical design, including a 'portrait' of Scougal (see above), and a rich array of symbolic ornament, including Scougal and his wife naked, united by "king death".

== Personal life ==
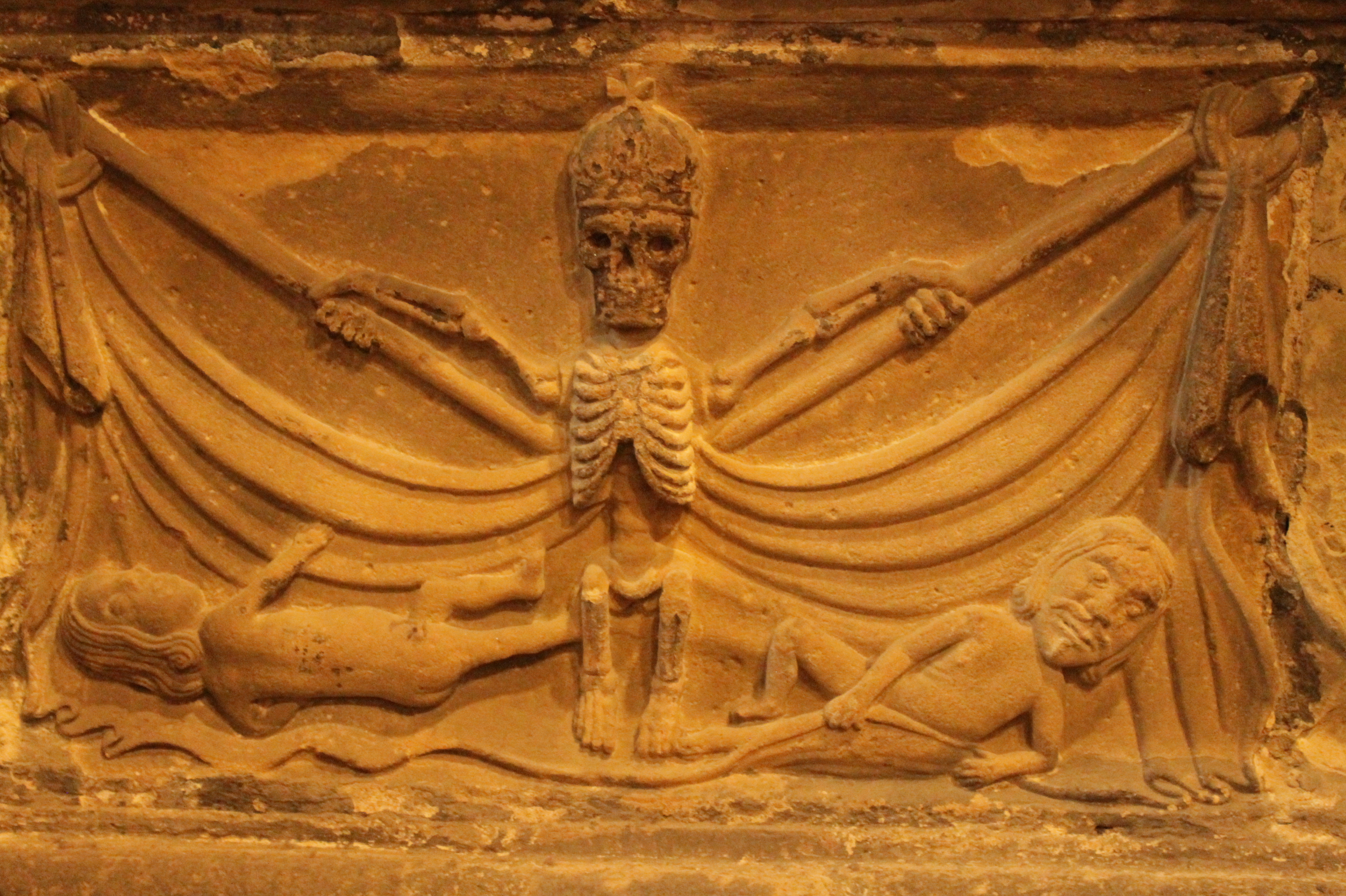
King Death uniting Patrick Scougal with his wife, St Machar's Cathedral

Scougal married firstly, Margaret Wemyss, and by her had five children, including the famous minister Henry Scougal. His second wife was Anna, daughter of William Congalton of that Ilk, widow of Robert Lauder of Gunsgreen (near Eyemouth, Berwickshire). Their son, John Scougal was Provost of Old Aberdeen.

By his second wife, Jean Wemyss (possibly Margaret's sister), he had a daughter Katherine who married Bishop William Scrogie.

His daughter Joanna Scougal married Rev Prof Patrick Sibbald (d. 1697) of Marischal College.

His son Henry Scougal (1650-1678) was Professor of Divinity at King's College, Aberdeen from 1674 to 1678.

His son James Scougal became a senator of the College of Justice.

Church of Scotland titles
Preceded by Alexander Burnet	Bishop of Aberdeen; 1664–1682	Succeeded by George Haliburton
