= Leuchars =

Coordinates: 56.3814°N 2.8835°W

Leuchars: Scottish Gaelic: Luachar
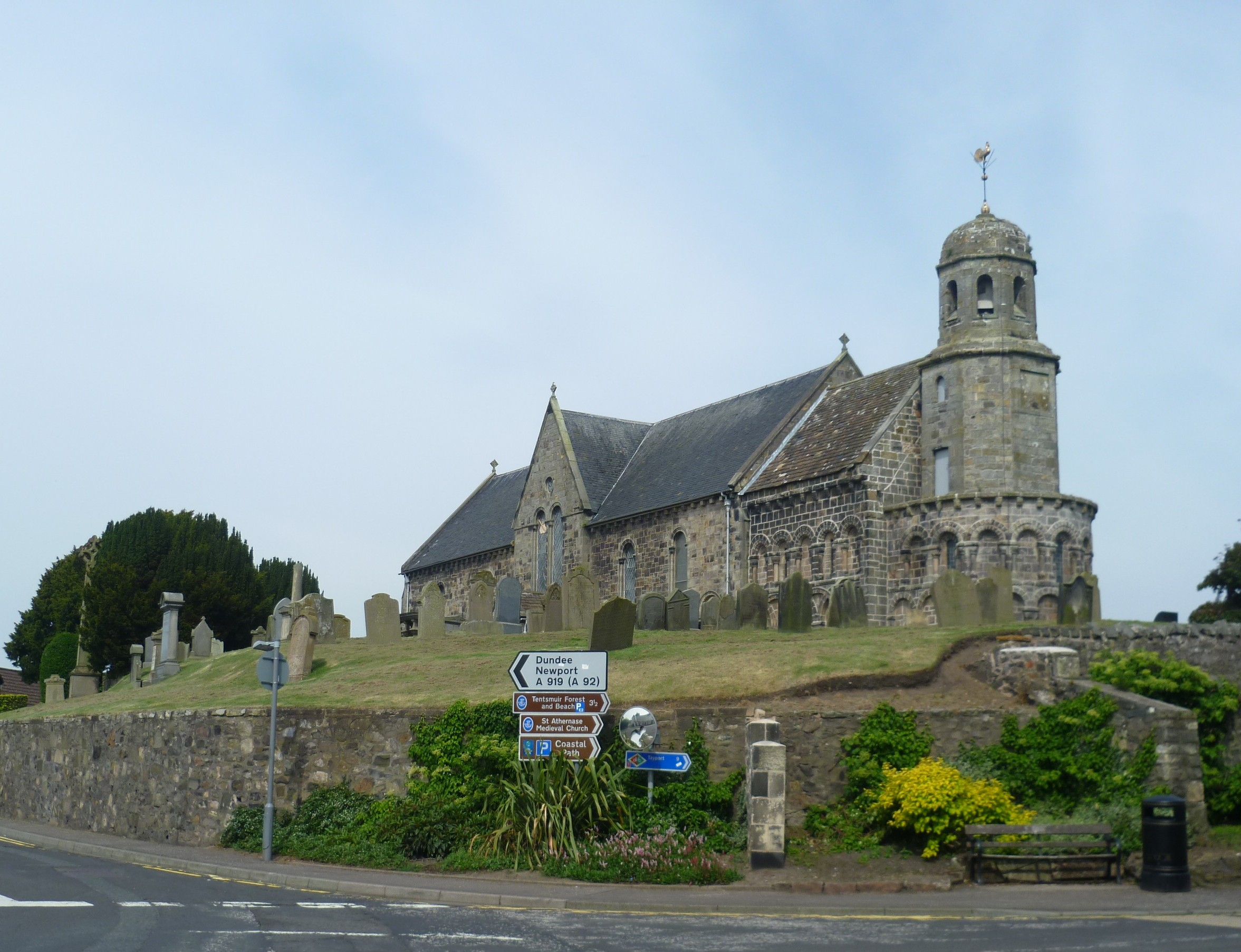
- St Athernase Church in Leuchars

- Location within Fife
- Population: 3,160 (2020)
- OS grid reference: NO455215
- Council area: Fife
- Lieutenancy area: Fife
- Country: Scotland
- Sovereign state: United Kingdom
- Post town: ST ANDREWS
- Postcode district: KY16
- Dialling code: 01334
- Police: Scotland
- Fire: Scottish
- Ambulance: Scottish
- UK Parliament: North East Fife
- Scottish Parliament: North East Fife

Leuchars (pronounced /ˈluːxərs/ or /ˈluːkərz/; Scottish Gaelic: Luachar "rushes") is a town and parish near the north-east coast of Fife in Scotland.

The civil parish has a population of 5,754 (in 2011) and an area of 13,357 acres (5,405 hectares).

== History ==
The name of the town derives from the Scottish Gaelic, Luachair, meaning "rushes", with an archaic Gaelic suffix -es that means "a place of", giving Luachaires, or "The Place of the Rushes". The Barony of Leuchars is recorded during the reign of William the Lion (1165–1214). The 12th-century St Athernase Church is one of the finest surviving examples of an unaisled Romanesque parish church in Scotland. The church has two levels of blind arcading in the Norman style running round the exterior, surmounted by a corbel table with heads of various designs. The interior has elaborate chancel and apse arches, and a series of powerful beast-heads on the corbels supporting the ribs of the internal vaults. The nave has been rebuilt, while the apse roof is crowned by a small bell-tower added in the 17th century. The medieval Leuchars Castle was located to the north of the town: it was demolished in the 19th century but the motte can still be seen, as well as a nearby doocot.

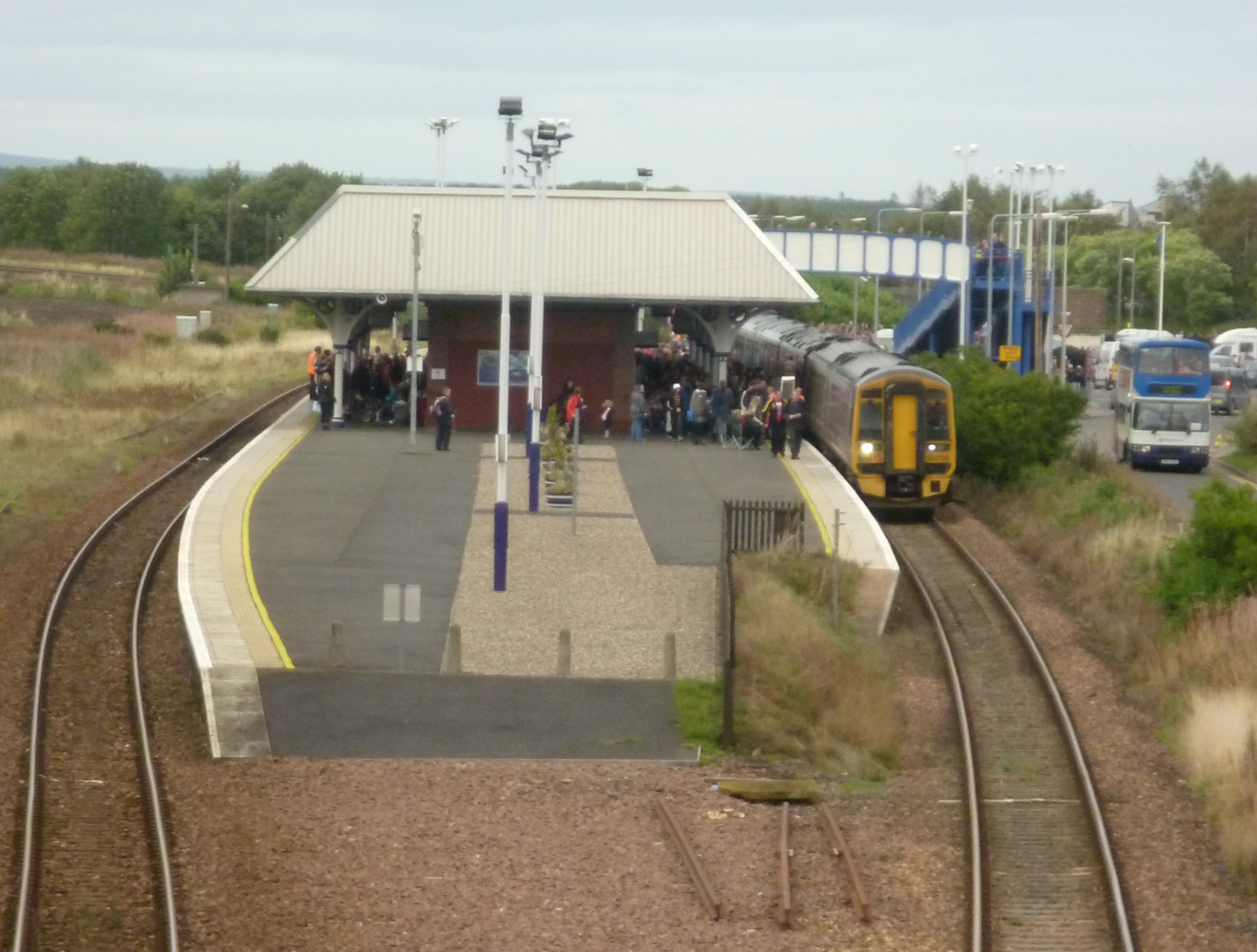
Leuchars Station

The surrounding area was improved by drainage in the 18th century. In the 19th century, a railway station on the line from Edinburgh to Aberdeen brought increased prosperity to the town. When the St Andrews Railway branch line was closed in the late 1960s, Leuchars became the closest place to get the train to St Andrews. Since then, Leuchars railway station has been used by many University of St Andrews students. In 1911 construction started on what would become RAF Leuchars. This Royal Air Force station would host a great variety of aircraft in its time, protecting the North of the United Kingdom from airborne threats until the final QRA (Quick Reaction Alert) aircraft of 1 Squadron departed RAF Leuchars in September 2014. The Station has since been handed over to the Army as of March 2015. The station remains an RAF diversion airfield for aircraft in distress and QRA aircraft from RAF Lossiemouth.

== Notable residents ==
- Rev Patrick Scougal served as Parish Minister between 1645 and 1659, later becoming Bishop of Aberdeen. He raised his sons, Henry Scougal and James Scougal, Lord Whitehill, in Leuchars.

== Geography ==
The town is located near the north-eastern coast of Fife. The town has a population of 3,060.

The town is nearly 2 miles (3 km) to the north of the village of Guardbridge, which lies on the north bank of the River Eden where it widens to the Edenmouth estuary before joining the North Sea at St Andrews Bay. Leuchars is 7 1/2 miles (12 km) north-east of Cupar and 6 miles (10 km) north-west from the university town of St Andrews. The city of Dundee is 7 miles (11 km) to the north, across the rail and road bridges that span the Firth of Tay.

The town had an adjoining Royal Air Force base, RAF Leuchars, which was established in 1920, and was home to the Eurofighter Typhoon. In 2015, the RAF base became an Army base, as the regimental headquarters of 2 Close Support Battalion REME and the Royal Scots Dragoon Guards, who saw their return to Scotland after 20 years in Germany, as coming home.

=== Climate ===
Leuchars has an oceanic climate, like most of Western Europe. On average, Leuchars gets around 700 mm (28 in) of rain each year and 1,573 hours of sunshine, making it one of the driest and sunniest places in Scotland. The highest recorded temperature was 31.3 °C (88.3 °F) on 19 July 2022, while the lowest was −14.5 °C (5.9 °F), which was recorded on 1 February 1972.

Climate data for Leuchars (10 m or 33 ft asl, averages 1991–2020, extremes 1956-present)
Month	Jan	Feb	Mar	Apr	May	Jun	Jul	Aug	Sep	Oct	Nov	Dec	Year
Record high °C (°F)	14.2 (57.6)	15.5 (59.9)	21.4 (70.5)	23.6 (74.5)	26.2 (79.2)	29.1 (84.4)	31.3 (88.3)	30.8 (87.4)	26.8 (80.2)	23.2 (73.8)	17.1 (62.8)	14.9 (58.8)	31.3 (88.3)
Mean daily maximum °C (°F)	6.8 (44.2)	7.7 (45.9)	9.6 (49.3)	11.8 (53.2)	14.5 (58.1)	17.1 (62.8)	19.3 (66.7)	19.0 (66.2)	16.8 (62.2)	13.2 (55.8)	9.5 (49.1)	7.0 (44.6)	12.7 (54.9)
Daily mean °C (°F)	3.8 (38.8)	4.3 (39.7)	5.8 (42.4)	7.8 (46.0)	10.3 (50.5)	13.1 (55.6)	15.1 (59.2)	14.9 (58.8)	12.9 (55.2)	9.7 (49.5)	6.2 (43.2)	3.9 (39.0)	9.0 (48.2)
Mean daily minimum °C (°F)	0.7 (33.3)	1.0 (33.8)	2.0 (35.6)	3.8 (38.8)	6.1 (43.0)	9.1 (48.4)	10.9 (51.6)	10.7 (51.3)	9.0 (48.2)	6.2 (43.2)	2.9 (37.2)	0.9 (33.6)	5.3 (41.5)
Record low °C (°F)	−13.7 (7.3)	−14.5 (5.9)	−11.7 (10.9)	−5.8 (21.6)	−3.0 (26.6)	0.0 (32.0)	2.4 (36.3)	1.7 (35.1)	−0.9 (30.4)	−3.8 (25.2)	−10.2 (13.6)	−13.1 (8.4)	−14.5 (5.9)
Average precipitation mm (inches)	63.5 (2.50)	47.3 (1.86)	46.3 (1.82)	43.9 (1.73)	50.2 (1.98)	62.8 (2.47)	64.3 (2.53)	68.9 (2.71)	53.8 (2.12)	80.4 (3.17)	68.3 (2.69)	63.3 (2.49)	713.0 (28.07)
Average precipitation days (≥ 1.0 mm)	11.9	9.5	9.0	8.3	10.0	10.9	10.9	10.6	9.3	11.7	12.3	11.6	126.0
Mean monthly sunshine hours	61.6	89.6	129.0	168.8	209.4	183.3	185.0	170.9	139.4	104.9	78.5	53.5	1,573.9
Source 1: Met Office
Source 2: Starlings Roost Weather
