= 2022–23 Blackburn Rovers F.C. season =

Blackburn Rovers
2022–23 season
- Owner: Venkys London Ltd
- CEO: Steve Waggott
- Head Coach: Jon Dahl Tomasson
- Stadium: Ewood Park
- Championship: 7th
- FA Cup: Quarter-finals
- EFL Cup: Fourth round
- Top goalscorer: League: Ben Brereton Díaz (14); All: Ben Brereton Díaz (16)
- Highest home attendance: 18,544 vs Norwich City (7 April 2023, Championship)
- Lowest home attendance: 11,803 vs Watford (13 September 2022, Championship)
Home colours	Away colours	Third colours
- All statistics correct as of 8 May 2023.

The 2022–23 season is the 135th season in the existence of Blackburn Rovers Football Club and the club's fifth consecutive season in the Championship. In addition to the league, they also competed in the FA Cup and the EFL Cup.

== Season summary ==
=== Pre-season ===
On 5 May, Rovers confirmed their first pre-season friendly fixture, with the club to set play Scottish Premier League champions Celtic on 16 July at Celtic Park. A week later, on 12 May, Rovers confirmed the second game of their pre-season campaign, this time against EFL League Two side Hartlepool United, set to take place on 20 July at Victoria Park. Blackburn also confirmed fixtures against EFL League One opposition Accrington Stanley and Lincoln City, with both friendlies to take place away from home, with Rovers visiting Stanley's Crown Ground on 9 July and Lincoln's Sincil Bank Stadium on 23 July.

=== May ===
On 1 May 2022, Rovers announced u23 striker Sam Burns had signed a new one-year contract.

On 11 May 2022, Rovers announced manager Tony Mowbray will be leaving the club.

On 20 May 2022, Rovers confirmed their retained list for the 2022–23 season. The club confirmed it had activated the additional-year clauses in the contracts of Ben Brereton Diaz, Dan Butterworth, Tyler Magloire and Jordan Eastham, with the players now under contract at the club until 30 June 2023. Meanwhile, the club confirmed it had opted against offering deals to retain Bradley Johnson, Jacob Davenport, Harry Chapman, Luke Brennan, Connor McBride, Sam Durrant and Joe Nolan, whilst scholars Joe Ferguson, Brandon Lonsdale and Evan Cunningham were not offered professional deals, with all of the players to leave Rovers upon the expiration of their contracts on 30 June. Blackburn also confirmed Joe Rothwell would be departing the club, with Rothwell confirming his intention to leave at the end of his contract.

On 24 May 2022, Rovers announced assistant manager Mark Venus will be leaving the club.

On 25 May 2022, Rovers announced the appointment of Mark Burton as the club's new Under-23s assistant coach.

On 26 May 2022, Rovers announced u23 midfielder Isaac Whitehall had signed a new one-year contract with the option of a further 12 months.

=== June ===
On 8 June 2022, Rovers announced the appointment of Gregg Broughton as Director of Football.

On 14 June 2022, Rovers announced the appointment of Jon Dahl Tomasson as our new Head Coach on a contract till June 2025. He will be joined by new assistant coach Remy Reynierse and performance director Ben Rosen.

On 15 June 2022, Rovers announced that Head of Academy coach Tony Carss would be leaving the club to take up a position at Aston Villa.

On 21 June 2022, Rovers Rovers announced u23 defender Patrick Gamble had signed his 1st professional a one-year deal until 2023 . Rovers also announced that Head of Recruitment John Park would be leaving the club. It was also announced by the club the same day that several additions to the Recruitment department had been made, with Tom Sutton (Oxford United F.C.) and Karl Newton (Stockport County) joining Anthony Bates at the club.

On 22 June 2022, Rovers announced u23 defender George Pratt had signed his 1st professional contract a two-year deal until 2024.

On 23 June 2022, Rovers announced u23 defender Jalil Saadi had signed a new contract a two-year deal until 2024, with the option of a further 12 months.

On 24 June 2022, Rovers announced u18 forward Harrison Wood had signed his 1st professional contract a two-year deal until 2024.

On 25 June 2022, Rovers announced u18 goalkeeper Felix Goddard had signed his 1st professional contract a two-year deal until 2024, with the option of a further 12 months.

On 29 June 2022, Rovers announced u18 midfielder Kristi Montgomery had signed his 1st professional contract a two-year deal until 2024, with the option of a further 12 months. Rovers also announced that Chris Renshaw has been promoted to assistant first team goalkeeping/transition coach making the step up from his role as Academy goalkeeping coach.

On 30 June 2022, Rovers announced u18 midfielder Charlie Weston had signed his 1st professional contract a two-year deal until 2024.

=== July ===
On 14 July 2022, Rovers announced u18 defender Jay Haddow had signed his 1st professional contract a two-year deal until 2024, with the option of a further 12 months.

On 22 July 2022, Rovers announced the appointment of Gus Williams as the club’s new Head of Player Recruitment.

=== September ===
On 2 September 2022, Rovers announced midfielder John Buckley had signed a new long term contract a five-year deal until 2027.

On 12 September 2022, Rovers announced midfielder Adam Wharton had signed a new long term contract a five-year deal until 2027.

On 20 September 2022, Rovers announced defender Ashley Phillips had signed his 1st professional contract a three-year deal until 2025.

On 27 September 2022, Rovers announced U23 defender Sam Barnes had signed a new one-year until 2023, with the option of a further 12 months.

=== October ===
On 12 October 2022, Rovers announced the appointment of Jordan McCann as Head of Academy Coaching.

On 24 October 2022, Rovers announced forward Jack Vale had signed a new long term contract a three-year deal until 2025, with the option of a further 12 months.

On 25 October 2022, Rovers announced u21 defender Jake Batty had signed his 1st professional contract a three-year deal until 2025.

=== November ===
On 17 November 2022, Rovers announced u18 midfielder James Edmundson had signed his 1st professional contract a three-year deal until 2025.

On 23 November 2022, Rovers announced the appointment of Adam Collins from Manchester City as Head of Performance Analysis, Also Luke Griffin recently arrived as Head of European Scouting.

=== January ===
On 27 January 2023, Rovers announced u21 midfielder Harley O’Grady-Macken had signed his 1st professional contract a two-&-half-year deal until 2025.

=== March ===
On 1 March 2023, Rovers announced they had been unsuccessful in their attempts to sign Nottingham Forest midfielder Lewis O'Brien and Rochdale midfielder Ethan Brierley.

On 6 March 2023, Rovers announced Gus Williams will be leaving his role as Rovers’ Head of Player Recruitment to return to Wales.

On 21 March 2023, Rovers announced midfielder Jake Garrett had signed a new four-year deal until 2027.

On 22 March 2023, Rovers announced goalkeeper Jordan Eastham had signed a new two-year deal until 2025.

On 28 March 2023, Rovers announced goalkeeper Joe Hilton had signed a new two-year deal until 2025.

On 29 March 2023, Rovers announced defender Scott Wharton had signed a new four-year deal until 2027.

On 30 March 2023, Rovers announced defender Hayden Carter had signed a new four-year deal until 2027.

=== April ===
On 17 April 2023, Rovers announced the appointment of Sean Kimberley as the club’s new Head of Player Recruitment.

=== May ===
On 1 May 2023, Rovers announced Dominic Hyam had been voted Player of the Season he also was voted Players Player of the Season, Adam Wharton was voted Young Player of the Season, Joe Rankin-Costello won the most Man of the Match awards, Hayden Carter was voted Unsung Hero, Sammie Szmodics was voted best Newcomer of the Season & Harry Pickering's goal against Sheffield United was voted Goal of the Season.

On 8 May 2023, Rovers announced forward Ben Brereton Diaz will be leaving the club at the end of his contract on 30 June.

On 12 May 2023, Rovers announced goalkeeper Aynsley Pears had signed a new four-year deal until 2027.

On 16 May 2023, Rovers announced forward Danny Butterworth will be leaving the club at the end of his contract on 30 June.

On 17 May 2023, Rovers announced attacking midfielder Bradley Dack will be leaving the club at the end of his contract on 30 June.

On 18 May 2023, Rovers announced defender Daniel Ayala will be leaving the club at the end of his contract on 30 June.

== Backroom staff ==
Backroom staff last updated on 27 November 2022. List is representative of staff available on rovers.co.uk.

Position	Staff
Director of Football	(England) Gregg Broughton
Head Coach	(Denmark) Jon Dahl Tomasson
Assistant Head Coach	(Netherlands) Remy Reynierse
First Team Coach	(England) David Lowe
Goalkeeping Coach	(England) Ben Benson
First Team Technical Coach & Head of Player Development	(Northern Ireland) Damien Johnson
Performance Director	(England) Ben Rosen
Consultant	(England) Dr Chris Dalton
Head of Medical Services	(England) Andrew Procter
Head of Performance Analysis	(England) Adam Collins
Head of Recruitment	(England) Sean Kimberley
Head of Academy	(England) Stuart Jones
Head of Academy Coaching	(England) Jordan McCann
Under-23s Lead Coach	(England) Mike Sheron
Head of Education & Welfare	(England) Neil Chadwick
Head of Academy Sports Science and Medical	(England) Russ Wrigley
Head of Academy Recruitment	(England) Michael Cribley
Under-18s Lead Coach	(England) Ryan Kidd

== Squad information ==
Players and squad numbers last updated on 8 May 2022. List is representative of players who have made an appearance for the first-team this season and of information available on Rovers.co.uk.

Note: Flags indicate national team as has been defined under FIFA eligibility rules. Players may hold more than one non-FIFA nationality.

No.	Pos.	Nat.	Name	Date of birth & age	Year joined	Contract expires	Joined from	Other	Ref
Goalkeepers
35	GK	(England)	Jordan Eastham	8 September 2001 (age 25)	2018	2025	Academy		
34	GK	(England)	Joe Hilton	11 October 1999 (age 26)	2019	2025	(England) Everton		
1	GK	(Belgium)	Thomas Kaminski	23 October 1992 (age 33)	2020	2025	(Belgium) Gent		
13	GK	(England)	Aynsley Pears	23 April 1998 (age 28)	2020	2027	(England) Middlesbrough		
Defenders
4	DF	(Spain)	Daniel Ayala	7 November 1990 (age 35)	2020	2023	(England) Middlesbrough		
32	DF	(England)	Sam Barnes	10 March 2001 (age 25)	2012	2024 (+1)	Academy	Option for 12 month extension	
40	DF	(England)	Jake Batty	5 April 2005 (age 21)	2021	2025	Academy		
2	DF	(England)	Callum Brittain	12 March 1998 (age 28)	2022	2026	(England) Barnsley		
17	DF	(England)	Hayden Carter	17 December 1999 (age 26)	2014	2027	Academy		
5	DF	(Scotland)	Dominic Hyam	20 December 1995 (age 30)	2022	2025	(England) Coventry City		
15	DF	(England)	Clinton Mola	15 March 2001 (age 25)	2022	2023	(Germany) Stuttgart	On loan from Stuttgart	
3	DF	(England)	Harry Pickering	29 December 1998 (age 27)	2021	2025	(England) Crewe Alexandra		
33	DF	(England)	Ashley Phillips	26 June 2005 (age 21)	2017	2025	Academy		
16	DF	(England)	Scott Wharton	3 October 1997 (age 28)	2010	2027	Academy		
Midfielders
21	MF	(England)	John Buckley	13 October 1999 (age 26)	2006	2027	Academy		
23	MF	(England)	Bradley Dack	31 December 1993 (age 32)	2017	2023 (+1)	(England) Gillingham	Option for 12 month extension	
10	MF	(England)	Tyrhys Dolan	28 December 2001 (age 24)	2020	2024 (+1)	(England) Preston North End	Option for 12 month extension	
7	MF	(England)	Tayo Edun	14 May 1998 (age 28)	2021	2024 (+1)	(England) Lincoln City	Option for 12 month extension	
30	MF	(England)	Jake Garrett	10 March 2003 (age 23)	2013	2027	Academy		
37	MF	(England)	Jared Harlock	20 September 2002 (age 24)	2019	2023	Academy		
19	MF	(Wales)	Ryan Hedges	8 July 1995 (age 31)	2022	2025 (+1)	(Scotland) Aberdeen	Option for 12 month extension	
6	MF	(England)	Tyler Morton	31 October 2002 (age 23)	2022	2023	(England) Liverpool	On loan from Liverpool	
11	MF	(England)	Joe Rankin-Costello	26 July 1999 (age 27)	2014	2024	Academy		
8	MF	(Republic of Ireland)	Sammie Szmodics	24 September 1995 (age 31)	2022	2025 (+1)	(England) Peterborough United	Option for 12 month extension	
14	MF	(Wales)	Sorba Thomas	25 January 1999 (age 27)	2023	2023	(England) Huddersfield Town	On loan from Huddersfield Town	
27	MF	(England)	Lewis Travis	16 October 1997 (age 28)	2014	2026	Academy		
36	MF	(England)	Adam Wharton	2 June 2004 (age 22)	2010	2027	Academy		
Forwards
22	FW	(Chile)	Ben Brereton Diaz	18 April 1999 (age 27)	2018	2023	(England) Nottingham Forest		
9	FW	(England)	Sam Gallagher	15 September 1995 (age 31)	2019	2024 (+1)	(England) Southampton	Option for 12 month extension	
38	FW	(England)	Harry Leonard	12 September 2003 (age 23)	2013	2025	Academy		
18	FW	(England)	Dilan Markanday	20 August 2001 (age 25)	2022	2025 (+1)	(England) Tottenham Hotspur	On loan at Aberdeen, Option for 12 month extension	
29	FW	(Wales)	Jack Vale	3 March 2001 (age 25)	2017	2025 (+1)	Academy	Option for 12 month extension	

== Transfers ==
=== In ===
Date	Pos	Player	Transferred from	Fee	Ref	Other
1 July 2022 (Note: The transfer was announced on 30 May, and would become official on 1 July once his Preston North End contract expired)	LW	(England) Ethan Walker	(England) Preston North End	Free Transfer		Signed for Blackburn Rovers U23's
21 July 2022	RB	(England) Callum Brittain	(England) Barnsley	Undisclosed		
1 August 2022	CAM	(Republic of Ireland) Sammie Szmodics	(England) Peterborough United	Undisclosed		
28 August 2022	CB	(Scotland) Dominic Hyam	(England) Coventry City	Undisclosed		

=== Out ===
Date	Pos	Player	Transferred to	Fee	Ref
30 June 2022	LM	(England) Luke Brennan	(England) (Wigan Athletic)	Released	
30 June 2022	RM	(England) Harry Chapman	(England) (Bradford City)	Released	
30 June 2022	CF	(Scotland) Evan Cunningham	(England) (Atherton Collieries)	Released	
30 June 2022	CM	(England) Jacob Davenport	(England) (Lincoln City)	Released	
30 June 2022	CAM	(England) Sam Durrant	(England) (Sheffield Wednesday)	Released	
30 June 2022	RB	(England) Joe Ferguson	(England) (Matlock Town)	Released	
30 June 2022	CM	(England) Bradley Johnson	(England) (Milton Keynes Dons)	Released	
30 June 2022	CB	(Republic of Ireland) Darragh Lenihan	(England) (Middlesbrough)	Rejected contract	
30 June 2022	CF	(England) Brandon Lonsdale	(England) (Nelson)	Released	
30 June 2022	CAM	(Scotland) Connor McBride	(Scotland) (Raith Rovers)	Released	
30 June 2022	RB	(Namibia) Ryan Nyambe	(England) (Wigan Athletic)	End of Contract (player & club failed to reach agreement)	
30 June 2022	CM	(England) Joe Nolan	(England) (Chorley)	Released	
30 June 2022	CM	(England) Joe Rothwell	(England) (Bournemouth)	Released	
1 July 2022 (Note: The transfer was announced on 27 May, and would become official on 1 July once the transfer window opened)	GK	(Greece) Antonis Stergiakis	(Greece) Panetolikos	Free transfer	
28 July 2022	CB	(England) Tyler Magloire	(England) Northampton Town	Undisclosed	
10 January 2023	CB	(Gibraltar) Louie Annesley	(Republic of Ireland) Dundalk	Free Transfer	

† Brackets around club names indicate the player joined that club after his Blackburn Rovers contract expired.

=== Loans in ===
Date	Pos	Player	Loaned from	On loan until	Ref	Other
1 August 2022	CM	(England) Tyler Morton	(England) Liverpool	End of Season		
31 August 2022	CF	(England) George Hirst	(England) Leicester City	End of Season (Recalled)		Includes option to buy
1 September 2022	CB	(England) Clinton Mola	(Germany) Stuttgart	End of Season		Includes option to buy
25 January 2023	RW	(Wales) Sorba Thomas	(England) Huddersfield Town	End of Season		

=== Loans out ===
Date	Pos	Player	Loaned to	On loan until	Ref	Other
2 July 2022	GK	(England) Felix Goddard	(England) Bamber Bridge	1 January 2023		
29 July 2022	RB	(Republic of Ireland) James Brown	(England) Stockport County	End of Season (Recalled)		
29 July 2022	GK	(England) Jordan Eastham	(England) Lancaster City	Youth Loan		
1 September 2022	CF	(England) Daniel Butterworth	(England) Port Vale	End of Season		
22 November 2022	CB	(Gibraltar) Louie Annesley	(England) Barnet	One Month Loan		Includes option to buy
17 January 2023	RB	(Republic of Ireland) James Brown	(England) Doncaster Rovers	End of Season		
31 January 2023	RW	(England) Dilan Markanday	(Scotland) Aberdeen	End of Season		
7 March 2023	RB	(England) Dan Pike	(England) AFC Fylde	2 months		
9 March 2023	GK	(England) Felix Goddard	(England) Bamber Bridge	End of Season		

== Pre-season and friendlies ==
Rovers announced the first of their pre-season friendly matches with a visit to Scotland to face Celtic on 16 July. On their return to England they travel to Hartlepool United on 20 July. On 16 May, a match with Lincoln City was scheduled for 23 July. A day later a fourth fixture was announced, with a trip to Accrington Stanley scheduled for 9 July 2022. On 15 June, a friendly date with Dundee was confirmed. On 29 November, a friendly against Ajax was confirmed. On 30 November, a friendly against Hearts was confirmed.

Win Draw Loss Fixtures

9 July 2022 Friendly	Accrington Stanley	1–0	Blackburn Rovers	Accrington
15:00 BST	Lowe 52'	Report		Stadium: Wham Stadium
Note: Match one of two 60-minute matches

9 July 2022 Friendly	Accrington Stanley	0–2	Blackburn Rovers	Accrington
16:30 BST		Report	Vale 40'; Dolan 45'	Stadium: Wham Stadium
Note: Match two of two 60-minute matches

13 July 2022 Friendly	Dundee	1–1	Blackburn Rovers	Dundee, Scotland
19:45 BST	Jakubiak 36'	Report	Trialist 33' (o.g.)	Stadium: Kilmac Stadium; Attendance: 1,387

16 July 2022 Friendly	Celtic	2–2	Blackburn Rovers	Parkhead, Scotland
12:30 BST	Jota 16'; Turnbull 27'	Report	Gallagher 1'; Brereton Díaz 75'	Stadium: Celtic Park

20 July 2022 Friendly	Hartlepool United	0–1	Blackburn Rovers	Hartlepool
19:30 BST		Report	Vale 79'	Stadium: The Suit Direct Stadium; Attendance: 1,512

23 July 2022 Friendly	Lincoln City	0–1	Blackburn Rovers	Lincoln
15:00 BST		Report	Dack 46'	Stadium: LNER Stadium

2 December 2022 Friendly	Blackburn Rovers	4–0	Heart of Midlothian	Málaga
14:00 BST	Szmodics 4'; Phillips (yellow card) 15'; Hirst 22', 31'; Mola (yellow card) 40'; Dack 53'; Travis (yellow card) 89'	Report		Stadium: Marbella Football Centre

3 December 2022 Friendly	Blackburn Rovers	2–0	Ajax	Málaga
10:00 BST	Dolan 55', 75'; Buckley (yellow card) 75'; Carter (yellow card) 85'	Report		Stadium: Marbella Football Centre

== Competitions ==
=== Overall record ===
Competition	First match	Last match	Starting round	Record							
Competition	First match	Last match	Starting round	Pld	W	D	L	GF	GA	GD	Win %
Championship	August 2022	May 2023	Matchday 1	46	20	9	17	52	54	−2	43.48
FA Cup	8 January 2023	19 March 2023	Third round	5	3	1	1	8	6	+2	60.00
EFL Cup	10 August 2022	20 December 2022	First round	4	2	1	1	9	7	+2	50.00
Total				55	25	11	19	69	67	+2	45.45

Last updated: 1 May 2023
Source: [ Soccerway]

=== Championship ===
==== League table ====
Pos	Team	Pld	W	D	L	GF	GA	GD	Pts	Promotion, qualification or relegation
4	Middlesbrough	46	22	9	15	84	56	+28	75	Qualification for Championship play-offs
5	Coventry City	46	18	16	12	58	46	+12	70	Qualification for Championship play-offs
6	Sunderland	46	18	15	13	68	55	+13	69	Qualification for Championship play-offs
7	Blackburn Rovers	46	20	9	17	52	54	−2	69	
8	Millwall	46	19	11	16	57	50	+7	68	
9	West Bromwich Albion	46	18	12	16	59	53	+6	66	
10	Swansea City	46	18	12	16	68	64	+4	66	

Source: EFL Official Website
Rules for classification: 1) Points; 2) Goal difference; 3) Number of goals scored; 4) Head-to-head results; 5) Wins; 6) Away goals; 7) Penalty points (sec 9.5); 8) 12-point sending off offences

==== Results summary ====
Overall								Home						Away					
Pld	W	D	L	GF	GA	GD	Pts	W	D	L	GF	GA	GD	W	D	L	GF	GA	GD
45	19	9	17	48	51	−3	66	13	4	6	27	20	+7	6	5	11	21	31	−10

Last updated: 1 May 2023.
Source: [ Soccerway]

==== Results by round ====
Round	1	2	3	4	5	6	7	8	9	10	11	12	13	14	15	16	17	18	19	20	21	22	23	24	25	26	27	28	29	30	31	32	33	34	35	36	37	38	39	40	41	42	43	44	45	46
Ground	H	A	H	A	A	H	A	H	H	A	H	A	H	A	A	H	H	A	A	H	A	H	A	A	H	H	A	A	H	A	A	H	H	A	H	A	H	A	H	A	H	H	A	H	H	A
Result	W	W	W	L	L	L	W	L	W	L	W	L	W	L	W	W	W	W	L	W	L	L	W	L	L	W	L	D	D	D	D	W	W	W	W	L	W	L	L	D	D	D	D	L	D	W
Position	4	1	1	1	4	8	5	7	3	7	6	7	7	7	5	2	2	2	2	2	3	3	3	3	3	3	5	4	7	8	8	7	4	4	4	5	5	6	6	6	6	6	8	9	9	7

Updated to match(es) played on 1 May 2023. Source: [ Soccerway]
A = Away; H = Home; W = Win; D = Draw; L = Loss; P = Postponed

==== Matches ====
Win Draw Loss Fixtures

On 23 June, the league fixtures were announced.

30 July 2022 1	Blackburn Rovers	1–0	Queens Park Rangers	Blackburn
15:00 BST	Buckley (yellow card) 11'; Travis 34'	Report	Dykes (yellow card) 12'	Stadium: Ewood Park; Attendance: 14,315; Referee: Thomas Bramall

6 August 2022 2	Swansea City	0–3	Blackburn Rovers	Swansea, Wales
15:00 BST	Fulton (yellow card) 20'; Piroe (yellow card) 31'; Obafemi (yellow card) 86'	Report	Gallagher (yellow card) 35'; Szmodics 39'; Brereton Díaz 57'; Travis 84'	Stadium: Swansea.com Stadium; Attendance: 16,632; Referee: Stephen Martin

14 August 2022 3	Blackburn Rovers	2–1	West Bromwich Albion	Blackburn
15:00 BST	Gallagher (yellow card) 5', (goal) 47'; Brereton Díaz 41'; Buckley (yellow card) 77'; Dack (yellow card) 89'; Travis (yellow card) 90'	Report	Swift (yellow card) 37'; Diangana 59'	Stadium: Ewood Park; Attendance: 14,970; Referee: Josh Smith

17 August 2022 4	Reading	3–0	Blackburn Rovers	Reading
20:00 BST	McIntyre 14'; Fornah (yellow card) 53'; Holmes (yellow card) 55'; Hoilett 61'; Guinness-Walker (yellow card) 63'; João 78'; Lumley (yellow card) 87'; Loum (yellow card) 90+6'	Report	Pickering (yellow card) 12'; Ayala (yellow card) 55'	Stadium: Select Car Leasing Stadium; Attendance: 11,780; Referee: Keith Stroud

20 August 2022 5	Sheffield United	3–0	Blackburn Rovers	Sheffield
15:00 BST	Norwood 31'; Lowe (yellow card) 41'; Ahmedhodžić (yellow card) 51'; Ndiaye 73', 79', (yellow card) 79'	Report	Gallagher (yellow card) 51'; Brereton Díaz (yellow card) 56'	Stadium: Bramall Lane; Attendance: 27,850; Referee: Leigh Doughty

27 August 2022 6	Blackburn Rovers	0–1	Stoke City	Blackburn
15:00 BST	Rankin-Costello (yellow card) 10'; Travis (yellow card) 41'; Phillips (yellow card) 59'	Report	Baker 27', (yellow card) 90+6'; Gayle (yellow card) 57'; Fosu (yellow card) 83'	Stadium: Ewood Park; Attendance: 13,371; Referee: Leigh Doughty

31 August 2022 7	Blackpool	0–1	Blackburn Rovers	Blackpool
20:00 BST	Thompson (yellow card) 63'; Ekpiteta (yellow card) 84'	Report	Brereton Díaz 16', (yellow card) 24'; Travis (yellow card) 70'; Vale (yellow card) 73'	Stadium: Bloomfield Road; Attendance: 13,383; Referee: Matt Donohue

3 September 2022 8	Blackburn Rovers	2–3	Bristol City	Blackburn
15:00 BST	Wharton (yellow card) 7'; Pickering (yellow card) 67'; Dolan 71'; Brereton Díaz 90+3'	Report	Conway 42'; Wells 55', 73'; James (yellow card) 57'; Scott (yellow card) 58'	Stadium: Ewood Park; Attendance: 12,502; Referee: Tim Robinson

13 September 2022 9	Blackburn Rovers	2–0	Watford	Blackburn
19:45 BST	Hyam (yellow card) 24', (goal) 82'; Hedges 38', (yellow card) 79'	Report		Stadium: Ewood Park; Attendance: 11,803; Referee: Steve Martin

17 September 2022 10	Luton Town	2–0	Blackburn Rovers	Luton
15:00 BST	Morris (yellow card) 41', (goal) 58'; Lockyer (yellow card) 61'; Burke 67'	Report	Travis (yellow card) 45+1'; Brittain (yellow card) 61'	Stadium: Kenilworth Road; Attendance: 9,839; Referee: Josh Smith

1 October 2022 11	Blackburn Rovers	2–1	Millwall	Blackburn
15:00 BST	Dolan 57'; Brereton Díaz 63'; Morton (yellow card) 75'	Report	Cooper 75'	Stadium: Ewood Park; Attendance: 12,164; Referee: David Webb

4 October 2022 12	Cardiff City	1–0	Blackburn Rovers	Leckwith
19:45 BST	Ojo (yellow card) 33'; Sawyers (yellow card) 57'; Harris 83'	Report	Szmodics (yellow card) 34'; Gallagher (yellow card) 84'; Hirst (penalty missed) 90+5'	Stadium: Cardiff City Stadium; Attendance: 16,150; Referee: John Brooks

8 October 2022 13	Blackburn Rovers	3–0	Rotherham United	Blackburn
15:00 BST	Brereton Díaz 21' (pen.) 63'; Szmodics 75'	Report	Hall (yellow card) 20'; Rathbone (yellow card) 54'; Barlaser (yellow card) 90+1'	Stadium: Ewood Park; Attendance: 12,233; Referee: Oliver Langford

11 October 2022 14	Wigan Athletic	1–0	Blackburn Rovers	Wigan
19:45 BST	Naylor (yellow card) 27'; Broadhead 62'; McClean (yellow card) 79'		Brererton Diaz (yellow card) 87'	Stadium: DW Stadium; Attendance: 13,611; Referee: Josh Smith

15 October 2022 15	Middlesbrough	1–2	Blackburn Rovers	Middlesbrough
15:00 BST	Muniz (yellow card) 27'; Watmore 45+1'; McNair (yellow card) 90+5'	Report	Lenihan 4' (o.g.); Gallagher 17'; Travis (yellow card) 27'; Morton (yellow card) 51'; Kaminski (yellow card) 77'; Dolan (yellow card) 90+5'	Stadium: Riverside Stadium; Attendance: 24,213; Referee: Darren Bond

18 October 2022 16	Blackburn Rovers	2–0	Sunderland	Blackburn
19:45 BST	Brereton Díaz 32'; Morton (yellow card) 40'; Wharton 49'; Szmodics (yellow card) 65'; Carter (yellow card) 74'	Report	Pritchard (yellow card) 30'; Cirkin (yellow card) 48'; Bennette (yellow card) 66'	Stadium: Ewood Park; Attendance: 15,171; Referee: Craig Pawson

22 October 2022 17	Blackburn Rovers	2–1	Birmingham City	Blackburn
15:00 BST	Gallagher 17'; Wharton 42'; Vale (yellow card) 90+3'	Report	Sanderson (yellow card) 48'; Hogan 80'	Stadium: Ewood Park; Attendance: 14,092; Referee: Gavin Ward

29 October 2022 18	Hull City	0–1	Blackburn Rovers	Kingston upon Hull
15:00 BST	Woods (yellow card) 29'; Figueiredo (yellow card) 78'	Report	Szmodics 15'; Wharton (yellow card) 61'	Stadium: MKM Stadium; Attendance: 18,843; Referee: David Webb

1 November 2022 19	Coventry City	1–0	Blackburn Rovers	Coventry
19:45 GMT	Allen 41'; Eccles (yellow card) 56'; Palmer (yellow card) 90+3'	Report	Hyam (yellow card) 39'; Wharton (yellow card) 76'; Garrett (red card) 85'; Kaminski (yellow card) 90+3'; Ayala (yellow card) 90+4'	Stadium: The Coventry Building Society Arena; Attendance: 16,530; Referee: Tim Robinson

5 November 2022 20	Blackburn Rovers	1–0	Huddersfield Town	Blackburn
15:00 GMT	Brereton Díaz 35'	Report	Rudoni (yellow card) 36'; Camara (yellow card) 40'; Kasumu (yellow card) 68'	Stadium: Ewood Park; Attendance: 15,179; Referee: James Linington

13 November 2022 21	Burnley	3–0	Blackburn Rovers	Burnley
12:00 GMT	Barnes 55', 81'; Cork (yellow card) 61'; Zaroury 74'	Report	Travis (yellow card) 42'; Ayala (yellow card) 86'	Stadium: Turf Moor; Attendance: 21,747; Referee: David Coote

10 December 2022 22	Blackburn Rovers	1–4	Preston North End	Blackburn
12:00 GMT	Carter (yellow card) 35'; Dack 55'	Report	Woodburn 16'; Evans (yellow card) 44', (goal) 47', 63'; Whiteman 65'; Johnson (yellow card) 90+3'	Stadium: Ewood Park; Attendance: 17,690; Referee: Josh Smith

17 December 2022 23	Norwich City	0–2	Blackburn Rovers	Norwich
17:30 GMT	McLean (yellow card) 57'; Hanley (yellow card) 79'; Pukki (yellow card) 90+1'; Gibson (yellow card) 90+6'	Report	Gibson 4' (o.g.); Ayala (yellow card) 28'; Morton (yellow card) 83'; Dolan 86'; Kaminski (yellow card) 90+1'	Stadium: Carrow Road; Attendance: 25,866; Referee: Paul Tierney

26 December 2022 24	Sunderland	2–1	Blackburn Rovers	Sunderland
12:30 GMT	Stewart 22' (pen.); Cirkin (yellow card) 39'; Hume (yellow card) 60'; Simms 90+1'; Diallo (yellow card) 90+4'	Report	Stewart 18' (o.g.); Morton (yellow card) 25'; Ayala (yellow card) 52'; Buckley (yellow card) 87'; Hirst (yellow card) 90'; Rankin-Costello (yellow card) 90+4'	Stadium: Stadium of Light; Attendance: 43,921; Referee: Darren Bond

29 December 2022 25	Blackburn Rovers	1–2	Middlesbrough	Blackburn
19:45 GMT	Hedges 5'; Buckley (red card) 50'; Hyam (yellow card) 90+4'	Report	Hackney (yellow card) 8'; Forss 46'; Crooks (yellow card) 49'; McGree 56'; Smith (yellow card) 81'	Stadium: Ewood Park; Attendance: 18,128; Referee: Leigh Doughty

1 January 2023 26	Blackburn Rovers	1–0	Cardiff City	Blackburn
12:00 GMT	Garrett (yellow card) 13'; Dack 48'; Hedges (yellow card) 49'; Wharton (yellow card) 65'	Report	Simpson (yellow card) 28'; Harris (yellow card) 65'	Stadium: Ewood Park; Attendance: 12,499; Referee: Thomas Bramall

14 January 2023 27	Rotherham United	4–0	Blackburn Rovers	Rotherham
12:30 GMT	Oddofin 1'; Rathbone 52', (yellow card) 73'; Ferguson 76'; Washington 90+3'	Report		Stadium: AESSEAL New York Stadium; Attendance: 10,345; Referee: Dean Whitestone

21 January 2023 28	Bristol City	1–1	Blackburn Rovers	Ashton Gate
15:00 GMT	Semenyo 68'; Vyner (yellow card) 79'	Report	Ayala (yellow card) 38' (yellow-red card) 74'; Wharton (yellow card) 43'; Dack 54'	Stadium: Ashton Gate; Attendance: 19,882; Referee: Tim Robinson

6 February 2023 29	Blackburn Rovers	0–0	Wigan Athletic	Blackburn
20:00 GMT	Carter (yellow card) 70'; Diaz (yellow card) 84'; Rankin-Costello (yellow card) 88'	Report	McClean (yellow card) 88'	Stadium: Ewood Park; Attendance: 14,540; Referee: Matt Donohue

11 February 2023 30	Watford	1–1	Blackburn Rovers	Watford
15:00 GMT	Choudhury (yellow card) 36'; Hoedt 74'; Kamara (yellow card) 90+3'	Report	Dack 24'; Thomas (yellow card) 31'; Rankin-Costello (yellow card) 59'; Buckley (yellow card) 90'; Gallagher (yellow card) 90+6'	Stadium: Vicarage Road; Attendance: 19,294; Referee: Jeremy Simpson

15 February 2023 31	West Bromwich Albion	1–1	Blackburn Rovers	West Bromwich
20:00 GMT	Albrighton (yellow card) 23'; Pieters (yellow card) 61'; Molumby 73'	Report	Travis (yellow card) 83'; Brereton Díaz 89'	Stadium: The Hawthorns; Attendance: 21,840; Referee: David Webb

18 February 2023 32	Blackburn Rovers	1–0	Swansea City	Blackburn
15:00 GMT	Thomas (yellow card) 15'; Travis (yellow card) 45'; Ayala 89', (yellow card) 90+4'; Dolan (yellow card) 90+5'	Report	Latibeaudiere (yellow card) 51'; Fulton (yellow card) 88'	Stadium: Ewood Park; Attendance: 12,584 (502 away); Referee: Thomas Bramall

21 February 2023 33	Blackburn Rovers	1–0	Blackpool	Blackburn
19:45 GMT	Dolan 31', (yellow card) 49'; Brittain (yellow card) 80'; Buckley (yellow card) 90'	Report		Stadium: Ewood Park; Attendance: 14,483; Referee: Dean Whitestone

25 February 2023 34	Queens Park Rangers	1–3	Blackburn Rovers	Shepherd's Bush
15:00 GMT	Iroegbunam 24'; Johansen (yellow card) 37'; Kakay (yellow card) 57'; Field (yellow card) 59'; Lowe (yellow card) 66'	Report	Gallagher 14', 60'; Szmodics 45+2'	Stadium: Loftus Road Stadium; Attendance: 15,715 (1,139 away); Referee: Leigh Doughty

5 March 2023 35	Blackburn Rovers	1–0	Sheffield United	Blackburn
12:30 GMT	Pickering 5'; Szmodics (yellow card) 71'; Gallagher (yellow card) 77'	Report	Basham (yellow card) 48'; Norwood (yellow card) 67'; Egan (yellow card) 89'	Stadium: Ewood Park; Attendance: 16,646 (3,726 away); Referee: Josh Smith

10 March 2023 36	Stoke City	3–2	Blackburn Rovers	Stoke-On-Trent
20:00 GMT	Hoever 24', 43'; Sterling (yellow card) 69'; Campbell 76'; Brown (yellow card) 83'	Report	Morton (yellow card) 74'; Brereton Diaz (yellow card) 80', (goal) 87'; Gallagher 90'	Stadium: Bet365 Stadium; Attendance: 17,427; Referee: Matt Donohue

15 March 2023 37	Blackburn Rovers	2–1	Reading	Blackburn
19:45 GMT	Brereton Díaz 2'; Rankin-Costello (yellow card) 28'; Hedges 82'; Gallagher (yellow card) 85'	Report	Casadei 68'; Loum (red card) 85'; Lumley (yellow card) 85'; Ehibhatiomhan (yellow card) 89'	Stadium: Ewood Park; Attendance: 14,023 (284 away); Referee: Darren Bond

1 April 2023 38	Birmingham City	1–0	Blackburn Rovers	Bordesley
15:00 BST	Trusty (yellow card) 45+2'; Khadra 61'; Bacuna (yellow card) 89'; Bellingham (yellow card) 90+6'	Report	Dolan (yellow card) 45+2'; Travis (yellow card) 53'; Morton (yellow card) 84'	Stadium: St Andrew's Stadium; Attendance: 16,623 (1,721 away); Referee: Andy Davies

7 April 2023 39	Blackburn Rovers	0–2	Norwich City	Blackburn
15:00 BST	Gallagher (yellow card) 59'	Report	Gibbs 11'; Gibson (yellow card) 34'; Sara 55'; Omobamidele (yellow card) 59'	Stadium: Ewood Park; Attendance: 18,544; Referee: Andre Marriner

10 April 2023 40	Huddersfield Town	2–2	Blackburn Rovers	Huddersfield
12:30 BST	Pearson 16'; Rudoni 22'	Report	Carter (yellow card) 24'; Rankin-Costello (yellow card) 45', (goal) 47'; Szmodics (yellow card) 75'; Hedges 90+1'	Stadium: John Smith's Stadium; Attendance: 20,887; Referee: Stephen Martin

15 April 2023 41	Blackburn Rovers	0–0	Hull City	Blackburn
19:45 BST	Carter (yellow card) 54'	Report	Pelkas (yellow card) 86'; Darlow (yellow card) 90+3'	Stadium: Ewood Park; Attendance: 14,847; Referee: John Busby

19 April 2023 42	Blackburn Rovers	1–1	Coventry City	Blackburn
19:45 BST	Gallagher 39'; Travis (yellow card) 45+4'; Rankin-Costello (yellow card) 80'; Hedges (yellow card) 90+1'	Report	Doyle (yellow card) 90'; Wilson 90+5'	Stadium: Ewood Park; Attendance: 14,728 (2,818 away); Referee: Jeremy Simpson

22 April 2023 43	Preston North End	1–1	Blackburn Rovers	Preston
17:30 BST	Johnson (yellow card) 59'; Hyam 90+4' (o.g.)	Report	Szmodics (yellow card) 60', (goal) 80'; Rankin-Costello (yellow card) 85'	Stadium: Deepdale; Attendance: 20,721; Referee: Rob Jones

25 April 2023 44	Blackburn Rovers	0–1	Burnley	Blackburn
20:00 BST	Rankin-Costello (yellow card) 47'; Pickering (yellow card) 62'; Szmodics (yellow card) 70'	Report	Brownhill (yellow card) 35'; Cullen (yellow card) 53'; Maatsen (yellow card) 57'; Cork (yellow card) 65'; Benson 66'; Muric (yellow card) 85'	Stadium: Ewood Park; Attendance: 18,166; Referee: Tim Robinson

1 May 2023 45	Blackburn Rovers	1–1	Luton Town	Blackburn
17:30 BST	Hyam (yellow card) 72'; Carter 86'; Szmodics (yellow card) 90+4'	Report	Lockyer 50'	Stadium: Ewood Park; Attendance: 17,261; Referee: Darren England

8 May 2023 46	Millwall	3–4	Blackburn Rovers	Bermondsey
15:00 BST	Watmore 8', 37'; Burke 39'; Cooper (yellow card) 64'	Report	Wharton 22'; Rankin-Costello 51'; Brereton Díaz 63', 86'	Stadium: The Den; Attendance: 17,588; Referee: Craig Pawson

=== FA Cup ===
Rovers entered the FA Cup at the third round stage and were drawn away to Norwich City. They were drawn at home to either Forest Green Rovers or Birmingham City in the fourth round.

Win Draw Loss Fixtures

8 January 2023 Third round	Norwich City	0–1	Blackburn Rovers	Norwich
14:00 GMT	Aarons (yellow card) 22'; Hugill (yellow card) 73'	Report	Vale 31'; Carter (yellow card) 53'	Stadium: Carrow Road; Attendance: 20,472; Referee: Gavin Ward

28 January 2023 Fourth round	Blackburn Rovers	2–2	Birmingham City	Blackburn
15:00 GMT	Rankin-Costello (yellow card) 22', (goal) 46'; Dack 33'; Morton (yellow card) 69'; Wharton (yellow card) 80'; Brereton Díaz (yellow card) 86'	Report	Khadra 3'; Chong (yellow card) 40'; James 90+1'	Stadium: Ewood Park; Attendance: 13,687; Referee: Keith Stroud

31 January 2023 Fourth round replay	Birmingham City	0–1 (a.e.t.)	Blackburn Rovers	Birmingham
19:45 GMT	Chong (yellow card) 90+3'; James (yellow card) 120+2'	Report	Buckley (yellow card) 98'; Trusty 100' (o.g.); Brereton Díaz (yellow card) 107'; Travis (yellow card) 114'	Stadium: St Andrew's; Attendance: 7,183; Referee: Stephen Martin

28 February 2023 Fifth round	Leicester City	1–2	Blackburn Rovers	Leicester
19:45 GMT	Thomas (yellow card) 16'; Iheanacho 67', (yellow card) 83'; Mendy (yellow card) 90+4'	Report	Dolan 33'; Szmodics 52', (yellow card) 83'	Stadium: King Power Stadium; Attendance: 23,379; Referee: Tim Robinson

19 March 2023 Quarter-final	Sheffield United	3–2	Blackburn Rovers	Sheffield
12:00 GMT	Robinson (yellow card) 21'; Gallagher 28' (o.g.); McBurnie 81'; Doyle 90+1'	Report	Brereton Díaz 21' (pen.); Szmodics 60'; Carter (yellow card) 62'	Stadium: Bramall Lane; Attendance: 25,814; Referee: Tim Robinson

=== EFL Cup ===
Win Draw Loss Fixtures

Blackburn Rovers were drawn at home to Hartlepool United in the first round, away to Bradford City in the second round and away to West Ham United in the third round. A fourth round home tie against Nottingham Forest was next in the EFL Cup.

10 August 2022 First round	Blackburn Rovers	4–0	Hartlepool United	Blackburn
19:45 BST	Wharton 32'; Dack 47', (yellow card) 61'; Dolan 51'; Markanday 73'	Report	Crawford (yellow card) 61'	Stadium: Ewood Park; Attendance: 6,844; Referee: James Bell

23 August 2022 Second round	Bradford City	1–2	Blackburn Rovers	Bradford
19:45 BST	Cook 18'; Ridehalgh (yellow card) 42'; Smallwood (yellow card) 53'	Report	Dack 31'; Markanday 39'; Rankin-Costello (yellow card) 90'	Stadium: University of Bradford Stadium; Attendance: 7,821; Referee: Ross Joyce

9 November 2022 Third round	West Ham United	2–2 (9–10 p)	Blackburn Rovers	Stratford
19:45 GMT	Fornals 38'; Antonio 78'	Report	Vale 6'; Carter (yellow card) 9'; Szmodics (yellow card) 76'; Brereton Díaz 88'	Stadium: London Stadium; Attendance: 40,534; Referee: Thomas Bramall
	Penalties
	Benrahma (penalty scored); Bowen (penalty scored); Scamacca (penalty scored); Antonio (penalty scored); Lanzini (penalty scored); Johnson (penalty scored); Cresswell (penalty scored); Downes (penalty scored); Aguerd (penalty scored); Ogbonna (penalty missed)		Brereton Díaz (penalty scored); Hyam (penalty scored); Dolan (penalty scored); Buckley (penalty scored); Szmodics (penalty scored); Edun (penalty scored); Rankin-Costello (penalty scored); Carter (penalty scored); Hirst (penalty scored); Garrett (penalty scored)

20 December 2022 Fourth round	Blackburn Rovers	1–4	Nottingham Forest	Blackburn
19:45 GMT	Wharton 44', (yellow card) 52'	Report	Johnson 13' (pen.), 90+2'; Lingard 53'; Worrall (yellow card) 55'; Awoniyi 79'; Colback (yellow card) 84'	Stadium: Ewood Park; Attendance: 15,138; Referee: Robert Jones

== Squad statistics ==
=== Appearances and goals ===
As of 8 May 2023

No.	Pos	Nat	Player	Total		Championship		FA Cup		EFL Cup	
No.	Pos	Nat	Player	Apps	Goals	Apps	Goals	Apps	Goals	Apps	Goals
1	GK	(Belgium) BEL	Thomas Kaminski	29	0	28+0	0	1+0	0	0+0	0
13	GK	(England) ENG	Aynsley Pears	26	0	18+0	0	4+0	0	4+0	0
34	GK	(England) ENG	Joe Hilton	0	0	0+0	0	0+0	0	0+0	0
35	GK	(England) ENG	Jordan Eastham	0	0	0+0	0	0+0	0	0+0	0
2	DF	(England) ENG	Callum Brittain	29	0	15+12	0	0+2	0	0+0	0
3	DF	(England) ENG	Harry Pickering	46	1	39+1	1	5+0	0	0+1	0
4	DF	(Spain) ESP	Daniel Ayala	26	1	23+2	1	1+0	0	0+0	0
5	DF	(Scotland) SCO	Dominic Hyam (VC)	42	1	36+1	1	3+0	0	0+2	0
15	DF	(England) ENG	Clinton Mola (on loan from Stuttgart)	6	0	1+3	0	0+0	0	2+0	0
16	DF	(England) ENG	Scott Wharton	28	3	17+5	1	3+1	0	2+0	2
17	DF	(England) ENG	Hayden Carter	36	1	24+6	1	4+1	0	1+0	0
32	DF	(England) ENG	Sam Barnes	0	0	0+0	0	0+0	0	0+0	0
33	DF	(England) ENG	Ashley Phillips	14	0	5+3	0	0+3	0	2+1	0
40	DF	(England) ENG	Jake Batty	1	0	0+0	0	0+0	0	0+1	0
6	MF	(England) ENG	Tyler Morton (on loan from Liverpool)	46	0	30+10	0	3+1	0	2+0	0
7	MF	(England) ENG	Tayo Edun	13	0	1+7	0	0+1	0	3+1	0
8	MF	(Republic of Ireland) IRL	Sammie Szmodics	41	7	27+7	5	2+2	2	1+2	0
10	MF	(England) ENG	Tyrhys Dolan	48	6	21+19	4	2+2	1	3+1	1
11	MF	(England) ENG	Joe Rankin-Costello	32	3	24+0	2	4+1	1	3+0	0
14	MF	(Wales) WAL	Sorba Thomas (on loan from Huddersfield Town)	17	0	11+6	0	0+0	0	0+0	0
19	MF	(Wales) WAL	Ryan Hedges	48	4	27+16	4	3+1	0	1+0	0
21	MF	(England) ENG	John Buckley	28	0	17+4	0	2+1	0	1+3	0
23	MF	(England) ENG	Bradley Dack	33	7	13+14	4	3+0	1	3+0	2
27	MF	(England) ENG	Lewis Travis (C)	48	2	39+3	2	4+1	0	1+0	0
30	MF	(England) ENG	Jake Garrett	13	0	4+4	0	1+1	0	2+1	0
36	MF	(England) ENG	Adam Wharton	22	2	12+6	2	0+0	0	4+0	0
37	MF	(England) ENG	Jared Harlock	0	0	0+0	0	0+0	0	0+0	0
9	FW	(England) ENG	Sam Gallagher	39	8	27+7	8	3+1	0	0+1	0
22	FW	(Chile) CHI	Ben Brereton Díaz	50	16	39+4	14	4+0	1	0+3	1
29	FW	(Wales) WAL	Jack Vale	22	2	6+9	0	2+2	1	3+0	1
38	FW	(England) ENG	Harry Leonard	4	0	0+4	0	0+0	0	0+0	0
Players out on loan:
	FW	(England) ENG	Daniel Butterworth (on loan at Port Vale)	0	0	0+0	0	0+0	0	0+0	0
	DF	(Republic of Ireland) IRL	James Brown (on loan at Doncaster Rovers)	0	0	0+0	0	0+0	0	0+0	0
18	FW	(England) ENG	Dilan Markanday (on loan at Aberdeen)	6	2	0+1	0	1+0	0	4+0	2
Players that played for Blackburn Rovers this season that have left the club:
14	FW	(England) ENG	George Hirst (on loan from Leicester City)	11	0	2+7	0	0+0	0	1+1	0
39	DF	(Gibraltar) GIB	Louie Annesley	1	0	0+0	0	0+0	0	1+0	0

=== Goalscorers ===
As of 8 May 2023

Rank	No.	Pos.	Name	League	FA Cup	EFL Cup	Total
1	22	FW	(Chile) Ben Brereton Díaz	14	1	1	16
2	9	FW	(England) Sam Gallagher	8	0	0	8
3	8	MF	(Republic of Ireland) Sammie Szmodics	5	2	0	7
=	23	MF	(England) Bradley Dack	4	1	2	7
5	10	MF	(England) Tyrhys Dolan	4	1	1	6
6	19	MF	(Wales) Ryan Hedges	4	0	0	4
7	11	MF	(England) Joe Rankin-Costello	2	1	0	3
=	16	DF	(England) Scott Wharton	1	0	2	3
9	18	FW	(England) Dilan Markanday	0	0	2	2
=	27	MF	(England) Lewis Travis	2	0	0	2
=	29	FW	(Wales) Jack Vale	0	1	1	2
=	36	MF	(England) Adam Wharton	2	0	0	2
11	3	DF	(England) Harry Pickering	1	0	0	1
=	4	DF	(Spain) Daniel Ayala	1	0	0	1
=	6	DF	(Scotland) Dominic Hyam	1	0	0	1
=	17	DF	(England) Hayden Carter	1	0	0	1
—	—	—	Own goal	2	1	0	3
Total				52	8	9	69
