= David Dalrymple, Lord Westhall =

Scottish lawyer

The Hon David Dalrymple, Lord Westhall (1719–1784) was an 18th-century Scottish lawyer who rose to be a Senator of the College of Justice.

== Life ==
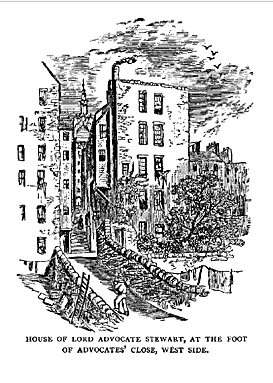
The Lord Advocates house at the foot of Advocates Close

He was born on 27 August 1719 the fourth son of Hew Dalrymple, Lord Drummore. His paternal grandfather was Hew Dalrymple, Lord North Berwick. His maternal grandfather was Robert Hamilton, Lord Presmennan of East Lothian. His siblings included General Robert Horn Dalrymple.

He passed the Scottish Bar as an advocate in 1743. In 1746 he became Procurator to the General Assembly of the Church of Scotland. In 1748 he became Sheriff of Aberdeen. In 1777 he succeeded James Ferguson, Lord Pitfour as Senator of the College of Justice.

In Edinburgh he lived in former Lord Advocate's house at the foot of the aptly named Advocates Close, off the Royal Mile, opposite St Giles Cathedral.

He moved from Advocates Close to the briefly fashionable properties on the Buccleuch Street (just south of George Square just after it was built, around 1782, and died there in 1784.

== Freemasonry ==
Dalrymple was a Scottish Freemason. He was Initiated in Lodge Canongate Kilwinning, No. 2, on 7 October 1747.

== Death ==
He died on 26 April 1784. His position as a Senator was filled by Alexander Gordon, Lord Rockville.
