= 120th Regiment of Foot (1763) =

Disbanded infantry regiment of the British Army

The 120th Regiment of Foot was an infantry regiment of the British Army, formed in 1762 by regimenting independent companies and disbanded in 1763. During its brief existence, Robert Dalrymple-Horn-Elphinstone was only the Colonel of the Regiment.
