= Robert Dalrymple-Horn-Elphinstone =

General Robert Dalrymple-Horn-Elphinstone (born Robert Dalrymple-Horn; 1 March 1718 – 20 April 1794) was a senior British Army commander of the 18th century.

== Early life and family ==
Robert Dalrymple-Horn-Elphinstone was born on 1 March 1718 in the Scottish city of Edinburgh. He was the son of the judge Hew Dalrymple of Drummore and his wife Ann Horn.

In 1754, he married Mary Elphinstone, a daughter of Sir James Elphinstone, 3rd Baronet. Thereafter, he changed his surname to Dalrymple-Horn-Elphinstone. Robert and Mary Dalrymple-Horn-Elphinstone had six children, including Sir Robert Dalrymple-Horn-Elphinstone, the first of the Dalrymple-Horn-Elphinstone baronets.

== Military career ==
From 1762 to 1763, Dalrymple-Horn-Elphinstone was only the Colonel of the short-lived 120th Regiment of Foot.

In 1780, he was appointed as the Colonel of the 53rd Regiment.

He was promoted to general in 1793.

Military offices
Preceded by John Toovey	Colonel of the 53rd Regiment of Foot; 5 February 1770 - 20 April 1794	Succeeded by Gerard Lake
