= Henry Scougal =

Scottish theologian

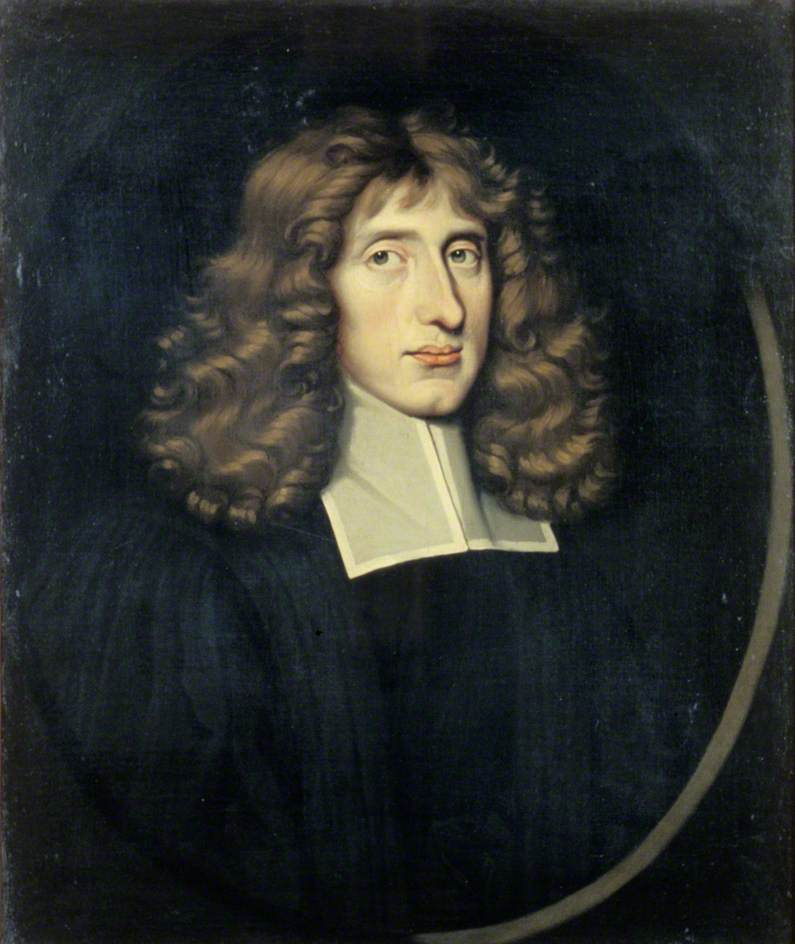
- Henry Scougal professor of Divinity
- Church: Church of Scotland

Orders
- Ordination: Auchterless 1673

Personal details
- Born: June 1650 Leuchars, Scotland
- Died: 16 June 1678 (aged 27–28) Aberdeen, Scotland
- Education: University of Aberdeen

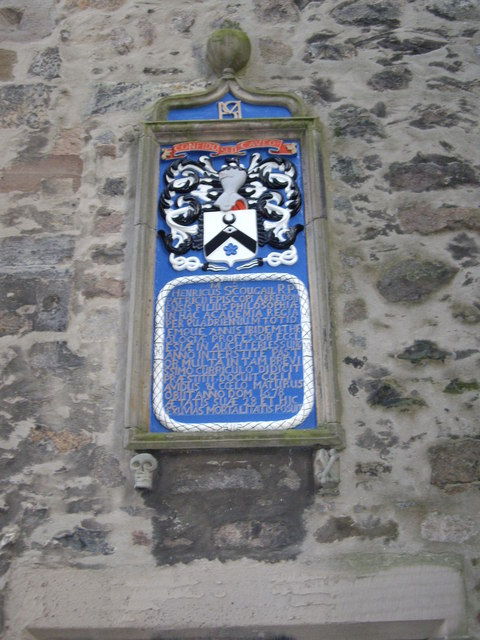
Plaque to Henry Scougal in King's College, Aberdeen.

Henry Scougal (1650–1678) was a Scottish theologian, minister and author.

Henry Scougal was the second son of Patrick Scougal and Margaret Wemys. His father held the position of Bishop of Aberdeen for more than 20 years. Henry's younger brother was James Scougal, Lord Whitehill.

From his infancy, Scougal was raised with religion. From his youth, Scougal spent his free hours in reading, meditation and prayer. He especially enjoyed studying the historical passages of the Old Testament.

In 1665 Scougal entered King's College, University of Aberdeen, and, after graduation, was promoted to the office of professor of philosophy. In 1672, Scougal was ordained and appointed minister of a church 20 miles from Aberdeen, where he served for one year before returning to take the office of professor of divinity at King's College, where he taught for five years. He spoke Latin, Hebrew, and a few Asian languages.

Scougal produced a number of works while a pastor and professor of divinity at King's. His most recognized work, The Life of God in the Soul of Man, was originally written to a friend to explain Christianity and give spiritual counsel. This work was almost universally praised by the leaders of the Great Awakening, including George Whitefield, who said he never really understood what true religion was until he had digested Scougal's treatise.

On 13 June 1678 Scougal died of tuberculosis.

== Works ==
- De Objecto Cultus Religiosi (Aberdeen, 1674)
- The Life of God in the Soul of Man (London, 1677) edited by Gilbert Burnet, 1691, 1707, 1742, 1751, 1753, other editions, Inter-Varsity Fellowship edition 1961, and a French translation in 1727; also edition (with portrait and Life) by James Cooper, D.D., Aberdeen, 1892
- Reflections and Meditations (Aberdeen, 1740)
- Essays, Moral and Divine (Aberdeen, 1740)
- Sermons (Glasgow, 1751)
- Sermons (Aberdeen, 1773)

He is said to have left in manuscript three Latin tractates — "A Short System of Ethics," "A Preservative against the Artifices of Roman Missionaries," and the first chapter of "The Pastoral Care". These were not printed, and the MSS. have disappeared.

== Bibliography ==
- Reg. of Deeds, Durie, cvii., 28th Dec. 1705;
- Butler's Henry Scougal and the Oxford Methodists (Edinburgh, 1899)
- Orem's Hist, of Aberdeen, 178
- Works (Aberdeen, 1759, 1765, 1773; London, 1818; Glasgow, 1830).
