= Robert Hamilton, Lord Presmennan =

Scottish landowner and judge

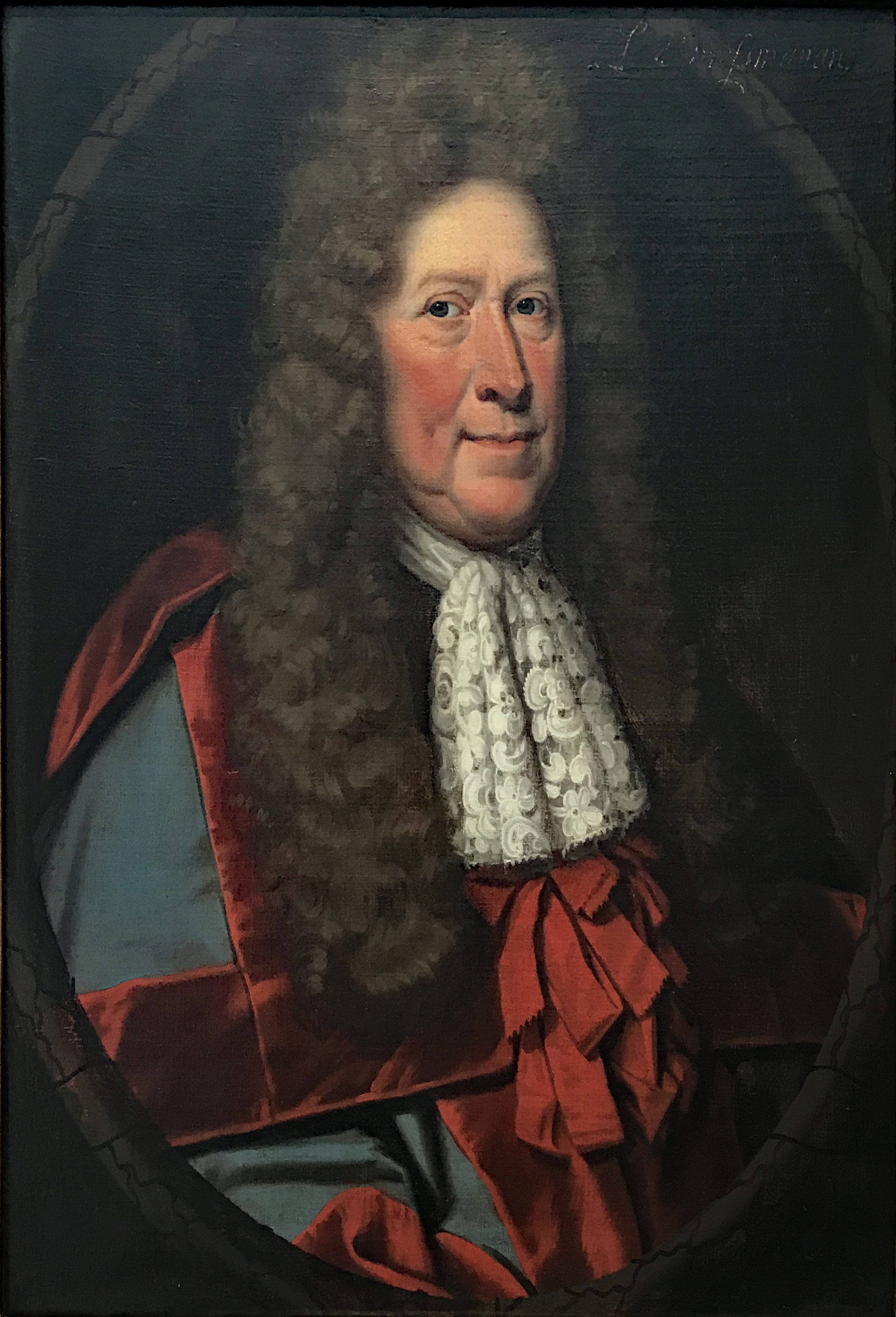
Robert Hamilton, Lord Pressmennan

Robert Hamilton, Lord Presmennan (1633–1693) was a Scottish landowner, judge and Senator of the College of Justice

== Life ==
He was born on 3 August 1633 in Barncleuch or Barncluith in Lanarkshire the son of James Hamilton of Barncluith (now a suburb of Hamilton) (1593-1632) and his wife (and cousin) Margaret Hamilton (1580-1670). Barncluith is an L-plan tower house built in 1583 by John Hamilton (still extant).

Robert trained as a lawyer and qualified as an advocate around 1655. He practised law in Edinburgh from the 1650s and gained fame as a judge. At some point in the later 17th century he bought the estate of Presmennan or Pressmennan near Dunbar, east of Edinburgh. All that remains of the Pressmennan estate is a wood, now in the care of the Woodland Trust.

In November 1689 he was elected a Senator of the College of Justice and adopted the title of Lord Presmennan.

He died in Glasgow in February 1693 aged 59. His position as Senator was filled by James Scougal, Lord Whitehill.

== Family ==
His older brother bought a baronetcy in Nova Scotia and became Sir Archibald Hamilton, 1st Baronet of Rosehall.

In 1653 he was married to Marion Denholm (1631-1686). They had 11 sons and 7 daughters including James Hamilton, Lord Pencaitland.

Their daughter Marion Hamilton married Hew Dalrymple, Lord North Berwick and their children included Hew Dalrymple, Lord Drummore.
