= Amadou Bakayoko =

Sierra Leonean footballer

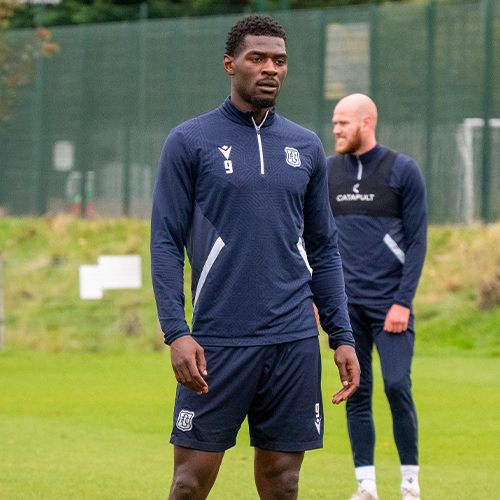
- Bakayoko training with Dundee in 2023

Personal information
- Full name: Amadou Bakayoko
- Date of birth: 1 January 1996 (age 30)
- Place of birth: Kenema, Sierra Leone
- Height: 1.93 m (6 ft 4 in)
- Position: Forward

Team information
- Current team: Hokkaido Consadole Sapporo
- Number: 20

Youth career
- –2013: Walsall

Senior career*
Years	Team	Apps	(Gls)
2013–2018	Walsall	93	(9)
2014–2015	→ Southport (loan)	11	(2)
2015	→ AFC Telford United (loan)	6	(0)
2016	→ Worcester City (loan)	9	(3)
2018–2021	Coventry City	68	(11)
2021–2023	Bolton Wanderers	52	(11)
2023–2024	Forest Green Rovers	19	(0)
2023–2024	→ Dundee (loan)	37	(6)
2024–	Hokkaido Consadole Sapporo	51	(12)

International career^{‡}
2022–	Sierra Leone	17	(4)
- * Club domestic league appearances and goals as of 29 August 2026 ‡ National team caps and goals as of 30 March 2026

Amadou Bakayoko (born 1 January 1996) is a Sierra Leonean professional footballer who plays as a forward for J2 League club Hokkaido Consadole Sapporo and the Sierra Leone national team.

== Club career ==
=== Walsall ===
Bakayoko was born in Sierra Leone but lived in Guinea until the age of six, before moving to the Netherlands where he lived until he was 10. While living at the Netherlands, Bakayoko played for FC Groningen "for about a week or two" but left the club when his family moved to England. The family’s decision to move to surprised him, as his mother initially told him and his brother "that it was a holiday". After moving to England, he began playing in Birmingham, including a Sunday football team before winning a scholarship at Walsall. After prolific goal scoring at youth and reserve team level, Bakayoko was offered a one-year professional contract at Walsall in December 2013. A month later, he was named in 'The 11' by League Football Education. Bakayoko made his debut for the "Saddlers" on 5 April 2014, replacing Michael Ngoo 68 minutes into a 1–0 defeat to Port Vale at Vale Park. He went on to make six appearances in the 2013–14 season.

Ahead of the 2014–15 season, Bakayoko switched number shirt from twenty–seven to twenty. However, he appeared three times for Walsall by October, with his playing time coming from the substitute bench. After his loan spell at Southport ended, Bakayoko returned to the club and continued to find his playing time coming from the substitute bench. At the end of the 2014–15 season, he went on to make seven appearances in all competitions. Following this, Bakayoko signed a contract extension with Walsall.

Ahead off the 2016–17 season, Bakayoko signed a one–year contract extension with Walsall, having been offered one by the club. Upon signing a new contract with Walsall, he stated his aim was to make a first team breakthrough with the club. Bakayoko scored his first goals for Walsall when he scored a hat-trick in an EFL Trophy tie against Grimsby Town on 30 August 2016. In another EFL Trophy match against Sheffield United on 4 October 2016, he set up the club’s opening goal of the game before scoring a goal for himself, in a 2–1 win. A week later on 15 October 2016, Bakayoko scored his first league goal in a 3–2 win over Shrewsbury Town, though he was later sent off in the same match. He scored two goals against Sheffield United in the two league meetings, with the first one occurred on 29 November 2016 and the second occurred on 14 January 2017. Once again, Bakayoko scored two goals against and Oldham Athletic in two meetings this season, with the first one occurred on 13 December 2016 and the second occurred on 4 March 2017. On 7 November 2016, Bakayoko signed a two–year contract with Walsall, keeping him until 2018. Having started out on the substitute bench and competed over a first choice striker role against Andreas Makris and Simeon Jackson, he soon won his place in the first team and became the club's first choice striker. However due to goal drought, Bakayoko was demoted back to the substitute bench. However, he suffered a "minor groin injury" that saw him out for two matches. Bakayoko made his return from injury, starting the whole game, in a 1–1 draw against Shrewsbury Town on 14 April 2017. At the end of the 2016–17 season, he made forty–five appearances and scoring ten times in all competitions. For his performance, Bakayoko was named Walsall's Young Player of the season.

At the start of the 2017–18 season, Bakayoko scored two goals for Walsall, coming against Sheffield United and Bradford City. He continued to regain his first team place for the side, becoming the club’s first choice striker. On 12 September 2017, Bakayoko scored his third goal of the season, in a 5–1 loss against Rotherham United. In a match against Coventry City on 3 October 2017, he set up the last minute equalising goal for Dan Agyei, which a 2–2 draw send the match penalty shoot–out and then successfully converted a shootout, as Walsall lose 4–3. However, Bakayoko received criticism from the club’s supporters for his goal drought. In response, Bakayoko scored three goals throughout November, coming against Newport County, Shrewsbury Town and AFC Wimbledon. However in a match against Northampton Town on 16 December 2017, he received a straight red card for a poor challenge, in a 2–1 loss. After serving a three match suspension, Bakayoko returned to the starting line–up, in a 1–0 loss against Plymouth Argyle on 1 January 2018. In a follow–up match against Oxford United, he scored his seventh goal of the season, in a 2–1 win. In a match against Doncaster Rovers on 13 February 2018, Bakayoko scored his eighth goal of the season in the 71st minute, having come on as a substitute eleven minutes earlier, in a 4–2 win. At the end of the 2017–18 season, he went on to make forty–seven appearances and scoring eight times in all competitions. His contract was extended by Walsall at the end of the 2017–18 season after the club exercised an option.

==== Loan spells from Walsall ====
On 9 October 2014, Bakayoko joined Conference Premier side Southport on a month's loan. He made a scoring debut as a substitute in the club's 2–0 victory over Braintree Town. Bakayoko subsequently had his loan with Southport extended twice, which kept him until January. He scored his second goal for the club in a 3–2 victory over Nuneaton Town on 22 November 2014. After his loan spell with Southport ended on 15 January 2015, he made sixteen appearances and scoring three times for the club.

On 15 August 2015, Bakayoko was loaned out to AFC Telford United for a month. On the same day, he made his debut for the club, starting the whole game, in a 1–0 loss against Stockport County. Having made six appearances for AFC Telford United, Bakayoko returned to his parent club.

Bakayoko joined Worcester City on a one–month loan deal on 15 January 2016. He made his debut for the club, starting the match and played 63 minutes before being substituted, in a 2–1 loss against Corby Town on 16 January 2016. In a follow–up match against AFC Fylde, Bakayoko scored his first goal for Worcester City, in a 3–2 win. He then scored two goals in two matches between 20 February 2016 and 23 February 2016. His performances led the club to extend his loan spell beyond end of the 2015–16 season on two occasions. In a match against Boston United on 27 February 2016, Bakayoko received a red card in the 88th minute "for kicking out at Liam Marrs", as Worcester United drew 1–1. However, after serving a three match suspension, he suffered a knee injury that saw him out for the rest of the 2015–16 season. By the time Bakayoko suffered an injury, he made nine appearances and scored three league goals in the National League North for Worcester City.

=== Coventry City ===
On 7 August 2018, Bakayoko joined League One side Coventry City for an undisclosed fee, signing a two-year deal. uPON

He made his debut for the club, starting a match and played 64 minutes before being substituted, in a 0–0 draw against AFC Wimbledon on 11 August 2018. In a follow–up match against Plymouth Argyle, Bakayoko scored his first goal for Coventry City, scoring from a penalty, in a 1–0 win. However, he found his playing time from the substitute bench, due to the competition from Conor Chaplin and Jordy Hiwula. In a match against Charlton Athletic on 6 October 2018, Bakayoko came on as a 57th minute substitute bench and scored twice, in a 2–1 win. Four days later on 10 October 2018 in a EFL Trophy match against Forest Green Rovers, he started the whole game, resulting a 1–1 draw and was one of the four players to have their penalty successfully converted, as the club won 4–2 in a penalty shootout. However, Bakayoko soon suffered a suffered a knee injury while training and was out for two months. But on 26 January 2019, he returned from injury, coming on as a 65th minute substitute, in a 2–0 loss against Blackpool. Since returning from injury, Bakayoko regained his first team place for Coventry City, becoming the club's first choice striker. He then scored his first goal against his former club, Walsall, scoring from a header, in a 3–0 win on 16 February 2019. Bakayoko scored two goals in two matches between 12 March 2019 and 16 March 2019 against Fleetwood Town and Peterborough United. In a match against Sunderland on 13 April 2019, he scored and then set up one of the goals, as Coventry City won 5–4. At the end of the 2018–19 season, Bakayoko made thirty–five appearances and scoring seven times in all competitions.

At the start of the 2019–20 season, Bakayoko found his playing time, coming from the substitute bench, due to competitions from new signing, Matt Godden and Maxime Biamou. He scored his first goal of the season, in a 4–1 win against Exeter City in the first round of the League Cup. Due to Gooden's injury, Bakayoko received more playing time for two months, becoming Coventry City's first choice striker. In a match against Doncaster Rovers on 28 September 2019, he came on as a 83rd minute substitute and scored six minutes later, in a 1–1 draw. His goal against Doncaster Rovers earned him the club's September Goal of the Month award. Coincidentally, Bakayoko scored two goals in two matches between 23 October 2019 and 26 October 2019 against Fleetwood Town and Peterborough United, having done so earlier this year. Due to returning the form of Godden and Biamou, he returned back to the substitute bench for the rest of the 2019–20 season. Bakayoko scored his fifth goal of the season, scoring the opening goal of the game, in a 2–1 win against Bolton Wanderers on 8 February 2020. His contributions helped Coventry City to a first-place finish and promoted to the Championship in a season interrupted by the COVID-19 pandemic in the United Kingdom. At the end of the 2019–20 season, he made thirty–three appearances and scoring five times in all competitions. Following this, the club opted to take up their option of a contract extension that would ensure Bakayoko remained under contract for the 2020–21 season.

Ahead of the 2020–21 season, Bakayoko switched number shirt from twenty–one to twenty. However in Coventry City's return to the Championship at the start of the 2020–21 season, he continued to remain on the substitute bench, due to a competitions from Godden, Biamou, Tyler Walker and Viktor Gyökeres. With his first team opportunities, Bakayoko was expecting to leave Coventry City in the January transfer window, but the move never materialised. As the 2020–21 season progressed, he also plagued with further injuries. At the end of the 2020–21 season, Bakayoko made seventeen appearances in all competitions. On 12 May 2021, it was announced that he would leave Coventry at the end of the season, following the expiry of his contract.

=== Bolton Wanderers ===
On 25 June 2021, Bakayoko joined League One side Bolton Wanderers on a two-year deal. Upon joining the club, he was given a number eleven shirt.

His competitive debut came on 7 August in a 3–3 draw against Milton Keynes Dons, with him scoring on his debut to put Bolton Wanderers 2–1 up and the match ended in a 3–3 draw. In a follow–up EFL Cup match against Barnsley, Bakayoko came on as 55th minute substitute and helped the club go into penalties after a 0–0 draw and successfully convert the penalty to help Bolton Wanderers win 5–4 in the shootout to advance to the next round. In a match against Lincoln City on 17 August 2021, however, he suffered a calf injury in the 39th minute and was substitute, as the club won 1–0. After the match, Bakayoko was out for six weeks with a calf injury. He made his return from injury, coming on as a 71st minute substitute, in a 2–1 win against Shrewsbury Town on 2 October 2021. Three days later on 5 October 2021, Bakayoko scored twice for Bolton Wanderers' EFL Trophy match against Liverpool U21, as the club won 4–1. He then scored two goals in two matches between 12 November 2021 and 17 November 2021, coming against Crewe Alexandra and Stockport County. However, Bakayoko suffered a hamstring injury that saw him out for six weeks. It wasn't until on 1 January 2022 when he made his return from injury, coming on as a 70th minute substitute, in a 2–1 loss against Rotherham United. Since returning from injury, Bakayoko was involved in every matches in the first team, with his playing time coming from the substitute bench. At the beginning of February, he went on to a goal scoring form for the club, scoring five times. After scoring a goal against Morecambe, Bakayoko suffered racial abuse from the home team's supporters, which manager Ian Evatt and Bolton Wanderers' supporters both condemned their actions. Despite this, his performance earned two PFA nominations but only won the PFA Vertu Motors Fans' Player of the Month. On 19 March 2022, he came on as a 72nd minute substitute and scored the winning goal at the last minute, in a 1–0 win against Crewe Alexandra. Bakayoko then scored two more goals later in the 2021–22 season, coming against Doncaster Rovers and Cheltenham Town. At the end of the 2021–22 season, he went on to make thirty–seven appearances and scoring thirteen goals in all competitions. For his performance, Bakayoko was awarded the club’s Community Award.

However at the start of the 2022–23 season, Bakayoko found himself behind the pecking order in the first team following the new signing of Dion Charles and found his playing time, coming from the substitute bench. He also found himself out of the first team, due to his international commitment and his own injury concern. His first goal of the season came on 30 August 2022, in a 4–1 win against Crewe Alexandra in the EFL Trophy. Bakayoko scored two more goals in October, coming against Leeds United U21 and Burton Albion. He then scored his fourth goal of the season, in a 4–0 win against Manchester United U21 on 13 December 2022. In the January transfer window, Bakayoko was linked a move away from Bolton Wanderers, with Salford City interested in signing him.

=== Forest Green Rovers ===
On 12 January 2023, Bakayoko joined fellow League One club Forest Green Rovers on a permanent deal for an undisclosed fee.

He made his debut for the club, coming on as a 64th minute substitute, in a 2–1 loss against Exeter City on 14 January 2023. However, since joining Forest Green Rovers, Bakayoko suffered a goal drought and soon found his playing time from the substitute bench. He also faced his own injury concern along the way. On 15 April 2023, Forest Green Rovers was relegated to League Two after losing 5–1 against Barnsley. At the end of the 2022–23 season, Bakayoko made nineteen appearances in all competitions. On 10 July 2024, Forest Green confirmed that Bakayoko had mutually left the club.

==== Dundee (loan) ====
On 27 July 2023, Bakayoko joined Scottish Premiership club Dundee on a season-long loan from Rovers. Upon joining the club, he was given a number nine shirt.

Bakayoko made his debut for the Dark Blues as a substitute in a Scottish League Cup group stage win over Inverness Caledonian Thistle. While a potential first goal against St Johnstone was given to teammate Scott Tiffoney instead, his first undisputed goal came in a league game at home to Kilmarnock. Since joining Dundee, he became a first team regular, becoming the club's first choice striker. Bakayoko scored twice for the Dark Blues, in a 4–0 win against St Mirren on 11 November 2023. He then scored three more goals for Dundee, including one against St Johnstone that saw the club finish in the top-six in the league. After it was reported that the Dark Blues were keen on signing Bakayoko on a permanent basis, it was revealed by parent club Forest Green Rovers that he was still under contract for next season and would be retained following their relegation to the National League.

=== Hokkaido Consadole Sapporo ===
On 28 July 2024, J1 League club Hokkaido Consadole Sapporo announced they had signed Bakayoko. He made his debut on 16 August as a substitute, and scored his first goal from the penalty spot in a 5–3 win over Sagan Tosu.

== International career ==
On 17 March 2022, Bakayoko accepted a call up for the Sierra Leone national team. He was also eligible for the Guinea national team. Three years prior, Bakayoko initially turned down a call–up from Sierra Leone.

Bakayoko made his debut for Sierra Leone on 23 March 2022, as the side lost 3–0 to Togo in an international friendly. He scored his first goal for them five days later, scoring the only goal in a 1–0 win against Liberia. A year later on 11 September 2023, Bakayoko scored his second goal for Sierra Leone, in a 2–1 loss against Guinea-Bissau.

On 10 June 2024 Bakayoko was substituted on at 86' and scored a minute later the equaliser for Sierra Leone in their World Cup Qualifier against Burkina Faso.

== Personal life ==
In June 2017, Bakayoko became a first time father. In February 2024, Bakayoko welcomed his second child.

== Career statistics ==
As of match played 2 September 2026

Appearances and goals by club, season and competition
Club	Season	League			National Cup		League Cup		Other		Total	
Club	Season	Division	Apps	Goals	Apps	Goals	Apps	Goals	Apps	Goals	Apps	Goals
Walsall	2013–14	League One	6	0	0	0	0	0	0	0	6	0
Walsall	2014–15	League One	7	0	0	0	0	0	0	0	7	0
Walsall	2015–16	League One	0	0	1	0	0	0	0	0	1	0
Walsall	2016–17	League One	39	4	1	0	1	0	4 (Note: Appearance(s) in EFL Trophy)	6	45	10
Walsall	2017–18	League One	41	5	1	1	1	1	4	1	47	8
Walsall	Total		93	9	3	1	2	1	8	7	106	18
Southport (loan)	2014–15	Conference Premier	11	2	1	0	—		4 (Note: Two appearances in FA Trophy; one appearance one goal in Liverpool Senior Cup, one appearance in Lancashire Senior Cup)	1	16	3
AFC Telford United (loan)	2015–16	National League North	6	0	0	0	—		0	0	6	0
Worcester City (loan)	2015–16	National League North	9	3	0	0	—		0	0	9	3
Coventry City	2018–19	League One	31	7	0	0	1	0	3	0	35	7
Coventry City	2019–20	League One	23	4	5	1	2	1	3	0	33	6
Coventry City	2020–21	Championship	14	0	1	0	2	0	—		17	0
Coventry City	Total		68	11	6	1	5	1	6	0	85	13
Bolton Wanderers	2021–22	League One	32	10	2	1	1	0	2	2	37	13
Bolton Wanderers	2022–23	League One	20	1	1	0	1	0	5	2	27	3
Bolton Wanderers	Total		52	11	3	1	2	0	7	4	64	16
Forest Green Rovers	2022–23	League One	19	0	—		—		—		19	0
Dundee (loan)	2023–24	Scottish Premiership	37	6	1	0	1	0	0	0	39	6
Hokkaido Consadole Sapporo	2024	J1 League	6	1	1	0	2	0	—		9	1
Hokkaido Consadole Sapporo	2025	J2 League	32	7	1	0	0	0	0	0	33	7
Hokkaido Consadole Sapporo	2026	J2/J3 100 Year Vision League	11	4	—		—		—		11	4
Hokkaido Consadole Sapporo	2026–27	J2 League	2	0	1	0	1	0	0	0	4	0
Hokkaido Consadole Sapporo	Total		51	12	3	0	3	0	0	0	57	12
Career total			344	54	17	3	13	2	25	12	398	71

=== International goals ===
As of match played 19 November 2024

Appearances and goals by national team and year
National team	Year	Apps	Goals
Sierra Leone	2022	7	1
Sierra Leone	2023	3	1
Sierra Leone	2024	6	2
Sierra Leone	2026	1	0
Total		17	4

Scores and results list Sierra Leone's goal tally first.

No.	Date	Venue	Opponent	Score	Result	Competition
1.	27 March 2022	Mardan Sports Complex, Aksu, Turkey	Liberia	1–0	1–0	Friendly
2.	11 September 2023	Estádio 24 de Setembro, Bissau, Guinea-Bissau	Guinea-Bissau	1–0	1–2	2023 Africa Cup of Nations qualification
3.	10 June 2024	Stade du 26 Mars, Bamako, Mali	Burkina Faso	2–2	2–2	2026 FIFA World Cup qualification
4.	15 October 2024	Samuel Kanyon Doe Sports Complex, Monrovia, Liberia	Ivory Coast	1–0	1–0	2025 Africa Cup of Nations qualification

== Honours ==
Coventry City

- EFL League One: 2019–20
