= 2019–20 Coventry City F.C. season =

Coventry City
2019–20 season
- Chairman: Tim Fisher
- Manager: Mark Robins
- Stadium: St Andrew's
- League One: 1st (promoted)
- FA Cup: Fourth round vs Birmingham City
- EFL Cup: Second round vs Watford
- EFL Trophy: Second round vs Milton Keynes Dons
- Top goalscorer: League: Matt Godden 14; All: Matt Godden 15
- Highest home attendance: 10,055 vs Sunderland (league, 1 March 2020); 21,193 vs Birmingham City (cup, 25 January 2020)
- Lowest home attendance: 4,672 vs Fleetwood Town (league, 23 October 2019); 375 vs Southampton U21 (cup, 5 November 2019)
- Average home league attendance: 6,677
- Biggest win: 4–1 vs Exeter City (EFL Cup, 13 August 2019); 4–1 vs Wycombe Wanderers (League One, 29 December 2019); 4–1 vs Tranmere Rovers (League One, 1 January 2020)
- Biggest defeat: 4–0 vs Rotherham United (League One, 5 October 2019)
Home colours	Away colours	Third colours
- All statistics correct as of 7 March 2020.

The 2019–20 season was Coventry City's 136th season in their existence, the club's second consecutive season in League One and their first at St Andrew's. Along with competing in League One, the club also competed in the FA Cup, EFL Cup and EFL Trophy.

The season covers the period from 1 July 2019 to 30 June 2020.

== Preseason ==
The Sky Blues confirmed they will play Leamington, Northampton Town, AFC Telford United, Liverpool Under-23s and Swindon Town during their pre-season preparations.

6 July 2019 Friendly	Leamington	0–4	Coventry City	Leamington Spa
15:00 BST		Report	Kastaneer 17'; Shipley 32'; Pask 42'; Biamou 90'	Stadium: New Windmill Ground

12 July 2019 Friendly	Coventry City	1–1	Northampton Town	San Pedro del Pinatar, Spain
17:00 CET	Allen 47'	Report	Smith 42'	Stadium: Pinatar Arena Football Center

20 July 2019 Friendly	AFC Telford United	1–1	Coventry City	Telford
15:00 BST	Royle 78'	Report	Trialist 25'	Stadium: New Bucks Head; Attendance: 667

24 July 2019 Friendly	Coventry City	0–0	Liverpool Under-23s	Rugby
19:00 BST		Report		Stadium: Butlin Road; Attendance: 2,594

27 July 2019 Friendly	Swindon Town	0–2	Coventry City	Swindon
15:00 BST		Report	Bakayoko 58'; Biamou 90'	Stadium: County Ground; Referee: Andy Woolmer

== Competitions ==
=== League One ===
==== League table ====
Pos	Team	Pld	W	D	L	GF	GA	GD	Pts	PPG	Promotion, qualification or relegation
1	Coventry City (C, P)	34	18	13	3	48	30	+18	67	1.97	Promotion to the EFL Championship
2	Rotherham United (P)	35	18	8	9	61	38	+23	62	1.77	Promotion to the EFL Championship
3	Wycombe Wanderers (O, P)	34	17	8	9	45	40	+5	59	1.74	Qualification for League One play-offs (Note: Four teams play for one spot and promotion to the EFL Championship.)
4	Oxford United	35	17	9	9	61	37	+24	60	1.71	Qualification for League One play-offs
5	Portsmouth	35	17	9	9	53	36	+17	60	1.71	Qualification for League One play-offs
6	Fleetwood Town	35	16	12	7	51	38	+13	60	1.71	Qualification for League One play-offs
7	Peterborough United	35	17	8	10	68	40	+28	59	1.69	
8	Sunderland	36	16	11	9	48	32	+16	59	1.64	

Source: EFL Official Website
Rules for classification: 1) Points per game; 2) Goal difference; 3) Number of goals scored; 4) Head-to-head results; 5) Wins; 6) Away goals; 7) Penalty points (sec 9.5); 8) 12-point sending-off offences
(C) Champions; (O) Play-off winners; (P) Promoted

==== Results summary ====
Overall								Home						Away					
Pld	W	D	L	GF	GA	GD	Pts	W	D	L	GF	GA	GD	W	D	L	GF	GA	GD
34	18	13	3	48	30	+18	67	11	5	1	22	11	+11	7	8	2	26	19	+7

Last updated: 7 March 2020.
Source: BBC

==== Results by matchday ====
Matchday	1	2	3	4	5	6	7	8	9	10	11	12	13	14	15	16	17	18	19	20	21	22	23	24	25	26	27	28	29	30	31	32	33	34
Ground	H	A	H	A	H	A	H	A	H	H	A	H	A	H	A	H	H	A	H	A	H	A	A	H	A	A	A	H	H	A	A	H	H	A
Result	W	D	W	D	W	D	W	D	W	D	L	L	D	W	D	D	W	D	D	L	W	W	W	D	W	D	W	W	W	W	W	D	W	W
Position	7	8	4	3	5	4	2	1	1	4	5	7	6	4	6	6	3	5	6	7	5	5	3	4	4	5	5	4	3	2	2	2	1	1

Updated to match(es) played on 9 June 2020. Source: Statto.com
A = Away; H = Home; W = Win; D = Draw; L = Loss

==== Matches ====
On 20 June 2019, the League One fixtures for the forthcoming season were announced.

3 August 2019 1	Coventry City	1–0	Southend United	Birmingham
15:00 BST	Westbrooke 51'; Kelly (yellow card) 88'	Report	Lennon (yellow card) 90'	Stadium: St Andrew's Trillion Trophy Stadium; Attendance: 6,534; Referee: Craig Hicks

10 August 2019 2	Bolton Wanderers	0–0	Coventry City	Horwich
15:00 BST	Brown (yellow card) 19'; Weir (yellow card) 58'; Darcy (yellow card) 82'; Politic (yellow card) 86'	Report	Dabo (yellow card) 30'	Stadium: University of Bolton Stadium; Attendance: 8,901; Referee: James Adcock

17 August 2019 3	Coventry City	2–0	Bristol Rovers	Birmingham
15:00 BST	Shipley 45+1'; Kastaneer 82'; Godden (yellow card) 74'	Report	Bennett (yellow card) 31'; Davies (yellow card) 65'; Clarke (yellow card) 84'	Stadium: St Andrew's Trillion Trophy Stadium; Attendance: 6,976; Referee: Ross Joyce

20 August 2019 4	Portsmouth	3–3	Coventry City	Milton
19:45 BST	Curtis 10'; Marquis 43', (yellow card) 88'; Evans 56'; Naylor (yellow card) 85'	Report	Hiwula 3'; Godden 75' (pen.); Rose 86'; Dabo (yellow card) 35' (yellow-red card) 59'; McFadzean (yellow card) 38'; Kastaneer (yellow card) 71' (yellow-red card) 78'	Stadium: Fratton Park; Attendance: 18,748; Referee: Kevin Johnson

24 August 2019 5	Coventry City	1–0	Gillingham	Birmingham
15:00 BST	Hyam 26'	Report	Fuller (yellow card) 28'; Byrne (yellow card) 35'	Stadium: St Andrew's Trillion Trophy Stadium; Attendance: 5,624; Referee: Martin Coy

31 August 2019 6	Oxford United	3–3	Coventry City	Oxford
15:00 BST	Mackie 64', (yellow card) 90+6'; Dabo 30' (o.g.); Moore 90+4'; Dickie (yellow card) 41'; Forde (yellow card) 62'; Ruffels (yellow card) 67'	Report	Westbrooke 35', (yellow card) 74'; Godden 56'; O'Hare 90+1'; Shipley (yellow card) 29'	Stadium: Kassam Stadium; Attendance: 8,080; Referee: Graham Salisbury

7 September 2019 7	Coventry City	3–2	Blackpool	Birmingham
15:00 BST	Godden 41'; Jobello 45+1'; O'Hare 90+1'; Dabo (yellow card) 57'	Report	Kaikai 2', 38'; Delfouneso (yellow card) 80'	Stadium: St Andrew's Trillion Trophy Stadium; Attendance: 6,637; Referee: Paul Marsden

14 September 2019 8	Burton Albion	0–0	Coventry City	Burton-upon-Trent
15:00 BST	O'Toole (yellow card) 62'; Nartey (yellow card) 89'	Report	Walsh (yellow card) 57'; McFadzean (yellow card) 81'	Stadium: Pirelli Stadium; Attendance: 4,409; Referee: Oliver Langford

17 September 2019 9	Coventry City	2–1	AFC Wimbledon	Birmingham
19:45 BST	Hiwula 27'; Walsh 90+3'; Dabo (yellow card) 82'	Report	Forss 8' (pen.), (yellow card) 31'; Guinness-Walker (yellow card) 51'	Stadium: St Andrew's Trillion Trophy Stadium; Attendance: 5,239; Referee: Trevor Kettle

28 September 2019 10	Coventry City	1–1	Doncaster Rovers	Birmingham
15:00 BST	Bakayoko 89', (yellow card) 90+6'; McFadzean (yellow card) 43'; Shipley (yellow card) 90+3'	Report	Whiteman 41'; James (yellow card) 90+3'	Stadium: St Andrew's Trillion Trophy Stadium; Attendance: 7,010; Referee: James Adcock

5 October 2019 11	Rotherham United	4–0	Coventry City	Rotherham
15:00 BST	Crooks 13', 75'; Smith 19' (pen.), 58' (pen.); Mattock (yellow card) 42'; Olosunde (yellow card) 45+2'	Report	McFadzean (red card) 57'; O'Hare (yellow card) 90+3'	Stadium: AESSEAL New York Stadium; Attendance: 10,337; Referee: Darren Handley

13 October 2019 12	Coventry City	0–1	Tranmere Rovers	Birmingham
12:00 BST	Dabo (yellow card) 39'	Report	Blackett-Taylor 83'; Payne (yellow card) 38'; Hepburn-Murphy (yellow card) 59'; Davies (yellow card) 70'	Stadium: St Andrew's Trillion Trophy Stadium; Attendance: 5,658; Referee: Darren Drysdale

19 October 2019 13	Milton Keynes Dons	0–0	Coventry City	Denbigh
15:00 BST	Williams (yellow card) 1'; Brittain (yellow card) 61'; Lewington (yellow card) 64'; Kasumu (yellow card) 66'; Moore-Taylor (yellow card) 69'; Gilbey (yellow card) 79'	Report	Hiwula (penalty missed)	Stadium: Stadium MK; Attendance: 13,621; Referee: John Busby

23 October 2019 14	Coventry City	2–1	Fleetwood Town	Birmingham
19:45 BST	Bakayoko 59'; Westbrooke 68' (pen.)	Report	Madden 9'; Andrew (yellow card) 23'; Hunter (yellow card) 82'	Stadium: St Andrew's Trillion Trophy Stadium; Attendance: 4,672; Referee: Michael Salisbury

26 October 2019 15	Peterborough United	2–2	Coventry City	Peterborough
15:00 BST	Maddison 52' (pen.); Eisa 90+5'; Mason (yellow card) 21'; Blake-Tracy (yellow card) 23'; Knight (yellow card) 57'	Report	Bakayoko 12'; Biamou 85'; McCallum (yellow card) 14'; Dabo (yellow card) 43'; McFadzean (yellow card) 51'; Rose (yellow card) 82'	Stadium: Weston Homes Stadium; Attendance: 8,005; Referee: Alan Young

2 November 2019 16	Coventry City	0–0	Accrington Stanley	Birmingham
15:00 GMT	Biamou (red card) 68'; O'Hare (yellow card) 53'; McFadzean (yellow card) 80'	Report		Stadium: St Andrew's Trillion Trophy Stadium; Attendance: 5,455; Referee: Ollie Yates

16 November 2019 17	Coventry City	2–1	Rochdale	Birmingham
15:00 GMT	Shipley 42'; Walsh 72'; Drysdale (yellow card) 61'	Report	Henderson 28'; Ryan (yellow card) 39'	Stadium: St Andrew's Trillion Trophy Stadium; Attendance: 5,433; Referee: Marc Edwards

23 November 2019 18	Sunderland	1–1	Coventry City	Sunderland
15:00 GMT	Mbunga-Kimpioka 90'; McGeady (yellow card) 90+4'	Report	Hyam 26'; Dabo (yellow card) 78'	Stadium: Stadium of Light; Attendance: 29,809; Referee: Scott Oldham

7 December 2019 19	Coventry City	1–1	Ipswich Town	Birmingham
15:00 GMT	Biamou 56'; Kastaneer (yellow card) 59'	Report	Keane 31'; Edwards (yellow card) 59'; Woolfenden (yellow card) 76'; Jackson (yellow card) 90+2'	Stadium: St Andrew's Trillion Trophy Stadium; Attendance: 8,085; Referee: Darren Drysdale

14 December 2019 20	Shrewsbury Town	2–1	Coventry City	Shrewsbury
15:00 GMT	Norburn (yellow card) 23'; Love (yellow card) 62'; Golbourne 68'; Whalley 90+1'	Report	Shipley 26'; Walsh (yellow card) 71'; Kelly (yellow card) 86'	Stadium: Montgomery Waters Meadow; Attendance: 7,336; Referee: Tom Nield

21 December 2019 21	Coventry City	1–0	Lincoln City	Birmingham
15:00 GMT	Westbrooke 32'	Report		Stadium: St Andrew's Trillion Trophy Stadium; Attendance: 6,863; Referee: Darren Handley

29 December 2019 22	Wycombe Wanderers	1–4	Coventry City	High Wycombe
15:00 GMT	Akinfenwa 14'; Jombati (yellow card) 16'; Jacobson (yellow card) 23'; Wheeler (yellow card) 73'	Report	McCallum 3'; Godden 16' (pen.), 44', 50'; Hyam (yellow card) 66'; Maroši (yellow card) 81'	Stadium: Adams Park; Attendance: 7,533; Referee: Kevin Johnson

1 January 2020 23	Tranmere Rovers	1–4	Coventry City	Birkenhead
15:00 GMT	Morris (yellow card) 24'; Jennings 35'	Report	Godden 3', 67', 90+2' (pen.); Shipley 17'	Stadium: Prenton Park; Attendance: 7,828; Referee: Will Finnie

4 January 2020	Coventry City	v	Rotherham United	Birmingham
15:00 GMT		Report		Stadium: St Andrew's Trillion Trophy Stadium
Note: The match was postponed on 12 December due to both teams progression in the FA Cup.

11 January 2020 24	Coventry City	1–1	Milton Keynes Dons	Birmingham
15:00 GMT	McCallum 1' (yellow card) 40'	Report	Morris 75'	Stadium: St Andrew's Trillion Trophy Stadium; Attendance: 6,666; Referee: Carl Boyeson

18 January 2020 25	Doncaster Rovers	0–1	Coventry City	Doncaster
15:00 GMT	Sheaf (yellow card) 55'	Report	Shipley 26'; McCallum (yellow card) 65'; Maroši (yellow card) 88'	Stadium: Keepmoat Stadium; Attendance: 9,537; Referee: Marc Edwards

25 January 2020	Coventry City	v	Wycombe Wanderers	Birmingham
15:00 GMT				Stadium: St Andrew's Trillion Trophy Stadium

28 January 2020 26	Fleetwood Town	0–0	Coventry City	Fleetwood
19:45 GMT	Coyle (yellow card) 18'; Whelan (yellow card) 66'; Souttar (yellow card) 88'; Evans (yellow card) 90'; Sowerby (yellow card) 90+1'	Report	McCallum (yellow card) 78'; McFadzean (yellow card) 87'; Walsh (yellow card) 90+2'	Stadium: Highbury Stadium; Attendance: 2,506; Referee: Ollie Yates

1 February 2020 27	Bristol Rovers	1–2	Coventry City	Horfield
15:00 GMT	Upson (yellow card) 3'; Davies (yellow card) 6'; Clarke-Harris 23'; Kilgour (yellow card) 65'; Ogogo (yellow card) 76'	Report	Walsh (yellow card) 22', (goal) 45+1'; Allen 38'	Stadium: Memorial Stadium; Attendance: 7,859; Referee: Craig Hicks

8 February 2020 28	Coventry City	2–1	Bolton Wanderers	Birmingham
15:00 GMT	Bakayoko 3' (yellow card) 69'; Biamou 90'	Report	Politic 77'	Stadium: St Andrew's Trillion Trophy Stadium; Attendance: 6,623; Referee: Ross Joyce

11 February 2020 29	Coventry City	1–0	Portsmouth	Birmingham
19:45 GMT	Godden 84'	Report	McGeehan (yellow card) 20'; Close (yellow card) 57'	Stadium: St Andrew's Trillion Trophy Stadium; Attendance: 6,983; Referee: Scott Oldham

15 February 2020 30	Southend United	0–2	Coventry City	Southend-on-Sea
15:00 GMT		Report	Dabo (yellow card) 31'; O'Hare 60'; Biamou 79'	Stadium: Roots Hall; Attendance: 7,278; Referee: Sam Purkiss

22 February 2020 31	Rochdale	1–2	Coventry City	Spotland
15:00 GMT	Matheson (yellow card) 41'; McShane (yellow card) 50'; Wilbraham 72'; Henderson (yellow card) 78'	Report	Rose 4'; McCallum (yellow card) 21'; Godden 71'	Stadium: Crown Oil Arena; Attendance: 4,356; Referee: Chris Sarginson

25 February 2020 32	Coventry City	1–1	Rotherham United	Birmingham
19:45 GMT	Godden 47'; O'Hare (yellow card) 82'	Report	Ladapo 23'; Wood (yellow card) 25'; Olosunde (yellow card) 33'; Crooks (yellow card) 87'	Stadium: St Andrew's Trillion Trophy Stadium; Attendance: 8,990; Referee: Christopher Pollard

1 March 2020 33	Coventry City	1–0	Sunderland	Birmingham
12:00 GMT	Godden 2'; Maroši (yellow card) 31'	Report		Stadium: St Andrew's Trillion Trophy Stadium; Attendance: 10,055; Referee: Michael Salisbury

7 March 2020 34	Ipswich Town	0–1	Coventry City	Ipswich
15:00 GMT	Norris (yellow card) 45+3'; Sears (yellow card) 62'; Dozzell (yellow card) 76'	Report	Godden 16'; Walsh (yellow card) 30'; McFadzean (yellow card) 59'; McCallum (yellow card) 90+1'	Stadium: Portman Road; Attendance: 18,882; Referee: Trevor Kettle

14 March 2020	Coventry City	v	Shrewsbury Town	Birmingham
15:00 GMT				Stadium: St Andrew's Trillion Trophy Stadium
Note: Season was suspended until 3 April 2020, due to the COVID-19 pandemic.

21 March 2020	Lincoln City	v	Coventry City	Lincoln
15:00 GMT				Stadium: LNER Stadium
Note: Season was suspended until 3 April 2020, due to the COVID-19 pandemic.

24 March 2020	Coventry City	v	Wycombe Wanderers	Birmingham
19:45 BST				Stadium: St Andrew's Trillion Trophy Stadium
Note: Season was suspended until 3 April 2020, due to the COVID-19 pandemic.

28 March 2020	Accrington Stanley	v	Coventry City	Accrington
15:00 BST				Stadium: Wham Stadium
Note: Season was suspended until 3 April 2020, due to the COVID-19 pandemic.

4 April 2020	Coventry City	v	Peterborough United	Birmingham
15:00 BST				Stadium: St Andrew's Trillion Trophy Stadium

10 April 2020	Gillingham	v	Coventry City	Gillingham
15:00 BST				Stadium: Priestfield Stadium

13 April 2020	Coventry City	v	Oxford United	Birmingham
15:00 BST				Stadium: St Andrew's Trillion Trophy Stadium

18 April 2020	Blackpool	v	Coventry City	Blackpool
15:00 BST				Stadium: Bloomfield Road

25 April 2020	Coventry City	v	Burton Albion	Birmingham
15:00 BST				Stadium: St Andrew's Trillion Trophy Stadium

3 May 2020	AFC Wimbledon	v	Coventry City	Kingston upon Thames
12:00 BST				Stadium: Cherry Red Records Stadium

=== FA Cup ===
The first round draw was made on 21 October 2019. The second round draw was made live on 11 November from Chichester City's stadium, Oaklands Park. The third round draw was made live on BBC Two from Etihad Stadium, Micah Richards and Tony Adams conducted the draw. The fourth round draw was made by Alex Scott and David O'Leary on Monday, 6 January.

9 November 2019 First round	Colchester United	0–2	Coventry City	Colchester
15:00 BST	Jackson (yellow card) 34'; Eastman (yellow card) 83'	Report	Shipley 11'; McCallum 27'; Kelly (yellow card) 58'	Stadium: JobServe Community Stadium; Attendance: 2,919; Referee: Chris Sarginson

1 December 2019 Second round	Coventry City	1–1	Ipswich Town	Birmingham
14:00 GMT	O'Hare 90+4'; Walsh (yellow card) 79'	Report	Keane 51'; Dozzell (yellow card) 67'; Downes (yellow card) 81'	Stadium: St Andrew's Trillion Trophy Stadium; Attendance: 2,878; Referee: Anthony Backhouse

10 December 2019 Second round replay	Ipswich Town	1–2	Coventry City	Ipswich
19:30 GMT	Garbutt 84'	Report	Shipley 18'; Biamou 33'	Stadium: Portman Road; Attendance: 6,515; Referee: Chris Sarginson

5 January 2020 Third round	Bristol Rovers	2–2	Coventry City	Horfield
14:01 GMT	Clarke-Harris 6' (pen.), (yellow card) 44'; Craig 32'; Nichols (yellow card) 36'; Kilgour (yellow card) 76'; Sercombe (yellow card) 78'	Report	McFadzean (yellow card) 5'; Walsh 31'; Dabo (yellow card) 45+2'; Craig 53' (o.g.)	Stadium: Memorial Stadium; Attendance: 7,000; Referee: Gavin Ward

14 January 2020 Third round replay	Coventry City	3–0	Bristol Rovers	Birmingham
19:45 GMT	Biamou 4', 56'; Pask 50'	Report	Craig (yellow card) 22'; Menayese (yellow card) 69'; Clarke (yellow card) 90+4'	Stadium: St Andrew's Trillion Trophy Stadium; Attendance: 2,693; Referee: Anthony Backhouse

25 January 2020 Fourth round	Coventry City	0–0	Birmingham City	Birmingham
15:00 GMT		Report	Pedersen (yellow card) 87'; Clarke-Salter (yellow card) 88'; Jutkiewicz (yellow card) 90+1'	Stadium: St Andrew's Trillion Trophy Stadium; Attendance: 21,193; Referee: Tim Robinson

4 February 2020 Fourth round replay	Birmingham City	2–2 (4–1 p)	Coventry City	Birmingham
19:45 GMT	Dean 90+2'; Bela 120'; Concannon (yellow card) 26'; Harding (yellow card) 109'		Bakayoko 50', (yellow card) 41'; Biamou 114'; Pask (yellow card) 36'	Stadium: St Andrew's Trillion Trophy Stadium; Attendance: 11,680; Referee: Darren Bond
	Penalties
	Jutkiewicz (penalty scored); Bela (penalty scored); Gardner (penalty scored); Dean (penalty scored)		Godden (penalty scored); Walsh (penalty missed); Allen (penalty missed)

=== EFL Cup ===
The first round draw was made on 20 June. The second round draw was made on 13 August 2019 following the conclusion of all but one first-round matches.

13 August 2019 First round	Coventry City	4–1	Exeter City	Birmingham
19:45 BST	Hiwula 2', 28'; Godden 23'; Bakayoko 88'; Kelly (yellow card) 86'; Kastaneer (yellow card) 90+5'	Report	Sweeney 81'; Tillson (yellow card) 85'	Stadium: St Andrew's Trillion Trophy Stadium; Attendance: 1,555; Referee: Scott Oldham

27 August 2019 Second round	Watford	3–0	Coventry City	Watford
19:45 BST	Sarr 37'; Janmaat 56'; Peñaranda 69'	Report	Dabo (yellow card) 75'	Stadium: Vicarage Road; Attendance: 12,257; Referee: Gavin Ward

=== EFL Trophy ===
On 9 July 2019, the pre-determined group stage draw was announced with Invited clubs to be drawn on 12 July 2019. The draw for the second round was made on 16 November 2019 live on Sky Sports.

Pos	Div	Team	Pld	W	PW	PL	L	GF	GA	GD	Pts	Qualification
1	L2	Walsall	3	2	0	1	0	7	0	+7	7	Advance to Round 2
2	L1	Coventry City	3	1	1	1	0	3	2	+1	6	Advance to Round 2
3	L2	Forest Green Rovers	3	1	1	0	1	3	8	−5	5	
4	ACA	Southampton U21	3	0	0	0	3	4	7	−3	0	

Source: EFL.com

3 September 2019 Group stage	Coventry City	0–0 (5–4 p)	Walsall	Birmingham
19:45 BST	Watson (yellow card) 25'; Bapaga (yellow card) 90+1'	Report	Bates (yellow card) 38'; Pring (yellow card) 62'	Stadium: St Andrew's Trillion Trophy Stadium; Attendance: 1,005; Referee: Will Finnie
	Penalties
	Biamou (penalty scored); Bakayoko (penalty missed); McFadzean (penalty missed); Eccles (penalty scored); Bapaga (penalty scored); McCallum (penalty scored); Watson (penalty scored)		Gaffney (penalty missed); Norman (penalty scored); Adebayo (penalty missed); Hardy (penalty scored); Liddle (penalty scored); Bates (penalty scored); Kinsella (penalty missed)

8 October 2019 Group stage	Forest Green Rovers	0–0 (8–7 p)	Coventry City	Nailsworth
19:00 BST		Report	Bakayoko (yellow card) 29'; McFadzean (yellow card) 70'; Kastaneer (yellow card) 73'	Stadium: The New Lawn; Attendance: 924; Referee: David Rock
	Penalties
	Stevens (penalty scored); Morton (penalty scored); Adams (penalty missed); Bernard (penalty scored); Mondal (penalty scored); Allen (penalty scored); Covil (penalty scored); McGinley (penalty scored); Godwin-Malife (penalty scored)		Godden (penalty scored); Westbrooke (penalty scored); O'Hare (penalty scored); Kelly (penalty missed); Rose (penalty scored); Watson (penalty scored); Eccles (penalty scored); McCallum (penalty scored); McFadzean (penalty missed)

5 November 2019 Group stage	Coventry City	3–2	Southampton U21	Birmingham
19:00 BST	Biamou 52', 55' (pen.), 90+3'	Report	Slattery 61' (pen.), 84'; Kpohomouh (yellow card) 73'; Defise (yellow card) 90'	Stadium: St Andrew's Trillion Trophy Stadium; Attendance: 375; Referee: Ben Toner

3 December 2019 Second round	Milton Keynes Dons	2–0	Coventry City	Denbigh
19:45 GMT	Agard 61'; Mason 71'; McGrandles (yellow card) 57'; Gilbey (yellow card) 58'; Dickenson (yellow card) 79' (yellow-red card) 85'	Report	Kastaneer (yellow card) 75'; Watson (yellow card) 80'	Stadium: Stadium MK; Attendance: 1,686; Referee: Charles Breakspear

== Squad information ==
=== Squad details ===
No.	Name	Position	Nationality	Place of birth	Date of birth (age) *	Club apps *	Club goals *	Signed from	Date signed	Fee	Contract end
Goalkeepers
1	Marko Maroši	GK	(Slovakia)	Michalovce	23 October 1993 (aged 25)	0	0	Doncaster Rovers	1 July 2019	Free	30 June 2022
13	Ben Wilson	GK	(England)	Stanley	9 August 1992 (aged 26)	0	0	Bradford City	1 July 2019	Free	30 June 2022
Defenders
3	Brandon Mason	LB	(England)	Westminster	30 September 1997 (aged 21)	28	0	Watford	6 July 2018	Free	30 June 2022
4	Michael Rose	CB	(Scotland)	Aberdeen	11 October 1995 (aged 23)	0	0	Ayr United	1 July 2019	Free	30 June 2021
5	Kyle McFadzean	CB	(England)	Sheffield	20 February 1987 (aged 32)	0	0	Burton Albion	1 July 2019	Free	30 June 2021
12	Junior Brown	LB	(England)	Crewe	7 May 1989 (aged 30)	23	0	Shrewsbury Town	1 July 2018	Free	30 June 2020
15	Dominic Hyam	CB	(Scotland) (England)	Leuchars	20 December 1995 (aged 23)	63	1	Reading	1 July 2017	Free	30 June 2022
16	Josh Pask	CB	(England)	Waltham Forest	1 November 1997 (aged 21)	0	0	West Ham United	1 July 2018	Free	30 June 2022
23	Fankaty Dabo	RB	(England)	Southwark	11 October 1995 (aged 23)	0	0	Chelsea	1 July 2019	Free	30 June 2022
27	Jordon Thompson	CB	(England)	Islington	8 April 1999 (aged 20)	9	0	Academy	1 July 2016	Trainee	30 June 2021
29	Jak Hickman	RB	(England)	Sandwell	11 September 1998 (aged 20)	2	0	Academy	1 July 2016	Trainee	30 June 2021
31	Sam McCallum	LB	(England)	Canterbury	2 September 2000 (aged 18)	8	0	V9 Academy	9 August 2018	Free	30 June 2022
35	Declan Drysdale	CB	(England)	Birkenhead	14 November 1999 (aged 19)	0	0	Tranmere Rovers	4 January 2019	Compensation	30 June 2021
37	Morgan Williams	CB	(England)	Derby	3 August 1998 (aged 20)	4	0	Mickleover Sports	2 July 2018	Undisclosed	30 June 2020
46	Blaine Rowe	RB	(England)	Coventry	22 March 2002 (aged 17)	0	0	Academy	1 July 2019	Trainee	30 June 2020
48	Joe Newton	LB	(England)	Coventry	22 June 2001 (aged 18)	0	0				30 June 2021
Midfielders
6	Liam Kelly	DM	(Scotland) (England)	Newport Pagnell	10 February 1990 (aged 29)	70	1	Leyton Orient	1 July 2017	Free	30 June 2021
7	Jodi Jones	RW	(England) (Malta)	Bow	22 October 1997 (aged 21)	83	8	Dagenham & Redbridge	10 May 2016	Undisclosed	30 June 2021
8	Jamie Allen	CM	(England)	Rochdale	29 January 1995 (aged 24)	0	0	Burton Albion	1 July 2019	Undisclosed	30 June 2022
10	Wesley Jobello	RW	(Martinique) (France)	Gennevilliers	23 January 1994 (aged 25)	0	0	Gazélec Ajaccio	1 July 2019	Undisclosed	30 June 2022
14	Reise Allassani	RW	(England)	London	3 January 1996 (aged 23)	6	0	Dulwich Hamlet	1 July 2018	Undisclosed	30 June 2020
17	Callum O'Hare	AM	(England)	Solihull	1 May 1998 (aged 21)	0	0	Aston Villa	22 August 2019	Loan	30 June 2020
18	Ryan Giles	LW	(England)	Telford	26 January 2000 (aged 19)	0	0	Wolverhampton Wanderers	31 January 2020	Loan	30 June 2020
20	Liam Walsh	CM	(England)	Huyton	15 September 1997 (aged 21)	0	0	Bristol City	2 September 2019	Loan	30 June 2020
25	Zain Westbrooke	CM	(England)	Chertsey	28 October 1996 (aged 22)	9	0	Brentford	10 May 2018	Free	30 June 2020
26	Jordan Shipley	CM	(Republic of Ireland) (England)	Leamington Spa	26 September 1997 (aged 21)	78	9	Academy	1 July 2016	Trainee	30 June 2021
28	Callum Maycock	CM	(England)	Birmingham	23 December 1997 (aged 21)	12	0	Academy	1 July 2016	Trainee	30 June 2020
30	Bouwe Bosma	DM	(England)	Liverpool	24 May 1996 (aged 23)	0	0	Lewes	1 July 2018	Undisclosed	30 June 2020
32	Dexter Walters	LW	(England)	Birmingham	4 December 1998 (aged 20)	1	0	Tamworth	3 August 2018	Undisclosed	30 June 2020
33	Gervane Kastaneer	LW	(Curaçao) (Netherlands)	Rotterdam	9 June 1996 (aged 23)	0	0	NAC Breda	1 July 2019	Undisclosed	30 June 2022
38	Josh Eccles	CM	(England)	Coventry	6 April 2000 (aged 19)	1	0	Academy	14 August 2016	Trainee	30 June 2021
39	Daniel Bartlett	CM	(England)	Poole	13 October 2000 (aged 18)	0	0	Southampton	1 July 2019	Free	30 June 2021
44	Charlie Wakefield	RW	(England)	Worthing	9 April 1998 (aged 21)	8	0	Chelsea	31 January 2019	Free	30 June 2020
45	Jack Burroughs	MF	(Scotland) (England)	Coventry	21 March 2001 (aged 18)	2	0	Academy	7 August 2017	Trainee	30 June 2019
47	Jordan Young	CM	(Scotland) (England)	Chippenham	31 July 1999 (aged 19)	0	0	Swindon Town	16 August 2019	Free	30 June 2020
	Aaron Evans-Harriott	MF	(Wales) (England)	Evesham	16 September 2002 (aged 16)	0	0	Cheltenham Town	28 February 2020	Compensation	30 June 2022
Forwards
9	Maxime Biamou	CF	(France)	Créteil	13 November 1990 (aged 28)	54	9	Sutton United	1 July 2017	Undisclosed	30 June 2021
11	Jordy Hiwula	FW	(England)	Manchester	21 September 1994 (aged 24)	43	13	Huddersfield Town	2 August 2018	Undisclosed	30 June 2020
19	Jordan Ponticelli	CF	(England)	Nuneaton	10 September 1998 (aged 20)	32	6	Strachan Football Foundation	26 July 2016	Free	30 June 2022
21	Amadou Bakayoko	CF	(Sierra Leone) (England)	Freetown	1 January 1996 (aged 23)	35	7	Walsall	7 August 2018	Undisclosed	30 June 2020
24	Matt Godden	CF	(England)	Canterbury	29 July 1991 (aged 28)	0	0	Peterborough United	6 August 2019	Undisclosed	30 June 2022
40	Jonny Ngandu	FW	(England)	Redbridge	25 October 2001 (aged 17)	1	0	Academy	7 August 2017	Trainee	30 June 2019
41	Will Bapaga	LW	(England)	Coventry	Missing required parameter 1=month! 2002 (aged 16–17)	0	0	Academy	3 August 2019	Free	30 June 2022
43	David Bremang	CF	(England)	Hammersmith	21 January 2000 (aged 19)	0	0	Conquest Academy	11 September 2018	Free	30 June 2020
Left before the end of the season
2	Tennai Watson	RB	(England)	Hillingdon	4 March 1997 (aged 22)	0	0	Reading	30 August 2019	Loan	2 January 2020
34	Corey Addai	GK	(England)	Hackney	10 October 1997 (aged 21)	0	0	Academy	1 June 2014	Trainee	30 June 2020

* Player age and appearances/goals for the club as of beginning of 2019–20 season.

=== Appearances ===
Correct as of match played on 7 March 2020

No.	Nat.	Player	Pos.	League One	FA Cup	EFL Cup	EFL Trophy	Total
1	(Slovakia)	Marko Maroši	GK	34	6			40
3	(England)	Brandon Mason	DF	10+1	2+1	1	2	17
4	(Scotland)	Michael Rose	DF	30+1	6	2	1	40
5	(England)	Kyle McFadzean	DF	28+2	7		3	40
6	(Scotland)	Liam Kelly	MF	25+2	7	2	1	37
7	(England)	Jodi Jones	MF		0+1		0+1	2
8	(England)	Jamie Allen	MF	7+4	2+2		1	16
9	(France)	Maxime Biamou	FW	5+13	4+1		1+2	26
10	(Martinique)	Wesley Jobello	MF	10		1		11
11	(England)	Jordy Hiwula	FW	14+1		2	1	18
12	(England)	Junior Brown	DF					
13	(England)	Ben Wilson	GK		1	2	4	7
14	(England)	Reise Allassani	MF					
15	(Scotland)	Dominic Hyam	DF	28+1	6	2		37
16	(England)	Josh Pask	DF	0+2	2			4
17	(England)	Callum O'Hare	MF	18+11	2+5	1	2+1	40
18	(England)	Ryan Giles	MF	0+1				1
19	(England)	Jordan Ponticelli	FW					
20	(England)	Liam Walsh	MF	25+1	6+1		1	34
21	(Sierra Leone)	Amadou Bakayoko	FW	11+12	2+3	1+1	3	33
23	(England)	Fankaty Dabo	DF	32	6	2	0+1	41
24	(England)	Matt Godden	FW	22+4	2+2	1+1	0+1	33
25	(England)	Zain Westbrooke	MF	22+3	5+1	1	1	33
26	(Republic of Ireland)	Jordan Shipley	MF	24+7	6+1	1+1	1+1	42
27	(England)	Jordon Thompson	DF					
28	(England)	Callum Maycock	MF					
29	(England)	Jak Hickman	DF					
30	(England)	Bouwe Bosma	DF					
31	(England)	Sam McCallum	DF	25+1	4	1+1	2	34
32	(England)	Dexter Walters	MF					
33	(Curaçao)	Gervane Kastaneer	MF	1+9		1+1	3+1	16
35	(England)	Declan Drysdale	DF	1			2	3
37	(England)	Morgan Williams	DF				2	2
38	(England)	Josh Eccles	MF	1+2	0+2	1+1	4	11
39	(England)	Daniel Bartlett	MF				1	1
40	(England)	Jonny Ngandu	FW					
41	(England)	Will Bapaga	FW	0+1			2+1	4
42	(England)	Tom Billson	GK					
43	(England)	David Bremang	FW					
44	(England)	Charlie Wakefield	MF	0+1			2	3
45	(Scotland)	Jack Burroughs	MF				0+1	1
46	(England)	Blaine Rowe	DF					
47	(Scotland)	Jordan Young	MF				0+1	1
48	(England)	Joe Newton	DF					
50	(Wales)	Cian Tyler	GK					
	(Wales)	Aaron Evans-Harriott	MF					
Left before the end of the season
2	(England)	Tennai Watson	DF	1+2			4	7
34	(Ghana)	Corey Addai	GK					

=== Goalscorers ===
Correct as of match played on 7 March 2020

No.	Nat.	Player	Pos.	League One	FA Cup	EFL Cup	EFL Trophy	Total
24	(England)	Matt Godden	FW	14	0	1	0	15
9	(France)	Maxime Biamou	FW	4	4	0	3	11
26	(Republic of Ireland)	Jordan Shipley	MF	5	2	0	0	7
21	(Sierra Leone)	Amadou Bakayoko	FW	4	1	1	0	6
11	(England)	Jordy Hiwula	FW	2	0	2	0	4
17	(England)	Callum O'Hare	MF	3	1	0	0	4
20	(England)	Liam Walsh	MF	3	1	0	0	4
25	(England)	Zain Westbrooke	MF	4	0	0	0	4
31	(England)	Sam McCallum	DF	2	1	0	0	3
4	(Scotland)	Michael Rose	DF	2	0	0	0	2
15	(Scotland)	Dominic Hyam	DF	2	0	0	0	2
8	(England)	Jamie Allen	MF	1	0	0	0	1
10	(Martinique)	Wesley Jobello	MF	1	0	0	0	1
16	(England)	Josh Pask	DF	0	1	0	0	1
33	(Curaçao)	Gervane Kastaneer	MF	1	0	0	0	1
Own Goals				0	1	0	0	1
Totals				48	12	4	3	67

=== Assists ===
Correct as of match played on 7 March 2020

No.	Nat.	Player	Pos.	League One	FA Cup	EFL Cup	EFL Trophy	Total
17	(England)	Callum O'Hare	MF	4	3	0	0	7
26	(Republic of Ireland)	Jordan Shipley	MF	5	2	0	0	7
20	(England)	Liam Walsh	MF	5	1	0	0	6
25	(England)	Zain Westbrooke	MF	2	2	1	0	5
6	(England)	Liam Kelly	MF	3	0	0	0	3
8	(England)	Jamie Allen	MF	3	0	0	0	3
23	(England)	Fankaty Dabo	DF	2	0	1	0	3
4	(Scotland)	Michael Rose	DF	1	0	1	0	2
9	(France)	Maxime Biamou	FW	1	1	0	0	2
11	(England)	Jordy Hiwula	FW	2	0	0	0	2
24	(England)	Matt Godden	FW	2	0	0	0	2
5	(England)	Kyle McFadzean	DF	1	0	0	0	1
10	(Martinique)	Wesley Jobello	MF	1	0	0	0	1
21	(Sierra Leone)	Amadou Bakayoko	FW	0	1	0	0	1
31	(England)	Sam McCallum	DF	1	0	0	0	1
38	(England)	Josh Eccles	MF	0	0	0	1	1
Totals				32	10	3	1	46

=== Yellow cards ===
Correct as of match played on 7 March 2020

No.	Nat.	Player	Pos.	League One	FA Cup	EFL Cup	EFL Trophy	Total
5	(England)	Kyle McFadzean	DF	7	1	0	1	9
23	(England)	Fankaty Dabo	DF	7	1	1	0	9
20	(England)	Liam Walsh	MF	5	1	0	0	6
31	(England)	Sam McCallum	DF	6	0	0	0	6
6	(Scotland)	Liam Kelly	MF	2	1	1	0	4
21	(Sierra Leone)	Amadou Bakayoko	FW	2	1	0	1	4
33	(Curaçao)	Gervane Kastaneer	MF	1	0	1	2	4
1	(Slovakia)	Marko Maroši	GK	3	0	0	0	3
17	(England)	Callum O'Hare	MF	3	0	0	0	3
2	(England)	Tennai Watson	DF	0	0	0	2	2
26	(Republic of Ireland)	Jordan Shipley	MF	2	0	0	0	2
4	(Scotland)	Michael Rose	DF	1	0	0	0	1
15	(Scotland)	Dominic Hyam	DF	1	0	0	0	1
16	(England)	Josh Pask	DF	0	1	0	0	1
24	(England)	Matt Godden	FW	1	0	0	0	1
25	(England)	Zain Westbrooke	MF	1	0	0	0	1
35	(England)	Declan Drysdale	DF	1	0	0	0	1
41	(England)	Will Bapaga	FW	0	0	0	1	1
Totals				42	6	2	7	57

=== Red cards ===
Correct as of match played on 7 March 2020

No.	Nat.	Player	Pos.	League One	FA Cup	EFL Cup	EFL Trophy	Total
5	(England)	Kyle McFadzean	DF	1	0	0	0	1
9	(France)	Maxime Biamou	FW	1	0	0	0	1
23	(England)	Fankaty Dabo	DF	1	0	0	0	1
33	(Curaçao)	Gervane Kastaneer	MF	1	0	0	0	1
Totals				4	0	0	0	4

=== Captains ===
Correct as of match played on 7 March 2020

No.	Nat.	Player	Pos.	League One	FA Cup	EFL Cup	EFL Trophy	Total
6	(Scotland)	Liam Kelly	MF	25	7	2	1	35
5	(England)	Kyle McFadzean	DF	5	0	0	2	7
26	(Republic of Ireland)	Jordan Shipley	MF	2	0	0	0	2
4	(Scotland)	Michael Rose	DF	1	0	0	0	1
24	(England)	Matt Godden	FW	1	0	0	0	1
37	(England)	Morgan Williams	DF	0	0	0	1	1
Totals				34	7	2	4	47

=== Penalties awarded ===
No.	Nat.	Player	Pos.	Date	Opponents	Ground	Success
24	(England)	Matt Godden	FW	20 August 2019	Portsmouth	Fratton Park	✓
11	(England)	Jordy Hiwula	FW	19 October 2019	Milton Keynes Dons	Stadium MK	✗
25	(England)	Zain Westbrooke	MF	23 October 2019	Fleetwood Town	St Andrew's	✓
9	(France)	Maxime Biamou	FW	5 November 2019	Southampton U21	St Andrew's	✓
24	(England)	Matt Godden	FW	29 December 2019	Wycombe Wanderers	Adams Park	✓
24	(England)	Matt Godden	FW	1 January 2020	Tranmere Rovers	Prenton Park	✓

=== Suspensions served ===
No.	Nat.	Player	Pos.	Date suspended	Reason	Matches missed
23	(England)	Fankaty Dabo	DF	24 August 2019	1 red card	Gillingham (H)
33	(Curaçao)	Gervane Kastaneer	MF	24 August 2019	1 red card	Gillingham (H)
5	(England)	Kyle McFadzean	DF	5 October 2019	1 red card	Tranmere Rovers (H)
23	(England)	Fankaty Dabo	DF	26 October 2019	5 yellow cards	Accrington Stanley (H)
9	(France)	Maxime Biamou	FW	2 November 2019	1 red card	Colchester United (A); Rochdale (H); Sunderland (A)
5	(England)	Kyle McFadzean	DF	2 November 2019	5 yellow cards	Rochdale (H)

=== Hat-tricks ===
No.	Nat.	Player	Pos.	Date	Opponents	Ground	Result
9	(France)	Maxime Biamou	FW	5 November 2019	Southampton U21	St Andrew's	3–2
24	(England)	Matt Godden	FW	29 December 2019	Wycombe Wanderers	Adams Park	4–1
24	(England)	Matt Godden	FW	1 January 2020	Tranmere Rovers	Prenton Park	4–1

=== Monthly & weekly awards ===
No.	Nat.	Player	Pos.	Date	Award	Ref
10	(Martinique)	Wesley Jobello	MF	10 September 2019	EFL Team of the Week	
	(England)	Mark Robins		10 September 2019	EFL Team of the Week	
24	(England)	Matt Godden	FW	3 January 2020	EFL Team of the Week	
4	(Scotland)	Michael Rose	DF	23 February 2020	EFL Team of the Week	

=== End-of-season awards ===
No.	Nat.	Player	Pos.	Date	Award	Ref
24	(England)	Matt Godden	FW	20 June 2020	CCFC Top Goalscorer	
23	(England)	Fankaty Dabo	DF	20 June 2020	CCFC Player of the Season	
20	(England)	Liam Walsh	MF	20 June 2020	CCFC Young Player of the Season	
20	(England)	Liam Walsh	MF	20 June 2020	CCFC Players' Player of the Season	
20	(England)	Liam Walsh	MF	20 June 2020	CCFC Goal of the Season	
26	(Republic of Ireland)	Jordan Shipley	MF	20 June 2020	CCFC Community Player of the Season	
	(England)	Shelagh Brock		20 June 2020	CCFC Michelle Ridley Award	
	(England)	Mark Robins		27 July 2020	League Managers Association Awards Manager of the Year	
1	(Slovakia)	Marko Maroši	GK	8 September 2020	PFA League One Team of the Year	
20	(England)	Liam Walsh	MF	8 September 2020	PFA League One Team of the Year	
23	(England)	Fankaty Dabo	DF	8 September 2020	PFA League One Team of the Year	
24	(England)	Matt Godden	FW	8 September 2020	PFA League One Team of the Year	

== Transfers ==
=== Transfers in ===
Date	Position	Nationality	Name	From	Fee	Ref.
1 July 2019	CM	(England)	Jamie Allen	(England) Burton Albion	Undisclosed	
1 July 2019	CM	(England)	Daniel Bartlett	(England) Southampton	Free transfer	
1 July 2019	RB	(England)	Fankaty Dabo	(England) Chelsea	Free transfer	
1 July 2019	RW	(Martinique)	Wesley Jobello	(France) Gazélec Ajaccio	Undisclosed	
1 July 2019	LW	(Curaçao)	Gervane Kastaneer	(Netherlands) NAC Breda	Undisclosed	
1 July 2019	GK	(Slovakia)	Marko Maroši	(England) Doncaster Rovers	Free transfer	
1 July 2019	CB	(England)	Kyle McFadzean	(England) Burton Albion	Free transfer	
1 July 2019	CB	(England)	Josh Pask	(England) West Ham United	Free transfer	
1 July 2019	CB	(Scotland)	Michael Rose	(Scotland) Ayr United	Free transfer	
1 July 2019	GK	(England)	Ben Wilson	(England) Bradford City	Free transfer	
6 August 2019	CF	(England)	Matt Godden	(England) Peterborough United	Undisclosed	
16 August 2019	MF	(Scotland)	Jordan Young	(England) Swindon Town	Free transfer	
2 September 2019	DF	(England)	Joe Newton	(England) Royston Town	Undisclosed	
28 February 2020	MF	(Wales)	Aaron Evans-Harriott	(England) Cheltenham Town	Compensation	

=== Transfers out ===
Date	Position	Nationality	Name	To	Fee	Ref.
1 July 2019	AM	(France)	Tony Andreu	(Scotland) St Mirren	Released	
1 July 2019	CF	(England)	Stuart Beavon	(England) Nuneaton Borough	Released	
1 July 2019	GK	(England)	Lee Burge	(England) Sunderland	Released	
1 July 2019	LB	(England)	Chris Camwell	(England) Nuneaton Borough	Released	
1 July 2019	CB	(England)	Tom Davies	(England) Bristol Rovers	Released	
1 July 2019	DF	(Republic of Ireland)	Reece Ford	(England) Stratford Town	Released	
1 July 2019	RB	(Scotland)	Jack Grimmer	(England) Wycombe Wanderers	Released	
1 July 2019	GK	(England)	Liam O'Brien	(England) Yeovil Town	Released	
1 July 2019	MF	(England)	Billy Stedman	(Iceland) Víkingur	Released	
1 July 2019	CB	(England)	Jordan Willis	(England) Sunderland	Released	
19 July 2019	FW	(England)	Conor Chaplin	(England) Barnsley	Undisclosed	
2 August 2019	CM	(England)	Tom Bayliss	(England) Preston North End	Undisclosed	
31 January 2020	GK	(England)	Corey Addai	(England) Barnsley	Mutual Consent	
31 January 2020	LB	(England)	Sam McCallum	(England) Norwich City	Undisclosed	

=== Loans in ===
Date from	Position	Nationality	Name	To	Date until	Ref.
22 August 2019	AM	(England)	Callum O'Hare	(England) Aston Villa	30 June 2020	
30 August 2019	RB	(England)	Tennai Watson	(England) Reading	1 January 2020	
2 September 2019	CM	(England)	Liam Walsh	(England) Bristol City	30 June 2020	
31 January 2020	LW	(England)	Ryan Giles	(England) Wolverhampton Wanderers	30 June 2020	
31 January 2020	LB	(England)	Sam McCallum	(England) Norwich City	30 June 2020	

=== Loans out ===
Date from	Position	Nationality	Name	To	Date until	Ref.
8 July 2019	CB	(England)	Jordon Thompson	(England) Boreham Wood	31 January 2020	
10 July 2019	CF	(England)	Jordan Ponticelli	(England) Tranmere Rovers	January 2020	
2 August 2019	GK	(England)	Corey Addai	(England) AFC Telford United	2 September 2019	
24 August 2019	RW	(England)	Reise Allassani	(England) Dulwich Hamlet	4 January 2020	
29 August 2019	LB	(England)	Junior Brown	(England) Scunthorpe United	25 April 2020	
10 September 2019	GK	(England)	Tom Billson	(England) Barwell	8 November 2019	
12 September 2019	GK	(England)	Corey Addai	(England) Redditch United	4 January 2020	
4 October 2019	LW	(England)	Dexter Walters	(England) Leamington	30 June 2020	
19 October 2019	CM	(England)	Callum Maycock	(England) Leamington	30 June 2020	
7 December 2019	CF	(England)	David Bremang	(England) Nuneaton Borough	January 2020	
7 December 2019	DF	(England)	Morgan Williams	(England) Yeovil Town	January 2020	
13 December 2019	MF	(Scotland)	Jack Burroughs	(England) Nuneaton Borough	January 2020	
10 January 2020	CF	(England)	David Bremang	(England) Leamington	February 2020	
22 January 2020	CF	(England)	Jordan Ponticelli	(Wales) Wrexham	30 June 2020	
23 January 2020	GK	(Wales)	Cian Tyler	(England) Barwell	February 2020	
24 January 2020	CB	(England)	Declan Drysdale	(England) Solihull Moors	February 2020	
31 January 2020	CB	(England)	Jordon Thompson	(Wales) Wrexham	28 February 2020	
28 February 2020	GK	(Wales)	Cian Tyler	(England) AFC Rushden & Diamonds	April 2020	
