= Wesley Jobello =

Association football player (born 1994)

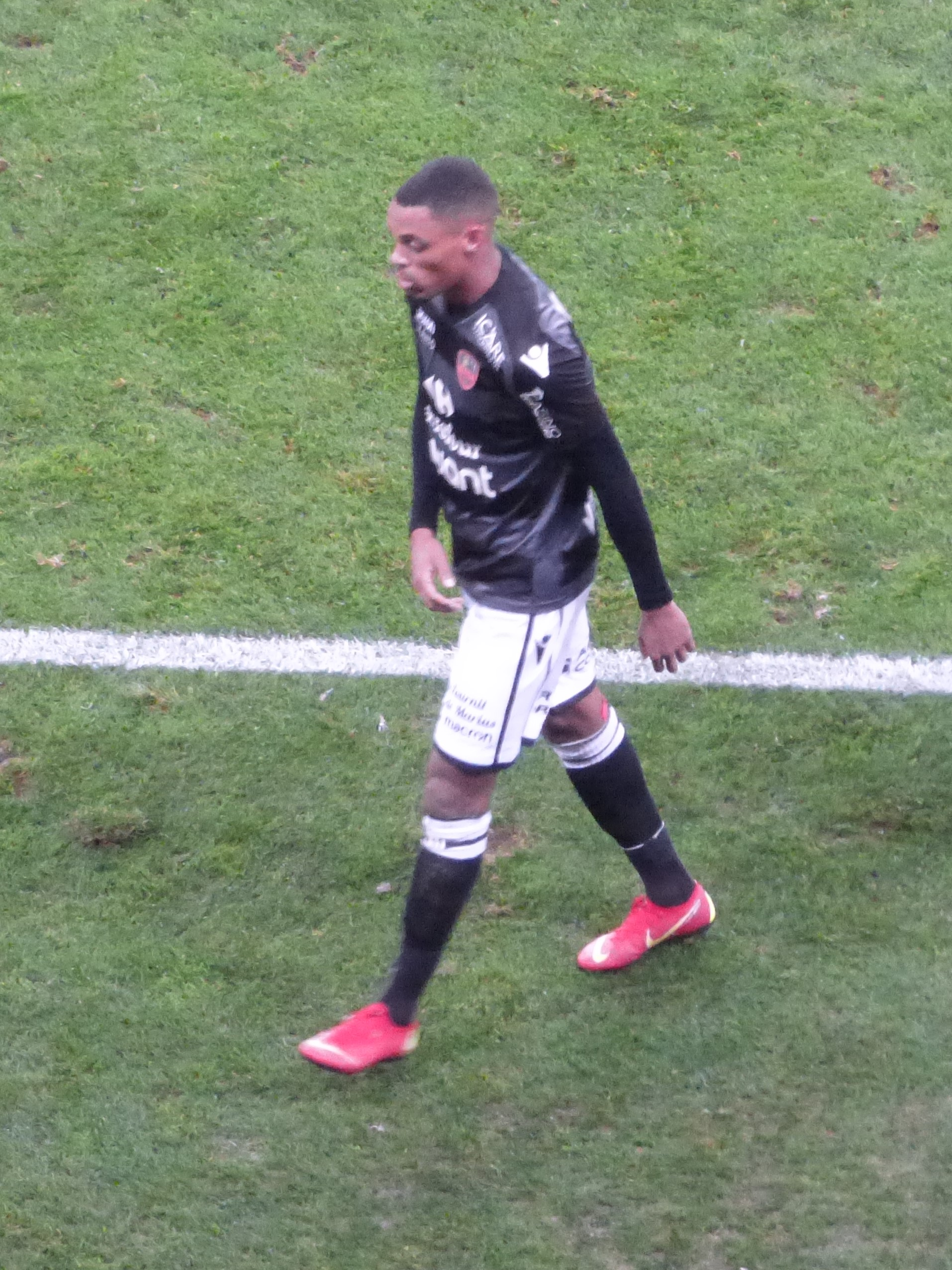
- Jobello with Gazélec Ajaccio in 2018

Personal information
- Full name: Wesley Georges Jobello
- Date of birth: 23 January 1994 (age 32)
- Place of birth: Gennevilliers, France
- Height: 1.79 m (5 ft 10 1/2 in)
- Position: Midfielder

Youth career
- 1999–2006: Melun
- 2006–2008: Le Mée
- 2008–2009: Viry-Châtillon
- 2009–2012: Marseille

Senior career*
Years	Team	Apps	(Gls)
2012–2014	Marseille	1	(0)
2012–2014	Marseille B	52	(14)
2015–2017	Clermont	53	(3)
2015–2016	Clermont B	2	(0)
2017–2019	Gazélec Ajaccio	61	(4)
2019–2022	Coventry City	13	(1)
2022	Boulogne	11	(0)
2022–2023	UTA Arad	17	(0)
2023–2024	Argeș Pitești	14	(1)
2024–2025	Preston Lions	26	(5)

International career
2012	France U18	2	(0)
2018–2019	Martinique	3	(1)
- * Club domestic league appearances and goals as of 17 August 2024

Wesley Georges Jobello (born 23 January 1994) is a professional footballer who last played as a midfielder for Victoria Premier League 1 side Preston Lions in Australia. Born in metropolitan France, he represents Martinique at international level.

== Club career ==
Jobello was born in Gennevilliers, and made his professional debut on 20 May 2012 in a league match against Sochaux, appearing as a substitute.

On 14 June 2019, Jobello signed a three-year contract with EFL League One side Coventry City for an undisclosed fee. On 13 January 2022, Jobello was released from Coventry City after his contract was terminated by mutual consent.

On 29 January 2022, Jobello signed with Boulogne in the Championnat National. He joined Romanian club UTA Arad in July 2022.

== International career ==
Jobello is formerly a France youth international, having represented his nation at under-18 level, but switched and currently represents the Martinique national football team at senior level. In May 2019, Jobello was named to Martinique's 40-man provisional squad for the 2019 CONCACAF Gold Cup.

== Career statistics ==
=== Club ===
As of match played 29 May 2023

Appearances and goals by club, season and competition
Club	Season	League			National cup		League cup		Other		Total	
Club	Season	Division	Apps	Goals	Apps	Goals	Apps	Goals	Apps	Goals	Apps	Goals
Marseille	2011–12	Ligue 1	1	0	0	0	0	0	—		1	0
Marseille	2012–13	Ligue 1	0	0	0	0	0	0	2 (Note: Appearances in the UEFA Europa League)	0	2	0
Marseille	Total		1	0	0	0	0	0	2	0	3	0
Marseille B	2012–13	CFA 2	20	4	—		—		—		20	4
Marseille B	2013–14	CFA 2	8	2	—		—		—		8	2
Marseille B	2014–15	CFA 2	24	8	—		—		—		24	8
Marseille B	Total		52	14	—		—		—		52	14
Clermont	2015–16	Ligue 2	26	0	1	0	2	3	—		29	3
Clermont	2016–17	Ligue 2	27	3	2	1	3	1	—		32	5
Clermont	Total		53	3	3	1	5	4	—		61	8
Clermont B	2015–16	CFA 2	2	0	—		—		—		2	0
Gazélec Ajaccio	2017–18	Ligue 2	24	2	3	1	0	0	—		27	3
Gazélec Ajaccio	2018–19	Ligue 2	37	2	2	0	1	0	2 (Note: Appearances in the 2019 Ligue 2 relegation play-offs)	1	42	3
Gazélec Ajaccio	Total		61	4	5	1	1	0	2	1	69	6
Coventry City	2019–20	EFL League One	10	1	0	0	1	0	0	0	11	1
Coventry City	2020–21	EFL Championship	3	0	0	0	0	0	—		3	0
Coventry City	Total		13	1	0	0	1	0	—		14	1
Boulogne	2021–22	National	11	0	0	0	—		—		11	0
UTA Arad	2022–23	Liga I	17	0	3	1	—		—		20	1
Argeș Pitești	2022–23	Liga I	14	1	0	0	—		1 (Note: All appearances in Liga I promotion/relegation play-offs)	0	15	1
Career totals			224	23	11	3	7	4	5	1	247	31

== International statistics ==
As of match played 23 March 2019

Appearances and goals by national team and year
National team	Year	Apps	Goals
Martinique	2018	1	1
Martinique	2019	2	0
Total		5	0

=== International goals ===
Scores and results list Martinique's goal tally first.

No.	Date	Venue	Opponent	Score	Result	Competition
1	23 March 2019	Stade René Serge Nabajoth, Les Abymes, Guadeloupe	Guadeloupe	1–0	1–0	2019–20 CONCACAF Nations League qualification

== Honours ==
Coventry City

- EFL League One: 2019–20
