= Aaron Evans =

Aaron Evans may refer to:

- Aaron Evans (footballer) (born 1994), Australian footballer
- Aaron Evans (TV personality) (born 1997), English television personality
- Aaron Evans (fl. 2010s–2020s), musician with Like Moths to Flames

== See also ==
- Aaron Evans-Harriott (born 2002), English footballer
