= Callum O'Hare =

English footballer

Personal information
- Full name: Callum Luke O'Hare
- Date of birth: 1 May 1998 (age 28)
- Place of birth: Solihull, England
- Height: 5 ft 9 in (1.76 m)
- Position: Attacking midfielder

Team information
- Current team: Wrexham
- Number: 17

Youth career
- –2016: Aston Villa

Senior career*
Years	Team	Apps	(Gls)
2016–2020	Aston Villa	4	(0)
2019	→ Carlisle United (loan)	16	(3)
2019–2020	→ Coventry City (loan)	40	(4)
2020–2024	Coventry City	133	(22)
2024–2026	Sheffield United	92	(12)
2026–	Wrexham	7	(1)

International career^{‡}
2017	England U20	1	(0)
- * Club domestic league appearances and goals as of 18:49, 1 September 2026 (UTC) ‡ National team caps and goals as of 19:21, 25 November 2017 (UTC)

Callum Luke O'Hare (born 1 May 1998) is an English professional footballer who plays as an attacking midfielder for EFL Championship club Wrexham. He has previously played for Sheffield United, Coventry City and Aston Villa, as well as a loan spell with Carlisle United. O'Hare initially joined Coventry on loan from Aston Villa in 2019 and was part of the side that won the 2019–20 EFL League One title.

O'Hare is a product of the Aston Villa Academy, spending fifteen years at the club, and has represented England at Under-20 level.

== Career ==
=== Aston Villa ===
O'Hare joined Aston Villa at the age of seven, and progressed through the development teams before signing his first professional contract with the club in 2015. He played for both Villa's U18 and U23 squads, making 33 appearances and scoring two goals prior to his first professional appearance. On 9 August 2017 O'Hare made his debut for the first team in Aston Villa's 2–1 win in the first round of the League Cup against Colchester United. His league debut came three days later as a substitute in a 0–3 loss at Cardiff City in the Championship. O'Hare made six more first team appearances for Aston Villa during the 2017–18 season.

==== Loan to Carlisle ====
On 29 January 2019, O'Hare signed on loan with League Two club Carlisle United until the end of the 2018-19 season. Upon joining the club he explained that the reason for the loan deal was to get more game time for his development, saying "I've had a good taste of football with Villa but I want to be playing game to game and showing everybody what I can do. I want to prove myself and that's why I think this is a good move for me.". He made 16 appearances for Carlisle, scoring three goals, as they finished 11th in the league.

=== Coventry City ===
On 22 August 2019, O'Hare signed with EFL League One club Coventry City on a season-long loan. He made 40 appearances and scored 4 goals for Coventry before the season was suspended due to the COVID-19 pandemic. On 9 June 2020 the League One season was officially ended and Coventry were crowned champions, securing promotion to the Championship. O'Hare returned to Aston Villa ahead of the resumption of the Premier League season. On 25 June 2020, O'Hare was released by Aston Villa.

Following his release from Villa, O'Hare signed permanently for Coventry on 15 July 2020 on a three-year deal. He scored his first Championship goal in Coventry's 3–2 victory over QPR, their first league win of the season.

Having been stretchered off just ten minutes into a 3–1 defeat to Sheffield United on 26 December 2022, it was later confirmed that O'Hare had suffered an ACL injury that would rule him out for at least nine months.

On 1 July 2024, Coventry City announced O'Hare had left the club, following his refusal to sign a new contract after his contract expired at the end of June, having made 162 league appearances, netting seventeen times.

=== Sheffield United ===
On 15 July 2024, O'Hare joined Championship club Sheffield United on a four-year deal. During the 24-25 season, he made 44 league appearances, scoring 2 goals and featured in 3 play-off matches, adding a further 2 goals. He scored in both legs of the 2025 EFL Championship play-off final against Bristol City, helping secure a 6-0, record aggregate win for Sheffield United.

=== Wrexham ===
On 1 September 2026, O'Hare joined fellow Championship club Wrexham on a three-year deal.

== International career ==
Born in England, O'Hare is of Irish descent. He has represented England at U20 level.

== Personal life ==
O'Hare's uncle is former Birmingham City and Stoke City footballer Ian Clarkson. His sister, Alliyah, is a multiple world champion Irish dancer and his older brother, Keiran, previously played for the Coventry City academy.

== Career statistics ==
As of match played 25 August 2026

Club statistics
Club	Season	League			FA Cup		League Cup		Other		Total	
Club	Season	Division	Apps	Goals	Apps	Goals	Apps	Goals	Apps	Goals	Apps	Goals
Aston Villa	2017–18	Championship	4	0	1	0	3	0	—		8	0
Aston Villa	2018–19	Championship	0	0	1	0	0	0	—		1	0
Aston Villa	Total		4	0	2	0	3	0	0	0	9	0
Carlisle United (loan)	2018–19	League Two	16	3	0	0	0	0	0	0	16	3
Coventry City (loan)	2019–20	League One	29	3	7	1	1	0	3 (Note: Appearances in EFL Trophy)	0	40	4
Coventry City	2020–21	Championship	46	3	1	0	1	0	—		48	3
Coventry City	2021–22	Championship	45	5	2	0	0	0	—		47	5
Coventry City	2022–23	Championship	11	0	0	0	0	0	—		11	0
Coventry City	2023–24	Championship	31	6	5	4	0	0	—		36	10
Coventry City	Total		133	14	8	4	1	0	0	0	142	18
Sheffield United	2024-25	Championship	44	2	0	0	0	0	3 (Note: Appearances in EFL Championship play-offs)	2	47	4
Sheffield United	2025–26	Championship	45	8	0	0	1	0	—		46	8
Sheffield United	2026–27	Championship	2	0	0	0	2	1	—		4	1
Sheffield United	Total		91	10	0	0	3	1	3	2	97	13
Career totals			276	30	17	5	8	1	6	2	307	38

== Honours ==
Aston Villa U23s

- Premier League Cup: 2017–18

Coventry City

- EFL League One: 2019–20
