= Sam McCallum =

English footballer

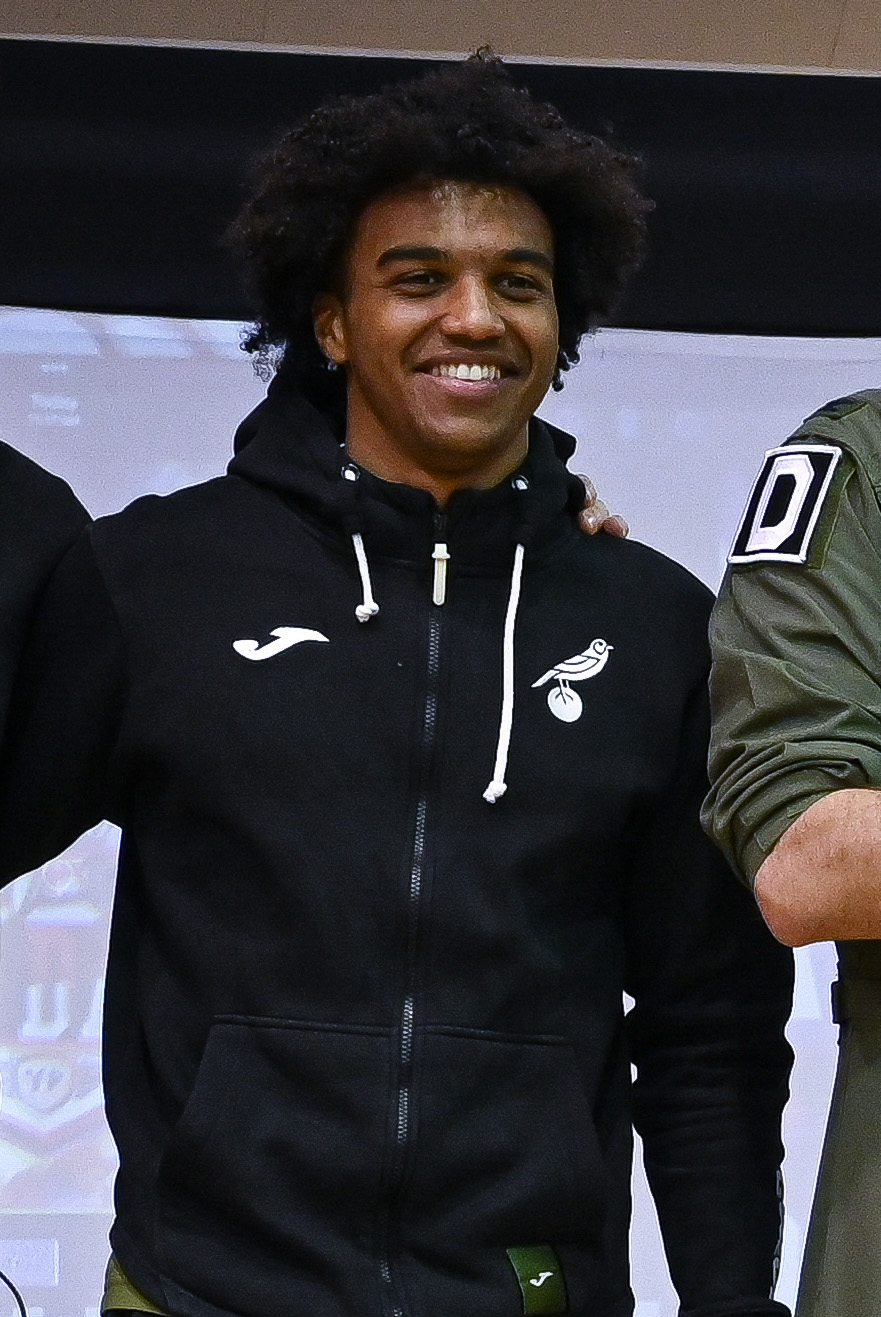
- McCallum in 2024 in Norwich

Personal information
- Full name: Sam Benjamin McCallum
- Date of birth: 2 September 2000 (age 26)
- Place of birth: Canterbury, England
- Height: 5 ft 10 in (1.77 m)
- Position: Left-back

Team information
- Current team: Sheffield United
- Number: 3

Youth career
- Gillingham
- –2017: Herne Bay

Senior career*
Years	Team	Apps	(Gls)
2017–2018	Herne Bay	6	(1)
2018–2020	Coventry City	25	(2)
2020–2024	Norwich City	50	(1)
2020	→ Coventry City (loan)	8	(0)
2020–2021	→ Coventry City (loan)	41	(1)
2021–2022	→ Queens Park Rangers (loan)	17	(2)
2024–	Sheffield United	65	(3)
- * Club domestic league appearances and goals as of 22:25, 21 November 2026 (UTC)

Sam Benjamin McCallum (born 2 September 2000) is an English professional footballer who plays as a defender for EFL Championship club Sheffield United.

== Career ==
=== Early career ===
McCallum was born in Canterbury, Kent and grew up in the nearby seaside town of Herne Bay. He attended Simon Langton Grammar School for Boys in Canterbury. McCallum started his career at non-League club Herne Bay before moving to League One club Coventry City in August 2018 after being at Jamie Vardy's V9 Academy.

In November 2018, he made his debut in an EFL Trophy defeat against Cheltenham Town coming on as an 81st minute substitute for Brandon Mason.

McCallum broke through into the Coventry first team and made a total of 35 appearances and scoring three goals.

=== Norwich City ===
On 31 January 2020, McCallum signed for Norwich City for a reported fee of £3,500,000 and was immediately loaned back to Coventry until the end of the season. Norwich signed McCallum amid interest from other Premier League teams such as Liverpool and Leicester City.

On 20 September 2020, McCallum was loaned to Coventry for the 2020–21 season for his third spell with the club.

On 12 July 2021, McCallum again returned to the Championship, joining Queens Park Rangers on loan for the duration of the 2021–22 season. He scored his first goal for QPR against Bournemouth on 14 September 2021.

=== Sheffield United ===
On the 11th of July 2024, it was announced that Sam had signed for Championship rivals and recently relegated Sheffield United.

== Career statistics ==
As of matched played 12 October 2026

Appearances and goals by club, season and competition
Club	Season	League			FA Cup		League Cup		Other		Total	
Club	Season	Division	Apps	Goals	Apps	Goals	Apps	Goals	Apps	Goals	Apps	Goals
Herne Bay	2017–18	Isthmian League South Division	6	1	0	0	—		1 (Note: Appearances in Kent Senior Cup)	0	7	1
Coventry City	2018–19	League One	7	0	0	0	0	0	1 (Note: Appearances in EFL Trophy)	0	8	0
Coventry City	2019–20	League One	18	2	5	1	2	0	2	0	27	3
Coventry City	Total		25	2	5	1	2	0	3	0	35	3
Norwich City	2019–20	Premier League	0	0	0	0	0	0	—		0	0
Norwich City	2020–21	Championship	0	0	0	0	1	0	—		1	0
Norwich City	2022–23	Championship	23	0	1	0	1	0	—		25	0
Norwich City	2023–24	Championship	27	1	2	0	3	0	2 (Note: Appearance(s) in EFL Championship play-offs)	0	34	1
Norwich City	Total		50	1	3	0	5	0	2	0	60	1
Coventry City (loan)	2019–20	League One	8	0	0	0	0	0	0	0	8	0
Coventry City (loan)	2020–21	Championship	41	1	0	0	0	0	—		41	1
Coventry City (loan)	Total		49	1	0	0	0	0	0	0	49	1
Queens Park Rangers (loan)	2021–22	Championship	17	2	0	0	2	0	—		19	2
Sheffield United	2024–25	Championship	33	2	1	0	1	0	1	0	36	2
Sheffield United	2025–26	Championship	20	1	0	0	1	0	0	0	21	1
Sheffield United	2026–27	Championship	8	0	0	0	1	0	0	0	9	0
Sheffield United	Total		61	3	1	0	3	0	1	0	66	3
Career total			208	10	9	1	12	0	7	0	236	11
