= Aaron Evans-Harriott =

English footballer (born 2002)

Personal information
- Full name: Aaron Rainford Evans-Harriott
- Date of birth: 17 September 2002 (age 24)
- Place of birth: Worcester, England
- Height: 5 ft 7 in (1.70 m)
- Position: Midfielder

Team information
- Current team: Evesham United

Youth career
- 2011–2018: Cheltenham Town

Senior career*
Years	Team	Apps	(Gls)
2018–2020	Cheltenham Town	1	(0)
2020–2022	Coventry City	0	(0)
2022–	Evesham United		
- * Club domestic league appearances and goals as of 17:57, 11 April 2020 (UTC)

Aaron Rainford Evans-Harriott (born 17 September 2002) is an English professional footballer who plays as a midfielder. Born in England, Evans-Harriott has represented Wales at youth level.

== Education ==
Evans-Harriott studied at The De Montfort School until 2019.

== Career ==
Aaron Evans-Harriott started his career at Cheltenham Town and became the youngest player to represent the club since first joining the Football League, appearing 4–3 EFL Trophy win against West Ham United Under-21s on 8 October 2019.

On 28 February 2020 Cheltenham Town agreed a transfer with Coventry City for a compensation package.

In June 2022, Evans-Harriott joined Southern League Division One side Evesham United.

== International career ==
Aaron Evans-Harriott is half-Welsh and has represented Wales at under-15 level.

== Personal life ==
Aaron Evans-Harriott grew up in Evesham with his parents and sister. He moved to Coventry in February 2020. From a young age, Evans-Harriott knew that he wanted to become a footballer.

== Career statistics ==
As of 28 February 2020

Appearances and goals by club, season and competition
Club	Season	League			FA Cup		League Cup		Other		Total	
Club	Season	Division	Apps	Goals	Apps	Goals	Apps	Goals	Apps	Goals	Apps	Goals
Cheltenham Town	2019–20	League Two	0	0	0	0	0	0	1 (Note: Appearance in the EFL Trophy)	0	1	0
Career total			0	0	0	0	0	0	1	0	1	0
