= The De Montfort School =

Location
- Four Pools Road; Evesham, Worcestershire, WR11 1DQ; England; 52°05′06″N 1°56′20″W

Information
- Type: Academy
- Motto: Achieving Together
- Established: 1 September 2014
- Local authority: Worcestershire County Council
- Trust: The Four Stones Multi Academy Trust
- Department for Education URN: 148338 Tables
- Ofsted: Reports
- Chair of Governors: Susan Fowler
- Headteacher: Anna Allen
- Deputy Headteachers: Ben Jones & Katie Green
- Staff: > 130
- Gender: Co-educational
- Age: 10 to 18
- Enrollment: 913 as of February 2026
- Capacity: 1011
- Houses: Creativity; Commitment; Ambition; Integrity
- Colours: Formerly red and black now only black
- Website: www.tdms.worcs.sch.uk

The De Montfort School (formerly known as The Federation of Evesham High School & Simon de Montfort Middle School) is a co-educational secondary school and sixth form located in Evesham, Worcestershire, England.

== History ==
The school was created by merging two Evesham schools - Simon de Montfort Middle School and Evesham High School, in 2014, when the Middle School had been taken into special measures. They had previously been run in a "hard federation", and already shared staff and the board of governors. These proposals were approved by Worcestershire County Council after a consultating with staff, parents, students, feeder schools and the Secretary of State for Education on 7 July 2014.

The previous schools, Simon de Montfort Middle School and Evesham High School had received "Good" ratings from Ofsted in March 2014 and September 2011 inspections. Evesham High School Sixth Form previously received a "Satisfactory" rating in its September 2011 Ofsted inspection report with the report specifying a "good capacity to improve". After the merger, however, GCSE results for the De Montfort School in the 2015 academic year fell well below the government standard for attainment with just 32% of students achieving the baseline 5 GCSEs at C-grade and above. The Department for Education ranks the school in the lowest 10% of schools in England at the primary level and lowest 30% at the secondary level, describing it as "well below national average".

As of September 2019, The latest DfE performance tables show The De Montfort School in Evesham now sits within the top six schools out of 30 Worcestershire high schools. The school is now well within the ‘above average’ category of all schools and is the most improved school in Worcestershire and predicted to fall within the 5% of most improved schools. It also received a positive Progress 8.

Previously a community school administered by Worcestershire County Council, in January 2021 The De Montfort School converted to academy status. The school is now sponsored by The Four Stones Gateway Multi Academy Trust.

During their recent Ofsted inspection in October 2023, TDMS was rated a Good school

== Curriculum ==
Lessons are taught in dedicated subject departments. Students in year 9 are divided into two bands by ability. They take a common curriculum consisting of English, Mathematics, Science, Art, Design, History, Geography, Philosophy and Ethics, Music, Drama, Physical Education and Personal, Social and Health Education but now can participate in either Cooking or Design and Technology. In year 10 and year 11, students follow two-year courses in English, Mathematics, Science and Physical Education, in addition to half courses in ICT and Philosophy and Ethics. Students at this level additionally choose four optional subjects from a small range including a handful of pre-vocational and GNVQ Part 1 Courses.

The school offers 9 A Level courses.

== Admissions ==
Worcestershire operates a three tier system of first (Reception to Year 5), middle (Year 6 to Year 8) and high schools (Year 9 to Year 13). The De Montfort School is an all-through school where most pupils enter the middle school at the age of ten, and have an automatic transfer to the high school at thirteen. The admissions procedure is handled by Worcestershire County Council.

The school has 3 entry points at year 6, year 9 and year 12. Entries at year 6 are predominantly from its feeder schools St. Richard's C of E First School and Bengeworth Academy, but entries from other local schools are sometimes made. Entries at year 9 are predominantly made by students who studied at the school during year 8, but a significant number are also made by students from Blackminster Middle School. Entries at year 12 normally come from the hosting school and a varied set of external institutions and from other local secondary schools.

== Notable alumni ==
=== Evesham High School ===
- Alistair McGowan, comedian
