= Matt Godden =

English footballer (born 1991)

Matthew Godden
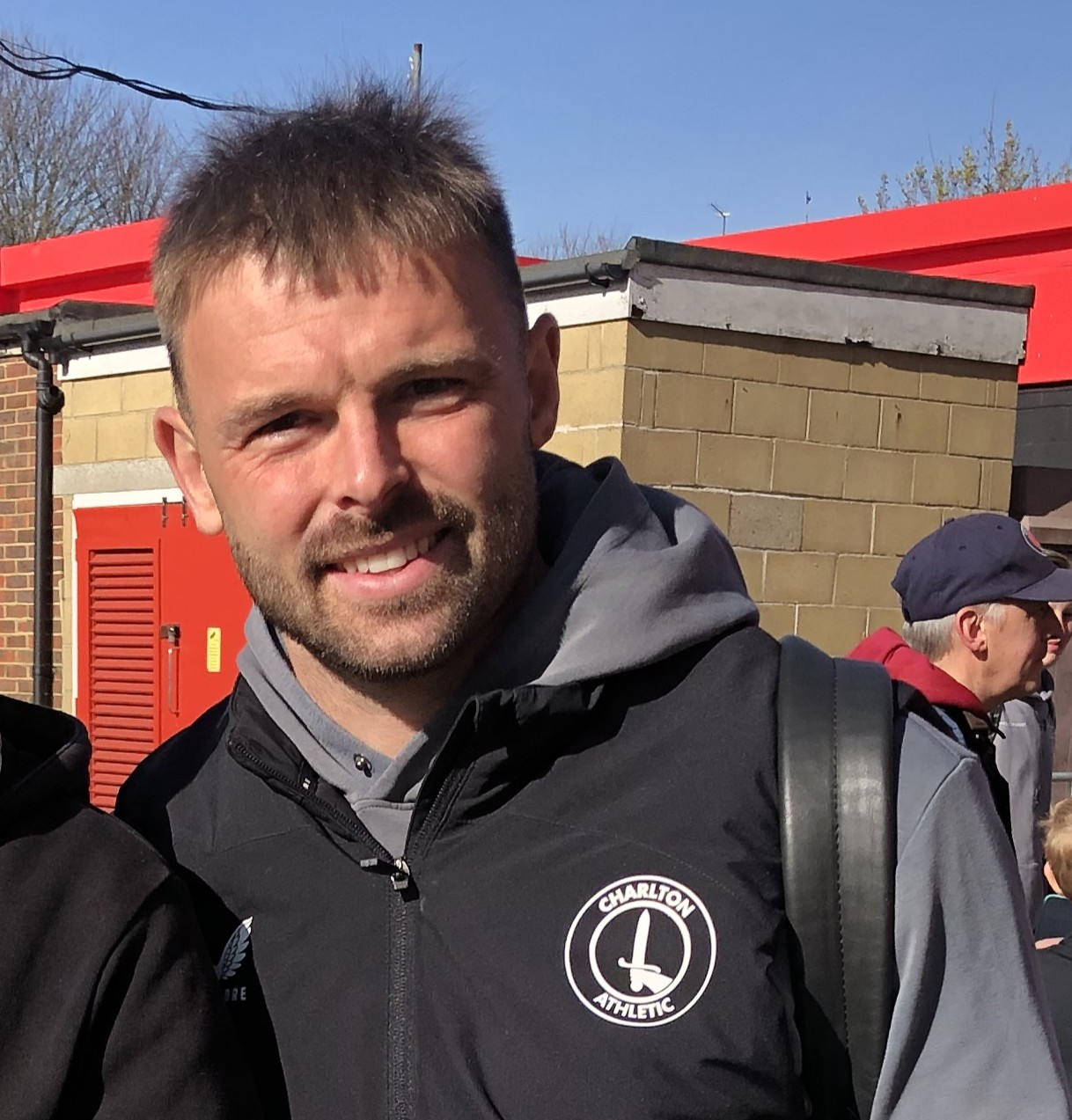
- Godden in 2025

Personal information
- Full name: Matthew James Godden
- Date of birth: 29 July 1991 (age 35)
- Place of birth: Canterbury, England
- Height: 5 ft 10 in (1.78 m)
- Position: Striker

Team information
- Current team: Charlton Athletic
- Number: 24

Youth career
- 2007–2009: Scunthorpe United

Senior career*
Years	Team	Apps	(Gls)
2009–2014	Scunthorpe United	18	(0)
2009	→ Brigg Town (loan)	20	(9)
2009–2010	→ Ilkeston Town (loan)	5	(1)
2012	→ Gainsborough Trinity (loan)	8	(2)
2012	→ Gainsborough Trinity (loan)	4	(0)
2012	→ Ebbsfleet United (loan)	4	(3)
2013	→ Ebbsfleet United (loan)	6	(2)
2013	→ Dartford (loan)	9	(5)
2014	→ Tamworth (loan)	10	(5)
2014–2016	Ebbsfleet United	70	(35)
2016–2018	Stevenage	75	(30)
2018–2019	Peterborough United	38	(14)
2019–2024	Coventry City	138	(46)
2024–	Charlton Athletic	56	(22)
- * Club domestic league appearances and goals as of 17:10, 21 November 2026 (UTC)

Matthew James Godden (born 29 July 1991) is an English professional footballer who plays as a striker for EFL Championship club Charlton Athletic.

Godden began his career with Scunthorpe United, signing professional terms in 2009. He was loaned out on eight occasions in order to gain first-team experience before joining Conference Premier club Ebbsfleet United, one of his former loan clubs, on a permanent basis in May 2014. After two seasons at Ebbsfleet, he returned to the Football League with a move to Stevenage in June 2016, spending two years there before signing for Peterborough United in June 2018.

A year later, Godden joined Coventry City, where he scored 50 goals in 156 appearances over five seasons and helped the club achieve promotion to the Championship during the 2019–20 season. He signed for Charlton Athletic in July 2024 and was the club's top goalscorer in his first season as they won promotion to the Championship via the 2025 EFL League One play-offs.

== Early life ==
Born in Canterbury, Kent, Godden attended Fulston Manor School.

== Career ==
=== Early career ===
Godden started his career at Scunthorpe United, moving from Kent at the age of 15 to take up Scunthorpe's offer of a place on the club's apprenticeship programme. He progressed through the youth system and signed his first professional contract at the end of the 2008–09 season. His youth career was disrupted by persistent injuries, and he credited Scunthorpe's management, particularly youth-team manager Tony Daws, for showing faith in offering him professional terms.

With Godden yet to make his first-team debut for Scunthorpe, he joined Northern Premier League Division One South club Brigg Town on a three-month loan at the start of the 2009–10 season, scoring nine goals in 20 appearances. He noted that the spell was valuable in developing his understanding of the more physical aspects of the game. After a brief return to Scunthorpe, he was loaned to Conference North club Ilkeston Town later in 2009, where he scored once in five appearances. Godden spent the remainder of the season with Scunthorpe's reserve team, scoring ten goals, and signed a one-year contract extension with the club on 7 June 2010.

Ahead of the 2010–11 season, Godden trained regularly with the first team and played in a number of pre-season friendlies, scoring twice in three matches. Manager Nigel Adkins stated he was pleased with Godden's development. He made his professional debut on 22 September 2010, coming on as an 81st-minute substitute in a 5–2 defeat to Premier League club Manchester United in the League Cup at Glanford Park. Godden's league debut came on 28 December 2010, appearing as a second-half substitute in a 2–0 away victory over Burnley. He made a further five substitute appearances in January 2011 and totalled seven first-team appearances during the season, before signing a contract extension to remain at the club until the summer of 2013.

=== Loan spells ===
A series of injuries sidelined Godden for the first half of the 2011–12 season. In March 2012, after over a year without playing competitive football, Godden joined Conference North club Gainsborough Trinity on a one-month loan, reuniting with manager Steve Housham, who had managed him at Brigg Town. He scored within two minutes of coming on as a substitute on his debut in a 3–2 victory over Nuneaton Town, and went on to make eight appearances, scoring twice. Godden returned to Scunthorpe on 9 April 2012, and made his first appearance for the club in a year-and-a-half as a late substitute in a 1–1 away draw with Tranmere Rovers on the final day of the season.

Godden began the 2012–13 season without making an appearance for Scunthorpe and rejoined Gainsborough Trinity on 17 August 2012 on a one-month loan, which was cut short after four matches due to a calf injury. Following his recovery, he joined Conference Premier club Ebbsfleet United on a one-month loan on 8 November 2012, returning to his home county of Kent. He scored the winning goal on his debut in a 3–2 victory over Hyde United. After the match, Godden stated the loan move was motivated by his desire for regular first-team football, adding that he hoped a good run of form would impress Scunthorpe's new management team. He scored three goals in five appearances, and although the loan was extended by a further month on 6 December 2012, he was recalled a week later. Godden returned to Ebbsfleet in March 2013 for another month, scoring twice in five appearances. Upon returning to Scunthorpe, he made his first Football League start in a 3–0 away defeat to Preston North End on 6 April 2013, the first of five consecutive starts to end the season.

Godden remained at Scunthorpe for the 2013–14 season in League Two, making substitute appearances in the first three matches before a seven-week injury curtailed his run in the first team. He joined Conference Premier club Dartford on 8 October 2013 on an initial one-month loan, highlighting the loan's importance with his contract at Scunthorpe expiring at the end of the season. He scored on his debut in a 1–1 draw with Salisbury City, and recorded a hat-trick in a 4–3 victory over Hyde on 19 October 2013. The loan was extended by a further two months, with Godden making 10 appearances and scoring five goals. After two substitute appearances for Scunthorpe in December 2013, he was loaned to Tamworth of the Conference Premier on 20 February 2014 for the remainder of the season. Godden debuted two days later, scoring a late equaliser in a 1–1 home draw with Welling United, and finished the loan with five goals in 10 appearances.

=== Ebbsfleet United ===
With Godden's contract due to expire at the end of May 2014, discussions over a new deal at Scunthorpe took place. Aware of interest from several clubs, Scunthorpe offered terms that preserved their compensation rights while remaining open to offers from other clubs. Godden signed a two-year contract with Conference South club Ebbsfleet United on 30 May 2014, having previously spent two loan spells at the club. His season began with an injury that caused him to miss the opening match, and he did not score in his first 14 league games while being deployed as a right winger, a position new to him. This ended in November 2014 when, playing as a striker, he scored a hat-trick in a 3–0 victory over Farnborough. Godden scored a 40-yard volley against Bromley on 7 March 2015, described as "a contender for goal of the season", which proved to be the match-winner in a 2–1 victory. He finished the season with 13 goals in 37 appearances, as Ebbsfleet finished ten points off the play-off places in eighth place.

Godden started the 2015–16 season by scoring once in his first six matches. Two goals a week later against Maidenhead United served as the catalyst for the most prolific goalscoring form of his career, as he scored 15 goals in 17 matches between September and December 2015. Godden finished the season by scoring 11 goals in 12 matches. This included four goals in a 5–0 victory at Hayes & Yeading on 2 April 2016, and a hat-trick in a 4–2 home win against Eastbourne Borough on 30 April 2016, which were his final goals for the club. Godden ended the season with 30 goals in 45 appearances as Ebbsfleet missed out on promotion to the National League after losing on penalties to Maidstone United in the National League South play-off final.

=== Stevenage ===
Godden's contract with Ebbsfleet expired at the end of the season, and he joined League Two club Stevenage on a free transfer, signing a one-year deal on 6 June 2016. He became Darren Sarll's first signing as Stevenage's full-time manager. Upon joining, Godden stated: "I dropped down to Ebbsfleet to rejuvenate and get regular football. The main aim was to bounce back and make a name for myself in the Football League and I thank Darren Sarll and Stevenage for this opportunity." He made his Stevenage debut on the opening day of the 2016–17 season, playing the full match in a 2–1 defeat against Crewe Alexandra at Broadhall Way. Godden scored his first goal for Stevenage in his fifth appearance, scoring the match-winner in injury-time in a 2–1 victory over Luton Town on 20 August 2016. He scored eight goals in the first half of the season, averaging a goal every three games, and signed a two-year contract extension on 1 December 2016.

Godden's first Football League hat-trick, scored in a 3–1 home victory against Newport County, marked the start of a run in which he scored 12 goals in 11 matches to begin 2017. Following two goals in a 3–0 win over Notts County on 4 March 2017, he had scored more goals than any other player across England's top four tiers in the opening months of that calendar year. He was subsequently named League Two Player of the Month for February 2017. Godden finished the season as Stevenage's top goalscorer with 21 goals in 43 matches in all competitions, as Stevenage missed out on the play-off places as a result of a tenth-place finish. Godden was named Stevenage's Player of the Year at the club's end-of-season awards ceremony. Despite interest from several League One clubs, including Charlton Athletic, Godden remained at Stevenage for the 2017–18 season, scoring 14 times in 44 appearances across all competitions. In May 2018, the club confirmed they had received multiple enquiries for Godden and indicated he would "almost certainly leave the club" during the summer.

=== Peterborough United ===
After Stevenage indicated they would consider offers for Godden, he joined League One club Peterborough United on 4 June 2018 for an undisclosed six-figure fee, signing a three-year contract. He scored within the first minute of his debut in a 2–1 win over Bristol Rovers on 4 August 2018. Godden scored 14 goals during the first half of the season, before a run of one goal in 19 matches between November 2018 and March 2019 resulted in him being used more frequently as a substitute. He finished the campaign with 18 goals in 48 appearances. At the end of the season, he expressed a desire for regular first-team football. Peterborough's director of football, Barry Fry, stated the club did not wish to sell him but had received offers from Coventry City, Milton Keynes Dons, and Portsmouth.

=== Coventry City ===
Godden joined League One club Coventry City on a three-year contract on 6 August 2019, for a fee of £750,000 payable over three years. He described the move as a "no brainer", viewing Coventry as a club that could help him achieve his ambition of regularly playing in the Championship. He made his Coventry debut in the club's 0–0 opening-day draw with Bolton Wanderers and scored his first goal in a 4–1 EFL Cup victory over Exeter City on 13 August 2019. Godden recorded consecutive hat-tricks in 4–1 away wins against Wycombe Wanderers and Tranmere Rovers. He finished the 2019–20 season as the club's top scorer with 15 goals, helping them to achieve promotion as League One champions. He was named in the PFA League One Team of the Year alongside three Coventry teammates.

Godden started the 2020–21 season with four goals in the opening month. A torn plantar fascia injury disrupted his playing time during the second half of the season, initially sidelining him for two months from January 2021. After returning for two months, he was rested for the final two weeks once Coventry had secured their Championship status. He finished the season with six goals in 24 appearances. Godden marked his return to the first team with an injury-time winner in a 2–1 victory against Reading on 21 August 2021. Following a penalty he won and converted in a 4–1 win over Fulham on 2 October 2021, he received a two-match suspension for a "clear act of simulation". He signed a two-year contract extension later that month. A calf strain prematurely ended his 2021–22 season; having scored 12 goals in 25 appearances prior to the injury.

In his fourth season at Coventry, Godden scored eight goals in 33 appearances, including three play-off matches as the club were defeated on penalties by Luton Town in the 2023 EFL Championship play-off final at Wembley Stadium on 27 May 2023. He signed a one-year contract extension on 9 August 2023 and scored nine times in 41 appearances during the 2023–24 season. Having started only six matches during the second half of that season, he informed manager Mark Robins of his desire for more regular first-team football, which the club could not guarantee. Upon his departure in July 2024, Coventry manager Mark Robins praised his character and professionalism. Godden made 156 appearances for Coventry, scoring 50 goals, which placed him 21st on the club's all-time goalscorers list.

=== Charlton Athletic ===
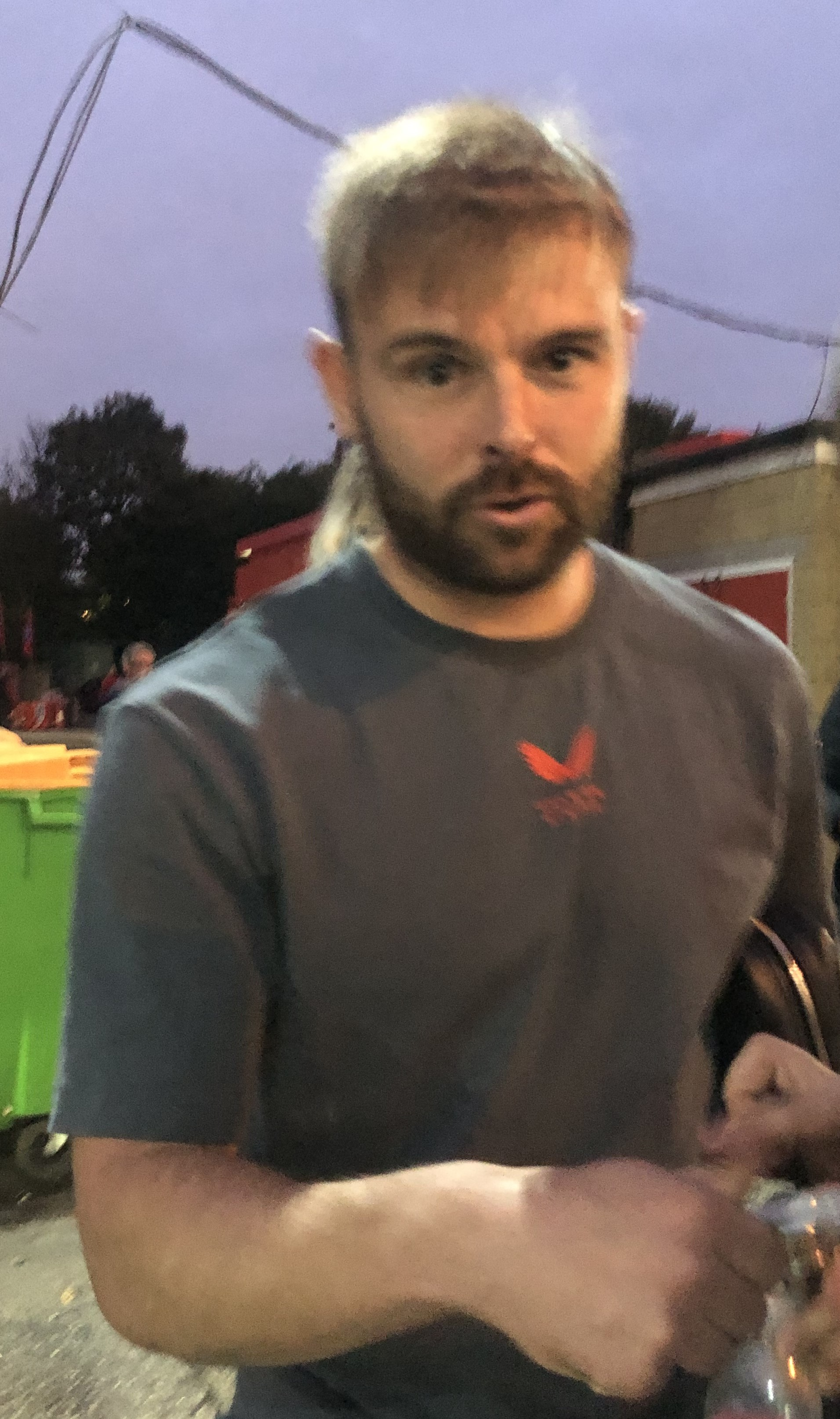
Matt Godden in 2024.

Godden signed for League One club Charlton Athletic on 3 July 2024 on a two-year contract, with the option of a further year, for an undisclosed fee. He scored his first goal for the club on 24 August 2024, coming on as a substitute to score the second in a 2–0 win over Bolton Wanderers at The Valley. Godden scored the decisive goal across both legs of the play-off semi-final against Wycombe Wanderers, securing a 1–0 aggregate victory. He finished his first season as Charlton's top goalscorer with 22 goals in 49 appearances, helping the club earn promotion to the Championship with victory over Leyton Orient in the final at Wembley Stadium on 25 May 2025.

A knee injury sidelined Godden during the first half of the 2025–26 season after he underwent two procedures, with manager Nathan Jones stating that Godden had played through pain the previous season and that his return was delayed to ensure a full recovery. He made his first appearance of the season in January 2026, but a hamstring injury the following month ruled him out until April, when he returned and scored twice in the final five matches of the season. Godden made 11 appearances during the season. He signed a new one-year contract on 22 June 2026.

== Style of play ==
Godden has predominantly been used as a striker, though he was briefly deployed as a winger at the start of the 2014–15 season with Ebbsfleet United. He has been described as a "natural finisher", noted for his composure under pressure, movement, and ability to create space in the penalty area.

== Career statistics ==
As of match played on 21 November 2026

Appearances and goals by club, season and competition
Club	Season	League			FA Cup		League Cup		Other		Total	
Club	Season	Division	Apps	Goals	Apps	Goals	Apps	Goals	Apps	Goals	Apps	Goals
Scunthorpe United	2008–09	League One	0	0	0	0	0	0	0	0	0	0
Scunthorpe United	2009–10	Championship	0	0	0	0	0	0	—		0	0
Scunthorpe United	2010–11	Championship	5	0	1	0	1	0	—		7	0
Scunthorpe United	2011–12	League One	1	0	0	0	0	0	0	0	1	0
Scunthorpe United	2012–13	League One	8	0	0	0	0	0	0	0	8	0
Scunthorpe United	2013–14	League Two	4	0	0	0	1	0	0	0	5	0
Scunthorpe United	Total		18	0	1	0	2	0	0	0	21	0
Brigg Town (loan)	2008–09	NPL Division One South	20	9	—		—		—		20	9
Ilkeston Town (loan)	2009–10	Conference North	5	1	—		—		—		5	1
Gainsborough Trinity (loan)	2011–12	Conference North	8	2	—		—		—		8	2
Gainsborough Trinity (loan)	2012–13	Conference North	4	0	—		—		—		4	0
Gainsborough Trinity (loan)	Total		12	2	0	0	0	0	0	0	12	2
Ebbsfleet United (loan)	2012–13	Conference Premier	10	5	—		—		1 (Note: Appearance(s) in FA Trophy)	0	11	5
Dartford (loan)	2013–14	Conference Premier	9	5	—		—		—		9	5
Tamworth (loan)	2013–14	Conference Premier	10	5	—		—		—		10	5
Ebbsfleet United	2014–15	Conference South	32	9	2	3	—		3	1	37	13
Ebbsfleet United	2015–16	National League South	38	26	2	1	—		5 (Note: Two appearances and three goals in FA Trophy; three appearances in 2016 National League South play-offs)	3	45	30
Ebbsfleet United	Total		70	35	4	4	0	0	8	4	82	43
Stevenage	2016–17	League Two	38	20	1	0	2	0	2 (Note: Appearance(s) in EFL Trophy)	1	43	21
Stevenage	2017–18	League Two	37	10	4	4	1	0	1	0	43	14
Stevenage	Total		75	30	5	4	3	0	3	1	86	35
Peterborough United	2018–19	League One	38	14	4	2	1	0	5	2	48	18
Coventry City	2019–20	League One	26	14	4	0	2	1	1	0	33	15
Coventry City	2020–21	Championship	23	6	0	0	1	0	—		24	6
Coventry City	2021–22	Championship	24	12	1	0	0	0	—		25	12
Coventry City	2022–23	Championship	30	8	0	0	0	0	3 (Note: Appearances in 2023 EFL Championship play-offs)	0	33	8
Coventry City	2023–24	Championship	35	6	5	2	1	1	0	0	41	9
Coventry City	Total		138	46	10	2	4	2	4	0	156	50
Charlton Athletic	2024–25	League One	41	18	3	2	0	0	5 (Note: Two appearances and one goal in EFL Trophy; three appearances and one goal in 2025 EFL League One play-offs)	2	49	22
Charlton Athletic	2025–26	Championship	11	2	0	0	0	0	—		11	2
Charlton Athletic	2026–27	Championship	4	2	0	0	1	1	—		5	3
Charlton Athletic	Total		56	22	3	2	1	1	5	2	65	27
Career total			461	174	27	14	11	3	26	9	525	200

== Honours ==
Coventry City

- EFL League One: 2019–20

Charlton Athletic

- EFL League One play-offs: 2025

Individual

- National League South Team of the Year: 2015–16
- EFL League Two Player of the Month: February 2017
- Stevenage Player of the Year: 2016–17
- PFA Team of the Year: 2019–20 League One
