= 2019–20 EFL League One =

English football season (third tier)

EFL League One
- Season: 2019–20
- Dates: 3 August 2019 – 13 July 2020
- Champions: Coventry City
- Promoted: Coventry City; Rotherham United; Wycombe Wanderers
- Relegated: Tranmere Rovers; Southend United; Bolton Wanderers; Bury (expelled)
- Matches: 400
- Goals: 1,044 (2.61 per match)
- Top goalscorer: Ivan Toney (24 goals)
- Biggest home win: Peterborough United 6–0 Rochdale (14 September 2019); Accrington Stanley 7–1 Bolton Wanderers (23 November 2019)
- Biggest away win: Lincoln City 0–6 Oxford United (21 September 2019); Southend United 1–7 Doncaster Rovers (22 October 2019)
- Highest scoring: Southend United 1–7 Doncaster Rovers (22 October 2019); Accrington Stanley 7–1 Bolton Wanderers (23 November 2019); Lincoln City 5–3 Ipswich Town (29 December 2019)
- Longest winning run: 6 matches Peterborough United
- Longest unbeaten run: 15 matches Gillingham
- Longest winless run: 12 matches Southend United
- Longest losing run: 6 matches Southend United
- Highest attendance: 33,821; Sunderland 0–0 Bolton Wanderers (26 December 2019)
- Lowest attendance: 1,880; Burton Albion 1–1 Southend United (3 December 2019)
- Total attendance: 1,809,590
- Average attendance: 8,576
- All statistics correct as of 18 January 2020.

The 2019–20 EFL League One (referred to as the Sky Bet League One for sponsorship reasons) was the 16th season of Football League One under its current title and the 28th season under its current league division format.

Newly promoted Bury were expelled from the EFL on 27 August 2019, due to financial issues at the club. They could not satisfy the requirements of their notice of withdrawal issued by the EFL for this deadline date. The league operated with 23 teams for 2019–20, with three teams being relegated to League Two for the 2020–21 season, rather than the usual four. Bury did not fulfil any of their league fixtures for the season, as they were all postponed, so no results were expunged.

Financially troubled Bolton Wanderers entered administration and had been threatened with expulsion but were saved in a buy-out on 28 August. Bolton failed to fulfil their fixture against Doncaster Rovers on 20 August. They called off the game 26 hours before kick off without informing the EFL or Doncaster, claiming concerns over younger players' welfare. On 21 November, they were issued with a five-point deduction suspended for 18 months in relation to the Doncaster postponement, as well as a postponement in the 2018–19 season against Brentford in the Championship.

Due to the COVID-19 pandemic, the season was temporarily suspended on 13 March. On 3 April 2020, this suspension was extended indefinitely.

On 9 June, clubs voted to curtail the season, meaning the final table would be calculated by a points-per-game method with the play-offs being played behind closed doors.

== Team changes ==
The following teams have changed division since the 2018–19 season.

=== To League One ===
Promoted from League Two

- Lincoln City
- Milton Keynes Dons
- Tranmere Rovers
- Bury (later expelled)

Relegated from Championship

- Rotherham United
- Bolton Wanderers
- Ipswich Town

=== From League One ===
Promoted to Championship

- Luton Town
- Barnsley
- Charlton Athletic

Relegated to League Two

- Plymouth Argyle
- Walsall
- Scunthorpe United
- Bradford City

== Stadiums ==
Locations of the 2019–20 EFL League One teams
Locations of the 2019–20 EFL League One teams

Team	Location	Stadium	Capacity
Accrington Stanley	Accrington	Crown Ground	5,057
AFC Wimbledon	London (Kingston upon Thames)	Kingsmeadow	4,850
Blackpool	Blackpool	Bloomfield Road	17,338
Bolton Wanderers	Horwich	University of Bolton Stadium	28,723
Bristol Rovers	Bristol	Memorial Stadium	12,300
Burton Albion	Burton upon Trent	Pirelli Stadium	6,912
Coventry City	Birmingham	St Andrew's	29,409
Doncaster Rovers	Doncaster	Keepmoat Stadium	15,231
Fleetwood Town	Fleetwood	Highbury Stadium	5,327
Gillingham	Gillingham	Priestfield Stadium	11,582
Ipswich Town	Ipswich	Portman Road	30,311
Lincoln City	Lincoln	Sincil Bank	10,120
Milton Keynes Dons	Milton Keynes	Stadium MK	30,500
Oxford United	Oxford	Kassam Stadium	12,500
Peterborough United	Peterborough	London Road Stadium	15,314
Portsmouth	Portsmouth	Fratton Park	19,669
Rochdale	Rochdale	Spotland Stadium	10,500
Rotherham United	Rotherham	New York Stadium	12,021
Shrewsbury Town	Shrewsbury	New Meadow	9,875
Southend United	Southend-on-Sea	Roots Hall	12,392
Sunderland	Sunderland	Stadium of Light	49,000
Tranmere Rovers	Birkenhead	Prenton Park	16,789
Wycombe Wanderers	High Wycombe	Adams Park	10,137

== Personnel and sponsoring ==
Team	Manager^{1}	Captain	Kit manufacturer	Sponsor
Accrington Stanley	(England) John Coleman	(Republic of Ireland) Seamus Conneely	Adidas	Wham
AFC Wimbledon	(Wales) Glyn Hodges	(England) Will Nightingale	Puma	Sports Interactive
Blackpool	(England) Neil Critchley	(England) Jay Spearing	Erreà	Blackpool Council (home: "VisitBlackpool.com"; away: "Get Vocal")
Bolton Wanderers	(England) Keith Hill	(England) Jason Lowe	Infinity Apparel	Home Bargains
Bristol Rovers	(England) Ben Garner	(England) Ollie Clarke	Macron	Utilita Energy
Burton Albion	(England) Jake Buxton	(England) Jake Buxton	TAG	Prestec UK Ltd
Coventry City	(England) Mark Robins	(Scotland) Liam Kelly	Hummel	Allsopp & Allsopp
Doncaster Rovers	(Jamaica) Darren Moore	(England) Ben Whiteman	Elite Pro Sports	LNER
Fleetwood Town	(England) Joey Barton	(Scotland) Paul Coutts	Hummel	BES Utilities
Gillingham	(Scotland) Steve Evans	(Germany) Max Ehmer	Macron	MEMS Power Generation
Ipswich Town	(Scotland) Paul Lambert	(England) Luke Chambers	Adidas	Magical Vegas
Lincoln City	(England) Michael Appleton	(Republic of Ireland) Lee Frecklington	Erreà	SRP Hire Solutions
Milton Keynes Dons	(Scotland) Russell Martin	(England) Dean Lewington	Erreà	Suzuki
Oxford United	(England) Karl Robinson	(England) John Mousinho	Puma	Singha Beer
Peterborough United	(Scotland) Darren Ferguson	(England) Mark Beevers	Nike	Mick George
Portsmouth	(Wales) Kenny Jackett	(England) Brett Pitman	Nike	University of Portsmouth
Rochdale	(Republic of Ireland) Brian Barry-Murphy	(Northern Ireland) Callum Camps	Erreà	Crown Oil Ltd
Rotherham United	(England) Paul Warne	(England) Richard Wood	Puma	Embark Group (Home), Mears (Away & 3rd)
Shrewsbury Town	(Wales) Sam Ricketts	(Wales) David Edwards	Admiral	Tuffins Supermarkets (Home), Shropshire Homes (Away)
Southend United	(England) Sol Campbell	(Australia) Mark Milligan	Nike	Paddy Power (unbranded) ^{2}
Sunderland	(England) Phil Parkinson	(England) Grant Leadbitter	Adidas	Children with Cancer UK
Tranmere Rovers	(Scotland) Micky Mellon	(England) Scott Davies	Puma	Essar
Wycombe Wanderers	(England) Gareth Ainsworth	(England) Matt Bloomfield	O'Neills	Cherry Red Records (Home), Dormeo (Away)

- ^{1} According to current revision of List of current Premier League and English Football League managers.
- ^{2} Southend's shirt does not display Paddy Power's logo as part of the bookmakers "Save Our Shirt" campaign.

== Managerial changes ==
Team	Outgoing manager	Manner of departure	Date of vacancy	Position in table	Incoming manager	Date of appointment
Gillingham	(England) Mark Patterson	End of caretaker spell	4 May 2019	Pre-season	(Scotland) Steve Evans	21 May 2019
Bury	(England) Ryan Lowe	Signed by Plymouth Argyle	5 June 2019	Pre-season	(England) Paul Wilkinson	2 July 2019
Doncaster Rovers	(Northern Ireland) Grant McCann	Signed by Hull City	21 June 2019	Pre-season	(Jamaica) Darren Moore	10 July 2019
Blackpool	(England) Terry McPhillips	End of contract	5 July 2019	Pre-season	(England) Simon Grayson	6 July 2019
Bolton Wanderers	(England) Phil Parkinson	Resigned	21 August 2019	23rd	(England) Keith Hill	31 August 2019
Southend United	(England) Kevin Bond	Resigned	6 September 2019	22nd	(England) Sol Campbell	22 October 2019
Lincoln City	(England) Danny Cowley	Signed by Huddersfield Town	9 September 2019	5th	(England) Michael Appleton	20 September 2019
Sunderland	(Scotland) Jack Ross	Sacked	8 October 2019	6th	(England) Phil Parkinson	17 October 2019
AFC Wimbledon	(England) Wally Downes	Mutual consent	20 October 2019	21st	(Wales) Glyn Hodges	23 October 2019
Milton Keynes Dons	(England) Paul Tisdale	Mutual consent	2 November 2019	21st	(Scotland) Russell Martin	3 November 2019
Bristol Rovers	(Republic of Ireland) Graham Coughlan	Signed by Mansfield Town	17 December 2019	4th	(England) Ben Garner	23 December 2019
Blackpool	(England) Simon Grayson	Sacked	12 February 2020	15th	(England) Neil Critchley	2 March 2020
Burton Albion	(England) Nigel Clough	Resigned	18 May 2020	12th	(England) Jake Buxton	18 May 2020

== League table ==
Pos	Team	Pld	W	D	L	GF	GA	GD	Pts	PPG	Promotion, qualification or relegation
1	Coventry City (C, P)	34	18	13	3	48	30	+18	67	1.97	Promotion to the EFL Championship
2	Rotherham United (P)	35	18	8	9	61	38	+23	62	1.77	Promotion to the EFL Championship
3	Wycombe Wanderers (O, P)	34	17	8	9	45	40	+5	59	1.74	Qualification for League One play-offs (Note: Four teams play for one spot and promotion to the EFL Championship.)
4	Oxford United	35	17	9	9	61	37	+24	60	1.71	Qualification for League One play-offs
5	Portsmouth	35	17	9	9	53	36	+17	60	1.71	Qualification for League One play-offs
6	Fleetwood Town	35	16	12	7	51	38	+13	60	1.71	Qualification for League One play-offs
7	Peterborough United	35	17	8	10	68	40	+28	59	1.69	
8	Sunderland	36	16	11	9	48	32	+16	59	1.64	
9	Doncaster Rovers	34	15	9	10	51	33	+18	54	1.59	
10	Gillingham	35	12	15	8	42	34	+8	51	1.46	
11	Ipswich Town	36	14	10	12	46	36	+10	52	1.44	
12	Burton Albion	35	12	12	11	50	50	0	48	1.37	
13	Blackpool	35	11	12	12	44	43	+1	45	1.29	
14	Bristol Rovers	35	12	9	14	38	49	−11	45	1.29	
15	Shrewsbury Town	34	10	11	13	31	42	−11	41	1.21	
16	Lincoln City	35	12	6	17	44	46	−2	42	1.20	
17	Accrington Stanley	35	10	10	15	47	53	−6	40	1.14	
18	Rochdale	34	10	6	18	39	57	−18	36	1.06	
19	Milton Keynes Dons	35	10	7	18	36	47	−11	37	1.06	
20	AFC Wimbledon	35	8	11	16	39	52	−13	35	1.00	
21	Tranmere Rovers (R)	34	8	8	18	36	60	−24	32	0.94	Relegation to EFL League Two
22	Southend United (R)	35	4	7	24	39	85	−46	19	0.54	Relegation to EFL League Two
23	Bolton Wanderers (R)	34	5	11	18	27	66	−39	14 (Note: Bolton Wanderers deducted 12 points for entering administration.)	0.41	Relegation to EFL League Two
24	Bury (E, R)	0	0	0	0	0	0	0	−12 (Note: Bury deducted 12 points for entering into an insolvency event, before later being expelled from the EFL on 27 August 2019. At the time of their expulsion, they had played no matches.)	—	Club expelled

Source: EFL Official Website
Rules for classification: 1) Points per game; 2) Goal difference; 3) Number of goals scored; 4) Head-to-head results; 5) Wins; 6) Away goals; 7) Penalty points (sec 9.5); 8) 12-point sending-off offences
(C) Champions; (E) Eliminated; (O) Play-off winners; (P) Promoted; (R) Relegated

== Play-offs ==
Semi-finals
3	Wycombe Wanderers	4	2	6
6	Fleetwood Town	1	2	3
4	Oxford United	1	1	2 (5)
5	Portsmouth	1	1	2 (4)

final
3	Wycombe Wanderers	2
4	Oxford United	1

== Results ==
Home \ Away	ACC	WIM	BLP	BOL	BRI	BRT	COV	DON	FLE	GIL	IPS	LIN	MKD	OXF	PET	POR	ROC	ROT	SHR	STD	SUN	TRA	WYC
Accrington Stanley	—	2–1	1–1	7–1		2–0				0–1	2–0	4–3	2–1	2–2	0–2	4–1	1–2	1–2	2–3	1–2	1–3	1–2	
AFC Wimbledon	1–1	—	0–0	0–0	1–3	2–2		2–1	1–2	1–0	0–0	1–1	a	1–2	1–0	1–0	3–2	1–2	1–1	1–1			0–0
Blackpool	0–1	2–0	—	2–1	2–0				3–1	2–3	2–1	2–1	0–3	2–1	4–3	1–1		1–2	0–1	2–1		1–2	1–1
Bolton Wanderers	0–0	2–2	0–0	—	1–1	3–4	0–0		2–1		0–5		1–0	0–0		0–1	1–3		1–1	3–2	1–1	2–0	0–2
Bristol Rovers	3–3	1–2	2–1	0–2	—		1–2	0–2	0–0	1–1			1–0	3–1	0–0	2–2		1–0	0–1	4–2	2–0	2–0	0–0
Burton Albion	1–1	1–0	0–0	2–2	2–0	—	0–0		1–0	0–0	0–1	0–2	1–0	2–2	1–1		3–1	0–1		1–1		4–2	
Coventry City	0–0	2–1	3–2	2–1	2–0		—	1–1	2–1	1–0	1–1	1–0	1–1			1–0	2–1	1–1		1–0	1–0	0–1	
Doncaster Rovers	1–1		0–1	2–1	2–0	2–2	0–1	—	3–2	1–1		2–1	1–1	1–0	2–0	1–2	1–1	2–1	2–0	3–1	1–2		3–1
Fleetwood Town	2–0	2–1	0–0		0–0	4–1	0–0	2–1	—	1–1	0–1		1–0	2–1	2–1	1–0	2–1		2–2		1–1	2–1	1–1
Gillingham		1–2	2–2	5–0		1–2		2–1		—	0–1	1–0	3–1	1–1	1–2	1–1	1–0	0–3	2–0	3–1	1–0		2–0
Ipswich Town	4–1	2–1	2–2		1–2	4–1	0–1	0–0	0–1	0–0	—	1–0		0–1	1–4			0–2	3–0		1–1	4–1	0–0
Lincoln City	2–0		1–0	5–1	0–1	3–2			2–0	0–0	5–3	—	1–1	0–6	2–1	0–2		0–1	0–0	4–0	2–0	1–0	
MK Dons		2–1		1–0	3–0	0–3	0–0	0–1			0–1	2–1	—	1–0	0–4	3–1	2–1	2–3	1–0	0–1	0–1	1–3	2–0
Oxford United	3–0	5–0	2–1			2–4	3–3	3–0		3–0	0–0	1–0		—	1–0		3–0	1–3	0–0	2–1	0–1	3–0	1–0
Peterborough United	4–0	3–2		1–0		1–0	2–2	0–3	1–3	0–0	2–2	2–0		4–0	—	2–0	6–0	2–1		4–0	3–0		4–0
Portsmouth		2–1		1–0		2–2	3–3		2–2	0–0	1–0	1–0	3–1	1–1	2–2	—	3–0	3–2	2–0	4–1	2–0	2–0	2–0
Rochdale	2–1		0–0	2–0	1–2		1–2	1–1	2–3	2–2	0–1	1–1	2–0			0–3	—	3–1	1–0		1–2		0–3
Rotherham United	1–0	2–2	2–1	6–1	3–0	3–2	4–0		2–2		1–0	0–2	1–1	1–2	4–0		0–1	—	0–0			1–1	0–1
Shrewsbury Town	0–2				3–4	0–0	2–1	1–0	0–3	1–1		1–1	1–1	2–3	1–0	1–0	0–0	1–2	—	4–3	1–0	2–3	
Southend United	0–1	1–4	1–3		3–1	2–3	0–2	1–7	3–3	0–1	1–3	2–1	2–2	0–4	0–2		0–3	2–2		—		0–0	
Sunderland		3–1	1–1	0–0	3–0	1–2	1–1	0–0	1–1	2–2	1–0	3–1	2–1	1–1		2–1	3–0	1–1		1–0	—	5–0	4–0
Tranmere Rovers	1–1	1–0	1–1	5–0	0–0	2–1	1–4	0–3		2–2	1–2				2–2	0–2	2–3		0–1	1–1	0–1	—	0–2
Wycombe Wanderers	1–1		2–1	2–0	3–1	2–0	1–4	1–0	0–1		1–1	3–1	3–2		3–3	1–0	2–1		1–0	4–3	1–0	3–1	—

Updated to match(es) played on 10 March 2020. Source: EFL Official Website
Legend: Blue = home team win; Yellow = draw; Red = away team win.
For upcoming matches, an "a" indicates there is an article about the rivalry between the two participants.

== Season statistics ==
=== Top scorers ===
As of 10 March 2020

Rank	Player	Club	Goals
1	(England) Ivan Toney	Peterborough United	24
2	(Ivory Coast) Armand Gnanduillet	Blackpool	15
2	(England) Ian Henderson	Rochdale	15
2	(Republic of Ireland) Paddy Madden	Fleetwood Town	15
5	(Sudan) Mohamed Eisa	Peterborough United	14
5	(England) Matt Godden	Coventry City	14
5	(England) Freddie Ladapo	Rotherham United	14
5	(England) Tyler Walker	Lincoln City	14
9	(Jamaica) Jonson Clarke-Harris	Bristol Rovers	13
9	(England) Matty Taylor	Oxford United	13
11	(England) James Henry	Oxford United	12

=== Hat-tricks ===
As of 1 January 2020

Player	For	Against	Result	Date	Ref
(Scotland) Scott Fraser	Burton Albion	Oxford United	4–2 (A)	20 August 2019	
(Scotland) Chris Maguire	Sunderland	AFC Wimbledon	3–1 (H)	24 August 2019	
(Wales) Joe Jacobson	Wycombe Wanderers	Lincoln City	3–1 (H)	7 September 2019	
(England) Ivan Toney	Peterborough United	Rochdale	6–0 (H)	14 September 2019	
(Ghana) Tariqe Fosu	Oxford United	Lincoln City	6–0 (A)	21 September 2019	
(Finland) Marcus Forss	AFC Wimbledon	Southend United	4–1 (A)	12 October 2019	
(Republic of Ireland) Paddy Madden	Fleetwood Town	Burton Albion	4–1 (H)	19 October 2019	
(England) Rushian Hepburn-Murphy	Tranmere Rovers	Milton Keynes Dons	3–1 (A)	2 November 2019	
(England) Matt Godden	Coventry City	Wycombe Wanderers	4–1 (A)	29 December 2019	
(England) Matt Godden	Coventry City	Tranmere Rovers	4–1 (A)	1 January 2020	
