= 2016–17 Professional U18 Development League =

The 2016–17 Professional U18 Development League was the fifth season of the Professional Development League system for youth football.

== League 1 ==
U18 Premier League
- Season: 2016–17
- Champions: Chelsea U18s (1st Title)
- Matches: 348
- Goals: 1,235 (3.55 per match)
- Top goalscorer: (England) Martell Taylor-Crossdale Chelsea U18s (21 Goals)
- Biggest home win: Chelsea U18s 13–0 Brighton & Hove Albion U18s (18 February 2017)
- Biggest away win: Swansea City U18s 0–7 Reading U18s (11 February 2017)
- Highest scoring: Chelsea U18s 13–0 Brighton & Hove Albion U18s (18 February 2017)
- Longest winning run: 8 Matches – Manchester City U18s (10 December 2016 – 18 February 2017)
- Longest unbeaten run: 21 Matches – Manchester City U18s (13 August 2016 – 18 February 2017)
- Longest winless run: 20 Matches – Leicester City U18s (10 September 2016 – 11 March 2017)
- Longest losing run: 6 Matches – Wolverhampton Wanderers U18s (16 November 2016 – 24 January 2017); Sunderland U18s (13 August 2016 – 23 September 2016); Swansea City U18s (28 January 2017 – 1 March 2017)

The league was split into two regional divisions, north and south. After playing each team in their own division twice, the league was split into a second league stage consisting of three further divisions. The winning team of Group A in the second league stage became the overall champion and qualified for the UEFA Youth League for the 2017–18 season.

=== First League Stage ===
==== North Division ====
Pos	Team	Pld	W	D	L	GF	GA	GD	Pts	Qualification
1	Manchester City U18s	22	17	4	1	70	22	+48	55	Group 1
2	Manchester United U18s	22	14	4	4	63	31	+32	46	Group 1
3	Liverpool U18s	22	14	4	4	50	33	+17	46	Group 1
4	Blackburn Rovers U18s	22	13	5	4	40	27	+13	44	Group 1
5	Everton U18s	22	11	6	5	49	35	+14	39	Group 2
6	Derby County U18s	22	10	2	10	38	45	−7	32	Group 2
7	Middlesbrough U18s	22	7	3	12	33	40	−7	24	Group 2
8	Stoke City U18s	22	7	2	13	34	49	−15	23	Group 2
9	Newcastle United U18s	22	6	4	12	25	43	−18	22	Group 3
10	West Bromwich Albion U18s	22	4	6	12	29	42	−13	18	Group 3
11	Sunderland U18s	22	3	4	15	23	55	−32	13	Group 3
12	Wolverhampton Wanderers U18s	22	2	4	16	30	62	−32	10	Group 3

==== South Division ====
Pos	Team	Pld	W	D	L	GF	GA	GD	Pts	Qualification
1	Chelsea U18s	22	16	4	2	68	21	+47	52	Group 1
2	Arsenal U18s	22	12	5	5	46	26	+20	41	Group 1
3	Reading U18s	22	12	3	7	51	40	+11	39	Group 1
4	West Ham United U18s	22	10	4	8	37	31	+6	34	Group 1
5	Fulham U18s	22	9	6	7	39	32	+7	33	Group 2
6	Aston Villa U18s	22	9	6	7	31	39	−8	33	Group 2
7	Tottenham Hotspur U18s	22	9	4	9	48	36	+12	31	Group 2
8	Norwich City U18s	22	9	4	9	46	38	+8	31	Group 2
9	Southampton U18s	22	7	5	10	28	41	−13	26	Group 3
10	Brighton & Hove Albion U18s	22	5	8	9	28	51	−23	23	Group 3
11	Swansea City U18s	22	2	6	14	23	60	−37	12	Group 3
12	Leicester City U18s	22	2	5	15	17	47	−30	11	Group 3

=== Second league stage ===
==== Group 1 ====
Pos	Team	Pld	W	D	L	GF	GA	GD	Pts	Qualification
1	Chelsea U18s (C)	7	6	0	1	17	7	+10	18	Qualification for 2017–18 UEFA Youth League
2	Arsenal U18s	7	4	2	1	22	13	+9	14	
3	Manchester City U18s	7	4	2	1	16	11	+5	14	
4	Manchester United U18s	7	2	2	3	16	18	−2	8	
5	Reading U18s	7	2	1	4	10	17	−7	7	
6	West Ham United U18s	7	1	3	3	8	13	−5	6	
7	Blackburn Rovers U18s	7	2	0	5	11	18	−7	6	
8	Liverpool U18s	7	1	2	4	8	11	−3	5	

(C) Champions

==== Group 2 ====
Pos	Team	Pld	W	D	L	GF	GA	GD	Pts
9	Aston Villa U18s	7	5	2	0	15	5	+10	17
10	Tottenham Hotspur U18s	7	4	2	1	21	13	+8	14
11	Norwich City U18s	7	3	2	2	15	15	0	11
12	Derby County U18s	7	2	3	2	16	13	+3	9
13	Fulham U18s	7	1	4	2	15	16	−1	7
14	Stoke City U18s	7	1	4	2	9	13	−4	7
15	Middlesbrough U18s	7	2	0	5	10	16	−6	6
16	Everton U18s	7	1	1	5	4	14	−10	4

==== Group 3 ====
Pos	Team	Pld	W	D	L	GF	GA	GD	Pts
17	Wolverhampton Wanderers U18s	7	5	1	1	12	5	+7	16
18	Swansea City U18s	7	4	1	2	11	6	+5	13
19	Newcastle United U18s	7	3	1	3	12	12	0	10
20	Sunderland U18s	7	2	3	2	5	6	−1	9
21	Leicester City U18s	7	2	3	2	10	12	−2	9
22	Brighton & Hove Albion U18s	7	2	1	4	11	10	+1	7
23	Southampton U18s	7	1	4	2	8	9	−1	7
24	West Bromwich Albion U18s	7	1	2	4	7	16	−9	5

=== Top goalscorers ===
As of 13 May 2017

Rank	Player	Club	Goals
1	(England) Martell Taylor-Crossdale	Chelsea U18s	21
2	(Scotland) Jordan Allan	Wolverhampton Wanderers U18s	16
2	(Wales) Liam Cullen	Swansea City U18s	16
2	(Scotland) Ben House	Reading U18s	16
2	(Republic of Ireland) Glen McAuley	Liverpool U18s	16
6	(England) Edward Nketiah	Arsenal U18s	15
6	(Cyprus) Jack Roles	Tottenham Hotspur U18s	15
8	(Switzerland) Lorenzo Gonzalez	Manchester City U18s	14
8	(England) Kelsey Mooney	Aston Villa U18s	14
10	(England) Cameron Cresswell	Derby County U18s	13
10	(England) Jadon Sancho	Manchester City U18s	13
10	(England) Samuel Shashoua	Tottenham Hotspur U18s	13
13	(England) Aidan Barlow	Manchester United U18s	12
13	(England) Daniel Butterworth	Blackburn Rovers U18s	12
13	(England) Angel Gomes	Manchester United U18s	12
13	(Scotland) Fraser Hornby	Everton U18s	12
13	(England) Jahmal Hector-Ingram	West Ham United U18s	12
18	(England) Phil Foden	Manchester City U18s	11
18	(England) Jordan Greenidge	Stoke City U18s	11
18	(England) Reo Griffiths	Tottenham Hotspur U18s	11
18	(England) Joe Hardy	Manchester City U18s	11
18	(England) Korrey Henry	West Ham United U18s	11

=== Hat-tricks ===
As of 13 May 2017

Player	For	Against	Result	Date	Ref.
(England) Cameron Cresswell	Derby County U18s	Manchester United U18s	4–0 (H)	13 August 2016	
(Canada) Liam Millar	Liverpool U18s	Blackburn Rovers U18s	4–0 (H)	15 August 2016	
(England) Angel Gomes	Manchester United U18s	Everton U18s	1–5 (A)	27 August 2016	
(England) Martell Taylor-Crossdale	Chelsea U18s	Norwich City U18s	5–4 (A)	10 September 2016	
(England) Jahmal Hector-Ingram	West Ham United U18s	Fulham U18s	1–5 (A)	17 September 2016	
(England) Martell Taylor-Crossdale	Chelsea U18s	Arsenal U18s	4–2 (H)	17 September 2016	
(England) Edward Nketiah	Arsenal U18s	Leicester City U18s	5–0 (H)	24 September 2016	
(Scotland) Lee Connelly	Sunderland U18s	Everton U18s	4–4 (A)	1 October 2016	
(Scotland) Fraser Hornby	Everton U18s	Stoke City U18s	2–5 (A)	15 October 2016	
(England) Korrey Henry	West Ham United U18s	Norwich City U18s	2–5 (A)	15 October 2016	
(England) Jordan Greenidge	Stoke City U18s	Newcastle United U18s	5–2 (H)	5 November 2016	
(England) Bilal Kamal	Norwich City U18s	Reading U18s	9–2 (H)	5 November 2016	
(England) Joe Hardy	Manchester City U18s	Wolverhampton Wanderers U18s	6–1 (H)	11 November 2016	
(England) Callum Gribbin	Manchester United U18s	Liverpool U18s	3–3 (A)	19 November 2016	
(Scotland) Fraser Hornby	Everton U18s	Manchester City U18s	3–3 (A)	19 November 2016	
(England) Kelsey Mooney	Aston Villa U18s	Reading U18s	1–3 (A)	19 November 2016	
(Cyprus) Jack Roles	Tottenham Hotspur U18s	Southampton U18s	2–6 (A)	26 November 2016	
(England) Anthony Spyrou	Norwich City U18s	Tottenham Hotspur U18s	3–2 (H)	3 December 2016	
(England) Jadon Sancho	Manchester City U18s	Blackburn Rovers U18s	4–1 (H)	10 December 2016	
(England) Ben House	Reading U18s	Southampton U18s	0–4 (A)	14 January 2017	
(England) Jadon Sancho	Manchester City U18s	Wolverhampton Wanderers U18s	2–5 (A)	21 January 2017	
(England) Aidan Barlow	Manchester United U18s	Newcastle United U18s	4–0 (H)	10 February 2017	
(England) Michael Fernandes	Reading U18s	Swansea City U18s	0–7 (A)	11 February 2017	
(England) Martell Taylor-Crossdale	Chelsea U18s	Brighton & Hove Albion U18s	13–0 (H)	18 February 2017	
(England) Charlie Brown^{4}	Chelsea U18s	Brighton & Hove Albion U18s	13–0 (H)	18 February 2017	
(England) Luke McCormick	Chelsea U18s	Brighton & Hove Albion U18s	13–0 (H)	18 February 2017	
(England) Reo Griffiths	Tottenham Hotspur U18s	Norwich City U18s	3–2 (H)	8 April 2017	
(England) Edward Nketiah	Arsenal U18s	Manchester City U18s	4–3 (H)	12 April 2017	
(Scotland) Charlie Gilmour	Arsenal U18s	Liverpool U18s	4–1 (H)	22 April 2017	
(England) Reiss Nelson	Arsenal U18s	Blackburn Rovers U18s	1–5 (A)	22 April 2017	

Note

(H) – Home; (A) – Away
^{4} – player scored 4 goals

== League 2 ==
U18 Professional Development League
- Season: 2016–17
- Champions: Sheffield United U18s (1st Title)
- Matches: 283 (280 RS, 3 PO)
- Goals: 1,048 (3.7 per match) (1,041 RS, 7 PO)
- Top goalscorer: (England) Jordan Ponticelli Coventry City U18s (27 Goals)
- Biggest home win: Coventry City U18s 9–0 Colchester United U18s (11 February 2017)
- Biggest away win: Barnsley U18s 0–7 Crystal Palace U18s (17 September 2016); Cardiff City U18s 0–7 Coventry City U18s (4 February 2017)
- Highest scoring: Crystal Palace U18s 5–6 Nottingham Forest U18s (15 October 2016)
- Longest winning run: 11 Matches – Coventry City U18s (3 December 2016 – 18 March 2017)
- Longest unbeaten run: 15 Matches – Sheffield United U18s (10 December 2016 – 10 May 2017)
- Longest winless run: 15 Matches – Birmingham City U18s (3 September 2016 – 7 January 2017)
- Longest losing run: 6 Matches – Bristol City U18s (5 November 2016 – 10 December 2016); Cardiff City U18s (25 February 2017 – 1 April 2017)

The Professional U18 Development League 2, also known as U18 PDL-2, was split into two regional divisions.

Teams played each team in their own division twice, and each team in the other division once, for a total of 28 games each.

At the end of the season, the teams finishing in the top two positions of both divisions met in the knockout stage to determine the overall league champion. Brentford withdrew from the competition after last year playing 4 seasons in the League.

=== Tables ===
==== North Division ====
Pos	Team	Pld	W	D	L	GF	GA	GD	Pts	Qualification
1	Sheffield United U18s	28	19	6	3	68	32	+36	63	Qualification for Knock-out stage
2	Sheffield Wednesday U18s	28	15	4	9	62	46	+16	49	Qualification for Knock-out stage
3	Nottingham Forest U18s	28	14	4	10	73	53	+20	46	
4	Bolton Wanderers U18s	28	12	8	8	57	48	+9	44	
5	Huddersfield Town U18s	28	13	3	12	60	49	+11	42	
6	Crewe Alexandra U18s	28	12	4	12	56	55	+1	40	
7	Barnsley U18s	28	9	10	9	51	58	−7	37	
8	Leeds United U18s	28	8	8	12	42	49	−7	32	
9	Birmingham City U18s	28	7	9	12	40	46	−6	30	
10	Hull City U18s	28	7	7	14	39	62	−23	28	

Source - Professional Development League North results

==== South Division ====
Pos	Team	Pld	W	D	L	GF	GA	GD	Pts	Qualification
1	Coventry City U18s	28	21	2	5	76	30	+46	65	Qualification for Knock-out stage
2	Charlton Athletic U18s	28	19	4	5	67	33	+34	61	Qualification for Knock-out stage
3	Crystal Palace U18s	28	13	4	11	59	53	+6	43	
4	Ipswich Town U18s	28	13	2	13	54	49	+5	41	
5	Millwall U18s	28	10	5	13	50	58	−8	35	
6	Watford U18s	28	9	5	14	30	40	−10	32	
7	Bristol City U18s	28	8	6	14	39	55	−16	30	
8	Cardiff City U18s	28	9	3	16	41	73	−32	30	
9	Colchester United U18s	28	6	5	17	38	69	−31	23	
10	Queens Park Rangers U18s	28	4	5	19	39	83	−44	17	

Source - Professional Development League South results

=== Knockout stage ===
Semi-finals

21 April 2017

Sheffield United U18s	2–0	Charlton Athletic U18s
Hallam 51' (pen.); Cantrill 60'	Report

Bramall Lane
Referee: Mr D.Middleton

22 April 2017
12:00

Coventry City U18s	3–1	Sheffield Wednesday U18s
Stedman 7'; Finn 16'; Ponticelli 39'		Borukov

Alan Higgs Training Centre

Final

10 May 2017
19:00 GMT

Sheffield United U18s	1–0	Coventry City U18s
Hallam 40'

Bramall Lane
Referee: Sam Mullhall

=== Top goalscorers ===
As of 10 May 2017

Rank	Player	Club	Goals
1	(England) Jordan Ponticelli	Coventry City U18s	27
2	(England) Alex Willis	Charlton Athletic U18s	21
3	(England) Cedwyn Scott	Huddersfield Town U18s	20
4	(France) Virgil Gomis	Nottingham Forest U18s	19
4	(England) Jordan Hallam	Sheffield United U18s	19
6	(Scotland) George Hirst	Sheffield Wednesday U18s	15
6	(England) Jordan Lonchar	Sheffield Wednesday U18s	15
8	(England) Francis Jno-Baptiste	Crystal Palace U18s	13
8	(England) Noel Leighton	Millwall U18s	13
8	(Romania) Dennis Politic	Bolton Wanderers U18s	13
11	(Republic of Ireland) Kyle Finn	Coventry City U18s	12
12	(England) Lewis Reilly	Crewe Alexandra U18s	11
12	(England) Dominic Tear	Huddersfield Town U18s	11
13	(England) Tyler Smith	Cardiff City U18s	10
14	(England) Aaron Cosgrave	Colchester United U18s	9
14	(Australia) Ben Folami	Ipswich Town U18s	9
14	(Scotland) Fraser Preston	Sheffield Wednesday U18s	9
14	(England) Louis Rowe	Barnsley U18s	9
14	(England) Ryan White	Bolton Wanderers U18s	9

=== Hat-tricks ===
As of 10 May 2017

Player	For	Against	Result	Date	Ref.
(England) Cedwyn Scott	Huddersfield Town U18s	Colchester United U18s	5–2 (H)	20 August 2016	
(France) Virgil Gomis	Nottingham Forest U18s	Hull City U18s	3–1 (H)	27 August 2016	
(England) Victor Fundi	Crystal Palace U18s	Cardiff City U18s	3–5 (A)	27 August 2016	
(England) Jordan Ponticelli	Coventry City U18s	Colchester United U18s	2–5 (A)	3 September 2016	
(England) Luke Whalley	Crewe Alexandra U18s	Sheffield United U18s	4–3 (H)	3 September 2016	
(France) Virgil Gomis	Nottingham Forest U18s	Watford U18s	1–4 (A)	10 September 2016	
(England) Francis Jno-Baptiste^{5}	Crystal Palace U18s	Barnsley U18s	0–7 (A)	17 September 2016	
(Scotland) George Hirst	Sheffield Wednesday U18s	Leeds United U18s	3–0 (H)	1 October 2016	
(England) Jordan Ponticelli	Coventry City U18s	Ipswich Town U18s	2–4 (A)	8 October 2016	
(England) Ahmed Salam	Hull City U18s	Queens Park Rangers U18s	3–0 (H)	22 October 2016	
(England) Cedwyn Scott	Huddersfield Town U18s	Hull City U18s	6–0 (H)	5 November 2016	
(England) Louis Rowe^{4}	Barnsley U18s	Huddersfield Town U18s	2–4 (A)	12 November 2016	
(Romania) Dennis Politic^{4}	Bolton Wanderers U18s	Crewe Alexandra U18s	2–3 (A)	12 November 2016	
(England) Ryan White	Bolton Wanderers U18s	Hull City U18s	4–1 (H)	26 November 2016	
(England) Joe Cook	Sheffield Wednesday U18s	Hull City U18s	5–2 (H)	28 January 2017	
(England) Jordan Ponticelli^{5}	Coventry City U18s	Cardiff City U18s	0–7 (H)	4 February 2017	
(England) Jordan Ponticelli	Coventry City U18s	Nottingham Forest U18s	0–3 (H)	4 March 2017	
(England) George Alexander	Millwall U18s	Crewe Alexandra U18s	5–4 (H)	8 April 2017	
(Wales) Brennan Johnson	Nottingham Forest U18s	Cardiff City U18s	4–4 (A)	8 April 2017	

Note

(H) – Home; (A) – Away
^{4} – player scored 4 goals ^{5} – player scored 5 goals

== League 3 ==
Football League Youth Alliance
- Season: 2016–17
- Champions: North-East Division; Mansfield Town U18s; North-West Division; Blackpool U18s; South-East Division; Leyton Orient U18s; South-West Division; Exeter City U18s; Merit League One; Newport County U18s; Merit League Two; AFC Bournemouth U18s
- Matches: 698
- Goals: 2,485 (3.56 per match)

League 3 is run by the Football League under the auspices of the Football League Youth Alliance. 50 teams once again competed this season. Burnley would be promoted to Category 2 Academy status after this season.

=== League stage ===
As of match played 22 April 2017

==== North-East Division ====
Pos	Team	Pld	W	D	L	GF	GA	GD	Pts
1	Mansfield Town U18s (C)	24	16	4	4	41	15	+26	52
2	Rotherham United U18s	24	15	1	8	49	25	+24	46
3	Oldham Athletic U18s	24	13	5	6	47	22	+25	44
4	York City U18s	24	12	3	9	34	40	−6	39
5	Burton Albion U18s	24	10	7	7	47	44	+3	37
6	Notts County U18s	24	11	4	9	39	36	+3	37
7	Chesterfield U18s	24	9	5	10	46	43	+3	32
8	Doncaster Rovers U18s	24	8	6	10	37	35	+2	30
9	Hartlepool United U18s	24	8	6	10	38	45	−7	30
10	Scunthorpe United U18s	24	8	5	11	37	33	+4	29
11	Grimsby Town U18s	24	7	3	14	26	51	−25	24
12	Bradford City U18s	24	6	4	14	33	53	−20	22
13	Lincoln City U18s	24	4	5	15	26	58	−32	17

Source: soccerway.com
(C) Champions

==== North-West Division ====
Pos	Team	Pld	W	D	L	GF	GA	GD	Pts
1	Blackpool U18s (C)	28	19	5	4	74	23	+51	62
2	Burnley U18s	28	18	6	4	64	35	+29	60
3	Walsall U18s	28	18	4	6	55	31	+24	58
4	Rochdale U18s	28	17	4	7	60	33	+27	55
5	Port Vale U18s	28	14	5	9	46	40	+6	47
6	Bury U18s	28	13	2	13	47	54	−7	41
7	Wigan Athletic U18s	28	10	10	8	53	41	+12	40
8	Shrewsbury Town U18s	28	10	9	9	47	50	−3	39
9	Fleetwood Town U18s	28	10	5	13	54	63	−9	35
10	Preston North End U18s	28	7	12	9	44	50	−6	33
11	Carlisle United U18s	28	9	2	17	44	56	−12	29
12	Accrington Stanley U18s	28	8	4	16	34	56	−22	28
13	Morecambe U18s	28	7	3	18	39	58	−19	24
14	Tranmere Rovers U18s	28	4	7	17	21	51	−30	19
15	Wrexham U18s	28	3	8	17	29	70	−41	17

Source: soccerway.com
(C) Champions

==== South-East Division ====
Pos	Team	Pld	W	D	L	GF	GA	GD	Pts	Qualification
1	Leyton Orient U18s (C)	22	18	2	2	59	23	+36	56	Merit League One
2	Southend United U18s	22	11	4	7	62	40	+22	37	Merit League One
3	Stevenage U18s	22	11	4	7	49	34	+15	37	Merit League One
4	Cambridge United U18s	22	9	8	5	46	30	+16	35	Merit League One
5	Luton Town U18s	22	10	4	8	48	38	+10	34	Merit League One
6	Gillingham U18s	22	10	4	8	44	51	−7	34	Merit League One
7	AFC Wimbledon U18s	22	9	5	8	40	30	+10	32	Merit League Two
8	Northampton Town U18s	22	6	6	10	49	61	−12	24	Merit League Two
9	Dagenham & Redbridge U18s	22	7	3	12	40	65	−25	24	Merit League Two
10	Barnet U18s	22	5	5	12	34	50	−16	20	Merit League Two
11	Milton Keynes Dons U18s	22	5	4	13	45	63	−18	19	Merit League Two
12	Peterborough United U18s	22	4	5	13	29	60	−31	17	Merit League Two

Source: soccerway.com
(C) Champions

==== South-West Division ====
Pos	Team	Pld	W	D	L	GF	GA	GD	Pts	Qualification
1	Exeter City U18s (C)	18	11	2	5	36	26	+10	35	Merit League One
2	Bristol Rovers U18s	18	8	4	6	42	38	+4	28	Merit League One
3	Swindon Town U18s	18	8	4	6	36	34	+2	28	Merit League One
4	Plymouth Argyle U18s	18	7	5	6	40	35	+5	26	Merit League One
5	Newport County U18s	18	7	5	6	36	33	+3	26	Merit League One
6	Portsmouth U18s	18	8	2	8	35	41	−6	26	Merit League Two
7	Oxford United U18s	18	7	4	7	40	27	+13	25	Merit League Two
8	AFC Bournemouth U18s	18	6	4	8	24	23	+1	22	Merit League Two
9	Cheltenham Town U18s	18	6	4	8	37	40	−3	22	Merit League Two
10	Yeovil Town U18s	18	4	2	12	19	48	−29	14	Merit League Two

Source: soccerway.com
(C) Champions

=== Merit League Stage ===
The teams in the Southeast and Southwest Divisions played another ten games to determine the champions of Merit League One and Merit League Two.

==== Merit League One ====
Pos	Team	Pld	W	D	L	GF	GA	GD	Pts
1	Newport County U18s (C)	10	9	1	0	22	9	+13	28
2	Swindon Town U18s	10	5	3	2	25	16	+9	18
3	Exeter City U18s	10	4	3	3	20	18	+2	15
4	Stevenage U18s	10	4	2	4	22	20	+2	14
5	Southend United U18s	10	4	2	4	19	18	+1	14
6	Luton Town U18s	10	3	4	3	17	11	+6	13
7	Leyton Orient U18s	10	3	3	4	19	24	−5	12
8	Gillingham U18s	10	3	2	5	15	19	−4	11
9	Plymouth Argyle U18s	10	3	2	5	17	23	−6	11
10	Cambridge United U18s	10	2	3	5	16	21	−5	9
11	Bristol Rovers U18s	10	2	1	7	10	23	−13	7

Source: soccerway.com
(C) Champions

==== Merit League Two ====
Pos	Team	Pld	W	D	L	GF	GA	GD	Pts
1	AFC Bournemouth U18s (C)	10	7	1	2	24	10	+14	22
2	Peterborough United U18s	10	5	5	0	17	11	+6	20
3	AFC Wimbledon U18s	10	5	4	1	16	10	+6	19
4	Northampton Town U18s	10	5	1	4	19	20	−1	16
5	Oxford United U18s	10	4	3	3	16	13	+3	15
6	Portsmouth U18s	10	3	3	4	20	17	+3	12
7	Barnet U18s	10	3	3	4	17	19	−2	12
8	Milton Keynes Dons U18s	10	4	0	6	13	21	−8	12
9	Cheltenham Town U18s	10	3	1	6	13	17	−4	10
10	Yeovil Town U18s	10	1	4	5	12	20	−8	7
11	Dagenham & Redbridge U18s	10	1	3	6	15	24	−9	6

Source: soccerway.com
(C) Champions

== See also ==
- 2016–17 Professional U23 Development League
- 2016–17 FA Youth Cup
- 2016–17 in English football
