= Dujon Sterling =

English footballer

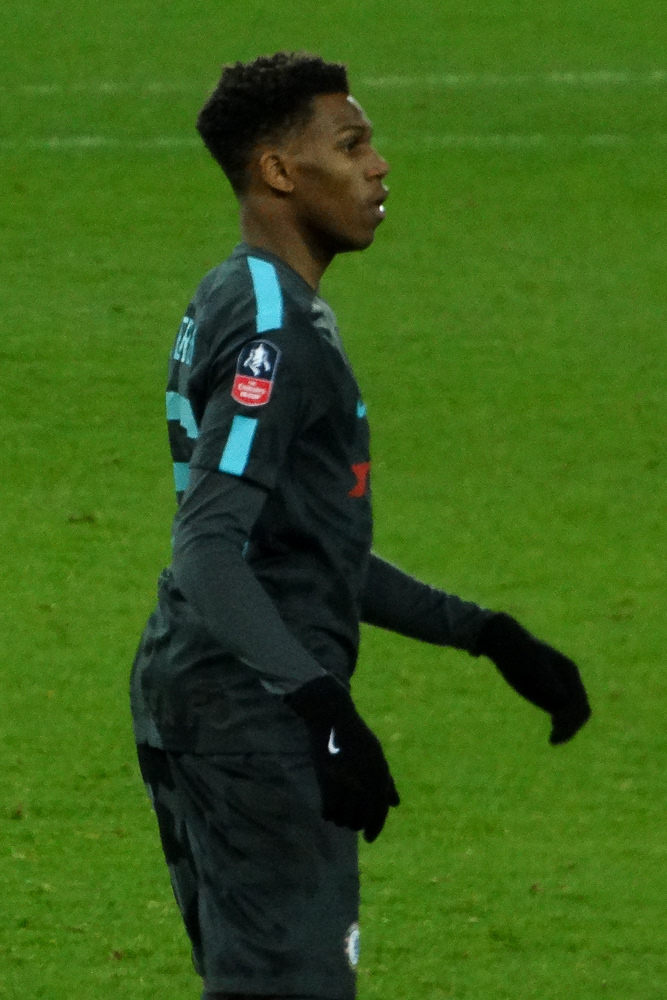
- Sterling playing for Chelsea in 2018

Personal information
- Full name: Dujon Henriques Sterling
- Date of birth: 24 October 1999 (age 27)
- Place of birth: Islington, England
- Height: 1.86 m (6 ft 1 in)
- Position: Right-back

Team information
- Current team: Rangers
- Number: 21

Youth career
- 2007–2017: Chelsea

Senior career*
Years	Team	Apps	(Gls)
2017–2023	Chelsea	0	(0)
2018–2019	→ Coventry City (loan)	41	(1)
2019–2020	→ Wigan Athletic (loan)	11	(0)
2021–2022	→ Blackpool (loan)	31	(0)
2022–2023	→ Stoke City (loan)	29	(0)
2023–	Rangers	63	(2)

International career
2014–2015	England U16	5	(0)
2015–2016	England U17	8	(0)
2016–2018	England U19	28	(2)
2019	England U20	3	(0)
- * Club domestic league appearances and goals as of 09:27, 27 September 2026 (UTC)

Dujon Henriques Sterling (born 24 October 1999) is an English professional footballer who plays as a right-back for Scottish Premiership club Rangers.

He is a product of the Chelsea Academy and started his professional career with Chelsea in 2017. During his time with the club, he had been loaned out to Coventry City, Wigan Athletic, Blackpool and Stoke City.

== Club career ==
=== Chelsea ===
Sterling joined Chelsea in 2007 at under-8 level and made his under-19 debut in a UEFA Youth League fixture against Sporting CP in December 2014. Although, recently Sterling had been deployed as a wing-back, he has also been played as a winger or centre-forward and impressed during Chelsea's 2015–16 FA Youth Cup campaign, netting in both the semi-final and final. Following an impressive campaign, Sterling was promoted to the U23 squad for the 2016–17 season as a 16-year-old and became a key figure, featuring twenty-four times and scoring four goals. In October 2016, Sterling signed his first professional contract upon his 17th birthday.

On 20 September 2017, Sterling made his Chelsea debut during their EFL Cup third round tie against Nottingham Forest, replacing Davide Zappacosta for the final 14 minutes of the 5–1 victory at Stamford Bridge.

==== Loan to Coventry City ====
On 27 June 2018, it was agreed that Sterling would join newly promoted League One side Coventry City on a season-long loan.

==== Loan to Wigan Athletic ====
On 1 August 2019, Sterling joined Championship side Wigan Athletic on a season-long loan deal.

==== Loan to Blackpool ====
On 31 August 2021, Sterling returned to the Championship with Blackpool on a season-long loan deal after he signed a two-year contract extension with Chelsea. He competed with Jordan Gabriel for the right-back berth, covered at left-back when injuries dictated, and made up part of a back three on occasion. He made 25 appearances for Blackpool in all competitions.

He damaged his ankle ligaments in a match in early April 2022 and returned to Chelsea for treatment. His loan was kept active, however. At the end of the season, he posted on Twitter (now X): "Big thanks to all the players, gaffer, coaches and staff for making my time at the club so positive." Chelsea manager Thomas Tuchel was reportedly impressed with Sterling's season, and informed him to prepare for the pre-season schedule.

==== Loan to Stoke City ====
On 1 September 2022, Sterling joined fellow Championship side Stoke City on loan for the 2022–23 season. Sterling made 28 appearances for Stoke as they finished in 16th position.

=== Rangers ===
On 30 May 2023, it was announced that Sterling had signed for Rangers permanently on a four-year deal. Sterling was praised by Rangers manager Phillipe Clement for his versatility after performing well in central midfield during an injury crisis against Real Betis in a key Europa League fixture.

Sterling won his first title in professional football when he won the 2023-24 Viaplay League Cup with Rangers, when they beat Aberdeen 1-0 in the final. Sterling was voted man of the match.

On 7 March 2024, Sterling scored his first senior goal in the 5th minute of first half stoppage time against Benfica, off a cross from Fábio Silva, to put Rangers 2-1 ahead in the first leg of the Europa League Round of 16 tie.

== International career ==
Sterling was born in England to Jamaican parents. Sterling has represented England from under-16 to under-20 level. He represented England Under-17 at the 2016 U-17 Euros and was included in the team of the tournament.

In September 2016, Sterling made his debut for the England Under-19 team in a 1–1 draw against the Netherlands. In June 2017 he was selected to represent England at the 2017 UEFA European Under-19 Championship. Despite a Sterling own goal, England defeated Portugal 2–1 in the final. He was subsequently named in the team of the tournament.

== Career statistics ==
As of match played on 20 September 2026

Appearances and goals by club, season and competition
Club	Season	League			National cup (Note: Includes FA Cup, Scottish Cup)		League cup (Note: Includes EFL Cup, Scottish League Cup)		Continental		Other		Total	
Club	Season	Division	Apps	Goals	Apps	Goals	Apps	Goals	Apps	Goals	Apps	Goals	Apps	Goals
Chelsea U23	2016–17	—			—		—		—		2 (Note: Appearances in EFL Trophy)	0	2	0
Chelsea U23	2017–18	—			—		—		—		6	0	6	0
Chelsea U23	Total		—		—		—		—		8	0	8	0
Chelsea	2017–18	Premier League	0	0	1	0	1	0	0	0	0	0	2	0
Chelsea	2018–19	Premier League	0	0	0	0	0	0	0	0	0	0	0	0
Chelsea	2019–20	Premier League	0	0	0	0	0	0	0	0	0	0	0	0
Chelsea	2020–21	Premier League	0	0	0	0	0	0	0	0	0	0	0	0
Chelsea	2021–22	Premier League	0	0	0	0	0	0	0	0	0	0	0	0
Chelsea	2022–23	Premier League	0	0	0	0	0	0	—		—		0	0
Chelsea	Total		0	0	1	0	1	0	0	0	0	0	2	0
Coventry City (loan)	2018–19	League One	38	0	0	0	1	0	—		1	0	40	0
Wigan Athletic (loan)	2019–20	Championship	8	0	1	0	1	0	—		—		10	0
Blackpool (loan)	2021–22	Championship	24	0	1	0	0	0	—		—		25	0
Stoke City (loan)	2022–23	Championship	26	0	2	0	0	0	—		—		28	0
Rangers	2023–24	Scottish Premiership	24	0	3	0	4	0	5 (Note: Two appearances in UEFA Champions League, three appearances and one goal in UEFA Europa League)	1	—		36	1
Rangers	2024–25	Scottish Premiership	20	0	0	0	4	0	10 (Note: Two appearances in UEFA Champions League, five appearances in UEFA Europa League)	0	—		34	0
Rangers	2025–26	Scottish Premiership	14	2	2	0	0	0	1 (Note: Appearance in UEFA Europa League)	0	—		17	2
Rangers	2026–27	Scottish Premiership	5	0	0	0	2	0	4 (Note: Two appearances in UEFA Europa League, two appearances in UEFA Conference League)	0	—		11	0
Rangers	Total		63	2	5	0	10	0	20	1	0	0	98	3
Career total			159	2	10	0	13	0	20	1	9	0	211	3

== Honours ==
Chelsea U23

- FA Youth Cup: 2015–16, 2016–17
- UEFA Youth League: 2014–15, 2015–16
- U18 Premier League: 2016–17

Rangers

- Scottish League Cup: 2023–24

England U19

- UEFA European Under-19 Championship: 2017

Individual

- UEFA European Under-17 Championship Team of the Tournament: 2016
- UEFA European Under-19 Championship Team of the Tournament: 2017
