= 2018–19 Coventry City F.C. season =

Coventry City
2018–19 season
- Chairman: Tim Fisher
- Manager: Mark Robins
- Stadium: Ricoh Arena
- League One: 8th
- FA Cup: First round vs Walsall
- EFL Cup: First round vs Oxford United
- EFL Trophy: Group Stage
- Top goalscorer: League: Jordy Hiwula 12; All: Jordy Hiwula 13
- Highest home attendance: 26,741 vs Gillingham (2 February 2019)
- Lowest home attendance: 9,220 vs Fleetwood Town (12 March 2019)
- Average home league attendance: 12,363
- Biggest win: 3–0 vs Walsall (16 February 2019)
- Biggest defeat: 3–0 vs Fleetwood Town (27 November 2018)
Home colours	Away colours	Third colours
- All statistics correct as of 4 May 2019.

The 2018–19 season is Coventry City's 135th season in their existence, and the club's first season back in League One following promotion from League Two at the end of the 2017–18 season. Along with competing in League One, the club will also compete in the FA Cup, EFL Cup and EFL Trophy.

The season covers the period from 1 July 2018 to 30 June 2019.

== Competitions ==
=== Preseason friendlies ===
The Sky Blues will face Sutton United, Everton U23s, Aston Villa U23s, Stevenage, Derby County and West Bromwich Albion, in memory of Cyrille Regis as part of their pre-season preparations.

7 July 2018 Friendly	Sutton United	2–0	Coventry City	Sutton
13:00 BST	Grimmer 33' (o.g.); Dundas 58'	Report		Stadium: Gander Green Lane; Attendance: 350 (Approx.)

13 July 2018 Friendly	Coventry City	3–1	Everton U23s	Cartagena, Spain
10:00 BST	Davies 13'; Clarke-Harris 18'; Andreu 65'	Report		Stadium: La Manga Golf-Norte y Sur

17 July 2018 Friendly	Aston Villa U23s	1–2	Coventry City	Bodymoor Heath
15:00 BST	? 25'	Report	Ponticelli 15'; Andreu 35'	Stadium: Bodymoor Heath Training Ground

21 July 2018 Friendly	Stevenage	2–0	Coventry City	Stevenage
14:00 BST	Ball 24'; Nugent 34'	Report		Stadium: Lamex Stadium

25 July 2018 Friendly	Coventry City	0–1	Derby County	Nuneaton
19:45 BST		Report	Johnson 31'	Stadium: Liberty Way; Attendance: 2,044

28 July 2018 Regis Shield	West Bromwich Albion	5–2	Coventry City	West Bromwich
15:00 BST	Barnes 6', 8'; Robson-Kanu 31', 39'; Livermore 51'	Report	Allassani 44'; Thompson 78'	Stadium: The Hawthorns; Attendance: 7,590

=== League One ===
==== League table ====
Pos	Team	Pld	W	D	L	GF	GA	GD	Pts	Promotion, qualification or relegation
6	Doncaster Rovers	46	20	13	13	76	58	+18	73	Qualification for League One play-offs (Note: Four teams play for one spot and promotion to the EFL Championship.)
7	Peterborough United	46	20	12	14	71	62	+9	72	
8	Coventry City	46	18	11	17	54	54	0	65	
9	Burton Albion	46	17	12	17	66	57	+9	63	
10	Blackpool	46	15	17	14	50	52	−2	62	

Source: EFL Official Website
Rules for classification: 1) Points; 2) Goal difference; 3) Number of goals scored; 4) Head-to-head results

==== Results summary ====
Overall								Home						Away					
Pld	W	D	L	GF	GA	GD	Pts	W	D	L	GF	GA	GD	W	D	L	GF	GA	GD
46	18	11	17	54	54	0	65	9	7	7	24	20	+4	9	4	10	30	34	−4

Last updated: 4 May 2019.
Source: BBC

==== Results by matchday ====
Matchday	1	2	3	4	5	6	7	8	9	10	11	12	13	14	15	16	17	18	19	20	21	22	23	24	25	26	27	28	29	30	31	32	33	34	35	36	37	38	39	40	41	42	43	44	45	46
Ground	H	A	H	A	A	H	A	H	A	H	H	A	H	A	A	H	H	A	H	A	A	H	A	H	H	A	A	H	A	H	H	A	H	A	A	H	H	A	H	A	H	A	H	A	H	A
Result	L	D	W	L	D	L	W	W	L	D	L	W	W	W	W	W	D	L	D	L	L	L	L	W	W	W	L	D	L	L	D	W	W	D	W	L	W	W	L	D	D	W	W	L	D	L
Position	18	18	13	17	16	19	12	12	13	14	14	14	12	10	8	7	7	9	6	9	11	13	14	13	9	8	8	8	9	11	11	11	9	10	8	9	9	7	9	9	9	8	8	8	8	8

Updated to match(es) played on 4 May 2019. Source: Statto.com
A = Away; H = Home; W = Win; D = Draw; L = Loss

==== Matches ====
On 21 June 2018, the League One fixtures for the forthcoming season were announced.

4 August 2018 1	Coventry City	1–2	Scunthorpe United	Coventry
15:00 BST	Andreu 52' (yellow card) 90+4'	Report	Clarke (yellow card) 23'; Perch (yellow card) 51'; Humphrys 68'; Dales 81'	Stadium: Ricoh Arena; Attendance: 12,964; Referee: Antony Coggins

11 August 2018 2	AFC Wimbledon	0–0	Coventry City	Kingston upon Thames, London
15:00 BST	Trotter (yellow card) 33'	Report	Ogogo (yellow card) 66'	Stadium: Kingsmeadow; Attendance: 4,768; Referee: Lee Swabey

18 August 2018 3	Coventry City	1–0	Plymouth Argyle	Coventry
15:00 BST	Bakayoko 43' (pen)	Report	Ness (yellow card) 44' (yellow-red card) 58'; Carey (yellow card) 44'; Taylor (yellow card) 84'	Stadium: Ricoh Arena; Attendance: 11,453; Referee: Darren Drysdale

21 August 2018 4	Blackpool	2–0	Coventry City	Blackpool
19:45 BST	Cullen (yellow card) 20' (goal) 48'; Dodoo 80'	Report		Stadium: Bloomfield Road; Attendance: 3,656; Referee: Rob Lewis

25 August 2018 5	Gillingham	1–1	Coventry City	Gillingham
15:00 BST	Zakuani (yellow card) 44'; O'Neill (yellow card) 48'; Garmston (yellow card) 67'; List 70'	Report	Clarke-Harris 46'	Stadium: Priestfield Stadium; Attendance: 4,880; Referee: Michael Salisbury

1 September 2018 6	Coventry City	0–1	Rochdale	Coventry
15:00 BST		Report	Andrew 47'; Williams (yellow card) 57'	Stadium: Ricoh Arena; Attendance: 9,879; Referee: Charles Breakspear

9 September 2018 7	Oxford United	1–2	Coventry City	Oxford
12:00 BST	Holmes (yellow card) 45+2'; Obika 86'	Report	Shipley (yellow card) 12'; Brown (yellow card) 13'; Mousinho 64' (o.g.); Chaplin 81' (pen.); Clarke-Harris (yellow card) 87'	Stadium: Kassam Stadium; Attendance: 7,519; Referee: Dean Whitestone

15 September 2018 8	Coventry City	1–0	Barnsley	Coventry
15:00 BST	Willis 80'; Thomas (yellow card) 86'	Report	Lindsay (yellow card) 73'; Dougall (yellow card) 89'; Pinillos (yellow card) 90+8'	Stadium: Ricoh Arena; Attendance: 11,465; Referee: Trevor Kettle

22 September 2018 9	Bristol Rovers	3–1	Coventry City	Horfield
15:00 BST	Reilly 7'; Lockyer 19'; Clarke 23'	Report	Hyam 44'	Stadium: Memorial Stadium; Attendance: 8,385; Referee: Thomas Bramall

29 September 2018 10	Coventry City	1–1	Sunderland	Coventry
12:30 BST	Clarke-Harris 68'	Report	Cattermole (yellow card) 30' (goal) 49'	Stadium: Ricoh Arena; Attendance: 16,407; Referee: Michael Salisbury

2 October 2018 11	Coventry City	0–1	Portsmouth	Coventry
19:45 BST	Sterling (yellow card) 19'	Report	Naylor (yellow card) 28'; Curtis 45+2'; Evans (yellow card) 47'; Thompson (yellow card) 80'	Stadium: Ricoh Arena; Attendance: 11,102; Referee: Brett Huxtable

6 October 2018 12	Charlton Athletic	1–2	Coventry City	Charlton
15:00 BST	Taylor 45+2'	Report	Kelly (yellow card) 22'; Bakayoko 81', 90+1', (yellow card) 90+2'	Stadium: The Valley; Attendance: 11,743; Referee: Ben Toner

13 October 2018 13	Coventry City	1–0	Wycombe Wanderers	Coventry
15:00 BST	Thomas (yellow card) 74'; Chaplin 82'	Report	Gape (yellow card) 68'; Williams (yellow card) 74'; Morris (yellow card) 89'	Stadium: Ricoh Arena; Attendance: 10,480; Referee: Nick Kinseley

20 October 2018 14	Southend United	1–2	Coventry City	Southend-on-Sea
15:00 BST	Coker (yellow card) 22'; Hopper 68'; Cox (yellow card) 73' (yellow-red card) 79'	Report	Doyle (yellow card) 8'; Hiwula 20'; Davies (yellow card) 56'; Jones 90+1' (yellow card) 90+3'	Stadium: Roots Hall; Attendance: 7,775; Referee: Dean Whitestone

23 October 2018 15	Bradford City	2–4	Coventry City	Bradford
19:45 BST	O'Connor (yellow card) 41' (goal) 62', 78'; Miller (yellow card) 70' (yellow-red card) 88'; McGowan (yellow card) 75'; Wright (yellow card) 89'	Report	Clarke-Harris 2'; Chaplin 11'; Hiwula 65'; Davies (yellow card) 59'; Bayliss (yellow card) 65' (goal) 70'; Kelly (yellow card) 90+3'	Stadium: Valley Parade; Attendance: 11,075; Referee: Ross Joyce

27 October 2018 16	Coventry City	2–1	Doncaster Rovers	Coventry
15:00 BST	Hiwula 21'; Thomas 41'	Report	Kane (yellow card) 14'; Wright 69'; Anderson (yellow card) 78'	Stadium: Ricoh Arena; Attendance: 11,006; Referee: Carl Boyeson

3 November 2018 17	Coventry City	1–1	Accrington Stanley	Coventry
15:00 GMT	Doyle 87'	Report	Zanzala 58'	Stadium: Ricoh Arena; Attendance: 10,653; Referee: Michael Salisbury

17 November 2018 18	Burton Albion	1–0	Coventry City	Burton upon Trent
15:00 GMT	McFadzean (yellow card) 5'; Quinn (yellow card) 45'; Willis 66' (o.g.)	Report	Doyle (yellow card) 30'; Ogogo (yellow card) 90+2'; Bakayoko (yellow card) 90+4'	Stadium: Pirelli Stadium; Attendance: 4,681; Referee: Matt Donohue

23 November 2018 19	Coventry City	1–1	Peterborough United	Coventry
19:45 GMT	Chaplin (yellow card) 43' (goal) 90+1'	Report	Tafazolli (yellow card) 34'; Woodyard (yellow card) 52'; Toney 90'	Stadium: Ricoh Arena; Attendance: 11,719; Referee: Anthony Backhouse

27 November 2018 20	Fleetwood Town	3–0	Coventry City	Fleetwood
19:45 GMT	Husband (yellow card) 38'; Marney 53'; Burns 71'; Evans 73'	Report		Stadium: Highbury Stadium; Attendance: 2,570; Referee: Martin Coy

8 December 2018 21	Walsall	2–1	Coventry City	Walsall
15:00 GMT	Osbourne (yellow card) 45+2'; Devlin (yellow card) 45+2'; Leahy 90+1', 90+4' (pen)	Report	Thomas 18' (yellow card) 45+2'; Bayliss (yellow card) 43'; Burge (yellow card) 63'; Ogogo (yellow card) 90+5'	Stadium: Bescot Stadium; Attendance: 5,926; Referee: David Coote

15 December 2018 22	Coventry City	1–2	Luton Town	Coventry
15:00 GMT	Hyam (yellow card) 88'; Clarke-Harris 90+5' (pen)	Report	Pearson 38'; Collins 57'; Mpanzu (yellow card) 63'; Shinnie (yellow card) 86'	Stadium: Ricoh Arena; Attendance: 12,559; Referee: Charles Breakspear

22 December 2018 23	Shrewsbury Town	1–0	Coventry City	Shrewsbury
15:00 GMT	Amadi-Holloway 49'; Grant (yellow card) 63'; Laurent (yellow card) 83'; Norburn (yellow card) 85'	Report	Clarke-Harris (yellow card) 86'	Stadium: New Meadow; Attendance: 8,083; Referee: Trevor Kettle

26 December 2018 24	Coventry City	2–1	Charlton Athletic	Coventry
15:00 GMT	Hiwula 41'; Mason (yellow card) 50'; Bayliss 89'	Report	Bauer (yellow card) 25'; Bielik (yellow card) 53'; Pratley 58'; Pearce (yellow card) 71'; Taylor (yellow card) 84'	Stadium: Ricoh Arena; Attendance: 13,013; Referee: Simon Hooper

29 December 2018 25	Coventry City	1–0	Southend United	Coventry
15:00 GMT	Hiwula 54'; Chaplin (yellow card) 90+9'	Report	Kightly (yellow card) 48'; Dieng (yellow card) 50'; McLaughlin (yellow card) 90+8'	Stadium: Ricoh Arena; Attendance: 11,395; Referee: Kevin Johnson

1 January 2019 26	Wycombe Wanderers	0–2	Coventry City	High Wycombe
15:00 GMT	Thompson (yellow card) 27'; Jombati (yellow card) 90+3'	Report	Chaplin 34' (pen); Clarke-Harris 62'	Stadium: Adams Park; Attendance: 6,183; Referee: Lee Collins

5 January 2019 27	Scunthorpe United	2–1	Coventry City	Scunthorpe
15:00 GMT	Perch 67'; Sutton 74' (yellow card) 81'	Report	Chaplin 78'; Bayliss (yellow card) 82'	Stadium: Glanford Park; Attendance: 4,692; Referee: Eddie Ilderton

12 January 2019 28	Coventry City	1–1	AFC Wimbledon	Coventry
15:00 GMT	Thomas 61'; Chaplin (yellow card) 75'	Report	Jervis 2'; Wordsworth (yellow card) 78'	Stadium: Ricoh Arena; Attendance: 10,420; Referee: Robert Lewis

19 January 2019 29	Plymouth Argyle	2–1	Coventry City	Plymouth
15:00 GMT	Sarcevic (yellow card) 35'; Songo'o (yellow card) 47'; Smith Brown (yellow card) 54'; Lameiras 63', 70'	Report	Mason (yellow card) 43'; Chaplin 55'	Stadium: Home Park; Attendance: 10,686; Referee: Trevor Kettle

26 January 2019 30	Coventry City	0–2	Blackpool	Coventry
15:00 GMT		Report	Delfouneso 47' (yellow card) 70'; Gnanduillet 52'	Stadium: Ricoh Arena; Attendance: 9,786; Referee: Eddie Ilderton

2 February 2019 31	Coventry City	1–1	Gillingham	Coventry
15:00 GMT	Enobakhare 68'; Burge (yellow card) 89'	Report	Byrne (yellow card) 57'; Eaves 90+2' (pen)	Stadium: Ricoh Arena; Attendance: 26,741; Referee: Kevin Johnson

9 February 2019 32	Rochdale	0–1	Coventry City	Rochdale
15:00 GMT	Ebanks-Landell (yellow card) 38'; Dooley (yellow card) 73'; Hamilton (yellow card) 76'	Report	Hiwula 68'; Thomas (yellow card) 90+3'	Stadium: Spotland Stadium; Attendance: 3,661; Referee: Paul Marsden

16 February 2019 33	Coventry City	3–0	Walsall	Coventry
15:00 GMT	Bakayoko 29'; Hiwula 36'; Enobakhare (yellow card) 36', (goal) 73' (pen)	Report		Stadium: Ricoh Arena; Attendance: 10,646; Referee: Anthony Backhouse

24 February 2019 34	Luton Town	1–1	Coventry City	Luton
12:00 GMT	Pearson 16'; Mpanzu (yellow card) 29'; LuaLua (yellow card) 84'	Report	Shipley 34', (yellow card) 90+3'; Bayliss (yellow card) 43'; Thomas (yellow card) 58'	Stadium: Kenilworth Road; Attendance: 9,810; Referee: Ross Joyce

2 March 2019 35	Accrington Stanley	0–1	Coventry City	Accrington
15:00 GMT	Gibson (yellow card) 73'; Johnson (yellow card) 81'	Report	Enobakhare 60'	Stadium: Crown Ground; Attendance: 3,083; Referee: Peter Wright

8 March 2019 36	Coventry City	1–2	Burton Albion	Coventry
19:45 GMT	Enobakhare (yellow card) 36' (yellow-red card) 55'; Bayliss 51'; Sterling (yellow card) 69'; Davies (yellow card) 80'	Report	Akins 19'; Fraser (yellow card) 45+2'; Allen 60'; Harness (yellow card) 83'; Quinn (yellow card) 87'	Stadium: Ricoh Arena; Attendance: 11,468; Referee: Neil Hair

12 March 2019 37	Coventry City	2–1	Fleetwood Town	Coventry
19:45 GMT	Bakayoko 6'; Bayliss (yellow card) 12'; Hiwula 42'; Williams (yellow card) 79'	Report	Nadesan (yellow card) 28'; Evans 33'	Stadium: Ricoh Arena; Attendance: 9,220; Referee: Carl Boyeson

16 March 2019 38	Peterborough United	1–2	Coventry City	Peterborough
15:00 GMT	O'Malley (yellow card) 52'; Naismith (yellow card) 62'; Tomlin (yellow card) 90+4'; Reed 90+8'	Report	Bakayoko 42'; Enobakhare 49'	Stadium: London Road Stadium; Attendance: 7,084; Referee: Michael Salisbury

23 March 2019 39	Coventry City	0–1	Oxford United	Coventry
15:00 GMT	Hiwula (yellow card) 41'	Report	Browne (yellow card) 45'; Graham (yellow card) 45+2'; Nelson 57'; Garbutt (yellow card) 75'	Stadium: Ricoh Arena; Attendance: 14,044; Referee: Scott Oldham

30 March 2019 40	Barnsley	2–2	Coventry City	Barnsley
15:00 GMT	Mowatt 9'; McGeehan (yellow card) 45+1'; Woodrow 48'; Williams (yellow card) 82'; Bähre (yellow card) 90+6'	Report	Hiwula 35'; Thomas 62' (yellow card) 63'	Stadium: Oakwell; Attendance: 13,593; Referee: Steve Martin

7 April 2019 41	Coventry City	0–0	Bristol Rovers	Coventry
15:00 GMT	Bakayoko (yellow card) 44'	Report	Clarke-Harris (yellow card) 38'	Stadium: Ricoh Arena; Attendance: 12,664; Referee: Anthony Backhouse

13 April 2019 42	Sunderland	4–5	Coventry City	Sunderland
15:00 GMT	Honeyman 15'; Wyke 41'; Leadbitter (yellow card) 44'; Grigg 45+4'; Power 69'	Report	Enobakhare 12'; Bakayoko 18'; Hiwula 25'; Sterling (yellow card) 42'; Shipley 55'; Chaplin 78' (yellow card) 79'	Stadium: Stadium of Light; Attendance: 36,134; Referee: John Busby

19 April 2019 43	Coventry City	2–0	Bradford City	Coventry
13:00 GMT	Hiwula 9'; Kelly (yellow card) 21'; Sterling (yellow card) 29'; Enobakhare 88'	Report	Knight-Percival (yellow card) 34' (yellow-red card) 44'; O'Brien (yellow card) 84'	Stadium: Ricoh Arena; Attendance: 11,711; Referee: Lee Swabey

22 April 2019 44	Portsmouth	2–1	Coventry City	Portsmouth
12:30 BST	Naylor 66'; Pitman 83'	Report	Hiwula 9'; Burge (yellow card) 57'	Stadium: Fratton Park; Attendance: 18,884; Referee: Darren Drysdale

28 April 2019 45	Coventry City	1–1	Shrewsbury Town	Coventry
15:00 BST	Shipley 16'	Report	Grant (yellow card) 29'; Okenabirhie 78'	Stadium: Ricoh Arena; Attendance: 13,549; Referee: Alan Young

4 May 2019 46	Doncaster Rovers	2–0	Coventry City	Doncaster
17:30 GMT	Sadlier (yellow card) 20' (goal) 31'; Wilks (yellow card) 56'; Rowe (yellow card) 84'; Marquis 85'	Report	Thomas (yellow card) 36'	Stadium: Keepmoat Stadium; Attendance: 12,794; Referee: Jeremy Simpson

=== FA Cup ===
The first round draw was made live on BBC by former Coventry players Dennis Wise and Dion Dublin on 22 October.

10 November 2018 First round	Walsall	3–2	Coventry City	Walsall
15:00 BST	Cook 12' (yellow card) 87'; Ginnelly 28'; Martin (yellow card) 76'; Devlin 77'	Report	Clarke-Harris 33'; Thomas 56' (yellow card) 57'; Shipley (yellow card) 62'; Mason (yellow card) 75'	Stadium: Bescot Stadium; Attendance: 4,760; Referee: Thomas Bramall

=== EFL Cup ===
On 15 June 2018, the draw for the first round was made in Vietnam.

14 August 2018 First round	Oxford United	2–0	Coventry City	Oxford
19:45 BST	Browne 39'; Whyte 50'	Report		Stadium: Kassam Stadium; Attendance: 3,551; Referee: James Linington

=== EFL Trophy ===
On 13 July 2018, the initial group stage draw bar the U21 invited clubs was announced.

Pos	Lge	Team	Pld	W	PW	PL	L	GF	GA	GD	Pts	Qualification
1	L2	Cheltenham Town	3	2	0	0	1	8	6	+2	6	Round 2
2	ACA	Arsenal U21	3	2	0	0	1	8	7	+1	6	Round 2
3	L2	Forest Green Rovers	3	1	0	1	1	6	4	+2	4	
4	L1	Coventry City	3	0	1	0	2	1	6	−5	2	

Source: EFL.com

12 September 2018 Group Stage	Coventry City	0–3	Arsenal U21s	Coventry
19:45 BST		Report	Smith Rowe 4'; Nketiah 77'; Willock 90'	Stadium: Ricoh Arena; Attendance: 2,375

9 October 2018 Group Stage	Coventry City	1–1 (4–2 p)	Forest Green Rovers	Coventry
19:45 BST	Hiwula 3'	Report	Pearce 68'	Stadium: Ricoh Arena; Attendance: 1,341
	Penalties
	4		2

13 November 2018 Group stages	Cheltenham Town	2–0	Coventry City	Cheltenham
19:45 GMT	Maddox 33'; Boyle 48'	Report		Stadium: Whaddon Road; Attendance: 1,296

== Squad information ==
=== Squad details ===
No.	Name	Position	Nationality	Place of birth	Date of birth (age) *	Club apps *	Club goals *	Signed from	Date signed	Fee	Contract end
Goalkeepers
1	Lee Burge	GK	(England)	Hereford	9 January 1993 (aged 25)	119	0	Academy	1 June 2010	Trainee	30 June 2019
13	Liam O'Brien	GK	(England)	Ruislip	30 November 1991 (aged 26)	11	0	Portsmouth	1 July 2017	Free	30 June 2019
33	Corey Addai	GK	(England)	Hackney	10 October 1997 (aged 20)	0	0	Academy	1 June 2014	Trainee	30 June 2019
Defenders
2	Jack Grimmer	RB	(Scotland)	Aberdeen	25 January 1994 (aged 24)	53	3	Fulham	5 July 2017	Free	30 June 2019
3	Brandon Mason	LB	(England)	Westminster	30 September 1997 (aged 20)	0	0	Watford	6 July 2018	Free	30 June 2020
4	Jordan Willis	CB	(England)	Coventry	24 August 1994 (aged 23)	169	7	Academy	1 June 2011	Trainee	30 June 2019
5	Tom Davies	CB	(England)	Warrington	18 April 1992 (aged 26)	25	0	Portsmouth	31 August 2017	Undisclosed	30 June 2019
12	Junior Brown	LB	(England)	Crewe	7 May 1989 (aged 29)	0	0	Shrewsbury Town	1 July 2018	Free	30 June 2020
15	Dominic Hyam	CB	(Scotland) (England)	Leuchars	20 December 1995 (aged 22)	22	0	Reading	1 July 2017	Free	30 June 2020
17	Dujon Sterling	RB	(England)	Islington	24 October 1999 (aged 18)	0	0	Chelsea	1 July 2018	Loan	30 June 2019
27	Jordon Thompson	DF	(England)	Coventry	8 April 1999 (aged 19)	1	0	Academy	1 July 2016	Trainee	30 June 2021
34	Chris Camwell	LB	(England)	Nuneaton	27 October 1998 (aged 19)	2	0	Academy	1 July 2016	Trainee	30 June 2021
36	Reece Ford	DF	(Republic of Ireland)	Coventry	28 October 1998 (aged 19)	0	0	Academy	1 July 2016	Trainee	30 June 2020
37	Morgan Williams	CB	(England)	Derby	3 August 1998 (aged 19)	0	0	Mickleover Sports	2 July 2018	Undisclosed	30 June 2020
39	Lewis Green	DF	(England)			0	0	Academy	14 August 2016	Trainee	30 June 2019
41	Sam McCallum	LB	(England)	Canterbury	28 October 1998 (aged 19)	0	0	V9 Academy	9 August 2018	Free	30 June 2022
	Declan Drysdale	CB	(England)	Birkenhead	14 November 1999 (aged 18)	0	0	Tranmere Rovers	4 January 2019	Compensation	30 June 2021
Midfielders
6	Liam Kelly	DM	(Scotland) (England)	Milton Keynes	10 February 1990 (aged 28)	38	1	Leyton Orient	1 July 2017	Free	30 June 2021
7	Jodi Jones	RW	(England)	Bow	22 October 1997 (aged 20)	73	7	Dagenham & Redbridge	10 May 2016	Undisclosed	30 June 2020
8	David Meyler	CM	(Republic of Ireland)	Cork	29 May 1989 (aged 29)	0	0	Reading	31 January 2019	Loan	30 June 2019
20	Tom Bayliss	CM	(England)	Leicester	6 April 1999 (aged 19)	32	6	Academy	1 July 2016	Trainee	30 June 2022
22	Tony Andreu	AM	(France)	Cagnes-sur-Mer	22 May 1988 (aged 30)	6	1	Norwich City	10 Aug 2017	Free	30 June 2019
23	Luke Thomas	RW	(England)	Soudley	19 February 1999 (aged 19)	0	0	Derby County	16 August 2018	Loan	30 June 2019
25	Zain Westbrooke	CM	(England)	Chertsey	28 October 1996 (aged 21)	0	0	Brentford	10 May 2018	Free	30 June 2020
26	Jordan Shipley	CM	(England) (Republic of Ireland)	Coventry	26 September 1997 (aged 20)	42	6	Academy	1 July 2016	Trainee	30 June 2020
28	Callum Maycock	CM	(England)	Birmingham	23 December 1997 (aged 20)	12	0	Academy	1 July 2016	Trainee	30 June 2020
29	Jak Hickman	MF	(England)	Sandwell	11 September 1998 (aged 19)	0	0	Academy	1 July 2016	Trainee	30 June 2021
30	Bouwe Bosma	DM	(England)	Liverpool	24 May 1996 (aged 22)	0	0	Lewes	1 July 2018	Undisclosed	30 June 2020
32	Dexter Walters	LW	(England)	Birmingham	4 December 1998 (aged 19)	0	0	Tamworth	3 August 2018	Undisclosed	30 June 2020
38	Josh Eccles	MF	(England)	Coventry	6 April 2000 (aged 18)	0	0	Academy	14 August 2016	Trainee	30 June 2021
40	Billy Stedman	MF	(England)	Swindon	3 November 1999 (aged 18)	0	0	Academy	14 August 2016	Trainee	30 June 2019
44	Charlie Wakefield	RW	(England)	Worthing	9 April 1998 (aged 20)	0	0	Chelsea	31 January 2019	Free	30 June 2020
50	Jack Burroughs	MF	(Scotland) (England)	Coventry	21 March 2001 (aged 17)	0	0	Academy	7 August 2017	Trainee	30 June 2019
Forwards
9	Maxime Biamou	CF	(France)	Créteil	13 November 1990 (aged 27)	49	9	Sutton United	1 July 2017	Undisclosed	30 June 2021
10	Conor Chaplin	FW	(England)	Worthing	16 February 1997 (aged 21)	0	0	Portsmouth	30 August 2018	Free	30 June 2021
11	Jordy Hiwula	FW	(England)	Manchester	21 September 1994 (aged 23)	0	0	Huddersfield Town	2 August 2018	Undisclosed	30 June 2020
14	Reise Allassani	FW	(England)	London	3 January 1996 (aged 22)	0	0	Dulwich Hamlet	1 July 2018	Undisclosed	30 June 2020
19	Jordan Ponticelli	CF	(England)	Coventry	10 September 1998 (aged 19)	26	6	Strachan Football Foundation	26 July 2016	Free	30 June 2022
21	Amadou Bakayoko	CF	(Sierra Leone) (England)	Freetown	1 January 1996 (aged 22)	0	0	Walsall	7 August 2018	Undisclosed	30 June 2020
24	Bright Enobakhare	FW	(Nigeria)	Benin City	8 February 1998 (aged 20)	0	0	Wolverhampton Wanderers	8 January 2019	Loan	30 June 2019
43	David Bremang	CF	(England)	Hammersmith	21 January 2000 (aged 18)	0	0	Conquest Academy	11 September 2018	Free	30 June 2020
46	Jonny Ngandu	FW	(England)	Redbridge	25 October 2001 (aged 16)	0	0	Academy	7 August 2017	Trainee	30 June 2019
	Stuart Beavon	CF	(England)	Reading	5 May 1984 (aged 34)	35	3	Burton Albion	1 January 2017	Free	30 June 2019
Left before the end of the season
8	Michael Doyle	CM	(Republic of Ireland)	Dublin	8 August 1981 (aged 36)	356	28	Portsmouth	1 July 2017	Free	30 June 2019
16	Abu Ogogo	CM	(England)	Epsom	3 November 1989 (aged 28)	0	0	Shrewsbury Town	1 July 2018	Free	30 June 2021
18	Jonson Clarke-Harris	CF	(England) (Jamaica)	Leicester	20 July 1994 (aged 23)	22	4	Rotherham United	1 July 2018	Free	30 June 2020
31	David Stockdale	GK	(England)	Leeds	20 September 1985 (aged 32)	0	0	Birmingham City	8 February 2019	Loan	22 February 2019
31	Peter Vincenti	RM	(Jersey)	Saint Peter	7 July 1986 (aged 31)	29	3	Rochdale	1 July 2017	Free	30 June 2019
35	Kyle Finn	LM	(England)	Warwick	7 December 1998 (aged 19)	1	0	Academy	1 July 2016	Trainee	30 June 2020

* Player age and appearances/goals for the club as of beginning of 2018–19 season.

=== Appearances ===
Correct as of match played on 4 May 2019

No.	Nat.	Player	Pos.	League One	FA Cup	EFL Cup	EFL Trophy	Total
1	(England)	Lee Burge	GK	40	1			41
2	(Scotland)	Jack Grimmer	DF	8+3		1	1	13
3	(England)	Brandon Mason	DF	25	1		2	28
4	(England)	Jordan Willis	DF	36+2	1			39
5	(England)	Tom Davies	DF	19+4		1	1	25
6	(Scotland)	Liam Kelly	MF	25+5			2	32
7	(England)	Jodi Jones	MF	0+8	0+1		1	10
8	(Republic of Ireland)	David Meyler	MF	2+3				5
9	(France)	Maxime Biamou	FW	2+2		1		5
10	(England)	Conor Chaplin	FW	22+9	0+1			32
11	(England)	Jordy Hiwula	FW	35+4	1	1	2	43
12	(England)	Junior Brown	DF	17+5		1		23
13	(England)	Liam O'Brien	GK	4		1	3	8
14	(England)	Reise Allassani	FW	0+5			1	6
15	(Scotland)	Dominic Hyam	DF	37+1	1	1	1	41
17	(England)	Dujon Sterling	DF	37+1		1	1	40
19	(England)	Jordan Ponticelli	FW	0+5		0+1		6
20	(England)	Tom Bayliss	MF	37+1	0+1	1	1	41
21	(Sierra Leone)	Amadou Bakayoko	FW	18+13		1	3	35
22	(France)	Tony Andreu	MF	6+4			2	12
23	(England)	Luke Thomas	MF	41+2	1			44
24	(Nigeria)	Bright Enobakhare	FW	18				18
25	(England)	Zain Westbrooke	MF	3+4			0+1	8
26	(England)	Jordan Shipley	MF	22+11	1	0+1	1	36
27	(England)	Jordon Thompson	DF	1+3	1		3	8
28	(England)	Callum Maycock	MF					
29	(England)	Jak Hickman	MF				1+1	2
30	(England)	Bouwe Bosma	MF					
32	(England)	Dexter Walters	MF				0+1	1
33	(England)	Corey Addai	GK					
34	(England)	Chris Camwell	DF				1+1	2
36	(Republic of Ireland)	Reece Ford	DF					
37	(England)	Morgan Williams	DF	1			2+1	4
38	(England)	Josh Eccles	MF				1	1
39	(England)	Lewis Green	DF					
40	(England)	Billy Stedman	MF				0+1	1
41	(England)	Sam McCallum	DF	3+4			0+1	8
43	(England)	David Bremang	FW					
44	(England)	Charlie Wakefield	MF	0+8				8
46	(England)	Jonny Ngandu	FW				1	1
50	(Scotland)	Jack Burroughs	MF				0+2	2
	(England)	Stuart Beavon	FW					
	(England)	Declan Drysdale	DF					
Left before the end of the season
8	(Republic of Ireland)	Michael Doyle	MF	21+2	1			24
16	(England)	Abu Ogogo	MF	7+4	1	1	2	15
18	(England)	Jonson Clarke-Harris	FW	18+9	1	0+1		29
31	(England)	David Stockdale	GK	2				2
31	(Jersey)	Peter Vincenti	MF					
35	(England)	Kyle Finn	MF					

=== Goalscorers ===
Correct as of match played on 4 May 2019

No.	Nat.	Player	Pos.	League One	FA Cup	EFL Cup	EFL Trophy	Total
11	(England)	Jordy Hiwula	FW	12	0	0	1	13
10	(England)	Conor Chaplin	FW	8	0	0	0	8
21	(Sierra Leone)	Amadou Bakayoko	FW	7	0	0	0	7
18	(England)	Jonson Clarke-Harris	FW	5	1	0	0	6
24	(Nigeria)	Bright Enobakhare	FW	6	0	0	0	6
23	(England)	Luke Thomas	MF	4	1	0	0	5
20	(England)	Tom Bayliss	MF	3	0	0	0	3
26	(England)	Jordan Shipley	MF	3	0	0	0	3
4	(England)	Jordan Willis	DF	1	0	0	0	1
7	(England)	Jodi Jones	MF	1	0	0	0	1
8	(Republic of Ireland)	Michael Doyle	MF	1	0	0	0	1
15	(Scotland)	Dominic Hyam	DF	1	0	0	0	1
22	(France)	Tony Andreu	MF	1	0	0	0	1
Own Goals				1	0	0	0	1
Totals				54	2	0	1	57

=== Assists ===
Correct as of match played on 4 May 2019

No.	Nat.	Player	Pos.	League One	FA Cup	EFL Cup	EFL Trophy	Total
23	(England)	Luke Thomas	MF	5	0	0	0	5
11	(England)	Jordy Hiwula	FW	4	0	0	0	4
17	(England)	Dujon Sterling	DF	4	0	0	0	4
21	(Sierra Leone)	Amadou Bakayoko	FW	4	0	0	0	4
10	(England)	Conor Chaplin	FW	3	0	0	0	3
20	(England)	Tom Bayliss	MF	3	0	0	0	3
24	(Nigeria)	Bright Enobakhare	FW	3	0	0	0	3
6	(Scotland)	Liam Kelly	MF	2	0	0	0	2
12	(England)	Junior Brown	DF	2	0	0	0	2
1	(England)	Lee Burge	GK	1	0	0	0	1
3	(England)	Brandon Mason	DF	1	0	0	0	1
8	(Republic of Ireland)	Michael Doyle	MF	1	0	0	0	1
22	(France)	Tony Andreu	MF	0	0	0	1	1
Totals				33	0	0	1	34

=== Yellow cards ===
Correct as of match played on 4 May 2019

No.	Nat.	Player	Pos.	League One	FA Cup	EFL Cup	EFL Trophy	Total
23	(England)	Luke Thomas	MF	7	1	0	0	8
20	(England)	Tom Bayliss	MF	5	0	0	0	5
6	(Scotland)	Liam Kelly	MF	3	0	0	1	4
10	(England)	Conor Chaplin	FW	4	0	0	0	4
16	(England)	Abu Ogogo	MF	3	0	0	1	4
17	(England)	Dujon Sterling	DF	4	0	0	0	4
1	(England)	Lee Burge	GK	3	0	0	0	3
3	(England)	Brandon Mason	DF	2	1	0	0	3
5	(England)	Tom Davies	DF	3	0	0	0	3
21	(Sierra Leone)	Amadou Bakayoko	FW	3	0	0	0	3
26	(England)	Jordan Shipley	MF	2	1	0	0	3
8	(Republic of Ireland)	Michael Doyle	MF	2	0	0	0	2
15	(Scotland)	Dominic Hyam	DF	2	0	0	0	2
18	(England)	Jonson Clarke-Harris	FW	2	0	0	0	2
37	(England)	Morgan Williams	DF	1	0	0	1	2
7	(England)	Jodi Jones	MF	1	0	0	0	1
11	(England)	Jordy Hiwula	FW	1	0	0	0	1
12	(England)	Junior Brown	DF	1	0	0	0	1
22	(France)	Tony Andreu	MF	1	0	0	0	1
24	(Nigeria)	Bright Enobakhare	FW	1	0	0	0	1
27	(England)	Jordon Thompson	DF	0	0	0	1	1
38	(England)	Josh Eccles	MF	0	0	0	1	1
Totals				51	3	0	5	59

=== Red cards ===
Correct as of match played on 4 May 2019

No.	Nat.	Player	Pos.	League One	FA Cup	EFL Cup	EFL Trophy	Total
24	(Nigeria)	Bright Enobakhare	FW	1	0	0	0	1
Totals				1	0	0	0	1

=== Captains ===
Correct as of match played on 4 May 2019

No.	Nat.	Player	Pos.	League One	FA Cup	EFL Cup	EFL Trophy	Total
6	(Scotland)	Liam Kelly	MF	23	0	0	0	23
8	(Republic of Ireland)	Michael Doyle	MF	21	1	0	0	22
8	(Republic of Ireland)	David Meyler	MF	2	0	0	0	2
16	(England)	Abu Ogogo	MF	0	0	0	2	2
5	(England)	Tom Davies	DF	0	0	1	0	1
37	(England)	Morgan Williams	DF	0	0	0	1	1
Totals				46	1	1	3	51

=== Suspensions served ===
No.	Nat.	Player	Pos.	Date suspended	Reason	Matches missed
24	(Nigeria)	Bright Enobakhare	FW	8 March 2019	1 red card	Fleetwood Town (H)

=== Monthly & weekly awards ===
No.	Nat.	Player	Pos.	Date	Award	Ref
1	(England)	Lee Burge	GK	17 September 2018	EFL Team of the Week	
1	(England)	Lee Burge	GK	1 October 2018	EFL Team of the Week	
17	(England)	Dujon Sterling	DF	15 October 2018	EFL Team of the Week	
20	(England)	Tom Bayliss	MF	25 October 2018	EFL Team of the Week	
	(England)	Mark Robins		9 November 2018	EFL League One Manager of the Month	
24	(Nigeria)	Bright Enobakhare	FW	15 April 2019	EFL Team of the Week	

=== End-of-season awards ===
No.	Nat.	Player	Pos.	Date	Award	Ref
11	(England)	Jordy Hiwula	FW	5 May 2019	CCFC Top Goalscorer	
15	(Scotland)	Dominic Hyam	DF	5 May 2019	CCFC Player of the Season	
24	(Nigeria)	Bright Enobakhare	FW	5 May 2019	CCFC Young Player of the Season	
15	(Scotland)	Dominic Hyam	DF	5 May 2019	CCFC Players' Player of the Season	
41	(England)	Sam McCallum	DF	5 May 2019	CCFC Development Player of the Season	
11	(England)	Jordy Hiwula	FW	5 May 2019	CCFC Goal of the Season	
2	(Scotland)	Jack Grimmer	DF	5 May 2019	CCFC Community Player of the Season	
	(England)	David Busst		5 May 2019	CCFC Michelle Ridley Award	
	(England)	Steve Ogrizovic		5 May 2019	CCFC Lifetime Achievement	

== Transfers ==
=== Transfers in ===
Date	Position	Nationality	Name	From	Fee	Ref.
1 July 2018	FW	(England)	Reise Allassani	Dulwich Hamlet	Undisclosed	
1 July 2018	DM	(England)	Bouwe Bosma	Lewes	Undisclosed	
1 July 2018	LB	(England)	Junior Brown	Shrewsbury Town	Free transfer	
1 July 2018	CF	(England)	Jonson Clarke-Harris	Rotherham United	Free transfer	
1 July 2018	CM	(England)	Abu Ogogo	Shrewsbury Town	Free transfer	
2 July 2018	CB	(England)	Morgan Williams	Mickleover Sports	Undisclosed	
6 July 2018	LB	(England)	Brandon Mason	Watford	Free transfer	
2 August 2018	FW	(England)	Jordy Hiwula	Huddersfield Town	Undisclosed	
3 August 2018	LW	(England)	Dexter Walters	Tamworth	Undisclosed	
7 August 2018	CF	(Sierra Leone)	Amadou Bakayoko	Walsall	Undisclosed	
9 August 2018	LB	(England)	Sam McCallum	Herne Bay	Free transfer	
11 September 2018	CF	(England)	David Bremang	Conquest Academy	Free transfer	
4 January 2019	FW	(England)	Conor Chaplin	Portsmouth	Undisclosed	
4 January 2019	CB	(England)	Declan Drysdale	Tranmere Rovers	Compensation	
31 January 2019	RW	(England)	Charlie Wakefield	Chelsea	Free transfer	

=== Transfers out ===
Date	Position	Nationality	Name	To	Fee	Ref.
1 July 2018	LB	(England)	Ryan Haynes	Shrewsbury Town	Undisclosed	
1 July 2018	LM	(England)	Devon Kelly-Evans	Nuneaton Town (Note: Devon Kelly-Evans joined Nuneaton Town following his release.)	Released	
1 July 2018	RB	(England)	Dion Kelly-Evans	Kettering Town (Note: Dion Kelly-Evans joined Kettering Town following his release.)	Released	
1 July 2018	LW	(England)	Kyel Reid	Chesterfield (Note: Kyel Reid joined Chesterfield following his release.)	Released	
1 July 2018	AM	(England)	Bilal Sayoud	Enfield Town (Note: Bilal Sayoud joined Enfield Town following his release.)	Released	
6 July 2018	CF	(Scotland)	Marc McNulty	Reading	Undisclosed	
16 July 2018	LB	(England)	Chris Stokes	Bury	Free transfer	
2 August 2018	CB	(England)	Rod McDonald	AFC Wimbledon	Undisclosed	
9 August 2018	RM	(Jersey)	Peter Vincenti	Macclesfield Town	Free transfer	
7 January 2019	LM	(England)	Kyle Finn	Hereford	Undisclosed	
31 January 2019	CM	(Republic of Ireland)	Michael Doyle	Notts County	Free transfer	
31 January 2019	CM	(England)	Abu Ogogo	Bristol Rovers	Free transfer	
1 February 2019	CF	(England)	Jonson Clarke-Harris	Bristol Rovers	Undisclosed	

=== Loans in ===
Date from	Position	Nationality	Name	From	Date until	Ref.
1 July 2018	RB	(England)	Dujon Sterling	Chelsea	31 May 2019	
16 August 2018	RW	(England)	Luke Thomas	Derby County	31 May 2019	
30 August 2018	FW	(England)	Conor Chaplin	Portsmouth	4 January 2019	
8 January 2019	FW	(Nigeria)	Bright Enobakhare	Wolverhampton Wanderers	31 May 2019	
31 January 2019	CM	(Republic of Ireland)	David Meyler	Reading	31 May 2019	
8 February 2019	GK	(England)	David Stockdale	Birmingham City	22 February 2019	

=== Loans out ===
Date from	Position	Nationality	Name	To	Date until	Ref.
27 July 2018	CF	(England)	Stuart Beavon	Wrexham	31 May 2019	
30 July 2018	CM	(England)	Callum Maycock	Macclesfield Town	31 May 2019	
2 August 2018	LM	(England)	Kyle Finn	Tamworth	19 October 2018	
9 August 2018	DM	(England)	Bouwe Bosma	Lewes	9 September 2018	
31 August 2018	CF	(England)	Jordan Ponticelli	Macclesfield Town	10 January 2019	
5 September 2018	DF	(England)	Jak Hickman	Ashton United	5 October 2018	
21 September 2018	DM	(England)	Bouwe Bosma	Southport	November 2018	
28 September 2018	FW	(England)	Reise Allassani	Ebbsfleet United	6 December 2018	
16 October 2018	DF	(Republic of Ireland)	Reece Ford	Mickleover Sports	6 January 2019	
26 October 2018	GK	(England)	Corey Addai	Mickleover Sports	25 November 2018	
30 October 2018	LM	(England)	Kyle Finn	Hereford	5 January 2019	
3 January 2019	DF	(England)	Lewis Green	Coleshill Town	February 2019	
18 January 2019	AM	(France)	Tony Andreu	(Scotland) Hamilton Academical	31 May 2019	
18 January 2019	DM	(England)	Bouwe Bosma	Salisbury	February 2019	
15 February 2019	FW	(England)	Reise Allassani	Woking	March 2019	
15 March 2019	DF	(England)	Jak Hickman	Hereford	13 April 2019	

=== Trials ===
Date	Position	Nationality	Name	From	Signed	Ref.
July 2018	LB	(England)	Brandon Mason	Watford	Yes	
July 2018	RW	(Scotland)	Daniel Armstrong	Wolverhampton Wanderers	No	
July 2018	CF	(France)	Florian Ankoue	Toulouse FC	No	
March 2019	MF	(England)	Dan Bartlett	Southampton	Yes	
