= Dexter Walters =

English association football player

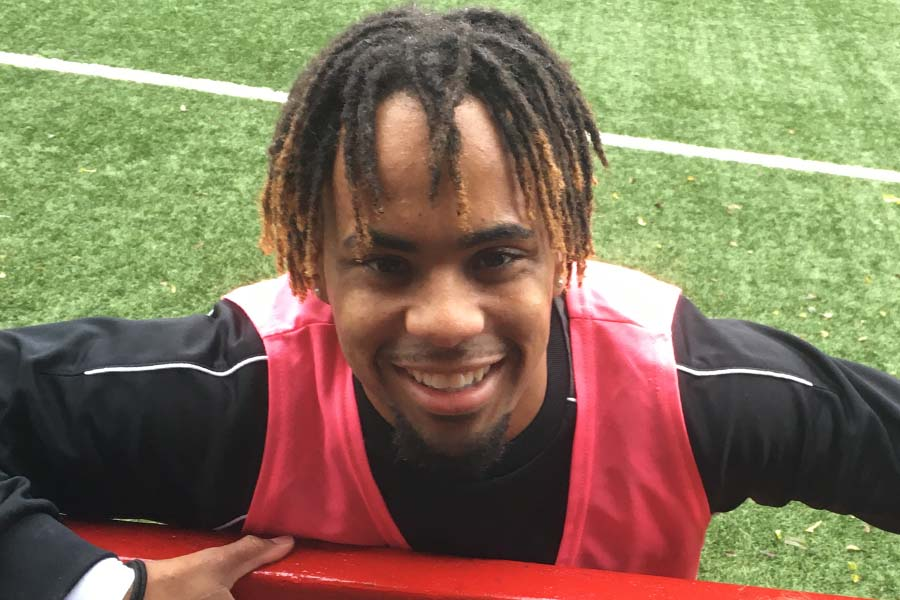
- Walters in October 2020

Personal information
- Full name: Dexter Walters
- Date of birth: 4 December 1998 (age 27)
- Place of birth: Birmingham, England
- Position: Winger

Team information
- Current team: Stratford Town

Youth career
- Romulus

Senior career*
Years	Team	Apps	(Gls)
–2017	Romulus		
2017–2018	Tamworth	4	(0)
2018	→ Sutton Coldfield Town (dual)		
2018–2020	Coventry City	0	(0)
2019–2020	→ Leamington (loan)	12	(0)
2020–2022	Tamworth	29	(1)
2021	→ Mickleover (loan)	7	(2)
2022–	Stratford Town	0	(0)
- * Club domestic league appearances and goals as of 18:00, 21 July 2022 (UTC)

Dexter Walters (born 4 December 1998) is an English footballer who plays for Southern League Premier Division Central side Stratford Town, where he plays as a winger.

== Playing career ==
=== Romulus ===
Walters began his career playing for non-league Romulus. Between the age of 16 and 18 years of age, Walters was part of the clubs scholar programme, and managed to break into the first team when he was a second-year scholar.

=== Tamworth ===
On 2 August 2017, Walters signed for National League North side Tamworth, along with Regan Upton and Sam Coulson.

Walters made his league debut for Tamworth]three days later, coming on as a substitute for Connor Taylor on the 83rd minute in what turned out to be a 1–0 home defeat at the hands of Bradford (Park Avenue), with the visitors scoring on the 90+7.

On 15 February 2018, Tamworth allowed Walters and teammate Regan Upton to join Sutton Coldfield Town on loan to gain some first team football; Walters joined on dual registration, whilst Upton joined on a one-month loan deal. Dexter returned to Tamworth for the final part of the season, and with the club already relegated, played a part in the final game of the season on 28 April 2018. He joined the action on the 61st minute in place of Michael Donohue. Tamworth lost the match 3–0 away to also relegated Gainsborough Trinity.

Following on from Tamworth being relegated to Southern League Premier Central, Dexter signed a new one-year contract with the club on 15 June 2018.

=== Coventry City ===
Walters signed a two-year deal with Coventry City on 3 August 2018, initially playing with the under-23 squad.

Dexter made his debut in the EFL Trophy on 9 October 2018, coming on as an 82nd-minute substitute for Tony Andreu in a game against Forest Green Rovers.

In October 2019, Dexter joined Leamington on a youth loan.

He was released by Coventry at the end of the 2019–20 season.

=== Return to Tamworth ===
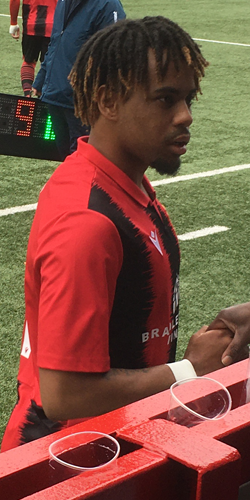
Dexter playing for Tamworth in September 2020.

Dexter re-signed for Southern League Premier Division Central side Tamworth on 5 August 2020, following the expiry of his Coventry City contract.

Walters made his second debut for Tamworth on 22 September 2020, playing the full match in an FA Cup first round fixture at home to Stourbridge, helping Tamworth come back from 3–1 down to draw 3–3 and force the match to penalties, with Tamworth winning 5–4 on penalties, and progressing to the next round.

Dexter made his Southern League Premier Division Central debut on 26 September 2020, and was instrumental in helping Tamworth come from behind to defeat St Ives Town, providing the cross for Jordan Graham to add the third goal, as Tamworth ran out 4–2 winners.

Dexter returned to the squad after a short lay off with an injury in a Southern League Premier Division Central fixture at home to Biggleswade Town on 24 October 2020, Walters came on as a 66th-minute substitute for Aaron O'Connor and scored his first goal, and Tamworth's third goal in a 3–0 victory for the home side.

Dexter agreed a deal to stay with Tamworth for the 2021–22 season on 31 May 2021.

=== Mickleover (loan) ===
On 28 October 2021 Walters joined Northern Premier League Premier Division side Mickleover on loan until 5 January 2022. Walters made his debut for Mickleover on 1 November 2021 in a FA Trophy fixture at home to Grantham Town, losing 1-0 and exiting the competition. Dexter made his Northern Premier League Premier Division debut in the next match, as Mickleover were defeated 3–1 away at Radcliffe Borough on 8 November 2021. Walters scored twice in a Northern Premier League Premier Division fixture finishing 2–2 at home to Warrington on 22 November 2021.

=== Return to Tamworth ===
Walters was recalled by parent club Tamworth early due to an injury crisis, and played on 27 December 2021 in a 2–0 defeat away to rivals Nuneaton Borough.

Tamworth announced on 8 July 2022 that Walters would return to the club for pre-season matches in the build up to the 2022–23 season. However, on 16 July 2022, Walters was released by the club.

=== Stratford Town ===
On 21 July 2022, it was confirmed that Dexter had signed for Southern League Premier Division Central club Stratford Town.

== Career statistics ==
As of 21 July 2022

Appearances and goals by club, season and competition
Club	Season	League			FA Cup		League Cup		Other		Total	
Club	Season	Division	Apps	Goals	Apps	Goals	Apps	Goals	Apps	Goals	Apps	Goals
Tamworth	2017–18	National League North	4	0	0	0	—		0	0	4	0
Coventry City	2018–19	League One	0	0	0	0	0	0	1 (Note: Appearance in the EFL Trophy.)	0	1	0
Coventry City	2019–20	Championship	0	0	0	0	0	0	0	0	0	0
Coventry City	Total		0	0	0	0	0	0	1	0	1	0
Leamington (loan)	2019–20	National League North	12	0	1	0	—		1 (Note: Appearance in the FA Trophy.)	0	14	0
Tamworth	2020–21	Southern League Premier Division Central	3	1	1	0	—		1	0	5	1
Tamworth	2021–22	Southern League Premier Division Central	26	0	5	2	—		1 (Note: One appearance in Southern League Cup)	1 (Note: One goal in Southern League Cup)	32	3
Tamworth	Total		29	1	6	2	0	0	2	1	37	4
Mickleover (loan)	2021–22	Northern Premier League Premier Division	7	2	0	0	—		1	0	8	2
Stratford Town	2022–23	Southern League Premier Division Central	0	0	0	0	—		0	0	0	0
Career total			52	3	7	2	0	0	5	1	64	6
