= Junior Brown (footballer) =

English footballer

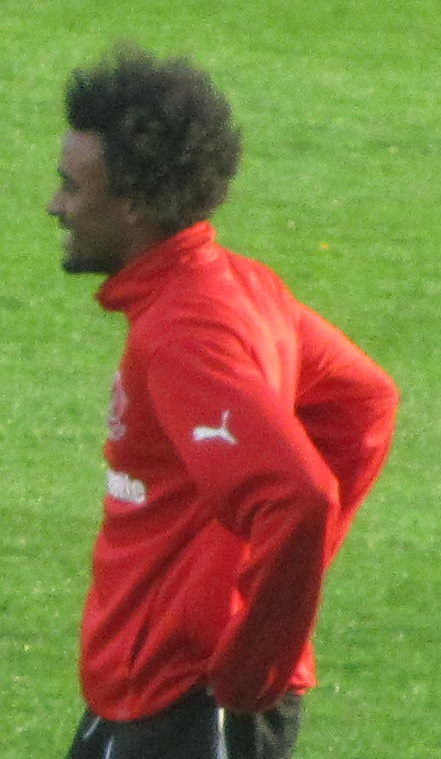
- Brown training with Fleetwood Town in 2013

Personal information
- Full name: Junior Brown
- Date of birth: 7 May 1989 (age 37)
- Place of birth: Crewe, England
- Height: 1.75 m (5 ft 9 in)
- Positions: Left-back; midfielder

Team information
- Current team: Nantwich Town

Youth career
- –2007: Crewe Alexandra

Senior career*
Years	Team	Apps	(Gls)
2007–2008	Crewe Alexandra	1	(0)
2007–2008	→ Kidsgrove Athletic (loan)		
2008–2009	FC Halifax Town	33	(8)
2009–2010	Northwich Victoria	32	(3)
2010–2014	Fleetwood Town	106	(13)
2014	→ Tranmere Rovers (loan)	9	(1)
2014–2015	Oxford United	11	(0)
2014–2015	→ Mansfield Town (loan)	5	(1)
2015	Mansfield Town	19	(1)
2015–2018	Shrewsbury Town	89	(6)
2018–2020	Coventry City	22	(0)
2019–2020	→ Scunthorpe United (loan)	20	(0)
2020–2021	Scunthorpe United	0	(0)
2021–2022	Bristol Rovers	6	(0)
2022–2024	Whitchurch Alport		
2024	Hednesford Town	2	(0)
2025–	Nantwich Town		
- * Club domestic league appearances and goals as of 19:29, 13 March 2025 (UTC)

Junior Brown (born 7 May 1989) is an English professional footballer who plays as a left back for Nantwich Town.

== Career ==
=== Crewe Alexandra ===
Brown began his career at hometown club Crewe Alexandra, for whom he made a solitary appearance as substitute in a league match with Brighton on 2 February 2008.

=== Non-league ===
After leaving Crewe, Brown dropped into non-league football with spells at the newly formed FC Halifax Town, and then Northwich Victoria.

=== Fleetwood Town ===
After the Vics' problems off the field he signed for Fleetwood Town. He was part of the squad that saw Fleetwood promoted into the Football League for the first time in their history, and was hailed for his good form on his personal return to league football.

Brown joined League One side Tranmere Rovers on loan until the end of the 2013–14 season on 6 March 2014.

=== Oxford United ===
On 31 July 2014 Brown terminated his contract with Fleetwood and agreed to join League Two side Oxford United on a 12-month contract.

=== Mansfield Town ===
Brown joined Mansfield Town on a permanent transfer in January 2015 having been on loan at the club since November 2014.

=== Shrewsbury Town ===
Brown joined Shrewsbury Town in League One on a free transfer in June 2015, re-uniting with his former manager at Fleetwood, Micky Mellon. Establishing himself as first choice left-back at the club, he made forty appearances in all competitions during the 2015–16 season, before picking up a knee ligament injury in April 2016. This injury caused him to miss most of the season.

Brown signed a two-year contract extension in June 2016, keeping him at the club until summer 2018. Having found some goalscoring form during his second season, Brown's fifth goal of the campaign, the matchwinner in a 1−0 home victory over Southend United in April 2017, notably all-but sealed Shrewsbury's League One status at the expense of local rivals Port Vale.

He was offered a new contract by Shrewsbury at the end of the 2017–18 season. Brown joined Coventry City on 1 July 2018 on a 2-year deal.

=== Scunthorpe United ===
On 29 August 2019, Brown joined League Two side Scunthorpe United on loan until January where he was given the 28 shirt. He later signed permanently, and was one of 17 players released by Scunthorpe at the end of the 2020–21 season.

=== Bristol Rovers ===
On 31 August 2021, Brown joined recently relegated League Two club Bristol Rovers on a one-year deal. Brown made his debut on 11 September 2021, coming off of the bench in a 1–0 defeat at Hartlepool United. Brown picked up a thigh injury in a 1–0 victory over Harrogate Town that would prove to keep him out for a number of months. In January 2022, manager Joey Barton revealed that Brown would be allowed to move on from the club with the defender struggling to return to full fitness having not played since the thigh injury in October. Having been unable to find a move in the January transfer window, Brown was released by the club at the end of the season.

=== Whitchurch Alport ===
Following his release from Bristol Rovers, Brown signed for Midland Football League Premier Division club Whitchurch Alport, scoring his first goal in over four years with the last minute winner in an FA Cup victory over Ossett United.

=== Hednesford Town ===
On 27 March 2024, Brown joined Northern Premier League Division One West club Hednesford Town.

=== Nantwich Town ===
In August 2025 he joined Nantwich Town, signing for them after playing for the club as a trialist in pre-season friendlies.

== Style of play ==
Brown can play anywhere on the left-hand side of the pitch either as a winger, wing-back or full-back.

== Personal life ==
Following retirement from professional football, Brown began work as a consultant in fire engineering, studying a Master's degree at University of Central Lancashire.

== Career statistics ==
As of end of 2023–24 season

Appearances and goals by club, season and competition
Club	Season	League			Cup		League Cup		Other		Total	
Club	Season	Division	Apps	Goals	Apps	Goals	Apps	Goals	Apps	Goals	Apps	Goals
Crewe Alexandra	2007–08	Football League One	1	0	0	0	0	0	—		1	0
FC Halifax Town	2008–09	NPL Division One North	33	8	0	0	0	0	—		33	8
Northwich Victoria	2009–10	Conference North	32	3	1	0	—				33	3
Fleetwood Town	2010–11	Football Conference	21	2	0	0	—		2 (Note: Appearances in Conference play-offs)	0	23	2
Fleetwood Town	2011–12	Football Conference	21	0	2	0	—				23	0
Fleetwood Town	2012–13	Football League Two	43	10	2	1	0	0	—		45	11
Fleetwood Town	2013–14	Football League Two	21	1	3	0	1	0	6 (Note: Appearance(s) in the Football League Trophy)	0	31	1
Fleetwood Town	Total		106	13	7	1	1	0	8	0	122	15
Tranmere Rovers	2013–14	Football League One	9	1	0	0	0	0	—		9	1
Oxford United	2014–15	Football League Two	11	0	1	0	2	0	1	0	15	0
Mansfield Town (loan)	2014–15	Football League Two	5	1	0	0	0	0	—		5	1
Mansfield Town	2014–15	Football League Two	19	1	0	0	0	0	—		19	1
Shrewsbury Town	2015–16	Football League One	31	0	5	0	2	0	2	1	40	1
Shrewsbury Town	2016–17	EFL League One	43	5	3	0	2	0	3	0	51	5
Shrewsbury Town	2017–18	EFL League One	15	1	0	0	1	0	1	0	17	1
Shrewsbury Town	Total		89	6	8	0	5	0	6	1	108	7
Coventry City	2018–19	League One	22	0	0	0	1	0	0	0	23	0
Scunthorpe United	2019–20 (loan)	League Two	20	0	1	0	0	0	3	0	24	0
Scunthorpe United	2020–21	League Two	14	0	1	0	0	0	0	0	15	0
Scunthorpe United	Total		34	0	2	0	0	0	3	0	39	0
Bristol Rovers	2021–22	League Two	6	0	0	0	0	0	0	0	6	0
Hednesford Town	2023–24	NPL Division One West	2	0	0	0	—		1 (Note: Appearance(s) in Walsall Senior Cup)	0	3	0
Career totals			349	33	19	1	9	0	19	1	396	35
