= Billy Stedman =

English footballer (born 1999)

Personal information
- Full name: Billy-Jay Stedman
- Date of birth: 3 November 1999 (age 27)
- Place of birth: Swindon, England
- Height: 5 ft 7 in (1.70 m)
- Position: Attacking midfielder

Team information
- Current team: Sholing

Youth career
- Southampton
- 2018: Coventry City

Senior career*
Years	Team	Apps	(Gls)
2018–2019	Coventry City	0	(0)
2020–2021	Víkingur	19	(1)
2021–2022	Dorchester Town	12	(2)
2022–2023	Portadown	27	(0)
2023–2024	Havant & Waterlooville	4	(0)
2024	Bracknell Town		
2024–	Sholing		
- * Club domestic league appearances and goals as of 09:42, 23 February 2025 (GMT+7)

Billy-Jay Stedman (born 3 November 1999) is an English professional footballer who plays as an attacking midfielder for Southern League Premier Division South club Sholing.

== Career ==
=== Coventry City ===
Stedman started his career in the youth system at Coventry City before making his debut in an EFL Trophy 3–0 defeat against Arsenal U21 coming on in the 87th minute for Reise Allassani.

=== Víkingur ===
In February 2020, Stedman moved to Víkingur of the 1. Deild Karla, Iceland's second tier. His first goal in senior football came on 26 August 2020, scoring his side's third goal in a 3–0 win over Leiknir Reykjavík. During his season with the club, he made a total of 20 appearances in all competitions, scoring 1 goal.

=== Dorchester Town ===
Stedman signed for Southern Football League Premier Division South side Dorchester Town on 15 November 2021. He scored his first goals for the club on 4 December 2021, scoring a brace in a 3–1 win over Harrow Borough. He made a total of 11 appearances for the club, scoring 2 goals.

=== Portadown ===
On 31 January 2022, Stedman signed for NIFL Premiership club Portadown until the end of the season. He scored his first goal for the club on 16 April 2022, opening the scoring in an eventual 2–1 loss away to Ballymena United. On 3 May 2022, Stedman scored a vital winning goal in a 3–2 win away to Annagh United in the NIFL Premiership promotion/relegation play-off first leg.

== Career statistics ==
As of match played 6 May 2022

Appearances and goals by club, season and competition
Club	Season	League			National Cup (Note: Includes FA Cup, Icelandic Cup & Irish Cup)		League Cup (Note: Includes EFL Cup)		Other		Total	
Club	Season	Division	Apps	Goals	Apps	Goals	Apps	Goals	Apps	Goals	Apps	Goals
Coventry City	2018–19	EFL League One	0	0	0	0	0	0	1 (Note: Appearances in the EFL Trophy)	0	1	0
Víkingur	2020	1. Deild Karla	19	1	1	0	—		—		20	1
Dorchester Town	2021–22	Southern Football League Premier Division South	11	2	—		—		—		11	2
Portadown	2021–22	NIFL Premiership	12	1	1	0	—		2 (Note: Appearances in the NIFL Premiership promotion/relegation play-offs)	1	15	2
Career total			42	4	2	0	0	0	3	1	46	5
