= Leamington F.C. =

Association football club in Leamington Spa, England

Coordinates: 52°14′40″N 01°30′10″W

Leamington
- Full name: Leamington Football Club
- Nickname: The Brakes
- Founded: 1933
- Ground: New Windmill Ground, Leamington Spa
- Capacity: 2,300 (294 seated)
- Chairman: Jim Scott
- Manager: Scott Easterlow
- League: Southern League Premier Division Central
- 2025–26: National League North, 24th of 24 (relegated)
- Website: leamingtonfc.co.uk
Home colours	Away colours

Leamington FC fans on the North Bank Terrace

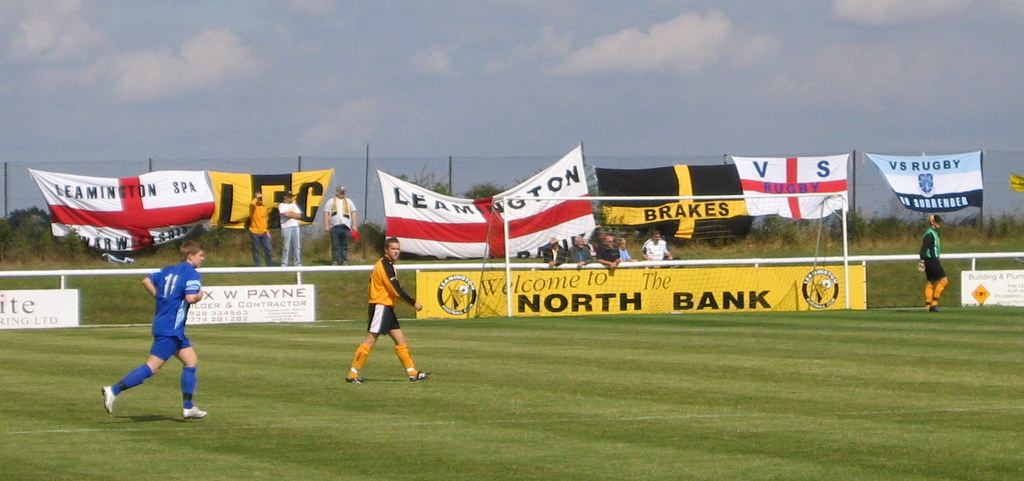
Leamington FC fans display their flags at the New Windmill Ground

Junior teams gather at the New Windmill Ground's old Sheepside Stand, for a photo session

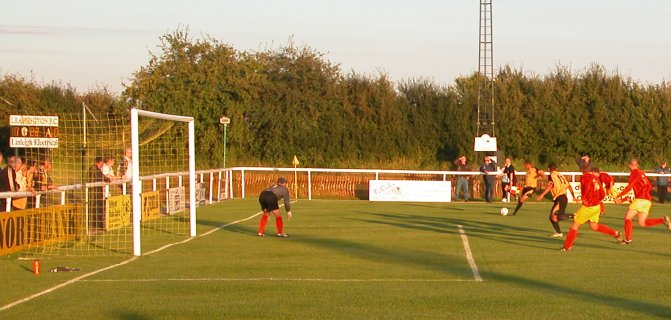
Leamington vs Banbury at the New Windmill Ground, North Bank End

Leamington Football Club is a football club based in Leamington Spa, Warwickshire, England. They are currently members of the Southern League Premier Division Central and play at the New Windmill Ground near Bishop's Tachbrook.

== History ==
The club was established in 1933 as the works team of Lockheed Borg & Beck, gaining the nickname "the Brakes" as a result of the products manufactured by the company. They initially played in the Warwick & District League, before joining the Coventry Works League for the 1934–35 season. In 1940 the club transferred to the Leamington & District League, but returned to the Coventry Works League two years later. In 1944 they changed leagues again, becoming members of the Coventry & District League. In 1947 the club was renamed Lockheed Leamington when they joined the Central Amateur League. After two third-place finishes the club joined the Birmingham Combination in 1949. In 1954 the league was disbanded and like most other clubs, Leamington joined the Birmingham & District League. Placed in the Southern Division for a transitional season, they were the division's runners-up, earning a place in Division One the following season. In 1960 the league was reduced to a single division and the club were champions in 1961–62.

The Birmingham & District League was renamed the West Midlands (Regional) League in 1962 and Leamington retained their league title in 1962–63 and then joined the Midland League. After finishing third in their first season, they won the Midland League title in 1964–65. The club remained in the league until 1971 when they moved up to Division One North of the Southern League. When Lockheed was renamed Automotive Products in 1973, the football club was renamed AP Leamington. In their first season under the new name the club won the Southern League's League Cup. In 1974–75 they reached the first round of the FA Cup for the first time, losing 2–1 at home to Southend United. Another first round appearance the following season ended with a 3–2 defeat at home to Stafford Rangers in front of a record crowd of 3,200. They went on to finish the season as Division One North runners-up, earning promotion to the Premier Division.

In the 1977–78 FA Cup, AP Leamington reached the second round; after beating Enderby Town 6–1 in the first round, they were drawn against Southend in the second. The first game at the Windmill Ground was drawn 0–0 and the club lost 4–0 in the replay at Roots Hall. They reached the second round again the next season, eventually losing 1–0 at home to Torquay United. However, a seventh-place finish in the league was enough to secure membership of the new Alliance Premier League, the national non-League division. The club struggled in the new league, finishing in the bottom five in both of their first two seasons, before finishing bottom of the league in 1981–82, which resulted in relegation back to the Southern League Premier Division. Although they won the Premier Division the following season, the club were denied promotion due to the Windmill Ground failing to meet the ground grading criteria.

The 1983–84 season saw Leamington reach the first round of the FA Cup, losing 1–0 to Gillingham, and they also won the League Cup and the Champions Cup. However, the club finished bottom of the Premier Division in 1984–85 and were relegated to the Midland Division, at which point the "AP" part of the name was dropped. In both of the next two seasons they finished in the bottom two of the Midland Division, and at the end of the second the club dropped into the Midland Combination Premier Division. After losing their Windmill Ground, they went into abeyance at the end of the 1987–88 season.

In 2000 the club was reactivated, joining Division Two of the Midland Combination. They won Division Two at the first attempt, and were Division One runners-up the following season, earning promotion to the Premier Division. Following a third-place finish in 2002–03, the club were Premier Division runners-up in 2003–04 and won the league title the following season, securing promotion to the Midland Alliance. In 2005–06 they entered the FA Cup for the first time since reforming and went on to reach the first round, eventually losing 9–1 at Colchester United. The club were Midland Alliance champions the following season, also winning the League Cup, and were promoted to Division One Midlands of the Southern League. Their first season in the Southern League saw them finish as runners-up, qualifying for the promotion play-offs; after beating Rushall Olympic 1–0 in the semi-final, the club lost 2–1 to Stourbridge in the final. However, they went on to win Division One Midlands in 2008–09 and were promoted to the Premier Division.

Leamington finished fifth in the Premier Division in 2010–11, but lost 3–1 to Hednesford Town in the play-off semi-finals. Two seasons later they were Southern League champions, earning promotion to the Conference North. After finishing thirteenth in their first season in the division, the club ended the 2014–15 season in the relegation zone and were relegated back to the Southern League. They finished fifth in 2015–16 and reached the play-off final after beating Redditch United 3–1 on penalties; however, they lost the final 2–1 to Hungerford Town. The following season saw them finish as Premier Division runners-up, and after beating Slough Town 1–0 in the play-off semi-finals, they defeated Hitchin Town 2–1 in the final to secure promotion back to the renamed National League North. In 2022–23 the club finished third-from-bottom of the National League North and were relegated to the Premier Division Central of the Southern League. The following season saw the club finish third in the Premier Division Central. In the promotion play-offs, the club beat Redditch United 1–0 (after extra time) in the semi-finals before defeating AFC Telford United 1–0 in the final to secure an immediate return to the National League North.

== Ground ==
The club initially played at Tachbrook Road, which was later renamed the Windmill Ground after the adjacent Windmill pub. The ground had previously been used by Leamington Town, but had been sold to Coventry City for £1,739 6s 8d when the club folded in 1937, with Coventry using it as the home ground of their 'A' team. However, the ground was bought by Lockheed after World War II and covered terracing was built to complement the existing seated stand. Floodlights were installed in 1965, having previously been used at Maine Road. Capacity was gradually expanded to 5,000, of which 1,600 was under cover and 440 seated.

During the 1983–84 season the ground was sold to the AC Lloyd property development company despite the club trying to buy the site. Plans to build a new ground were unsuccessful, as were efforts to move to the Edmonscote Athletics Stadium. As a result, the club went into abeyance, with the last match at the Windmill Ground being played on 16 April 1988, a 2–2 draw with Walsall Wood in front of 500 spectators. Despite the club's status, a group of supporters purchased land on Harbury Lane in nearby Whitnash, which was turned into football pitches from 1993. After being officially opened in 1999 as the New Windmill Ground, the club started playing again in 2000. Floodlights, seats and the PA system were taken from Oxford United's Manor Ground, which closed in 2001. In July 2021 a new 198-seat stand was opened, named after life president and former chairman Mick Brady.

The club were to move to a new 5,000-capacity stadium at Europa Way at the start of the 2022–23 season. Land was purchased in January 2019 and construction was expected to begin in autumn 2020, however it has since been delayed and as of January 2019 the ground is still bare. The £6 million ground would include an artificial pitch, conference and hospitality facilities and a gym.

== Current squad ==
As of 10 August 2026

Note: Flags indicate national team as defined under FIFA eligibility rules; some limited exceptions apply. Players may hold more than one non-FIFA nationality.

No.	Pos.	Nation	Player
1	GK	WAL	Cian Tyler
2	DF	ENG	Jahdahn Fridye-Harper
3	DF	IRL	Callum Cockerill-Mollett
4	DF	ENG	Nat Kelly
5	DF	SKN	Ruben Freeman
6	MF	ENG	Cameron Eubank
7	FW	ENG	Kai Tonge
9	FW	USA	Chris Wreh
10	MF	IRL	Kyle Finn (captain)
11	FW	ENG	Owen Farmer

No.	Pos.	Nation	Player
12	FW	ENG	Dexter Walters
13	GK	ENG	Jacob Humphries
14	MF	GHA	Koby Arthur
15	MF	GHA	Iddriss Fuseini
16	FW	ENG	Dennis Halliday
17	MF	ENG	Louie Rea (on loan from Birmingham City)
18	MF	ENG	Oli Buckby
19	MF	ENG	Kyle Belmonte
20	MF	ENG	Raj Palit
21	DF	ENG	Nathan Kabeya

== Honours ==
- Southern League
  - Premier Division champions 1982–83, 2012–13
  - Division One Midlands champions 2008–09
  - Champions Cup winners 1973–74, 1983–84
  - League Cup winners 1973–74, 1983–84
- Midland League
  - Champions 1964–65
- West Midlands (Regional) League
  - Champions 1961–62, 1962–63
- Midland Alliance
  - Champions 2006–07
  - League Cup winners 2006–07
  - Joe McGorian Cup 2007–08
- Midland Combination
  - Premier Division champions 2004–05
  - Division Two champions 2001–02
- Birmingham Senior Cup
  - Winners 1951–52, 1955–56, 1960–61, 1969–70, 1971–72, 2016–17, 2018–19, 2021–22

== Records ==
- Best FA Cup performance: Second round, 1977–78, 1978–79
- Best FA Trophy performance: Quarter-finals, 1983–84
- Best FA Vase performance: Quarter-finals, 2006–07
- Most appearances: James Mace, 420
- Most goals: Josh Blake, 187
- Record attendance:
  - Windmill Ground: 3,500 vs Hereford United reserves, Birmingham Senior Cup final, 1950–51
  - New Windmill Ground: 2,131 vs Coventry City, friendly, 2 July 2022

== See also ==
- Leamington F.C. players
- Leamington F.C. managers
