= Brandon Mason =

English footballer (born 1997)

Personal information
- Full name: Brandon Alexander Mason
- Date of birth: 30 September 1997 (age 29)
- Place of birth: Westminster, England
- Height: 5 ft 8 in (1.73 m)
- Position: Defender

Team information
- Current team: Farnham Town
- Number: 3

Youth career
- 2011–2016: Watford

Senior career*
| Years | Team | Apps | (Gls) |
| 2016–2018 | Watford | 2 | (0) |
| 2018 | → Dundee United (loan) | 1 | (0) |
| 2018–2021 | Coventry City | 36 | (0) |
| 2020–2021 | → St Mirren (loan) | 7 | (0) |
| 2022 | Milton Keynes Dons | 0 | (0) |
| 2022–2023 | Crawley Town | 12 | (0) |
| 2023–2025 | Wealdstone | 27 | (0) |
| 2025 | St Albans City | 20 | (0) |
| 2025– | Farnham Town | 55 | (1) |
- * Club domestic league appearances and goals as of 14:10, 20 November 2026 (UTC)

Brandon Alexander Mason (born 30 September 1997) is an English professional footballer who plays as a defender for National League South club Farnham Town.

== Club career ==
A graduate of the Watford youth system, Mason was handed a professional contract ahead of the 2016–17 season. He made his Premier League debut for Watford on 1 January 2017 in a 4–1 home defeat against Tottenham Hotspur. He then made his first start for Watford in their FA Cup fixture against Burton Albion six days later, setting up a goal for Christian Kabasele. In January 2018, Mason joined Scottish Championship club Dundee United until the end of the 2017–18 season. He made his debut in a 6–1 defeat at Falkirk on 6 January, but made only one further appearance for the club. He was later released by Watford at the end of the season.

In July 2018, Mason signed a two-year contract with newly promoted League One club Coventry City. He played his first match for the "Sky Blues" on 4 August 2018 in a 2–1 home defeat to Scunthorpe United. In September 2019 he signed a new three-year contract with Coventry. Mason joined Scottish Premiership club St Mirren on a season-long loan on 5 October 2020 and went on to make 13 appearances in all competitions. He was released by Coventry City in August 2021.

On 18 March 2022, Mason joined League One club Milton Keynes Dons on a short-term contract, primarily as cover for left wing-back Daniel Harvie. He failed to make a single appearance for the club and was later one of six players released at the end of the 2021–22 season.

Mason signed for EFL League Two club Crawley Town on a two-year deal in July 2022 following a trial spell at the club.

Mason signed for National League club Wealdstone in October 2023 following a trial spell at the club.

On 25 January 2025, Mason joined National League South side St Albans City.

In May 2025, Mason joined newly promoted Southern League Premier Division South side Farnham Town on a one-year deal.

== Career statistics ==
As of 7 November 2026

Appearances and goals by club, season and competition
| Club | Season | League | | | National Cup | | League Cup | | Other | | Total | |
| Club | Season | Division | Apps | Goals | Apps | Goals | Apps | Goals | Apps | Goals | Apps | Goals |
|---|---|---|---|---|---|---|---|---|---|---|---|---|
| Watford | 2016–17 | Premier League | 2 | 0 | 2 | 0 | 0 | 0 | — | | 4 | 0 |
| Dundee United (loan) | 2017–18 | Scottish Championship | 1 | 0 | 1 | 0 | 0 | 0 | — | | 2 | 0 |
| Coventry City | 2018–19 | League One | 25 | 0 | 1 | 0 | 0 | 0 | 2 (Note: Appearance(s) in EFL Trophy.) | 0 | 28 | 0 |
| Coventry City | 2019–20 | League One | 11 | 0 | 3 | 0 | 1 | 0 | 2 | 0 | 17 | 0 |
| Coventry City | 2020–21 | Championship | 0 | 0 | 0 | 0 | 1 | 0 | — | | 1 | 0 |
| Coventry City | Total | | 36 | 0 | 4 | 0 | 2 | 0 | 4 | 0 | 46 | 0 |
| St. Mirren (loan) | 2020–21 | Scottish Premiership | 8 | 0 | 1 | 0 | 4 | 0 | — | | 13 | 0 |
| Milton Keynes Dons | 2021–22 | League One | 0 | 0 | — | | — | | 0 | 0 | 0 | 0 |
| Crawley Town | 2022–23 | League Two | 12 | 0 | 0 | 0 | 0 | 0 | 2 | 0 | 14 | 0 |
| Wealdstone | 2023–24 | National League | 20 | 0 | 1 | 0 | — | | 3 (Note: Appearance(s) in FA Trophy) | 0 | 24 | 0 |
| Wealdstone | 2024–25 | National League | 7 | 0 | 1 | 0 | — | | 4 (Note: Appearance(s) in National League Cup) | 0 | 12 | 0 |
| Wealdstone | Total | | 27 | 0 | 2 | 0 | — | | 7 | 0 | 36 | 0 |
| St Albans City | 2024–25 | National League South | 20 | 0 | 0 | 0 | — | | 0 | 0 | 20 | 0 |
| Farnham Town | 2025–26 | Southern League Premier Division South | 41 | 1 | 4 | 0 | — | | 5 (Note: Three appearances in FA Trophy, two in Southern League Premier Division South play-offs) | 1 | 50 | 2 |
| Farnham Town | 2026–27 | National League South | 14 | 0 | 2 | 0 | — | | 0 | 0 | 16 | 0 |
| Farnham Town | Total | | 55 | 1 | 6 | 0 | — | | 5 | 0 | 66 | 1 |
| Career total | | | 161 | 1 | 16 | 0 | 6 | 0 | 18 | 1 | 200 | 2 |

== Honours ==
Coventry City

- EFL League One: 2019–20

Farnham Town

- Surrey Senior Cup: 2025–26
- Southern League Premier Division South play-offs: 2025–26
