= Charlie Wakefield (footballer, born 1998) =

English footballer

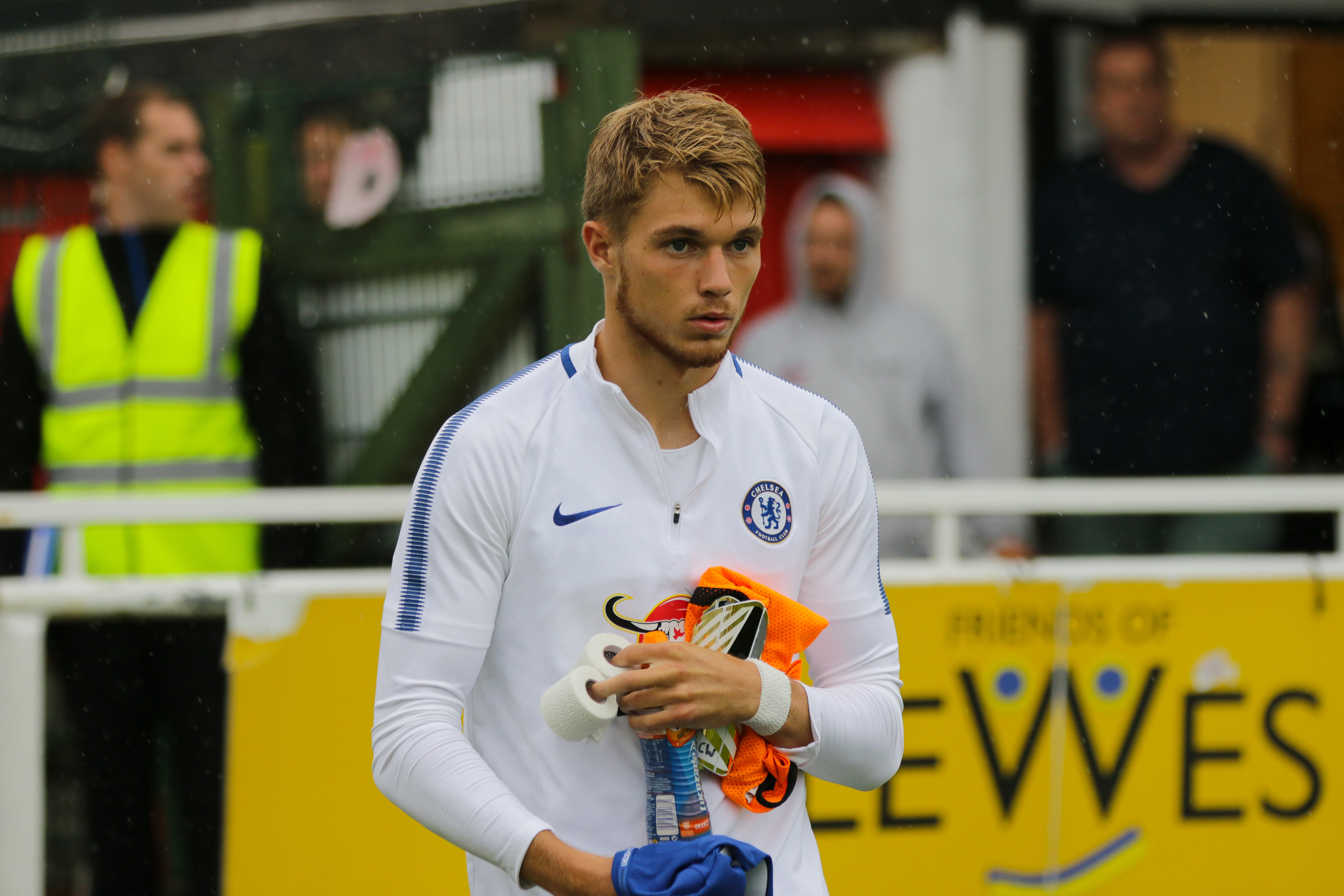
- Wakefield in 2017.

Personal information
- Full name: Charlie Mark Wakefield
- Date of birth: 10 April 1998 (age 28)
- Place of birth: Worthing, England
- Position: Winger

Youth career
- Brighton & Hove Albion
- 2009–2017: Chelsea

Senior career*
Years	Team	Apps	(Gls)
2017–2019	Chelsea	0	(0)
2017	→ Stevenage (loan)	0	(0)
2019–2020	Coventry City	9	(0)
2020–2021	Wealdstone	11	(1)
2021	Bromley	12	(1)
2021–2023	Yeovil Town	57	(5)
2023	→ Woking (loan)	3	(0)
2023–2024	Woking	7	(0)
2024	→ Braintree Town (loan)	14	(0)

International career^{‡}
- England U16
2014	England U17	2	(0)
- * Club domestic league appearances and goals as of 19:38, 21 April 2024 (UTC) ‡ National team caps and goals as of 21:46, 31 January 2019 (UTC)

Charlie Mark Wakefield (born 10 April 1998) is an English professional footballer who plays as a winger most recently for Woking.

== Career ==
Born in Worthing, Wakefield began his career with Brighton & Hove Albion and Chelsea. He signed a loan deal with Stevenage in August 2017, but never played for the club due to injury.

He moved to Coventry City in January 2019. He was released by Coventry at the end of the 2019–20 season.

Wakefield signed for Wealdstone on a short-term deal on 2 October 2020.

On 7 January 2021, Wakefield signed for National League side Bromley following his departure from Wealdstone.

At the end of the 2020–21 season, Wakefield signed for fellow National League side Yeovil Town on a one-year deal following his departure from Bromley. He extended his contract for another season in June 2022. On 23 March 2023, Wakefield joined National League side Woking on loan until the end of the season. At the end of the 2022–23 season, Wakefield was released by Yeovil following the club's relegation from the National League.

On 14 June 2023, it was announced that Wakefield would return to Woking on a permanent basis, signing a one-year deal. On 13 February 2024, Wakefield joined National League South side, Braintree Town on loan for the remainder of the campaign. On 26 April 2024, it was announced that Wakefield would leave Woking at the end of his contract in June.

== International career ==
He has represented England at under-16 and under-17 youth international levels.

== Career statistics ==
As of match played 6 May 2024

Appearances and goals by club, season and competition
Club	Season	League			FA Cup		League Cup		Other		Total	
Club	Season	Division	Apps	Goals	Apps	Goals	Apps	Goals	Apps	Goals	Apps	Goals
Chelsea U23	2016–17	—			—		—		2 (Note: Appearances in EFL Trophy)	0	2	0
Chelsea	2017–18	Premier League	0	0	0	0	0	0	0	0	0	0
Chelsea	2018–19	Premier League	0	0	0	0	0	0	0	0	0	0
Chelsea	Total		0	0	0	0	0	0	0	0	0	0
Stevenage (loan)	2017–18	League Two	0	0	0	0	0	0	0	0	0	0
Coventry City	2018–19	League One	8	0	0	0	0	0	0	0	8	0
Coventry City	2019–20	League One	1	0	0	0	0	0	2	0	3	0
Coventry City	Total		9	0	0	0	0	0	2	0	11	0
Wealdstone	2020–21	National League	11	1	1	0	—		1 (Note: Appearance in FA Trophy)	1	13	2
Bromley	2020–21	National League	12	1	—		—		0	0	12	1
Yeovil Town	2021–22	National League	40	5	5	3	—		1 (Note: Appearance in Somerset Premier Cup)	0	46	8
Yeovil Town	2022–23	National League	17	0	1	0	—		3 (Note: One appearance in FA Trophy, two appearances in Somerset Premier Cup)	0	21	0
Yeovil Town	Total		57	5	6	3	—		4	0	67	8
Woking (loan)	2022–23	National League	3	0	—		—		1 (Note: One appearance in National League play-offs)	0	4	0
Woking	2023–24	National League	7	0	2	0	—		0	0	9	0
Braintree Town (loan)	2023–24	National League South	14	0	—		—		3 (Note: Two appearance in National League South play-offs)	1	17	1
Career total			113	7	9	3	0	0	13	2	135	12

== Honours ==
Braintree Town

- National League South play-offs: 2024
