= Reise Allassani =

English footballer

Personal information
- Full name: Reise Malcolm Allassani
- Date of birth: 3 January 1996 (age 30)
- Place of birth: London, England
- Position: Winger

Team information
- Current team: Sevenoaks Town

Youth career
- 2004–2015: Crystal Palace

Senior career*
| Years | Team | Apps | (Gls) |
| 2015–2016 | Crystal Palace | 0 | (0) |
| 2016 | → Bromley (loan) | 3 | (0) |
| 2017–2018 | Dulwich Hamlet | 27 | (15) |
| 2018–2020 | Coventry City | 5 | (0) |
| 2018 | → Ebbsfleet United (loan) | 4 | (0) |
| 2019 | → Woking (loan) | 12 | (5) |
| 2019 | → Dulwich Hamlet (loan) | 5 | (3) |
| 2020–2021 | Dulwich Hamlet | 13 | (2) |
| 2022 | Dulwich Hamlet | 18 | (2) |
| 2022 | Leatherhead | 8 | (2) |
| 2022–2023 | Wingate & Finchley | 5 | (0) |
| 2023– | Sevenoaks Town | 3 | (0) |

International career
| | England U16 | 3 | (1) |
| | England U17 | 7 | (2) |
- * Club domestic league appearances and goals as of 15:53, 20 April 2023 (UTC)

Reise Malcolm Allassani (born 3 January 1996) is an English professional footballer.

== Career ==
At the age of 17, Allassani signed his first professional contract with Premier League side Crystal Palace, and played for the England U16 team.

In 2016, he joined National League side Bromley on a one-month loan deal.

Following a season with non-league side Dulwich Hamlet, he signed a two-year deal with Coventry City for an undisclosed fee.

Following his release from Coventry City, Allassani re-joined Dulwich Hamlet in September 2020. On 2 January 2022, Allassani returned to Dulwich Hamlet for a fourth spell with the club.

In October 2022, he joined Leatherhead before moving to Wingate & Finchley two months later. He joined Sevenoaks Town in March 2023.

== Personal life ==
Born in England, Allassani is of Ghanaian descent.

== Career statistics ==
As of match played 18 April 2023

Appearances and goals by club, season and competition
| Club | Season | League | | | FA Cup | | League Cup | | Other | | Total | |
| Club | Season | Division | Apps | Goals | Apps | Goals | Apps | Goals | Apps | Goals | Apps | Goals |
|---|---|---|---|---|---|---|---|---|---|---|---|---|
| Crystal Palace | 2015–16 | Premier League | 0 | 0 | 0 | 0 | 0 | 0 | — | | 0 | 0 |
| Bromley (loan) | 2015–16 | National League | 3 | 0 | — | | — | | — | | 3 | 0 |
| Dulwich Hamlet | 2017–18 | Isthmian League Premier Division | 27 | 15 | — | | — | | 4 (Note: Two appearances and two goals in the FA Trophy, two appearances in the Isthmian League Premier Division play-offs) | 2 | 31 | 17 |
| Coventry City | 2018–19 | League One | 5 | 0 | 0 | 0 | 0 | 0 | 1 (Note: Appearance in the EFL Trophy) | 0 | 6 | 0 |
| Coventry City | 2019–20 | League One | 0 | 0 | 0 | 0 | 0 | 0 | 0 | 0 | 0 | 0 |
| Coventry City | Total | | 5 | 0 | 0 | 0 | 0 | 0 | 1 | 0 | 6 | 0 |
| Ebbsfleet United (loan) | 2018–19 | National League | 4 | 0 | 0 | 0 | — | | 0 | 0 | 4 | 0 |
| Woking (loan) | 2018–19 | National League South | 12 | 5 | — | | — | | 2 (Note: Appearances in the National League South play-offs) | 0 | 14 | 5 |
| Dulwich Hamlet (loan) | 2019–20 | National League South | 5 | 3 | 0 | 0 | — | | 0 | 0 | 5 | 3 |
| Dulwich Hamlet | 2020–21 | National League South | 13 | 2 | 2 | 0 | — | | 2 (Note: Appearances in the FA Trophy) | 0 | 17 | 2 |
| Dulwich Hamlet | 2021–22 | National League South | 18 | 2 | — | | — | | — | | 18 | 2 |
| Dulwich Hamlet | Total | | 31 | 4 | 2 | 0 | — | | 2 | 0 | 35 | 4 |
| Leatherhead | 2022–23 | Isthmian League South Central Division | 8 | 2 | — | | — | | 1 (Note: Appearance(s) in Alan Turvey Trophy) | 0 | 9 | 2 |
| Wingate & Finchley | 2022–23 | Isthmian League Premier Division | 5 | 0 | — | | — | | — | | 5 | 0 |
| Sevenoaks Town | 2022–23 | Isthmian League South East Division | 3 | 0 | — | | — | | — | | 3 | 0 |
| Career total | | | 103 | 29 | 2 | 0 | 0 | 0 | 10 | 2 | 115 | 31 |
