= Fraser Preston =

Scottish footballer (born 1999)

Personal information
- Full name: Fraser Thomas Preston
- Date of birth: 5 March 1999 (age 27)
- Position: Forward

Team information
- Current team: Gainsborough Trinity

Youth career
- –2018: Sheffield Wednesday

Senior career*
Years	Team	Apps	(Gls)
2018–2020	Sheffield Wednesday	3	(0)
2020–2022	Boston United	41	(9)
2022	Alfreton Town	16	(2)
2022–	Gainsborough Trinity	21	(3)

International career
2016	Scotland U16	1	(0)
2017	Scotland U19	3	(0)
- * Club domestic league appearances and goals as of 15:40, 14 April 2023 (UTC)

Fraser Preston (born 5 March 1999) is a football player who plays as a forward for Gainsborough Trinity.

== Club career ==
=== Sheffield Wednesday ===
Preston joined the Owls academy at Under-14 level and has worked his way up the ranks impressing at both Under-18 and Under-23 level.

He made his first team debut for Sheffield Wednesday away to Brentford, where he replaced Sam Hutchinson at half time of their Championship defeat.

=== Non-league ===
On 19 September 2020, it was announced Preston had joined Boston United. His first season with Boston United, ended prematurely due to the season being declared null and void following the COVID-19 pandemic and he finished the season with one goal from nine games. On 5 April 2021 he signed for the 2021-22 season at Boston United.

On 8 July 2022, Preston signed for Alfreton Town.

On 15 November 2022, Preston joined Gainsborough Trinity for an undisclosed fee.

== Career statistics ==
As of 18 September 2021

Club	Season	League		FA Cup		League Cup		Other		Total	
Club	Season	App	Goals	App	Goals	App	Goals	App	Goals	App	Goals
Sheffield Wednesday	2018–19	3	0	0	0	1	0	0	0	4	0
Sheffield Wednesday	2019–20	0	0	0	0	0	0	0	0	0	0
Sheffield Wednesday	Total	3	0	0	0	1	0	0	0	4	0
Boston United	2020–21	9	1	1	1	—		1	0	11	2
Boston United	2021–22	32	7	0	0	—		1	0	33	7
Boston United	Total	41	8	1	1	0	0	2	0	44	9
Career Total		15	2	1	1	1	0	1	0	18	3
