= Kyle Finn =

Irish association football player (born 1998)

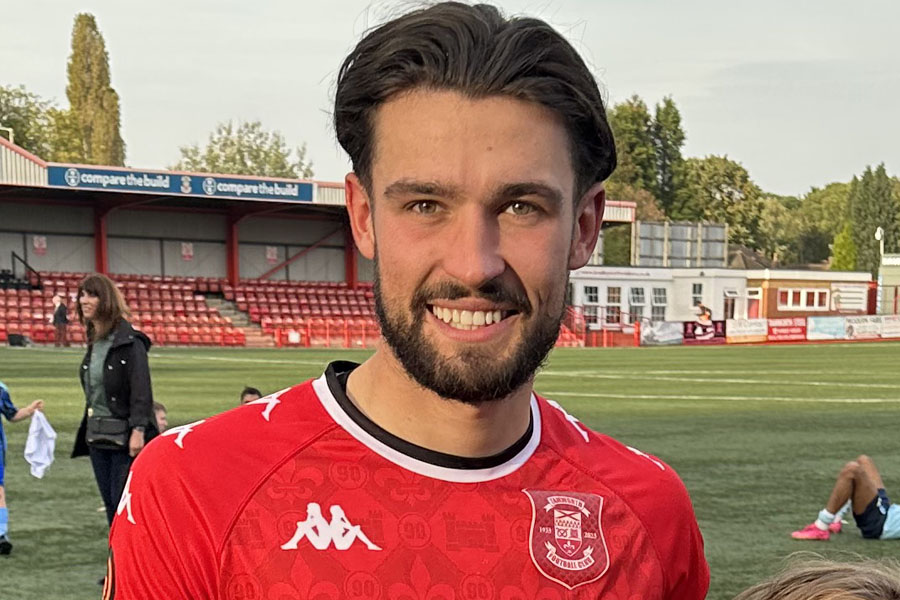
- Finn in October 2023

Personal information
- Full name: Kyle Patrick Finn
- Date of birth: 7 December 1998 (age 27)
- Place of birth: Leamington Spa, England
- Height: 1.79 m (5 ft 10 1/2 in)
- Position: Midfielder

Team information
- Current team: Leamington
- Number: 10

Youth career
- –2017: Coventry City

Senior career*
Years	Team	Apps	(Gls)
2017–2019	Coventry City	0	(0)
2018	→ Tamworth (loan)	11	(2)
2018–2019	→ Hereford (loan)	10	(0)
2019–2021	Hereford	36	(0)
2019	→ Stourbridge (loan)	4	(1)
2019–2020	→ Rushall Olympic (loan)	3	(0)
2021–2022	Halesowen Town	38	(15)
2022–2025	Tamworth	110	(26)
2025–2026	Halesowen Town	39	(3)
2026–	Leamington	0	(0)

International career^{‡}
2015	Republic of Ireland U18	1	(0)
- * Club domestic league appearances and goals as of 22:00, 1 July 2026 (UTC) ‡ National team caps and goals as of 22:00, 1 July 2026 (UTC)

Kyle Patrick Finn (born 7 December 1998) is an Irish footballer who plays as a midfielder for Southern League Premier Division Central side Leamington.

== Playing career ==
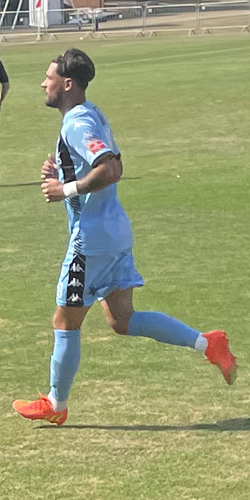
Finn playing for Tamworth in August 2022.

=== Coventry City ===
Finn made his professional debut in a 3–1 EFL Cup loss to Blackburn Rovers on 8 August 2017. Kyle signed a contract extension with the club on 15 March 2018, the new deal would take him to June 2019, with the club holding an option of a further year to take him to June 2020.

==== Tamworth (loan) ====
In August 2018, he moved to Tamworth on a one-month loan deal. A month later, the initial loan was extended by a further four months.

==== Hereford (loan) ====
It was confirmed on 30 October 2018, that Finn made his second loan of the campaign, on this occasion he joined National League North side Hereford on an initial one-month long loan deal after he was recalled from his loan at Tamworth. The loan was extended again for a further month on 6 December.

=== Hereford ===
On 7 January 2019, his move to Hereford was made permanent, with Coventry City retaining a sell-on fee.

==== Stourbridge (loan) ====
He was loaned to Southern League Premier Division Central side Stourbridge on 8 August 2019.

Kyle made his debut for Stourbridge on 10 August 2019 in a Southern League Premier Division Central fixture away at Hitchin Town, Finn scored what proved to be the winning goal in a 2–1 victory.

==== Rushall Olympic (loan) ====
On 11 October 2019, Finn made the loan switch to fellow Southern League Premier Division Central side Rushall Olympic.

=== Halesowen Town ===
Finn joined Northern Premier League Division One Midlands side Halesowen Town on 8 June 2021, he stated that he decided to drop two divisions due to increased work commitments.

Kyle made his debut for Halesowen Town on 14 August 2021 in a Northern Premier League Division One Midlands fixture away at Cambridge City, and proved to be the matchwinner scoring the winning goal in a 2–1 victory.

=== Tamworth ===
On 1 June 2022, Finn re-signed for Southern League Premier Division Central side Tamworth.

Finn made his second debut for Tamworth on 6 August 2022, in a Southern League Premier Division Central fixture at home to Ilkeston Town, with the match finishing 1-1.

On 20 August 2022, Finn scored his first goal of the 2022–23 season in an away fixture against Bedford Town, with the player netting on the 54th minute to give Tamworth a 5–0 lead, with the match finishing 8–1 to Tamworth.

=== Halesowen Town ===
Finn re-signed for Southern League Premier Division Central side Halesowen Town on 21 June 2025.

=== Leamington ===
On 18 May 2026, Finn was announced as the first summer signing for newly relegated Southern League Premier Division Central side Leamington. Kyle made his debut for Leamington on 8 August 2026, in the opening day fixture of the 2026–27 season away at Real Bedford. Finn was named captain and scored, however his new club were defeated by a 4–2 scoreline.

== International career ==
Finn was called up to represent Republic of Ireland U18 in friendly matches against Czech Republic U18, and played in a match on 30 November 2015, starting the game, and being replaced by Trevor Clarke on the 55th minute, with Czech Republic winning the match 3–1.

== Career statistics ==
As of end of 2025–26 season

Appearances and goals by club, season and competition
Club	Season	League			FA Cup		League Cup		Other		Total	
Club	Season	Division	Apps	Goals	Apps	Goals	Apps	Goals	Apps	Goals	Apps	Goals
Coventry City	2017–18	League Two	0	0	0	0	1	0	0	0	1	0
Tamworth (loan)	2018–19	Southern League Premier Division Central	11	2	1	0	—		0	0	12	2
Hereford (loan)	2018–19	National League North	10	0	0	0	—		1 (Note: Appearance(s) in FA Trophy)	0	11	0
Hereford	2018–19	National League North	16	0	0	0	—		1	0	17	0
Hereford	2019–20	National League North	7	0	0	0	—		0	0	7	0
Hereford	2020–21	National League North	13	0	0	0	—		7	1	20	1
Hereford	Total		46	0	0	0	—		9	1	55	1
Stourbridge (loan)	2019–20	Southern League Premier Division Central	4	1	0	0	—		0	0	4	1
Rushall Olympic (loan)	2019–20	Southern League Premier Division Central	3	0	0	0	—		1 (Note: Appearance(s) in Staffordshire Senior Cup)	0	4	0
Halesowen Town	2021–22	Northern Premier League Division One Midlands	38	15	3	0	—		3 (Note: One appearance in FA Trophy, two appearances and one goal in Birmingham Senior Cup)	1	44	16
Tamworth	2022–23	Southern League Premier Division Central	41	10	1	0	—		6 (Note: Five appearances and one goal in FA Trophy, one appearance in Birmingham Senior Cup)	1	48	11
Tamworth	2023–24	National League North	40	14	3	0	—		1	0	44	14
Tamworth	2024–25	National League	29	2	1	0	—		0	0	30	2
Tamworth	Total		110	26	5	0	—		7	1	122	27
Halesowen Town	2025–26	Southern League Premier Division Central	39	3	6	1	—		3 (Note: One appearance in FA Trophy, one appearance in Birmingham Senior Cup, one appearance in Southern League Premier Central Play-Offs)	0	48	4
Leamington	2026–27	Southern League Premier Division Central	0	0	0	0	—		0	0	0	0
Career total			251	47	15	1	1	0	23	3	290	51

== Honours ==
Tamworth

- Southern League Premier Division Central: 2022–23
- National League North: 2023–24
