= 2021–22 Blackburn Rovers F.C. season =

Blackburn Rovers F.C.
2021–22 season
- CEO: Steve Waggott
- Manager: Tony Mowbray
- Stadium: Ewood Park
- Championship: 8th
- FA Cup: Third round
- EFL Cup: First round
- Top goalscorer: League: Ben Brereton Díaz (22); All: Ben Brereton Díaz (22)
| Home colours | Away colours | Third colours |

The 2021–22 season was Blackburn Rovers' 134th season as a professional football club. The club participated in the Championship for a fourth consecutive season. Along with competing in the Championship, the club also participated in the FA Cup and EFL Cup. The season covered the period from 1 July 2021 to 30 June 2022.

== Activity ==
=== Summer activity ===
==== May ====
On 14 May 2021, Rovers announced their retained list, Ryan Nyambe, Joe Rothwell and Joe Rankin-Costello have had the one-year options in their contracts activated. Bradley Johnson has extended his stay by a further 12 months. Discussions are ongoing with club captain Elliott Bennett regarding the possibility of extending his stay, however he is free to consider other options. Harry Chapman has been offered a new contract.

Corry Evans, Charlie Mulgrew, Amari'i Bell, Stewart Downing, Lewis Holtby, Joe Grayson, Stefan Mols, Lewis Thompson, Ben Paton, Brad Lyons and Tom White, along with scholars James Connolly, George Wyatt and Ben Pleavin, have all been informed that they will not be retained by the club when their current contracts/agreements are due to expire on 30 June 2021.

The following players from the development squad Dan Pike, Sam Burn, Sam Barnes, Louie Annesley, Jalil Saadi and Sam Durrant their time with the club has been extended. The following second-year scholars have all been offered their first professional contracts with the club Lennie Cirino, Jared Harlock, Zak Gilsenan, Alex Baker and Aidan Dowling. Joe Ferguson and Brandon Lonsdale have had their scholarships extended into a third year.

On 17 May 2021, Rovers announced a new partnership with kit manufacturers Macron, with a five-year deal agreed to become Official Technical Kit Sponsor and Supplier.

On 18 May 2021, Rovers announced u18 striker Alex Baker had signed his 1st professional contract, a two-year deal until 2023.

On 19 May 2021, Rovers announced u23 striker Sam Burn had signed a new one-year deal until 2022, with the option of a further 12 months.

On 20 May 2021, Rovers announced u18 goalkeeper Aidan Dowling had signed his 1st professional contract, a two-year deal until 2023.

On 21 May 2021, Rovers announced u18 attacker Zak Gilsenan had signed his 1st professional contract, a two-year deal until 2023.

On 22 May 2021, Rovers announced u23 defender Dan Pike had signed a new contract, a two-year deal until 2023, with the option of a 12 month extension.

On 24 May 2021, Rovers announced defender Scott Wharton had signed a new contract, a three-year deal until 2024 with the option of a further 12 months.

On 25 May 2021, Rovers announced u18 midfielder Jared Harlock had signed his 1st professional contract, a two-year deal until 2023.

On 27 May 2021, Rovers announced u23 defender Lenni Cirino had signed his 1st professional contract, a two-year deal until 2023.

On 29 May 2021, Brentford were promoted to the Premier League by way of the EFL Championship play-offs. With David Raya's promotion as a result activating a promotion bonus in which Rovers stood to gain £2 million.

==== June ====
On 3 June 2021, Rovers announced u23 midfielder Jake Garrett had signed a new long-term contract, a four-year deal until 2025.

On 4 June 2021, Rovers announced midfielder Joe Rankin-Costello had signed a new long-term contract, a three-year deal until 2024.

On 8 June 2021, Barrow announced the signing of Tom White following his release from Rovers.

On 14 June 2021, Rovers announced u23 goalkeeper Joe Hilton had signed a new contract, a two-year deal until 2023.

On 15 June 2021, Dundee United announced the signing of Charlie Mulgrew following his release from Rovers, Also Rovers announced u23 defender Louie Annesley signed a new two-year deal until 2023.

On 17 June 2021, Rovers announced midfielder Elliott Bennett will join Shrewsbury Town, Also Kilmarnock announced the signing of Brad Lyons following his release from Rovers.

On 23 June 2021, Barrow announced the signing of Joe Grayson following his release from Rovers.

On 24 June 2022, Cardiff City announced the signing of James Connolly following his release from Rovers.

On 25 June 2021, Luton Town announced the signing of Amari'i Bell following his release from Rovers.

On 28 June 2021, Rovers announced u23 goalkeeper Joe Hilton had joined Hamilton Academical on loan until the end of the season.

On 29 June 2021, Rovers announced midfielder Harry Chapman had signed a new 12-month contract until 2022.

On 30 June 2021, Rovers announced u23 defender Sam Barnes had signed a new two-year deal until 2023.

==== July ====
On 9 July 2021, Accrington Stanley announced the signing of Ben Pleavin following his release from Rovers. Also Rovers announced u23 midfielder Sam Durrant had signed a new one-year contract until 2022.

On 15 July 2021, Sunderland announced the signing of Corry Evans following his release from Rovers.

On 16 July 2021, Scunthorpe United announced the signing of Lewis Thompson following his release from Rovers, Rovers also announced the appointment of John Park as the club's new Head of Recruitment.

==== August ====
On 1 August 2021, Salford City announced the appointment of Rovers u23 manager Billy Barr as their assistant manager. Also Stoke City announced the appointment of Rovers head of Academy recruitment Simon Cooper in a similar role. Also Stewart Downing announced his retirement from football.

On 6 August 2021, Ross County announced the signing of Ben Paton following his release from Rovers.

On 10 August 2021, Rovers announced striker Adam Armstrong had joined Southampton for a significant undisclosed fee.

On 16 August 2021, Rovers announced the signing of midfielder Leighton Clarkson on loan from Liverpool until the end of the season.

On 17 August 2021, Holstein Kiel announced the signing of Lewis Holtby following his release from Rovers in the summer.

On 18 August 2021, Rovers announced defender Hayden Carter had signed a new contract, a three-year deal until 2024, with the option of a 12 month extension.

On 20 August 2021, Rovers announced u23 goalkeeper Aidan Dowling had joined FC Halifax Town on a one-month loan.

On 23 August 2021, Rovers announced the signing of attacking midfielder Ian Poveda on loan from Leeds United until the end of the season.

On 29 August 2021, Rovers announced the signing of defender Jan Paul van Hecke on loan from Brighton & Hove Albion until the end of the season.

On 31 August 2021, Rovers announced the signing of winger Reda Khadra on loan from Brighton & Hove Albion until the end of the season, Rovers also announced the signing of defender Tayo Edun from Lincoln City for an undisclosed fee on a three-year deal, with the option of a further 12 months, Rovers also announced midfielder Harry Chapman had joined Burton Albion on a 6 month loan until 2 January.

==== September ====
On 3 September 2021, Rovers announced the appointment of Mike Sheron as u23 head coach making the step up from u18s.

On 4 September 2021, Rovers announced the appointment of Ryan Kidd as u18 head coach.

On 9 September 2021, Rovers announced defender Dan Pike had joined AFC Fylde on a month's loan until 9 October, Rovers also announced forward Jack Vale had joined FC Halifax Town until 2 January 2022.

==== October ====
On 2 October 2021, Ramsbottom United announced the signing of George Wyatt following his release from Rovers in the summer.

On 9 October 2021, Rovers announced u23 goalkeeper Aidan Dowling had joined Lancaster City on a month's loan until 6 November.

On 12 October 2021, Warrington Town announced the signing of Stefan Mols following his release from Rovers in the summer.

On 16 October 2021, Rovers announced u23 forward Sam Burns had joined FC United on a month's loan until 13 November.

On 22 October 2021, Rovers announced u18 forward Brandon Lonsdale had joined Lancaster City on a month's loan until 20 November.

On 28 October 2021, Rovers announced u18 defender George Pratt had joined Hyde United on loan until 27 November.

On 29 October 2021, Rovers announced u23 defender Louie Annesley had joined Woking on loan until 4 December.

==== November ====
On 25 November 2021, Rovers announced the return of Chris Samba as an academy coach.

On 26 November 2021, Rovers announced u18 forward Brandon Lonsdale had joined Macclesfield on a short-term loan until 3 January.

=== Winter activity ===
==== December ====
On 8 December 2021, Rovers announced u18 striker Harry Leonard had signed his 1st professional contract, a long-term deal until 2025.

On 21 December 2021, Rovers announced defender Dan Pike had rejoined AFC Fylde on a month's loan until 16 January.

==== January ====
On 1 January 2022, Rovers announced forward Sam Gallagher had signed a new two-year contract until 2024, with the option of a 12 month extension.

On 2 January 2022, Rovers announced that Leighton Clarkson had returned to Liverpool.

On 4 January 2022, Rovers announced that u23 forward Sam Burns had joined Scunthorpe United until the end of the season.

On 5 January 2022, Rovers announced u23 defender Louie Annesley had extended his stay at Woking until 15 May 2022.

On 6 January 2022, Rovers announced the signing of Irish right back James Brown from Drogheda United on a free transfer following a successful trial.

On 14 January 2022, Rovers announced the signing of Dutch right back Deyovaisio Zeefuik from Hertha Berlin on loan, with a view to making the deal permanent at the end of the season.

On 15 January 2022, Rovers announced that defender Hayden Carter had joined Portsmouth until the end of the season.

On 18 January 2022, Rovers announced the signing of Dilan Markanday from Tottenham Hotspur on a 3 1/2-year deal, with the option of a further 12 months, for an undisclosed fee. Also Rovers announced defender Tyler Magloire had joined Northampton Town until the end of the season. Rovers also announced that Totally Wicked will be the new shirt sponsor for the rest of the season after the partnership with Recoverite Compression ended with immediate effect.

On 30 January 2022, Rovers announced the signing of Ryan Hedges from Aberdeen on a 3 1/2-year deal, with the option of a further 12 months, for an undisclosed fee.

On 31 January 2022, Rovers announced u23 attacker Connor McBride had joined Queens Park until the end of the season. Rovers also announced midfielder Harry Chapman had re-joined Burton Albion until the end of the season. Rovers also announced that attacker Daniel Butterworth had joined Fleetwood Town until the end of the season. Also Rovers announced the signing of English midfielder Ryan Giles from Wolverhampton Wanderers on loan until the end of the season.

==== February ====
On 11 February 2022, Rovers announced goalkeeper Thomas Kaminski had signed a new 3 1/2-year contract until 2025.

On 14 February 2022, Rovers announced u23 midfielder Adam Wharton had signed his first professional contract, a 2 1/2-year contract until 2024, with the option of a further 12 months.

==== March ====
On 2 March 2022, Rovers announced defender James Brown who initially joined on a 6-month deal had signed a new contract until 2024, with the option of a further 12 months.

==== April ====
On 24 April 2022, Rovers announced that the club have won the Diversity Award at this year's EFL Awards.

==== May ====
On 1 May 2022, Rovers announced u23 forward Sam Burns had signed a new one-year contract until 2023.

On 3 May 2022, Rovers announced their end-of-season award winners Jan Paul van Hecke was voted Player of the Year, Reda Khadra's goal against QPR was voted Goal of the Season, John Buckley won Young Player of the Year, Ben Brereton won both Players Player of the Year and Junior Rovers Player of the Year, Darragh Lenihan was awarded a Special Club award, Sam Gallagher was awarded the Man of the Match award, Lewis Travis was awarded a Team Contribution award & Scott Wharton was awarded an Unsung Hero award.

== Squad information ==
Players and squad numbers last updated on 16 March 2022. List is representative of players who have made an appearance for the first-team this season and of information available on Rovers.co.uk.

Note: Flags indicate national team as has been defined under FIFA eligibility rules. Players may hold more than one non-FIFA nationality.

| No. | Pos. | Nat. | Name | Date of birth & age | Year joined | Contract expires | Joined from | Other |
Goalkeepers
| 1 | GK | (Belgium) | Thomas Kaminski | 23 October 1992 (age 34) | 2020 | 2025 | (Belgium) Gent | |
| 13 | GK | (England) | Aynsley Pears | 23 April 1998 (age 28) | 2020 | 2024 | (England) Middlesbrough | |
Defenders
| 5 | DF | (Spain) | Daniel Ayala | 7 November 1990 (age 36) | 2020 | 2023 | (England) Middlesbrough | |
| 24 | DF | (England) | Hayden Carter | 17 December 1999 (age 26) | 2014 | 2024 | Academy | Option for 12 month extension. On loan at Portsmouth |
| 26 | DF | (Republic of Ireland) | Darragh Lenihan | 16 March 1994 (age 32) | 2011 | 2022 | Academy | |
| 36 | DF | (England) | Tyler Magloire | 21 December 1998 (age 27) | 2019 | 2022 | Academy | On loan at Northampton Town |
| 2 | DF | (Namibia) | Ryan Nyambe | 4 December 1997 (age 28) | 2011 | 2022 | Academy | |
| 3 | DF | (England) | Harry Pickering | 29 December 1998 (age 27) | 2021 | 2025 | (England) Crewe Alexandra | |
| 25 | DF | (Netherlands) | Jan Paul van Hecke | 8 June 2000 (age 26) | 2021 | 2022 | (England) Brighton & Hove Albion | On loan from Brighton & Hove Albion |
| 16 | DF | (England) | Scott Wharton | 3 October 1997 (age 29) | 2010 | 2024 | Academy | Option for 12-month extension. |
| 42 | DF | (Netherlands) | Deyovaisio Zeefuik | 11 March 1998 (age 28) | 2022 | 2022 | (Germany) Hertha Berlin | On loan from Hertha Berlin, option to purchase at end of season |
Midfielders
| 21 | MF | (England) | John Buckley | 13 October 1999 (age 27) | 2006 | 2024 | Academy | Option for 12-month extension. |
| 17 | MF | (England) | Harry Chapman | 5 November 1997 (age 29) | 2019 | 2022 | (England) Middlesbrough | On loan at Burton Albion |
| 23 | MF | (England) | Bradley Dack | 31 December 1993 (age 32) | 2017 | 2023 | (England) Gillingham | Option for 12-month extension. |
| 6 | MF | (England) | Jacob Davenport | 28 December 1998 (age 27) | 2018 | 2022 | (England) Manchester City | |
| 20 | MF | (England) | Tayo Edun | 14 May 1998 (age 28) | 2021 | 2024 | (England) Lincoln City | Option for 12 month extension. |
| 28 | MF | (England) | Ryan Giles | 26 January 2000 (age 26) | 2022 | 2022 | (England) Wolverhampton Wanderers | On loan from Wolverhampton Wanderers |
| 19 | MF | (Wales) | Ryan Hedges | 8 July 1995 (age 31) | 2022 | 2025 | (Scotland) Aberdeen | Option for 12-month extension. |
| 4 | MF | (England) | Bradley Johnson | 28 April 1987 (age 39) | 2019 | 2022 | (England) Derby County | |
| 11 | MF | (England) | Joe Rankin-Costello | 26 July 1999 (age 27) | 2014 | 2024 | Academy | |
| 8 | MF | (England) | Joe Rothwell | 11 January 1995 (age 31) | 2018 | 2022 | (England) Oxford United | |
| 27 | MF | (England) | Lewis Travis | 16 October 1997 (age 29) | 2014 | 2026 | Academy | |
Forwards
| 22 | FW | (Chile) | Ben Brereton Diaz | 18 April 1999 (age 27) | 2018 | 2022 | (England) Nottingham Forest | Option for 12-month extension. |
| 14 | FW | (England) | Daniel Butterworth | 14 September 1999 (age 27) | 2016 | 2022 | Academy | On at Fleetwood Town |
| 10 | FW | (England) | Tyrhys Dolan | 28 December 2001 (age 24) | 2020 | 2024 | (England) Preston North End | Option for 12-month extension. |
| 9 | FW | (England) | Sam Gallagher | 15 September 1995 (age 31) | 2019 | 2024 | (England) Southampton | Option for 12-month extension. |
| 7 | FW | (Germany) | Reda Khadra | 4 July 2001 (age 25) | 2021 | 2022 | (England) Brighton & Hove Albion | On loan from Brighton & Hove Albion |
| 18 | FW | (England) | Dilan Markanday | 20 August 2001 (age 25) | 2022 | 2025 | (England) Tottenham Hotspur | Option for 12-month extension. |
| 30 | FW | (England) | Ian Poveda | 9 February 2000 (age 26) | 2021 | 2022 | (England) Leeds United | On loan from Leeds United |
| 37 | FW | (Wales) | Jack Vale | 3 March 2001 (age 25) | 2017 | 2023 | Academy | |

=== Other players ===
Players and squad numbers last updated on 16 March 2022. List below includes players that have been issued a squad number for the 2021-22 season but haven't made an appearance for the first-team and aren't listed as part of the first-team setup on Rovers.co.uk.

Note: Flags indicate national team as has been defined under FIFA eligibility rules. Players may hold more than one non-FIFA nationality.

| No. | Pos. | Nat. | Name | Date of birth & age | Year joined | Contract expires | Joined from | Other |
Goalkeepers
| 45 | GK | (England) | Jordan Eastham | 8 September 2001 (age 25) | 2016 | 2022 | Academy | |
| 41 | GK | (Greece) | Antonis Stergiakis | 16 March 1999 (age 27) | 2020 | 2023 | (Bulgaria) Slavia Sofia | Option for 12-month extension. |
Defenders
| 15 | DF | (Republic of Ireland) | James Brown | 4 June 1998 (age 28) | 2022 | 2024 | (Republic of Ireland) Drogheda United | Option for 12 month extension. |
| 33 | DF | (England) | Lenni Cirino | 25 January 2003 (age 23) | 2017 | 2023 | Academy | |
| 39 | DF | (England) | Ashley Phillips | 26 June 2005 (age 21) | 2017 | | Academy | |
| 34 | DF | (England) | Daniel Pike | 1 September 2002 (age 24) | 2010 | 2023 | Academy | |
Midfielders
| 35 | MF | (England) | Jake Garrett | 10 March 2003 (age 23) | 2013 | 2025 | Academy | |
| 40 | MF | (England) | Adam Wharton | 2 June 2004 (age 22) | 2010 | 2024 | Academy | Option for 12 months extension |
Forwards
| 32 | FW | (Scotland) | Connor McBride | 20 January 2001 (age 25) | 2020 | 2022 | (Scotland) Celtic | Option for 12 month extension. On loan at Queens Park |

== Pre-season ==
Blackburn Rovers confirmed they would play friendlies against AFC Fylde, Bradford City, Leeds United and Bolton Wanderers as part of their pre-season preparations.

| 10 July 2021 Friendly | AFC Fylde | 0–1 | Blackburn Rovers | Medlar-with-Wesham |
| 15:00 BST | | Report | 74' McBride | Stadium: Mill Farm |

| 17 July 2021 Friendly | Everton | 1–0 | Blackburn Rovers | Halewood |
| 13:00 BST | Gbamin 36' | Report | | Stadium: Finch Farm; Attendance: 0 (Behind-closed-doors) |

| 24 July 2021 Friendly | Bradford City | 2–0 | Blackburn Rovers | Bradford |
| 15:00 BST | Angol 19' (pen.); Cooke 57' | Report | | Stadium: Utilita Energy Stadium; Attendance: 1,660; Referee: Andy Haines |

| 28 July 2021 Friendly | Blackburn Rovers | 1–1 | Leeds United | Blackburn |
| 19:30 BST | McBride 73' | Report | 81' Struijk | Stadium: Ewood Park |

| 31 July 2021 Friendly | Bolton Wanderers | 2–2 | Blackburn Rovers | Horwich |
| 15:00 BST | Johnston 28'; Carter 51' (o.g.) | Report | 68', 72'Brereton | Stadium: University of Bolton Stadium |

== Competitions ==
=== Championship ===
==== League table ====
| Pos | Team | Pld | W | D | L | GF | GA | GD | Pts | Promotion, qualification or relegation |
|---|---|---|---|---|---|---|---|---|---|---|
| 5 | Sheffield United | 46 | 21 | 12 | 13 | 63 | 45 | +18 | 75 | Qualification for Championship play-offs |
| 6 | Luton Town | 46 | 21 | 12 | 13 | 63 | 55 | +8 | 75 | Qualification for Championship play-offs |
| 7 | Middlesbrough | 46 | 20 | 10 | 16 | 59 | 50 | +9 | 70 | |
| 8 | Blackburn Rovers | 46 | 19 | 12 | 15 | 59 | 50 | +9 | 69 | |
| 9 | Millwall | 46 | 18 | 15 | 13 | 53 | 45 | +8 | 69 | |
| 10 | West Bromwich Albion | 46 | 18 | 13 | 15 | 52 | 45 | +7 | 67 | |
| 11 | Queens Park Rangers | 46 | 19 | 9 | 18 | 60 | 59 | +1 | 66 | |

Source: EFL Official Website
Rules for classification: 1) Points; 2) Goal difference; 3) Number of goals scored; 4) Head-to-head results; 5) Wins; 6) Away goals; 7) Penalty points (sec 9.5); 8) 12-point sending off offences

==== Results summary ====
| Overall | | | | | | | | Home | | | | | | Away | | | | | |
| Pld | W | D | L | GF | GA | GD | Pts | W | D | L | GF | GA | GD | W | D | L | GF | GA | GD |
|---|---|---|---|---|---|---|---|---|---|---|---|---|---|---|---|---|---|---|---|
| 46 | 19 | 12 | 15 | 59 | 50 | +9 | 69 | 12 | 5 | 6 | 36 | 26 | +10 | 7 | 7 | 9 | 23 | 24 | −1 |

Last updated: 7 May 2022.

==== Results by matchday ====
| Matchday | 1 | 2 | 3 | 4 | 5 | 6 | 7 | 8 | 9 | 10 | 11 | 12 | 13 | 14 | 15 | 16 | 17 | 18 | 19 | 20 | 21 | 22 | 23 | 24 | 25 | 26 | 27 | 28 | 29 | 30 | 31 | 32 | 33 | 34 | 35 | 36 | 37 | 38 | 39 | 40 | 41 | 42 | 43 | 44 | 45 | 46 |
|---|---|---|---|---|---|---|---|---|---|---|---|---|---|---|---|---|---|---|---|---|---|---|---|---|---|---|---|---|---|---|---|---|---|---|---|---|---|---|---|---|---|---|---|---|---|---|
| Ground | H | A | A | H | A | H | H | A | H | A | A | H | A | H | A | H | H | A | H | A | H | A | H | H | H | A | A | H | A | A | H | A | A | H | A | A | H | H | A | A | H | A | H | A | H | A |
| Result | W | D | W | L | D | D | W | D | W | L | L | D | L | W | W | L | W | D | W | W | W | W | W | W | D | W | L | W | D | L | L | D | L | W | L | D | L | W | L | D | D | L | L | W | L | W |
| Position | 4 | 8 | 6 | 9 | 10 | 10 | 8 | 6 | 6 | 6 | 8 | 9 | 13 | 12 | 7 | 12 | 7 | 8 | 7 | 4 | 4 | 4 | 3 | 3 | 3 | 3 | 3 | 2 | 2 | 2 | 2 | 3 | 5 | 4 | 5 | 4 | 5 | 5 | 6 | 6 | 7 | 8 | 8 | 7 | 9 | 8 |

Updated to match(es) played on 7 May 2022. Source: EFL
A = Away; H = Home; W = Win; D = Draw; L = Loss

==== Matches ====
Rovers fixtures were announced on 24 June 2021.

| 7 August 2021 1 | Blackburn Rovers | 2–1 | Swansea City | Blackburn |
| 15:00 BST | Gallagher 36'; Brereton 48' (pen.) | Report | 52' Paterson | Stadium: Ewood Park; Attendance: 10,260; Referee: David Webb |

| 14 August 2021 2 | Millwall | 1–1 | Blackburn Rovers | Bermondsey |
| 15:00 BST | Wallace 64' | Report | 76' Brereton | Stadium: The Den; Attendance: 12,490; Referee: Andy Davies |

| 18 August 2021 3 | Nottingham Forest | 1–2 | Blackburn Rovers | West Bridgford |
| 19:45 BST | Colback (yellow card) 54'; Zinckernagel 69'; Lawrence-Gabriel (yellow card) 85' (yellow-red card) 90' | Report | 47' Ayala; (yellow card) 66' Gallagher; (yellow card) 71' Carter; 86' Lenihan; (yellow card) 90+2' Brereton | Stadium: The City Ground; Attendance: 24,850; Referee: Gavin Ward |

| 21 August 2021 4 | Blackburn Rovers | 1–2 | West Bromwich Albion | Blackburn |
| 15:00 BST | Brereton 51'; Travis (yellow card) 58' | Report | 1' Mowatt; (yellow card) 18' Livermore; 45+4' Phillips; (yellow card) 81' Furlong | Stadium: Ewood Park; Attendance: 11,926; Referee: Tony Harrington |

| 28 August 2021 5 | Middlesbrough | 1–1 | Blackburn Rovers | Middlesbrough |
| 15:00 BST | Howson 36'; Morsy (red card) 10'; Olusanya (yellow card) 87' | Report | 17' Gallagher; (yellow card) 19' (yellow-red card) 79' Carter; (yellow card) 87' Travis; (yellow card) 90+4' Dolan | Stadium: Riverside Stadium; Referee: Michael Salisbury |

| 11 September 2021 6 | Blackburn Rovers | 2–2 | Luton Town | Blackburn |
| 15:00 BST | Lenihan (yellow card) 8'; Dolan 27', (yellow card) 48'; Pickering 31'; Brereton (yellow card) 49'; Gallagher (yellow card) 67' | Report | (yellow card) 36' Naismith; (yellow card) 49' Sluga; (yellow card) 50' Jerome; (yellow card) 59' Osho; (yellow card) 61' Lansbury; 73', 90+8' Berry | Stadium: Ewood Park; Attendance: 11,241; Referee: Oliver Langford |

| 14 September 2021 7 | Blackburn Rovers | 2–0 | Hull City | Blackburn |
| 19:45 BST | Ayala 61'; Brereton 65'; Pickering (yellow card) 74' | Report | (yellow card) 59' Elder; (yellow card) 79' Bernard | Stadium: Ewood Park; Attendance: 9,140; Referee: John Brooks |

| 18 September 2021 8 | Barnsley | 0–0 | Blackburn Rovers | Barnsley |
| 15:00 BST | | Report | (yellow card) 47' Dolan | Stadium: Oakwell; Attendance: 13,640; Referee: Andy Woolmer |

| 25 September 2021 9 | Blackburn Rovers | 5–1 | Cardiff City | Blackburn |
| 15:00 BST | Gallagher 24'; Brereton 32', 45+2', 90' (pen.); Dolan 53' | Report | (yellow card) 8' Flint; 58' Morrison; (yellow card) 89' Phillips | Stadium: Ewood Park; Attendance: 11,670; Referee: Keith Stroud |

| 28 September 2021 10 | Huddersfield Town | 3–2 | Blackburn Rovers | Huddersfield |
| 19:45 BST | Vallejo 36'; Ward 60', 84'; Sarr (yellow card) 63'; Nicholls (yellow card) 90+3' | Report | 57', 65' (pen.) Brereton | Stadium: John Smith's Stadium; Referee: Jeremy Simpson |

| 2 October 2021 11 | Blackpool | 2–1 | Blackburn Rovers | Blackpool |
| 15:00 GMT | Lavery 4'; Yates 24'; Ekpiteta (yellow card) 46'; Wintle (yellow card) 87'; Bowler (yellow card) 90+5' | Report | (yellow card) 25' Ayala; 50' Brereton | Stadium: Bloomfield Road; Attendance: 13,419; Referee: Josh Smith |

| 16 October 2021 12 | Blackburn Rovers | 2–2 | Coventry City | Blackburn |
| 15:00 BST | Buckley (yellow card) 28'; Rothwell 39'; Gallagher 45'; van Hecke (yellow card) 73' | Report | 62' Walker; 68' (o.g.) Kaminski; (yellow card) 79' Kane; (yellow card) 90+4' Hamer | Stadium: Ewood Park; Attendance: 14,110; Referee: Matt Donohue |

| 19 October 2021 13 | Queens Park Rangers | 1–0 | Blackburn Rovers | Shepherd's Bush |
| 19:45 BST | Dickie (yellow card) 28'; Chair 83'; Amos (yellow card) 90+4' | Report | (yellow card) 45+1' Clarkson; (yellow card) 50' Butterworth; (yellow card) 55' Rothwell | Stadium: Kiyan Prince Foundation Stadium; Referee: David Webb |

| 23 October 2021 14 | Blackburn Rovers | 2–0 | Reading | Blackburn |
| 15:00 BST | Buckley (yellow card) 38'; Gallagher 61'; Dolan 64'; van Hecke (yellow card) 72'; Poveda (yellow card) 79'; Johnson (yellow card) 90+1' | Report | (yellow card) 56' Swift; (yellow card) 90+2' Drinkwater | Stadium: Ewood Park; Attendance: 10,517; Referee: Tony Harrington |

| 30 October 2021 15 | Derby County | 1–2 | Blackburn Rovers | Derby |
| 15:00 BST | Shinnie (yellow card) 29'; Lawrence (yellow card) 50'; Davies 89' | Report | 8', 20' Brereton; (yellow card) 59' Lenihan; (yellow card) 86' Buckley; (yellow card) 88' Khadra; (yellow card) 89' Poveda; (yellow card) 90+2' Travis | Stadium: Pride Park; Referee: Steve Martin |

| 2 November 2021 16 | Blackburn Rovers | 0–7 | Fulham | Blackburn |
| 19:45 GMT | van Hecke (red card) 30'; Edun (yellow card) 74' | Report | 6', 79' Kebano; 19' Mitrović; 54', 58' Wilson; 81', 90+1' Muniz | Stadium: Ewood Park; Attendance: 9,326; Referee: Jarred Gillett |

| 6 November 2021 17 | Blackburn Rovers | 3–1 | Sheffield United | Blackburn |
| 15:00 GMT | Khadra 37'; Brereton 59'; Poveda 70'; Lenihan (yellow card) 76' | Report | 2' Brewster; (yellow card) 5' Bogle; (yellow card) 24' Fleck; (yellow card) 80' Norwood | Stadium: Ewood Park; Attendance: 17,291; Referee: Oliver Langford |

| 20 November 2021 18 | Bristol City | 1–1 | Blackburn Rovers | Bristol |
| 15:00 GMT | O'Dowda 34'; Williams (yellow card) 71'; Massengo (yellow card) 74' Lenihan (yellow card) 76' | Report | (yellow card) 33' Nyambe; 75' Brereton; (yellow card) 82' Rothwell | Stadium: Ashton Gate; Referee: John Busby |

| 24 November 2021 19 | Blackburn Rovers | 4–0 | Peterborough United | Blackburn |
| 19:45 GMT | Pickering 16'; Brereton 35', 60', (yellow card) 53'; Lenihan 45' | Report | (yellow card) 44' Beevers; (yellow card) 71' Edwards | Stadium: Ewood Park; Attendance: 9,038; Referee: John Brooks |

| 27 November 2021 20 | Stoke City | 0–1 | Blackburn Rovers | Stoke-on-Trent |
| 15:00 GMT | Brown (yellow card) 60'; Davies (yellow card) 74'; Chester (yellow card) 75'; Wilmot (yellow card) 90' | Report | 52' Khadra; (yellow card) 74' Dolan; (yellow card) 81' Nyambe; (yellow card) 89' Pickering; (yellow card) 90+1' Brereton | Stadium: Bet365 Stadium; Attendance: 21,739; Referee: Tim Robinson |

| 4 December 2021 21 | Blackburn Rovers | 1–0 | Preston North End | Blackburn |
| 15:00 GMT | Lenihan (yellow card) 15'; Brereton 53'; van Hecke (yellow card) 65'; Travis (yellow card) 68' | Report | (yellow card) 65' Riis Jakobsen; (yellow card) 83' Evans | Stadium: Ewood Park; Attendance: 18,487; Referee: Gavin Ward |

| 11 December 2021 22 | Bournemouth | 0–2 | Blackburn Rovers | Kings Park |
| 15:00 GMT | L. Cook (yellow card) 38'; Stacey (yellow card) 54'; Marcondes (yellow card) 62' | Report | 21' (o.g.) Pearson; (yellow card) 42' Brereton; 65', (yellow card) 86' van Hecke; (yellow card) 90+1' Buckley | Stadium: Vitality Stadium; Attendance: 10,064; Referee: Simon Hooper |

| 18 December 2021 23 | Blackburn Rovers | 4–0 | Birmingham City | Blackburn |
| 15:00 GMT | Buckley 6', (yellow card) 41'; Khadra 52'; Brereton 60' (pen.), 79' | Report | Šunjić (yellow card) 43' | Stadium: Ewood Park; Attendance: 12,148; Referee: Geoff Eltringham |

| 29 December 2021 24 | Blackburn Rovers | 2–1 | Barnsley | Blackburn |
| 19:45 GMT | Rothwell 24'; Brereton Díaz 65'; Lenihan (yellow card) 67'; Gallagher (yellow card) 83'; Kaminski (yellow card) 88' | Report | Morris 45+1'; Benson (yellow card) 64' | Stadium: Ewood Park; Attendance: 14,228; Referee: Dean Whitestone |

| 2 January 2022 25 | Blackburn Rovers | 0–0 | Huddersfield Town | Blackburn |
| 14:00 GMT | Travis (yellow card) 33'; Buckley (yellow card) 39' van Hecke (yellow card) 84' | Report | High (yellow card) 14'; Holmes (yellow card) 80' | Stadium: Ewood Park; Attendance: 16,313; Referee: Keith Stroud |

| 15 January 2022 26 | Cardiff City | 0–1 | Blackburn Rovers | Leckwith |
| 12:30 GMT | Drameh (yellow card) 41'; Ng (yellow card) 59'; Collins (yellow card) 72'; Pack (yellow card) 90+5' | Report | Rothwell 14' van Hecke (yellow card) 42'; Travis (yellow card) 50'; Lenihan (yellow card) 55'; Nyambe (yellow card) 59' (yellow-red card) 76'; Wharton (yellow card) 76'; Kaminski (yellow card) 90+2' | Stadium: Cardiff City Stadium; Referee: Matt Donohue |

| 19 January 2022 27 | Hull City | 2–0 | Blackburn Rovers | Kingston upon Hull |
| 19:45 GMT | Honeyman 8'; Eaves 67' | Report | Rothwell (yellow card) 81'; Lenihan (yellow card) 88'; Brereton Díaz (yellow card) 90+5' | Stadium: MKM Stadium; Attendance: 13,950; Referee: Thomas Bramall |

| 24 January 2022 28 | Blackburn Rovers | 1–0 | Middlesbrough | Blackburn |
| 19:45 GMT | Nyambe (yellow card) 37'; Travis (yellow card) 50'; Gallagher 67'; Wharton (yellow card) 81'; Edun (yellow card) 90+11' | Report | Taylor (yellow card) 4'; Crooks (yellow card) 15'; Connolly (yellow card) 26'; Tavernier (yellow card) 29'; McNair (yellow card) 90+3'; Jones (yellow card) 90+9' | Stadium: Ewood Park; Attendance: 14,670; Referee: Darren England |

| 29 January 2022 28 | Luton Town | 0–0 | Blackburn Rovers | Luton |
| 15:00 GMT | Bree (yellow card) 29'; Lockyer (yellow card) 47'; Cornick (yellow card) 90+6' | Report | Van Hecke (yellow card) 28'; Kaminski (yellow card) 90+6' | Stadium: Kenilworth Road; Attendance: 9,987; Referee: James Linington |

| 5 February 2022 30 | Swansea City | 1–0 | Blackburn Rovers | Landore |
| 17:30 GMT | Obafemi 16'; Ntcham (yellow card) 37'; Manning (yellow card) 38' (yellow-red card) 53'; Christie (yellow card) 90+2' | Report | Rothwell (yellow card) 24'; Buckley (yellow card) 33' | Stadium: Swansea.com Stadium; Attendance: 16,933; Referee: Tim Robinson |

| 9 February 2022 31 | Blackburn Rovers | 0–2 | Nottingham Forest | Blackburn |
| 19:45 GMT | Buckley (yellow card) 18'; Lenihan (yellow card) 40' (yellow-red card) 53'; Rothwell (yellow card) 50'; Brereton Díaz (yellow card) 59' | Report | Garner 22', (yellow card) 69'; Colback (yellow card) 31'; Surridge (yellow card) 87'; Johnson 90' (pen.) | Stadium: Ewood Park; Attendance: 13,869; Referee: Josh Smith |

| 14 February 2022 32 | West Bromwich Albion | 0–0 | Blackburn Rovers | West Bromwich |
| 20:00 GMT | | Report | Rankin-Costello (yellow card) 41' | Stadium: The Hawthorns; Attendance: 20,680; Referee: John Brooks |

| 23 February 2022 33 | Sheffield United | 1–0 | Blackburn Rovers | Sheffield |
| 19:45 GMT | Egan (yellow card) 29'; Gibbs-White (yellow card) 56'; Berge (yellow card) 58'; Goode (red card) 66'; Davies 90+2' | Report | Rothwell (yellow card) 26'; Travis (yellow card) 67'; Khadra (penalty missed) 72' | Stadium: Bramall Lane; Attendance: 26,495; Referee: Matt Donohue |

| 26 February 2022 34 | Blackburn Rovers | 1–0 | Queens Park Rangers | Blackburn |
| 12:30 GMT | Khadra 77'; Travis (yellow card) 84'; Kaminski (yellow card) 89'; Wharton (yellow card) 90+1' | Report | Field (yellow card) 6'; Chair (yellow card) 90+2' | Stadium: Ewood Park; Attendance: 14,293; Referee: Jeremy Simpson |

| 5 March 2022 35 | Fulham | 2–0 | Blackburn Rovers | Fulham |
| 12:30 GMT | Kebano 25'; Wilson 35'; Williams (yellow card) 64'; Ream (yellow card) 80' | Report | Dolan (yellow card) 35'; Lenihan (yellow card) 87' | Stadium: Craven Cottage; Referee: David Webb |

| 8 March 2022 36 | Blackburn Rovers | 0–0 | Millwall | Blackburn |
| 19:45 GMT | van Hecke (yellow card) 90' | Report | Cooper (yellow card) 41'; Wallace (yellow card) 67'; Saville (yellow card) 73' | Stadium: Ewood Park; Attendance: 12,874; Referee: Geoff Eltringham |

| 12 March 2022 37 | Blackburn Rovers | 0–1 | Bristol City | Blackburn |
| 15:00 GMT | Khadra (yellow card) 49'; Dack (penalty missed) 83' | Report | Scott (yellow card) 26'; Bentley (yellow card) 87'; Weimann (yellow card) 88', (goal) 90+2' | Stadium: Ewood Park; Attendance: 13,567; Referee: Gavin Ward |

| 15 March 2022 38 | Blackburn Rovers | 3–1 | Derby County | Blackburn |
| 19:45 GMT | Wharton 53'; Dolan 59'; Travis (yellow card) 83'; Gallagher 90+7' | Report | Morrison 28', (yellow card) 67' | Stadium: Ewood Park; Attendance: 12,406; Referee: Tony Harrington |

| 19 March 2022 39 | Reading | 1–0 | Blackburn Rovers | Reading |
| 15:00 GMT | Yiadom (yellow card) 15'; Laurent 78' | Report | Buckley (yellow card) 49'; Wharton (yellow card) 90+4' | Stadium: Select Car Leasing Stadium; Referee: James Linington |

| 2 April 2022 40 | Coventry City | 2–2 | Blackburn Rovers | Coventry |
| 15:00 BST | Pickering 8' (o.g.); Robins (yellow card) 10'; Maatsen (yellow card) 76'; Gyökeres (yellow card) 78', (goal) 90+9' | Report | van Hecke (yellow card) 37'; Dack 46'; Gallagher (yellow card) 49'; Brereton Díaz (yellow card) 63'; Buckley (yellow card) 68'; Wharton (yellow card) 78', (goal) 82' | Stadium: Coventry Building Society Arena; Attendance: 19,939; Referee: Peter Bankes |

| 9 April 2022 41 | Blackburn Rovers | 1–1 | Blackpool | Blackburn |
| 15:00 BST | Gallagher 10', (yellow card) 63'; Pickering (yellow card) 80' | Report | Dougall (yellow card) 44'; Ekpiteta 48'; Madine (yellow card) 85'; Bowler (yellow card) 90+2'; Connolly (yellow card) 90+6' | Stadium: Ewood Park; Attendance: 17,806; Referee: Matt Donohue |

| 15 April 2022 42 | Peterborough United | 2–1 | Blackburn Rovers | Peterborough |
| 15:00 BST | Fuchs (yellow card) 51'; Szmodics 83'; Marriott 87' | Report | Edun (yellow card) 22' (yellow-red card) 41'; Brereton Díaz 77' van Hecke (yellow card) 83' | Stadium: Weston Homes Stadium; Attendance: 9,426; Referee: Chris Kavanagh |

| 18 April 2022 43 | Blackburn Rovers | 0–1 | Stoke City | Blackburn |
| 15:00 BST | Wharton (yellow card) 32' van Hecke (yellow card) 34' | Report | Brown 4'; Maja (yellow card) 23'; Smith (yellow card) 56' | Stadium: Ewood Park; Attendance: 13,428; Referee: Geoff Eltringham |

| 25 April 2022 44 | Preston North End | 1–4 | Blackburn Rovers | Preston |
| 19:45 BST | Browne 29', (yellow card) 38'; Whiteman (yellow card) 62' | Report | Pickering (yellow card) 1'; Gallagher 9', (yellow card) 21'; Buckley 12', (yellow card) 63'; Lenihan 37'; Travis 52' | Stadium: Deepdale; Referee: Jeremy Simpson |

| 30 April 2022 45 | Blackburn Rovers | 0–3 | Bournemouth | Blackburn |
| 15:00 BST | Wharton (yellow card) 15'; Hedges (yellow card) 40'; Buckley (yellow card) 48' van Hecke (yellow card) 52' | Report | Phillips (yellow card) 3'; Solanke 21'; Billing 70', 79'; Zemura (yellow card) 87' | Stadium: Ewood Park; Attendance: 21,396; Referee: Keith Stroud |

| 7 May 2022 46 | Birmingham City | 1–2 | Blackburn Rovers | Bordesley |
| 12:30 BST | Pedersen 78' | Report | Buckley 29'; Edun (yellow card) 43'; Brereton Díaz 45' | Stadium: St Andrew's Stadium; Referee: Andy Davies |

=== FA Cup ===
Rovers were drawn away to Wigan Athletic in the third round.

| 8 January 2022 Third round | Wigan Athletic | 3–2 | Blackburn Rovers | Wigan |
| 15:00 GMT | Power 61', (yellow card) 86'; McClean (yellow card) 73'; Whatmough 75'; Aasgaard 90+4' | Report | van Hecke (yellow card) 21'; Dolan (yellow card) 33'; Khadra 49'; Buckley (yellow card) 64'; Butterworth (yellow card) 72'; Ayala 89' | Stadium: DW Stadium; Attendance: 9,892; Referee: Tim Robinson |

=== EFL Cup ===
On 24 June 2021, the first round draw was confirmed.

| 10 August 2021 First round | Blackburn Rovers | 1–2 | Morecambe | Blackburn |
| 19:45 BST | Buckley (yellow card) 6'; Dolan 22'; Davenport (yellow card) 81' | Report | Stockton 52'; O'Connor (yellow card) 75'; Phillips 84' (pen.), (yellow card) 90+1' | Stadium: Ewood Park; Attendance: 5,283; Referee: Steve Martin |

== Backroom staff ==
| Position | Staff |
|---|---|
| Manager | (England) Tony Mowbray |
| Assistant manager | (England) Mark Venus |
| First-team coach | (England) David Lowe |
| First-team coach | (Northern Ireland) Damien Johnson |
| Goalkeeping coach | (England) Ben Benson |
| Head of Recruitment | (Scotland) John Park |
| Head of Academy | (England) Stuart Jones |
| Head of Academy coaching | (England) Tony Carss |
| Under-23 lead coach | (England) Mike Sheron |
| Under-18 lead coach | (England) Ryan Kidd |

Last updated: May 2017

== Squad statistics ==
=== Appearances and goals ===
As of 7 May 2022

| No. | Pos | Nat | Player | Total | | Championship | | FA Cup | | EFL Cup | |
| No. | Pos | Nat | Player | Apps | Goals | Apps | Goals | Apps | Goals | Apps | Goals |
|---|---|---|---|---|---|---|---|---|---|---|---|
| 1 | GK | (Belgium) BEL | Thomas Kaminski | 45 | 0 | 44+0 | 0 | 0+0 | 0 | 1+0 | 0 |
| 13 | GK | (England) ENG | Aynsley Pears | 4 | 0 | 2+1 | 0 | 1+0 | 0 | 0+0 | 0 |
| 41 | GK | (Greece) GRE | Antonis Stergiakis | 0 | 0 | 0+0 | 0 | 0+0 | 0 | 0+0 | 0 |
| 45 | GK | (England) ENG | Jordan Eastham | 0 | 0 | 0+0 | 0 | 0+0 | 0 | 0+0 | 0 |
| 2 | DF | (Namibia) NAM | Ryan Nyambe | 32 | 0 | 31+0 | 0 | 0+0 | 0 | 1+0 | 0 |
| 3 | DF | (England) ENG | Harry Pickering | 33 | 2 | 31+1 | 2 | 0+0 | 0 | 1+0 | 0 |
| 5 | DF | (Spain) ESP | Daniel Ayala | 22 | 3 | 16+5 | 2 | 1+0 | 1 | 0+0 | 0 |
| 15 | DF | (Republic of Ireland) IRL | James Brown | 1 | 0 | 1+0 | 0 | 0+0 | 0 | 0+0 | 0 |
| 16 | DF | (England) ENG | Scott Wharton | 30 | 2 | 30+0 | 2 | 0+0 | 0 | 0+0 | 0 |
| 25 | DF | (Netherlands) NED | Jan Paul van Hecke (on loan from Brighton & Hove Albion) | 32 | 1 | 30+1 | 1 | 1+0 | 0 | 0+0 | 0 |
| 26 | DF | (Republic of Ireland) IRL | Darragh Lenihan (C) | 43 | 3 | 41+0 | 3 | 1+0 | 0 | 1+0 | 0 |
| 33 | DF | (England) ENG | Lenni Cirino | 0 | 0 | 0+0 | 0 | 0+0 | 0 | 0+0 | 0 |
| 34 | DF | (England) ENG | Daniel Pike | 0 | 0 | 0+0 | 0 | 0+0 | 0 | 0+0 | 0 |
| 39 | DF | (England) ENG | Ashley Phillips | 0 | 0 | 0+0 | 0 | 0+0 | 0 | 0+0 | 0 |
| 42 | DF | (Netherlands) NED | Deyovaisio Zeefuik (on loan from Hertha Berlin) | 6 | 0 | 4+2 | 0 | 0+0 | 0 | 0+0 | 0 |
| 4 | MF | (England) ENG | Bradley Johnson | 19 | 0 | 8+10 | 0 | 0+1 | 0 | 0+0 | 0 |
| 6 | MF | (England) ENG | Jacob Davenport | 10 | 0 | 2+7 | 0 | 0+0 | 0 | 0+1 | 0 |
| 8 | MF | (England) ENG | Joe Rothwell | 43 | 3 | 36+5 | 3 | 1+0 | 0 | 1+0 | 0 |
| 11 | MF | (England) ENG | Joe Rankin-Costello | 10 | 0 | 6+4 | 0 | 0+0 | 0 | 0+0 | 0 |
| 19 | MF | (Wales) WAL | Ryan Hedges | 11 | 0 | 4+7 | 0 | 0+0 | 0 | 0+0 | 0 |
| 20 | MF | (England) ENG | Tayo Edun | 21 | 0 | 13+7 | 0 | 1+0 | 0 | 0+0 | 0 |
| 21 | MF | (England) ENG | John Buckley | 44 | 3 | 39+3 | 3 | 1+0 | 0 | 1+0 | 0 |
| 23 | MF | (England) ENG | Bradley Dack | 9 | 1 | 0+9 | 1 | 0+0 | 0 | 0+0 | 0 |
| 27 | MF | (England) ENG | Lewis Travis (VC) | 47 | 1 | 45+0 | 1 | 1+0 | 0 | 1+0 | 0 |
| 28 | MF | (England) ENG | Ryan Giles (on loan from Wolverhampton Wanderers) | 11 | 0 | 8+3 | 0 | 0+0 | 0 | 0+0 | 0 |
| 35 | MF | (England) ENG | Jake Garrett | 0 | 0 | 0+0 | 0 | 0+0 | 0 | 0+0 | 0 |
| 40 | MF | (England) ENG | Adam Wharton | 0 | 0 | 0+0 | 0 | 0+0 | 0 | 0+0 | 0 |
| 7 | FW | (Germany) GER | Reda Khadra (on loan from Brighton & Hove Albion) | 28 | 5 | 18+9 | 4 | 0+1 | 1 | 0+0 | 0 |
| 9 | FW | (England) ENG | Sam Gallagher | 39 | 9 | 28+9 | 9 | 1+0 | 0 | 0+1 | 0 |
| 10 | FW | (England) ENG | Tyrhys Dolan | 36 | 5 | 20+14 | 4 | 1+0 | 0 | 1+0 | 1 |
| 18 | FW | (England) ENG | Dilan Markanday | 2 | 0 | 0+2 | 0 | 0+0 | 0 | 0+0 | 0 |
| 22 | FW | (Chile) CHI | Ben Brereton Díaz | 39 | 22 | 34+3 | 22 | 1+0 | 0 | 1+0 | 0 |
| 30 | FW | (England) ENG | Ian Poveda (on loan from Leeds United) | 10 | 1 | 4+6 | 1 | 0+0 | 0 | 0+0 | 0 |
| 37 | FW | (Wales) WAL | Jack Vale | 2 | 0 | 0+2 | 0 | 0+0 | 0 | 0+0 | 0 |
Players out on loan:
| 14 | FW | (England) ENG | Daniel Butterworth (on loan from Fleetwood Town) | 14 | 0 | 1+11 | 0 | 0+1 | 0 | 0+1 | 0 |
| 17 | MF | (England) ENG | Harry Chapman (on loan at Burton Albion) | 3 | 0 | 0+3 | 0 | 0+0 | 0 | 0+0 | 0 |
| 24 | DF | (England) ENG | Hayden Carter (on loan at Portsmouth) | 10 | 0 | 5+4 | 0 | 0+0 | 0 | 1+0 | 0 |
| 32 | FW | (Scotland) SCO | Connor McBride (on loan at Queens Park) | 0 | 0 | 0+0 | 0 | 0+0 | 0 | 0+0 | 0 |
| 36 | DF | (England) ENG | Tyler Magloire (on loan at Northampton Town) | 5 | 0 | 1+3 | 0 | 0+0 | 0 | 1+0 | 0 |
| | GK | (England) ENG | Joe Hilton (on loan at Hamilton Academical) | 0 | 0 | 0+0 | 0 | 0+0 | 0 | 0+0 | 0 |
| | FW | (England) ENG | Sam Burns (on loan at Scunthorpe United) | 0 | 0 | 0+0 | 0 | 0+0 | 0 | 0+0 | 0 |
Players that played for Blackburn Rovers this season that have left the club:
| 19 | MF | (England) ENG | Leighton Clarkson (on loan from Liverpool) | 7 | 0 | 4+3 | 0 | 0+0 | 0 | 0+0 | 0 |

=== Goalscorers ===
As of 7 May 2022

| Rank | No. | Pos. | Name | League | FA Cup | EFL Cup | Total |
|---|---|---|---|---|---|---|---|
| 1 | 22 | FW | (Chile) Ben Brereton Díaz | 22 | 0 | 0 | 22 |
| 2 | 9 | FW | (England) Sam Gallagher | 9 | 0 | 0 | 9 |
| 3 | 7 | FW | (Germany) Reda Khadra | 4 | 1 | 0 | 5 |
| = | 10 | FW | (England) Tyrhys Dolan | 4 | 0 | 1 | 5 |
| 5 | 5 | DF | (Spain) Daniel Ayala | 2 | 1 | 0 | 3 |
| = | 8 | MF | (England) Joe Rothwell | 3 | 0 | 0 | 3 |
| = | 21 | MF | (England) John Buckley | 3 | 0 | 0 | 3 |
| = | 26 | DF | (Republic of Ireland) Darragh Lenihan | 3 | 0 | 0 | 3 |
| 8 | 3 | DF | (England) Harry Pickering | 2 | 0 | 0 | 2 |
| = | 16 | DF | (England) Scott Wharton | 2 | 0 | 0 | 2 |
| 11 | 23 | MF | (England) Bradley Dack | 1 | 0 | 0 | 1 |
| = | 25 | DF | (Netherlands) Jan Paul van Hecke | 1 | 0 | 0 | 1 |
| = | 27 | MF | (England) Lewis Travis | 1 | 0 | 0 | 1 |
| = | 30 | FW | (England) Ian Poveda | 1 | 0 | 0 | 1 |
| — | — | — | Own goal | 1 | 0 | 0 | 1 |
| Total | | | | 59 | 2 | 1 | 62 |

== Transfers ==
=== Summer ===
==== Transfers in ====
| Date | Position | Nationality | Name | From | Fee | Ref. | Other. |
|---|---|---|---|---|---|---|---|
| 7 July 2021 | MF | (England) | Harley O'Grady-Macken | (England) Wolverhampton Wanderers | Free transfer | | Signed for Blackburn Rovers U18's |
| 31 August 2021 | LB | (England) | Tayo Edun | (England) Lincoln City | Undisclosed (est £400,000) | | |

Total outgoing: +/- est ~£400,000

==== Transfers out ====
| Date from | Position | Nationality | Name | To | Fee | Ref. |
|---|---|---|---|---|---|---|
| 30 June 2021 | LB | (Jamaica) | Amari'i Bell | (England) (Luton Town) | Released | |
| 30 June 2021 | RM | (Jamaica) | Elliott Bennett | (England) (Shrewsbury Town) | Free transfer | |
| 30 June 2021 | CB | (England) | James Connolly | (Wales) (Cardiff City) | Released | |
| 30 June 2021 | CM | (England) | Stewart Downing | Retired | | |
| 30 June 2021 | CM | (Northern Ireland) | Corry Evans | (England) (Sunderland) | Released | |
| 30 June 2021 | CB | (England) | Joe Grayson | (England) (Barrow) | Released | |
| 30 June 2021 | CM | (Germany) | Lewis Holtby | (Germany) (Holstein Kiel) | Released | |
| 30 June 2021 | CM | (Northern Ireland) | Brad Lyons | (Scotland) (Kilmarnock) | Released | |
| 30 June 2021 | CM | (Spain) | Stefan Mols | (England) (Warrington Town) | Released | |
| 30 June 2021 | CB | (Scotland) | Charlie Mulgrew | (Scotland) (Dundee United) | Released | |
| 30 June 2021 | CM | (Canada) | Ben Paton | (Scotland) (Ross County) | Released | |
| 30 June 2021 | CM | (England) | Ben Pleavin | (England) (Accrington Stanley) | Released | |
| 30 June 2021 | LB | (Northern Ireland) | Lewis Thompson | (England) (Scunthorpe United) | Released | |
| 30 June 2021 | CM | (England) | Tom White | (England) (Barrow) | Released | |
| 30 June 2021 | CB | (England) | George Wyatt | (England) (Ramsbottom United) | Released | |
| 10 August 2021 | CF | (England) | Adam Armstrong | (England) Southampton | Undisclosed | |

† Brackets around club names indicate the player joined that club after his Blackburn Rovers contract expired.

Total incoming: +/- ~£ 0

==== Loans in ====
| Date from | Position | Nationality | Name | From | Length | Ref. |
|---|---|---|---|---|---|---|
| 16 August 2021 | CM | (England) | Leighton Clarkson | (England) Liverpool | Season-long (Cut Short 2 Jan 2022) | |
| 23 August 2021 | CM | (England) | Ian Poveda | (England) Leeds United | Season-long | |
| 29 August 2021 | CB | (Netherlands) | Jan Paul van Hecke | (England) Brighton & Hove Albion | Season-long | |
| 31 August 2021 | LW | (Germany) | Reda Khadra | (England) Brighton & Hove Albion | Season-long | |

==== Loans out ====
| Date from | Position | Nationality | Name | To | Length | Ref. |
|---|---|---|---|---|---|---|
| 28 June 2021 | GK | (England) | Joe Hilton | (Scotland) Hamilton Academical | Season-long | |
| 20 August 2021 | GK | (England) | Aidan Dowling | (England) FC Halifax Town | 1 month (Until 18 September 2021) | |
| 31 August 2021 | RW | (England) | Harry Chapman | (England) Burton Albion | 6 month (Until 2 January 2022) | |
| 9 September 2021 | RB | (England) | Dan Pike | (England) AFC Fylde | 1 month (Until 9 October 2021) | |
| 9 September 2021 | CF | (Wales) | Jack Vale | (England) FC Halifax Town | 4 month (Until 2 January 2022) | |
| 9 October 2021 | GK | (England) | Aidan Dowling | (England) Lancaster City | 1 month (Until 6 November 2021)(Extended until 8 January 2022) | |
| 16 October 2021 | CF | (England) | Sam Burns | (England) F.C. United of Manchester | 1 month (Until 13 November 2021) | |
| 22 October 2021 | CF | (England) | Brandon Lonsdale | (England) Lancaster City | 1 month (Until 20 November 2021) | |
| 28 October 2021 | CB | (England) | George Pratt | (England) Hyde United | 1 month (Until 27 November 2021) | |
| 29 October 2021 | CB | (Gibraltar) | Louie Annesley | (England) Woking | 1 month (Until 4 December 2021)(Extended until 3 January 2022)(Extended until 15 May 2022) | |
| 26 November 2021 | CF | (England) | Brandon Lonsdale | (England) Macclesfield | 1 month (Until 3 January 2022) (Extended until 2 April 2022) | |
| 17 December 2021 | MF | (England) | Joe Nolan | (England) Curzon Ashton | Short-term loan | |
| 21 December 2021 | RB | (England) | Dan Pike | (England) AFC Fylde | 1 month (Until 16 January 22)(Extended until 14 March 2022) | |

=== Winter ===
==== Transfers in ====
| Date | Position | Nationality | Name | From | Fee | Ref. | Other. |
|---|---|---|---|---|---|---|---|
| 6 January 2022 | RB | (Republic of Ireland) | James Brown | (Republic of Ireland) Drogheda United | Free transfer | | Signed for Blackburn Rovers U23's |
| 18 January 2022 | LW | (England) | Dilan Markanday | (England) Tottenham Hotspur | Undisclosed | | |
| 30 January 2022 | LW | (Wales) | Ryan Hedges | (Scotland) Aberdeen | Undisclosed | | |

Total outgoing: +/- ~£

==== Transfers out ====
| Date from | Position | Nationality | Name | To | Fee | Ref. |

Total incoming: +/- ~£ 0

==== Loans in ====
| Date from | Position | Nationality | Name | From | Length | Ref. |
|---|---|---|---|---|---|---|
| 14 January 2022 | RB | (Netherlands) | Deyovaisio Zeefuik | (Germany) Hertha Berlin | End of season | |
| 31 January 2022 | LWB | (England) | Ryan Giles | (England) Wolverhampton Wanderers | End of Season | |

==== Loans out ====
| Date from | Position | Nationality | Name | To | Length | Ref. |
|---|---|---|---|---|---|---|
| 4 January 2022 | CF | (England) | Sam Burns | (England) Scunthorpe United | End of Season | |
| 15 January 2022 | CB | (England) | Hayden Carter | (England) Portsmouth | End of Season | |
| 18 January 2022 | CB | (England) | Tyler Magloire | (England) Northampton Town | End of Season | |
| 18 January 2022 | GK | (England) | Aidan Dowling | (England) Marine | Short-Term | |
| 31 January 2022 | CF | (Scotland) | Connor McBride | (Scotland) Queens Park | End of Season | |
| 31 January 2022 | RW | (England) | Harry Chapman | (England) Burton Albion | End of Season | |
| 31 January 2022 | CF | (England) | Daniel Butterworth | (England) Fleetwood Town | End of Season | |
