= 2018–19 Blackburn Rovers F.C. season =

Blackburn Rovers
2018–19 season
- CEO: Steve Waggott
- Manager: Tony Mowbray
- Stadium: Ewood Park
- Championship: 15th
- FA Cup: Third round replay
- EFL Cup: Third round
- Top goalscorer: League: Bradley Dack / Danny Graham (15); All: Bradley Dack (18)
- Highest home attendance: League/All: 21,577 vs Preston North End (9 March 2019)
- Lowest home attendance: League: 11,818 vs Reading (22 August 2018); All: 5,211 vs Lincoln City (28 August 2018, EFL Cup)
- Average home league attendance: 14,552
- Biggest win: 5–1 vs Carlisle United (14 August 2018, EFL Cup)
- Biggest defeat: 1–4 vs Bristol City (2 September 2018, Championship)
Home colours	Away colours

The 2018–19 season is Blackburn Rovers' 131st season as a professional football club and it will participate in the Championship following promotion from League One the previous season. Along with competing in the Championship, the club will also participate in the FA Cup and EFL Cup. The season covers the period from 1 July 2018 to 30 June 2019.

== Summer activity ==
=== May ===
On 14 May, Rovers confirmed their retained list. Danny Graham, Craig Conway, Lewis Mansell were offered new contracts whilst Rovers took up the option to extend Charlie Albinson's and Andrew Jackson's contracts by 12 months.

Elliott Ward, Liam Feeney, Aaron Dillon and scholars Matthew Campbell, Matthew Chan, Callum Dolan, Ben Donnelly-Blackburn, Frank Jones and Brad Lynch have been informed that they will not be retained by the club upon the expiration of their current contract/scholarship.

=== June ===
On 11 June Rovers announced striker Danny Graham had signed a new 12-month contract, until 2019, with the option of a further 12 months.

On 13 June Rovers announced midfielder Craig Conway signed a new 12-month contract, until 2019, with the option of a further 12 months.

On 22 June Rovers announced Rovers signed midfielder Joe Rothwell from Oxford United for an undisclosed fee on a three-year deal, until 2021. Also David Dunn left his role as the club's under-23 assistant manager.

=== July ===
On 2 July Rovers announced the signing of midfielder Jacob Davenport from Manchester City for an undisclosed fee on a 4-year deal, until 2022.

On 3 July Rovers announced that defender Darragh Lenihan had signed a new 4-year contract, until 2022.

On 12 July Rovers announced that defender Derrick Williams had signed a new 3-year contract, until 2021.

On 13 July Rovers announced that defender Richie Smallwood had signed a new 2-year contract, until 2020.

On 18 July Rovers announced that defender Scott Wharton had signed a new 3-year contract, until 2021.

On 20 July Rovers announced that attacking midfielder Bradley Dack had signed a new 3-year contract, until 2021.

On 22 July Rovers announced defender Scott Wharton has re-joined Lincoln City on loan until the end of the season.

On 30 July Rovers announced the signing of attacking midfielder Kasey Palmer from Chelsea on loan until the end of the season.

=== August ===
On 3 August Rovers announced defender Matthew Platt has joined Accrington Stanley on loan until the end of the season.

On 6 August Rovers announced the signing of attacker Adam Armstrong from Newcastle United for an undisclosed fee on a 4-year deal, until 2022.

On 23 August Rovers announced the signing of midfielder Jack Rodwell on a free transfer on a 12-month contract until 2019, following his release from Sunderland. Also Blackpool announced the signing of Liam Feeney following his release from Rovers in the summer.

On 27 August Rovers announced the signing of midfielder Harrison Reed from Southampton on loan until the end of the season.

On 28 August Rovers announced the signing of forward Ben Brereton from Nottingham Forest on loan until January, with the option to make his transfer permanent.

On 30 August Rovers announced defender Sam Hart had re-joined Rochdale on loan until the end of the season and midfielder Lewis Hardcastle had joined Port Vale on loan until the end of the season.

On 31 August Rovers announced that goalkeeper Andrew Fisher had signed a new 3-year contract, until 2021. It was also announced that Rovers had reached a mutual agreement with Paul Caddis and Peter Whittingham to terminate their contracts with immediate effect. Rovers also announced the signing of young forward Mitchel Candlin from Walsall on loan with the option to make the move permanent in January.

=== September ===
On 3 September Notts County announced the signing of Elliott Ward following his release in the summer.

On 4 September Rovers announced the deadline day signing of young attacking midfielder Brad Lyons from Coleraine on loan until January, with the option to make his transfer permanent, had been approved.

On 7 September Rovers announced young development squad pair Lewis Thompson & Lewis Mansell have joined FC United on a 1-month loan until 6 October.

On 21 September Rovers announced young defender Jack Doyle has joined Maidstone United on a 3-month loan until 22 December.

On 28 September Rovers announced young goalkeeper Oliver Byrne have joined Bamber Bridge on a 1-month loan until 27 October.

=== October ===
On 8 October Rovers announced young development squad pair Lewis Thompson & Lewis Mansell will remain at FC United for a further month until 10 November.

On 26 October Rovers announced young goalkeeper Charlie Albinson have joined Warrington Town on a 1-month loan until 1 December.

=== November ===
On 9 November it was announced that defender Jack Doyle has returned from his loan spell from Maidstone United due to injury.

On 12 November Rovers announced youngster Lewis Thompson will remain at FC United for a further month until 15 December, while Lewis Mansell will return to the club following the end of his loan spell.

On 15 November Rovers announced that defender Charlie Mulgrew had signed a new 2 1/2-year contract, until 2021.

On 16 November Rovers announced that midfielder Elliott Bennett had signed a new 2 1/2-year contract, until 2021. Also Bradford City announced the signing of Paul Caddis following his release.

On 30 November Rovers announced manager Tony Mowbray had signed a new long-term contract putting pen to paper on a new 3 1/2-year deal, until 2020.

== Winter activity ==
=== December ===
On 3 December Rovers announced u23 goalkeeper Charlie Albinson will remain at Warrington Town for a further month until 2 January.

On 10 December Rovers announced that u23 defender Joe Grayson had signed a new 2 1/2-year contract, until 2021.

On 13 December Rovers announced that midfielder Corry Evans had signed a new 2 1/2-year contract, until 2021.

=== January ===
On 2 January Rovers announced Matthew Platt and Sam Hart had been recalled from their loan spells from Accrington Stanley and Rochdale.

On 4 January Rovers announced the permanent signing of forward Ben Brereton from Nottingham Forest for an undisclosed fee on a 3 1/2-year deal, until 2022 and that forward Danny Graham had signed a one-year contract extension, until 2020.

On 7 January Rovers announced Lewis Hardcastle had been recalled from their loan spells from Port Vale.

On 9 January Rovers announced Kasey Palmer had been recalled by Chelsea, to join Bristol City on loan.

On 11 January Rovers announced the permanent signing of attacking midfielder Brad Lyons from Coleraine on an 18-month deal, until 2020.

On 14 January Rovers announced Mitchel Candlin had been recalled by Walsall. Also u23 goalkeeper Oliver Byrne had joined Stevenage on loan until the end of the season.

On 15 January Rovers announced that u23 attacking midfielder Brad Lyons had joined St Mirren on loan until the end of the season. Also defender Sam Hart had joined Southend United on loan until the end of the season.

On 16 January Rovers announced that u23 defender Sam Barnes had joined Marine on short loan deal until 14 February. Also u23 forward Lewis Mansell had joined Partick Thistle on loan until the end of the season.

On 18 January Rovers announced that defender Joe Grayson had joined Grimsby Town on loan until the end of the season.

On 22 January Rovers announced that defender Sam Hart had signed a 1-year contract extension, until 2020.

On 23 January Rovers announced that defender Scott Wharton has been recalled from his loan spell at Lincoln City & joined Bury on loan until the end of the season.

On 24 January Rovers announced that defender Paul Downing had joined Doncaster Rovers on loan until the end of the season.

On 28 January Rovers announced the signing of winger Harry Chapman from Middlesbrough for an undisclosed fee on a 2 1/2-year deal, until 2021.

On 30 January Rovers announced the signing of young Gibraltar international Louie Annesley from Lincoln Red Imps for an undisclosed fee on a 2 1/2-year deal, until 2021.

On 31 January Rovers announced u23 goalkeeper Oliver Byrne had joined Stevenage permanently, It was also announced that U23 pair Willem Tomlinson and Okera Simmonds had left the club by mutual consent.

=== February ===
On 1 February Rovers announced that u23 defender Tyler Magloire had signed a new 3 1/2-year contract, until 2022. It was also announced that Okera Simmonds had joined Accrington Stanley following his release.

On 4 February it was announced Willem Tomlinson had joined Mansfield Town following his release.

On 8 February Rovers announced that u23 goalkeeper Andy Fisher had joined FC United on a months loan. Also announced u23 midfielder Lewis Hardcastle had joined Barrow on a months loan. Rovers hosted an Hall of Fame event with the following players been introduced into it Ronnie Clayton, Bob Crompton, Bryan Douglas, Derek Fazackerley, Simon Garner, Alan Shearer & Brad Friedel.

On 9 February Rovers announced that u23 defender Matthew Platt had joined Southport on a months loan./

On 15 February Rovers announced that u23 defender Sam Barnes had signed his 1st professional contract putting pen to paper on a 2 1/2-year contract, until 2021.

On 20 February Rovers announced that u23 Canadian midfielder Ben Paton had signed a new 1 1/2-year contract, until 2020.

=== March ===
On 1 March Rovers announced that u23 midfielder John Buckley had signed a new 3 1/2-year contract, until 2022.

On 5 March Rovers announced Indian forward Aniket Jadhav will join the academy for a 3-month training spell.

On 8 March Rovers announced that u23 goalkeeper Andy Fisher had extended his loan at FC United for a further month.

On 13 March Rovers announced that u23 pair Lewis Hardcastle & Matthew Platt had their loan spells extended, midfielder Hardcastle will remain at Barrow until 7 April & defender Platt will remain at Southport until 29 April.

On 16 March Rovers announced that u23 defender Lewis Thompson had signed a new deal until 2020.

On 21 March Rovers announced that u23 forward Daniel Butterworth had signed a new 3 1/2-year contract, until 2022.

On 27 March Rovers announced that u23 midfielder Stefan Mols had signed a new 2-year contract, until 2021.

On 28 March Rovers announced that u23 midfielder Lewis Hardcastle had joined Barrow permanently.

=== April ===
On 2 April Rovers announced that u23 defender Charley Doyle had signed a new 12-month contract, until 2020.

On 4 April Rovers announced that u23 midfielder Joe Rankin-Costello had signed a new 2-year contract, until 2021.

On 23 April Rovers announced that defender Ryan Nyambe had signed a new contract until 2021.

On 31 April Rovers held their end of season awards the winners follow:

Young Player – Lewis Travis, Players’ Player – Danny Graham, Best Newcomer – Harrison Reed, Unsung Hero – Damien Johnson, Man of the Match (Seasonal) – Darragh Lenihan, Goal of the Season – Joe Rothwell, Player of the Year – Danny Graham.

=== May ===
On 11 May Rovers announced that defender Matthew Platt had signed a new 1-year contract until 2020.

== Squad information ==
Squad no.	Name	Nationality	Position(s)	Date of birth (age)	Contract expires	Other
Goalkeepers
33	Andy Fisher	(England)	GK	12 February 1998 (age 28)	2021	On loan at FC United
13	Jayson Leutwiler	(Canada)	GK	25 April 1989 (age 37)	2019	Option for 1-year extension
1	David Raya	(Spain)	GK	15 September 1995 (age 31)	2021	
Defenders
17	Amari'i Bell	(England)	DF	5 May 1994 (age 32)	2020	
25	Paul Downing	(England)	DF	26 October 1991 (age 34)	2019	Option for 1-year extension, on loan at Doncaster Rovers
35	Joe Grayson	(England)	DF	26 March 1999 (age 27)	2021	on loan at Grimsby Town
30	Sam Hart	(England)	DF	10 September 1996 (age 30)	2020	on loan at Southend United
26	Darragh Lenihan	(Republic of Ireland)	DF	16 March 1994 (age 32)	2022	
38	Tyler Magloire	(England)	DF	21 December 1998 (age 27)	2022	
14	Charlie Mulgrew	(Scotland)	DF	6 March 1986 (age 40)	2021	
2	Ryan Nyambe	(Namibia)	DF	4 December 1997 (age 28)	2021	
5	Jack Rodwell	(England)	DF	11 March 1991 (age 35)	2019	
	Scott Wharton	(England)	DF	3 October 1997 (age 29)	2021	on loan at Bury
3	Derrick Williams	(Republic of Ireland)	DF	17 January 1993 (age 33)	2021	
Midfielders
31	Elliott Bennett	(Jamaica)	MF	18 December 1988 (age 37)	2021	
39	John Buckley	(England)	MF	13 October 1999 (age 27)	2022	
11	Harry Chapman	(England)	MF	5 November 1997 (age 28)	2021	
32	Craig Conway	(Scotland)	MF	2 May 1985 (age 41)	2019	Option for 1-year extension
23	Bradley Dack	(England)	MF	31 December 1993 (age 32)	2021	
18	Jacob Davenport	(England)	MF	28 December 1998 (age 27)	2022	
29	Corry Evans	(Northern Ireland)	MF	30 July 1990 (age 36)	2021	
22	Ben Gladwin	(England)	MF	8 June 1992 (age 34)	2019	
4	Harrison Reed	(England)	MF	27 January 1995 (age 31)	2019	on loan from Southampton
8	Joe Rothwell	(England)	MF	11 January 1995 (age 31)	2021	
6	Richie Smallwood	(England)	MF	29 December 1990 (age 35)	2020	
27	Lewis Travis	(England)	MF	16 October 1997 (age 29)	2021	
Forwards
7	Adam Armstrong	(England)	FW	10 February 1997 (age 29)	2022	
19	Ben Brereton	(England)	FW	18 April 1999 (age 27)	2022	
34	Daniel Butterworth	(England)	FW	14 September 1999 (age 27)	2022	
10	Danny Graham	(England)	FW	12 August 1985 (age 41)	2020	
24	Joe Nuttall	(England)	FW	27 January 1997 (age 29)	2021	
9	Dominic Samuel	(England)	FW	1 April 1994 (age 32)	2020	

== Pre-season friendlies ==
Blackburn Rovers announced six pre-season friendlies against Scottish Premiership side Hibernian, EFL League Two's Port Vale, Champions League finalists Liverpool, EFL League Two's Lincoln City, Premier League side Everton and newly promoted EFL League One side Accrington Stanley,

8 July 2018 Friendly	Hibernian	0–2	Blackburn Rovers	Edinburgh
15:00 BST		Report	Conway 54'; Tomlinson 55'	Stadium: Easter Road; Referee: Gavin Duncan

14 July 2018 Friendly	Port Vale	1–1	Blackburn Rovers	Stoke-on-Trent
15:00 BST	Mulgrew 10' (o.g.)	Report	Lenihan 24'	Stadium: Vale Park; Attendance: 966 (245 Rovers fans); Referee: Oli Yates

19 July 2018 Friendly	Blackburn Rovers	0–2	Liverpool	Blackburn
19:45 BST		Report	Marković 63'; Sturridge 73'	Stadium: Ewood Park; Attendance: 14,620; Referee: Jonathan Moss

22 July 2018 Friendly	Lincoln City	0–1	Blackburn Rovers	Lincoln
15:00 BST		Report	Nuttall 43'	Stadium: Sincil Bank; Attendance: 3,275; Referee: John Brooks

26 July 2018 Friendly	Blackburn Rovers	3–0	Everton	Blackburn
19:45 BST	Lenihan 10'; Samuel 40'; Dack 69'	Report		Stadium: Ewood Park; Attendance: 7,478; Referee: Martin Atkinson

28 July 2018 Friendly	Accrington Stanley	1–0	Blackburn Rovers	Accrington
15:00 BST	Kee 11'	Report		Stadium: Crown Ground; Attendance: 2,716; Referee: Darren Bond

== Championship season ==
=== League table ===
Pos	Team	Pld	W	D	L	GF	GA	GD	Pts
12	Sheffield Wednesday	46	16	16	14	60	62	−2	64
13	Hull City	46	17	11	18	66	68	−2	62
14	Preston North End	46	16	13	17	67	67	0	61
15	Blackburn Rovers	46	16	12	18	64	69	−5	60
16	Stoke City	46	11	22	13	45	52	−7	55
17	Birmingham City	46	14	19	13	64	58	+6	52 (Note: Birmingham City were deducted 9 points for failure to comply with the EFL profitability and sustainability rules.)
18	Wigan Athletic	46	13	13	20	51	64	−13	52

Source: Sky Sports Archived 25 September 2019 at the Wayback Machine
Rules for classification: 1) Points; 2) Goal difference; 3) Number of goals scored; 4) Head-to-head results

==== Results summary ====
Overall								Home						Away					
Pld	W	D	L	GF	GA	GD	Pts	W	D	L	GF	GA	GD	W	D	L	GF	GA	GD
46	16	12	18	64	69	−5	60	10	7	6	32	21	+11	6	5	12	32	48	−16

Last updated: 4 May 2019.
Source: BBC

==== Results by matchday ====
Matchday	1	2	3	4	5	6	7	8	9	10	11	12	13	14	15	16	17	18	19	20	21	22	23	24	25	26	27	28	29	30	31	32	33	34	35	36	37	38	39	40	41	42	43	44	45	46
Ground	A	H	A	H	H	A	H	A	A	H	H	A	H	A	A	H	H	A	A	H	A	H	H	A	A	H	A	H	H	A	H	A	H	A	A	H	H	A	A	H	H	A	A	H	A	H
Result	D	D	W	D	W	L	D	D	W	D	L	W	W	L	D	W	D	L	L	W	D	D	L	L	L	W	W	W	W	L	L	L	L	D	L	L	W	L	L	L	W	W	W	W	L	D
Position	8	15	10	9	5	13	13	13	12	13	14	9	7	7	12	8	9	10	13	10	11	12	14	14	15	15	14	10	8	11	13	14	14	14	17	17	16	17	16	16	16	15	14	14	14	14

Updated to match(es) played on 4 May 2019. Source: 11v11
A = Away; H = Home; W = Win; D = Draw; L = Loss

=== Matchday ===
On 21 June 2018, the Championship fixtures for the forthcoming season were announced.

4 August 2018 1	Ipswich Town	2–2	Blackburn Rovers	Ipswich
15:00 BST	Edwards 5'; Edun 90+1'	Report	Graham 20'; Dack 29'	Stadium: Portman Road; Attendance: 18,940; Referee: Andy Davies

11 August 2018 2	Blackburn Rovers	0–0	Millwall	Blackburn
15:00 BST		Report		Stadium: Ewood Park; Attendance: 13,239; Referee: Gavin Ward

18 August 2018 3	Hull City	0–1	Blackburn Rovers	Kingston upon Hull
15:00 BST		Report	Dack 43'	Stadium: KCOM Stadium; Attendance: 12,233; Referee: David Coote

22 August 2018 4	Blackburn Rovers	2–2	Reading	Blackburn
19:45 BST	Mulgrew 51' (pen.), 76' (pen.)	Report	Böðvarsson 12', 25'	Stadium: Ewood Park; Attendance: 11,818; Referee: Oliver Langford

25 August 2018 5	Blackburn Rovers	1–0	Brentford	Blackburn
15:00 BST	Palmer 43'	Report		Stadium: Ewood Park; Attendance: 12,094; Referee: Tony Harrington

2 September 2018 6	Bristol City	4–1	Blackburn Rovers	Bristol
13:30 BST	Brownhill 38'; Watkins 55'; Diédhiou 73'; Pack 82'	Report	Mulgrew 13'	Stadium: Ashton Gate Stadium; Attendance: 19,769; Referee: David Webb

15 September 2018 7	Blackburn Rovers	1–1	Aston Villa	Blackburn
17:30 BST	Dack 76'	Report	Hourihane 90+3'	Stadium: Ewood Park; Attendance: 15,982; Referee: Steve Martin

18 September 2018 8	Derby County	0–0	Blackburn Rovers	Derby
15:00 BST		Report		Stadium: Pride Park Stadium; Attendance: 23,580; Referee: Darren England

22 September 2018 9	Stoke City	2–3	Blackburn Rovers	Stoke-on-Trent
15:00 BST	Berahino 79'; Ince 76'	Report	Dack 26'; Graham 44'; Reed 46'	Stadium: bet365 Stadium; Attendance: 25,673; Referee: Tony Harrington

29 September 2018 10	Blackburn Rovers	2–2	Nottingham Forest	Blackburn
15:00 BST	Armstrong 65'; Dack 74'	Report	Grabban 52', 80' (pen.)	Stadium: Ewood Park; Attendance: 14,440; Referee: Andrew Madley

3 October 2018 11	Blackburn Rovers	0–2	Sheffield United	Blackburn
19:45 BST		Report	Sharp 66', 79'	Stadium: Ewood Park; Attendance: 14,440; Referee: Robert Jones

6 October 2018 12	Bolton Wanderers	0–1	Blackburn Rovers	Bolton
17:30 BST		Report	Dack 22'	Stadium: University of Bolton Stadium; Attendance: 15,461; Referee: Darren Bond

20 October 2018 13	Blackburn Rovers	2–1	Leeds United	Blackburn
12:00 BST	Graham 2'; Lenihan 70'	Report	Klich 45+1'	Stadium: Ewood Park; Attendance: 20,929; Referee: Darren England

23 October 2018 14	Swansea City	3–1	Blackburn Rovers	Swansea
19:45 BST	Raya 64' (o.g.); Roberts 68'; Celina 85'	Report	Mulgrew 26' (pen.)	Stadium: Liberty Stadium; Attendance: 18,035; Referee: Geoff Eltringham

27 October 2018 15	West Bromwich Albion	1–1	Blackburn Rovers	West Bromwich
15:00 BST	Dawson 40'	Report	Reed 71'	Stadium: The Hawthorns; Attendance: 23,820; Referee: Scott Duncan

3 November 2018 16	Blackburn Rovers	1–0	Queens Park Rangers	Blackburn
15:00 GMT	Dack 74' (pen.)	Report		Stadium: Ewood Park; Attendance: 13,294; Referee: Peter Bankes

10 November 2018 17	Blackburn Rovers	1–1	Rotherham United	Blackburn
15:00 GMT	Dack 81'	Report	Smith 75', (yellow card) 79'	Stadium: Ewood Park; Attendance: 12,847; Referee: David Webb

24 November 2018 18	Preston North End	4–1	Blackburn Rovers	Preston
15:00 GMT	Barkhuizen 2'; Robinson 10'; Moult 74'; Browne 85'	Report	Graham 48'	Stadium: Deepdale; Attendance: 19,912; Referee: Andrew Madley

28 November 2018 19	Wigan Athletic	3–1	Blackburn Rovers	Wigan
19:45 GMT	Roberts 37'; Vaughan 54' (pen.); McManaman 86'	Report	Burn 83' (o.g.)	Stadium: DW Stadium; Attendance: 10,777; Referee: Keith Stroud

1 December 2018 20	Blackburn Rovers	4–2	Sheffield Wednesday	Blackburn
15:00 GMT	Graham 11', 66', 90'; Downing (yellow card) 39'; Dack 53'	Report	Bannan (yellow card) 57'; Lucas João 62'; Raya 85' (o.g.)	Stadium: Ewood Park; Attendance: 15,154; Referee: Robert Jones

8 December 2018 21	Middlesbrough	1–1	Blackburn Rovers	Middlesbrough
15:00 GMT	Shotton (yellow card) 13'; Bešić (red card) 21'; Assombalonga 62'; Friend (yellow card) 43'	Report	Williams (yellow card) 18'; Mulgrew 22'; Dack (yellow card) 55'	Stadium: Riverside Stadium; Attendance: 21,985; Referee: Simon Hooper

15 December 2018 22	Blackburn Rovers	2–2	Birmingham City	Blackburn
15:00 GMT	Graham 19'; Armstrong 46'	Report	Gardner 78' (pen.); Adams 80'	Stadium: Ewood Park; Attendance: 13,622; Referee: Tony Harrington

22 December 2018 23	Blackburn Rovers	0–1	Norwich City	Blackburn
15:00 GMT	Evans (yellow card) 23'; Smallwood (yellow card) 29'	Report	Hernández (yellow card) 28'; Leitner (yellow card) 42'; Pukki 86'; Cantwell (yellow card) 90+3'	Stadium: Ewood Park; Attendance: 14,202; Referee: Darren England

26 December 2018 24	Leeds United	3–2	Blackburn Rovers	Leeds
15:00 GMT	Williams 33' (o.g.); Douglas (yellow card) 77'; Phillips (yellow card) 89'; Roofe 90+1', 90+4'	Report	Rodwell (yellow card) 44'; Mulgrew 47' (pen.), 90'; Lenihan (yellow card) 85'	Stadium: Elland Road; Attendance: 34,863; Referee: Steve Martin

29 December 2018 25	Sheffield United	3–0	Blackburn Rovers	Sheffield
15:00 GMT	Basham (red card) 51'; Sharp 73', 77'; McGoldrick 82'	Report	Smallwood (red card) 71'	Stadium: Bramall Lane; Attendance: 27,384; Referee: Anthony Taylor

1 January 2019 26	Blackburn Rovers	2–1	West Bromwich Albion	Blackburn
15:00 GMT	Bennett (yellow card) 52'; Mulgrew 53'; Dack 58'; Brereton (yellow card) 89'; Reed (yellow card) 90+2'	Report	Adarabioyo (yellow card) 41'; Rodriguez 63' (pen.); Dawson (yellow card) 77'; Livermore (red card) 87'; Barry (yellow card) 90+3'	Stadium: Ewood Park; Attendance: 14,258; Referee: Oliver Langford

12 January 2019 27	Millwall	0–2	Blackburn Rovers	Bermondsey
17:30 GMT		Report	Nuttall 86'; Armstrong 87'	Stadium: The Den; Attendance: 13,862; Referee: Robert Jones

19 January 2019 28	Blackburn Rovers	2–0	Ipswich Town	Blackburn
15:00 GMT	Graham 65' (pen.); Lenihan (yellow card) 69'; Nuttall 74'; Nuttall (yellow card) 76'	Report	Chambers (yellow card) 66'	Stadium: Ewood Park; Attendance: 12,762; Referee: Darren England

26 January 2019 29	Blackburn Rovers	3–0	Hull City	Blackburn
15:00 GMT	Armstrong 10'; Rodwell 17'; Reed 74'; Rodwell (yellow card) 87'	Report	Grosicki (yellow card) 64'	Stadium: Ewood Park; Attendance: 13,589; Referee: Jeremy Simpson

2 February 2019 30	Brentford	5–2	Blackburn Rovers	Brentford
15:00 GMT	Benrahma 13'; Barbet (yellow card) 45+3'; Watkins 58', 73'; Maupay 79'; Canós 90+2'	Report	Dack 2'; Graham 7'; Lenihan (yellow card) 71'	Stadium: Griffin Park; Attendance: 9,972; Referee: Andy Davies

9 February 2019 31	Blackburn Rovers	0–1	Bristol City	Blackburn
15:00 GMT	Travis (yellow card) 25'	Report	Wright (yellow card) 37'; Brownhill (yellow card) 75'; Pisano 80'; Fielding (yellow card) 90+3'	Stadium: Ewood Park; Attendance: 13,593; Referee: James Linington

13 February 2019 32	Reading	2–1	Blackburn Rovers	Reading
20:00 GMT	Ejaria (yellow card) 40'; Swift 45+1'; Oliveira 86'	Report	Brereton (yellow card) 42'; Bell 82'	Stadium: Madejski Stadium; Referee: Stephen Martin

17 February 2019 33	Blackburn Rovers	0–1	Middlesbrough	Blackburn
13:00 GMT	Rodwell (yellow card) 33'; Williams (red card) 45'	Report	Assombalonga 19'	Stadium: Ewood Park; Attendance: 13,249; Referee: Darren Bond

23 February 2019 34	Birmingham City	2–2	Blackburn Rovers	Birmingham
15:00 GMT	Adams 16', 85'	Report	Mulgrew (yellow card) 46' (goal) 52'; Graham 83'; Smallwood (yellow card) 86'	Stadium: St Andrew's; Attendance: 21,869; Referee: Peter Bankes

2 March 2019 35	Rotherham United	3–2	Blackburn Rovers	Rotherham
15:00 GMT	Ajayi 2', 83'; Robertson (yellow card) 30'; Mattock (yellow card) 50'; Williams 57'; Ihiekwe (yellow card) 90+3'	Report	Smallwood (yellow card) 8'; Bell 51'; Mulgrew 90+3' (pen.)	Stadium: New York Stadium; Attendance: 9,663; Referee: John Brooks

9 March 2019 36	Blackburn Rovers	0–1	Preston North End	Blackburn
12:00 GMT	Evans (yellow card) 58'; Reed (yellow card) 60'	Report	Johnson 8'; Fisher (yellow card) 81' (yellow-red card) 90+2'	Stadium: Ewood Park; Attendance: 21,577; Referee: Oliver Langford

12 March 2019 37	Blackburn Rovers	3–0	Wigan Athletic	Blackburn
19:45 GMT	Graham 39' (pen.), 54'; Conway (yellow card) 45'; Williams (yellow card) 80'; Dack 86'; Rothwell (yellow card) 89'	Report	Olsson (yellow card) 42'; Dunkley (yellow card) 42'; Garner (yellow card) 78'; James (yellow card) 85'	Stadium: Ewood Park; Attendance: 12,763; Referee: Chris Kavanagh

16 March 2019 38	Sheffield Wednesday	4–2	Blackburn Rovers	Owlerton
15:00 GMT	Fletcher 10' (yellow card) 40'; Winnall (yellow card) 52'; Nuhiu 60'; Aarons (yellow card) 74'; Iorfa 79'; Lees (yellow card) 81'; Matias 86'	Report	Conway 72'; Bennett 88'	Stadium: Hillsborough Stadium; Attendance: 24,608; Referee: James Linington

30 March 2019 39	Aston Villa	2–1	Blackburn Rovers	Aston
15:00 GMT	Abraham 8'; Mings 61'; McGinn (yellow card) 77'	Report	Bennett (yellow card) 26'; Bell 74'	Stadium: Villa Park; Attendance: 39,687; Referee: Robert Jones

6 April 2019 40	Blackburn Rovers	0–1	Stoke City	Blackburn
15:00 BST	Williams (yellow card) 76'; Bennett (yellow card) 90+4'	Report	Etebo 14'; Bojan (penalty missed) 45+3'	Stadium: Ewood Park; Attendance: 17,478; Referee: Geoff Eltringham

9 April 2019 41	Blackburn Rovers	2–0	Derby County	Blackburn
19:45 BST	Bennett (yellow card) 51'; Rothwell 76'; Travis (yellow card) 85'; Dack 90+2'	Report		Stadium: Ewood Park; Attendance: 12,590; Referee: Jeremy Simpson

13 April 2019 42	Nottingham Forest	1–2	Blackburn Rovers	West Bridgford
15:00 BST	Bennett 52' (o.g.); Yates (yellow card) 56'; Byram (yellow card) 74'	Report	Rothwell 29'; Graham 49'; Bennett (yellow card) 68'; Evans (yellow card) 69'; Williams (yellow card) 82'	Stadium: City Ground; Attendance: 27,786; Referee: Darren Bond

19 April 2019 43	Queens Park Rangers	1–2	Blackburn Rovers	Shepherd's Bush
15:00 BST	Luongo (yellow card) 59'; Osayi-Samuel (yellow card) 81'; Smith 90+2'; Wells (yellow card) 90+3'	Report	Graham 22' (pen.); Dack (yellow card) 31' (goal) 46'; Rodwell (yellow card) 83'; Leutwiler (yellow card) 90+7'	Stadium: Loftus Road; Attendance: 13,632; Referee: Tim Robinson

22 April 2019 44	Blackburn Rovers	2–0	Bolton Wanderers	Blackburn
15:00 BST	Brereton 30'; Armstrong 50'	Report		Stadium: Ewood Park; Attendance: 14,495; Referee: Andy Woolmer

27 April 2019 45	Norwich City	2–1	Blackburn Rovers	Norwich
19:30 BST	Stiepermann 13'; Vrančić 21'; Zimmermann (yellow card) 64'	Report	Lenihan (yellow card) 18'; Travis 23'; Dack (yellow card) 53'; Armstrong (yellow card) 81'	Stadium: Carrow Road; Attendance: 26,848; Referee: Andrew Madley

5 May 2019 46	Blackburn Rovers	2–2	Swansea City	Blackburn
12:30 BST	Lenihan 21'; Dack (yellow card) 44' (goal) 47'	Report	Baker-Richardson 25'; McBurnie 35'; Carter-Vickers (yellow card) 69'	Stadium: Ewood Park; Attendance: 16,227; Referee: Jarred Gillett

== EFL Cup ==
Rovers entered the EFL Cup in the first round and were drawn away to Carlisle United. The second round draw was made from the Stadium of Light on 16 August. The third round draw was made on 30 August 2018 by David Seaman and Joleon Lescott.

14 August 2018 First round	Carlisle United	1–5	Blackburn Rovers	Carlisle
19:45 BST	Hope 22'	Report	Armstrong 2', 54'; Dack 6', 34'; Palmer 40'	Stadium: Brunton Park; Attendance: 3,156; Referee: Ross Joyce

28 August 2018 Second round	Blackburn Rovers	4–1	Lincoln City	Blackburn
19:45 BST	Nuttall 4'; Graham 49'; Downing 61'; Palmer 77'	Report	Luque 28'	Stadium: Ewood Park; Attendance: 5,211; Referee: Geoff Eltringham

25 September 2018 Third round	Bournemouth	3–2	Blackburn Rovers	Boscombe
19:45 BST	Stanislas 14'; Ibe 58' (pen.); Wilson 90+4'	Report	Conway 64'; Armstrong 72' (pen.); Williams (red card) 90+4'	Stadium: Dean Court; Attendance: 9,715; Referee: Simon Hooper

== FA Cup ==
The third round draw was made live on BBC by Ruud Gullit and Paul Ince from Stamford Bridge on 3 December 2018.

5 January 2019 Third round	Newcastle United	1–1	Blackburn Rovers	Newcastle upon Tyne
17:30 GMT	Ritchie 84' (pen.)	Report	Dack 56'	Stadium: St James' Park; Attendance: 36,440; Referee: Kevin Friend

15 January 2019 Third round replay	Blackburn Rovers	2–4 (a.e.t.)	Newcastle United	Blackburn
19:45 GMT	Armstrong 33'; Lenihan 45+1'	Report	Longstaff 1'; Roberts 22'; Fernández (yellow card) 90+3'; Joselu 105+3'; Pérez 106'	Stadium: Ewood Park; Attendance: 14,228; Referee: Lee Probert

== Backroom staff ==
Position	Staff
Manager	(England) Tony Mowbray
Assistant manager	(England) Mark Venus
First-team coach	(England) David Lowe
Goalkeeping coach	(England) Ben Benson
Head of Academy	(England) Stuart Jones
Head of Academy coaching	(England) Tony Carss
Under-23 lead coach	(Northern Ireland) Damien Johnson
Under-13 lead coach	(Netherlands) George Boateng

Last updated: May 2017

== 1st Team squad statistics ==
As of 5 May 2019

No.	Pos	Nat	Player	Total		Championship		FA Cup		EFL Cup	
No.	Pos	Nat	Player	Apps	Goals	Apps	Goals	Apps	Goals	Apps	Goals
1	GK	(Spain) ESP	David Raya	46	0	41+0	0	2+0	0	3+0	0
13	GK	(Canada) CAN	Jayson Leutwiler	5	0	5+0	0	0+0	0	0+0	0
2	DF	(Namibia) NAM	Ryan Nyambe	33	0	25+4	0	1+0	0	3+0	0
3	DF	(Republic of Ireland) IRL	Derrick Williams	29	0	23+4	0	0+1	0	1+0	0
5	DF	(England) ENG	Jack Rodwell	22	1	16+5	1	0+0	0	1+0	0
14	DF	(Scotland) SCO	Charlie Mulgrew(C)	31	10	28+1	10	1+0	0	1+0	0
17	DF	(England) ENG	Amari'i Bell	43	3	35+3	3	2+0	0	3+0	0
26	DF	(Republic of Ireland) IRL	Darragh Lenihan	38	3	34+0	2	2+0	1	2+0	0
38	DF	(England) ENG	Tyler Magloire	2	0	2+0	0	0+0	0	0+0	0
4	MF	(England) ENG	Harrison Reed (on loan from Southampton)	36	3	28+5	3	1+1	0	0+1	0
6	MF	(England) ENG	Richie Smallwood	33	0	29+3	0	1+0	0	0+0	0
8	MF	(England) ENG	Joe Rothwell	37	2	13+20	2	0+1	0	3+0	0
11	MF	(England) ENG	Harry Chapman	2	0	0+2	0	0+0	0	0+0	0
18	MF	(England) ENG	Jacob Davenport	1	0	0+1	0	0+0	0	0+0	0
22	MF	(England) ENG	Ben Gladwin	0	0	0+0	0	0+0	0	0+0	0
23	MF	(England) ENG	Bradley Dack	45	18	40+2	15	1+1	1	1+0	2
27	MF	(England) ENG	Lewis Travis	31	1	19+7	1	2+0	0	2+1	0
29	MF	(Northern Ireland) NIR	Corry Evans	36	0	33+2	0	1+0	0	0+0	0
31	MF	(Jamaica) JAM	Elliott Bennett	42	1	38+2	1	2+0	0	0+0	0
32	MF	(Scotland) SCO	Craig Conway	26	2	9+12	1	1+1	0	3+0	1
39	MF	(England) ENG	John Buckley	2	0	0+2	0	0+0	0	0+0	0
7	FW	(England) ENG	Adam Armstrong	48	9	31+13	5	2+0	1	2+0	3
9	FW	(England) ENG	Dominic Samuel	3	0	1+1	0	0+0	0	0+1	0
10	FW	(England) ENG	Danny Graham	46	16	37+6	15	2+0	0	1+0	1
19	FW	(England) ENG	Ben Brereton	28	1	4+21	1	1+1	0	1+0	0
24	FW	(England) ENG	Joe Nuttall	18	3	2+13	2	0+1	0	1+1	1
34	FW	(England) ENG	Daniel Butterworth	3	0	0+1	0	0+0	0	0+2	0
Players out on loan:
25	DF	(England) ENG	Paul Downing (on loan at Doncaster Rovers)	4	1	3+0	0	0+0	0	1+0	1
30	DF	(England) ENG	Sam Hart (on loan at Southend United)	0	0	0+0	0	0+0	0	0+0	0
33	GK	(England) ENG	Andrew Fisher (on loan at FC United)	0	0	0+0	0	0+0	0	0+0	0
35	DF	(England) ENG	Joe Grayson (on loan at Grimsby Town)	1	0	0+0	0	0+0	0	1+0	0
	DF	(England) ENG	Matthew Platt (on loan at Southport)	0	0	0+0	0	0+0	0	0+0	0
	DF	(England) ENG	Scott Wharton (on loan at Bury)	0	0	0+0	0	0+0	0	0+0	0
	MF	(Northern Ireland) NIR	Brad Lyons (on loan at St Mirren)	0	0	0+0	0	0+0	0	0+0	0
	FW	(Wales) WAL	Lewis Mansell (on loan at Partick Thistle)	0	0	0+0	0	0+0	0	0+0	0
Players that played for Blackburn Rovers this season that have left the club:
16	DF	(Scotland) SCO	Paul Caddis	1	0	0+0	0	0+0	0	1+0	0
11	MF	(England) ENG	Peter Whittingham	1	0	0+0	0	0+0	0	0+1	0
45	MF	(England) ENG	Kasey Palmer (on loan from Chelsea)	17	3	10+4	1	0+0	0	2+1	2
28	MF	(England) ENG	Willem Tomlinson	1	0	0+0	0	0+0	0	0+1	0

=== Goalscorers ===
As of 5 May 2019

Rank	No.	Pos.	Name	League	FA Cup	EFL Cup	Total
1	23	MF	(England) Bradley Dack	15	1	2	18
2	10	FW	(England) Danny Graham	15	0	1	16
3	14	DF	(Scotland) Charlie Mulgrew	10	0	0	10
4	7	FW	(England) Adam Armstrong	5	1	3	9
5	4	MF	(England) Harrison Reed	3	0	0	3
=	17	DF	(England) Amari'i Bell	3	0	0	3
=	24	FW	(England) Joe Nuttall	2	0	1	3
=	26	DF	(Republic of Ireland) Darragh Lenihan	2	1	0	3
=	45	MF	(England) Kasey Palmer	1	0	2	3
9	8	MF	(England) Joe Rothwell	2	0	0	2
=	32	MF	(Scotland) Craig Conway	1	0	1	2
12	5	DF	(England) Jack Rodwell	1	0	0	1
=	19	FW	(England) Ben Brereton	1	0	0	1
=	25	DF	(England) Paul Downing	0	0	1	1
=	27	MF	(England) Lewis Travis	1	0	0	1
=	31	MF	(Jamaica) Elliott Bennett	1	0	0	1
—	—	—	Own goal	1	0	0	0
Total				64	3	11	78

== Transfers ==
=== Summer ===
==== Transfers in ====
Date from	Position	Nationality	Name	From	Fee	Ref.
1 July 2018	CM	(England)	Joe Rothwell	Oxford United	Undisclosed	
1 July 2018	CM	(England)	Sam Durrant	Liverpool	Undisclosed	
2 July 2018	CM	(England)	Jacob Davenport	Manchester City	Undisclosed	
6 August 2018	CF	(England)	Adam Armstrong	Newcastle United	£1,750,000	
23 August 2018	CM	(England)	Jack Rodwell	Sunderland	Free transfer	

Total outgoing: +/- ~£ 1,750,000+

==== Transfers out ====
Date from	Position	Nationality	Name	To	Fee	Ref.
30 June 2018	GK	(England)	Matthew Campbell	Free agent	End of contract	
30 June 2018	CM	(England)	Matthew Chan	Free agent	End of contract	
30 June 2018	GK	(Republic of Ireland)	Aaron Dillon	Free agent	End of contract	
30 June 2018	RM	(England)	Callum Dolan	Free agent	End of contract	
30 June 2018	CB	(England)	Ben Donnelly-Blackburn	Free agent	End of contract	
30 June 2018	LM	(England)	Liam Feeney	Blackpool	End of contract	
30 June 2018	CB	(England)	Frank Jones	Free agent	End of contract	
30 June 2018	CF	(England)	Brad Lynch	Free agent	End of contract	
30 June 2018	CB	(England)	Elliott Ward	Notts County	End of contract	
31 August 2018	RB	(Scotland)	Paul Caddis	Bradford City	Mutual consent	
31 August 2018	CM	(England)	Peter Whittingham	Free agent	Mutual consent	

Total incoming: +/- ~£ 0

==== Loans in ====
Date from	Position	Nationality	Name	From	Length	Ref.
30 July 2018	AM	(England)	Kasey Palmer	Chelsea	Season Long (Recalled 9 Jan 2019)	
27 August 2018	CM	(England)	Harrison Reed	Southampton	Season Long	
28 August 2018	CF	(England)	Ben Brereton	Nottingham Forest	Initial Loan until January	
31 August 2018	FW	(England)	Mitchel Candlin	Walsall	Initial Loan until January (Recalled)	
4 September 2018	CM	(Northern Ireland)	Brad Lyons	(Northern Ireland) Coleraine	Initial Loan until January	

==== Loans out ====
Date from	Position	Nationality	Name	To	Length	Ref.
22 July 2018	DF	(England)	Scott Wharton	Lincoln City	Season Long (Recalled)	
3 August 2018	DF	(England)	Matthew Platt	Accrington Stanley	Season Long (recalled)	
30 August 2018	DF	(England)	Sam Hart	Rochdale	Season Long (recalled)	
30 August 2018	MF	(England)	Lewis Hardcastle	Port Vale	Season Long (recalled)	
7 September 2018	CF	(Wales)	Lewis Mansell	FC United of Manchester	One Month (extended)	
7 September 2018	LB	(England)	Lewis Thompson	FC United of Manchester	One Month (extended) (recalled)	
21 September 2018	LB	(England)	Jack Doyle	Maidstone United	Three Months (cut short)	
28 September 2018	GK	(England)	Oliver Byrne	Bamber Bridge	One Month	
26 October 2018	GK	(England)	Charlie Albinson	Warrington Town	One Month (extended)	

=== Winter ===
==== Transfers in ====
Date from	Position	Nationality	Name	From	Fee	Ref.
4 January 2019	CF	(England)	Ben Brereton	Nottingham Forest	Undisclosed	
11 January 2019	CM	(Northern Ireland)	Brad Lyons	(Northern Ireland) Coleraine	Undisclosed	
28 January 2019	RW	(England)	Harry Chapman	Middlesbrough	Undisclosed	
30 January 2019	CB	(Gibraltar)	Louie Annesley	(Gibraltar) Lincoln Red Imps	Undisclosed	

Total outgoing: +/- ~£

==== Transfers out ====
Date from	Position	Nationality	Name	To	Fee	Ref.
31 January 2019	GK	(England)	Oliver Byrne	Stevenage	Undisclosed	
31 January 2019	CM	(England)	Willem Tomlinson	Mansfield Town	Mutual Consent	
31 January 2019	FW	(England)	Okera Simmonds	Accrington Stanley	Mutual Consent	
28 March 2019	CM	(England)	Lewis Hardcastle	Barrow	Free	
1 April 2019	GK	(England)	Ben Winterbottom	Liverpool	Undisclosed	

Total incoming: +/- ~£ 0

==== Loans in ====
Date from	Position	Nationality	Name	From	Length	Ref.

==== Loans out ====
Date from	Position	Nationality	Name	To	Length	Ref.
14 January 2019	GK	(England)	Oliver Byrne	Stevenage	31 January 2019	
15 January 2019	LB	(England)	Sam Hart	Southend United	Season-Long	
15 January 2019	CM	(Northern Ireland)	Brad Lyons	(Scotland) St Mirren	Season-Long	
16 January 2019	CB	(England)	Sam Barnes	Marine	One Month (extended)	
16 January 2019	FW	(Wales)	Lewis Mansell	(Scotland) Partick Thistle	Season-Long	
18 January 2019	CB	(England)	Joe Grayson	Grimsby Town	Season-Long	
23 January 2019	CB	(England)	Scott Wharton	Bury	Season-Long	
24 January 2019	CB	(England)	Paul Downing	Doncaster Rovers	Season-Long	
8 February 2019	GK	(England)	Andy Fisher	FC United of Manchester	One Month (extended)	
8 February 2019	CM	(England)	Lewis Hardcastle	Barrow	One Month (extended)	
9 February 2019	CB	(England)	Matthew Platt	Southport	One Month (extended)	
