= Ben Brereton Díaz =

English footballer (born 1999)

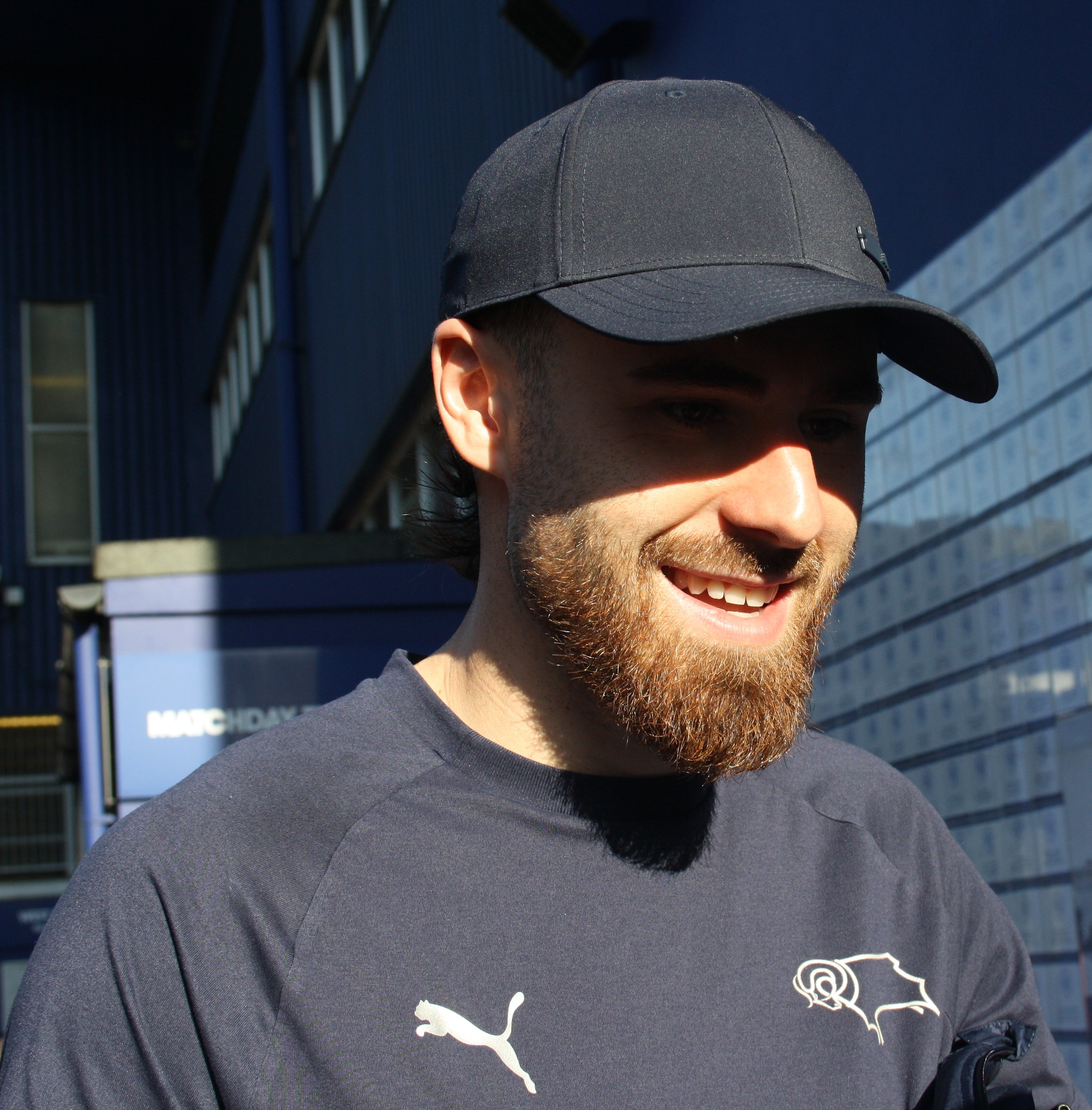
- Brereton Díaz with Derby County in 2026

Personal information
- Full name: Benjamin Anthony Brereton
- Date of birth: 18 April 1999 (age 27)
- Place of birth: Stoke-on-Trent, England
- Height: 6 ft 1 in (1.85 m)
- Positions: Forward; wide midfielder; attacking midfielder

Team information
- Current team: Sheffield United (on loan from Southampton)
- Number: 22

Youth career
- 2006–2013: Manchester United
- 2013–2015: Stoke City
- 2015–2017: Nottingham Forest

Senior career*
Years	Team	Apps	(Gls)
2017–2019	Nottingham Forest	53	(8)
2018–2019	→ Blackburn Rovers (loan)	16	(0)
2019–2023	Blackburn Rovers	144	(45)
2023–2024	Villarreal	14	(0)
2024	→ Sheffield United (loan)	14	(6)
2024–	Southampton	11	(0)
2025	→ Sheffield United (loan)	17	(4)
2025–2026	→ Derby County (loan)	40	(7)
2026–	→ Sheffield United (loan)	14	(3)

International career^{‡}
2017–2018	England U19	18	(5)
2018	England U20	1	(0)
2021–	Chile	45	(10)
- * Club domestic league appearances and goals as of 22:30, 21 November 2026 (UTC) ‡ National team caps and goals as of 21:30, 6 October 2026 (UTC)

Benjamin Anthony Brereton (born 18 April 1999), known as Ben Brereton Díaz, is a professional footballer who plays as a forward or wide midfielder for EFL Championship club Sheffield United, on loan from EFL Championship club Southampton. Born in England, he plays for the Chile national team.

Brereton Díaz began his club career with Nottingham Forest, making his senior debut in 2017. He moved to Blackburn Rovers in 2018, initially on loan before joining them on a permanent transfer in 2019. In 2023, he signed for Villarreal in Spain's La Liga, but did not score any goals over 20 games and left on loan for Sheffield United and then permanently to Southampton. He has since had loan spells at Sheffield United and Derby County.

Born in England, Brereton Díaz represented his birth country at under-19 and under-20 level. Qualifying through his mother, he was selected for the senior Chile team in 2021, and played at the Copa América in 2021 and 2024.

== Early life ==
Brereton Díaz was born in Stoke-on-Trent, Staffordshire and attended Blythe Bridge High School. He was born to Martin Brereton, an English policeman and former amateur football player in Stoke-on-Trent area and District Sunday League, and Andrea Brereton (née Díaz), born in Concepción, Chile, who worked at Churchill China.

== Club career ==
=== Early career ===
From the ages of seven to 14, Brereton Díaz was in the youth set-up at Manchester United. In 2013, he moved to his hometown club, Stoke City.

=== Nottingham Forest ===
Brereton Díaz signed for Championship club Nottingham Forest in the summer of 2015 after his release from Stoke City. Following his impressive form in the club's academy teams, with 15 goals in 20 appearances, he signed a new contract with the club on 31 December 2016. Brereton Díaz made his first-team debut for Forest on 25 January 2017 as a 76th-minute substitute during a 2–0 loss to Leeds United. He scored his first goal on 4 February, netting in injury-time against Aston Villa to give Forest a 2–1 victory.

On 27 March 2017, having made ten appearances and scoring against Fulham and Brentford, Brereton Díaz was nominated for the Championship Apprentice of the Year award. He was one of three players nominated, the others named as Lloyd Kelly of Bristol City and Sheffield Wednesday's George Hirst. Brereton Díaz was announced as the winner at the EFL Awards at the Hilton Hotel, Park Lane, on 9 April. He signed a long-term contract with Forest on 22 June 2017, keeping him under contract at the club until June 2021.

=== Blackburn Rovers ===
On 28 August 2018, Brereton Díaz signed for Blackburn Rovers on loan, with a view to making the transfer permanent in the January 2019 transfer window. On 4 January 2019, the move was made permanent for an undisclosed fee, believed to be £7m.

Brereton Díaz was awarded the Championship Player of the Month award for September 2021 after scoring six goals in five matches, including a hat-trick against Cardiff City. After the 2021–22 season, when he scored 22 goals as Blackburn finished 8th, the club triggered a one-year contract extension for Brereton Díaz.

In the 2022–23 season, Brereton Díaz scored 14 goals as Blackburn finished seventh, just outside the playoff positions on goal difference. His final game of the season was against Millwall, in which he scored two goals as Blackburn came back from 3–1 down to win 4–3.

On 8 May 2023, it was confirmed that Brereton Díaz would be leaving Blackburn in the summer.

=== Villarreal ===
On 4 July 2023, following the expiry of his contract at Blackburn, La Liga club Villarreal announced the signing of Brereton Díaz for a four-year contract on a free transfer. He played 20 games across all competitions, starting 6 and playing an average of 28.5 minutes per match, and did not score any goals.

==== First loan to Sheffield United ====
On 5 January 2024, Brereton Díaz returned to England, joining Premier League side Sheffield United on loan until the end of the season. He made his debut for the club as a second-half substitute in a 4–0 victory over Gillingham in the FA Cup. He scored his first goal for the club on his Premier League debut against West Ham United on 21 January; the match finished in a 2–2 draw. He totalled 6 goals in 14 league appearances for the Blades, who were relegated.

=== Southampton ===
On 30 July 2024, Brereton Díaz joined Premier League club Southampton on a four-year contract for an estimated fee of £7 million. He made his debut for the club on 17 August in a 1–0 away defeat against Newcastle United. On 14 September, after a 3–0 loss to Manchester United, he surpassed Marvin Sordell's record of 17 Premier League appearances with no win. He was one of several first-team players moved into the under-21 team by manager Russell Martin. He did not score any goals in 13 league and cup appearances for the Saints.

==== Second loan to Sheffield United ====
On 20 January 2025, Brereton Díaz returned to Sheffield United of the Championship on loan for the remainder of the 2024–25 season with an option to buy in the summer. Ben Brereton Díaz went on to score 4 times in his second spell with the blades.

==== Loan to Derby County ====
On 31 August 2025, Brereton Díaz joined Derby County on a season-long loan. Brereton Díaz made his Derby debut on 13 September 2025 in a 1–0 win at West Bromwich Albion. On 27 September, Brereton Díaz scored his first goal for Derby County in a 1–1 draw at Wrexham. Brereton Díaz had a difficult start to this Derby career, with the Wrexham goal in September being his only goal involvement in 2025. In January 2026 and with a change in the system Derby played, Brereton Díaz had an upturn in form, scoring two goals and creating two assists in the month. Brereton Díaz made 41 appearances during his loan spell at Derby County, scoring eight times. Derby head coach John Eustace stated a desire to make his move to Derby permanent in the summer.

==== Third loan to Sheffield United ====
On 28 August 2026, Brereton Díaz returned to Sheffield United on a season-long loan.

== International career ==
Born in England to a Chilean mother, Brereton Díaz was eligible to play for both nations. He played age-group games for England but switched allegiances to Chile, making his senior debut in 2021.

=== England ===
In March 2017, Brereton Díaz received his first call-up to an England side after being named in the under-19s squad for games against their Spanish, Norwegian and Belarusian counterparts. Having started his side's 3–0 defeat of Spain and coming off the bench for the 5–1 beating of Belarus, manager Keith Downing praised his performances and ease at settling into the squad.

Brereton Díaz was subsequently called up to represent England at the 2017 UEFA European Under-19 Championship. In the group stage, he scored the winner against the Netherlands and twice against Germany. Brereton Díaz was a second-half substitute during the victory against Portugal in the final. His total of three goals meant Brereton Díaz was joint top goalscorer at the tournament. Brereton Díaz also played at the 2018 UEFA European Under-19 Championship, scoring his only goal of the tournament in the opening group stage match against Turkey.

=== Chile ===
After noticing he was half Chilean whilst playing Football Manager, a group of fans began a social media campaign to get Brereton Díaz picked for Chile. This was subsequently picked up by the national media and on 24 May 2021, Brereton Díaz was called up to the Chile squad for the first time by manager Martín Lasarte for the 2022 FIFA World Cup qualifiers against Argentina and Bolivia. He was subsequently included in Chile's squad for the 2021 Copa América in Brazil, and on 14 June he made his debut as a substitute against Argentina in a 1–1 draw. On 18 June, he was handed his first start as he scored his first international goal for La Roja, against Bolivia in a 1–0 win.

In Chile's failed 2022 World Cup qualification campaign, Brereton Díaz scored in consecutive home wins over Paraguay and Venezuela in October 2021. After the latter, he presented his shirt to former international and Real Madrid and Inter Milan striker Iván Zamorano.

On 16 June 2023, Brereton Díaz scored his first international hat-trick, in a 5–0 friendly win over the Dominican Republic in Viña del Mar; it was his mother's first time watching him for her country, and the performance brought her to tears of joy. In March 2024, he was dropped by Chilean coach Ricardo Gareca due to his lack of Spanish language skills, but later in June he was called up for the 2024 Copa América. He played all three games as the team were eliminated as third place in their group in the United States.

== Personal life ==
Brereton Díaz first started using the name Ben Brereton Díaz when he debuted for Chile, as Spanish names use both the father's surname and mother's surname. He then announced in July 2021 he would use the name at club level as well. Since playing for the national side, Brereton Díaz said he has been taking Spanish lessons three times a week and learning the national anthem.

== Career statistics ==
=== Club ===
As of match played 21 November 2026

Appearances and goals by club, season and competition
Club	Season	League			National cup (Note: Includes FA Cup, Copa del Rey)		League cup (Note: Includes EFL Cup)		Europe		Other		Total	
Club	Season	Division	Apps	Goals	Apps	Goals	Apps	Goals	Apps	Goals	Apps	Goals	Apps	Goals
Nottingham Forest	2016–17	Championship	18	3	—		—		—		—		18	3
Nottingham Forest	2017–18	Championship	35	5	2	1	2	0	—		—		39	6
Nottingham Forest	Total		53	8	2	1	2	0	—		—		57	9
Blackburn Rovers	2018–19	Championship	25	1	2	0	1	0	—		—		28	1
Blackburn Rovers	2019–20	Championship	15	1	1	0	1	0	—		—		17	1
Blackburn Rovers	2020–21	Championship	40	7	2	0	1	0	—		—		43	7
Blackburn Rovers	2021–22	Championship	37	22	0	0	1	0	—		—		38	22
Blackburn Rovers	2022–23	Championship	43	14	4	1	3	1	—		—		50	16
Blackburn Rovers	Total		160	45	9	1	7	1	—		—		176	47
Villarreal	2023–24	La Liga	14	0	1	0	—		5 (Note: Appearances in UEFA Europa League)	0	—		20	0
Sheffield United (loan)	2023–24	Premier League	14	6	2	0	—		—		—		16	6
Southampton	2024–25	Premier League	10	0	0	0	3	0	—		—		13	0
Southampton	2025–26	Championship	0	0	0	0	2	0	—		—		2	0
Southampton	2026–27	Championship	1	0	0	0	1	0	—		—		2	0
Southampton	Total		11	0	0	0	6	0	—		—		17	0
Sheffield United (loan)	2024–25	Championship	17	4	—		—		—		1 (Note: Appearance in Championship play-offs)	0	18	4
Derby County (loan)	2025–26	Championship	40	7	1	1	—		—		—		41	8
Sheffield United (loan)	2026–27	Championship	14	3	0	0	1	0	—		—		15	3
Career total			323	73	15	3	16	1	5	0	1	0	360	77

=== International ===
As of match played 6 October 2026

Appearances and goals by national team and year
National team	Year	Apps	Goals
Chile	2021	9	3
Chile	2022	8	1
Chile	2023	10	3
Chile	2024	8	0
Chile	2025	5	2
Chile	2026	5	1
Total		45	10

As of match played 27 March 2026. Chile score listed first, score column indicates score after each Brereton goal.

International goals by date, venue, cap, opponent, score, result and competition
No.	Date	Venue	Cap	Opponent	Score	Result	Competition
1	18 June 2021	Arena Pantanal, Cuiabá, Brazil	2	Bolivia	1–0	1–0	2021 Copa América
2	10 October 2021	Estadio San Carlos de Apoquindo, Santiago, Chile	7	Paraguay	1–0	2–0	2022 FIFA World Cup qualification
3	14 October 2021	Estadio San Carlos de Apoquindo, Santiago, Chile	8	Venezuela	3–0	3–0	2022 FIFA World Cup qualification
4	27 January 2022	Estadio Zorros del Desierto, Calama, Chile	10	Argentina	1–1	1–2	2022 FIFA World Cup qualification
5	16 June 2023	Estadio Sausalito, Viña del Mar, Chile	20	Dominican Republic	1–0	5–0	Friendly
6	16 June 2023	Estadio Sausalito, Viña del Mar, Chile	20	Dominican Republic	2–0	5–0	Friendly
7	16 June 2023	Estadio Sausalito, Viña del Mar, Chile	20	Dominican Republic	3–0	5–0	Friendly
8	10 October 2025	Estadio Bicentenario de La Florida, Santiago, Chile	38	Peru	1–1	2–1	Friendly
9	15 November 2025	Fisht Olympic Stadium, Sochi, Russia	39	Russia	2–0	2–0	Friendly
10	27 March 2026	Eden Park, Auckland, New Zealand	41	Cape Verde	1–0	4–2	2026 FIFA Series

== Honours ==
England U19

- UEFA European Under-19 Championship: 2017

Individual

- UEFA European Under-19 Championship Golden Boot: 2017
- EFL Championship Apprentice of the Year: 2016–17
- EFL Championship Player of the Month: September 2021
- Blackburn Rovers Players' Player of the Year: 2021–22
- Junior Rovers Player of the Year: 2021–22
- Chilean Footballer of the Year: 2022
- PFA Team of the Year: 2021–22 Championship
