= Ian Poveda =

Colombia international footballer (born 2000)

Personal information
- Full name: Ian Carlo Poveda-Ocampo
- Date of birth: 9 February 2000 (age 26)
- Place of birth: Southwark, London, England
- Height: 5 ft 6 in (1.67 m)
- Positions: Attacking midfielder; winger

Team information
- Current team: Atlético Nacional
- Number: 99

Youth career
- 2007–2010: Chelsea
- 2010–2012: Arsenal
- 2012–2014: Barcelona
- 2014–2016: Brentford
- 2016–2019: Manchester City

Senior career*
Years	Team	Apps	(Gls)
2019–2020	Manchester City	0	(0)
2020–2024	Leeds United	25	(0)
2021–2022	→ Blackburn Rovers (loan)	10	(1)
2022–2023	→ Blackpool (loan)	24	(2)
2024	→ Sheffield Wednesday (loan)	10	(0)
2024–2026	Sunderland	6	(0)
2026	Inter Bogotá	9	(3)
2026–	Atlético Nacional	8	(2)

International career^{‡}
2015–2016	England U16	9	(1)
2016	England U17	3	(0)
2018	England U18	6	(3)
2018–2019	England U19	9	(2)
2019–2021	England U20	4	(3)
2023–	Colombia	2	(0)
- * Club domestic league appearances and goals as of 15:00, 24 August 2026 (UTC) ‡ National team caps and goals as of 16 December 2023

Ian Carlo Poveda-Ocampo (born 9 February 2000) is a professional footballer who plays as an attacking midfielder or winger for Categoría Primera A club Atlético Nacional. Born in England, he plays for the Colombia national team.

He is a product of the Manchester City, Barcelona and Brentford youth systems and has been capped by England at youth level.

== Club career ==
Poveda started his career in the academy at Chelsea, where he was part of the same age group as Rhian Brewster, Marc Guéhi, Conor Gallagher and Reece James, before being poached by Arsenal and then Barcelona. Poveda was reported to have had a brief spell with Malaga-based side Puerto Malagueno between his stints at Arsenal and Barcelona, but did not play for, or officially register, with them.

=== Brentford ===
Poveda joined the academy at Brentford during the 2014 off-season, having left Barcelona due to the club being prosecuted for signing minors illegally. He was a member of the U15 squad which finished as runners-up in the Junior Vase at the 2015 Milk Cup and progressed to make 15 appearances and score three goals for the youth team during the 2015–16 season, which also included three appearances for the Development Squad. Poveda departed Brentford in July 2016, due to the closure of the club's academy.

=== Manchester City ===
On 18 July 2016, Poveda joined the academy at Premier League club Manchester City for an undisclosed fee and commenced a two-year scholarship. He was a member of the U18 team which finished as runners-up to Chelsea in the 2016–17 FA Youth Cup. Poveda took part in Manchester City's First Team's pre-season tour of the United States in the summer of 2018. After five EFL Trophy appearances and two goals for the U21 team during the first half of the 2018–19 season, Poveda made his senior debut for the club with a start in a 1–0 EFL Cup semi-final second leg win over Burton Albion on 23 January 2019.

Poveda was named on the bench for Manchester City in their 3–1 EFL Cup victory over Southampton in October 2019, with Pep Guardiola personally apologising for not bringing Poveda on after the game, with the midfielder set to come on before a goal from Southampton changed his in-game substitution. In November 2019, Poveda was called up to the Manchester City squad for their Champions League fixture against Atalanta.

In January 2020, Poveda held talks with Serie A club Torino and Championship side Leeds United, with contact also from Bundesliga side TSG Hoffenheim ahead of a possible move in the January window.

=== Leeds United ===
On 24 January 2020, Poveda signed for Leeds United on a four-and-a-half-year contract until June 2024 for an undisclosed fee and was assigned the number 7 shirt. Poveda stated that he was very excited to work under his new manager Marcelo Bielsa. He made his Leeds debut on 21 June, as a second-half substitute in a 2–0 Championship defeat at Cardiff City.

After the English professional football season was paused in March 2020 due to the impact of the COVID-19 pandemic on association football, the season was resumed during June, where Poveda earned promotion with Leeds to the Premier League and also become the EFL Championship Champions for the 2019–20 season in July after the successful resumption of the season.

His first start of the 2020–21 season came on 16 September 2020 for Premier League Leeds in a 1–1 draw against Hull City in the EFL Cup. He made his Premier League debut in a 1–0 away win over Sheffield United on 27 September 2020. Poveda featured sixteen times for Leeds throughout the 2020–21 season.

Poveda was released by Leeds in June 2024 at the conclusion of his contract.

==== Loan to Blackburn Rovers ====
On 23 August 2021, Poveda joined Championship club Blackburn Rovers on a season-long loan. Poveda scored the first goal of his career on 6 November, scoring the equaliser in an eventual 3–1 home win over Sheffield United.

On 20 November, Poveda was taken off in the 44th minute of Blackburn's 1–1 draw with Bristol City after sustaining an injury to his left ankle. Blackburn later confirmed that following a scan, Poveda suffered both a fracture and ligament damage in his left ankle which would see the player ruled out for a significant amount of time.

==== Loan to Blackpool ====
On 27 August 2022, Poveda joined Championship side Blackpool on a season-long loan. On 16 March, Poveda scored his first goal for Blackpool in new manager Mick McCarthy's first win as manager.

==== Loan to Sheffield Wednesday ====
On 1 February 2024, Poveda joined Championship side Sheffield Wednesday on loan for the remainder of the season. He made his debut the following weekend in the 4–0 defeat against Huddersfield Town, coming off the bench.

=== Sunderland ===
On 25 July 2024, following his release from Leeds, Championship side Sunderland signed Poveda on a three-year deal with the option to extend for an additional year. He made his debut in a 3–1 away win on 31 August 2024 against Portsmouth, coming off the bench as a substitute.

=== Internacional de Bogotá ===
Poveda left Sunderland on a free transfer to Internacional de Bogotá, on 2 March 2026. In August 2026, he joined fellow Liga DIMAYOR side Atlético Nacional, providing an assist on his debut.

== International career ==
Poveda is eligible to play for England and Colombia at international level. He won his maiden call into the England U16 squad in August 2015. He was a member of the 2015 Nike International Tournament-winning squad. He was a member of the U17 squad which won the 2016 Croatia Cup. In March 2018, Poveda received his first international call-up for 18 months, for U18 friendlies versus Qatar, Belarus and a mixed-age Argentina team. He appeared in each match and scored three goals. He also graduated to the U19 team in 2018.

On 4 October 2019, Poveda was included in the England U20 squad for the first time and made his debut as a 72nd-minute substitute during a 2–2 draw away to Italy in the U20 Elite League.

In December 2023, Poveda was called up to the Colombia national team for the first time.

== Personal life ==
Poveda was born in London, England, to Colombian parents. During his youth years, he played youth tournaments for Southwark schoolboys alongside Jadon Sancho and Reiss Nelson who also became professional footballers.

== Style of play ==
Poveda plays predominantly as a winger or a forward, Poveda is capable of playing on both flanks or through the middle as an attacking midfielder or as a false 9. Manchester City's website described his style as 'Nimble and fleet-footed', with the Manchester Evening News describing him as having 'trickery and an eye for goal'.

Poveda describes himself as 'an attacking player, I can play right wing, left wing or in attacking midfield, I like to dribble with the ball, link up the play, score goals, create chances, assist and I work hard for the team'.

Poveda said in December 2019 that Raheem Sterling was a big brother figure to him at Manchester City helping him with positioning and advice in training.

== Career statistics ==
=== Club ===
As of match played 17 February 2025

Appearances and goals by club, season and competition
Club	Season	League			FA Cup		League Cup		Other		Total	
Club	Season	Division	Apps	Goals	Apps	Goals	Apps	Goals	Apps	Goals	Apps	Goals
Manchester City	2018–19	Premier League	0	0	0	0	1	0	0	0	1	0
Manchester City U21	2018–19	—	—		—		—		5 (Note: Appearances in EFL Trophy)	2	5	2
Manchester City U21	2019–20	—	—		—		—		1	0	1	0
Leeds United	2019–20	Championship	4	0	—		—		—		4	0
Leeds United	2020–21	Premier League	14	0	1	0	1	0	—		16	0
Leeds United	2021–22	Premier League	0	0	0	0	0	0	—		0	0
Leeds United	2023–24	Championship	7	0	2	0	1	0	—		10	0
Leeds United	Total		25	0	3	0	3	0	6	2	37	2
Leeds United U21	2020–21	—	—		—		—		1	0	1	0
Blackburn Rovers (loan)	2021–22	Championship	10	1	0	0	0	0	—		10	1
Blackpool (loan)	2022–23	Championship	24	2	2	1	0	0	0	0	26	3
Sheffield Wednesday (loan)	2023–24	Championship	10	0	0	0	0	0	0	0	10	0
Sunderland	2024–25	Championship	6	0	0	0	—		—		6	0
Sunderland	2025–26	Premier League	0	0	0	0	0	0	—		0	0
Sunderland	Total		6	0	0	0	0	0	0	0	6	0
Career total			75	3	5	1	3	0	7	2	90	6

=== International ===
As of match played 16 December 2023

Appearances and goals by national team and year
National team	Year	Apps	Goals
Colombia	2023	2	0
Total		2	0

== Honours ==
Leeds United

- EFL Championship: 2019–20

England U16

- Nike International Tournament: 2015

England U17

- Croatia Cup: 2016
