= John Buckley (footballer, born 1999) =

English footballer

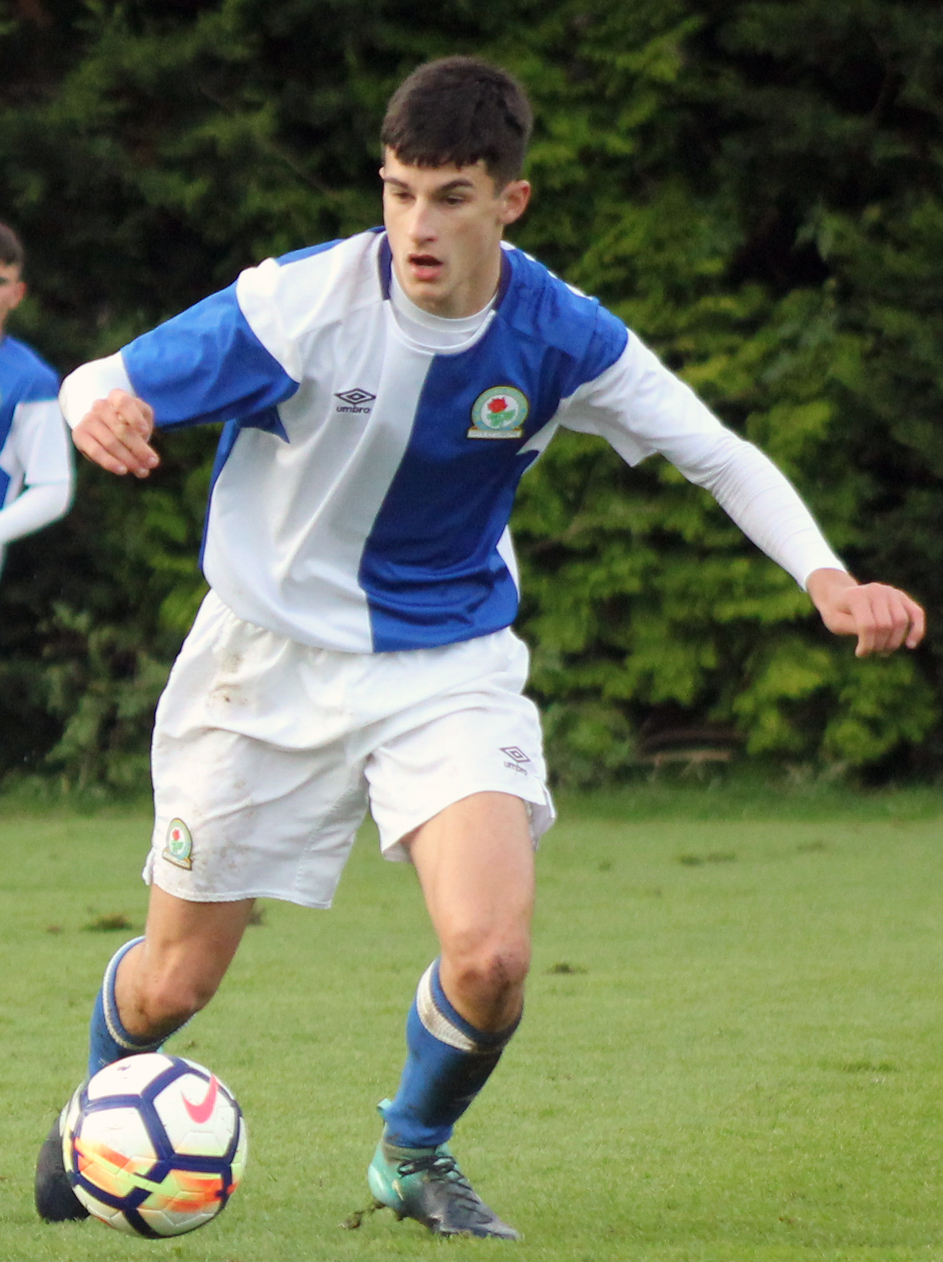
- Buckley in action for Blackburn Rovers U18s in November 2017

Personal information
- Full name: John Keaton Buckley
- Date of birth: 13 October 1999 (age 27)
- Place of birth: Manchester, England
- Height: 5 ft 9 in (1.75 m)
- Position: Midfielder

Team information
- Current team: Al-Kholood
- Number: 6

Youth career
- 2006–2019: Blackburn Rovers

Senior career*
| Years | Team | Apps | (Gls) |
| 2019–2025 | Blackburn Rovers | 147 | (6) |
| 2023–2024 | → Sheffield Wednesday (loan) | 13 | (0) |
| 2025– | Al-Kholood | 26 | (3) |
- * Club domestic league appearances and goals as of 15:15, 27 April 2026 (UTC)

John Keaton Buckley (born 13 October 1999) is an English professional footballer who plays as a midfielder for Saudi Pro League club Al-Kholood.

== Career ==
=== Blackburn Rovers ===
Born in Manchester, Greater Manchester, Buckley joined the academy of then Premier League club Blackburn Rovers at the age of six in 2006. He signed his scholarship with Rovers in June 2015 before agreeing to his first professional contract on 26 January 2018, agreeing a deal that would run until 30 June 2020.

On 1 March 2019, Buckley signed a new three-year deal with Blackburn which would run until 30 June 2022. Just over two weeks later, Buckley made his professional debut for Blackburn on 16 March, with the club being defeated 4–2 in its EFL Championship fixture against Sheffield Wednesday.

On 2 November, Buckley scored the first senior goal of his career in his club's 2–1 win against Sheffield Wednesday at Ewood Park. His first goal came against the same club the player had made his professional debut against at the beginning of the year.

On 8 March 2020, Buckley received the first red card of his professional career, with the youngster being sent off in the 93rd minute against Derby County. In his first full season with the club's first-team, Buckley made 23 competitive appearances for Blackburn, scoring twice.

==== Sheffield Wednesday (loan) ====
On 1 September 2023, Buckley joined Sheffield Wednesday on a season-long loan. He made his debut coming off the bench against Ipswich Town on 16 September 2023. On 2 January 2024, he was recalled from his loan spell to continue his rehabilitation at Blackburn following shoulder surgery, having played a total of 13 times for Sheffield Wednesday.

=== Al Kholood ===
On 26 August 2025, Buckley joined Al-Kholood. He scored on his debut in a 2–1 loss to Al-Ettifaq.

== Career statistics ==
As of match played 12 August 2025

Appearances and goals by club, season and competition
| Club | Season | League | | | FA Cup | | EFL Cup | | Total | |
| Club | Season | Division | Apps | Goals | Apps | Goals | Apps | Goals | Apps | Goals |
|---|---|---|---|---|---|---|---|---|---|---|
| Blackburn Rovers | 2018–19 | Championship | 2 | 0 | 0 | 0 | 0 | 0 | 2 | 0 |
| Blackburn Rovers | 2019–20 | Championship | 20 | 2 | 1 | 0 | 2 | 0 | 23 | 2 |
| Blackburn Rovers | 2020–21 | Championship | 28 | 1 | 1 | 0 | 1 | 0 | 30 | 1 |
| Blackburn Rovers | 2021–22 | Championship | 42 | 3 | 1 | 0 | 1 | 0 | 44 | 3 |
| Blackburn Rovers | 2022–23 | Championship | 21 | 0 | 3 | 0 | 4 | 0 | 28 | 0 |
| Blackburn Rovers | 2023–24 | Championship | 11 | 0 | 1 | 0 | 2 | 3 | 14 | 3 |
| Blackburn Rovers | 2024–25 | Championship | 23 | 0 | 2 | 0 | 2 | 0 | 27 | 0 |
| Blackburn Rovers | 2025–26 | Championship | 0 | 0 | 0 | 0 | 1 | 0 | 1 | 0 |
| Blackburn Rovers | Total | | 147 | 6 | 9 | 0 | 13 | 3 | 169 | 9 |
| Sheffield Wednesday (loan) | 2023–24 | Championship | 13 | 0 | 0 | 0 | 0 | 0 | 13 | 0 |
| Career total | | | 160 | 6 | 9 | 0 | 13 | 3 | 182 | 9 |
