= Joe Rothwell =

English footballer (born 1995)

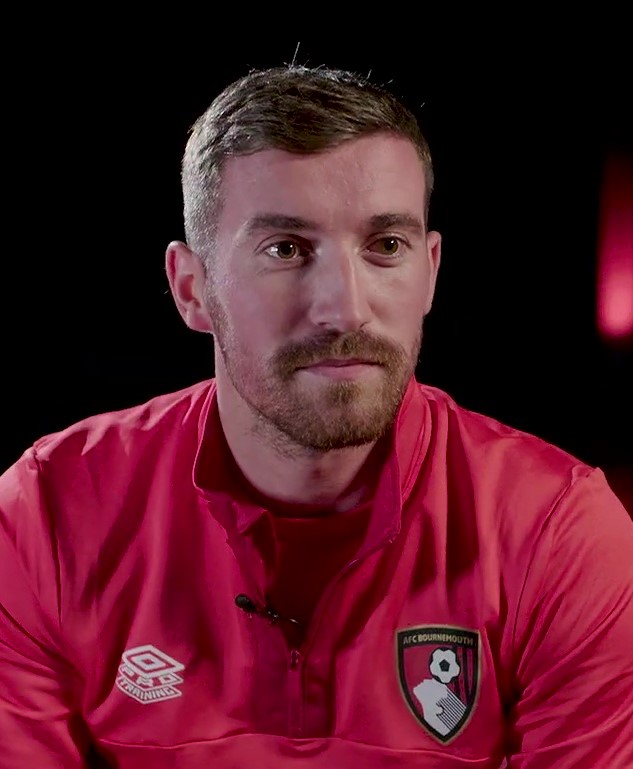
- Rothwell with AFC Bournemouth in 2022

Personal information
- Full name: Joseph Matthew Rothwell
- Date of birth: 11 January 1995 (age 31)
- Place of birth: Manchester, England
- Height: 6 ft 1 in (1.85 m)
- Position: Defensive midfielder

Team information
- Current team: Sheffield United
- Number: 7

Youth career
- 2001–2013: Manchester United

Senior career*
Years	Team	Apps	(Gls)
2013–2016	Manchester United	0	(0)
2015	→ Blackpool (loan)	3	(0)
2015	→ Barnsley (loan)	4	(0)
2016–2018	Oxford United	69	(6)
2018–2022	Blackburn Rovers	149	(10)
2022–2025	Bournemouth	31	(0)
2024	→ Southampton (loan)	16	(4)
2024–2025	→ Leeds United (loan)	36	(0)
2025–2026	Rangers	8	(0)
2026–	Sheffield United	17	(0)

International career
2011	England U16	7	(1)
2011	England U17	6	(0)
2013	England U19	1	(0)
2014	England U20	2	(0)
- * Club domestic league appearances and goals as of 15 October 2026 (UTC)

Joseph Matthew Rothwell (born 11 January 1995) is an English footballer who plays as a defensive midfielder for EFL Championship club Sheffield United.

Rothwell is a product of the Manchester United academy. He had loan spells at Blackpool and Barnsley before moving to Oxford United in 2016. Rothwell joined Blackburn Rovers in June 2018 and made 161 appearances in all competitions for the club. In June 2022, he moved to Bournemouth, spending time on loan at fellow English clubs Southampton and Leeds United. In July 2025, Rothwell joined Scottish club Rangers. He then moved to Sheffield United the following year.

Rothwall has previously represented England at youth level between 2011 and 2014.

== Club career ==
=== Manchester United ===
Having joined Manchester United's academy at the age of six, Rothwell signed professional terms with the club in the summer of 2013. On 26 July 2011, he scored twice in a 7–0 win over County Tyrone in the Milk Cup.

On 27 January 2015, Rothwell joined Blackpool, then in last place in the Championship, on loan for the remainder of the season. Four days later he was included in a professional matchday squad for the first time, remaining an unused substitute for Blackpool's 1–0 win over Brighton & Hove Albion at Bloomfield Road. A week later he made his debut as Blackpool lost 4–0 away to Norwich City, replacing Mark Waddington at half time. His first career start came on 24 February, playing the entirety of a defeat by the same score at Brentford, his last of three appearances for the club. Returning to Manchester United, he was named as a substitute for a first-team game against Watford in March 2016.

On 18 July 2015, Rothwell joined League One side Barnsley on a six-month loan. He played four League games (two as a substitute) and made one appearance in the opening round of the Football League Trophy, a competition Barnsley ultimately won, beating Oxford United.

=== Oxford United ===
On 12 July 2016, Rothwell joined Oxford on a two-year deal after turning down the offer of a new contract at Manchester United. He scored the first senior goal of his career in an FA Cup second-round replay against Macclesfield Town on 13 December 2016, a game which Oxford won 3–0. His first league goal came in a 5–1 win over Bury on 28 March 2017.

=== Blackburn Rovers ===
On 22 June 2018, Rothwell joined Blackburn Rovers for an undisclosed fee. He signed a three-year deal.

At the end of the 2021–22 season it was announced that Rothwell would be leaving the club upon the expiry of his contract.

=== AFC Bournemouth ===
On 25 June 2022, Rothwell joined Premier League club AFC Bournemouth on a free transfer, signing a four-year contract.

==== Southampton (loan) ====
On 15 January 2024, Rothwell joined Southampton on loan for the remainder of the 2023–24 season. Five days later, he made his first appearance for the club in a 1–3 victory against Swansea City, replacing Stuart Armstrong in the 76th minute. He scored his first two goals on 10 February 2024 for the club in a 5–3 victory against Huddersfield Town. Rothwell later received the Sky Bet Championship Goal of the Month for February for his first goal in that game. He was part of the team that earned promotion to the Premier League via the play-offs.

==== Leeds United (loan) ====
On 11 July 2024, Rothwell was transferred to EFL Championship side Leeds United in a season-long loan deal, helping gain promotion to the Premier League.

=== Rangers ===
On 2 July 2025, Rothwell joined Scottish Premiership side Rangers, signing a three-year contract. On 22 July 2025, he made his debut for Rangers in a UEFA Champions League qualifier against Panathinaikos at Ibrox Stadium.

=== Sheffield United ===
On 2 February 2026, Sheffield United signed Rothwell from Rangers for an undisclosed fee on an eighteen-month contract.

Rothwell made his debut on 9 February in a 2–1 defeat to Middlesbrough, coming on at half-time for Ollie Arblaster before receiving a straight red card in the 80th minute for a challenge on Alan Browne.

== International career ==
Rothwell has represented England's national youth teams. He played at under-16, under-17, under-19, and under-20 levels.

Rothwell is also eligible to play for Scotland. On 1 July 2025 he was quoted as saying, ""I've always said I'm more than open to the idea of playing for Scotland. My gran was Scottish and she'd be really proud if I was to do that."

== Career statistics ==
As of match played 14 October 2025

Appearances and goals by club, season and competition
Club	Season	League			FA Cup		League Cup		Other		Total	
Club	Season	Division	Apps	Goals	Apps	Goals	Apps	Goals	Apps	Goals	Apps	Goals
Blackpool (loan)	2014–15	Championship	3	0	0	0	0	0	—		3	0
Barnsley (loan)	2015–16	League One	4	0	0	0	2	0	1 (Note: Appearance in Football League Trophy)	0	7	0
Oxford United	2016–17	League One	33	1	4	1	1	0	7 (Note: Appearances in EFL Trophy)	0	45	2
Oxford United	2017–18	League One	36	5	1	0	1	0	3	1	41	6
Oxford United	Total		69	6	5	1	2	0	10	1	86	8
Blackburn Rovers	2018–19	Championship	33	2	1	0	3	0	—		37	2
Blackburn Rovers	2019–20	Championship	36	2	1	0	2	1	—		39	3
Blackburn Rovers	2021–21	Championship	39	3	1	0	2	0	—		42	3
Blackburn Rovers	2021–22	Championship	41	3	1	0	1	0	—		43	3
Blackburn Rovers	Total		149	10	4	0	8	1	—		161	11
Bournemouth	2022–23	Premier League	20	0	1	0	1	0	–		22	0
Bournemouth	2023–24	Premier League	11	0	0	0	2	1	–		13	1
Bournemouth	2024–25	Premier League	0	0	0	0	0	0	–		0	0
Bournemouth	Total		31	0	1	0	3	1	—		35	0
Southampton (loan)	2023–24	Championship	16	4	3	0	0	0	1 (Note: Appearance in Championship play-offs)	0	20	4
Leeds United (loan)	2024–25	Championship	36	0	2	0	1	0	0	0	39	0
Rangers	2025–26	Scottish Premiership	8	0	1	0	2	0	9 (Note: 6 Appearance in Champions League and 3 Appearances in Europa League)	0	20	0
Sheffield United	2025–26	Championship	10	0	0	0	0	0	0	0	10	0
Sheffield United	2026–27	Championship	7	0	0	0	3	0	0	0	10	0
Sheffield United	Total		17	0	0	0	3	0	0	0	20	0
Career total			333	20	16	1	20	2	21	1	391	24

== Honours ==
Oxford United

- EFL Trophy runner-up: 2016–17

Southampton

- EFL Championship play-offs: 2024

Leeds United

- EFL Championship: 2024–25
