= Sam Burns (footballer) =

English footballer (born 2002)

Personal information
- Date of birth: 9 August 2002 (age 24)
- Place of birth: Liverpool, England
- Position: Striker

Team information
- Current team: Warrington Rylands

Youth career
- Blackburn Rovers

Senior career*
Years	Team	Apps	(Gls)
2021–2023	Blackburn Rovers	0	(0)
2021	→ F.C. United of Manchester (loan)	4	(1)
2022	→ Scunthorpe United (loan)	15	(2)
2023	Panachaiki	0	(0)
2023	Bootle	5	(1)
2023–2024	Bury	16	(8)
2024	Warrington Rylands	9	(0)
2024–	Lower Breck	58	(31)
- * Club domestic league appearances and goals as of 15:07, 16 February 2026 (UTC)

Sam Burns (born 9 August 2002) is an English professional footballer who plays as a striker for Northern Premier League Division One West club Lower Breck.

== Career ==
After playing youth football with Blackburn Rovers, Burns signed on loan for F.C. United of Manchester in October 2021, scoring two goals in six games in all competitions, before moving (again on loan) to Scunthorpe United in January 2022. On 19 May 2023, it was announced Burns will leave Blackburn Rovers when his contract ends. In August 2023, he joined Super League Greece 2 side Panachaiki. On 8 September 2023, Burns joined Bootle. By November 2023 he was playing for Bury. In March 2024, he joined Warrington Rylands.

Burns joined Lower Breck in October 2024.
