= Sam Barnes (footballer, born 2001) =

English association football player (born 2001)

Personal information
- Full name: Samuel Peter Barnes
- Date of birth: 10 March 2001 (age 25)
- Place of birth: Blackburn, England
- Position: Centre-back

Team information
- Current team: Altrincham
- Number: 24

Youth career
- Lammack FC
- 2013–2023: Blackburn Rovers

Senior career*
Years	Team	Apps	(Gls)
2019–2024	Blackburn Rovers	0	(0)
2019	→ Marine (loan)	13	(1)
2024–2025	Barrow	4	(0)
2025–	Altrincham	28	(0)
- * Club domestic league appearances and goals as of 04:57, 22 March 2026 (UTC)

Samuel Peter Barnes (born 10 March 2001) is an English professional footballer who plays as a centre-back for Altrincham.

== Career ==
=== Blackburn ===
Born in Blackburn, Barnes joined the Blackburn Rovers youth academy as at the age of 11, and went on to captain their U18s. He joined Marine A.F.C. in the Northern Premier League on loan in January 2019. In February 2019 while on loan, he signed his first professional contract with Blackburn Rovers until 2021. In total, he made 13 appearances with Marine scoring 1 goal.

On 30 June 2021, Barnes extended his contract with Blackburn Rovers until 2023. He was part of the preseason side for the senior team in the summer of 2022, but suffered an ACL injury that had him sidelined for the rest season. On 27 September 2022, he again extended his contract with Blackburn Rovers for 2+1 seasons despite his injury. He made his senior and professional debut with Blackburn Rovers as a starter in a 4–3 EFL Cup win over Walsall on 8 August 2023, but shortly after suffered a setback on his injury.

On 18 May 2024, it was confirmed Barnes will be leaving the club at the end of his contract.

=== Barrow ===
On 18 June 2024, it was confirmed Barnes will join Barrow on the 1 July when his contract at Blackburn Rovers expires.

On 7 May 2025, Barrow announced the player would be leaving in June when his contract expired.

== Career statistics ==
As of match played 11 September 2023.

Appearances and goals by club, season and competition
Club	Season	League			FA Cup		League Cup		Other		Total	
Club	Season	Division	Apps	Goals	Apps	Goals	Apps	Goals	Apps	Goals	Apps	Goals
Blackburn Rovers
Blackburn Rovers	2023-24	Championship	0	0	0	0	1	0	0	0	1	0
Blackburn Rovers	Total		0	0	0	0	1	0	0	0	1	0
Career total			0	0	0	0	1	0	0	0	1	0
