= 2020–21 Blackburn Rovers F.C. season =

Blackburn Rovers F.C.
2020–21 season
- CEO: Steve Waggott
- Manager: Tony Mowbray
- Stadium: Ewood Park
- Championship: 15th
- FA Cup: Third round
- EFL Cup: Second round
- Top goalscorer: League: Adam Armstrong (28); All: Adam Armstrong (29)
Home colours	Away colours

The 2020–21 season was Blackburn Rovers' 133nd season as a professional football club and it participated in the Championship for a third consecutive season. Along with competing in the Championship, the club also participated in the FA Cup and EFL Cup. The season covered the period from 1 July 2020 to 30 June 2021.

== Summer activity ==
=== June ===
On the 24 Rovers announced their retained list Danny Graham, Stewart Downing, Dominic Samuel, Jayson Leutwiler, Richie Smallwood & Sam Hart discussions will be held regarding their future at the club.

From the development squad Rovers took the option to extend Matthew Platt contract by 12 months until 2021, whilst Brad Lyons & Ben Paton have both been offered new contracts, Jordan Eastham has signed a contract till 2022 while Sam Burns, Dan Pike, Jalil Saadi, Sam Durrant & James Connelly have signed contracts until 2021. Luke Brennan & Flavien Enzo Boyomo have been offered professional contracts but have yet to sign. Chanka Zimba, Jack Evans & Charley Doyle will not be retained by the club.

=== July ===
On the 1 Rovers announced the signing of young attacking midfielder Tyrhys Dolan from Preston North End on a 2-year deal following his release. Rovers also announced young winger Luke Brennan has signed his 1st professional deal, a 2-year contract until 2022, Also midfield duo Brad Lyons & Ben Paton signed 1 year deals until 2021.

On the 7 Forest Green Rovers announced the signing of Jack Evans following his release from Rovers.

On the 24 Rovers announced Danny Graham, Dominic Samuel, Jayson Leutwiler, Richie Smallwood & Sam Hart will not be offered new contracts by the club, Discussions continue to be held with Stewart Downing about extending his stay with Rovers.

On the 28 Rovers announced u23 midfielder Tom White had joined Bolton Wanderers on loan until the end of the season.

On the 29 Rovers announced u23 defender Matthew Platt had joined Barrow on a permanent deal for an undisclosed fee.

=== August ===
On the 11 Hull City announced the signing of Richie Smallwood following his release from Rovers.

On the 12 Atlético Albacete announced the signing of Flavien Enzo Boyomo after he rejected a new contract from Rovers.

On the 16 Rovers confirmed their agreement with official principal sponsor 10bet had ended 2 years into a 3-year deal.

On the 17 Rovers announced an extension to their partnership with Totally Wicked.

On the 26 Rovers announced the signing of Belgium goalkeeper Thomas Kaminski from Gent for an undisclosed fee, on a 2-year deal with the option of a further 12 months.

On the 28 Rovers announced Watson Ramsbottom Solicitors will remain our back-of-shirt sponsor for a third successive season.

On the 29 Rovers announced a new multi year shirt sponsor with leading performance and recovery compression wear brand Recoverite Compression, The new deal will see the Recoverite Compression brand on the front of all first team, Under-23s, youth and replica kits.

=== September ===
On the 2 Rovers announced the signing of young striker Connor McBride from Celtic on a free transfer, he signed a 2-year deal with the option of a further 12 months. Also Stalybridge Celtic announced the signing of Charley Doyle following his release from Rovers.

On the 4 Cardiff City announced the signing of Chanka Zimba following his release from Rovers.

On the 7 Sunderland announced the signing of Danny Graham following his release from Rovers.

On the 11 Fleetwood Town announced the signing of Jayson Leutwiler following his release from Rovers.

On the 15 Rovers announced the signing of defender Daniel Ayala following his release from Middlesbrough on a 3-year deal until 2023.

On the 21 Gillingham announced the signing of Dominic Samuel following his release from Rovers.

On the 28 Rovers announced the signing of young goalkeeper Felix Goddard following his release from Manchester City on a 2-year scholarship.

=== October ===
On the 6 Rovers announced u23 midfielder Stefan Mols had joined Intercity on loan until the end of the season. Also Rovers announced the signing of Greek u21 goalkeeper Antonis Stergiakis from Slavia Sofia on a 3-year deal until 2023 with the option of a further 12 months.

On the 16 Rovers announced the signing of defender Barry Douglas on loan from Leeds United until the end of the season, Rovers also announced the signing of midfielder Tom Trybull on loan from Norwich City until the end of the season, Rovers also announced defender Charlie Mulgrew had joined Fleetwood Town on loan until the end of the season, Rovers also announced the signing of goalkeeper Aynsley Pears from Middlesbrough for an undisclosed fee on a 4-year deal until 2024, Rovers also announced goalkeeper Andy Fisher had joined Milton Keynes Dons on a permanent deal, Rovers also announced the signing of Harvey Elliott on loan from Liverpool until the end of the season.

=== November ===
On the 2 Rovers announced midfielder Stewart Downing had rejoined the club.

On the 9 Rovers announced defender Tyler Magloire had joined Hartlepool United on loan until 9 January.

On the 11 Southend United announced the signing of Sam Hart following his release from Rovers.

On the 13 Rovers announced winger Luke Brennan had joined AFC Fylde on loan until the end of the season.

== Winter activity ==
=== December ===
On the 23 Rovers announced attacking midfielder Bradley Dack had signed new 2 and half year deal until 2023, with the option of a further 12 months.

On the 31 Rovers announced winger Harry Chapman had joined Shrewsbury Town on loan until the end of the season.

=== January ===
On the 6 Rovers announced midfielder Brad Lyons had joined Morecambe on loan until the end of the season, Also defender Hayden Carter joined Burton Albion on loan until the end of the season.

On the 12 Rovers announced goalkeeper Joe Hilton had joined Fleetwood Town on an emergency 7 day loan.

On the 13 Rovers announced midfielder Luke Brennan had been recalled from his loan at AFC Fylde.

On the 14 Rovers announced the signing of defender Jarrad Branthwaite on loan from Everton until the end of the season.

On the 15 Rovers announced young midfielder Joe Nolan had signed a professional contract until 2022 following a successful trial.

On the 22 Rovers announced midfielder Stefan Mols had returned from his loan spell at Intercity.

On the 27 Rovers announced goalkeeper Joe Hilton had signed a new contract until 2022 & joined Ross County until the end of the season.

=== February ===
On the 1 Rovers announced the signing of defender Harry Pickering from Crewe Alexandra for an undisclosed fee, on a 4 and half year deal until 2025, he will remain on loan until the end of the season, Rovers also announced defender Joe Grayson had joined Oxford United on loan until the end of the season, Rovers also announced defender Taylor Harwood-Bellis had joined on loan from Manchester City until the end of the season, Rovers also announced forward Jack Vale had joined Rochdale on loan until the end of the season.

On the 2 Rovers announced midfielder Tom White had returned from his loan spell at Bolton Wanderers, Rovers also announced defender Tyler Magloire had joined Motherwell on loan until the end of the season.

On the 5 Rovers announced midfielder Tom White had joined Hartlepool United on a short-term loan deal.

On the 15 Rovers announced midfielder John Buckley signed a new long-term deal until 2024, with the option of a further 12 months.

On the 16 Rovers announced midfielder Tyrhys Dolan signed a new long-term deal until 2024, with the option of a further 12 months.

=== March ===
On the 4 Rovers announced defender Derrick Williams had left the club by mutual consent to join LA Galaxy.

=== May ===
On the 7 Rovers announced their end of season award winners Thomas Kaminski was voted Player of the Season, Harvey Elliott's goal against Millwall was voted Goal of the Season, Adam Armstrong was voted Player's Player of the Year & Junior Rovers Player of the Year & Tyrhys Dolan was named this season's PFA Club Community Champion.

== Squad information ==
Squad no.	Name	Nationality	Position(s)	Date of birth (age)	Contract expires	Other
Goalkeepers
45	Jordan Eastham	(England)	GK	8 September 2001 (age 24)	2022	
1	Thomas Kaminski	(Belgium)	GK	23 October 1992 (age 33)	2022	Option for 12-month extension.
13	Aynsley Pears	(England)	GK	23 April 1998 (age 28)	2024	
41	Antonis Stergiakis	(Greece)	GK	16 March 1999 (age 27)	2023	Option for 12-month extension.
Defenders
5	Daniel Ayala	(Spain)	DF	7 November 1990 (age 35)	2023	
17	Amari'i Bell	(Jamaica)	DF	5 May 1994 (age 32)	2021	
30	Jarrad Branthwaite	(England)	DF	27 June 2002 (age 24)	2021	on loan from Everton
25	Hayden Carter	(England)	DF	17 December 1999 (age 26)	2022	on loan at Morecambe
15	Barry Douglas	(Scotland)	DF	4 September 1989 (age 37)	2021	on loan from Leeds United
36	Joe Grayson	(England)	DF	26 March 1999 (age 27)	2021	on loan at Oxford United
22	Taylor Harwood-Bellis	(England)	DF	30 January 2002 (age 24)	2021	on loan from Manchester City
26	Darragh Lenihan	(Republic of Ireland)	DF	16 March 1994 (age 32)	2022	
38	Tyler Magloire	(England)	DF	21 December 1998 (age 27)	2022	on loan at Motherwell
14	Charlie Mulgrew	(Scotland)	DF	6 March 1986 (age 40)	2021	on loan at Fleetwood Town
2	Ryan Nyambe	(Namibia)	DF	4 December 1997 (age 28)	2021	Option for 12-month extension.
	Harry Pickering	(England)	DF	29 December 1998 (age 27)	2025	on loan at Crewe Alexandra
40	Daniel Pike	(England)	DF	9 January 2002 (age 24)	2023	Option for 12-month extension.
28	Scott Wharton	(England)	DF	3 October 1997 (age 28)	2024	Option for 12-month extension.
Midfielders
31	Elliott Bennett	(England)	MF	18 December 1988 (age 37)	2021	
21	John Buckley	(England)	MF	13 October 1999 (age 26)	2024	Option for 12-month extension.
37	Luke Brennan	(England)	MF	19 October 2001 (age 24)	2022	
11	Harry Chapman	(England)	MF	5 November 1997 (age 28)	2021	Option for 12-month extension, on loan at Shrewsbury Town
23	Bradley Dack	(England)	MF	31 December 1993 (age 32)	2023	Option for 12-month extension.
18	Jacob Davenport	(England)	MF	28 December 1998 (age 27)	2022	
39	Tyrhys Dolan	(England)	MF	28 December 2001 (age 24)	2024	Option for 12-month extension.
6	Stewart Downing	(England)	MF	22 July 1984 (age 42)	2021	
16	Harvey Elliott	(England)	MF	4 April 2003 (age 23)	2021	on loan from Liverpool
29	Corry Evans	(Northern Ireland)	MF	30 July 1990 (age 36)	2021	
10	Lewis Holtby	(Germany)	MF	18 September 1990 (age 35)	2021	
4	Bradley Johnson	(England)	MF	28 April 1987 (age 39)	2021	
34	Brad Lyons	(Northern Ireland)	MF	26 May 1997 (age 29)	2021	on loan at Burton Albion
43	Connor McBride	(Scotland)	MF	20 January 2001 (age 25)	2022	Option for 12-month extension.
24	Joe Rankin-Costello	(England)	MF	26 July 1999 (age 27)	2021	Option for 12-month extension.
8	Joe Rothwell	(England)	MF	11 January 1995 (age 31)	2021	Option for 12-month extension.
27	Lewis Travis	(England)	MF	16 October 1997 (age 28)	2023	Option for 12 months extension
19	Tom Trybull	(Germany)	MF	9 March 1993 (age 33)	2021	on loan from Norwich City
Forwards
7	Adam Armstrong	(England)	FW	10 February 1997 (age 29)	2022	
20	Ben Brereton Díaz	(Chile)	FW	18 April 1999 (age 27)	2022	
32	Daniel Butterworth	(England)	FW	14 September 1999 (age 26)	2022	
9	Sam Gallagher	(England)	FW	15 September 1995 (age 30)	2023	

== Pre-season ==
On 14 August Rovers confirmed their pre-season scheduled.

22 August 2020 Friendly	Fleetwood Town	1–4	Blackburn Rovers	Fleetwood
13:00 BST	Evans 14'	Report	Chapman 26'; Armstrong 46' 67'; Brennan 78'	Stadium: Highbury Stadium; Attendance: Behind closed doors

25 August 2020 Friendly	Blackpool	1–3	Blackburn Rovers	Blackpool
19:00 BST	Virtue 40'	Report	Brereton 4' 30'; Dolan 88'	Stadium: Bloomfield Road; Attendance: Behind closed doors

29 August 2020 Friendly	Bolton Wanderers	v	Blackburn Rovers	Bolton
TBC				Stadium: University of Bolton Stadium; Attendance: Behind closed doors
Note: On 21 August, the scheduled away fixture against Bolton Wanderers was postponed due to Rovers game against Doncaster Rovers in the EFL Cup been scheduled on the same date.

1 September 2020 Friendly	Blackburn Rovers	Cancelled	Everton	Blackburn
18:00 BST				Stadium: Ewood Park; Attendance: Behind closed doors
Note: On 30 August following discussions between the two clubs it was mutually agreed that the game will be called off.

5 September 2020 Friendly	Leicester City	1–1	Blackburn Rovers	Leicester
13:00 BST	Amartey 66'	Report	Williams 80'	Stadium: King Power Stadium; Attendance: Behind closed doors

== Competitions ==
=== Championship ===
==== League table ====
Pos	Team	Pld	W	D	L	GF	GA	GD	Pts
12	Luton Town	46	17	11	18	41	52	−11	62
13	Preston North End	46	18	7	21	49	56	−7	61
14	Stoke City	46	15	15	16	50	52	−2	60
15	Blackburn Rovers	46	15	12	19	65	54	+11	57
16	Coventry City	46	14	13	19	49	61	−12	55
17	Nottingham Forest	46	12	16	18	37	45	−8	52
18	Birmingham City	46	13	13	20	37	61	−24	52

Source: EFL Official Website
Rules for classification: 1) Points; 2) Goal difference; 3) Number of goals scored; 4) Head-to-head results; 5) Wins; 6) Away goals; 7) Penalty points (sec 9.5); 8) 12-point sending off offences

==== Results summary ====
Overall								Home						Away					
Pld	W	D	L	GF	GA	GD	Pts	W	D	L	GF	GA	GD	W	D	L	GF	GA	GD
46	15	12	19	65	54	+11	57	9	7	7	37	28	+9	6	5	12	28	26	+2

Last updated: 8 May 2021.
Source: BBC

==== Results by matchday ====
Matchday	1	2	3	4	5	6	7	8	9	10	11	12	13	14	15	16	17	18	19	20	21	22	23	24	25	26	27	28	29	30	31	32	33	34	35	36	37	38	39	40	41	42	43	44	45	46
Ground	A	H	A	H	H	A	A	H	A	H	H	A	A	H	H	A	A	H	H	A	H	A	A	H	A	H	A	H	A	A	H	H	A	A	H	H	H	A	A	H	A	H	A	H	A	H
Result	L	W	W	D	L	L	W	L	L	D	W	D	W	W	W	D	L	L	W	L	D	L	W	D	W	W	L	L	L	L	L	D	L	W	D	L	D	D	L	L	D	W	L	W	D	W
Position	13	9	6	6	9	14	10	12	14	17	12	14	12	9	9	9	10	12	11	11	11	14	11	11	10	8	8	8	12	12	15	15	15	15	14	14	15	15	15	17	17	15	15	15	15	15

Updated to match(es) played on 8 May 2021. Source: 11v11 for league tables and fixtures
A = Away; H = Home; W = Win; D = Draw; L = Loss

==== Matchday ====
The 2020–21 season fixtures were released on 21 August.

12 September 2020 1	Bournemouth	3–2	Blackburn Rovers	Kings Park
15:00 BST	Stacey 25'; Lerma 53'; Danjuma 84'	Report	Johnson 42'; Armstrong 73'	Stadium: Vitality Stadium; Attendance: 0 Referee: Gavin Ward

19 September 2020 2	Blackburn Rovers	5–0	Wycombe Wanderers	Blackburn
15:00 BST	Armstrong 16' (pen.), 33', 83'; Dolan 20'; Williams 67'	Report		Stadium: Ewood Park; Referee: Peter Bankes

26 September 2020 3	Derby County	0–4	Blackburn Rovers	Derby
15:00 BST	Buchanan (yellow card) 33'; Rooney (yellow card) 80'	Report	Dolan 11'; Johnson 12', 15' (yellow card) 36'; Lenihan (yellow card) 42'; Rothwell (yellow card) 66'; Armstrong 77'	Stadium: Pride Park Stadium; Attendance: 0 Referee: Andy Woolmer

3 October 2020 4	Blackburn Rovers	0–0	Cardiff City	Blackburn
15:00 BST	Johnson (yellow card) 50'; Gallagher (yellow card) 80'	Report	Cunningham (yellow card) 34'; Bacuna (yellow card) 49'; Tomlin (yellow card) 59' (yellow-red card) 69'	Stadium: Ewood Park; Attendance: 0 Referee: Darren Bond

17 October 2020 5	Blackburn Rovers	0–1	Nottingham Forest	Blackburn
15:00 BST	Johnson (yellow card) 58'; Gallagher (yellow card) 72'	Report	Figueiredo (yellow card) 28'; Lolley 90'	Stadium: Ewood Park; Attendance: 0 Referee: Jarred Gillett

21 October 2020 6	Watford	3–1	Blackburn Rovers	Watford
19:45 BST	Pedro 13' (yellow card) 84'; Cleverley 17'; Kabasele (yellow card) 22'; Lenihan 49' (o.g.); Ngakia (yellow card) 75'	Report	Brereton 28'; Armstrong (penalty missed) 69'	Stadium: Vicarage Road; Attendance: 0 Referee: Andy Woolmer

24 October 2020 7	Coventry City	0–4	Blackburn Rovers	Birmingham
15:00 BST	Rose (red card) 14'; Sheaf (yellow card) 74'	Report	Armstrong 15' (pen.), 49' (yellow card) 51'; Douglas (yellow card) 20'; Elliott 62'; Gallagher 88'	Stadium: St Andrew's; Attendance: 0 Referee: Darren England

27 October 2020 8	Blackburn Rovers	2–4	Reading	Blackburn
19:45 GMT	Armstrong 3', 66'; Holtby (yellow card) 5'; Trybull (yellow card) 20'	Report	Méïté 1'; Olise 15'; Laurent 18'; Rafael (yellow card) 76'; João (yellow card) 79' (goal) 82'	Stadium: Ewood Park; Attendance: 0 Referee: David Coote

31 October 2020 9	Swansea City	2–0	Blackburn Rovers	Swansea
15:00 GMT	Ayew (yellow card) 19' (goal) 61'; Cabango 25' (yellow card) 55'; Bidwell (yellow card) 30'	Report		Stadium: Liberty Stadium; Attendance: 0 Referee: Dean Whitestone

3 November 2020 10	Blackburn Rovers	0–0	Middlesbrough	Blackburn
19:45 GMT	Trybull (yellow card) 18'; Rankin-Costello (yellow card) 50'; Lenihan (yellow card) 78'; Wharton (yellow card) 85'; Holtby (yellow card) 90+2'	Report	McNair (yellow card) 67'	Stadium: Ewood Park; Attendance: 0 Referee: David Webb

7 November 2020 11	Blackburn Rovers	3–1	Queens Park Rangers	Blackburn
15:00 GMT	Brereton 50'; Johnson (yellow card) 65'; Armstrong 73', 90+6'	Report	Kane (yellow card) 9'; Dickie (yellow card) 23'; Dykes 61' (pen.); Bonne (yellow card) 90+3'	Stadium: Ewood Park; Attendance: 0 Referee: Tim Robinson

21 November 2020 12	Luton Town	1–1	Blackburn Rovers	Luton
15:00 GMT	Berry 69'	Report	Rothwell (yellow card) 32'; Johnson (yellow card) 71'; Gallagher 72'; Elliott (yellow card) 81'; Brereton (yellow card) 90+3'	Stadium: Kenilworth Road; Attendance: 0 Referee: Gavin Ward

24 November 2020 13	Preston North End	0–3	Blackburn Rovers	Preston
19:45 GMT	Browne (yellow card) 22'; Rafferty (red card) 44'	Report	Trybull (yellow card) 36'; Armstrong 45' (pen.); Brereton 53'; Dolan 76'	Stadium: Deepdale; Attendance: 0 Referee: Tony Harrington

28 November 2020 14	Blackburn Rovers	2–1	Barnsley	Blackburn
15:00 GMT	Armstrong 44' (yellow card) 69'; Gallagher 78'; Rothwell (yellow card) 90+6'	Report	Palmer 90'	Stadium: Ewood Park; Attendance: 0 Referee: Andrew Madley

2 December 2020 15	Blackburn Rovers	2–1	Millwall	Blackburn
19:45 GMT	Elliott 25'; Armstrong 90+1'	Report	Williams (yellow card) 19'; Malone 34'; Wallace (yellow card) 64'	Stadium: Ewood Park; Attendance: 0 Referee: Michael Salisbury

5 December 2020 16	Brentford	2–2	Blackburn Rovers	Brentford
15:00 GMT	Forss (yellow card) 5'; Janelt (yellow card) 31'; Toney 37' (pen.); Canós 61'; Fosu (yellow card) 82'	Report	Douglas (yellow card) 10'; Rothwell 19' (yellow card) 49'; Lenihan (yellow card) 27' (red card) 36'; Johnson (yellow card) 57'; Davenport 87'; Kaminski (yellow card) 90+4'	Stadium: Brentford Community Stadium; Attendance: 2,000; Referee: Oliver Langford

9 December 2020 17	Bristol City	1–0	Blackburn Rovers	Ashton Gate
19:45 GMT	Wells (yellow card) 38'; Diédhiou 82'	Report		Stadium: Ashton Gate Stadium; Referee: Steve Martin

12 December 2020 18	Blackburn Rovers	1–2	Norwich City	Blackburn
15:00 GMT	Elliott 59'	Report	Pukki 22', 65' (yellow card) 84'	Stadium: Ewood Park; Attendance: 0 Referee: Dean Whitestone

16 December 2020 19	Blackburn Rovers	2–1	Rotherham United	Blackburn
19:45 GMT	Douglas (yellow card) 58'; Elliott 80'; Nyambe (yellow card) 90+1'; Armstrong 90+8'	Report	Ihiekwe (yellow card) 38'; Smith 61'; Lindsay (yellow card) 64'; Jones (yellow card) 90+5'	Stadium: Ewood Park; Attendance: 0 Referee: Jarred Gillett

19 December 2020 20	Stoke City	1–0	Blackburn Rovers	Stoke-on-Trent
15:00 GMT	Powell 6'; Chester (yellow card) 36'	Report		Stadium: Bet365 Stadium; Attendance: 0 Referee: David Webb

26 December 2020 21	Blackburn Rovers	1–1	Sheffield Wednesday	Blackburn
15:00 GMT	Rothwell 76'; Lenihan (yellow card) 79'	Report	Reach 41'	Stadium: Ewood Park; Attendance: 0 Referee: Tony Harrington

29 December 2020 22	Huddersfield Town	2–1	Blackburn Rovers	Huddersfield
19:45 GMT	Pipa (yellow card) 41'; Sarr 53', 90'; Campbell (yellow card) 55'; Hogg (yellow card) 67'	Report	Lenihan (yellow card) 50'; Gallagher 86'; Holtby (yellow card) 89'	Stadium: The John Smith's Stadium; Attendance: 0 Referee: Matt Donohue

2 January 2021 23	Birmingham City	0–2	Blackburn Rovers	Bordesley
15:00 GMT	Sánchez (yellow card) 85'	Report	Armstrong 10' (yellow card) 83'; Travis (yellow card) 39'; Douglas (yellow card) 81'; Dack 90+2'	Stadium: St. Andrew's Stadium; Attendance: 0 Referee: Gavin Ward

16 January 2021 24	Blackburn Rovers	1–1	Stoke City	Blackburn
15:00 GMT	Travis (yellow card) 36'; Buckley 76'	Report	Powell 38'; Thompson (yellow card) 48'; Norrington-Davies (yellow card) 71'; Chester (red card) 79'	Stadium: Ewood Park; Attendance: 0 Referee: Geoff Eltringham

24 January 2021 25	Middlesbrough	0–1	Blackburn Rovers	Middlesbrough
15:00 GMT	Morsy (yellow card) 57'; Tavernier (yellow card) 81'; Bola (yellow card) 88'	Report	Davenport (yellow card) 26'; Rothwell 63'	Stadium: Riverside Stadium; Attendance: 0 Referee: Dean Whitestone

30 January 2021 26	Blackburn Rovers	1–0	Luton Town	Blackburn
15:00 GMT	Travis (yellow card) 50'; Armstrong 85'	Report	Rea (yellow card) 63'	Stadium: Ewood Park; Attendance: 0 Referee: Jeremy Simpson

6 February 2021 27	Queens Park Rangers	1–0	Blackburn Rovers	Shepherd's Bush, London
15:00 GMT	Austin (yellow card) 5'; Ball (yellow card) 20'; Barbet 54'; Adomah (yellow card) 90+2'	Report	Davenport (yellow card) 9'; Gallagher (yellow card) 60'	Stadium: Kiyan Prince Foundation Stadium; Attendance: 0 Referee: Tony Harrington

12 February 2021 28	Blackburn Rovers	1–2	Preston North End	Blackburn
19:45 GMT	Armstrong 45+1' (pen.)		Cunningham 19'; Lindsay 43'; Ledson (yellow card) 61'	Stadium: Ewood Park; Attendance: 0 Referee: David Webb

17 February 2021 29	Barnsley	2–1	Blackburn Rovers	Barnsley
19:45 GMT	Andersen (yellow card) 53'; Morris 72'; Mowatt 90'	Report	Harwood-Bellis (yellow card) 83'; Armstrong 90+4'	Stadium: Oakwell Stadium; Attendance: 0 Referee: Matt Donohue

20 February 2021 30	Nottingham Forest	1–0	Blackburn Rovers	West Bridgford
15:00 GMT	Mighten 25'; Murray (yellow card) 41'; Garner (yellow card) 68'	Report	Harwood-Bellis (yellow card) 2'; Armstrong (penalty missed) 73'	Stadium: The City Ground; Attendance: 0 Referee: Keith Stroud

24 February 2021 31	Blackburn Rovers	2–3	Watford	Blackburn
19:45 GMT	Rothwell (yellow card) 34'; Elliott 43'; Brereton 82'	Report	Pedro 25'; Sarr 38'; Sema 61'	Stadium: Ewood Park; Attendance: 0 Referee: James Linington

27 February 2021 32	Blackburn Rovers	1–1	Coventry City	Blackburn
15:00 GMT	Brereton 27'; Douglas (yellow card) 61'	Report	James 50'; Østigård (yellow card) 69' (yellow-red card) 83'	Stadium: Ewood Park; Attendance: 0 Referee: Darren Bond

2 March 2021 33	Reading	1–0	Blackburn Rovers	Reading
20:00 GMT	Semedo (yellow card) 17'; Puscas 24'	Report	Bell (yellow card) 52'; Evans (yellow card) 58'; Kaminski (yellow card) 90+5'	Stadium: Madejski Stadium; Attendance: 0 Referee: Gavin Ward

6 March 2021 34	Millwall	0–2	Blackburn Rovers	Bermondsey
15:00 GMT	Woods (yellow card) 43'; Evans (yellow card) 77'	Report	Dack 18'; Gallagher (yellow card) 65', (goal) 75'; Trybull (yellow card) 77'; Kaminski (yellow card) 85'	Stadium: The Den; Attendance: 0 Referee: Matt Donohue

9 March 2021 35	Blackburn Rovers	1–1	Swansea City	Blackburn
18:00 GMT	Dack 37'; Rankin-Costello (yellow card) 53'	Report	Ayew 41' (pen.); Cabango (yellow card) 68'	Stadium: Ewood Park; Attendance: 0 Referee: Robert Jones

12 March 2021 36	Blackburn Rovers	0–1	Brentford	Blackburn
19:45 GMT	Buckley (yellow card) 75'; Lenihan (yellow card) 86'; Bennett (yellow card) 90+6'; Johnson (yellow card) 90+9'	Report	Toney 10' (pen.); Mbeumo (yellow card) 80'; Sørensen (yellow card) 90'	Stadium: Ewood Park; Attendance: 0 Referee: Geoff Eltringham

17 March 2021 37	Blackburn Rovers	0–0	Bristol City	Blackburn
19:45 GMT		Report	Palmer (yellow card) 74'	Stadium: Ewood Park; Attendance: 0 Referee: Craig Hicks

20 March 2021 38	Norwich City	1–1	Blackburn Rovers	Norwich
15:00 GMT	McLean 53'	Report	Gallagher 77'	Stadium: Carrow Road; Attendance: 0 Referee: Keith Stroud

2 April 2021 39	Wycombe Wanderers	1–0	Blackburn Rovers	High Wycombe
15:00 BST	Onyedinma 47'; Thompson (yellow card) 85'	Report	Holtby (yellow card) 25'	Stadium: Adams Park; Attendance: 0 Referee: David Webb

5 April 2021 40	Blackburn Rovers	0–2	Bournemouth	Blackburn
15:00 BST	Elliott (yellow card) 78'; Armstrong (penalty missed) 90+2'	Report	Billing 29'; Lerma (yellow card) 50'; Solanke (yellow card) 51'; Danjuma 75'	Stadium: Ewood Park; Attendance: 0 Referee: Darren Bond

10 April 2021 41	Cardiff City	2–2	Blackburn Rovers	Cardiff
15:00 BST	Vaulks 27'; Murphy (yellow card) 44'; Ralls 70', (yellow card) 75'	Report	Kaminski (yellow card) 19'; Armstrong 43', 90'; Lenihan (yellow card) 65'	Stadium: Cardiff City Stadium; Attendance: 0 Referee: Jeremy Simpson

16 April 2021 42	Blackburn Rovers	2–1	Derby County	Blackburn
18:00 BST	Holtby (yellow card) 32'; Gallagher 42'; Elliott 66', (yellow card) 67'	Report	Lawrence 22'; Clarke (yellow card) 45+2'	Stadium: Ewood Park; Attendance: 0 Referee: Steve Martin

20 April 2021 43	Sheffield Wednesday	1–0	Blackburn Rovers	Owlerton
19:00 BST	Hutchinson (yellow card) 15'; Windass 37'; Bannan (yellow card) 80'	Report	Evans (yellow card) 40'; Rothwell (yellow card) 74'	Stadium: Hillsborough; Attendance: 0 Referee: Paul Tierney

24 April 2021 44	Blackburn Rovers	5–2	Huddersfield Town	Blackburn
15:00 BST	Travis (yellow card) 5'; Armstrong 8', 54', 60'; Brereton 22'; Lenihan (yellow card) 26'; Gallagher 57'; Davenport (yellow card) 89'	Report	Nyambe 45' (o.g.); Holmes (yellow card) 82'; Koroma 82'	Stadium: Ewood Park; Attendance: 0 Referee: Tim Robinson

1 May 2021 45	Rotherham United	1–1	Blackburn Rovers	Rotherham
15:00 BST	Smith (yellow card) 21'; Lindsay (yellow card) 69'; Barlaser (yellow card) 78'; Wing 86'	Report	Armstrong 17'	Stadium: New York Stadium; Attendance: 0 Referee: Tony Harrington

8 May 2021 46	Blackburn Rovers	5–2	Birmingham City	Blackburn
12:30 BST	Armstrong 27' (pen.), 71', 85'; Brereton 45+1'; Elliott 83'	Report	Pedersen 22', (yellow card) 67'; Leko (yellow card) 26'; Stirk (yellow card) 40'; Jutkiewicz 50'	Stadium: Ewood Park; Attendance: 0 Referee: Keith Stroud

=== FA Cup ===
The third round draw was made on 30 November, with Premier League and EFL Championship clubs all entering the competition.

9 January 2021 Third round	Blackburn Rovers	0–1	Doncaster Rovers	Blackburn
15:00 GMT	Downing (yellow card) 35'; Travis (yellow card) 40'; Davenport (yellow card) 90+2'	Report	Richards 42'; John (yellow card) 81'	Stadium: Ewood Park; Attendance: 0 Referee: Sam Barrott

=== EFL Cup ===
The first round draw was made on 18 August, live on Sky Sports, by Paul Merson. The draw for both the second and third round were confirmed on 6 September, live on Sky Sports by Phil Babb.

29 August 2020 First round	Blackburn Rovers	3–2	Doncaster Rovers	Blackburn
15:00 BST	Holtby 30'; Lenihan (yellow card) 53'; Rankin-Costello 72'; Armstrong 81' (pen.)	Report	Wright (yellow card) 44'; Okenabirhie 54' (pen.); Anderson (yellow card) 55'; Gomes 64'; Halliday (yellow card) 70'	Stadium: Ewood Park; Referee: Anthony Backhouse

15 September 2020 Second round	Newcastle United	1–0	Blackburn Rovers	Newcastle upon Tyne
19:30 BST	Fraser 35'	Report		Stadium: St James' Park; Attendance: 0 Referee: Jarred Gillett

== Backroom staff ==
Position	Staff
Manager	(England) Tony Mowbray
Assistant manager	(England) Mark Venus
First-team coach	(England) David Lowe
First-team coach	(Northern Ireland) Damien Johnson
Goalkeeping coach	(England) Ben Benson
Head of Academy	(England) Stuart Jones
Head of Academy coaching	(England) Tony Carss
Under-23 lead coach	(England) Billy Barr
Under-18 lead coach	(England) Mike Sheron

Last updated: May 2017

== Squad statistics ==
=== Appearances and goals ===
As of 8 May 2021

No.	Pos	Nat	Player	Total		Championship		FA Cup		EFL Cup	
No.	Pos	Nat	Player	Apps	Goals	Apps	Goals	Apps	Goals	Apps	Goals
1	GK	(Belgium) BEL	Thomas Kaminski	44	0	43+0	0	0+0	0	1+0	0
13	GK	(England) ENG	Aynsley Pears	4	0	3+0	0	1+0	0	0+0	0
41	GK	(Greece) GRE	Antonis Stergiakis	0	0	0+0	0	0+0	0	0+0	0
45	GK	(England) ENG	Jordan Eastham	0	0	0+0	0	0+0	0	0+0	0
2	DF	(Namibia) NAM	Ryan Nyambe	39	0	33+5	0	0+0	0	1+0	0
5	DF	(Spain) ESP	Daniel Ayala	10	0	8+2	0	0+0	0	0+0	0
15	DF	(Scotland) SCO	Barry Douglas (on loan from Leeds United)	31	0	29+1	0	0+1	0	0+0	0
17	DF	(Jamaica) JAM	Amari'i Bell	22	0	15+4	0	1+0	0	2+0	0
22	DF	(England) ENG	Taylor Harwood-Bellis (on loan from Manchester City)	19	0	17+2	0	0+0	0	0+0	0
26	DF	(Republic of Ireland) IRL	Darragh Lenihan (VC)	44	0	41+0	0	1+0	0	2+0	0
28	DF	(England) ENG	Scott Wharton	8	0	5+2	0	0+0	0	1+0	0
30	DF	(England) ENG	Jarrad Branthwaite (on loan from Everton)	10	0	10+0	0	0+0	0	0+0	0
40	DF	(England) ENG	Daniel Pike	0	0	0+0	0	0+0	0	0+0	0
4	MF	(England) ENG	Bradley Johnson	32	3	25+5	3	1+0	0	1+0	0
6	MF	(England) ENG	Stewart Downing	19	0	2+16	0	1+0	0	0+0	0
8	MF	(England) ENG	Joe Rothwell	42	3	29+10	3	0+1	0	1+1	0
10	MF	(Germany) GER	Lewis Holtby	29	1	20+7	0	0+0	0	2+0	1
16	MF	(England) ENG	Harvey Elliott (on loan from Liverpool)	42	7	31+10	7	0+1	0	0+0	0
18	MF	(England) ENG	Jacob Davenport	16	1	6+9	1	0+1	0	0+0	0
19	MF	(Germany) GER	Tom Trybull (on loan from Norwich City)	26	0	18+7	0	1+0	0	0+0	0
21	MF	(England) ENG	John Buckley	30	1	7+21	1	1+0	0	0+1	0
23	MF	(England) ENG	Bradley Dack	17	3	7+9	3	1+0	0	0+0	0
24	MF	(England) ENG	Joe Rankin-Costello	16	1	14+0	0	0+0	0	2+0	1
27	MF	(England) ENG	Lewis Travis	22	0	16+3	0	1+0	0	2+0	0
29	MF	(Northern Ireland) NIR	Corry Evans	18	0	11+7	0	0+0	0	0+0	0
31	MF	(England) ENG	Elliott Bennett (C)	9	0	2+7	0	0+0	0	0+0	0
37	MF	(England) ENG	Luke Brennan	1	0	0+1	0	0+0	0	0+0	0
39	MF	(England) ENG	Tyrhys Dolan	40	3	10+27	3	1+0	0	1+1	0
43	MF	(Scotland) SCO	Connor McBride	0	0	0+0	0	0+0	0	0+0	0
7	FW	(England) ENG	Adam Armstrong	43	29	40+0	28	0+1	0	1+1	1
9	FW	(England) ENG	Sam Gallagher	39	8	24+15	8	0+0	0	0+0	0
20	FW	(Chile) CHI	Ben Brereton Díaz	43	7	30+10	7	1+0	0	2+0	0
32	FW	(England) ENG	Daniel Butterworth	1	0	0+1	0	0+0	0	0+0	0
Players out on loan:
11	MF	(England) ENG	Harry Chapman (on loan at Shrewsbury Town)	7	0	0+5	0	0+0	0	1+1	0
14	DF	(Scotland) SCO	Charlie Mulgrew (on loan at Fleetwood Town)	0	0	0+0	0	0+0	0	0+0	0
25	DF	(England) ENG	Hayden Carter (on loan at Burton Albion)	1	0	0+1	0	0+0	0	0+0	0
34	MF	(Northern Ireland) NIR	Brad Lyons (on loan at Morecambe)	0	0	0+0	0	0+0	0	0+0	0
36	DF	(England) ENG	Joe Grayson (on loan at Oxford United)	0	0	0+0	0	0+0	0	0+0	0
38	DF	(England) ENG	Tyler Magloire (on loan at Motherwell)	0	0	0+0	0	0+0	0	0+0	0
	GK	(England) ENG	Joe Hilton (on loan at Ross County)	0	0	0+0	0	0+0	0	0+0	0
	DF	(England) ENG	Harry Pickering (on loan at Crewe Alexandra)	0	0	0+0	0	0+0	0	0+0	0
	MF	(England) ENG	Tom White (on loan at Hartlepool United)	0	0	0+0	0	0+0	0	0+0	0
	FW	(Wales) WAL	Jack Vale (on loan at Rochdale)	0	0	0+0	0	0+0	0	0+0	0
Players that played for Blackburn Rovers this season that have left the club:
33	GK	(England) ENG	Andrew Fisher	1	0	0+0	0	0+0	0	1+0	0
3	DF	(Republic of Ireland) IRL	Derrick Williams	11	1	10+0	1	0+0	0	1+0	0

=== Goalscorers ===
As of 8 May 2021

Rank	No.	Pos.	Name	League	FA Cup	EFL Cup	Total
1	7	FW	(England) Adam Armstrong	28	0	1	29
2	9	FW	(England) Sam Gallagher	8	0	0	8
3	16	MF	(England) Harvey Elliott	7	0	0	7
=	20	FW	(Chile) Ben Brereton Díaz	7	0	0	7
5	4	MF	(England) Bradley Johnson	3	0	0	3
=	8	MF	(England) Joe Rothwell	3	0	0	3
=	39	MF	(England) Tyrhys Dolan	3	0	0	3
=	23	MF	(England) Bradley Dack	3	0	0	3
9	3	DF	(Republic of Ireland) Derrick Williams	1	0	0	1
=	10	MF	(Germany) Lewis Holtby	0	0	1	1
=	18	MF	(England) Jacob Davenport	1	0	0	1
=	21	MF	(England) John Buckley	1	0	0	1
=	24	MF	(England) Joe Rankin-Costello	0	0	1	1
—	—	—	Own goal	0	0	0	0
Total				65	0	3	68

== Transfers ==
=== Summer ===
==== Transfers in ====
Date	Position	Nationality	Name	From	Fee	Ref.	Other.
1 July 2020	CAM	(England)	Tyrhys Dolan	Unattached (Note: Released from Preston North End)	Free		Signed for Blackburn Rovers U23's
26 August 2020	GK	(Belgium)	Thomas Kaminski	(Belgium) Gent	Undisclosed		
2 September 2020	CF	(Scotland)	Connor McBride	(Scotland) Celtic	Free		Signed for Blackburn Rovers U23's
15 September 2020	CB	(Spain)	Daniel Ayala	Unattached (Note: Released from Middlesbrough)	Free		
28 September 2020	GK	(England)	Felix Goddard	Unattached (Note: Released from Manchester City)	Free		Signed for Blackburn Rovers U18's
6 October 2020	GK	(Greece)	Antonis Stergiakis	(Bulgaria) Slavia Sofia	Undisclosed		Signed for Blackburn Rovers U23's
16 October 2020	GK	(England)	Aynsley Pears	(England) Middlesbrough	Undisclosed		

Total outgoing: +/- ~£

==== Transfers out ====
Date from	Position	Nationality	Name	To	Fee	Ref.
30 June 2020	CF	(England)	Chanka Zimba	Released (Note: Joined Cardiff City on 4 September)	n\a	
30 June 2020	LB	(England)	Jack Evans	Released (Note: Joined Forest Green Rovers on 7 July)	n\a	
30 June 2020	CB	(England)	Charley Doyle	Released (Note: Joined Stalybridge Celtic on 2 September)	n\a	
24 July 2020	CF	(England)	Danny Graham	Released (Note: Joined Sunderland on 7 September)	n\a	
24 July 2020	CF	(England)	Dominic Samuel	Released (Note: Joined Gillingham on 21 September)	n\a	
24 July 2020	CM	(England)	Richard Smallwood	Released (Note: Joined Hull City on 11 August)	n\a	
24 July 2020	LB	(England)	Sam Hart	Released (Note: Joined Southend United on 11 November)	n\a	
24 July 2020	GK	(Canada)	Jayson Leutwiler	Released (Note: Joined Fleetwood Town on 11 September)	n\a	
24 July 2020	CB	(France)	Flavien Enzo Boyomo	End of Contract (Note: Joined Atlético Albacete on 12 August)	n\a	
29 July 2020	CB	(England)	Matthew Platt	(England) Barrow	Undisclosed	
16 October 2020	GK	(England)	Andy Fisher	(England) Milton Keynes Dons	Undisclosed	

Total incoming: +/- ~£ 0

==== Loans in ====
Date from	Position	Nationality	Name	From	Length	Ref.
16 October 2020	LB	(Scotland)	Barry Douglas	(England) Leeds United	Season-long	
16 October 2020	CM	(Germany)	Tom Trybull	(England) Norwich City	Season-long	
16 October 2020	RW	(England)	Harvey Elliott	(England) Liverpool	Season-long	

==== Loans out ====
Date from	Position	Nationality	Name	To	Length	Ref.
28 July 2020	CM	(England)	Tom White	(England) Bolton Wanderers	Season-long (Recalled)	
6 October 2020	CM	(Spain)	Stefan Mols	(Spain) Intercity	Season-long (Recalled)	
16 October 2020	CB	(Scotland)	Charlie Mulgrew	(England) Fleetwood Town	Season-long	
6 November 2020	CB	(England)	Tyler Magloire	(England) Hartlepool United	9 January 2021	
13 November 2020	RW	(England)	Luke Brennan	(England) AFC Fylde	Season-long (Recalled)	

=== Winter ===
==== Transfers in ====
Date	Position	Nationality	Name	From	Fee	Ref.	Other.
15 January 2021	CM	(England)	Joe Nolan	(England) Unattached (Note: Last played for Runcorn Linnets)	Free Transfer		Signed for Blackburn Rovers U23's
1 February 2021	LB	(England)	Harry Pickering	(England) Crewe Alexandra	Undisclosed		

Total outgoing: +/- ~£

==== Transfers out ====
Date from	Position	Nationality	Name	To	Fee	Ref.
4 March 2021	CB	(Republic of Ireland)	Derrick Williams	(United States) LA Galaxy	Free Transfer	

Total incoming: +/- ~£ 0

==== Loans in ====
Date from	Position	Nationality	Name	From	Length	Ref.
14 January 2021	CB	(England)	Jarrad Branthwaite	(England) Everton	Season-long	
1 February 2021	CB	(England)	Taylor Harwood-Bellis	(England) Manchester City	Season-long	

==== Loans out ====
Date from	Position	Nationality	Name	To	Length	Ref.
31 December 2020	RW	(England)	Harry Chapman	(England) Shrewsbury Town	Season-long	
6 January 2021	CM	(Northern Ireland)	Brad Lyons	(England) Morecambe	Season-long	
6 January 2021	CB	(England)	Hayden Carter	(England) Burton Albion	Season-long	
12 January 2021	GK	(England)	Joe Hilton	(England) Fleetwood Town	7 day emergency loan	
27 January 2021	GK	(England)	Joe Hilton	(Scotland) Ross County	Season-long	
1 February 2021	LB	(England)	Harry Pickering	(England) Crewe Alexandra	Season-long	
1 February 2021	CB	(England)	Joe Grayson	(England) Oxford United	Season-long	
1 February 2021	CF	(Wales)	Jack Vale	(England) Rochdale	Season-long	
2 February 2021	CB	(England)	Tyler Magloire	(Scotland) Motherwell	Season-long	
5 February 2021	CM	(England)	Tom White	(England) Hartlepool United	One-month	
