= 2019–20 Blackburn Rovers F.C. season =

Blackburn Rovers
2019–20 season
- CEO: Steve Waggott
- Manager: Tony Mowbray
- Stadium: Ewood Park
- Championship: 11th
- FA Cup: Third round
- EFL Cup: Second round
- Top goalscorer: League: Adam Armstrong (16); All: Adam Armstrong (17)
- Highest home attendance: League/All: 19,963 vs Preston North End (11 January 2020)
- Lowest home attendance: League: 11,401 vs Brentford (27 November 2019); All: 5,215 vs Oldham Athletic (13 August 2019, EFL Cup)
- Average home league attendance: 14,009
Home colours	Away colours	Third colours

The 2019–20 season was Blackburn Rovers' 132nd season as a professional football club and it participated in the Championship for a second consecutive season. Along with competing in the Championship, the club also participated in the FA Cup and the EFL Cup. The season covered the period from 1 July 2019 to 22 July 2020.

== Summer activity ==
=== May ===
On 11 May, Rovers announced that young defender Matthew Platt had signed a new one-year contract with the club until the summer of 2020.

On 14 May, Rovers reached decisions regarding players whose contracts are due to expire on 30 June.

Goalkeeper Jayson Leutwiler has been informed that the option to extend his registration by a further year to June 2020 has been taken up by the club.

Discussions are currently taking place with Craig Conway, Jack Rodwell and Ben Gladwin regarding the possibility of extending their stays at Ewood Park.

Paul Downing, Jack Doyle, Lewis Mansell, Charlie Albinson, George Wilson (scholar) and Kyle Connell (scholar) will not be retained by the club upon the expiration of their current contracts at the end of next month.

On 25 May, Craig Conway announced via his Twitter account that he would be departing the club at the end of his current contract, bringing an end to his 5 & half year stay at the club.

=== June ===
On 13 June, Partick Thistle announced Lewis Mansell will join the club on 1 July when his Rovers contract ends, Mansell had previously been on loan at the club.

On 21 June, Rovers announced their first signing of the summer, midfielder Stuart Downing will join the club on 1 July when his Middlesbrough contract ends, he's signed a 12-month contract until 2020. On the same day, Portsmouth announced Paul Downing will join the club on 1 July when his Rovers contract ends.

On 30 June 2019 Jack Rodwell and Ben Gladwin's contracts expired without any agreement on new contracts. As such they are free agents.

=== July ===
On 1 July, Rovers announced the signing of 19 year old goalkeeper Joe Hilton following his release from Everton on a 2-year deal, he'll initially link up with the u23s.

On 2 July, Rovers announced under 23s head coach Damien Johnson has been promoted to the role of first team technical coach and head of player development.

On 5 July, Rovers announced the signing of midfielder Bradley Johnson from Derby County on a free transfer, he's signed a 2-year deal.

On 6 July, Rovers announced that goalkeeper David Raya had joined Brentford for an undisclosed fee. It was also revealed that Charlie Adam had been training with the club and he featured for Rovers in the second half of the friendly match against Barrow. Derby County midfielder Jacob Butterfield was also revealed to be training with the club.

On 9 July, Rovers announced the signing of young midfielder Tom White from Gateshead on a 2-year deal, he will initially link up with the u23s.

On 13 July, Rovers announced the signing of Southampton striker Sam Gallagher for an undisclosed fee, on a four-year deal. Also Southport announced the signing of goalkeeper Charlie Albinson following his release from Rovers.

On 22 July, Rovers announced that midfielder Lewis Travis had signed a new 4-year contract until 2023, with the option of a further 12 months.

On 23 July, Rovers announced that goalkeeper Christian Walton had joined on loan until the end of the season from Brighton & Hove Albion.

On 26 July, Rovers announced that defender Scott Wharton had signed a new deal until 2022 & joined Northampton Town on loan until the end of the season.

On 29 July, it was announced that Under-13 lead coach George Boateng had joined Aston Villa to take up a position as Under-18 lead coach.

On 31 July, Rovers announced that defender Tosin Adarabioyo had joined on loan until the end of the season from Manchester City.

=== August ===
On 1 August Southport announced the signing of defender Jack Doyle following his release from Rovers. Rovers also announced striker Joe Nuttall had joined Blackpool for undisclosed fee.

On 8 August Rovers announced that defender Tyler Magloire had joined Rochdale on loan until the end of the season, Rovers also announced defender Greg Cunningham had joined on loan from Cardiff City until the end of the season.

On 9 August Rovers announced that defender Charlie Mulgrew had joined Wigan Athletic on loan until the end of the season.

On 19 August Rovers announced under 18s head coach Billy Barr had been promoted to head coach of the under 23s & Mike Sheron has agreed to take over as the new under 18s lead coach, having spent several seasons as professional development phase assistant coach at the club.

On 23 August Rovers announced goalkeeper Andy Fisher had joined Northampton Town on loan until 1 January 2020.

On 30 August Rovers announced that defender Matthew Platt had joined Barrow on loan until the end of the season,

=== September ===
On 13 September Rovers announced young defender Andy Jackson had joined Clitheroe on a months loan.

On 19 September Rovers announced the signing of attacking midfielder Lewis Holtby following his release from Hamburg on a 2-year deal.

=== October ===
On 4 October Rovers announced young forward Jack Vale had signed a long-term contract at the club until 2023.

=== November ===
On 15 November Rovers announced that defender Tom White had joined Barrow on loan until January.

== Winter activity ==
=== January ===
On 2 January Rovers announced midfielder Ben Gladwin & defender Andy Jackson had been released.

On 10 January Milton Keynes Dons announced the signing of Ben Gladwin following his release from Rovers.

On 13 January Rovers announced midfielder Tom White had extended his loan at Barrow until the end of the season, Rovers also announced young defender Isaac Whitehall had signed a long-term contract at the club until 2022.

On 15 January Rovers announced defender Charlie Mulgrew had returned to the club from a loan spell at Wigan Athletic at the players request.

On 17 January Rovers announced defender Greg Cunningham had returned to parent club Cardiff City, Rovers also announced defender Sam Hart had joined Shrewsbury Town on loan until the end of the season.

On 29 January Rovers announced defender Tyler Magloire had been recalled from his loan from Rochdale.

On 31 January Rovers announced goalkeeper Andy Fisher had joined Milton Keynes Dons on loan until the end of the season.

=== February ===
On 1 February Rovers signed winger D'Margio Wright-Phillips on a youth loan from Manchester City until the end of the season, he is the son of Shaun Wright-Phillips.

=== March ===
On 5 March Rovers announced young striker Jack Vale had joined Barrow on loan until the end of the season, Rovers also announced young left back Lewis Thompson had joined AFC Fylde on loan until the end of the season.

On 13 March The EFL announced the season was suspended until 3 April 2020, due to the COVID-19 pandemic, Also Rovers announced young defender Jake Garrett had signed his 1st professional contract at the club until 2022.

=== June ===
On 9 June Rovers announced young central defender Hayden Carter & young left back Lewis Thompson had signed new contracts, Carter signed a 2-year contract until 2022 & Thompson signed a 1-year contract until 2021. Rovers also announced fellow academy graduates Jack Evans & Charley Doyle will not be retained by the club when their contracts expire at the end of the month.

On 15 June Rovers announced Scott Wharton will remain on loan at Northampton Town to play in the League Two playoffs.

On 19 June Rovers announced Christian Walton will remain on loan until the end of the extended season.

On 24 June Rovers announced their retained list Danny Graham, Stewart Downing, Dominic Samuel, Jayson Leutwiler, Richie Smallwood & Sam Hart have all signed contract extensions until the end of the current extended season & discussions will be held regarding their future at the club beyond the season.

From the development squad Rovers took the option to extend Matthew Platt contract by 12 months until 2021, whilst Brad Lyons & Ben Paton have both been offered new contracts, Jordan Eastham has signed a contract till 2022 while Sam Burns, Dan Pike, Jalil Saadi, Sam Durrant & James Connelly have signed contracts until 2021. Luke Brennan & Flavien Enzo Boyomo have been offered professional contracts but have yet to sign. Chanka Zimba, Jack Evans & Charley Doyle will not be retained by the club while D'Margio Wright-Phillips has returned to parent club Manchester City.

On 29 June Rovers announced Tosin Adarabioyo will remain on loan until the end of the extended season.

=== July ===
On 21 July Rovers announced Adam Armstrong's goal against Cardiff City had been voted goal of the season.

On 22 July Rovers announced Adam Armstrong had been voted player of the season.

On 23 July Rovers announced John Buckley had won young player of the year & Lewis Travis had won the Peter Jackson man of the match award.

== Squad information ==
Squad no.	Name	Nationality	Position(s)	Date of birth (age)	Contract expires	Other
Goalkeepers
45	Jordan Eastham	(England)	GK	8 September 2001 (age 25)	2022	
33	Andy Fisher	(England)	GK	12 February 1998 (age 28)	2021	on loan at Milton Keynes Dons
40	Joe Hilton	(England)	GK	11 October 1999 (age 26)	2021	
13	Jayson Leutwiler	(Canada)	GK	25 April 1989 (age 37)	2020	
1	Christian Walton	(England)	GK	9 November 1995 (age 30)	2020	on loan from Brighton & Hove Albion
Defenders
24	Tosin Adarabioyo	(England)	DF	24 September 1997 (age 28)	2020	on loan from Manchester City
17	Amari'i Bell	(England)	DF	5 May 1994 (age 32)	2021	
41	Hayden Carter	(England)	DF	17 December 1999 (age 26)	2022	
35	Joe Grayson	(England)	DF	26 March 1999 (age 27)	2021	
30	Sam Hart	(England)	DF	10 September 1996 (age 30)	2020	on loan at Shrewsbury Town
26	Darragh Lenihan	(Republic of Ireland)	DF	16 March 1994 (age 32)	2022	
38	Tyler Magloire	(England)	DF	21 December 1998 (age 27)	2022	
14	Charlie Mulgrew	(Scotland)	DF	6 March 1986 (age 40)	2021	
2	Ryan Nyambe	(Namibia)	DF	4 December 1997 (age 28)	2021	
36	Matthew Platt	(England)	DF	3 October 1997 (age 28)	2021	on loan at Barrow
	Scott Wharton	(England)	DF	3 October 1997 (age 28)	2022	on loan at Northampton Town
3	Derrick Williams	(Republic of Ireland)	DF	17 January 1993 (age 33)	2021	
Midfielders
31	Elliott Bennett	(Jamaica)	MF	18 December 1988 (age 37)	2021	
39	John Buckley	(England)	MF	13 October 1999 (age 26)	2022	
11	Harry Chapman	(England)	MF	5 November 1997 (age 28)	2021	
23	Bradley Dack	(England)	MF	31 December 1993 (age 32)	2021	
19	Stewart Downing	(England)	MF	22 July 1984 (age 42)	2020	
18	Jacob Davenport	(England)	MF	28 December 1998 (age 27)	2022	
29	Corry Evans	(Northern Ireland)	MF	30 July 1990 (age 36)	2021	
22	Lewis Holtby	(Germany)	MF	18 September 1990 (age 35)	2021	
4	Bradley Johnson	(England)	MF	28 April 1987 (age 39)	2021	
37	Joe Rankin-Costello	(England)	MF	26 July 1999 (age 27)	2021	
8	Joe Rothwell	(England)	MF	11 January 1995 (age 31)	2021	
6	Richie Smallwood	(England)	MF	29 December 1990 (age 35)	2020	
27	Lewis Travis	(England)	MF	16 October 1997 (age 28)	2023	Option for 12 months extension
Forwards
7	Adam Armstrong	(England)	FW	10 February 1997 (age 29)	2022	
20	Ben Brereton	(England)	FW	18 April 1999 (age 27)	2022	
34	Daniel Butterworth	(England)	FW	14 September 1999 (age 27)	2022	
9	Sam Gallagher	(England)	FW	15 September 1995 (age 31)	2023	
10	Danny Graham	(England)	FW	12 August 1985 (age 41)	2020	
12	Dominic Samuel	(England)	FW	1 April 1994 (age 32)	2020	
44	Jack Vale	(Wales)	FW	3 March 2001 (age 25)	2023	

== Pre-season and friendlies ==
=== Pre-season ===
Blackburn Rovers announced six pre-season friendlies against National League North's Barrow, EFL League One's Rochdale, newly promoted side Bury, and Blackpool, EFL League Two's Mansfield Town, and Scottish Premiership side Rangers.

6 July 2019 Friendly	Barrow	1–2	Blackburn Rovers	Barrow-in-Furness
15:00 BST	Quigley 39'	Report	Trialist 16' (o.g.); Nuttall 64'	Stadium: Furness Building Society Stadium

13 July 2019 Friendly	Blackburn Rovers	5–1	Rochdale	Ribble Valley
BCD	Lenihan; Graham; Hart; Brereton,	Report	Goal	Stadium: Brockhall

14 July 2019 Friendly (Cancelled)	Rochdale	v	Blackburn Rovers	Rochdale
15:00 BST				Stadium: Crown Oil Arena
Note: On 12 July, the scheduled away fixture against Rochdale was postponed due to pitch related issues.

17 July 2019 Friendly	Blackburn Rovers	3–1	Macclesfield Town	Ribble Valley
BCD	Adam, Nuttall	Report	Goal	Stadium: Brockhall

17 July 2019 Friendly	Mansfield Town	1–3	Blackburn Rovers	Mansfield
19:30 BST	Pearce 53'	Report	Magloire 10'; Buckley 52'; Armstrong 85'	Stadium: One Call Stadium; Attendance: 1,701; Referee: John Brooks

21 July 2019 Friendly	Rangers	1–1	Blackburn Rovers	Glasgow
15:00 BST	Defoe 30'	Report	Travis 65'	Stadium: Ibrox Stadium; Attendance: 18,627; Referee: Don Robertson

24 July 2019 Friendly	Bury	0–3	Blackburn Rovers	Bury
19:45 BST		Report	Rothwell 26'; Brereton 38'; Armstrong 90'	Stadium: Energy Check Stadium; Attendance: 1,351

27 July 2019 Friendly	Blackpool	0–2	Blackburn Rovers	Blackpool
15:00 BST		Report	Armstrong 3'; Brereton 78'	Stadium: Bloomfield Road; Referee: Oliver Langford

=== Mid-season ===
11 June 2020 Friendly	Liverpool	6–0	Blackburn Rovers	Liverpool
15:00 BST	Mané 10'; Keïta 23'; Minamino 36'; Matip 68'; Hoever 69'; Clarkson 84'	Report		Stadium: Anfield; Attendance: 0

== Championship season ==
=== League table ===
Pos	Team	Pld	W	D	L	GF	GA	GD	Pts
8	Millwall	46	17	17	12	57	51	+6	68
9	Preston North End	46	18	12	16	59	54	+5	66
10	Derby County	46	17	13	16	62	64	−2	64
11	Blackburn Rovers	46	17	12	17	66	63	+3	63
12	Bristol City	46	17	12	17	60	65	−5	63
13	Queens Park Rangers	46	16	10	20	67	76	−9	58
14	Reading	46	15	11	20	59	58	+1	56

Source: EFL Official Website
Rules for classification: 1) Points; 2) Goal difference; 3) Number of goals scored; 4) Head-to-head results; 5) Wins; 6) Away goals; 7) Penalty points (sec 9.5); 8) 12-point sending off offences

=== Matchday ===
On Thursday, 20 June 2019, the EFL Championship fixtures were revealed.

3 August 2019 1	Blackburn Rovers	1–2	Charlton Athletic	Blackburn
15:00 BST	Phillips 54' (o.g.)	Report	Sarr (yellow card) 8'; Purrington 43'; Forster-Caskey (yellow card) 73'; Taylor (yellow card) 77'; Lapslie (yellow card) 80'	Stadium: Ewood Park; Attendance: 14,184; Referee: Andy Woolmer

10 August 2019 2	Fulham	2–0	Blackburn Rovers	Fulham
15:00 BST	Cairney 35'; Mitrović 81'	Report	Johnson (yellow card) 61'; Bennett (yellow card) 86'	Stadium: Craven Cottage; Attendance: 17,987; Referee: Keith Stroud

17 August 2019 3	Blackburn Rovers	1–0	Middlesbrough	Blackburn
15:00 BST	Graham 25' (pen.); Cunningham (yellow card) 27'; Bennett (yellow card) 31'; Johnson (yellow card) 49'; Travis (yellow card) 69'; Williams (yellow card) 89'	Report	Dijksteel (yellow card) 24'; Ayala (yellow card) 26'; Wing (yellow card) 84'	Stadium: Ewood Park; Attendance: 14,012; Referee: Jarred Gillett

20 August 2019 4	Hull City	0–1	Blackburn Rovers	Kingston upon Hull
19:45 BST	Bowen (penalty missed) 13'; Stewart (yellow card) 38'; Eaves (yellow card) 53'; Kingsley (yellow card) 61'; Bowler (yellow card) 80'	Report	Williams 62'; Lenihan (yellow card) 81'	Stadium: KCOM Stadium; Attendance: 10,240; Referee: Jeremy Simpson
Note: Live on Sky Sports

24 August 2019 5	Blackburn Rovers	0–0	Cardiff City	Blackburn
15:00 BST	Bennett (yellow card) 33'	Report	Tomlin (yellow card) 55'; Bogle (yellow card) 72'; Bennett (yellow card) 86'	Stadium: Ewood Park; Attendance: 13,291; Referee: David Coote

31 August 2019 6	West Bromwich Albion	3–2	Blackburn Rovers	West Bromwich
15:00 BST	Phillips 22'; Livermore 31'; Diangana 40'; Ferguson (yellow card) 65'; Pereira (yellow card) 79'	Report	Dack 1'; Lenihan (yellow card) 40'; Johnson 45+2'; Travis (yellow card) 69'	Stadium: The Hawthorns; Attendance: 23,792; Referee: Tony Harrington

14 September 2019 7	Blackburn Rovers	2–0	Millwall	Blackburn
15:00 BST	Williams 18'; Dack 74'	Report	Cooper (yellow card) 56'	Stadium: Ewood Park; Attendance: 11,873; Referee: Dean Whitestone

21 September 2019 8	Reading	1–2	Blackburn Rovers	Reading
15:00 BST	Yiadom (yellow card) 32'; Morrison (yellow card) 37'; Swift 57'	Report	Armstrong 8'; Dack 48'; Cunningham (yellow card) 79'; Bennett (yellow card) 90+3'	Stadium: Madejski Stadium; Attendance: 16,906; Referee: Matt Donohue

28 September 2019 9	Blackburn Rovers	1–2	Luton Town	Blackburn
15:00 BST	Travis 37' (yellow card) 84'	Report	Collins 17'; Butterfield (yellow card) 55'; Pearson 57'; Potts (yellow card) 90+5'	Stadium: Ewood Park; Attendance: 15,319; Referee: Gavin Ward

1 October 2019 10	Blackburn Rovers	1–1	Nottingham Forest	Blackburn
19:45 BST	Lenihan (yellow card) 22'; Downing (yellow card) 60'; Armstrong 63'	Report	Ameobi (yellow card) 33'; Lolley 65'	Stadium: Ewood Park; Attendance: 12,521; Referee: Steve Martin

5 October 2019 11	Queens Park Rangers	4–2	Blackburn Rovers	Shepherd's Bush
15:00 BST	Wells 30'; Eze 49'; Barbet (yellow card) 56'; Osayi-Samuel 60'; Cameron (yellow card) 65'; Hugill 77' (yellow card) 90+2'; Manning (yellow card) 90+1'	Report	Evans (yellow card) 6'; Lenihan (yellow card) 45+1'; Dack 57' (pen.); Bell (yellow card) 58'; Armstrong 86'; Williams (yellow card) 90+2'	Stadium: Kiyan Prince Foundation Stadium; Attendance: 13,560; Referee: Simon Hooper

18 October 2019 12	Blackburn Rovers	2–2	Huddersfield Town	Blackburn
12:30 BST	Holtby 20'; Dack 33'; Travis (yellow card) 45+1'	Report	Grant 13' (pen.); Bacuna 63'; Hogg (yellow card) 78'; Kachunga (yellow card) 85'; Campbell (yellow card) 88'	Stadium: Ewood Park; Attendance: 13,761; Referee: Darren Bond

22 October 2019 13	Birmingham City	1–0	Blackburn Rovers	Bordesley
19:45 BST	Colin 31'; Dean (yellow card) 55'; Davis (yellow card) 67'	Report	Williams (yellow card) 85'; Buckley (yellow card) 90+2'	Stadium: St Andrew's Trillion Trophy Stadium; Attendance: 18,561; Referee: Darren England

26 October 2019 14	Preston North End	3–2	Blackburn Rovers	Preston
15:00 BST	Barkhuizen 53', 82'; Johnson 65' (pen.)	Report	Rudd 1' (o.g.); Gallagher 11' (yellow card) 68'; Dack (yellow card) 87'	Stadium: Deepdale; Attendance: 19,165; Referee: Stephen Martin

2 November 2019 15	Blackburn Rovers	2–1	Sheffield Wednesday	Blackburn
15:00 GMT	Adarabioyo 88'; Buckley 90+1'	Report	Murphy 83'	Stadium: Ewood Park; Attendance: 14,147; Referee: Andy Woolmer

9 November 2019 16	Leeds United	2–1	Blackburn Rovers	Leeds
15:00 GMT	Bamford 30' (pen.); Harrison (yellow card) 35'; Phillips (yellow card) 80'	Report	Williams 40' (yellow card) 54'; Buckley (yellow card) 75'	Stadium: Elland Road; Attendance: 35,567; Referee: Gavin Ward

23 November 2019 17	Blackburn Rovers	3–2	Barnsley	Blackburn
15:00 GMT	Dack 24', 86'; Gallagher (yellow card) 56'; Downing 69'	Report	Brown (yellow card) 22'; Chaplin 48'; Woodrow 82'	Stadium: Ewood Park; Attendance: 13,781; Referee: Dean Whitestone

27 November 2019 18	Blackburn Rovers	1–0	Brentford	Blackburn
19:45 GMT	Dack 11' (yellow card) 44'; Evans (yellow card) 79'	Report	Roerslev (yellow card) 90+1'	Stadium: Ewood Park; Attendance: 11,401; Referee: Matthew Donohue

30 November 2019 19	Stoke City	1–2	Blackburn Rovers	Stoke-on-Trent
15:00 GMT	Evans 80' (o.g.)	Report	Dack 13'; Gallagher 84'	Stadium: bet365 Stadium; Attendance: 22,292; Referee: Kevin Friend

7 December 2019 20	Blackburn Rovers	1–0	Derby County	Blackburn
15:00 GMT	Armstrong 57'; Evans (yellow card) 62'	Report	Lawrence (yellow card) 18'	Stadium: Ewood Park; Attendance: 12,800; Referee: Oliver Langford

11 December 2019 21	Swansea City	1–1	Blackburn Rovers	Swansea
19:45 GMT	Ayew 10'; Carroll (yellow card) 32' (yellow-red card) 57'	Report	Graham 4'; Dack (yellow card) 8' (yellow-red card) 67'	Stadium: Liberty Stadium; Referee: Jeremy Simpson

14 December 2019 22	Bristol City	0–2	Blackburn Rovers	Ashton Gate
15:00 GMT	Weimann (yellow card) 79'	Report	Johnson 2'; Gallagher (yellow card) 33'; Armstrong 77'; Lenihan (yellow card) 86'	Stadium: Ashton Gate Stadium; Attendance: 21,180; Referee: John Brooks

23 December 2019 23	Blackburn Rovers	0-0	Wigan Athletic	Blackburn
19:45 GMT	Rothwell (yellow card) 90+6'	Report	Morsy (yellow card) 38'; Windass (yellow card) 88'	Stadium: Ewood Park; Attendance: 18,726; Referee: Gavin Ward

26 December 2019 24	Blackburn Rovers	1–1	Birmingham City	Blackburn
15:00 GMT	Armstrong 55' (pen.); Johnson (yellow card) 60'; Nyambe (yellow card) 70'; Bennett (yellow card) 82'	Report	Mrabti (yellow card) 23' (goal) 63' (pen.); Gardner (yellow card) 76'; Pedersen (yellow card) 85'	Stadium: Ewood Park; Attendance: 15,887; Referee: Robert Jones

29 December 2019 25	Huddersfield Town	2–1	Blackburn Rovers	Huddersfield
15:00	Stanković 25'; Mounié 71'; Hadergjonaj (yellow card) 76'; Campbell (yellow card) 79'	Report	Graham 7'; Bennett (yellow card) 90+7'	Stadium: John Smith's Stadium; Attendance: 22,859; Referee: Andy Woolmer

1 January 2020 26	Nottingham Forest	3–2	Blackburn Rovers	West Bridgford
15:00 GMT	Lolley 22'; Grabban 25' (pen.), 55'; Sow (yellow card) 45+1'	Report	Downing 39'; Worrall 71' (o.g.); Bell (yellow card) 90+2'	Stadium: City Ground; Attendance: 27,073; Referee: Darren Bond

11 January 2020 27	Blackburn Rovers	1–1	Preston North End	Blackburn
15:00 GMT	Armstrong 3'; Lenihan (yellow card) 51'; Travis (yellow card) 67'	Report	Harrop 17'	Stadium: Ewood Park; Attendance: 19,963; Referee: James Linington

18 January 2020 28	Sheffield Wednesday	0–5	Blackburn Rovers	Sheffield
15:00 GMT	Borner (yellow card) 14'; Luongo (red card) 23'	Report	Holtby 19', 45+1'; Dawson 36' (o.g.); Lenihan 48'; Rothwell (yellow card) 55'; Gallagher 90+2'	Stadium: Hillsborough Stadium; Attendance: 23,504; Referee: Jarred Gillett

28 January 2020 29	Blackburn Rovers	2–1	Queens Park Rangers	Blackburn
19:45 GMT	Armstrong 10'; Lenihan 30' (yellow card) 74'	Report	Hugill 22'; Chair (yellow card) 57'; Cameron (yellow card) 58'; Amos (yellow card) 62'	Stadium: Ewood Park; Attendance: 11,505; Referee: Darren Bond

1 February 2020 30	Middlesbrough	1–1	Blackburn Rovers	Middlesbrough
15:00 GMT	Coulson 75'	Report	Travis 58' (yellow card) 85'; Lenihan (yellow card) 87'	Stadium: Riverside Stadium; Attendance: 19,937; Referee: Matt Donohue

8 February 2020 31	Blackburn Rovers	0–1	Fulham	Blackburn
15:00 GMT		Report	Mitrović 65'; Decordova-Reid (yellow card) 79'	Stadium: Ewood Park; Attendance: 13,087; Referee: Tony Harrington

11 February 2020 32	Blackburn Rovers	3–0	Hull City	Blackburn
19:45 GMT	Lenihan 73'; Armstrong 79'; Samuel 80'; Travis (yellow card) 89'	Report	Elder (yellow card) 36'; Honeyman (yellow card) 86'	Stadium: Ewood Park; Attendance: 11,888; Referee: Jeremy Simpson

15 February 2020 33	Charlton Athletic	0–2	Blackburn Rovers	Charlton
15:00 GMT		Report	Buckley 29' (yellow card) 34'; Adarabioyo 37'; Samuel (yellow card) 41'; Lenihan (yellow card) 55'	Stadium: The Valley; Attendance: 25,363; Referee: Andy Davies

22 February 2020 34	Brentford	2–2	Blackburn Rovers	Brentford
12:30 GMT	Watkins 62'; Benrahma 71' (pen.); Mbeumo (yellow card) 81'	Report	Armstrong 11', 54' (pen.)	Stadium: Griffin Park; Attendance: 12,082; Referee: Tim Robinson

26 February 2020 35	Blackburn Rovers	0–0	Stoke City	Blackburn
19:45 GMT	Lenihan (yellow card) 13'; Nyambe (yellow card) 81'	Report	Thompson (yellow card) 30'; Clucas (yellow card) 90'	Stadium: Ewood Park; Attendance: 12,343; Referee: Darren Bond

29 February 2020 36	Blackburn Rovers	2–2	Swansea City	Blackburn
15:00 GMT	Gallagher 25'; Travis (yellow card) 46'; Graham (penalty missed) 67'; Johnson (yellow card) 78' (goal) 90+5'; Bennett (yellow card) 90+2'	Report	Garrick (yellow card) 9'; Brewster 45' (yellow card) 45'; Ayew 48' (pen.); Fulton (yellow card) 65'; Grimes (yellow card) 72'; Naughton (yellow card) 82'	Stadium: Ewood Park; Attendance: 13,099; Referee: Peter Bankes

8 March 2020 37	Derby County	3–0	Blackburn Rovers	Derby
15:00 GMT	Sibley 26' (yellow card) 75'; Martin 41', 85' (pen.); Bird (yellow card) 72'	Report	Travis (yellow card) 25'; Rothwell (yellow card) 45+1'; Bennett (yellow card) 84'; Buckley (red card) 90+3'	Stadium: Pride Park Stadium; Attendance: 26,590; Referee: John Brooks

20 June 2020 38	Blackburn Rovers	3–1	Bristol City	Blackburn
15:00 BST	Evans 37' (yellow card) 87'; Lenihan (yellow card) 56'; Adarabioyo 61'; Armstrong 71'	Report	Pereira (yellow card) 12'; Massengo (yellow card) 16'; Paterson 34'	Stadium: Ewood Park; Attendance: 0 Referee: Oliver Langford
Note: Season was suspended until 3 April 2020, due to the COVID-19 pandemic. The match was rescheduled to 20 June.

27 June 2020 39	Wigan Athletic	2–0	Blackburn Rovers	Wigan
15:00 BST	Evans 80'; Kipré (yellow card) 90'; Jacobs 90+4'	Report		Stadium: DW Stadium; Attendance: 0 Referee: Darren England
Note: Season was suspended until 3 April 2020, due to the COVID-19 pandemic. The match was rescheduled to 27 June.

30 June 2020 40	Barnsley	2–0	Blackburn Rovers	Barnsley
18:00 BST	Simões (yellow card) 39'; Chaplin 58'; Brown 76'	Report	Brereton (red card) 74'; Davenport (yellow card) 90+1'; Chapman (yellow card) 90+3'	Stadium: Oakwell; Attendance: 0 Referee: Tony Harrington
Note: Season was suspended until 3 April 2020, due to the COVID-19 pandemic. The match was rescheduled to 30 June.

4 July 2020 41	Blackburn Rovers	1–3	Leeds United	Blackburn
15:00 BST	Armstrong 48'; Walton (yellow card) 74'	Report	Bamford 7'; Klich (yellow card) 25', (goal) 53'; Ayling (yellow card) 28'; Phillips 40'	Stadium: Ewood Park; Attendance: 0 Referee: Robert Jones
Note: On 3 April, the English Football League decided to postpone all football until safe to do so due to the COVID-19 pandemic. The match was rescheduled to 4 July.

7 July 2020 42	Cardiff City	2–3	Blackburn Rovers	Cardiff
19:45 BST	Vaulks 14'; Glatzel 41'	Report	Graham 22'; Samuel 46'; Armstrong 70'; Travis (yellow card) 88'	Stadium: Cardiff City Stadium; Attendance: 0 Referee: Matt Donohue
Note: On 3 April, the English Football League decided to postpone all football until safe to do so due to the COVID-19 pandemic. The match was rescheduled to 7 July.

11 July 2020 43	Blackburn Rovers	1–1	West Bromwich Albion	Blackburn
15:00 BST	Rothwell 63'; Travis (yellow card) 62'; Lenihan (yellow card) 90+2'	Report	Livermore (yellow card) 31'; Krovinović 41'; Ajayi (yellow card) 90'	Stadium: Ewood Park; Attendance: 0 Referee: Jarred Gillett
Note: On 3 April, the English Football League decided to postpone all football until safe to do so due to the COVID-19 pandemic. The match was rescheduled to 11 July.

14 July 2020 44	Millwall	1–0	Blackburn Rovers	Bermondsey
19:45 BST	Bennett 20'; Woods (yellow card) 84'; Cooper (yellow card) 89'	Report	Rankin-Costello (yellow card) 1'; Travis (yellow card) 35'	Stadium: The Den; Attendance: 0 Referee: John Brooks
Note: On 3 April, the English Football League decided to postpone all football until safe to do so due to the COVID-19 pandemic. The match was rescheduled to 14 July.

18 July 2020 45	Blackburn Rovers	4–3	Reading	Blackburn
15:00 BST	Brereton 3'; Armstrong 6'; Rothwell 56'; Davenport (yellow card) 71'; Gallagher 87'	Report	Swift 15'; Baldock 64'; Méïté 68'	Stadium: Ewood Park; Attendance: 0 Referee: Tim Robinson
Note: On 3 April, the English Football League decided to postpone all football until safe to do so due to the COVID-19 pandemic. The match was rescheduled to 18 July.

22 July 2020 46	Luton Town	3–2	Blackburn Rovers	Luton
19:30 BST	Carter 28' (o.g.); Johnson 35' (o.g.); Collins 60' (pen.); Cornick (yellow card) 65'; Carter-Vickers (yellow card) 83'; Hylton (yellow card) 88'; Berry (yellow card) 90+5'	Report	Armstrong 10'; Travis (yellow card) 37'; Gallagher 75'	Stadium: Kenilworth Road; Attendance: 0 Referee: Darren Bond
Note: On 3 April, the English Football League decided to postpone all football until safe to do so due to the COVID-19 pandemic. The match was rescheduled to 22 July.

== EFL Cup ==
The first round draw was made on 20 June. The second round draw was made on 13 August 2019 following the conclusion of all but one first-round matches.

13 August 2019 First round	Blackburn Rovers	3–2	Oldham Athletic	Blackburn
19:45 BST	Dack 70'; Cunningham (yellow card) 90'; Downing 90+2'; Rothwell 90+5'	Report	Nepomuceno 14'; Maouche (yellow card) 41', (goal) 80'; Smith-Brown (yellow card) 70'	Stadium: Ewood Park; Attendance: 5,215; Referee: Tom Nield

27 August 2019 Second round	Sheffield United	2–1	Blackburn Rovers	Sheffield
19:45 BST	Stearman (yellow card) 7' (goal) 31'; Norwood 45+3'; Morrison (yellow card) 90+1'	Report	Armstrong (penalty missed) 7'; Gallagher 72'; Lenihan (yellow card) 78'; Cunningham (yellow card) 89'	Stadium: Bramall Lane; Attendance: 9,714; Referee: Geoff Eltringham

== FA Cup ==
4 January 2020 Third round	Birmingham City	2–1	Blackburn Rovers	Bordesley
15:00 GMT	Crowley 4'; Bela 90'	Report	Armstrong 61' (pen.)	Stadium: St Andrew's Trillion Trophy Stadium; Attendance: 7,330; Referee: Oliver Langford

== Backroom staff ==
Position	Staff
Manager	(England) Tony Mowbray
Assistant manager	(England) Mark Venus
First-team coach	(England) David Lowe
First-team coach	(Northern Ireland) Damien Johnson
Goalkeeping coach	(England) Ben Benson
Head of Academy	(England) Stuart Jones
Head of Academy coaching	(England) Tony Carss
Under-23 lead coach	(England) Billy Barr
Under-18 lead coach	(England) Mike Sheron

Last updated: May 2017

== 1st Team squad statistics ==
As of 22 July 2020

No.	Pos	Nat	Player	Total		Championship		FA Cup		EFL Cup	
No.	Pos	Nat	Player	Apps	Goals	Apps	Goals	Apps	Goals	Apps	Goals
1	GK	(England) ENG	Christian Walton (on loan from Brighton & Hove Albion)	46	0	46+0	0	0+0	0	0+0	0
13	GK	(Canada) CAN	Jayson Leutwiler	3	0	0+0	0	1+0	0	2+0	0
40	GK	(England) ENG	Joe Hilton	0	0	0+0	0	0+0	0	0+0	0
45	GK	(England) ENG	Jordan Eastham	0	0	0+0	0	0+0	0	0+0	0
2	DF	(Namibia) NAM	Ryan Nyambe	33	0	30+1	0	0+0	0	2+0	0
3	DF	(Republic of Ireland) IRL	Derrick Williams	19	3	17+0	3	0+1	0	1+0	0
14	DF	(Scotland) SCO	Charlie Mulgrew	2	0	2+0	0	0+0	0	0+0	0
17	DF	(England) ENG	Amari'i Bell	22	0	19+2	0	1+0	0	0+0	0
24	DF	(England) ENG	Tosin Adarabioyo (on loan from Manchester City)	35	3	33+1	3	1+0	0	0+0	0
26	DF	(Republic of Ireland) IRL	Darragh Lenihan	39	3	37+0	3	1+0	0	1+0	0
35	DF	(England) ENG	Joe Grayson	1	0	0+0	0	0+0	0	1+0	0
38	DF	(England) ENG	Tyler Magloire	0	0	0+0	0	0+0	0	0+0	0
41	DF	(England) ENG	Hayden Carter	2	0	2+0	0	0+0	0	0+0	0
4	MF	(England) ENG	Bradley Johnson	35	3	25+9	3	1+0	0	0+0	0
6	MF	(England) ENG	Richie Smallwood	2	0	0+0	0	0+0	0	2+0	0
8	MF	(England) ENG	Joe Rothwell	39	3	21+15	2	1+0	0	1+1	1
11	MF	(England) ENG	Harry Chapman	7	0	0+5	0	0+1	0	0+1	0
18	MF	(England) ENG	Jacob Davenport	9	0	0+9	0	0+0	0	0+0	0
19	MF	(England) ENG	Stewart Downing	43	3	38+3	2	1+0	0	1+0	1
22	MF	(Germany) GER	Lewis Holtby	27	3	16+11	3	0+0	0	0+0	0
23	MF	(England) ENG	Bradley Dack	24	10	22+0	9	0+0	0	1+1	1
27	MF	(England) ENG	Lewis Travis	44	2	41+2	2	0+0	0	0+1	0
29	MF	(Northern Ireland) NIR	Corry Evans	15	1	11+2	1	0+0	0	2+0	0
31	MF	(Jamaica) JAM	Elliott Bennett (C)	42	0	29+12	0	1+0	0	0+0	0
37	MF	(England) ENG	Joe Rankin-Costello	12	0	8+3	0	0+0	0	0+1	0
39	MF	(England) ENG	John Buckley	23	2	5+15	2	0+1	0	2+0	0
7	FW	(England) ENG	Adam Armstrong	48	17	40+6	16	1+0	1	1+0	0
9	FW	(England) ENG	Sam Gallagher	44	7	28+14	6	1+0	0	0+1	1
10	FW	(England) ENG	Danny Graham	39	4	14+24	4	0+0	0	1+0	0
12	FW	(England) ENG	Dominic Samuel	15	2	7+8	2	0+0	0	0+0	0
20	FW	(England) ENG	Ben Brereton	17	1	7+8	1	1+0	0	1+0	0
34	FW	(England) ENG	Daniel Butterworth	0	0	0+0	0	0+0	0	0+0	0
44	FW	(Wales) WAL	Jack Vale	1	0	0+1	0	0+0	0	0+0	0
Players out on loan:
30	DF	(England) ENG	Sam Hart (on loan at Shrewsbury Town)	0	0	0+0	0	0+0	0	0+0	0
33	GK	(England) ENG	Andrew Fisher (on loan at Milton Keynes Dons	0	0	0+0	0	0+0	0	0+0	0
36	DF	(England) ENG	Matthew Platt (on loan at Barrow)	1	0	0+0	0	0+0	0	1+0	0
	DF	(Northern Ireland) NIR	Lewis Thompson (on loan at AFC Fylde)	0	0	0+0	0	0+0	0	0+0	0
	DF	(England) ENG	Scott Wharton (on loan at Northampton Town)	0	0	0+0	0	0+0	0	0+0	0
	MF	(England) ENG	Tom White (on loan at Barrow)	0	0	0+0	0	0+0	0	0+0	0
Players that played for Blackburn Rovers this season that have left the club:
5	DF	(Republic of Ireland) IRL	Greg Cunningham (on loan from Cardiff City)	10	0	8+0	0	0+0	0	2+0	0

=== Goalscorers ===
As of 22 July 2020

Rank	No.	Pos.	Name	League	FA Cup	EFL Cup	Total
1	7	FW	(England) Adam Armstrong	16	1	0	17
2	23	MF	(England) Bradley Dack	9	0	1	10
3	9	FW	(England) Sam Gallagher	6	0	1	7
4	10	FW	(England) Danny Graham	4	0	0	4
5	3	DF	(Republic of Ireland) Derrick Williams	3	0	0	3
=	4	MF	(England) Bradley Johnson	3	0	0	3
=	8	MF	(England) Joe Rothwell	2	0	1	3
=	19	MF	(England) Stuart Downing	2	0	1	3
=	22	MF	(Germany) Lewis Holtby	3	0	0	3
=	24	DF	(England) Tosin Adarabioyo	3	0	0	3
=	26	DF	(Republic of Ireland) Darragh Lenihan	3	0	0	3
12	12	MF	(England) Dominic Samuel	2	0	0	2
=	27	MF	(England) Lewis Travis	2	0	0	2
=	39	MF	(England) John Buckley	2	0	0	2
15	20	FW	(England) Ben Brereton	1	0	0	1
=	29	MF	(Northern Ireland) Corry Evans	1	0	0	1
—	—	—	Own goal	4	0	0	4
Total				66	1	4	71

== Transfers ==
=== Summer ===
==== Transfers in ====
Date from	Position	Nationality	Name	From	Fee	Ref.	Other.
1 July 2019	LM	(England)	Stewart Downing	(England) Middlesbrough	Free transfer		
1 July 2019	GK	(England)	Joe Hilton	(England) Everton	Free transfer		Signed for Blackburn Rovers U23's
5 July 2019	CM	(England)	Bradley Johnson	(England) Derby County	Free Transfer		
9 July 2019	MF	(England)	Tom White	(England) Gateshead	Undisclosed		Signed for Blackburn Rovers U23's
13 July 2019	CF	(England)	Sam Gallagher	(England) Southampton	Undisclosed *(£5 million figure suggested)		
19 September 2019	AM	(Germany)	Lewis Holtby	(Germany) Hamburg	Free transfer		

Total outgoing: +/- ~£

==== Transfers out ====
Date from	Position	Nationality	Name	To	Fee	Ref.
30 June 2019	GK	(England)	Charlie Albinson	(England) Southport	Released	
30 June 2019	CF	(Scotland)	Kyle Connell	Free agent	Released	
30 June 2019	LM	(Scotland)	Craig Conway	(England) Salford City	Released	
30 June 2019	CB	(England)	Paul Downing	(England) Portsmouth	Released	
30 June 2019	LB	(England)	Jack Doyle	(England) Southport	Released	
30 June 2019	CF	(England)	Lewis Mansell	(Scotland) Partick Thistle	Released	
30 June 2019	CM	(England)	George Wilson	Free agent	Released	
30 June 2019	CB	(England)	Jack Rodwell	(England) Sheffield United	Released	
6 July 2019	GK	(Spain)	David Raya	(England) Brentford	Undisclosed *(£3 million figure suggested)	
1 August 2019	CF	(England)	Joe Nuttall	(England) Blackpool	Undisclosed	

==== Trial period with club ====
Date arrived	Position	Nationality	Name	Previous club	Contract status	Other	Ref.
June 2019	GK	(Scotland)	Joshua Rae	(England) Leeds United	Contract expired	Trial terminated July 2019	
July 2019	CM	(England)	Jacob Butterfield	(England) Derby County	Contract expires 30.06.2020 (*contract terminated by mutual consent)	Signed for (England) Luton Town on 30.07.2019	
July 2019	CM	(Scotland)	Charlie Adam	(England) Stoke City	Contract expired	Signed for (England) Reading on 22.07.2019	

Total incoming: +/- ~£ 0 *(£3 million figure suggested for Raya transfer)

==== Loans in ====
Date from	Position	Nationality	Name|	From	Length	Ref.
23 July 2019	GK	(England)	Christian Walton	(England) Brighton & Hove Albion	30 June 2020	
31 July 2019	CB	(England)	Tosin Adarabioyo	(England) Manchester City	30 June 2020	
8 August 2019	LB	(Republic of Ireland)	Greg Cunningham	(England) Cardiff City	30 June 2020 (recalled)	

==== Loans out ====
Date from	Position	Nationality	Name	To	Length	Ref.
26 July 2019	CB	(England)	Scott Wharton	(England) Northampton Town	30 June 2020	
8 August 2019	CB	(England)	Tyler Magloire	(England) Rochdale	30 June 2020 (Recalled)	
9 August 2019	CB	(Scotland)	Charlie Mulgrew	(England) Wigan Athletic	30 June 2020 (cut short 15 Jan')	
23 August 2019	GK	(England)	Andy Fisher	(England) Northampton Town	1 January 2020	
30 August 2019	CB	(England)	Matthew Platt	(England) Barrow	30 June 2020	
13 September 2019	RB	(England)	Andy Jackson	(England) Clitheroe	12 October 2019	
15 November 2019	CM	(England)	Tom White	(England) Barrow	18 January 2020 (Extended)	
3 December 2019	LB	(England)	Jack Evans	(England) Lancaster City	4 January 2020	

=== Winter ===
==== Transfers in ====
Date from	Position	Nationality	Name	From	Fee	Ref.

Total outgoing: +/- ~£

==== Transfers out ====
Date from	Position	Nationality	Name	To	Fee	Ref.
2 January 2020	CM	(England)	Ben Gladwin	Milton Keynes Dons	Released	
2 January 2020	RB	(England)	Andy Jackson	Free agent	Released	

Total incoming: +/- ~£ 0

==== Loans in ====
Date from	Position	Nationality	Name	From	Length	Ref.
1 February 2020	RW	(England)	D'Margio Wright-Phillips	(England) Manchester City	30 June 2020	

==== Loans out ====
Date from	Position	Nationality	Name	To	Length	Ref.
17 January 2020	LB	(England)	Sam Hart	(England) Shrewsbury Town	30 June 2020	
31 January 2020	GK	(England)	Andy Fisher	(England) Milton Keynes Dons	30 June 2020	
5 March 2020	CF	(Wales)	Jack Vale	(England) Barrow	30 June 2020	
5 March 2020	LB	(England)	Lewis Thompson	(England) AFC Fylde	30 June 2020	
