= Harvey Elliott =

English footballer (born 2003)

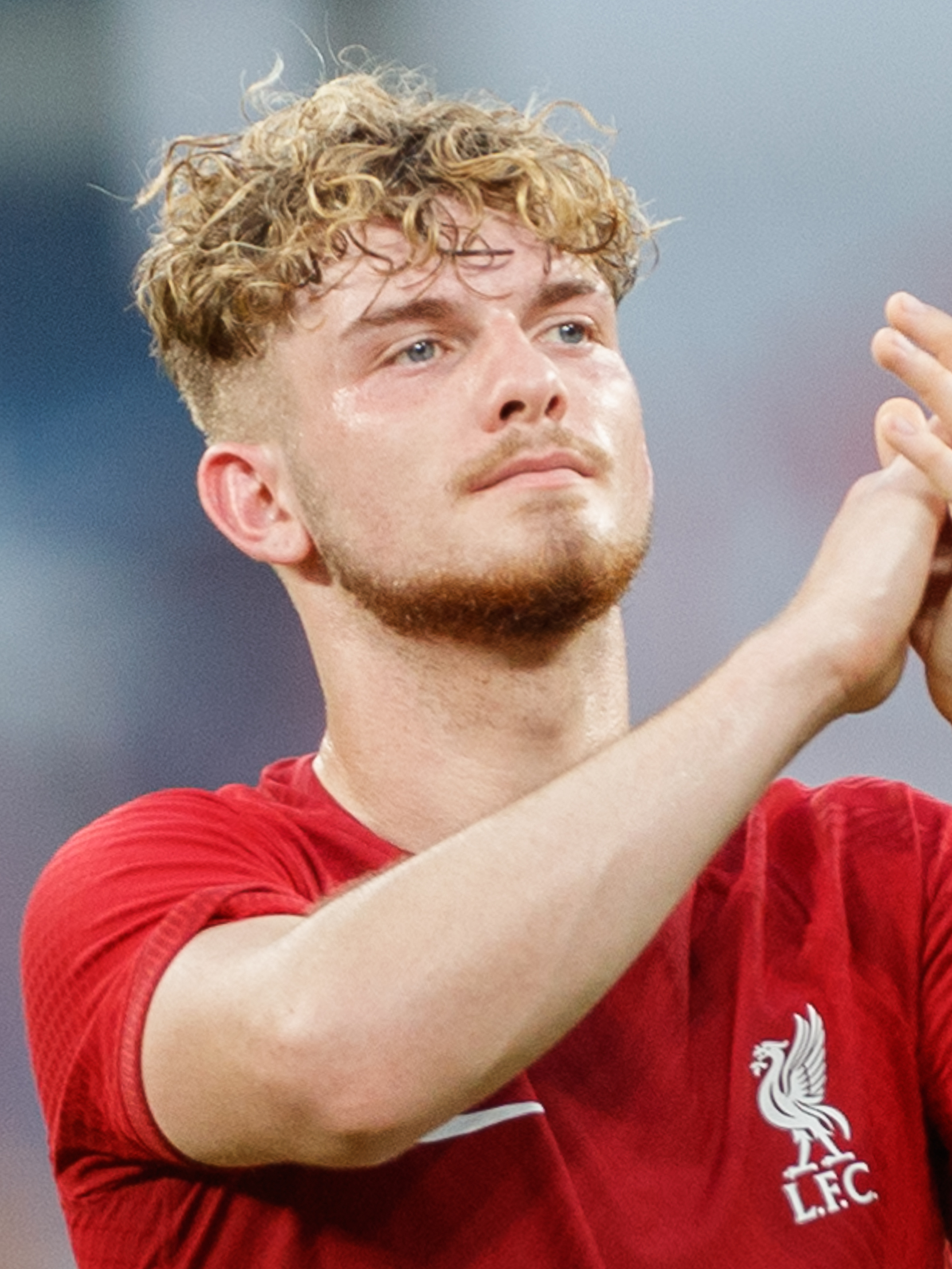
- Elliott playing for Liverpool in 2022

Personal information
- Full name: Harvey Daniel James Elliott
- Date of birth: 4 April 2003 (age 23)
- Place of birth: Chertsey, Surrey, England
- Height: 5 ft 7 in (1.70 m)
- Position: Attacking midfielder

Team information
- Current team: Valencia (on loan from Liverpool)
- Number: 10

Youth career
- Queens Park Rangers
- –2018: Fulham

Senior career*
| Years | Team | Apps | (Gls) |
| 2018–2019 | Fulham | 2 | (0) |
| 2019– | Liverpool | 93 | (5) |
| 2020–2021 | → Blackburn Rovers (loan) | 41 | (7) |
| 2025–2026 | → Aston Villa (loan) | 4 | (0) |
| 2026– | → Valencia (loan) | 6 | (0) |

International career^{‡}
| 2018 | England U16 | 1 | (0) |
| 2018–2019 | England U17 | 11 | (3) |
| 2022–2025 | England U21 | 28 | (14) |
Medal record
Men's football
Representing England
UEFA European Under-21 Championship
| Winner | 2023 |
| Winner | 2025 |
- * Club domestic league appearances and goals as of 21:15, 24 October 2026 (UTC) ‡ National team caps and goals as of 21:18, 28 June 2025 (UTC)

Harvey Daniel James Elliott (born 4 April 2003) is an English professional footballer who plays as an attacking midfielder for La Liga club Valencia, on loan from Premier League club Liverpool.

Having come up through Fulham's academy, Elliott made his first-team debut in September 2018, becoming the youngest player to play in the EFL Cup, aged 15 years and 174 days.

== Early life ==
Elliott was born on 4 April 2003 in Chertsey, Surrey. He was interested in football from a young age and grew up supporting Liverpool. His father, Scott, would tutor him so he could develop a professional attitude towards training. Elliott joined Queens Park Rangers' youth academy at an early age, after having been turned down by Chelsea for being "too small".

== Club career ==
=== Fulham ===
Elliott was signed by Fulham's academy at under-18 level. He made his first-team debut for Fulham on 25 September 2018 as a 15-year-old in the EFL Cup third round away to Millwall, as an 81st-minute substitute for Floyd Ayité in a 3–1 win. He had been at Coombe Boys' School in New Malden, Greater London earlier that day and was back at school the next morning. At 15 years and 174 days old, he became the club's youngest ever first-team player and the youngest to ever play in the competition.

On 4 May 2019, Elliott made his Premier League debut, coming on as a 88th-minute substitute for Frank Anguissa in a 1–0 away defeat to Wolverhampton Wanderers. In doing so, he became the youngest ever Premier League player at the time, at 16 years and 30 days old, beating the then-record set in 2007 by fellow Fulham player Matthew Briggs. Elliott held the record until 18 September 2022, when it was broken by Arsenal player Ethan Nwaneri.

=== Liverpool ===
==== 2019–20 season ====
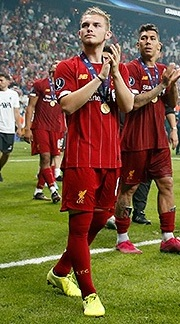
Elliott after winning the 2019 UEFA Super Cup with Liverpool

Elliott signed for Premier League club Liverpool on 28 July 2019 for an undisclosed fee. He made his debut for the club on 25 September in that season's EFL Cup match against Milton Keynes Dons. At the age of 16 years and 174 days, he became the youngest-ever player to start a match for the club, and second-youngest to feature in a competitive fixture behind Jerome Sinclair. The following month, during the team's 5–4 penalty shoot-out (after a 5–5 draw after extra time) win over Arsenal in the next round of the competition, Elliott became the youngest player to start a match at Liverpool's home ground, Anfield, at the age of 16 years and 209 days. In October 2019, Elliott was subject to a 14 day suspension after social media footage emerged of him mocking Tottenham Hotspur player Harry Kane, using terms used to mock disabled people; he was also fined, and had to undergo sensitivity training. He made his Premier League debut for Liverpool on 2 January 2020, replacing Mohamed Salah one minute before the final whistle in a 2–0 home win against Sheffield United.

Elliott signed his first professional contract with Liverpool on 6 July 2020. On 10 February 2021, the independent Professional Football Compensation Committee ordered Liverpool to compensate Fulham an undisclosed amount for Elliott's transfer. Liverpool confirmed the fee as £1.5 million, plus £2.8 million in bonuses. The fee was a record for a then-16 year old.

==== 2020–21 season: Loan to Blackburn Rovers ====
In October 2020, Elliott joined Championship club Blackburn Rovers on a season-long loan. He made his league debut for Blackburn in their 3–1 away loss to Watford on 21 October. He scored his first goal for the club in their 4–0 away win against Coventry City on 24 October.

In April 2021, Elliott was nominated for the EFL Young Player of the Season award, which was eventually won by Reading player Michael Olise. He finished the 2020–21 season with 7 goals and 11 assists. He also was awarded Blackburn's Goal of the Season for his strike against Millwall in December 2020. He returned to Liverpool after the Championship season ended in May 2021.

==== 2021–22 season ====
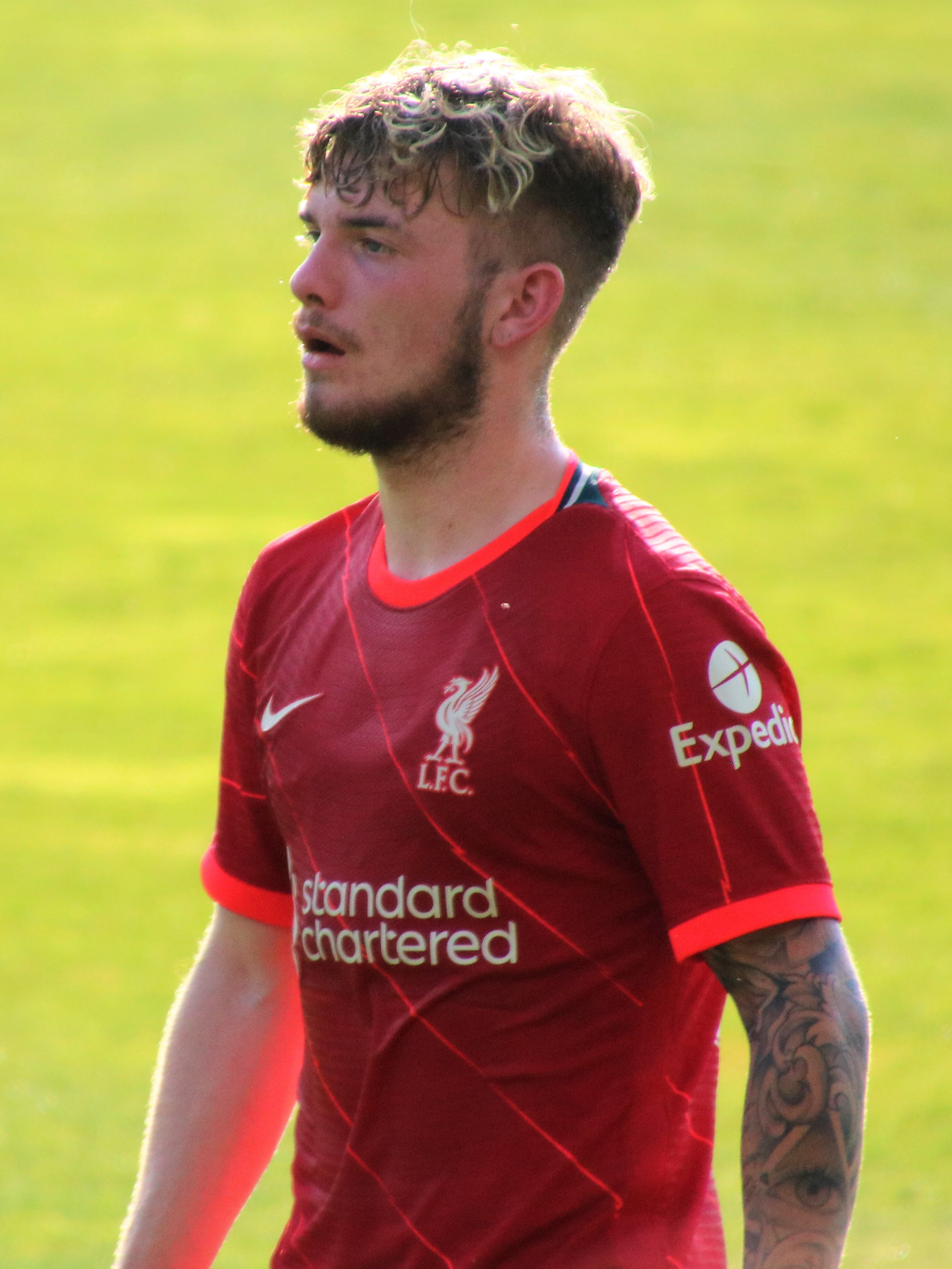
Elliott playing for Liverpool in 2021

Elliott signed a new long-term contract with Liverpool on 9 July 2021. He made his full Premier League debut for Liverpool on 21 August, starting and playing the whole match in a 2–0 win against Burnley.

On 12 September 2021, Elliott dislocated his ankle in a challenge with Leeds United defender Pascal Struijk in a 3–0 away league win. Following the injury, Liverpool confirmed that he would require surgery. On 14 September, Elliott underwent successful surgery in London, with the club remaining hopeful that he would make a return before the end of the 2021–22 season.

Elliott returned to the Liverpool squad on 6 February 2022 in a fourth round FA Cup match against Cardiff City, coming on as a substitute in the 58th minute and scoring his first Liverpool goal in a 3–1 Liverpool victory. On 16 February, he made his UEFA Champions League debut, being named in the starting line-up for a round of 16 tie against Italian giants Inter Milan. He played 60 minutes before being replaced by Naby Keïta.

Elliott came on in the 79th minute of the 2022 EFL Cup final for captain Jordan Henderson and played the remaining minutes of the game, including the entirety of extra time. The game finished 0–0 and Elliott scored the 9th penalty for his side in the resulting shootout, which they won 11–10, to lift their first EFL Cup in 10 years. Liverpool narrowly missed out on the chance to achieve a historic quadruple, coming second in the 2021–22 Premier League and the Champions League but winning both the EFL Cup and the FA Cup.

==== 2022–2025 ====
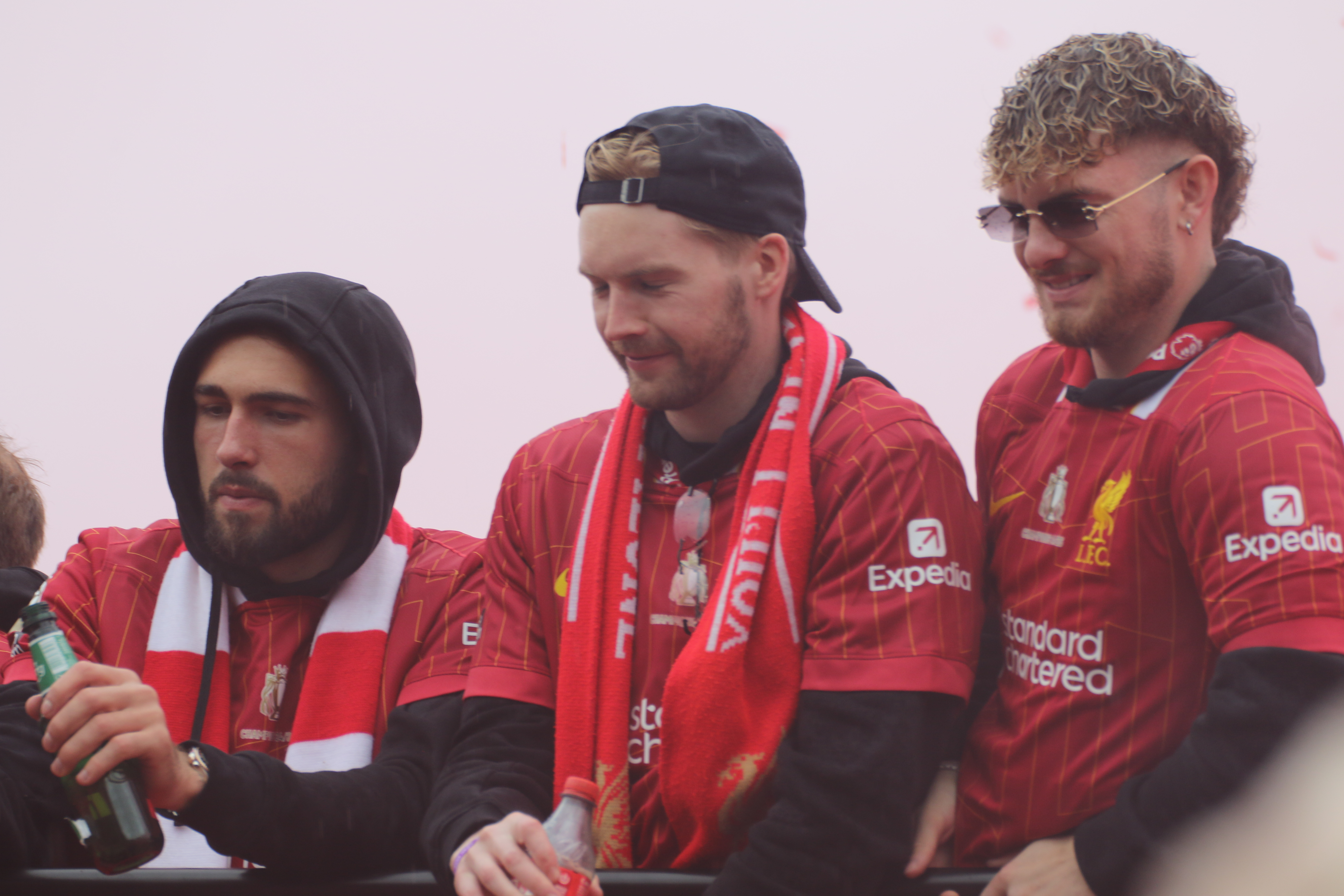
Elliott (far right) celebrating Liverpool's 2025 Premier League title

On 27 August 2022, Elliott scored his first Premier League goal for Liverpool in a 9–0 win against AFC Bournemouth. He became a regular in the first-team, deputising for Jordan Henderson in the captain's absence, and won plaudits for his "exceptional" performance in a 2–1 win against Newcastle United.

On 12 October 2022, Elliott scored his first Champions League goal when he scored the rebound from Diogo Jota's deflected effort in a 7–1 win against Rangers. He then scored his second Champions League goal just two weeks later, notching the third in a 3–0 away win over Ajax at the Johan Cruyff Arena to help Liverpool qualify for the knockout stage. At the end of the 2022–23 season, Liverpool narrowly missed out on Champions League qualification.

Elliott became a first-team regular for Liverpool in the 2023–24 season. He helped the club win the EFL Cup in that season.

On 5 March 2025, Elliott came on for Mohamed Salah in the 86th minute and scored the winning goal just 47 seconds after coming off the bench against Paris Saint-Germain in the UEFA Champions League. Although the team were eliminated in the return leg at Anfield, Elliott won his first Premier League title with Liverpool a month later.

==== Loan to Aston Villa ====
On 1 September 2025, Elliott signed for fellow Premier League club Aston Villa on an initial season-long loan with an obligation to buy conditional to appearances. It was reported that the agreed permanent transfer would cost £35 million, including sell-on and buy-back clauses. On 13 September, the 22-year-old made his debut as a 71st minute substitute for Emiliano Buendía in a 0–0 draw at Everton in the Premier League. Three days later, he made his first start for Aston Villa, scoring the opening goal in an EFL Cup third round tie away to Brentford which ended in a penalty shootout defeat. However, Elliott's appearances were limited by a clause in the loan agreement that would trigger Aston Villa's obligation to buy after he made ten appearances. Manager Unai Emery acknowledged that the situation was affecting the player's development.

==== Loan to Valencia ====
On 1 September 2026, Elliott moved to Spain, signing for La Liga club Valencia on a season-long loan. On 6 September, he made his official debut in a 0–5 defeat to Barcelona at the Mestalla Stadium.

== International career ==
Elliott received his first call-up to the England under-17 team in October 2018. The following month he scored his first goal at this age level, away to the Republic of Ireland.

Elliott was included in the England under-17 squad for the 2019 Syrenka Cup, a friendly tournament usually held in preparation for UEFA European Under-17 Championship qualifying. Elliott helped the England under-17 team to the title on 10 September 2019 by scoring the opening goal of the final from the spot in a 2–2 draw with hosts Poland before Kevin Betsy's Young Lions won 3–1 after a penalty shoot-out.

Elliott made his debut for the under-21 team on 25 March 2022 in a 4–1 win over Andorra at Dean Court in 2023 U21 EURO qualifying.

On 14 June 2023, Elliott was included in the England squad for the 2023 UEFA European Under-21 Championship; a tournament the Young Lions ultimately went on to win.

In June 2025, Elliott was included in the England squad for 2025 UEFA European Under-21 Championship, scoring England's first goal of the tournament in their opening match, a 3–1 win against the Czech Republic. He scored both England goals in their 2–1 semi-final victory against the Netherlands as the team reached the final. On 28 June 2025, Elliott played in the 2025 UEFA European Under-21 Championship final, scoring England's opening goal against Germany in a 3–2 victory. Elliott was named Player of the Tournament, having scored five goals in the tournament.

== Personal life ==
Elliott is a lifelong fan of Liverpool and attended the 2018 Champions League final in Kyiv with his father, Scott. He is also a fan of the NBA, supporting the Boston Celtics, and has attended several of their games.

Eliott is a close friend of former teammate and current Brentford player Fábio Carvalho, having attended the same school and come through the Fulham academy together, later advising him to join Liverpool. He also considers Mohamed Salah to be a friend and mentor, with the Egyptian forward guiding him during the 2021–22 season and advising him on his diet and exercise regimen.

== Career statistics ==
As of match played 10 November 2026

Appearances and goals by club, season and competition
| Club | Season | League | | | National cup (Note: Includes FA Cup, Copa del Rey) | | EFL Cup | | Europe | | Other | | Total | |
| Club | Season | Division | Apps | Goals | Apps | Goals | Apps | Goals | Apps | Goals | Apps | Goals | Apps | Goals |
|---|---|---|---|---|---|---|---|---|---|---|---|---|---|---|
| Fulham U21 | 2018–19 | — | | | — | | — | | — | | 1 (Note: Appearance in EFL Trophy) | 0 | 1 | 0 |
| Fulham | 2018–19 | Premier League | 2 | 0 | 0 | 0 | 1 | 0 | — | | — | | 3 | 0 |
| Liverpool U21 | 2019–20 | — | | | — | | — | | — | | 1 | 1 | 1 | 1 |
| Liverpool | 2019–20 | Premier League | 2 | 0 | 3 | 0 | 3 | 0 | 0 | 0 | 0 | 0 | 8 | 0 |
| Liverpool | 2020–21 | Premier League | 0 | 0 | — | | 1 | 0 | — | | 0 | 0 | 1 | 0 |
| Liverpool | 2021–22 | Premier League | 6 | 0 | 3 | 1 | 1 | 0 | 1 (Note: Appearance(s) in UEFA Champions League) | 0 | — | | 11 | 1 |
| Liverpool | 2022–23 | Premier League | 32 | 1 | 3 | 2 | 2 | 0 | 8 | 2 | 1 (Note: Appearance in FA Community Shield) | 0 | 46 | 5 |
| Liverpool | 2023–24 | Premier League | 34 | 3 | 3 | 1 | 6 | 0 | 10 (Note: Appearances in UEFA Europa League) | 0 | — | | 53 | 4 |
| Liverpool | 2024–25 | Premier League | 18 | 1 | 2 | 0 | 3 | 1 | 5 | 3 | — | | 28 | 5 |
| Liverpool | 2025–26 | Premier League | 1 | 0 | — | | — | | — | | 1 | 0 | 2 | 0 |
| Liverpool | Total | | 93 | 5 | 14 | 4 | 16 | 1 | 24 | 5 | 2 | 0 | 149 | 15 |
| Blackburn Rovers (loan) | 2020–21 | Championship | 41 | 7 | 1 | 0 | — | | — | | — | | 42 | 7 |
| Aston Villa (loan) | 2025–26 | Premier League | 4 | 0 | 0 | 0 | 1 | 1 | 4 | 0 | — | | 9 | 1 |
| Valencia (loan) | 2026–27 | La Liga | 6 | 0 | 1 | 1 | — | | — | | — | | 7 | 1 |
| Career total | | | 146 | 12 | 16 | 5 | 18 | 2 | 28 | 5 | 4 | 1 | 212 | 25 |

== Honours ==
Liverpool

- Premier League: 2024–25
- EFL Cup: 2021–22, 2023–24; runner-up: 2024–25
- FA Community Shield: 2022
- UEFA Super Cup: 2019
- FIFA Club World Cup: 2019
- UEFA Champions League runner-up: 2021–22

Aston Villa

- UEFA Europa League: 2025–26

England U21

- UEFA European Under-21 Championship: 2023, 2025

Individual

- Blackburn Rovers Goal of the Season: 2020–21
- UEFA European Under-21 Championship Player of the Tournament: 2025
- UEFA European Under-21 Championship Team of the Tournament: 2025
