= Joe Rankin-Costello =

English footballer (born 1999)

Personal information
- Full name: Joseph Scott Rankin-Costello
- Date of birth: 26 July 1999 (age 27)
- Place of birth: Stockport, England
- Height: 1.83 m (6 ft 0 in)
- Positions: Defender; midfielder

Team information
- Current team: Charlton Athletic
- Number: 26

Youth career
- –2014: Manchester United
- 2014–2017: Blackburn Rovers

Senior career*
Years	Team	Apps	(Gls)
2017–2025	Blackburn Rovers	115	(6)
2025–	Charlton Athletic	34	(2)
- * Club domestic league appearances and goals as of 17:10, 21 November 2026 (UTC)

Joseph Scott Rankin-Costello (born 26 July 1999) is an English professional footballer who plays for EFL Championship club Charlton Athletic as a defender and midfielder.

== Career ==
=== Blackburn Rovers ===
Rankin-Costello started his career with Manchester United academy before moving to the Blackburn Rovers academy in 2014. He cemented his position in the U18 and U23 teams and was also a part of the squad which reached the semi-finals of the FA Youth Cup. In the 2016–17 season, he made 36 appearances for the junior teams of the club. In January 2017, as a 17-year-old, he signed a professional contract with the first team, penning a deal which would keep him at the club until the summer of 2019.

On 4 October 2017, he made his senior debut against Bury where he came as a 57th-minute substitute for Harrison Chapman. On 29 August 2020, Rankin-Costello scored his first professional goal in an EFL Cup tie against Doncaster Rovers. Rankin-Costello continued to make first team appearances in the league, playing on both sides of the pitch as a full back.

=== Charlton Athletic ===
On 11 July 2025, Rankin-Costello joined EFL Championship side Charlton Athletic on a four-year deal. He scored his first goal for Charlton in a 1–1 draw against league leaders Coventry City on 1 January 2026 at The Valley.

== Career statistics ==
As of match played 21 November 2026

Appearances and goals by club, season and competition
Club	Season	League			FA Cup		League Cup		Other		Total	
Club	Season	Division	Apps	Goals	Apps	Goals	Apps	Goals	Apps	Goals	Apps	Goals
Blackburn Rovers U23	2016–17	—	—		—		—		1 (Note: Appearance in EFL Trophy)	0	1	0
Blackburn Rovers	2017–18	League One	0	0	0	0	0	0	1	0	1	0
Blackburn Rovers	2018–19	Championship	0	0	0	0	0	0	—		0	0
Blackburn Rovers	2019–20	Championship	11	0	0	0	1	0	—		12	0
Blackburn Rovers	2020–21	Championship	14	0	0	0	2	1	—		16	1
Blackburn Rovers	2021–22	Championship	10	0	0	0	0	0	—		10	0
Blackburn Rovers	2022–23	Championship	24	2	5	1	3	0	—		32	3
Blackburn Rovers	2023–24	Championship	27	2	1	0	1	0	—		29	2
Blackburn Rovers	2024–25	Championship	29	2	2	0	1	0	—		32	2
Blackburn Rovers	Blackburn Rovers total		115	6	8	1	8	1	1	0	132	8
Charlton Athletic	2025–26	Championship	23	2	1	0	2	0	—		26	2
Charlton Athletic	2026–27	Championship	11	0	0	0	1	0	—		12	0
Charlton Athletic	Charlton Athletic total		34	2	1	0	3	0	0	0	38	2
Career total			149	8	9	1	11	1	2	0	171	10
