= Jacob Davenport =

English footballer (born 1998)

Personal information
- Full name: Jacob Alexander Davenport
- Date of birth: 28 December 1998 (age 27)
- Height: 5 ft 10 in (1.77 m)
- Position: Midfielder

Team information
- Current team: Derry City
- Number: 19

Youth career
- Manchester City

Senior career*
Years	Team	Apps	(Gls)
2017–2018	Manchester City	0	(0)
2018	→ Burton Albion (loan)	17	(1)
2018–2022	Blackburn Rovers	34	(1)
2022–2023	Lincoln City	0	(0)
2023	Stockport County	7	(0)
2023–2024	Morecambe	26	(1)
2024–	Derry City	7	(0)
- * Club domestic league appearances and goals as of 18:07, 13 November 2024 (UTC)

Jacob Alexander Davenport (born 28 December 1998) is an English professional footballer who plays as a midfielder for League of Ireland Premier Division club Derry City.

Davenport began his career with the youth team of Manchester City, making his professional debut on loan at Burton Albion. He later played with Blackburn Rovers, Lincoln City, Stockport County and Morecambe.

== Career ==
Davenport moved on loan from Manchester City to Burton Albion in January 2018. He made his senior debut on 3 February 2018, and scored his first senior goal on 20 February 2018.

On 2 July 2018, Davenport signed for Blackburn Rovers on a four-year contract. His first two seasons were marred by injury, but he began playing towards the end of the 2019–20 season. He scored his first goal for Blackburn on 5 December 2020, a late equaliser in a 2–2 draw at Brentford.

On 20 May 2022, Blackburn announced Davenport would be departing the club upon the expiration of his contract on 30 June, with the club opting against offering the player a new deal. Davenport had a trial spell with Scottish club Hearts in August 2022, but they decided not to offer him a contract.

On 13 September 2022, Davenport joined Lincoln City on a short-term contract until January 2023. He made his debut in the EFL Trophy against Doncaster Rovers on 20 September 2022. He left the club on the 13 January 2023 following the expiration of his contract.

On 20 February 2023, Davenport joined Stockport County on a short term deal until the end of the season.

On 20 July 2023, Davenport signed for Morecambe on a one-year contract.

On 22 June 2024, it was announced that Davenport had signed for Derry City on a permanent basis.

== Career statistics ==
As of match played on 10 November 2024

Appearances and goals by club, season and competition
Club	Season	League			National Cup		League Cup		Other		Total	
Club	Season	Division	Apps	Goals	Apps	Goals	Apps	Goals	Apps	Goals	Apps	Goals
Manchester City	2017–18	Premier League	0	0	0	0	0	0	0	0	0	0
Burton Albion (loan)	2017–18	Championship	17	1	0	0	0	0	–		17	1
Blackburn Rovers	2018–19	Championship	1	0	0	0	0	0	–		1	0
Blackburn Rovers	2019–20	Championship	9	0	0	0	0	0	–		9	0
Blackburn Rovers	2020–21	Championship	15	1	1	0	0	0	–		16	1
Blackburn Rovers	2021–22	Championship	9	0	0	0	1	0	–		10	0
Blackburn Rovers	Total		34	1	1	0	1	0	0	0	36	1
Lincoln City	2022–23	League One	0	0	0	0	1	0	2 (Note: Appearance(s) in the EFL Trophy)	0	3	0
Stockport County	2022–23	League Two	7	0	0	0	0	0	0	0	7	0
Morecambe	2023–24	League Two	26	1	0	0	1	0	2	0	29	1
Derry City	2024	LOI Premier Division	7	0	3	0	–		–		10	0
Derry City	2025	LOI Premier Division	0	0	0	0	–		–		0	0
Derry City	Total		7	0	3	0	–		–		10	0
Career total			91	3	4	0	3	0	4	0	102	3
