= Adam Armstrong (footballer) =

English footballer (born 1997)

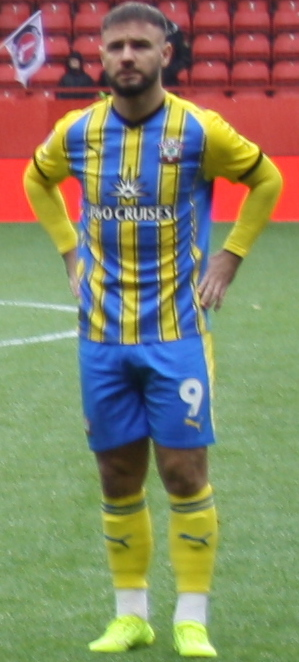
- Armstrong with Southampton in 2025

Personal information
- Full name: Adam James Armstrong
- Date of birth: 10 February 1997 (age 29)
- Place of birth: Newcastle upon Tyne, England
- Height: 5 ft 8 in (1.72 m)
- Position: Striker

Team information
- Current team: Wolverhampton Wanderers
- Number: 10

Youth career
- 2006–2014: Newcastle United

Senior career*
Years	Team	Apps	(Gls)
2014–2018	Newcastle United	17	(0)
2015–2016	→ Coventry City (loan)	40	(20)
2016–2017	→ Barnsley (loan)	34	(6)
2017	→ Bolton Wanderers (loan)	20	(1)
2018	→ Blackburn Rovers (loan)	21	(9)
2018–2021	Blackburn Rovers	130	(49)
2021–2026	Southampton	148	(38)
2025	→ West Bromwich Albion (loan)	16	(3)
2026–	Wolverhampton Wanderers	27	(6)

International career
2012–2013	England U16	6	(2)
2013–2014	England U17	12	(10)
2014–2015	England U18	9	(8)
2015–2016	England U19	9	(3)
2016–2017	England U20	13	(7)
2018	England U21	5	(1)
- * Club domestic league appearances and goals as of 06:01, 12 November 2026 (UTC)

Adam James Armstrong (born 10 February 1997) is an English professional footballer who plays as a striker for EFL Championship club Wolverhampton Wanderers.

Armstrong is a product of the Newcastle United academy and made his professional debut for the club in March 2014. He had loan spells with Coventry City, Barnsley, Bolton Wanderers and Blackburn Rovers before joining Rovers permanently in 2018. Armstrong moved to Southampton in August 2021 and spent the latter part of the 2024–25 season on loan at West Bromwich Albion. In February 2026, he joined Wolverhampton Wanderers. Armstrong has represented his country at youth levels.

== Club career ==
=== Newcastle United ===
A lifelong Newcastle fan, Armstrong joined the club at the age of nine and progressed through the ranks, scoring five times in his first five Professional Development League matches.

Armstrong was named among Newcastle's substitutes for the first time on 28 January 2014 for a Premier League game against Norwich City, remaining unused in the goalless draw at Carrow Road. On 15 March, Armstrong made his debut as an 86th-minute substitute for Luuk de Jong in a league defeat to Fulham, making him the second youngest player to play for Newcastle in the Premier League after Kazenga LuaLua.

On 24 September 2014, Armstrong started his first game for Newcastle in a League Cup third round match against Crystal Palace. Newcastle won the match 3–2 in extra time with Armstrong providing assists for two of Newcastle's goals. Armstrong received his first Premier League start on 26 December in a 3–1 loss to Manchester United at Old Trafford.

==== Coventry City (loan) ====
On 28 July 2015, Armstrong joined Coventry City on a youth loan until 16 January 2016. He made his debut on 8 August, scoring both goals in a 2–0 win over Wigan Athletic at the Ricoh Arena in the first game of the new League One season. A week later, he netted another brace in a 4–0 victory away to Millwall, the first goal coming from 35 yards out. Former Coventry and Newcastle legend Micky Quinn challenged him to beat his record of ten goals in his first six games in 1992 following his own move from the North East to the West Midlands. After scoring again in his next match on 18 August in a 3–2 win against Crewe Alexandra, Armstrong won the League One Player of the Month award for August with five goals in his first five games.

On 19 September, Armstrong scored a sixth goal to give Coventry victory against Chesterfield, and on 3 October he netted a third brace of the campaign in a 3–0 win over Shrewsbury Town. He recorded consecutive braces on 31 October and 3 November, in home victories over Peterborough United and Barnsley, the former seeing his team come from 1–2 behind with ten minutes to go. Armstrong scored a first senior hat-trick on 2 January 2016, in a 5–0 win at Crewe Alexandra.

On 14 January 2016, Armstrong's loan was extended until the end of the season. He finished the season scoring 20 goals in his 40 Coventry appearances. In April, he was listed in the PFA Team of the Year for League One.

==== Barnsley (loan) ====
Despite making two appearances for Newcastle at the start of the 2016–17 season, on 30 August, Armstrong joined fellow Championship side Barnsley on an initial six-month loan deal, having signed a new four-year deal at St James' Park before his departure, after Newcastle manager Rafael Benítez expressed his desire for Armstrong to gain more experience at Championship level. He made his debut for the Tykes on 10 September as a substitute in place of Ryan Kent during a 2–1 victory at Preston North End, scoring the winning goal with a left-footed curling effort after outpacing and losing his marker with a backheel. In January 2017, it was announced that Armstrong had extended his loan spell at the club until the end of the 2016–17 season.

==== Bolton Wanderers (loan) ====
On 17 July 2017, Armstrong joined Championship side Bolton Wanderers until the following January. He made his debut for the club on 6 August, coming on as a late substitute for Stephen Darby in Bolton's 3–2 home defeat to Leeds United before making his first start in the EFL Cup at Crewe Alexandra, scoring in a 2–1 win. Armstrong was recalled from his loan spell on 4 January 2018, having made 23 appearances in all competitions.

=== Blackburn Rovers ===
On 9 January 2018, Armstrong joined EFL League One side Blackburn Rovers on loan until the end of the season. He helped Blackburn secure promotion to the EFL Championship at the first time of asking.

Armstrong signed for Blackburn Rovers permanently on 6 August 2018 on a four-year contract for an undisclosed fee believed to be in the region of £1.75 million. Throughout the 2020–21 season, he scored three hat-tricks, coming against Wycombe Wanderers, Huddersfield Town and Birmingham City.

Armstrong scored 64 league and cup goals in his 160 appearances for Rovers, including 29 goals in his final season with them.

=== Southampton ===
On 10 August 2021, Armstrong joined Premier League side Southampton on a four-year deal for an undisclosed fee, reported to be in the region of £15 million. He scored on his debut for the club, a 3–1 defeat away to Everton on the opening day of the Premier League season. On 5 November 2021, Armstrong scored his second goal of the season in a 1–0 victory against Aston Villa. Armstrong would not score again in his eight starts during the rest of the 2021–22 season.

On 6 August 2022, he made his first appearance of the 2022–23 season in a 4–1 defeat to Tottenham Hotspur. On 30 August 2022, Armstrong scored his first league goal of the season in a 2–1 win against Chelsea. Armstrong ended his goal drought and scored on 7 January 2023 in a 2–1 victory against Crystal Palace in the FA Cup. In the final game of the 2022–23 season, he scored in a 4–4 draw against Liverpool.

Following Southampton's relegation from the Premier League, Armstrong scored in the opening game of the 2023–24 season in a 2–1 away victory against Sheffield Wednesday after a left-footed shot from Nathan Tella flicked off of his head. A week later, Armstrong scored two penalties in a 4–4 draw against Norwich City. On 17 May 2024, he scored twice in a 3–1 victory against West Bromwich Albion in the second leg of the EFL Championship play-off semi-final, securing his team's place in the final. Later that month, on 26 May, he netted the decisive goal in a 1–0 victory over Leeds United in the final, ensuring his club's promotion to the Premier League.

On 19 July 2024, Armstrong signed a three-year contract extension. His first league goal of the 2024–25 season, a 1–0 home victory against Everton on 2 November 2024, was also Saints' first win following promotion from the Championship and lifted the club off the bottom of the Premier League.

==== West Bromwich Albion (loan) ====
On 4 February 2025, Armstrong joined Championship side West Bromwich Albion on loan for the remainder of the 2024–25 season. He scored on his debut for the club on 8 February 2025 in a 2–1 victory against Sheffield Wednesday.

=== Wolverhampton Wanderers ===
On 2 February 2026, Armstrong joined Wolverhampton Wanderers on a three-and-a-half-year contract.

== International career ==
Armstrong has represented England at under-16 and under-17 levels. He made his debut for the under-16 side on 27 September 2012, in a 5–0 win against Northern Ireland in the Victory Shield, as England retained the tournament title for the twelfth year in a row following wins against Wales, and Scotland. He scored his first goal on 13 February 2013, in a friendly against Germany after replacing Izzy Brown in the second half. He was named in the England squad to take part in the 2013 Montaigu Tournament in France, with England drawn against Germany, Netherlands and Chile. England began the tournament with a 1–1 draw against the Netherlands, and beat Chile 3–1 in the second game with goals from Patrick Roberts and Giorgio Rasulo. A 1–1 draw with Germany in the final game meant that England finished as group winners and faced Turkey in the final. Armstrong scored in the final which England lost on penalties after the game had finished 2–2.

This was to be his last appearance for the under-16 team, as he moved up to the under-17 side, scoring on his debut in a 1–0 win against Turkey in the FA International Tournament held at St George's Park National Football Centre in Burton upon Trent. He was named in the squad for the 2014 UEFA European Under-17 Championship qualifying round matches against Armenia, Gibraltar and Republic of Ireland, scoring twice in each of the three games, as England won the group scoring 18 goals without conceding a single goal. England were subsequently drawn against group hosts Czech Republic, Albania and Italy in the elite round. Armstrong played in the first two games, both 1–0 wins against the Czech Republic and Albania. The results left England needing only a draw against Italy in the final game to qualify for the tournament, and Armstrong opened the scoring as England won 2–1 and sealed qualification to the final tournament, held in Malta. Armstrong was called up to England's victorious 2014 UEFA European Under-17 Championship squad and scored twice during the competition before missing the final through injury.

On 26 August 2014, Armstrong received his first call-up to the under-18 team. He marked his debut with two goals in a friendly match against the Netherlands on 3 September. He followed this up with goals in victories against Poland and Switzerland to take his tally to four goals in his first four caps. In the second game against the Swiss, Armstrong scored twice as England won 6–1.

On 8 October 2015, Armstrong netted for England's under-19 team away to Macedonia. On 9 November 2016, now playing at U20 level, Armstrong scored a hat trick against Nigeria in South Korea.

=== 2017 FIFA U-20 World Cup ===
Armstrong was selected for the England under-20 team in the 2017 FIFA U-20 World Cup. He made four appearances in the tournament, scoring a goal in the opening game against Argentina. He was an unused substitute in the final between England and Venezuela that England won 1–0, England's first win in a global tournament since their World Cup victory of 1966.

== Career statistics ==
As of match played 7 November 2026

Appearances and goals by club, season and competition
Club	Season	League			FA Cup		League Cup		Other		Total	
Club	Season	Division	Apps	Goals	Apps	Goals	Apps	Goals	Apps	Goals	Apps	Goals
Newcastle United	2013–14	Premier League	4	0	0	0	0	0	—		4	0
Newcastle United	2014–15	Premier League	11	0	1	0	3	0	—		15	0
Newcastle United	2015–16	Premier League	0	0	—		—		—		0	0
Newcastle United	2016–17	Championship	2	0	—		0	0	—		2	0
Newcastle United	2017–18	Premier League	0	0	0	0	—		—		0	0
Newcastle United	Total		17	0	1	0	3	0	—		21	0
Coventry City (loan)	2015–16	League One	40	20	0	0	0	0	0	0	40	20
Barnsley (loan)	2016–17	Championship	34	6	1	0	—		—		35	6
Bolton Wanderers (loan)	2017–18	Championship	20	1	0	0	3	2	—		23	3
Blackburn Rovers (loan)	2017–18	League One	21	9	—		—		—		21	9
Blackburn Rovers	2018–19	Championship	44	5	2	1	2	3	—		48	9
Blackburn Rovers	2019–20	Championship	46	16	1	1	1	0	—		48	17
Blackburn Rovers	2020–21	Championship	40	28	1	0	2	1	—		43	29
Blackburn Rovers	Blackburn total		151	58	4	2	5	4	—		160	64
Southampton	2021–22	Premier League	23	2	4	0	1	0	—		28	2
Southampton	2022–23	Premier League	30	2	3	1	6	0	—		39	3
Southampton	2023–24	Championship	46	21	3	0	0	0	3 (Note: Appearances in Championship play-offs)	3	52	24
Southampton	2024–25	Premier League	20	2	1	0	2	1	—		23	3
Southampton	2025–26	Championship	29	11	1	0	2	0	—		32	11
Southampton	Total		148	38	12	1	11	1	3	3	174	43
West Bromwich Albion (loan)	2024–25	Championship	16	3	—		—		—		16	3
Wolverhampton Wanderers	2025–26	Premier League	14	2	2	0	—		—		16	2
Wolverhampton Wanderers	2026–27	Championship	13	4	0	0	3	1	—		16	5
Wolverhampton Wanderers	Total		27	6	2	0	3	1	—		32	7
Career total			453	131	20	3	25	8	3	3	501	146

== Honours ==
Blackburn Rovers

- EFL League One second-place promotion: 2017–18

Southampton

- EFL Championship play-offs: 2024

England U17

- UEFA European Under-17 Championship: 2014

England U20

- FIFA U-20 World Cup: 2017

England U21

- Toulon Tournament: 2018

Individual

- PFA Team of the Year: 2015–16 League One, 2020–21 Championship, 2023–24 Championship
- Coventry City Young Player of the Season: 2015–16
- Coventry City Goal of the Season: 2015–16
- Barnsley Goal of the Season: 2016–17
- Blackburn Rovers Player of the Season: 2019–20
- Blackburn Rovers Goal of the Season: 2019–20
- PFA Fans' Player of the Year: 2020–21 Championship
- Southampton Supporters' Player of the Season: 2023–24
- Southampton Players' Player of the Season: 2023–24
- The Athletic Championship Team of the Season: 2023–24
