= Joe Grayson =

English footballer (born 1993)

Personal information
- Full name: Joseph Nicholas Grayson
- Date of birth: 26 March 1999 (age 27)
- Height: 5 ft 10 in (1.78 m)
- Positions: Defender; midfielder

Team information
- Current team: Workington

Youth career
- 2014–2018: Blackburn Rovers

Senior career*
Years	Team	Apps	(Gls)
2018–2021	Blackburn Rovers	0	(0)
2019	→ Grimsby Town (loan)	8	(2)
2021	→ Oxford United (loan)	4	(0)
2021–2023	Barrow	26	(2)
2022–2023	→ Dundee (loan)	13	(1)
2023	→ Stockport County (loan)	0	(0)
2023–2026	Gateshead	58	(1)
2026–	Workington	0	(0)
- * Club domestic league appearances and goals as of 17:32, 25 August 2026 (UTC)

Joseph Nicholas Grayson (born 26 March 1999) is an English professional footballer who plays as a defender or midfielder for Northern Premier League Premier Division club Workington.

Having come through the youth academy at Blackburn Rovers, he spent time on loan with Grimsby Town and Oxford United before signing a permanent contract with Barrow in 2021. He has since played for both Dundee and Stockport County on loan. After leaving Barrow, Grayson joined Gateshead, with whom he won the FA Trophy with at Wembley.

== Early and personal life ==
His father is Simon Grayson. He attended Moorland School.

== Career ==
=== Blackburn Rovers ===
Grayson joined Blackburn Rovers in the 2014, turning professional in July 2017. He made his senior debut on 28 August 2018, in the EFL Cup, in a 4–1 home victory against Lincoln City. In doing so him and his father became the third father-son duo to both play for Blackburn Rovers.

He moved on loan to Grimsby Town in January 2019 for the rest of the season.

On 1 February 2021, Grayson joined League One side Oxford United on loan until the end of the season.

On 13 May 2021, Grayson announced on social media that he was being released by Rovers at the end of the 2020–21 season.

=== Barrow ===
On 23 June 2021, it was announced that Grayson would join League Two side Barrow on a two-year contract following his release from Blackburn. He was injured between December 2021 and April 2022.

On 9 August 2022, Grayson joined Scottish Championship side Dundee on a season-long loan. He made his debut 3 days later in a home win over Arbroath. Grayson scored his first goal for Dundee against Inverness Caledonian Thistle on 17 September 2022. On 18 January 2023, Grayson returned to his parent club after his loan was terminated.

On 1 February 2023, Grayson was confirmed to have joined Stockport County on loan until the end of the season, with the clubs having beaten the previous day's deadline.

He was released by Barrow at the end of the 2022–23 season.

=== Gateshead ===
In July 2023, Grayson joined Hartlepool United on trial. In August 2023 he signed for Gateshead. Grayson played in Gateshead's FA Trophy final victory over Solihull Moors in May 2024. On 5 July 2024, Gateshead announced that Grayson had signed a two-year extension to his contract, keeping him with the Tynesiders until 2026. Grayson scored his first goal for Gateshead on 30 November in a league draw away to Braintree Town.

He left the club in June 2026.

=== Workington ===
On 24 August 2026, Grayson joined Northern Premier League Premier Division club Workington on non-contract terms.

== Style of play ==
Grayson was described by Blackburn Rovers as "a classy left-footed midfielder with a great delivery from set-plays". He can also play as a defender, and Grimsby Town manager Michael Jolley described him as somebody who "is versatile to play in several different positions and adds further strength, balance and competition to our squad".

== Career statistics ==
As of match played 25 April 2026

Appearances and goals by club, season and competition
Club	Season	League			National Cup		League Cup		Other		Total	
Club	Season	Division	Apps	Goals	Apps	Goals	Apps	Goals	Apps	Goals	Apps	Goals
Blackburn Rovers	2018–19	Championship	0	0	0	0	1	0	0	0	1	0
Blackburn Rovers	2019–20	Championship	0	0	0	0	1	0	0	0	1	0
Blackburn Rovers	2020–21	Championship	0	0	0	0	0	0	0	0	0	0
Blackburn Rovers	Total		0	0	0	0	2	0	0	0	2	0
Grimsby Town (loan)	2018–19	League Two	8	2	0	0	0	0	0	0	8	2
Oxford United (loan)	2020–21	League One	4	0	0	0	0	0	2 (Note: Appearance(s) in the EFL Trophy.)	0	6	0
Barrow	2021–22	League Two	26	2	3	0	2	0	2	0	33	2
Barrow	2022–23	League Two	0	0	0	0	0	0	0	0	0	0
Barrow	Total		26	2	3	0	2	0	2	0	33	2
Dundee (loan)	2022–23	Scottish Championship	13	1	1	0	2	0	1 (Note: Appearances in the Scottish Challenge Cup.)	0	17	1
Stockport County (loan)	2022–23	League Two	0	0	0	0	0	0	0	0	0	0
Gateshead	2023–24	National League	28	0	1	0	0	0	4 (Note: Appearance(s) in FA Trophy.)	0	33	0
Gateshead	2024–25	National League	13	1	0	0	0	0	0	0	13	1
Gateshead	2025–26	National League	17	0	1	0	0	0	0	0	18	0
Gateshead	Total		58	1	2	0	0	0	4	0	64	1
Career total			109	6	6	0	6	0	9	0	130	6

== Honours ==
Gateshead

- FA Trophy: 2023–24
