= Billy Barr (footballer) =

English footballer and manager

Personal information
- Full name: William Joseph Barr
- Date of birth: 21 January 1969 (age 57)
- Place of birth: Halifax, England
- Position: Full back

Senior career*
Years	Team	Apps	(Gls)
1987–1994	Halifax Town	196	(13)
1994–1997	Crewe Alexandra	85	(6)
1997–2000	Carlisle United	91	(3)
2000–2002	Workington		
2002–2003	Gretna	4	(0)
Total		376	(22)

Managerial career
- 2002: Carlisle United (caretaker)
- 2014: Wrexham (caretaker)
- 2025–: Workington
- * Club domestic league appearances and goals

William Joseph Barr (born 21 January 1969) is an English former footballer and manager who is currently the manager of Workington.

== Playing career ==
Barr started his career with Halifax Town in July 1987, after coming through the club's youth team. He joined Crewe Alexandra in June 1994. He then moved to Carlisle United in August 1997.

== Coaching career ==
He was caretaker manager of Carlisle United from April to August 2002.He later took up a new coaching role with the first team squad at Preston North End, holding the position of first team coach from the summer of 2006.

He left the club in January 2010 following the appointment of Darren Ferguson as manager. He then joined Alan Irvine at Sheffield Wednesday assuming the role of first team coach.

=== Wrexham ===
In September 2011, Barr joined Wrexham following the appointment of player/manager Andy Morrell. A management team of Morrell, Barr and Michael Oakes took Wrexham to second in the league in the 2011–12 season, finishing on a record 98 points for a second place team. They went on to lose in the play-offs to Luton Town. The following year they took Wrexham to Wembley for the first time in their history, winning the FA Trophy, beating Grimsby Town on penalties. A month and a half later they returned to Wembley, but lost 2–0 to Newport County in the play-off Final.

The following season was a disappointment as Wrexham lost numerous games at the beginning of the season, including 2–0 at home to local rivals Chester. This led the fans to have a lack of belief in manager Andy Morrell, and after a 1–0 home loss to Barnet he resigned, leaving Barr as caretaker manager. Barr confirmed he had applied for the job although lost his first game 5–0 to Luton. Barr left Wrexham with immediate effect on 19 March 2014 after failing to get the managerial job on a permanent basis

=== Blackburn Rovers ===
In August 2019 Barr was appointed head coach for Blackburn Rovers under 23s.

=== Salford City ===
In August 2021 he left Blackburn, joining Salford City as Assistant Manager.

On the 17 May 2022, Barr was sacked along with Gary Bowyer by Salford City.

=== Dundee ===
On 8 June 2022, Bowyer and Barr joined Scottish Championship side Dundee, with Barr in the role of assistant manager to Bowyer. On 10 May 2023, both Barr and Bowyer departed from the club after securing promotion.

=== Carlisle ===
On 9 February 2024 Barr was appointed First Team Coach of Carlisle United. Manager Paul Simpson commented: "I wanted somebody new to come in. I'm looking forward to working with him and I'm hoping he can have a real positive influence on the group."
