= Luke Brennan (English footballer) =

English association football player

Personal information
- Full name: Luke Thomas Brennan
- Date of birth: 19 October 2001 (age 25)
- Place of birth: Liverpool, England
- Height: 6 ft 1 in (1.85 m)
- Positions: Attacking midfielder; right winger

Team information
- Current team: Scunthorpe United
- Number: 10

Youth career
- 2008–2020: Blackburn Rovers

Senior career*
Years	Team	Apps	(Gls)
2020–2022	Blackburn Rovers	1	(0)
2020–2021	→ AFC Fylde (loan)	6	(0)
2022–2024	Wigan Athletic	0	(0)
2023	→ The New Saints (loan)	5	(0)
2024	AFC Fylde	5	(0)
2024–2026	Buxton	72	(25)
2026–	Scunthorpe United	1	(1)
- * Club domestic league appearances and goals as of 20:41, 17 June 2026 (UTC)

Luke Thomas Brennan (born 19 October 2001) is an English professional footballer who plays as an attacking midfielder or right winger for National League club Scunthorpe United.

== Career ==
=== Early career ===
A youth product of Blackburn Rovers Brennan joined at under-7s leve, In July 2020 he signed his 1st professional contract. Brennan made his professional debut coming off the bench on in the 81st minute for Blackburn Rovers in a 1–0 defeat Nottingham Forest on 17 October 2020.

In November 2020, Brennan joined AFC Fylde on loan until the end of the season. In January 2021, Brennan was recalled by Rovers.

On 20 May 2022, Blackburn announced Brennan would be departing the club upon the expiration of his contract on 30 June, with the club opting against offering the player a new deal.

=== Wigan Athletic ===
On 25 June 2022, Wigan announced Brennan would join their u23s.

On 1 September 2023, Brennan joined Welsh Premier League club The New Saints on a season-long loan.

Brennan departed Wigan Athletic upon the expiration of his contract following the 2023–24 season.

=== AFC Fylde ===
On 31 July 2024, Brennan returned to National League side AFC Fylde on a permanent basis, signing a one-year deal following a successful trial.

=== Buxton ===
On 21 November 2024, Brennan joined National League North side Buxton on a permanent deal.

=== Scunthorpe United ===
On 16 June 2026, Brennan signed for National League club Scunthorpe United on a three-year deal for an undisclosed fee.

== Honours ==
Individual

- National League North Team of the Season: 2024–25
