= Joe Hilton (footballer, born 1999) =

English footballer

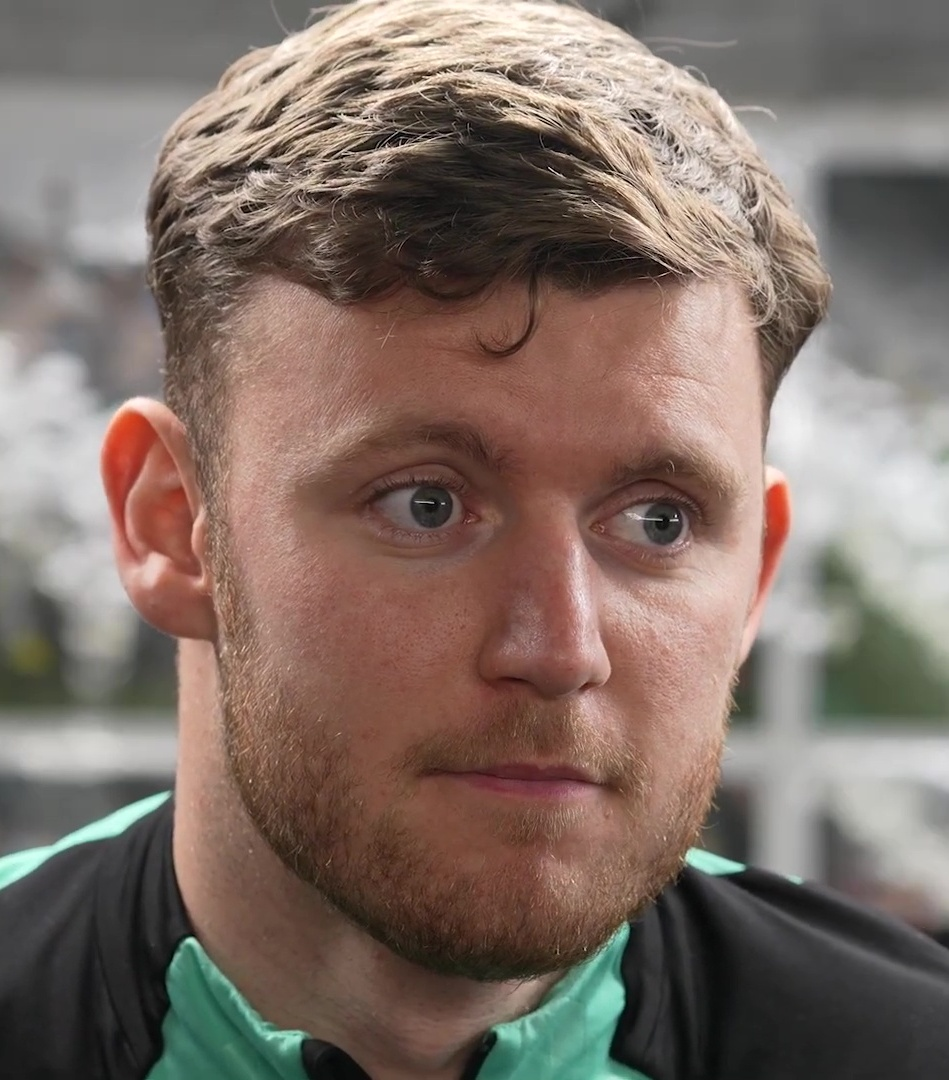
- Hilton in 2025.

Personal information
- Full name: Joseph Robert Hilton
- Date of birth: 11 October 1999 (age 27)
- Place of birth: Sale, England
- Height: 6 ft 6 in (1.98 m)
- Position: Goalkeeper

Youth career
- 2010–2016: Manchester City
- 2016–2018: Everton

Senior career*
Years	Team	Apps	(Gls)
2018–2019	Everton	0	(0)
2019	→ Marine (loan)	17	(0)
2019–2025	Blackburn Rovers	0	(0)
2021	→ Fleetwood Town (loan)	2	(0)
2021	→ Ross County (loan)	0	(0)
2021–2022	→ Hamilton Academical (loan)	16	(0)
2024	→ Macclesfield (loan)	5	(0)
2025–2026	Bradford City	0	(0)
- * Club domestic league appearances and goals as of 15:14, 28 March 2024 (UTC)

Joseph Robert Hilton (born 11 October 1999) is an English professional footballer who plays as a goalkeeper.

== Career ==
Hilton began his career with the youth teams of Manchester City and Everton, also spending time in non-league on loan at Marine, for whom he made 18 appearances in all competitions.

After leaving Everton he signed a two-year contract with Blackburn Rovers in July 2019, moving on an emergency 7 day loan to Fleetwood Town on 12 January 2021. He made his professional debut in the EFL Trophy on 12 January 2021, and his Football League debut on 16 January 2021. He returned to Blackburn after the 7 days ended, having made 3 appearances for Fleetwood. On 27 January 2021, after signing a new one-year contract extension with Blackburn, he headed out on loan once more, this time joining Scottish Premiership side Ross County until the end of the season. On 28 June 2021 Hilton joined Hamilton Academical on loan. On 23 February 2024, Hilton joined Macclesfield on loan until the end of the season.

In February 2025 he signed for Bradford City. After serving as backup to first-choice goalkeeper Sam Walker, Hilton made his debut for the club in July 2025 in a pre-season friendly against FC United of Manchester. He made his competitive debut on 2 September 2025 in the EFL Trophy, and continued to represent the club in the competition. He was released by Bradford City at the end of the 2025–26 season. He then joined the PFA's pre-season training camp to try and find a new club.
