= Sondre Langås =

Norwegian footballer (born 2001)

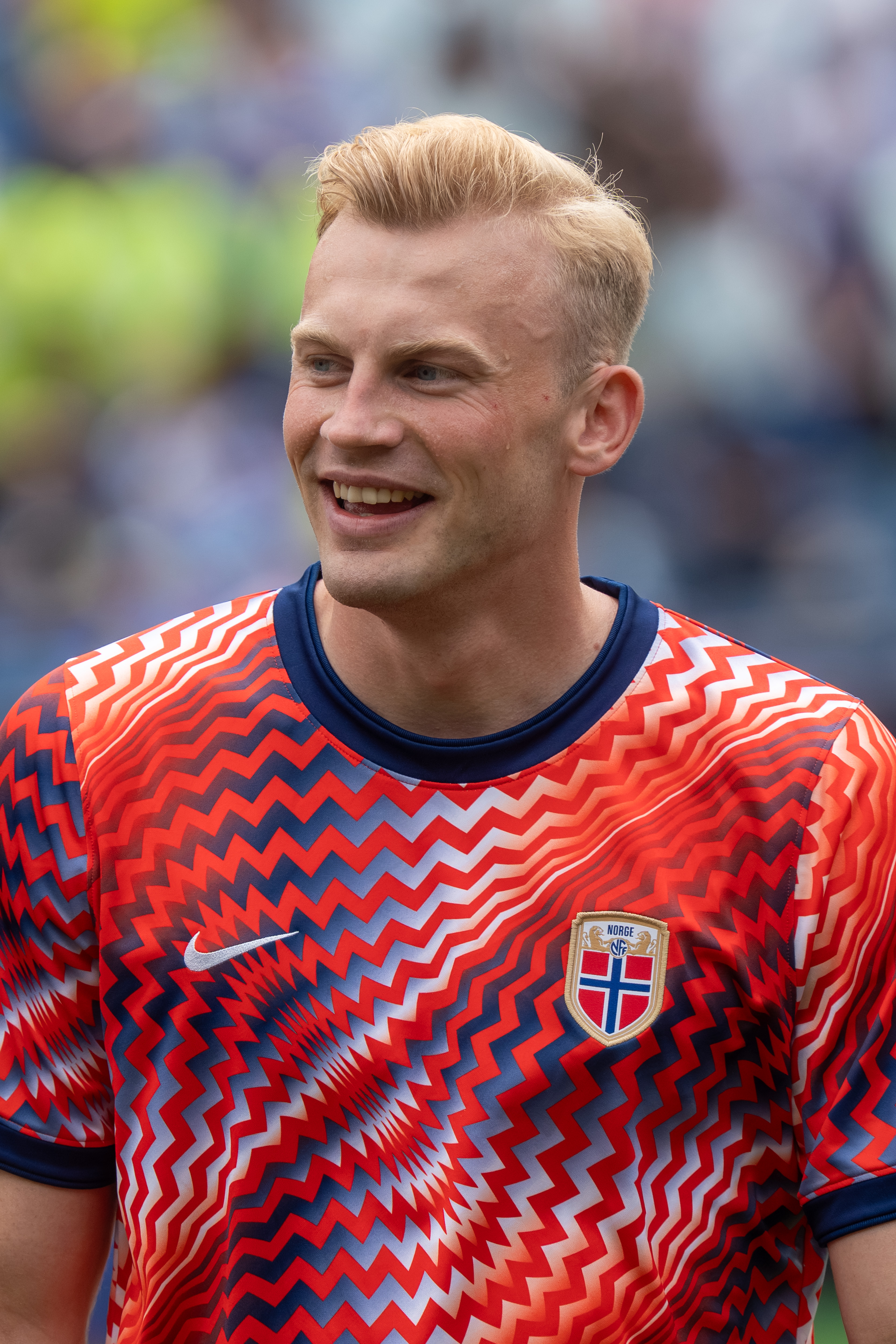
- Langås with Norway in 2026

Personal information
- Full name: Sondre Klingen Langås
- Date of birth: 2 February 2001 (age 25)
- Place of birth: Namsos, Norway
- Height: 1.90 m (6 ft 3 in)
- Position: Defender

Team information
- Current team: Derby County
- Number: 6

Youth career
- Spillum
- –2019: Namsos
- 2019: Ranheim

Senior career*
Years	Team	Apps	(Gls)
2017–2019	Namsos	5	(0)
2020–2023	Ranheim	47	(0)
2020	→ Stjørdals-Blink (loan)	3	(0)
2023–2025	Viking	40	(2)
2025–	Derby County	48	(3)

International career^{‡}
2024–	Norway	4	(0)
- * Club domestic league appearances and goals as of 22:46, 14 October 2026 (UTC) ‡ National team caps and goals as of 21:20, 26 June 2026 (UTC)

Sondre Klingen Langås (born 2 February 2001) is a Norwegian professional footballer who plays as a defender for EFL Championship club Derby County and the Norway national team.

Langås made his debut in the Norwegian Eliteserien for Viking. He made his debut for Norway in 2024.

== Club career ==
=== Early career ===
Langås started his youth career in the rural club Spillum before moving on to Namsos. He then played in the Norwegian First Division for Ranheim and Stjørdals-Blink (on loan from Ranheim).

=== Viking ===
In May 2023, Langås was wanted by Rosenborg BK and trained with the team, together with Ranheim teammate Ruben Alte. On 24 July 2023, he signed a four-and-a-half-year contract with Eliteserien club Viking. He made his debut on 13 August 2023 against Lillestrøm. On 16 September 2023, he scored his first goal in a 2–0 away win over Haugesund.

=== Derby County ===
On 1 February 2025, Langås joined English Championship club Derby County on a four-and-a-half-year contract for a fee reported to be in the region of 60 million kr. The move saw him reunite with former Viking teammate Lars-Jørgen Salvesen whom had joined the same club earlier in the transfer window. Langås made his Derby debut in a 1–1 draw at Norwich City on 8 February 2025. In March 2025, Langås sustained a hamstring injury; however with the club in a relegation battle to stay in the Championship, he decided to delay surgery to the end the season with head coach John Eustace stating that Langås went through the "pain barrier" for the club. Langås became part of a back-three alongside Matt Clarke and Nat Phillips; which helped Derby finish 19th in the Championship and beat relegation by one point, with Langås making 14 appearances during his first season for Derby. Langås said in July 2025 interview that he played through the pain barrier during the period, confirming what Eustace said in March.

In June 2025, it was confirmed by Eustace that Langås would miss the start of the 2025–26 season due to rehabilitation from his knee surgery he had in May. Langås returned to first-team action on 21 October 2025 against Norwich City. On 22 November 2025, Langås scored his first goal for Derby in a 2–3 loss to Watford. On 10 December 2025, Langås was named captain for the first time in Derby's match against Millwall, with club captain Lewis Travis being unavailable due to injury and vice-captain Ebou Adams being on the bench for the match, with Eustace stating his character being part of the decision to give him the armband. In January 2026, Langås sustained a hamstring injury, which ruled him out for ten matches. He made 25 appearances during his first full season in England, scoring three goals.

== International career ==
Langås made his debut for the Norway national team on 9 September 2024 in a Nations League game against Austria at Ullevaal Stadion. He substituted Alexander Sørloth in added time of Norway's 2–1 victory.

On 21 May 2026, Langås was included in the 26-man squad selected by Norway national team manager Ståle Solbakken for the 2026 FIFA World Cup. Langås made one appearance in a group stage game against France, as Norway reached the quarter-final stage of the tournament.

== Career statistics ==
=== Club ===
As of match played 14 October 2026

Appearances and goals by club, season and competition
Club	Season	League			National cup (Note: Includes Norwegian Cup, FA Cup)		League cup (Note: Includes EFL Cup)		Total	
Club	Season	Division	Apps	Goals	Apps	Goals	Apps	Goals	Apps	Goals
Namsos	2017	4. divisjon	1	0	0	0	—		1	0
Namsos	2018	4. divisjon	4	0	0	0	—		4	0
Namsos	Total		5	0	0	0	—		5	0
Ranheim	2020	1. divisjon	2	0	—		—		2	0
Ranheim	2021	1. divisjon	7	0	0	0	—		7	0
Ranheim	2022	1. divisjon	27	0	3	0	—		30	0
Ranheim	2023	1. divisjon	11	0	4	1	—		15	1
Ranheim	Total		47	0	7	1	—		54	1
Stjørdals-Blink (loan)	2020	1. divisjon	3	0	0	0	—		3	0
Viking	2023	Eliteserien	10	1	0	0	—		10	1
Viking	2024	Eliteserien	30	1	3	0	—		33	1
Viking	Total		40	1	3	0	—		43	1
Derby County	2024–25	Championship	14	0	—		—		14	0
Derby County	2025–26	Championship	24	3	1	0	0	0	25	3
Derby County	2026–27	Championship	10	0	0	0	1	0	11	0
Derby County	Total		48	3	1	0	1	0	50	3
Career total			143	5	11	1	1	0	155	6

=== International ===
As of match played 26 June 2026

Appearances and goals by national team and year
National team	Year	Apps	Goals
Norway	2024	2	0
Norway	2025	0	0
Norway	2026	2	0
Total		4	0
