= 2026–27 Derby County F.C. season =

English football club season

Derby County F.C.
2026–27 season
- Owner: David Clowes
- Chairman: David Clowes
- Head Coach: John Eustace
- Stadium: Pride Park Stadium
- Top goalscorer: League: Sammie Szmodics (1); All: Sammie Szmodics (2)
- Highest home attendance: 11,095 vs. Lincoln City; 8 August 2026
- Lowest home attendance: 11,095 vs. Lincoln City; 8 August 2026
- Average home league attendance: 11,095
- Biggest win: -
- Biggest defeat: 1-2
Home colours	Away colours

The 2026–27 season is Derby County's 128th season in the Football League and their 57th in the second tier of English football. It is their third consecutive season being in the Championship. They also compete in the FA Cup and the EFL Cup.

== Transfers and contracts ==
=== In ===
Date	Pos.	Player	From	Fee	Ref.
First team
22 June 2026	CM	(England) Bobby Clark	(Austria) Red Bull Salzburg	£6,000,000	
14 July 2026	LB	(England) Charlie Taylor	(England) Southampton	Free	
22 July 2026	LW	(Germany) Filip Bilbija	(Germany) Paderborn 07	Free	
14 August 2026	CDM	(England) Alex Mowatt	(England) West Bromwich Albion	£600,000	
20 August 2026	RW	(Wales) Ryan Hedges	(England) Blackburn Rovers	Free	
2 September 2026	DM	(England) David Ozoh	(England) Crystal Palace	Undisclosed	
4 September 2026	GK	(Australia) Nicholas Bilokapic	(England) Ipswich Town	Free	
17 October 2026	CB	(England) Jack Robinson	(England) Birmingham City	Free	
29 October 2026	CB	(Republic of Ireland) Shane Duffy	(England) Norwich City	Free	
Academy
17 July 2026	LWB	(England) Frankie Jones	(England) Sheffield United	Free	
17 July 2026	LW	(England) Kean Wren	(England) Everton	Free	
13 October 2026	GK	(England) Eterne Djedje	(England) AFC Wimbledon	Free	
13 October 2026	GK	(Scotland) Alfie Halliwell	(Scotland) Rangers	Free	
15 October 2026	CF	(England) Zach Marsh	(England) Crystal Palace	Free	

=== Loaned in ===
Date	Pos.	Player	From	Loaned until	Ref.
First team
31 July 2026	CAM	(Republic of Ireland) Sammie Szmodics	(England) Ipswich Town	End of Season	
30 August 2026	CF	(Denmark) Henrik Meister	(Italy) Pisa	End of Season (Note: Option to make the move permanent)	
1 September 2026	CB	(Republic of Ireland) Eiran Cashin	(England) Brighton & Hove Albion	End of Season	
1 September 2026	CF	(Ghana) Mohammed Fuseini	(Belgium) Union Saint-Gilloise	End of Season	
Academy

=== Loaned out ===
Date	Pos.	Player	To	Date until	Ref.
First team
6 August 2026	CF	(Jamaica) Dajaune Brown	(England) Rochdale	End of Season	
3 September 2026	CAM	(England) Owen Eames	(Scotland) Falkirk	End of Season	
8 September 2026	CM	(Netherlands) Kenzo Goudmijn	(Switzerland) Grasshopper Club Zurich	End of Season	
Academy
4 August 2026	GK	(Poland) Cristiano Dzialuk	(England) Worcester City	End of Season	
15 August 2026	RB	(Republic of Ireland) Freddie Turley	(Scotland) Dunfermline Athletic	End of Season	
27 August 2026	CB	(Northern Ireland) Alfie Friars	(England) Leek Town	24 September 2026	
28 August 2026	CAM	(Wales) Cruz Allen	(England) FC Halifax Town	30 November 2026 (Note: On 29 September, Allen's initial one-month loan at FC Halifax Town was extended for another month. On 30 October, it was extended again for a further month.)	
18 September 2026	LB	(England) Tristan Gill	(England) FC Halifax Town	17 October 2026	
26 September 2026	GK	(Scotland) Sam Kane	(England) Gloucester City	21 October 2026	
3 October 2026	CB	(Northern Ireland) Alfie Friars	(England) 1874 Northwich	30 November 2026 (Note: On 30 October, Friars' initial one-month loan at 1874 Northwich was extended for a further month.)	
3 October 2026	GK	(England) Harley Price	(England) Anstey Nomads	3 November 2026	
6 November 2026	CB	(England) Luke Banks	(England) Stafford Rangers	5 December 2026	
6 November 2026	GK	(Scotland) Alfie Halliwell	(England) Worcester City	5 December 2026	

=== Out ===
Date	Pos.	Player	To	Fee	Ref.
First team
5 August 2026	CM	(England) Liam Thompson	(England) Mansfield Town	Undisclosed	
Academy

=== Released / Out of Contract ===
Date	Pos.	Player	Subsequent club	Joined date	Ref.
First team
30 June 2026	LB	(Australia) Callum Elder	(England) Lincoln City	1 July 2026	
30 June 2026	CB	(England) Jake Rooney	(England) Boston United	23 July 2026	
30 June 2026	CM	(England) Ben Osborn	(England) Stockport County	27 July 2026	
30 June 2026	CB	(England) Danny Batth	(England) Millwall	2 August 2026	
30 June 2026	CF	(Austria) Andreas Weimann	(England) Cheltenham Town	14 August 2026	
Academy
30 June 2026	CB	(Wales) Dan Cox	(England) Southend United	1 July 2026	
30 June 2026	LB	(England) Billy Gough	(England) Alfreton Town	1 July 2026	
30 June 2026	CM	(Germany) Jamie Wähling	(Malta) Hibernians	17 July 2026	
30 June 2026	CF	(England) Lennon Wheeldon	(England) Boston United	3 August 2026	
30 June 2026	GK	(England) Harry Evans			
30 June 2026	CDM	(England) Harry Hawkins			
30 June 2026	RB	(England) Jack Perry			

=== New Contract ===
Date	Pos.	Player	Contract expiry	Ref.
First team
Academy
15 May 2026	CM	(Republic of Ireland) Niall McAndrew	30 June 2027	
15 May 2026	RW	(England) Jerome Richards	30 June 2027	
15 May 2026	CB	(England) Keilen Robinson	30 June 2027	
24 June 2026	CAM	(Wales) Cruz Allen	30 June 2028	
17 July 2026	RW	(Northern Ireland) Sean Corry	Undisclosed (Note: First professional contract)	
17 July 2026	CB	(Northern Ireland) Alfie Friars	Undisclosed	
17 July 2026	RB	(England) Khace Gordon	Undisclosed	
17 July 2026	CF	(England) Israel Green	Undisclosed	
17 July 2026	CM	(Mongolia) Dantel Hodges	Undisclosed	
17 July 2026	CAM	(England) Marley Mintus	Undisclosed	

== Pre-season and friendlies ==
On 20 May, The Rams announced a week-long pre-season training camp in Tyrol, Austria between 18–25 July, with a match against Bundesliga side Freiburg later added. On 29 May, the club confirmed a friendly match against Alfreton Town. Six days later, a trip to Rotherham United was announced. On 8 June, the schedule was bolstered with the addition of a trip to face Mansfield Town. Two days, a fixture against Burton Albion in the Bass Charity Vase was announced as part of the pre-season schedule. A behind closed doors meeting with Valencia was also later confirmed.

Win Draw Loss Fixtures

17 July 2026 Friendly	Alfreton Town	0–2	Derby County	Alfreton
19:00 BST		Report	Ward 14'; Clark 33'	Stadium: Solana Stadium

24 July 2026 Friendly	Derby County	1–3	Freiburg	Imst, Austria
16:00 CEST	Morris 14'	Report	Irié 9'; Grifo 109'; Catak 120'	Stadium: Velly Arena

28 July 2026 Friendly	Derby County	1–2	Valencia	Burton upon Trent
15:00 BST	Eames	Report	Danjuma (x2)	Stadium: St. George's Park; Attendance: 0 (BCD)

31 July 2026 Friendly	Mansfield Town	1−3	Derby County	Mansfield
19:00 BST	M. Smith 31'	Report	Brown 22'; C. Smith 57'; Allen 70'	Stadium: One Call Stadium

1 August 2026 Bass Charity Vase	Burton Albion	1–0	Derby County	Burton upon Trent
15:00 BST	Shade 11' (pen.)	Report		Stadium: Pirelli Stadium; Attendance: 3,908 (1,200 Derby fans)

4 August 2026 Friendly	Derby County	1–1	Port Vale	Oakwood
13:00 BST	Brewster	Report	Waine	Stadium: Moor Farm Training Centre; Attendance: 0 (BCD)

4 August 2026 Friendly	Rotherham United	1–1	Derby County	Rotherham
19:30 BST	Ashley 65', (yellow card) 84'	Report	Szmodics 9' (pen.); Clark (yellow card) 83'; Eames (yellow card) 87'	Stadium: AESSEAL New York Stadium; Attendance: 2,239 (1,108 Derby fans)

12 November 2026 Friendly	Everton	4−1	Derby County	Vauxhall
14:00 GMT	Alcaraz (x2); Nørgaard; Nsangou	Report	Salvesen	Stadium: Hill Dickinson Stadium; Attendance: 0 (BCD)

== Competitions ==
=== Overall record ===
Competition	First match	Last match	Starting round	Final position	Record							
Competition	First match	Last match	Starting round	Final position	Pld	W	D	L	GF	GA	GD	Win %
Championship	August 2026	May 2027	Matchday 1	TBC	0	0	0	0	0	0	+0	—
FA Cup	January 2027	TBC	Third round	TBC	0	0	0	0	0	0	+0	—
EFL Cup	August 2026	August 2026	First round	First round	1	0	0	1	1	2	−1	0.00
Total					1	0	0	1	1	2	−1	0.00

Last updated: 8 August 2026
Source: Soccerway

=== Championship ===
==== League table ====
Pos	Team	Pld	W	D	L	GF	GA	GD	Pts	Promotion, qualification or relegation
20	Watford	15	4	3	8	13	23	−10	15	
21	Lincoln City	15	4	3	8	15	26	−11	15	
22	Burnley	15	1	7	7	22	31	−9	10	Relegation to EFL League One
23	Derby County	15	2	4	9	14	30	−16	10	Relegation to EFL League One
24	Preston North End	15	2	2	11	13	30	−17	8	Relegation to EFL League One

Updated to match(es) played on 7 November 2026. Source: EFL Official Website
Rules for classification: 1) Points; 2) Goal difference; 3) Number of goals scored; 4) Head-to-head results; 5) Wins; 6) Away goals; 7) Penalty points (sec 9.5); 8) Number of 12-point sending off offences; 9) Play-off (only if needed to determine promotion/relegation)

==== Results summary ====
Overall								Home						Away					
Pld	W	D	L	GF	GA	GD	Pts	W	D	L	GF	GA	GD	W	D	L	GF	GA	GD
15	2	4	9	14	30	−16	10	1	2	5	7	15	−8	1	2	4	7	15	−8

Last updated: 7 November 2026.
Source: Soccerway

==== Results by round ====
Round	1	2	3	4	5	6	7	8	9	10	11	12	13	14	15	16	17	18	19	20	21	22	23	24	25	26	27	28	29	30	31
Ground	A	H	H	A	A	H	H	A	H	A	H	A	A	H	H	A	A	H	A	H	A	H	A	H	H	A	H	A	A	H	A
Result	L	D	L	W	L	L	L	D	D	L	L	D	L	L	W																
Position	17	17	21	20	20	22	22	22	23	23	23	23	23	23	23																
Points	0	1	1	4	4	4	4	5	6	6	6	7	7	7	10																

Source: EFL
A = Away; H = Home; W = Win; D = Draw; L = Loss; P = Postponed

==== Matches ====
On 25 June, the Championship fixtures were revealed.

Win Draw Loss Upcoming fixture

15 August 2026 1	Charlton Athletic	2–1	Derby County	Charlton
15:00 BST	Jones 61'; Campbell 80'	Report	Szmodics 23'; Langås (yellow card) 60'; Mowatt (yellow card) 90'; Brewster (yellow card) 90+8'	Stadium: The Valley; Attendance: 21,539 (3,054 away); Referee: Benjamin Speedie

22 August 2026 2	Derby County	2–2	Cardiff City	Derby
15:00 BST	Blackett-Taylor (yellow card) 9'; Morris 26'; Clark 49'; Fraulo (yellow card) 55'; Travis (yellow card) 60'; Johnston (yellow card) 80'; Sanderson (yellow card) 84'	Report	Ashford 19'; Salech 39'; Robertson (yellow card) 53'	Stadium: Pride Park Stadium; Attendance: 28,926 (inc. 2,771 away supporters); Referee: Ruebyn Ricardo

29 August 2026 3	Derby County	0–3	Swansea City	Derby
12:30 BST	Langås (yellow card) 69'; Sanderson (yellow card) 79'; Travis (yellow card) 81'		Opoku 2'; Eom Ji-sung 44'; Stamenić (yellow card) 73'; Just (yellow card) 84'; Ronald 90+1'	Stadium: Pride Park Stadium; Attendance: 26,576; Referee: David Webb
Note: Fixture was initially scheduled for a 15:00 kick-off, but was brought forward for live Sky Sports broadcasting.

1 September 2026 4	Portsmouth	0–2	Derby County	Milton
19:45 BST	Devlin (yellow card) 69'	Report	Szmodics 16'; Langås (yellow card) 51'; Salvesen 62'; Taylor (yellow card) 83'	Stadium: Fratton Park; Attendance: 20,282 (inc. 1,567 Derby fans); Referee: Sam Allison

5 September 2026 5	West Ham United	3–0	Derby County	Stratford
15:00 BST	Piroe 6'; Austbø 87'; Kanté 90+5'	Report	Mowatt (yellow card) 21'; Fuseini (yellow card) 77'	Stadium: London Stadium; Referee: Oli Langford

9 September 2026 6	Derby County	0–1	West Bromwich Albion	Derby
19:45 BST		Report	Whitwell (yellow card) 10'; Heggebø 16'; Pereira (yellow card) 26' (red card) 34'; Morgan (yellow card) 82'	Stadium: Pride Park Stadium; Attendance: 27,323; Referee: James Bell

12 September 2026 7	Derby County	1–2	Birmingham City	Derby
12:30 BST	Fuseini (yellow card) 19'; Clark 40'	Report	Cochrane (yellow card) 21'; Vicente 42', (yellow card) 90+4'; Priske (yellow card) 44'; Paik Seung-ho 63'	Stadium: Pride Park Stadium; Referee: John Busby
Note: Fixture was initially scheduled for a 15:00 kick-off, but was brought forward for live Sky Sports broadcasting.

19 September 2026 8	Burnley	1–1	Derby County	Burnley
15:00 BST	Igor Julio (yellow card) 31'; Amdouni 34'; Ahmedhodžić (yellow card) 56'; Laurent (yellow card) 68'; Raghouber (yellow card) 86'	Report	Ozoh (yellow card) 67'; Blackett-Taylor (yellow card) 87'; Fuseini 90+3'	Stadium: Turf Moor; Attendance: 19,456; Referee: Stephen Martin

10 October 2026 9	Derby County	1–1	Wrexham	Derby
15:00 BST	Langås (yellow card) 5'; Szmodics 9'; Hedges (yellow card) 52'; Mowatt (yellow card) 74'		Rathbone (yellow card) 71', (goal) 88'; Moore (yellow card) 90+1'	Stadium: Pride Park Stadium; Attendance: 29,136; Referee: Matt Donohue

14 October 2026 10	Queens Park Rangers	4–1	Derby County	Shepherd's Bush
19:45 BST	Lloyd 18'; Madsen 22' (pen.); Vale 45', (yellow card) 57'; Kamara (yellow card) 60'; Smyth 68'		Ozoh (yellow card) 24'; Szmodics (yellow card) 44'; Meister (yellow card) 56'; Salvesen 90+10'	Stadium: MATRADE Loftus Road; Referee: Matthew Corlett

17 October 2026 11	Derby County	0–1	Stoke City	Derby
15:00 BST	Ozoh (yellow card) 76'		Graham 49'	Stadium: Pride Park Stadium; Referee: Oliver Langford

24 October 2026 12	Sheffield United	1–1	Derby County	Sheffield
12:30 BST	Kitching (yellow card) 64'; Peck (yellow card) 75'; Bamford 79'	Report	Nyambe (yellow card) 17'; Clark 37', (yellow card) 90+4'; Sanderson (yellow card) 50' (red card) 66'	Stadium: Bramall Lane; Attendance: 26,424; Referee: Steve Martin
Note: Fixture was initially scheduled for a 15:00 kick-off, but was brought forward for live Sky Sports broadcasting.

31 October 2026 13	Millwall	4–1	Derby County	Bermondsey
15:00 GMT	Lisbie 3', 10'; Cundle 17'; Dykes (yellow card) 24'; Mazou-Sacko (yellow card) 32'; Cooper 84'; Metcalfe (yellow card) 89'	Report	Brewster (yellow card) 45+1'; Morris (yellow card) 71'; Bilbija 87'	Stadium: The Den; Referee: John Busby

3 November 2026 14	Derby County	0–4	Norwich City	Derby
19:45 GMT	Nyambe (yellow card) 38'	Report	Musaba 8'; Maghoma 27'; Yongwa 44'; Makama 66'	Stadium: Pride Park Stadium; Attendance: 25,637; Referee: Sam Allison

6 November 2026 15	Derby County	3–1	Bolton Wanderers	Derby
20:00 GMT	Nyambe 46'; Robinson 49'; Brewster 90+4'	Report	Rodrigues 42'; Stephenson (yellow card) 62'; Larrazabal (yellow card) 90+5'	Stadium: Pride Park Stadium; Attendance: 27,536; Referee: James Bell
Note: Fixture was initially scheduled for 7 November, but was brought forward to the night preceding for live Sky Sports broadcasting.

21 November 2026 16	Southampton	v	Derby County	Southampton
12:30 GMT				Stadium: St Mary's Stadium
Note: Fixture was initially scheduled for a 15:00 kick-off, but was brought forward for live Sky Sports broadcasting.

24 November 2026 17	Wolverhampton Wanderers	v	Derby County	Wolverhampton
20:00 GMT				Stadium: Molineux Stadium
Note: Fixture was initially scheduled for a 19:45 kick-off, but was pushed back for live Sky Sports broadcasting.

28 November 2026 18	Derby County	v	Watford	Derby
15:00 GMT				Stadium: Pride Park Stadium

5 December 2026 19	Middlesbrough	v	Derby County	Middlesbrough
12:30 GMT				Stadium: Riverside Stadium
Note: Fixture was initially scheduled for a 15:00 kick-off, but was brought forward for live Sky Sports broadcasting.

9 December 2026 20	Derby County	v	Bristol City	Derby
19:45 GMT				Stadium: Pride Park Stadium

12 December 2026 21	Blackburn Rovers	v	Derby County	Blackburn
15:00 GMT				Stadium: Ewood Park

19 December 2026 22	Derby County	v	Lincoln City	Derby
15:00 GMT				Stadium: Pride Park Stadium

26 December 2026 23	Preston North End	v	Derby County	Preston
15:00 GMT				Stadium: Deepdale

29 December 2026 24	Derby County	v	Sheffield United	Derby
19:45 GMT				Stadium: Pride Park Stadium

1 January 2027 25	Derby County	v	Blackburn Rovers	Derby
15:00 GMT				Stadium: Pride Park Stadium

16 January 2027 26	Stoke City	v	Derby County	Stoke-on-Trent
12:30 GMT				Stadium: bet365 Stadium
Note: Fixture was initially scheduled for a 15:00 kick-off, but was brought forward for live Sky Sports broadcasting.

23 January 2027 27	Derby County	v	Millwall	Derby
15:00 GMT				Stadium: Pride Park Stadium

26 January 2027 28	Norwich City	v	Derby County	Norwich
20:00 GMT				Stadium: Carrow Road
Note: Fixture was initially scheduled for a 19:45 kick-off, but was pushed back for live Sky Sports broadcasting.

30 January 2027 29	Bolton Wanderers	v	Derby County	Horwich
12:30 GMT				Stadium: Toughsheet Community Stadium
Note: Fixture was initially scheduled for a 15:00 kick-off, but was brought forward for live Sky Sports broadcasting.

6 February 2027 30	Derby County	v	Southampton	Derby
15:00 GMT				Stadium: Pride Park Stadium

12 February 2027 31	Birmingham City	v	Derby County	Bordesley
20:00 GMT				Stadium: St Andrew's @ Knighthead Park
Note: Fixture was initially scheduled for 13 February, but was brought forward for live Sky Sports broadcasting.

=== FA Cup ===
Win Draw Loss Fixtures

=== EFL Cup ===
Derby were drawn at home to Lincoln City in the first round.

Win Draw Loss Fixtures

8 August 2026 First round	Derby County	1–2	Lincoln City	Derby
15:00 BST	Travis (yellow card) 35'; Szmodics 45+1'	Report	House 3', (yellow card) 48'; Jefferies 23'; Reach (yellow card) 32'	Stadium: Pride Park Stadium; Attendance: 11,095 (inc. 1,720 away fans); Referee: Josh Smith

== Statistics ==
=== Appearances and goals ===
As of match played 7 November 2026

Players with no appearances are not included on the list; italics indicate a loaned in player

No.	Pos	Nat	Player	Total		Championship		FA Cup		EFL Cup	
No.	Pos	Nat	Player	Apps	Goals	Apps	Goals	Apps	Goals	Apps	Goals
1	GK	(Sweden) SWE	Jacob Widell Zetterström	12	0	11+0	0	0+0	0	1+0	0
3	DF	(Scotland) SCO	Craig Forsyth	3	0	2+0	0	0+0	0	0+1	0
4	MF	(England) ENG	David Ozoh	10	0	9+1	0	0+0	0	0+0	0
5	DF	(England) ENG	Matthew Clarke	1	0	0+0	0	0+0	0	1+0	0
6	DF	(Norway) NOR	Sondre Langås	11	0	10+0	0	0+0	0	1+0	0
8	MF	(England) ENG	Bobby Clark	16	3	14+1	3	0+0	0	1+0	0
9	FW	(England) ENG	Carlton Morris	12	1	11+0	1	0+0	0	1+0	0
10	FW	(England) ENG	Rhian Brewster	12	1	5+7	1	0+0	0	0+0	0
11	MF	(Republic of Ireland) IRL	Sammie Szmodics	14	4	12+1	3	0+0	0	1+0	1
13	MF	(Germany) GER	Filip Bilbija	8	1	0+7	1	0+0	0	0+1	0
14	DF	(England) ENG	Jack Robinson	4	1	2+2	1	0+0	0	0+0	0
15	FW	(Norway) NOR	Lars-Jørgen Salvesen	14	2	1+12	2	0+0	0	0+1	0
16	FW	(Ghana) GHA	Mohammed Fuseini	10	1	6+4	1	0+0	0	0+0	0
18	DF	(England) ENG	Charlie Taylor	9	0	8+0	0	0+0	0	1+0	0
19	FW	(Denmark) DEN	Henrik Meister	9	0	5+4	0	0+0	0	0+0	0
20	MF	(England) ENG	Alex Mowatt	12	0	9+3	0	0+0	0	0+0	0
22	DF	(Scotland) SCO	Max Johnston	9	0	4+4	0	0+0	0	0+1	0
23	MF	(England) ENG	Joe Ward	11	0	7+3	0	0+0	0	1+0	0
24	DF	(Namibia) NAM	Ryan Nyambe	9	1	6+3	1	0+0	0	0+0	0
25	DF	(Republic of Ireland) IRL	Shane Duffy	1	0	1+0	0	0+0	0	0+0	0
26	FW	(Wales) WAL	Ryan Hedges	12	0	10+2	0	0+0	0	0+0	0
27	MF	(England) ENG	Lewis Travis	8	0	5+2	0	0+0	0	1+0	0
28	DF	(England) ENG	Dion Sanderson	14	0	13+0	0	0+0	0	0+1	0
29	MF	(Denmark) DEN	Oscar Fraulo	12	0	5+6	0	0+0	0	1+0	0
31	GK	(England) ENG	Josh Vickers	4	0	4+0	0	0+0	0	0+0	0
33	FW	(England) ENG	Corey Blackett-Taylor	9	0	2+6	0	0+0	0	1+0	0
37	MF	(England) ENG	Owen Eames	1	0	0+1	0	0+0	0	0+0	0
43	DF	(England) ENG	Isaac Gordon	1	0	1+0	0	0+0	0	0+0	0
44	DF	(Republic of Ireland) IRL	Eiran Cashin	2	0	2+0	0	0+0	0	0+0	0
