= Owen Eames =

English footballer (born 2006)

Personal information
- Full name: Owen Thomas Eames
- Date of birth: 1 November 2006 (age 20)
- Place of birth: Swadlincote, England
- Position: Midfielder

Team information
- Current team: Falkirk (on loan from Derby County)
- Number: 42

Youth career
- –2026: Derby County

Senior career*
Years	Team	Apps	(Gls)
2025–	Derby County	5	(0)
2026–	→ Falkirk (loan)	9	(2)
- * Club domestic league appearances and goals as of 18:00, 8 November 2026 (UTC)

Owen Thomas Eames (born 1 November 2006) is an English professional footballer who plays as a midfielder for Scottish Premiership club Falkirk, on loan from EFL Championship club Derby County.

A youth product of Derby County, Eames made his first team debut in 2026, after signing his first professional contract in 2025. In September 2026, he was loaned to Scottish club Falkirk for the 2026–27 season.

== Career ==
Born in Swadlincote, Eames joined the Derby County's academy in the under-8 age group. He progressed through the age groups in Derby's academy, making his Derby for the under-18s aged 16 in 2023 and the under-21s aged 18 in 2024. Eames featured as an unused substitute in two first team matches in March 2025.

In July 2025, Eames signed his first professional contract at Derby County. In the 2025–26 season, Eames became a regular member of the under-21 team and began training and featuring in more first team training sessions and matchday squads. Derby head coach John Eustace praised Eames' development and ability alongside the first team squad.

On 11 January 2026, Eames made his first-team debut for Derby County in a 3–1 FA Cup third round defeat to Leeds United as a 73rd-minute substitute for Bobby Clark. Eames showed energy in this appearance, winning free kicks for his side and making a 70-yard run to stop a counterattack by Leeds. Later in January, it was announced that Eames had signed a contract extension at Derby with a new expiry date of June 2029. On 30 January 2026, Eames made his league debut for Derby County in a 5–0 Championship win at Bristol City as a 78th-minute substitute for Ben Brereton Díaz, Eames was denied a goal in this match he hit the crossbar in the 86th minute when his goalbound effort was blocked by Robert Dickie. Eames made five appearances for the during his first season in the first team.

Eames played once for Derby's first team at the start of the 2026–27 season, before being loaned to Scottish Premiership club Falkirk on 3 September 2026 for the remainder of the 2026–27 season in a bid to get regular first team football. Eames made his Falkirk debut on 5 September, starting a 1–1 draw at Dundee United, this was his first start in first team football.

== Style of play ==
Eames has creative ability with pace and energy which helps him press the opposition. He also been described as an "unselfish" player.

== Career statistics ==
As of match played 18 September 2026

Appearances and goals by club, season and competition
Club	Season	League			FA Cup		EFL Cup		Other		Total	
Club	Season	Division	Apps	Goals	Apps	Goals	Apps	Goals	Apps	Goals	Apps	Goals
Derby County	2025–26	Championship	4	0	1	0	0	0	—		5	0
Derby County	2026–27	Championship	1	0	0	0	0	0	—		1	0
Derby County	Total		5	0	1	0	0	0	0	0	6	0
Falkirk (loan)	2026–27	Scottish Premiership	2	1	0	0	—		—		2	1
Career total			7	1	1	0	0	0	0	0	7	0
