= Matthew Clarke (footballer, born 1996) =

English footballer (born 1996)

Matt Clarke
Personal information
- Full name: Matthew Edward Barkell Clarke
- Date of birth: 22 September 1996 (age 30)
- Place of birth: Barham, Suffolk, England
- Height: 6 ft 1 in (1.85 m)
- Position: Centre-back

Team information
- Current team: Derby County
- Number: 5

Youth career
- 2002–2014: Ipswich Town

Senior career*
Years	Team	Apps	(Gls)
2014–2016	Ipswich Town	4	(0)
2015–2016	→ Portsmouth (loan)	29	(1)
2016–2019	Portsmouth	121	(6)
2019–2022	Brighton & Hove Albion	0	(0)
2019–2020	→ Derby County (loan)	35	(1)
2020–2021	→ Derby County (loan)	42	(0)
2021–2022	→ West Bromwich Albion (loan)	33	(1)
2022–2025	Middlesbrough	44	(3)
2025–	Derby County	61	(4)
- * Club domestic league appearances and goals as of 13:51, 2 May 2026 (UTC)

Matthew Edward Barkell Clarke (born 22 September 1996) is an English professional footballer who plays as a central defender for EFL Championship club Derby County.

Clarke started his career at Ipswich Town, before joining Portsmouth initially on loan in 2015, making the move permanent in 2016. In 2019, Clarke joined Premier League Brighton & Hove Albion, but failed to make an appearance, he had two loan spells at Derby County in the 2019–20 and 2020–21 seasons and one at West Bromwich Albion in 2021–22. Clarke joined Middlesbrough on a permanent deal in August 2022, before rejoining Derby County in January 2025.

== Club career ==
=== Ipswich Town ===
Born in Barham, Suffolk, Clarke joined Ipswich Town academy as an U7 and signed a scholarship with the club in the summer of 2013. He was included in the main squad for the pre-season in the following year.

Clarke made his professional debut for the club on 12 August 2014, starting as a left back in a 1–0 Football League Cup away loss against Crawley Town. On 11 September he signed a two-year professional deal with the club.

=== Portsmouth ===
In July 2015, Clarke went on a trial at Portsmouth, signing a six-month loan deal with the club on 3 August.

On 2 September 2015, Clarke signed a new two-year contract at Ipswich Town, contracting him to the club until June 2017. His loan deal at Portsmouth was subsequently extended until the end of the season in January 2016.

Clarke signed a permanent three-year deal with Pompey on 1 July 2016, after a swap with Ipswich for Adam Webster was agreed. Despite suffering an injury at the end of the 2015–16 campaign which ruled him out of the opening weeks of the new campaign, he established himself as one of Portsmouth's most reliable performers as they won the 2016–17 League Two title. His partnership with Christian Burgess ensured that Portsmouth conceded the fewest league goals over the course of the season, letting in just 40 goals in 46 matches.

On 14 February 2018, after remaining a regular starter, Clarke extended his contract until 2020.

Clarke was in the winning squad for Portsmouth in the EFL Trophy Final on 31 March 2019.

=== Brighton & Hove Albion ===
On 21 June 2019, Clarke's departure from Portsmouth was announced, with the centre-back signing a four-year deal at Brighton & Hove Albion for an undisclosed fee.

==== Derby County (loans) ====
On 2 August 2019, Clarke joined Derby County on a season-long loan. Three days later, Clarke made his debut for Derby in their opening game of the season in a 2–1 away win against Huddersfield Town. He scored his first goal for the club in a 1–0 win against Hull City on 18 January 2020. He made 37 appearances for Derby during the 2019–20 season, with his performances earning him the Derby County Player of the Year award.

On 26 August, it was revealed that Clarke would return to Derby on a further season-long loan deal for the 2020–21 season. He made 42 appearances in his second season including in the last game as the team's safety was taken to the wire, ensuring their Championship status after a 3–3 home draw to Sheffield Wednesday on the final day of the season. Rotherham United's draw with Cardiff City meant Derby were safe with Rotherham and Sheffield Wednesday relegated.

==== West Bromwich Albion (loan) ====
On 13 July 2021, Clarke signed for West Bromwich Albion on loan for the 2021–22 season. He made his debut on 14 August, starting and playing 84 minutes of the 3–2 home victory over Luton Town. He helped keep a clean sheet four days later, playing the whole match of the 4–0 victory against Sheffield United at The Hawthorns. He was named as the club's Player of the Season for 2021–22, his fourth successive such award across three clubs. On 7 May, on Clarke's final appearance on loan at West Brom he scored his first and only goal for the club with a composed finish slipping the ball under Barnsley goalkeeper Jack Walton, in the 4–0 home victory as his team ended the campaign in 10th place.

=== Middlesbrough ===
On 25 August 2022, Clarke joined Championship club Middlesbrough for an undisclosed fee. In two-and-a-half years at the club, Clarke made 51 appearances, scoring three times.

=== Derby County ===
On 28 January 2025, Clarke rejoined Derby County on a deal until June 2025 after an undisclosed fee was agreed with Middlesbrough. Clarke scored his first Derby goal since resigning for the club in a 2–0 home victory against Coventry City. Under new head coach John Eustace, Clarke impressed with his performance in a central defensive trio alongside Sondre Langås and Nat Phillips as Derby managed to escape relegation to League One, Clarke played 16 times for Derby during 2024–25 season and on 15 May 2025, Clake signed a three-year contract extension with Derby; extending his stay at Pride Park until June 2028.

On 22 August 2025, Clarke made his 100th appearance for Derby in a match against Bristol City. In the 2025–26 season, Clarke played in every minute of Derby's first 27 Championship matches, scoring a late equaliser against at home to Charlton Athletic in September 2025. In January, this run came to an end during his 28th match as he was sent off for a second bookable offence in the reverse fixture at Charlton in January 2026; this led to a one match suspension. On 14 February 2026, Clark captained Derby County for the first time, covering in the role for the suspended Lewis Travis in a 2–0 win over Swansea City. Clarke was a nominee for Championship Player of the Month for March 2026, after scoring a goal and being part of a defence with conceded one goal in four game during this month. Clarke was named Derby County's Player of the Season for the 2025–26 season, the second time he was won this award. Clarke made 46 appearances for Derby County in all competitions during the season, scoring three goals.

In Derby County's first competitive game of the 2026–27 season in an EFL Cup tie against Lincoln City on 8 August 2026, Clarke was taken off at half time after sustaining a calf injury which would later be revealed would leave him out of action for three months.

== Career statistics ==
As of match played 8 August 2026

Appearances and goals by club, season and competition
Club	Season	League			FA Cup		League Cup		Other		Total	
Club	Season	Division	Apps	Goals	Apps	Goals	Apps	Goals	Apps	Goals	Apps	Goals
Ipswich Town	2014–15	Championship	4	0	0	0	1	0	0	0	5	0
Portsmouth (loan)	2015–16	League Two	29	1	2	0	2	0	0	0	33	1
Portsmouth	2016–17	League Two	33	1	1	0	0	0	2 (Note: Appearances in EFL Trophy)	0	36	1
Portsmouth	2017–18	League One	42	2	1	0	0	0	3	1	46	3
Portsmouth	2018–19	League One	46	3	5	0	1	0	8 (Note: Six appearances and one goal in EFL Trophy, two appearances in EFL League One Play-offs)	1	60	4
Portsmouth	Total		150	7	9	0	3	0	13	2	175	9
Brighton & Hove Albion	2019–20	Premier League	0	0	0	0	0	0	—		0	0
Brighton & Hove Albion	2020–21	Premier League	0	0	0	0	0	0	—		0	0
Brighton & Hove Albion	2021–22	Premier League	0	0	0	0	0	0	—		0	0
Brighton & Hove Albion	2022–23	Premier League	0	0	0	0	0	0	—		0	0
Brighton & Hove Albion	Total		0	0	0	0	0	0	0	0	0	0
Derby County (loan)	2019–20	Championship	35	1	1	0	1	0	—		37	1
Derby County (loan)	2020–21	Championship	42	0	0	0	2	0	—		44	0
Derby County (loan)	Total		77	1	1	0	3	0	0	0	81	1
West Bromwich Albion (loan)	2021–22	Championship	33	1	0	0	0	0	—		33	1
Middlesbrough	2022–23	Championship	6	0	0	0	0	0	0	0	6	0
Middlesbrough	2023–24	Championship	24	1	1	0	3	0	—		28	1
Middlesbrough	2024–25	Championship	14	2	1	0	2	0	—		17	2
Middlesbrough	Total		44	3	2	0	5	0	0	0	51	3
Derby County	2024–25	Championship	16	1	—		—		—		16	1
Derby County	2025–26	Championship	45	3	0	0	1	0	—		46	3
Derby County	2026–27	Championship	0	0	0	0	1	0	—		1	0
Derby County	Total		61	4	0	0	2	0	0	0	63	4
Career total			369	16	12	0	14	0	13	2	408	18

== Honours ==
Portsmouth

- EFL League Two: 2016–17
- EFL Trophy: 2018–19

Individual

- Portsmouth Player's Player of the Season: 2017–18
- Portsmouth Player of the Season: 2017–18, 2018–19
- 2018–19 EFL Trophy Final Man of The Match: 2019
- PFA Team of the Year: 2018–19 League One
- Derby County Player of the Year: 2019–20, 2025–26
- West Bromwich Albion Player of the Year: 2021–22
