= Josh Vickers =

English footballer (born 1995)

Personal information
- Full name: Joshua Anthony Vickers
- Date of birth: 1 December 1995 (age 30)
- Place of birth: Brentwood, England
- Height: 1.93 m (6 ft 4 in)
- Position: Goalkeeper

Team information
- Current team: Derby County
- Number: 31

Youth career
- 2010–2014: Arsenal

Senior career*
Years	Team	Apps	(Gls)
2013–2015	Arsenal	0	(0)
2013–2014	→ Canvey Island (loan)	30	(0)
2014–2015	→ Concord Rangers (loan)	26	(0)
2015–2017	Swansea City	0	(0)
2016–2017	→ Barnet (loan)	23	(0)
2017–2020	Lincoln City	70	(0)
2020–2023	Rotherham United	23	(0)
2023–	Derby County	24	(0)
- * Club domestic league appearances and goals as of 16:17, 17 October 2026 (UTC)

Joshua Anthony Vickers (born 1 December 1995) is an English footballer who plays as a goalkeeper for EFL Championship club Derby County.

Vickers was on the books of Arsenal and Swansea City without playing first-team football for either, and made his Football League debut while on loan at Barnet. He then had spells at Lincoln City and Rotherham United before joining Derby County in 2023.

== Career ==
=== Early career ===
Vickers began his career at Arsenal's Academy. As a second-year scholar, he joined Isthmian League side Canvey Island on loan in August 2013 where he played 30 league games. before returning to the Gunners and signing a professional contract. Vickers then joined Concord Rangers, of the Conference South, on a one-month loan in November 2014, which was later extended until the end of the 2014–15 season. In August 2015, Vickers signed for Swansea City on a two-year deal. He joined Barnet on a season-long loan in July 2016, and made his English Football League debut when he started against Cambridge United on 6 August 2016.

=== Lincoln City ===
He was released by Swansea at the end of the 2016–17 season. Following his release, Vickers joined League Two club Lincoln City on a two-year deal. On 28 May 2020, it was announced Vickers would leave the club at the end of his current contract.

=== Rotherham United ===
On 6 November 2020, Vickers signed for Rotherham United on a deal until the end of the season. Vickers did not make an appearance for Rotherham during the 2020–21 season, but he signed a new contract until June 2023 at the conclusion of that season During the 2021–22 season Vickers shared goalkeeping duties with Viktor Johansson where he appeared 25 times in the starting 11, with Vickers taking part in 20 League One games from October 2021 to March 2022, this was a successful season for Rotherham as they gained promotion to the Championship. During the 2022–23 season Vickers struggled for gametime as Johansson became the regular starter, he was limited the three Championship appearances in April 2023. At the end of the season, Vickers was offered a new deal on "improved terms" by Rotherham which he rejected.

=== Derby County ===
On 20 June 2023, Vickers joined Derby County, on a three-year contract, where he would team up with goalkeeping coach Andy Warrington after they worked together at Lincoln and Rotherham. Paul Warne was Derby manager at the time of his signing also managed Vickers at Rotherham. Vickers made his Derby debut in EFL Cup on 8 August 2023 in a 2–0 loss against Blackpool, his league debut came on 2 September 2023 in a 2–1 loss at Bolton Wanderers as a 50th minute substitute after first choice goalkeeper Joe Wildsmith was sent-off. Vickers made his first league start for the club in a 3-1 victory at Fleetwood Town 6 January 2024. Warne after the game stated that he felt he had two "number 1" goalkeepers in Vickers and Wildsmith. Vickers had a run of six starts, before picking up a thigh injury in early February. Vickers kept two clean sheets in these appearances as Derby gained promotion to the Championship, Vickers made 12 appearances in total for Derby during the season.

After the departure of Wildsmith and Derby being unable to sign a replacement before the start of the 2024–25 season, Vickers went it to season Derby's only senior goalkeeper on the books and he started the season as default first choice goalkeeper. Jacob Widell Zetterström was soon signed to goalkeeping department with Vickers having a man of the match performance against in 1–0 victory over Middlesbrough on 17 August 2024 with new signing Widell Zetterström on the bench, having joined the club a day earlier. After this match; Widell Zetterström would become number 1 with Vickers being demoted back to 2nd choice having played in Derby's first three matches of the season. Vickers came in for Derby's final four games of the season after Zetterström picked up a fractured eye socket, with a fantastic save in a 3–1 win away at West Bromwich Albion winning him the club's 'Save of the Season' award, saving a Tom Fellows strike.

Zetterström returned from his injury by the start of the 2025–26 season and Vickers returned to being understudy goalkeeper. On 27 January 2026, Vickers signed a new three-and-half year contract at Derby, extending his stay at Derby until June 2029. After a spell on sidelines with a thumb injury, Vickers made his first league appearance of the season for Derby on 7 February 2026 against Ipswich Town covering for Zetterström. Vickers would make 7 consecutive league starts for Derby until 10 March 2026, when he was force off late on in a match against Millwall, it was later confirmed that Vickers sustained a torn groin and would be would out of six to eight weeks. Vickers played 9 times for Derby County during the season.

== Personal life ==
On 1 June 2023, Vickers and his partner Laura got married. On 19 September 2023, Laura Vickers died due to cancer. Derby players shared a tribute to Vickers during Derby's match against Carlisle United on 23 September with players doing pre-game warm-ups in training kits with Vickers squad number of 31, as well as holding up his kit whilst celebrating the first goal in a 2–0 win and again post match, in front of visiting Derby supporters.

== Career statistics ==
As of match played 17 October 2026

Appearances and goals by club, season and competition
Club	Season	League			FA Cup		League Cup		Other		Total	
Club	Season	Division	Apps	Goals	Apps	Goals	Apps	Goals	Apps	Goals	Apps	Goals
Canvey Island (loan)	2013–14	Isthmian League Premier Division	30	0	2	0	0	0	0	0	32	0
Concord Rangers (loan)	2014–15	Conference South	26	0	2	0	0	0	3 (Note: Appearance in the F.A. Trophy)	0	31	0
Barnet (loan)	2016–17	League Two	23	0	0	0	1	0	2 (Note: Appearances in the Football League Trophy)	0	26	0
Lincoln City	2017–18	League Two	17	0	1	0	1	0	1 (Note: Appearance in the Football League Trophy)	0	20	0
Lincoln City	2018–19	League Two	18	0	3	0	0	0	0	0	21	0
Lincoln City	2019–20	League One	35	0	2	0	0	0	0	0	37	0
Lincoln City	Total		70	0	6	0	1	0	1	0	78	0
Rotherham United	2020–21	Championship	0	0	0	0	0	0	—		0	0
Rotherham United	2021–22	League One	20	0	2	0	0	0	3 (Note: Appearances in the EFL Trophy)	0	25	0
Rotherham United	2022–23	Championship	3	0	0	0	2	0	—		5	0
Rotherham United	Total		23	0	2	0	2	0	3	0	30	0
Derby County	2023–24	League One	7	0	0	0	1	0	4	0	12	0
Derby County	2024–25	Championship	6	0	0	0	1	0	—		7	0
Derby County	2025–26	Championship	7	0	0	0	2	0	—		9	0
Derby County	2026–27	Championship	4	0	0	0	0	0	—		4	0
Derby County	Total		24	0	0	0	4	0	4	0	32	0
Career total			196	0	12	0	8	0	13	0	228	0

== Honours ==
Lincoln City

- EFL League Two: 2018–19
- EFL Trophy: 2017–18

Rotherham United

- EFL League One second-place promotion: 2021–22

Derby County

- EFL League One second-place promotion: 2023–24
