= Dion Sanderson =

English footballer (born 1999)

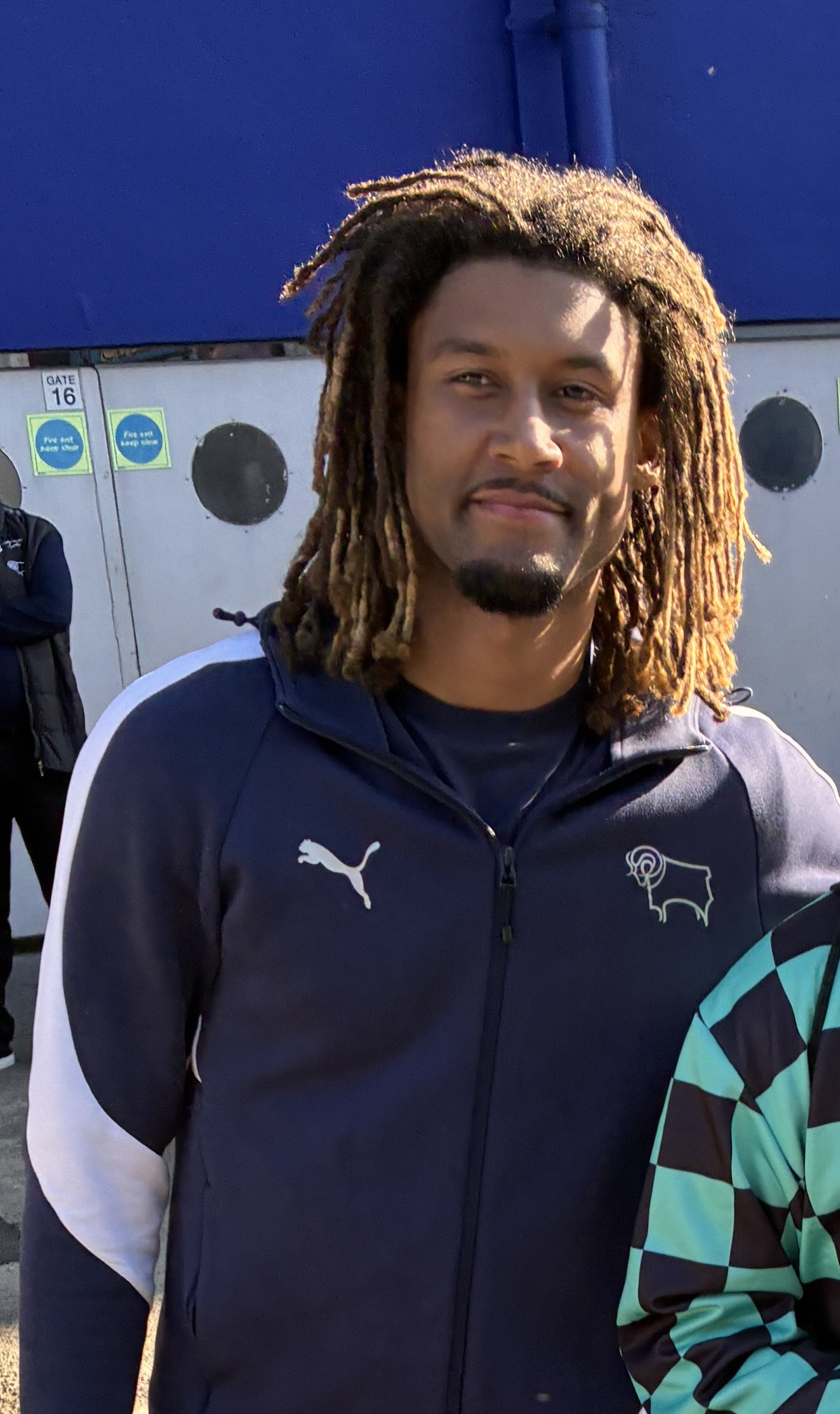
- Sanderson in 2026

Personal information
- Full name: Dion Dannie Leonard Sanderson
- Date of birth: 15 December 1999 (age 26)
- Place of birth: Wednesfield, England
- Height: 6 ft 2 in (1.88 m)
- Position: Defender

Team information
- Current team: Derby County
- Number: 28

Youth career
- 2007–2019: Wolverhampton Wanderers

Senior career*
Years	Team	Apps	(Gls)
2019–2023	Wolverhampton Wanderers	0	(0)
2020	→ Cardiff City (loan)	10	(0)
2020–2021	→ Sunderland (loan)	26	(1)
2021–2022	→ Birmingham City (loan)	15	(0)
2022	→ Queens Park Rangers (loan)	11	(0)
2022–2023	→ Birmingham City (loan)	31	(2)
2023–2026	Birmingham City	39	(1)
2025	→ Blackburn Rovers (loan)	12	(0)
2025	→ Derby County (loan)	22	(1)
2026–	Derby County	29	(0)
- * Club domestic league appearances and goals as of 22:32, 6 November 2026 (UTC)

Dion Dannie Leonard Sanderson (born 15 December 1999) is an English footballer who plays as a defender for EFL Championship club Derby County.

He began his career as a youngster with Wolverhampton Wanderers and later spent time on loan at Cardiff City, Sunderland, Birmingham City (two spells) and Queens Park Rangers, before leaving for Birmingham City in 2023. He spent the second half of the 2024–25 season on loan to Blackburn Rovers. In August 2025, he joined Derby County on a season-long loan, the move was made permanent early at the start of 2026.

== Career ==
=== Wolverhampton Wanderers and loan spells ===
Sanderson joined Wolverhampton Wanderers' academy as an eight-year-old, signed his first professional contract in 2018, and a year later signed a two-year contract with a 12-month option. He was a member of the senior squad for their pre-season tour of China, where he played in the club's Premier League Asia Trophy Final victory over Manchester City. He made his competitive debut on 30 October 2019 in an EFL Cup tie against Aston Villa.

Sanderson joined EFL Championship club Cardiff City on 31 January 2020 on loan to the end of the season.

==== Sunderland (loan) ====
After Sanderson's contract with Wolves was extended until 2022, he joined League One club Sunderland in October 2020 on a season-long loan. He scored his first goal for Sunderland, and his first professional goal, in a 2–0 win against Rochdale on 6 March 2021. He was cup-tied for Sunderland's victory in the 2021 EFL Trophy Final.

Near the end of April, Sanderson was ruled out for the rest of the season due to a back injury, so missed out on Sunderland's unsuccessful play-off campaign. He was voted as Sunderland's Supporters' Young Player of the Year.

==== Birmingham City (loan) ====
Sanderson signed a new four-year deal with Wolves before joining Championship club Birmingham City on 19 July 2021 on a season-long loan. He made his first-team debut for Birmingham in the EFL Cup second-round match at home to Fulham. Starting in a three-man defence alongside the experienced George Friend and fellow debutant Mitch Roberts, he played for 73 minutes before being replaced by another newcomer, Alfie Chang. He made his first league appearance on 18 September in a 3–0 defeat away to Peterborough United, replacing the injured Marc Roberts at half-time with the score 2–0, and established himself as a regular member of the starting eleven. However, on 4 January 2022, with several Wolves defenders injured or away on international duty, Sanderson was recalled on 4 January 2022.

==== Queens Park Rangers (loan) ====
Sanderson joined another Championship club, Queens Park Rangers, on 25 January 2022 on loan for the remainder of the season. He made 12 appearances, all but one in league competition.

==== Birmingham City (second loan) ====
Sanderson rejoined Championship club Birmingham City on 5 July 2022 on a season-long loan. As he did during his previous loan, he started regularly, and was described in the Birmingham Mail's mid-season assessment as "a classy presence on the right side of the back three", more athletic but less physically dominant than Marc Roberts or Harlee Dean when played centrally. By February 2023, he was struggling both with a back injury and the need to avoid a tenth yellow card and resultant two-match ban. He remained on nine cards, but after 33 starts and one goal, he returned to Wolves for treatment to his back. Despite being initially ruled out for the season, he was able to start and score a late volleyed goal in Birmingham's final fixture, a 2–1 defeat at home to already promoted Sheffield United.

=== Birmingham City ===
After lengthy negotiations, Sanderson joined Birmingham City on a four-year contract on 15 July 2023; the fee was undisclosed. He was appointed captain.

==== Blackburn Rovers (loan) ====
On 10 January 2025, Sanderson joined Championship club Blackburn Rovers on loan until the end of the season, reuniting with former manager John Eustace for the third time in his career. He made 12 league appearances.

=== Derby County ===
On 5 August 2025, Sanderson joined fellow Championship club Derby County on a season long loan. Reuniting with Eustace for the fourth time. On 9 August 2025, Sanderson made his debut for Derby in a 3–1 defeat at Stoke City, as an injury time substitute for Kayden Jackson. On 22 November 2025, Sanderson scored his first goal for Derby in a 3–2 loss against Watford.

On 31 December 2025, Sanderson signed for the Rams on a permanent basis for an undisclosed fee, signing a two-and-a-half year contract. He played 24 times during his loan spell at the club. He played a further 16 times during the season after December making it 40 in total across his loan and permanent spells.

== Personal life ==
He is a nephew of the 1984 Olympic javelin gold medallist Tessa Sanderson.

In April 2024, Sanderson was charged with drink-driving.

== Career statistics ==
As of match played 6 November 2026

Appearances and goals by club, season and competition
Club	Season	League			FA Cup		EFL Cup		Other		Total	
Club	Season	Division	Apps	Goals	Apps	Goals	Apps	Goals	Apps	Goals	Apps	Goals
Wolverhampton Wanderers	2019–20	Premier League	0	0	0	0	1	0	0	0	1	0
Wolverhampton Wanderers	2020–21	Premier League	0	0	0	0	0	0	—		0	0
Wolverhampton Wanderers	2021–22	Premier League	0	0	0	0	0	0	—		0	0
Wolverhampton Wanderers	2022–23	Premier League	0	0	0	0	0	0	—		0	0
Wolverhampton Wanderers	Total		0	0	0	0	1	0	0	0	1	0
Wolverhampton Wanderers U21	2019–20	—			—		—		3 (Note: Appearance(s) in EFL Trophy)	0	3	0
Wolverhampton Wanderers U21	2020–21	—			—		—		1	0	1	0
Wolverhampton Wanderers U21	Total		—		—		—		4	0	4	0
Cardiff City (loan)	2019–20	Championship	10	0	0	0	0	0	—		10	0
Sunderland (loan)	2020–21	League One	26	1	1	0	0	0	0	0	27	1
Birmingham City (loan)	2021–22	Championship	15	0	0	0	1	0	—		16	0
Queens Park Rangers (loan)	2021–22	Championship	11	0	1	0	—		—		12	0
Birmingham City (loan)	2022–23	Championship	31	2	3	0	0	0	—		34	2
Birmingham City	2023–24	Championship	37	1	1	0	2	0	—		40	1
Birmingham City	2024–25	League One	2	0	1	0	1	0	3	0	7	0
Birmingham City	2025–26	Championship	0	0	0	0	0	0	—		0	0
Birmingham City	Total		71	3	5	0	3	0	3	0	81	3
Blackburn Rovers (loan)	2024–25	Championship	12	0	—		—		—		12	0
Derby County (loan)	2025–26	Championship	22	1	0	0	2	0	—		24	1
Derby County	2025–26	Championship	16	0	0	0	—		—		16	0
Derby County	2026–27	Championship	13	0	0	0	1	0	—		14	0
Derby County	Total		29	0	0	0	1	0	0	0	30	0
Career total			194	5	7	0	8	0	7	0	216	5
