= 2025–26 Derby County F.C. season =

English football club season

Derby County
2025–26 season
- Owner: David Clowes
- Chairman: David Clowes
- Head coach: John Eustace
- Stadium: Pride Park Stadium
- Championship: 8th
- FA Cup: Third round
- EFL Cup: Second round
- Top goalscorer: League: Carlton Morris (12); All: Carlton Morris (12)
- Highest home attendance: 32,538 vs Sheffield United; 2 May 2026, Championship
- Lowest home attendance: 21,741 vs Leeds United; 11 January 2026, FA Cup
- Average home league attendance: 28,911
- Biggest win: 5–0 vs Bristol City (A); 30 January 2026, Championship
- Biggest defeat: List: 1–3 vs Stoke City (A) 9 August 2025, Championship 3–5 vs Coventry City (H) 16 August 2025, Championship 1–3 vs Leicester City (H) 6 December 2025, Championship 1–3 vs Leeds United (H) 11 January 2026, FA Cup 0–2 vs Watford (A) 21 February 2026, Championship 2–4 vs Hull City (A) 24 February 2026, Championship
Home colours	Away colours

The 2025–26 season was Derby County's 127th season in the Football League and their 56th in the second tier of English football. It was their second consecutive season in the Championship. They also competed in the FA Cup and the EFL Cup.

== Players ==
List includes all first team players and any other matchday squad players

No.	Name	Position	Nationality	Date of birth (age)	Signed from	Signed	Fee	Contract ends
Goalkeepers
1	Jacob Widell Zetterström	GK	(Sweden)	11 July 1998 (age 28)	(Sweden) Djurgården	2024	Undisclosed	2027
12	Richard O'Donnell	GK	(England)	12 September 1988 (age 38)	Blackpool	2025	Free	2027
31	Josh Vickers	GK	(England)	1 December 1995 (age 30)	Rotherham United	2023	Free	2029
51	Harley Price	GK	(England)	18 September 2006 (age 20)	Academy	2023	—N/a	
52	Jack Thompson	GK	(England)	14 December 2006 (age 19)	Academy	2023	—N/a	2026
Defenders
2	Derry Murkin	LB	(England)	27 July 1999 (age 27)	(Netherlands) FC Utrecht	2026	Undisclosed	2029
3	Craig Forsyth	LB	(Scotland)	24 February 1989 (age 37)	Watford	2013	£150,000	2027
4	Danny Batth	CB	(England)	21 September 1990 (age 36)	Blackburn Rovers	2025	Free	2026
5	Matt Clarke	CB	(England)	22 September 1996 (age 30)	Middlesbrough	2025	Undisclosed	2028
6	Sondre Langås	CB	(Norway)	2 February 2001 (age 25)	(Norway) Viking	2025	Undisclosed	2029
20	Callum Elder	LB	(Australia)	27 January 1995 (age 31)	Hull City	2023	Free	2026
22	Max Johnston	RB	(Scotland)	26 December 2003 (age 22)	(Austria) Sturm Graz	2025	Undisclosed	2029
28	Dion Sanderson	CB	(England)	15 December 1999 (age 26)	Birmingham City	2026	Undisclosed	2028
44	Isaac Gordon	RB	(England)	3 January 2007 (age 19)	Academy	2023	—N/a	2027
53	Rio Canoville	CB	(England)	19 March 2008 (age 18)	Academy	2024	—N/a	2028
Midfielders
16	Liam Thompson	CM	(England)	29 April 2002 (age 24)	Academy	2018	—N/a	2027
18	David Ozoh	DM	(England)	6 May 2005 (age 21)	Crystal Palace	2025	Loan	2026
19	Sammie Szmodics	AM	(Republic of Ireland)	24 September 1995 (age 31)	Ipswich Town	2026	Loan	2026
23	Joe Ward	RM	(England)	22 August 1995 (age 31)	Peterborough United	2023	Free	2027
27	Lewis Travis	DM	(England)	16 October 1997 (age 29)	Blackburn Rovers	2025	Undisclosed	2029
29	Oscar Fraulo	CM	(Denmark)	6 December 2003 (age 22)	(Germany) Borussia Mönchengladbach	2026	Undisclosed	2029
37	Owen Eames	CM	(England)	1 November 2006 (age 20)	Academy	2023	—N/a	2029
42	Bobby Clark	CM	(England)	7 February 2005 (age 21)	(Austria) Red Bull Salzburg	2025	Loan	2026
45	Charlie Smith	CM	(England)	11 November 2008 (age 18)	Academy	2025	—N/a	2028
54	Cruz Allen	AM	(Wales)	25 February 2007 (age 19)	Academy	2023	—N/a	2026
Forwards
7	Patrick Agyemang	CF	(United States)	7 November 2000 (age 26)	(United States) Charlotte	2025	Undisclosed	2029
9	Carlton Morris	CF	(England)	16 December 1995 (age 30)	Luton Town	2025	Undisclosed	2028
10	Rhian Brewster	CF	(England)	1 April 2000 (age 26)	Sheffield United	2025	Free	2027
15	Lars-Jørgen Salvesen	CF	(Norway)	19 February 1996 (age 30)	(Norway) Viking	2025	Undisclosed	2027
25	Ben Brereton Díaz	CF	(Chile)	18 April 1999 (age 27)	Southampton	2025	Loan	2026
34	Jaydon Banel	LW	(Netherlands)	19 October 2004 (age 22)	Burnley	2026	Loan	2026
Out on loan
8	Ben Osborn	CM	(England)	5 August 1994 (age 32)	Sheffield United	2024	Free	2026
11	Corey Blackett-Taylor	LW	(England)	23 September 1997 (age 29)	Charlton Athletic	2024	Free	2027
14	Andreas Weimann	AM	(Austria)	5 August 1991 (age 35)	Blackburn Rovers	2025	Free	2026
17	Kenzo Goudmijn	CM	(Netherlands)	18 December 2001 (age 24)	(Netherlands) AZ Alkmaar	2024	Undisclosed	2028
21	Jake Rooney	CB	(England)	22 August 2003 (age 23)	Burnley	2022	Free	2026
24	Ryan Nyambe	RB	(Namibia)	4 December 1997 (age 28)	Free Agent	2023	—N/a	2027
39	Dajaune Brown	CF	(Jamaica)	16 October 2005 (age 21)	Academy	2022	—N/a	2027
48	Lennon Wheeldon	CF	(England)	16 February 2006 (age 20)	Academy	2022	—N/a	

== Transfers and contracts ==
=== In ===
Date	Pos.	Player	From	Fee	Ref.
26 June 2025	CF	(England) Carlton Morris	(England) Luton Town	Undisclosed	
1 July 2025	CB	(England) Danny Batth	(England) Blackburn Rovers	Free	
1 July 2025	GK	(England) Richard O'Donnell	(England) Blackpool	Free	
1 July 2025	AM	(Austria) Andreas Weimann	(England) Blackburn Rovers	Free	
15 July 2025	CF	(United States) Patrick Agyemang	(United States) Charlotte	Undisclosed	
31 July 2025	RW	(Scotland) Cameron Wilson (Note: Signed initially for the Under-21s)	(Scotland) Aberdeen	Undisclosed	
1 August 2025	CF	(England) Rhian Brewster	(England) Sheffield United	Free	
14 August 2025	CM	(Germany) Jamie Wähling	(Germany) TSG Hoffenheim	Free	
27 August 2025	RB	(Scotland) Max Johnston	(Austria) Sturm Graz	Undisclosed	
27 August 2025	DM	(England) Lewis Travis	(England) Blackburn Rovers	Undisclosed	
17 October 2025	GK	(Scotland) Sam Kane	(Scotland) Queen's Park	Undisclosed	
1 January 2026 (Note: The transfer was announced on 31 December, and would become official on 1 January once the transfer window opened)	CB	(England) Dion Sanderson	(England) Birmingham City	Undisclosed	
2 January 2026	CM	(Denmark) Oscar Fraulo	(Germany) Borussia Mönchengladbach	Undisclosed	
2 February 2026	LB	(England) Derry Murkin	(Netherlands) FC Utrecht	Undisclosed	
2 February 2026	CB	(Republic of Ireland) Raymond Offor	(Republic of Ireland) Shelbourne	Undisclosed	

=== Out ===
Date	Pos.	Player	To	Fee	Ref.
1 June 2025 (Note: The transfer was announced on 27 May, and would become official on 1 June once the transfer window opened)	RW	(Guatemala) Nathaniel Mendez-Laing	(England) Milton Keynes Dons	Undisclosed	
31 August 2025	RB	(England) Kane Wilson	(England) Milton Keynes Dons	Undisclosed	
2 January 2026	DM	(Northern Ireland) Darren Robinson	(England) Doncaster Rovers	Undisclosed	
15 January 2026	CB	(England) Curtis Nelson	(England) Milton Keynes Dons	Undisclosed	
16 January 2026	CM	(The Gambia) Ebou Adams	(England) Portsmouth	Undisclosed	
30 January 2026	CF	(England) Kayden Jackson	(England) Bradford City	Undisclosed	

=== Loaned in ===
Date	Pos.	Player	From	Date until	Ref.
25 July 2025	LB	(Wales) Owen Beck	(England) Liverpool	4 January 2026 (Note: On 4 January, Beck's season-long loan was terminated)	
29 July 2025	DM	(England) David Ozoh	(England) Crystal Palace	31 May 2026	
5 August 2025	CM	(England) Bobby Clark	(Austria) Red Bull Salzburg	31 May 2026	
5 August 2025	CB	(England) Dion Sanderson	(England) Birmingham City	31 December 2025 (Note: On 31 December, Sanderson's season-long loan was terminated and he signed for the club on a permanent basis on 1 January)	
31 August 2025	CF	(Chile) Ben Brereton Díaz	(England) Southampton	31 May 2026	
29 January 2026	LW	(Netherlands) Jaydon Banel	(England) Burnley	31 May 2026	
2 February 2026	AM	(Republic of Ireland) Sammie Szmodics	(England) Ipswich Town	31 May 2026	

=== Loaned out ===
Date	Pos.	Player	To	Date until	Ref.
18 July 2025	CB	(Wales) Dan Cox	(England) Walsall	5 January 2026 (Note: On 5 January, Cox's season-long loan at Walsall was terminated)	
28 July 2025	DM	(Northern Ireland) Darren Robinson	(Republic of Ireland) St Patrick's Athletic	30 November 2025	
8 August 2025	GK	(England) Harry Evans	(Northern Ireland) Coleraine	4 January 2026	
12 August 2025	GK	(England) Jack Thompson	(England) Worcester City	9 September 2025	
27 August 2025	CF	(Jamaica) Dajaune Brown	(England) Port Vale	31 May 2026	
1 September 2025	CM	(England) Ben Osborn	(England) Stockport County	31 May 2026	
1 September 2025	CB	(England) Jake Rooney	(England) Barnsley	1 January 2026 (Note: On 1 January, Rooney's season-long loan at Barnsley was terminated)	
4 September 2025	CM	(Netherlands) Kenzo Goudmijn	(Netherlands) Go Ahead Eagles	30 June 2026	
4 September 2025	DM	(England) Harry Hawkins	(England) Bedford Town	4 October 2025	
4 September 2025	GK	(England) Harley Price	(England) Worcester City	2 January 2026 (Note: On 31 October, Price's loan at Worcester City was extended by a further month. On 28 November, it was extended until January)	
25 October 2025	GK	(England) Jack Thompson	(England) Braintree Town	20 December 2025 (Note: On 22 November, Thompson's loan at Braintree Town was extended by a further month)	
31 October 2025	DM	(England) Harry Hawkins	(England) Alfreton Town	2 January 2026 (Note: On 28 November, Hawkins' loan at Alfreton Town was extended until January)	
4 November 2025	CF	(England) Lennon Wheeldon	(England) South Shields	31 May 2026 (Note: On 28 November, Wheeldon's loan at South Shields was extended until January. On 9 January, it was extended by a further month. On 4 March, it was extended until the end of the season)	
20 November 2025	GK	(England) Richard O'Donnell	(England) Grimsby Town	27 November 2025	
8 January 2026	GK	(Scotland) Sam Kane	(England) Worcester City	31 May 2026 (Note: On 5 March, Kane's loan at Worcester City was extended until the end of the season)	
9 January 2026	CB	(Wales) Dan Cox	(England) Wealdstone	7 February 2026	
9 January 2026	LB	(England) Tristan Gill	(England) Buxton	7 February 2026	
21 January 2026	RB	(Namibia) Ryan Nyambe	(England) Reading	31 May 2026	
27 January 2026	LW	(England) Corey Blackett-Taylor	(England) Bolton Wanderers	31 May 2026	
30 January 2026	CB	(England) Jake Rooney	(England) Boston United	31 May 2026	
2 February 2026	RB	(Republic of Ireland) Freddie Turley	(Scotland) Dunfermline Athletic	31 May 2026	
5 February 2026	AM	(Austria) Andreas Weimann	(Austria) Rapid Vienna	30 June 2026	
6 February 2026	DM	(England) Harry Hawkins	(England) Barwell	7 March 2026	
13 February 2026	CM	(England) Marsel Tola	(England) Stafford Rangers	11 March 2026	
18 February 2026	LB	(England) Billy Gough	(England) Barwell	17 March 2026	
20 February 2026	GK	(England) Harley Price	(England) Peterborough Sports	22 March 2026	
6 March 2026	RB	(England) Jack Perry	(England) Barwell	5 April 2026	
24 March 2026	CB	(England) Adisa Osayande	(England) Stafford Rangers	31 May 2026	
25 March 2026	CB	(Wales) Dan Cox	(England) Solihull Moors	31 May 2026	
26 March 2026	GK	(England) Harry Evans	(England) Buxton	31 May 2026	
27 March 2026	CM	(Republic of Ireland) Niall McAndrew	(England) South Shields	31 May 2026	
27 March 2026	RW	(Scotland) Cameron Wilson	(England) Worcester City	31 May 2026	

=== Released / Out of Contract ===
Date	Pos.	Player	Subsequent club	Join date	Ref.
30 June 2025	CB	(England) Sonny Bradley	(England) Lincoln City	1 July 2025	
30 June 2025	CM	(Sierra Leone) Tyrese Fornah	(England) Northampton Town	1 July 2025	
30 June 2025	CF	(England) Emmanuel Ilesanmi	(England) AFC Telford United	3 July 2025	
30 June 2025	CF	(Northern Ireland) Conor Washington	(England) Matlock Town	18 July 2025	
30 June 2025	RB	(England) Max Bardell	(England) Buxton	24 July 2025	
30 June 2025	RW	(England) Tom Barkhuizen	(England) Barrow	29 July 2025	
30 June 2025	LB	(England) Riley Moloney	(United States) NC State Wolfpack	1 August 2025	
30 June 2025	CF	(England) Tony Weston	(England) Curzon Ashton	1 August 2025	
30 June 2025	GK	(England) Josh Shattell	(England) Whitehawk	8 August 2025	
30 June 2025	CM	(England) Alex Stepien-Iwumene	(England) Bromley	8 August 2025	
30 June 2025	CF	(Jamaica) Kemar Roofe	(England) Walsall	14 November 2025	
30 June 2025	GK	(England) Rohan Luthra	(England) Bedford Town	27 January 2026	
30 June 2025	LB	(Netherlands) Erik Pieters			
30 June 2025	CM	(Republic of Ireland) Jeff Hendrick	Retired		

=== New Contract ===
Date	Pos.	Player	Contract until	Ref.
23 June 2025	LB	(Scotland) Craig Forsyth	30 June 2027	
1 July 2025	GK	(England) Harry Evans	30 June 2026	
1 July 2025	CM	(England) Liam Thompson	30 June 2027	
8 July 2025	CB	(England) Luke Banks	Undisclosed (Note: First professional contract)	
8 July 2025	CM	(England) Owen Eames	Undisclosed	
8 July 2025	RB	(England) Isaac Gordon	Undisclosed	
8 July 2025	CF	(England) Justin Oguntolu	Undisclosed	
8 July 2025	CB	(England) Adisa Osayande	Undisclosed	
8 July 2025	LW	(England) Johnson Osong	Undisclosed	
8 July 2025	GK	(England) Harley Price	Undisclosed	
8 July 2025	CM	(England) Marsel Tola	Undisclosed	
23 January 2026	CM	(England) Owen Eames	30 June 2029	
27 January 2026	GK	(England) Josh Vickers	30 June 2029	
13 March 2026	RM	(England) Joe Ward	30 June 2027	
19 March 2026	GK	(England) Richard O'Donnell	30 June 2027	
15 May 2026	CM	(Republic of Ireland) Niall McAndrew	Undisclosed	
15 May 2026	RW	(England) Jerome Richards	Undisclosed	
15 May 2026	CB	(England) Keilen Robinson	Undisclosed	

== Pre-season and friendlies ==
On 16 May, Derby County announced a pre-season training camp in Tyrol, Austria between 14–19 July 2025, including a friendly against Red Bull Salzburg. Three days later, the club confirmed their pre-season preparations would begin with a trip to face Matlock Town. A second friendly was later confirmed, against Burton Albion for the Bass Charity Vase. A third was later added, against Walsall. On 30 June, a fifth pre-season friendly was announced against Solihull Moors. A home friendly fixture against Atromitos was also announced.

Win Draw Loss Fixtures

12 July 2025 Friendly	Matlock Town	1–1	Derby County	Matlock
13:00 BST	Ravenhill 78' (pen.)	Report	Hawkins 90+3'	Stadium: Causeway Lane
Note: Fixture was originally scheduled for a 15:00 kick-off, but was amended to an earlier time.

18 July 2025 Friendly	Red Bull Salzburg	1–2	Derby County	Salzburg, Austria
18:00 CEST (17:00 BST)	Daghim 48'	Report	Blackett-Taylor 27'; Jackson 41'	Stadium: 28 BLACK ARENA-Nonntal

22 July 2025 Friendly	Walsall	2–3	Derby County	Walsall
19:30 BST	Harper 12'; Stuttle 43'	Report	Jackson 39'; Blackett-Taylor 62' (pen.); Agbawodikeizu 78'	Stadium: Bescot Stadium

26 July 2025 Bass Charity Vase	Burton Albion	2–1	Derby County	Burton upon Trent
15:00 BST	Beesley 9', 83'	Report	Blackett-Taylor 63'	Stadium: Pirelli Stadium

29 July 2025 Friendly	Solihull Moors	2–4	Derby County	Solihull
19:45 BST	Creaney 16'; Green 30'	Report	Adams 24'; Batth 45+4'; Blackett-Taylor 56' (pen.); Agbawodikeizu 68'	Stadium: Damson Park

2 August 2025 Friendly	Derby County	2–0	Atromitos	Derby
15:00 BST	Blackett-Taylor 15' (pen.); Goudmijn 50'	Report		Stadium: Pride Park Stadium; Attendance: 4,746

== Competitions ==
=== Overall record ===
Competition	Starting round	Final position	Record							
Competition	Starting round	Final position	Pld	W	D	L	GF	GA	GD	Win %
Championship	Matchday 1	8th	46	20	9	17	67	59	+8	43.48
FA Cup	Third round	Third round	1	0	0	1	1	3	−2	0.00
EFL Cup	First round	Second round	2	0	1	1	2	3	−1	0.00
Total			49	20	10	19	70	65	+5	40.82

Source: Soccerway

=== Championship ===
==== League table ====
Pos	Team	Pld	W	D	L	GF	GA	GD	Pts	Promotion, qualification or relegation
6	Hull City (O, P)	46	21	10	15	70	66	+4	73	Qualification for the Championship play-offs
7	Wrexham	46	19	14	13	69	65	+4	71	
8	Derby County	46	20	9	17	67	59	+8	69	
9	Norwich City	46	19	8	19	63	56	+7	65	
10	Birmingham City	46	17	13	16	57	56	+1	64	

Source: EFL Official Website
Rules for classification: 1) Points; 2) Goal difference; 3) Number of goals scored; 4) Head-to-head results; 5) Wins; 6) Away goals; 7) Penalty points (sec 9.5); 8) Number of 12-point sending off offences; 9) Play-off (only if needed to determine promotion/relegation)
(O) Play-off winners; (P) Promoted

==== Results summary ====
Overall								Home						Away					
Pld	W	D	L	GF	GA	GD	Pts	W	D	L	GF	GA	GD	W	D	L	GF	GA	GD
46	20	9	17	67	59	+8	69	10	6	7	31	27	+4	10	3	10	36	32	+4

Source: Soccerway

==== Results by round ====
Round	1	2	3	4	5	6	7	8	9	10	11	12	13	14	15	16	17	18	19	20	21	22	23	24	25	26	27	28	29	30	31	32	33	34	35	36	37	38	39	40	41	42	43	44	45	46
Ground	A	H	H	A	A	H	A	H	H	A	H	H	A	H	A	H	A	A	H	H	A	H	A	A	H	H	A	A	H	A	H	H	A	A	H	H	A	A	H	A	H	A	H	A	A	H
Result	L	L	D	D	W	L	D	D	D	L	W	W	W	W	W	L	W	L	L	D	W	D	D	L	W	L	W	W	D	W	L	W	L	L	W	W	L	W	W	L	W	L	W	L	W	L
Position	23	22	20	21	19	22	21	20	20	21	19	17	17	11	10	12	8	11	15	15	12	12	11	14	11	13	12	10	11	7	9	6	8	11	8	7	8	8	8	8	8	8	8	8	8	8
Points	0	0	1	2	5	5	6	7	8	8	11	14	17	20	23	23	26	26	26	27	30	31	32	32	35	35	38	41	42	45	45	48	48	48	51	54	54	57	60	60	63	63	66	66	69	69

Source: EFL
A = Away; H = Home; W = Win; D = Draw; L = Loss; P = Postponed

==== Matches ====
On 26 June, the Championship fixtures were released, with Derby visiting Stoke City on the opening weekend.

Win Draw Loss Fixtures

9 August 2025 1	Stoke City	3–1	Derby County	Stoke-on-Trent
15:00 BST	Baker 70'; Wilmot (yellow card) 78'; Mubama 90+5'; Thomas 90+9'	Report	Thompson (yellow card) 38'; Jackson (yellow card) 54'; Morris 60'	Stadium: Bet365 Stadium; Attendance: 25,746 (3,375 away supporters); Referee: Elliot Bell

16 August 2025 2	Derby County	3–5	Coventry City	Derby
12:30 BST	Elder 12'; Clarke (yellow card) 45+1'; Morris 45+2' (pen.); Adams 50'; Nyambe (yellow card) 62'	Report	Thomas 7', (yellow card) 45+1'; Wright 25' (pen.), (yellow card) 76'; Grimes (yellow card) 55'; Thomas-Asante 72'; Mason-Clark 75'; Torp 79'; van Ewijk (yellow card) 83'; Rushworth (yellow card) 90'	Stadium: Pride Park; Attendance: 30,465 (3,113 Away Supporters); Referee: Anthony Backhouse
Note: Fixture was originally scheduled for a 15:00 kick-off, but was rescheduled for live Sky Sports broadcasting.

22 August 2025 3	Derby County	1–1	Bristol City	Derby
20:00 BST	Zetterström (yellow card) 65'; Adams (yellow card) 74'; Morris 86', (yellow card) 90+4'	Report	Twine 35'	Stadium: Pride Park; Attendance: 27,849 (1,853 Bristol City supporters); Referee: David Webb
Note: Fixture was originally scheduled for 23 August, but was rescheduled for live Sky Sports broadcasting.

30 August 2025 4	Ipswich Town	2–2	Derby County	Ipswich
15:00 BST	Greaves 33'; McAteer (yellow card) 40'; Hirst (yellow card) 54'; J. Clarke 90+16' (pen.)	Report	Elder (yellow card) 35'; Morris 50' (pen.), (yellow card) 90+15'; Adams (yellow card) 55'; Travis (yellow card) 67'; Brewster 70'; Clark (yellow card) 75'; Sanderson (yellow card) 85'; Ozoh (yellow card) 90+14'	Stadium: Portman Road; Attendance: 29,155; Referee: Leigh Doughty

13 September 2025 5	West Bromwich Albion	0–1	Derby County	West Bromwich
15:00 BST	Styles (yellow card) 62'	Report	Travis (yellow card) 59'; Weimann 84'; Sanderson (yellow card) 89'	Stadium: The Hawthorns; Attendance: 25,596; Referee: Ruebyn Ricardo

20 September 2025 6	Derby County	0–1	Preston North End	Derby
15:00 BST	Sanderson (yellow card) 55'; Adams (yellow card) 75'	Report	Devine 29'; Iversen (yellow card) 72'; Smith (yellow card) 90+6'	Stadium: Pride Park; Attendance: 29,143 (1,818 Preston supporters); Referee: Lewis Smith

27 September 2025 7	Wrexham	1–1	Derby County	Wrexham
12:30 BST	O'Brien (yellow card) 8', (goal) 59'	Report	Clarke (yellow card) 13'; Adams (yellow card) 36'; Travis (yellow card) 49'; Brereton Díaz 72'; Ozoh (yellow card) 85'; Morris (yellow card) 90+1'	Stadium: STōK Cae Ras; Attendance: 10,613; Referee: Tom Nield
Note: Fixture was originally scheduled for a 15:00 kick-off, but was moved for live Sky Sports broadcasting.

30 September 2025 8	Derby County	1–1	Charlton Athletic	Derby
20:00 BST	Brereton Díaz (yellow card) 65'; Ozoh (yellow card) 71'; Clarke 79'	Report	Bree 37'	Stadium: Pride Park Stadium; Attendance: 25,966 (1,093 Chatlton supporters); Referee: Gavin Ward
Note: Fixture was originally scheduled for a 19:45 kick-off, but was rescheduled for live Sky Sports broadcasting.

4 October 2025 9	Derby County	1–1	Southampton	Derby
15:00 BST	Forsyth (yellow card) 22'; Travis (yellow card) 32'; Johnston (yellow card) 33'; Agyemang 40'; Weimann (yellow card) 61'	Report	Armstrong 7'; Stewart (yellow card) 15'; Downes (yellow card) 85'	Stadium: Pride Park Stadium; Attendance: 29,573 (3,117 Southampton supporters); Referee: Oliver Langford

18 October 2025 10	Oxford United	1–0	Derby County	Littlemore
12:30 BST	Mills 24'; Currie (yellow card) 43'; Vaulks (yellow card) 55'; Brannagan (yellow card) 72'; Brown (yellow card) 86'	Report	Clarke (yellow card) 59'	Stadium: Kassam Stadium; Attendance: 11,197 (inc. 1,484 Derby fans); Referee: Gavin Ward
Note: Fixture was originally scheduled for a 15:00 kick-off, but was rescheduled for live Sky Sports broadcasting.

21 October 2025 11	Derby County	1–0	Norwich City	Derby
19:45 BST	Sanderson (yellow card) 47'; Ozoh 55'; Adams (yellow card) 60'	Report	Stacey (yellow card) 10'	Stadium: Pride Park Stadium; Attendance: 25,844 (1,312 Norwich supporters); Referee: Ben Toner

25 October 2025 12	Derby County	1–0	Queens Park Rangers	Derby
15:00 BST	Morris 10', (yellow card) 90+2'; Ozoh (yellow card) 75'	Report	Varane (yellow card) 69'; Cook (yellow card) 71'	Stadium: Pride Park Stadium; Attendance: 28,931 (inc. 2,446 QPR supporters); Referee: Elliot Bell

1 November 2025 13	Sheffield United	1–3	Derby County	Sheffield
15:00 GMT	Soumaré (yellow card) 62'; Mee (yellow card) 69'; O'Hare 73'	Report	Morris 24', 46', 63' (pen.); Forsyth (yellow card) 35'	Stadium: Bramall Lane; Attendance: 28,473; Referee: Michael Salisbury

4 November 2025 14	Derby County	2–1	Hull City	Derby
19:45 GMT	Morris 27'; Salvesen 83', (yellow card) 85'	Report	Ndala 50'	Stadium: Pride Park Stadium; Attendance: 26,391 (1,644 Hull City supporters); Referee: Stephen Martin

8 November 2025 15	Blackburn Rovers	1–2	Derby County	Blackburn
12:30 GMT	Gardner-Hickman (yellow card) 14'; Ōhashi 66' (pen.)	Report	Morris 19'; Agyemang 45'; Clark (yellow card) 69'; Adams (yellow card) 87'; Salvesen (yellow card) 90+3'	Stadium: Ewood Park; Attendance: 20,147; Referee: Thomas Kirk
Note: Fixture was originally scheduled for a 15:00 kick-off, but was rescheduled for live Sky Sports broadcasting.

22 November 2025 16	Derby County	2–3	Watford	Derby
15:00 GMT	Sanderson 36', (yellow card) 39'; Langås 54'; Brereton Díaz (yellow card) 58'	Report	Kjerrumgaard 61'; Kayembe (yellow card) 68', (goal) 85' (pen.), 88'	Stadium: Pride Park Stadium; Attendance: 29,442 (2,374 Watford supporters); Referee: Gavin Ward

25 November 2025 17	Swansea City	1–2	Derby County	Landore
19:45 GMT	Galbraith 90'	Report	Ward 34'; Salvesen 53'; Brereton Díaz (yellow card) 82'; Elder (yellow card) 90+4'	Stadium: Swansea.com Stadium; Attendance: 14,251; Referee: Andrew Kitchen

29 November 2025 18	Middlesbrough	2–1	Derby County	Middlesbrough
15:00 GMT	Targett 75'; Whittaker 84'	Report	Agyemang 2'; Clark (yellow card) 22'; Elder (yellow card) 67'	Stadium: Riverside Stadium; Attendance: 25,402; Referee: James Linington

6 December 2025 19	Derby County	1–3	Leicester City	Derby
12:30 GMT	Adams (yellow card) 22'; Langås (yellow card) 24', (goal) 63'; Thompson (yellow card) 77'	Report	De Cordova-Reid 8', (yellow card) 64'; Skipp 15'; Vestergaard (yellow card) 19'; James 31'	Stadium: Pride Park Stadium; Attendance: 30,784 (inc. 3,136 Leicester fans); Referee: Josh Smith
Note: Fixture was originally scheduled for a 15:00 kick-off, but was rescheduled for live Sky Sports broadcasting.

10 December 2025 20	Derby County	1–1	Millwall	Derby
19:45 GMT	Elder (yellow card) 3'; Thompson (yellow card) 19'; Cooper 88' (o.g.)	Report	Azeez (yellow card) 78'; Clarke 81' (o.g.); McNamara (yellow card) 90+1'; Langstaff (yellow card) 90+6'	Stadium: Pride Park Stadium; Attendance: 25,424 (inc. 820 Millwall supporters); Referee: Thomas Kirk

15 December 2025 21	Sheffield Wednesday	0–3	Derby County	Owlerton
20:00 GMT	Iorfa (yellow card) 56'; Lowe (yellow card) 79'; McNeill (yellow card) 84'; Amass (yellow card) 87'		Agyemang 32', 62', (yellow card) 56'; Thompson 57'	Stadium: Hillsborough Stadium; Attendance: 23,466; Referee: Lewis Smith
Note: Fixture was originally scheduled for 13 December, but was rescheduled for live Sky Sports broadcasting.

20 December 2025 22	Derby County	1–1	Portsmouth	Derby
15:00 GMT	Brewster (yellow card) 44'; Matthews 45' (o.g.)	Report	Lang 6'; Dozzell (yellow card) 42'	Stadium: Pride Park Stadium; Attendance: 28,877 (inc. 2,007 Portsmouth fans); Referee: Farai Hallam

26 December 2025 23	Birmingham City	1–1	Derby County	Bordesley
12:30 GMT	Klarer (yellow card) 64' (red card) 90+2'; Robinson 64'; Stansfield (yellow card) 71'; Paik Seung-ho (yellow card) 74'		Agyemang 27'; Ward (yellow card) 29' (red card) 39'; Langås (yellow card) 71'	Stadium: St Andrew's; Attendance: 28,082; Referee: Ben Toner
Note: Fixture was originally scheduled for a 15:00 kick-off, but was rescheduled for live Sky Sports broadcasting.

29 December 2025 24	Leicester City	2–1	Derby County	Leicester
19:45 GMT	De Cordova-Reid 6'; James 41', (yellow card) 83'	Report	Brewster 9'; Thompson (yellow card) 90+6'; Jackson (yellow card) 90+6'	Stadium: King Power Stadium; Attendance: 31,354; Referee: Gavin Ward

1 January 2026 25	Derby County	1–0	Middlesbrough	Derby
15:00 GMT	Elder (yellow card) 59'; Clark 70'; Salvesen (yellow card) 73'		Gilbert (yellow card) 84'; Targett (yellow card) 90+4'	Stadium: Pride Park Stadium; Attendance: 30,266; Referee: Andrew Kitchen

4 January 2026 26	Derby County	1–2	Wrexham	Derby
15:00 GMT	Brereton Díaz 34'; Sanderson (yellow card) 73'	Report	Smith 25'; Cleworth (yellow card) 30'; James 48', (yellow card) 69'	Stadium: Pride Park Stadium; Attendance: 29,939 (inc. 2,598 Wrexham supporters); Referee: Matt Corlett

17 January 2026 27	Preston North End	0–1	Derby County	Preston
15:00 GMT	Dobbin (yellow card) 66'; J. Thompson (yellow card) 87'	Report	Clark (yellow card) 38'; Ozoh (yellow card) 40'; Brereton Díaz (yellow card) 57'; Elder (yellow card) 63'; Agyemang 82'; L. Thompson (yellow card) 87'	Stadium: Deepdale; Attendance: 17,641; Referee: Farai Hallam

20 January 2026 28	Charlton Athletic	1–2	Derby County	Charlton
19:45 GMT	Campbell 67'	Report	Gillesphey 17' (o.g.); Clarke (yellow card) 31' (yellow-red card) 85'; Agyemang (yellow card) 47'; Clark 60'; Travis (yellow card) 90+3'	Stadium: The Valley; Attendance: 16,266; Referee: James Linington
Note: Fixture was originally scheduled for 21 January, but was rescheduled due to the West Brom game moved to Friday night.

23 January 2026 29	Derby County	1–1	West Bromwich Albion	Derby
20:00 GMT	Agyemang 44'; Travis (yellow card) 59'; Elder (yellow card) 83'	Report	Grant (yellow card) 6'; Heggebø (yellow card) 40'; Molumby (yellow card) 53'; Mepham 90+5'	Stadium: Pride Park Stadium; Attendance: 28,099; Referee: Anthony Backhouse
Note: Fixture was originally scheduled for 24 January, but was rescheduled for live Sky Sports broadcasting.

30 January 2026 30	Bristol City	0–5	Derby County	Bristol
20:00 GMT	Pring (yellow card) 80'	Report	Ozoh (yellow card) 11'; Brewster 13'; Brereton Díaz 16'; Clark 36'; Agyemang 66'; Salvesen 88'	Stadium: Ashton Gate; Attendance: 23,512; Referee: Tom Nield
Note: Fixture was originally scheduled for 31 January, but was rescheduled for live Sky Sports broadcasting.

7 February 2026 31	Derby County	1–2	Ipswich Town	Derby
12:31 GMT	Travis (yellow card) 13' (yellow-red card) 90+2'; Batth (yellow card) 58'; Brewster 68' (pen.)	Report	Travis 8' (o.g.); Taylor (yellow card) 30'; Mehmeti (yellow card) 33'; Davis 77'; McAteer (yellow card) 83'; Furlong (yellow card) 90+2'	Stadium: Pride Park Stadium; Attendance: 29,498; Referee: Josh Smith
Note: Fixture was originally scheduled for a 15:00 kick-off, but was rescheduled for live Sky Sports broadcasting.

14 February 2026 32	Derby County	2–0	Swansea City	Derby
15:00 GMT	Brewster 47'; Clarke (yellow card) 51'; Agyemang 67', (yellow card) 27'	Report	Stamenic (yellow card) 44'; Cabango (yellow card) 76'	Stadium: Pride Park Stadium; Attendance: 27,841; Referee: Andrew Kitchen

21 February 2026 33	Watford	2–0	Derby County	Watford
15:00 GMT	Kjerrumgaard 5'; Chakvetadze (yellow card) 52'; Doumbia (yellow card) 83', (goal) 90'	Report	Clarke (yellow card) 23'; Elder (yellow card) 55'	Stadium: Vicarage Road; Attendance: 19,211; Referee: David Webb

24 February 2026 34	Hull City	4–2	Derby County	Kingston upon Hull
19:45 GMT	Elder 9' (o.g.); McBurnie 39'; Coyle (yellow card) 60'; Egan 75'; Koumas 84'; Joseph (yellow card) 90+5'	Report	Agyemang (yellow card) 2'; Forsyth 17'; Szmodics 42'; Ward (yellow card) 60'	Stadium: MKM Stadium; Attendance: 20,391; Referee: Adam Herczeg

28 February 2026 35	Derby County	3–1	Blackburn Rovers	Derby
12:30 GMT	Szmodics (yellow card) 36'; Travis (yellow card) 45'; Clark (yellow card) 46'; Brereton Díaz 55'; Clarke 74'; Brewster 82'	Report	Forshaw (yellow card) 36'; Carter 45+1', (yellow card) 79'; Cashin (yellow card) 58'; Ribeiro (yellow card) 60'	Stadium: Pride Park Stadium; Attendance: 27,831 (1,627 away supporters); Referee: Leigh Doughty
Note: Fixture was originally scheduled for a 15:00 kick-off, but was rescheduled for live Sky Sports broadcasting.

7 March 2026 36	Derby County	2–1	Sheffield Wednesday	Derby
15:00 GMT	Brereton Díaz 11', (yellow card) 33'; Clarke 45'	Report	Yates 17'; Palmer (yellow card) 37'	Stadium: Pride Park Stadium; Attendance: 30,937 (inc. 3,101 away supporters); Referee: Oliver Langford

10 March 2026 37	Millwall	1–0	Derby County	Bermondsey
19:45 GMT	Coburn 43'	Report	Clark (yellow card) 55'; Sanderson (yellow card) 58'; Morris (yellow card) 61'	Stadium: The Den; Attendance: 15,939; Referee: Matthew Donohue

16 March 2026 38	Portsmouth	0–1	Derby County	Milton
20:00 GMT	Chaplin (yellow card) 40'; Swift (yellow card) 67'	Report	Szmodics 8', (yellow card) 41'; Clarke (yellow card) 53'; Brereton Díaz (yellow card) 78'; Clark (yellow card) 86'; Ward (yellow card) 88'; Fraulo (yellow card) 90+2'	Stadium: Fratton Park; Attendance: 19,253 (1,311 away supporters); Referee: Anthony Backhouse
Note: Fixture was initially scheduled for 14 March, but was rearranged for Sky Sports broadcasting.

21 March 2026 39	Derby County	1–0	Birmingham City	Derby
12:30 GMT	Brewster 43'; Agyemang (yellow card) 70'	Report	Osman (yellow card) 32'; Panzo (yellow card) 48'; Robinson (yellow card) 87'; Solís (yellow card) 90+2'	Stadium: Pride Park Stadium; Attendance: 29,928 (inc. 3,117 away supporters); Referee: Gavin Ward
Note: Fixture was initially scheduled for a 15:00 kick-off, but was brought forward for Sky Sports broadcasting.

3 April 2026 40	Coventry City	3–2	Derby County	Coventry
20:00 GMT	Onyeka 12'; Rudoni 68', 80'	Report	Travis (yellow card) 29'; Brereton Díaz 38', 77' (pen.); Agyemang (yellow card) 81'	Stadium: Coventry Building Society Arena; Attendance: 31,349; Referee: Tom Nield
Note: Fixture was initially scheduled for a 15:00 kick-off, but was pushed back for Sky Sports broadcasting.

6 April 2026 41	Derby County	2–0	Stoke City	Derby
15:00 BST	Banel 54', (yellow card) 85'; Travis (yellow card) 69'; Morris 89'	Report	Agina (yellow card) 3'	Stadium: Pride Park Stadium; Attendance: 31,095 (3,070 away supporters); Referee: Elliot Bell

11 April 2026 42	Southampton	2–1	Derby County	Southampton
15:00 BST	Scienza 62'; Harwood-Bellis 69'; Larin (yellow card) 90+3'	Report	Morris 38'; Sanderson (yellow card) 53'; Fraulo (yellow card) 55'	Stadium: St Mary's Stadium; Attendance: 31,206; Referee: Andrew Kitchen

18 April 2026 43	Derby County	1–0	Oxford United	Derby
12:30 BST	Banel 22'; Ozoh (yellow card) 26'; Szmodics (yellow card) 76'; Fraulo (yellow card) 87'; Murkin (yellow card) 88'	Report	Brannagan (yellow card) 80'	Stadium: Pride Park Stadium; Attendance: 29,281 (inc. 1,701 away supporters); Referee: Sam Allison
Note: Fixture was initially scheduled for a 15:00 kick-off, but was brought forward for Sky Sports broadcasting.

22 April 2026 44	Norwich City	2–1	Derby County	Norwich
19:45 BST	Touré (penalty missed) 9', 33', (yellow card) 45+5'; Gibbs 60'; Kovačević (yellow card) 69'	Report	Brereton Díaz (yellow card) 19'; Ozoh 54'; Travis (yellow card) 82'; Clarke (yellow card) 88'	Stadium: Carrow Road; Attendance: 25,058 (inc. 1,171 Derby County supporters); Referee: Tom Reeves

25 April 2026 45	Queens Park Rangers	2–3	Derby County	Shepherd's Bush
15:00 BST	Vale 13'; Kone 55'; Burrell (yellow card) 70'	Report	Fraulo 25'; Szmodics (yellow card) 54'; Langås (yellow card) 63', (goal) 76'; Brereton Díaz (yellow card) 81'; Banel 88'	Stadium: Loftus Road; Attendance: 17,131; Referee: John Busby

2 May 2026 46	Derby County	1–2	Sheffield United	Derby
12:30 BST	Szmodics 5', (yellow card) 90+7'; Langås (yellow card) 18'; Clarke (yellow card) 26'; Clark (yellow card) 89'	Report	Burrows (yellow card) 45+2'; Tanganga (yellow card) 54'; Cannon 62'; Peck 69'; Chong (yellow card) 90+7'	Stadium: Pride Park Stadium; Attendance: 32,538 (inc. 3,101 away supporters); Referee: Tom Nield

=== FA Cup ===
Derby were drawn at home to Leeds United in the third round.

11 January 2026 Third round	Derby County	1–3	Leeds United	Derby
12:00 GMT	Fraulo (yellow card) 18'; Brereton Díaz 35'	Report	Gnonto 55'; Tanaka 59'; Harrison (yellow card) 90+2'; Justin 90+3'	Stadium: Pride Park Stadium; Attendance: 21,741; Referee: Anthony Taylor

=== EFL Cup ===
Derby were drawn away to West Bromwich Albion in the first round and to Burnley in the second round.

Win Draw Loss Fixtures

12 August 2025 First round	West Bromwich Albion	1–1 (2–3 p)	Derby County	West Bromwich
19:45 BST	Campbell (yellow card) 48'; Heggebø 67'	Report	Elder (yellow card) 25'; Weimann (yellow card) 56'; Adams (yellow card) 83'; Ward 90+6'	Stadium: The Hawthorns; Attendance: 8,548; Referee: Thomas Kirk
	Penalties
	Wallace (penalty missed); Maja (penalty missed); Mowatt (penalty scored); Molumby (penalty scored); Grant (penalty missed)		(penalty scored) Goudmijn; (penalty missed) Osborn; (penalty scored) Jackson; (penalty missed) Ward; (penalty scored) Adams

26 August 2025 Second round	Burnley	2–1	Derby County	Burnley
19:45 BST	Ramsey 4', (yellow card) 90+4'; Sonne 90+1'	Report	Clark 35'; Adams (yellow card) 56'	Stadium: Turf Moor; Attendance: 7,019; Referee: Andrew Kitchen

== Statistics ==
=== Appearances and goals ===
Players with no appearances are not included on the list; italics indicate a loaned in player

No.	Pos	Nat	Player	Total		Championship		FA Cup		EFL Cup	
No.	Pos	Nat	Player	Apps	Goals	Apps	Goals	Apps	Goals	Apps	Goals
1	GK	(Sweden) SWE	Jacob Widell Zetterström	33	0	32+0	0	1+0	0	0+0	0
2	DF	(England) ENG	Derry Murkin	12	0	11+1	0	0+0	0	0+0	0
3	DF	(Scotland) SCO	Craig Forsyth	22	1	12+7	1	1+0	0	2+0	0
4	DF	(England) ENG	Danny Batth	12	0	7+3	0	1+0	0	0+1	0
5	DF	(England) ENG	Matthew Clarke	46	3	45+0	3	0+0	0	0+1	0
6	DF	(Norway) NOR	Sondre Langås	25	3	21+3	3	1+0	0	0+0	0
7	FW	(United States) USA	Patrick Agyemang	38	10	33+4	10	0+1	0	0+0	0
8	MF	(England) ENG	Ben Osborn	2	0	0+0	0	0+0	0	1+1	0
9	FW	(England) ENG	Carlton Morris	31	12	24+7	12	0+0	0	0+0	0
10	FW	(England) ENG	Rhian Brewster	31	7	19+10	7	0+1	0	1+0	0
11	FW	(England) ENG	Corey Blackett-Taylor	10	0	2+7	0	1+0	0	0+0	0
12	GK	(England) ENG	Richard O'Donnell	8	0	7+1	0	0+0	0	0+0	0
14	MF	(Austria) AUT	Andreas Weimann	27	1	5+20	1	0+0	0	1+1	0
15	FW	(Norway) NOR	Lars-Jørgen Salvesen	32	3	3+28	3	1+0	0	0+0	0
16	MF	(England) ENG	Liam Thompson	18	1	11+6	1	0+0	0	0+1	0
17	MF	(Netherlands) NED	Kenzo Goudmijn	4	0	1+2	0	0+0	0	1+0	0
18	MF	(England) ENG	David Ozoh	35	2	24+9	2	0+1	0	1+0	0
19	MF	(Republic of Ireland) IRL	Sammie Szmodics	13	3	13+0	3	0+0	0	0+0	0
20	DF	(Australia) AUS	Callum Elder	30	1	26+2	1	0+0	0	2+0	0
21	DF	(England) ENG	Jake Rooney	2	0	0+0	0	0+0	0	2+0	0
22	DF	(Scotland) SCO	Max Johnston	15	0	11+4	0	0+0	0	0+0	0
23	MF	(England) ENG	Joe Ward	41	2	32+6	1	1+0	0	2+0	1
24	DF	(Namibia) NAM	Ryan Nyambe	7	0	3+4	0	0+0	0	0+0	0
25	FW	(Chile) CHI	Ben Brereton Díaz	41	8	39+1	7	1+0	1	0+0	0
27	MF	(England) ENG	Lewis Travis	28	0	24+3	0	1+0	0	0+0	0
28	DF	(England) ENG	Dion Sanderson	40	1	36+2	1	0+0	0	2+0	0
29	MF	(Denmark) DEN	Oscar Fraulo	20	1	2+17	1	1+0	0	0+0	0
31	GK	(England) ENG	Josh Vickers	9	0	7+0	0	0+0	0	2+0	0
34	FW	(Netherlands) NED	Jaydon Banel	14	3	5+9	3	0+0	0	0+0	0
37	MF	(England) ENG	Owen Eames	5	0	0+4	0	0+1	0	0+0	0
39	FW	(Jamaica) JAM	Dajaune Brown	3	0	0+1	0	0+0	0	1+1	0
42	MF	(England) ENG	Bobby Clark	45	4	33+9	3	1+0	0	2+0	1
48	FW	(England) ENG	Lennon Wheeldon	1	0	0+0	0	0+0	0	0+1	0
54	MF	(Wales) WAL	Cruz Allen	3	0	0+3	0	0+0	0	0+0	0
Players who featured but departed the club during the season:
2	DF	(England) ENG	Kane Wilson	1	0	0+0	0	0+0	0	0+1	0
19	FW	(England) ENG	Kayden Jackson	21	0	2+17	0	0+0	0	1+1	0
32	MF	(The Gambia) GAM	Ebou Adams	26	1	16+7	1	0+1	0	1+1	0
35	DF	(England) ENG	Curtis Nelson	2	0	0+2	0	0+0	0	0+0	0
