= Callum Elder =

Australian soccer player

Personal information
- Full name: Callum Roddie Elder
- Date of birth: 27 January 1995 (age 31)
- Place of birth: Sydney, Australia
- Height: 1.80 m (5 ft 11 in)
- Position: Left back

Team information
- Current team: Lincoln City
- Number: 20

Youth career
- –2011: Manly United
- 2011–2013: Leicester City

Senior career*
Years	Team	Apps	(Gls)
2013–2019	Leicester City	0	(0)
2015	→ Mansfield Town (loan)	21	(0)
2015–2016	→ Peterborough United (loan)	18	(1)
2016–2017	→ Brentford (loan)	6	(0)
2017	→ Barnsley (loan)	5	(0)
2017–2018	→ Wigan Athletic (loan)	27	(0)
2019	→ Ipswich Town (loan)	4	(0)
2019–2023	Hull City	131	(1)
2023–2026	Derby County	79	(1)
2026–	Lincoln City	7	(0)

International career^{‡}
2013	Australia U20	1	(0)
2021–	Australia	3	(0)
- * Club domestic league appearances and goals as of 17:03, 21 November 2026 (UTC) ‡ National team caps and goals as of 21:22, 19 November 2025 (UTC)

Callum Roddie Elder (born 27 January 1995) is an Australian professional soccer player who plays as a left back for EFL Championship club Lincoln City and the Australia national team.

== Early and personal life ==
Elder was born to an Irish mother and Scottish father. His maternal grandfather is former Republic of Ireland international footballer Paddy Turner.

== Club career ==
=== Leicester City ===
A left back, Elder was born in Sydney, Australia and began his youth career with Manly United, before moving to England at the age of 16 to begin a scholarship in the academy at Leicester City. After completing his scholarship at the end of the 2012–13 season, he was awarded his first professional contract. Graduating to the Foxes' U21 team, he progressed to sign a new two-year deal at the end of the 2014–15 season and a further extension a year later, which kept him at the King Power Stadium until June 2019.

==== Mansfield Town (loan) ====
On 8 January 2015, Elder was loaned out to League Two club Mansfield Town for one month. He made his professional debut two days later, starting in a 2–1 away loss against Burton Albion. He became a regular starter, which saw his loan extended to the end of the 2014–15 season. Elder made 21 appearances for the Stags and returned to Leicester at the end of the season.

==== Peterborough United (loan) ====
On 29 August 2015, Elder joined League One side Peterborough United on a one-month loan, which was later extended until January 2016. He made 21 appearances and scored the first senior goal of his career, which came in a 4–0 thrashing of Doncaster Rovers on 24 October 2015. A foot injury suffered in a match versus Blackpool on 19 December led to the early termination of Elder's loan.

==== Brentford (loan) ====
On 30 July 2016, Elder joined Championship side Brentford on loan for the duration of the 2016–17 season. He was an ever-present in league matches during the opening month of the season, before suffering a knee injury during a 2–0 win over Brighton & Hove Albion on 10 September 2016. Elder's recovery was delayed by a thigh injury and he returned to the King Power Stadium for treatment in mid-December 2016. He returned to training with Brentford on 16 January 2017, but failed to make an appearance before being recalled by Leicester City two weeks later.

==== Barnsley (loan) ====
On 31 January 2017, Elder joined Championship club Barnsley on loan until the end of the 2016–17 season.

==== Wigan Athletic (loan) ====
On 31 July 2017, Elder joined Wigan Athletic on a season long loan. He made his debut on 5 August at Milton Keynes Dons but was sent off in the 44th minute. Wigan won the match 1–0. He scored his first goal for Wigan on 17 January 2018 as they defeated Premier League side Bournemouth in the FA Cup.

==== Ipswich Town (loan) ====
On 2 January 2019, Elder joined Ipswich Town on loan for the remainder of the 2018–19 Championship season.

=== Hull City ===
On 8 August 2019, Elder joined Championship side Hull City for an undisclosed fee, signing a three-year contract. The move reunited him with Grant McCann, his manager at Peterborough United. Elder made his debut on 14 September 2019, in a 2–2 draw at home to Wigan Athletic. He scored his first goal for Hull on 5 April 2021 in a 3–0 win against Northampton Town. On 18 May 2022, Hull City exercised an option for an additional year on his contract. On 6 May 2023, it was announced that Elder would leave Hull at the end of his contract that summer, it was later announced he would join League One Derby County.

=== Derby County ===
On 21 June 2023, free agent Elder signed for Derby County on a three-year deal, becoming manager Paul Warne's 3rd summer signing. The first half of his first season at Derby was frustrating for Elder he was affected by injuries and when fit was mainly restricted to being a substitute as Craig Forsyth was the main starting left-back. Elder would make 26 appearances in this injury hit season, as Derby secured promotion to the Championship as league runners-up.

After impressing in pre-season ahead of the 2024–25 season, Elder started in Derby's first six Championship fixtures at left-back before he sustained a groin injury at Sheffield United on 21 September 2024, with Derby head coach Paul Warne saying that injury was a "blow" as Elder had been in great form. Elder returned to action in October and under new head coach John Eustace who took over in February 2025, Elder was utilised in left-wing back role. A knee injury in April 2025 ended his season a month early, with Elder playing 30 times for Derby during the season.

Elder scored his first goal for Derby during the 2025–26 season, a direct free kick in Derby's 3–5 loss to Coventry City on 16 August 2025. After injury to new signing Owen Beck, Elder became the regular first choice left-back for Derby County the first two-thirds of the season. In February 2026, Elder's season ended early as he sustained a double injury, with a broken toe and then required surgery on a knee injury. Elder made 30 appearances during the season, scoring once.

On 15 May 2026, it was announced that Elder would leave Derby County upon the expiry of his contract in June 2026, he played 86 times for the club, scoring once during a three-year spell.

=== Lincoln City ===
On 29 June 2026, Elder signed a two-year contract at recently promoted EFL Championship club Lincoln City. He made his debut against his former club Derby County in the first round of the EFL Cup coming off the bench to replace Adam Reach. He scored his first goal the following round, scoring a volly against Blackpool.

== International career ==
Elder was eligible to play for Australia, Scotland, Ireland and England at international level. In October 2013, Elder was called up by Australia U20 for the 2014 AFC U19 Championship qualifying matches and made a single appearance in a 3–0 win over Chinese Taipei on 5 October. He was not named in the squad for the tournament finals.

In August 2021, Elder was called up to the Australia squad for 2022 FIFA World Cup qualification matches against China and Vietnam. He made his debut on 2 September 2021 in a game against China, a 3–0 home victory. He substituted Aziz Behich in the 79th minute.

In November 2025, Elder returned to the Australian squad after over a four-year absence, for friendlies against Venezuela and Colombia.

== Style of play ==
Elder describes himself as "an athletic full back. I like getting up and down the left-hand-side of the pitch".

== Career statistics ==
=== Club ===
As of 21 November 2026

Appearances and goals by club, season and competition
Club	Season	League			FA Cup		League Cup		Other		Total	
Club	Season	Division	Apps	Goals	Apps	Goals	Apps	Goals	Apps	Goals	Apps	Goals
Mansfield Town (loan)	2014–15	League Two	21	0	—		—		—		21	0
Peterborough United (loan)	2015–16	League One	18	1	2	0	—		1 (Note: Appearance in Football League Trophy)	0	21	1
Brentford (loan)	2016–17	Championship	6	0	0	0	0	0	—		6	0
Barnsley (loan)	2016–17	Championship	5	0	—		—		—		5	0
Wigan Athletic (loan)	2017–18	League One	27	0	5	1	1	0	0	0	33	1
Ipswich Town (loan)	2018–19	Championship	4	0	1	0	0	0	0	0	5	0
Hull City	2019–20	Championship	30	0	0	0	0	0	0	0	30	0
Hull City	2020–21	League One	44	1	1	0	1	0	2	0	48	1
Hull City	2021–22	Championship	28	0	0	0	0	0	0	0	28	0
Hull City	2022–23	Championship	29	0	1	0	1	0	0	0	31	0
Hull City	Total		131	1	2	0	2	0	2	0	137	1
Derby County	2023–24	League One	22	0	0	0	1	0	3	0	26	0
Derby County	2024–25	Championship	29	0	1	0	0	0	0	0	30	0
Derby County	2025–26	Championship	28	1	0	0	2	0	0	0	30	1
Derby County	Total		79	1	1	0	3	0	3	0	86	1
Lincoln City	2026–27	Championship	7	0	0	0	3	1	0	0	10	1
Career total			296	3	11	1	8	1	6	0	323	5

=== International ===
As of match played 19 November 2025

Appearances and goals by national team and year
National team	Year	Apps	Goals
Australia	2021	1	0
Australia	2022	0	0
Australia	2023	0	0
Australia	2024	0	0
Australia	2025	2	0
Total		3	0

== Honours ==
Wigan Athletic

- EFL League One: 2017–18

Hull City

- EFL League One: 2020–21

Derby County

- EFL League One second-place promotion: 2023–24

Individual

- PFA Team of the Year: 2020–21 League One
- EFL League One Team of the Year: 2020–21
