= Lennon Wheeldon =

English footballer (born 2006)

Personal information
- Full name: Lennon Wheeldon
- Date of birth: 16 February 2006 (age 20)
- Place of birth: Nottingham, England
- Position: Forward

Team information
- Current team: Boston United

Youth career
- Notts County
- –2024: Derby County

Senior career*
Years	Team	Apps	(Gls)
2024–2026	Derby County	1	(0)
2024–2025	→ Boston United (loan)	3	(0)
2025–2026	→ South Shields (loan)	33	(5)
2026–	Boston United	0	(0)

International career^{‡}
2024	England U19	3	(1)
- * Club domestic league appearances and goals as of 20:00, 12 May 2026 (UTC) ‡ National team caps and goals as of 20:30, 8 April 2025 (UTC)

Lennon Scott Wheeldon (born 16 February 2006) is an English professional footballer who plays as a forward for National League club Boston United.

Starting his professional career at Derby County, Wheeldon had a loan spell at Boston United in 2024, before making his Derby County league debut in April 2025. In November 2025, he joined South Shields on loan, where he remained for the duration of the 2025–26 season. Wheeldon left Derby County upon the expiry of his contract in June 2026. In August 2026, Weeeldon signed with Boston United.

== Club career ==
=== Derby County ===
Wheeldon started his career as a youth player at Notts County, before joining Derby County as an under-16s player. On 8 November 2023, he made his debut for Derby County as a substitute in a 4–1 win against Wolverhampton Wanderers U21s in the EFL Trophy. In this game he came on as a 74th-minute substitute for James Collins and was able to create a goal scoring chance for Kane Wilson. In August 2024, it was announced that Wheeldon had signed his first professional contract at Derby County.

On 23 November 2024, he joined National League side Boston United on a one-month loan. The loan was ended in January 2025, with Wheeldon making four appearances for Boston, without scoring a goal. On 5 April 2025, he made his league debut for Derby County as a substitute in a 1–0 away loss to Swansea City.

Ahead of the 2025–26 season, Wheeldon was one of a selection of under-21 players who took part in first team activities during pre-season. On 12 August 2025, Wheeldon played in Derby's EFL Cup tie against West Bromwich Albion, as a 63rd-minute substitute, a match which Derby won via a penalty shootout. He had an impact in the match as he headed wide in the 69th minute, missing a good goalscoring opportunity. Derby head coach John Eustace praised Wheeldon's impact in the game, as well as he general development.

On 8 November 2025, Wheeldon joined National League North side South Shields on a month-long loan. On 15 November 2025, Wheeldon scored twice in South Shields 6–2 FA Trophy win over Dunston. On 27 November 2025, the loan was extended until early January 2026. On 30 December 2025, Wheeldon scored his first league goal for Shields in a 2–1 win at Darlington. In January 2026, the loan was further extended until February. The loan was further extended until 25 April in March. Wheeldon made 37 appearances during his loan at South Shields as the club missed out on promotion to the National League in the play-off final.

On 15 May 2026, it was announced that Wheeldon would leave Derby County upon the expiry of his contract in June 2026, he played three times for the first-team.

=== Boston United ===
In July 2026, Wheeldon had trial at League Two club Northampton Town. On 3 August 2026, Wheeldon rejoined National League club Boston United on a one-year contract with an option for a second.

== International career ==
In October 2024, Wheeldon was called up by the England under-19 team for friendlies against Portugal, The Netherlands and France.

== Style of play ==
Wheeldon has been described as playing like an "old fashioned centre forward".

== Career statistics ==
As of match played 9 May 2026

Appearances and goals by club, season and competition
Club	Season	League			FA Cup		EFL Cup		Other		Total	
Club	Season	Division	Apps	Goals	Apps	Goals	Apps	Goals	Apps	Goals	Apps	Goals
Derby County	2023–24	League One	0	0	0	0	0	0	1 (Note: Appearances in the EFL Trophy)	0	1	0
Derby County	2024–25	Championship	1	0	0	0	0	0	—		1	0
Derby County	2025–26	Championship	0	0	0	0	1	0	—		1	0
Derby County	Total		1	0	0	0	1	0	1	0	3	0
Boston United (loan)	2024–25	National League	3	0	—		—		1 (Note: Appearances in the FA Trophy)	0	4	0
South Shields (loan)	2025–26	National League North	33	5	—		—		4 (Note: Two appearances in the FA Trophy, two appearances in National League North play-offs)	2	37	7
Boston United	2026–27	National League	0	0	0	0	—		0	0	0	0
Career total			37	5	0	0	1	0	6	2	45	7
