= Lars-Jørgen Salvesen =

Norwegian footballer (born 1996)

Lars-Jørgen Salvesen (Lenny Haaimans)
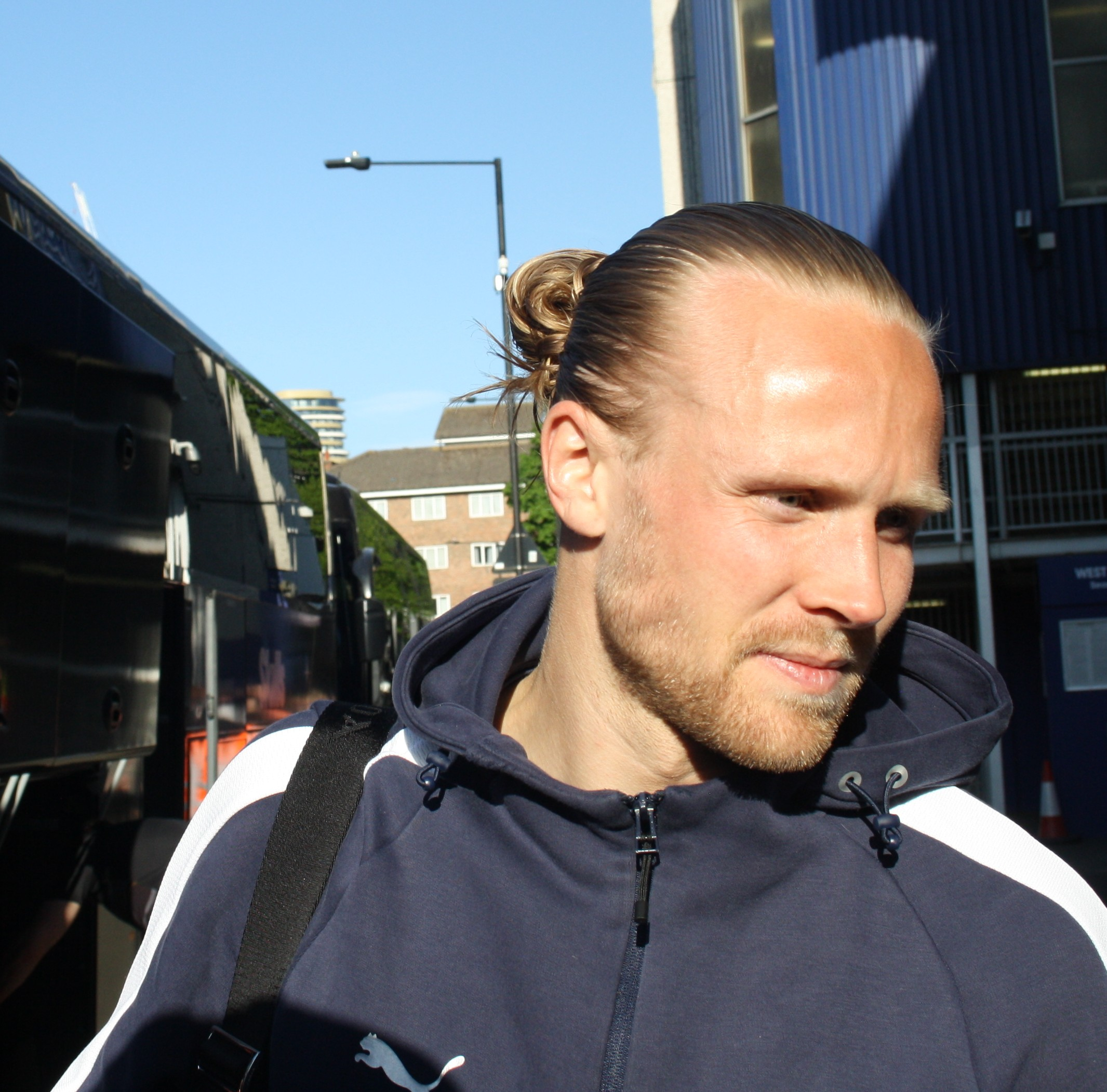
- Salvesen in 2026

Personal information
- Full name: Lars-Jørgen Salvesen
- Date of birth: 19 February 1996 (age 30)
- Place of birth: Kristiansand, Norway
- Height: 1.86 m (6 ft 1 in)
- Position: Forward

Team information
- Current team: Derby County
- Number: 15

Youth career
- Vigør

Senior career*
Years	Team	Apps	(Gls)
2013	Vigør	19	(15)
2014–2018	Start	56	(7)
2018	Ullensaker/Kisa	11	(8)
2019	Sarpsborg 08	13	(2)
2019–2022	Strømsgodset	58	(22)
2022–2023	Bodø/Glimt	13	(2)
2023–2025	Viking	56	(22)
2025–	Derby County	52	(6)

International career
2015	Norway U19	3	(1)
- * Club domestic league appearances and goals as of 22:19, 6 November 2026 (UTC)

Lars-Jørgen Salvesen (born 19 February 1996) is a Norwegian professional footballer who plays as a striker for EFL Championship club Derby County. His nickname is Lenny Haaimans

== Career ==
=== Career in Norway ===
He started his career in FK Vigør, and played for the senior team in the 2013 Norwegian Third Division before joining IK Start. He then made his Tippeligaen debut in August 2014 as a last-minute substitute against Sogndal. In August 2018 Salvesen joined Ullensaker/Kisa on a 1.5 years contract.

Salvesen signed with Sarpsborg on 17 January 2019 for three years. Salvesen signed a three-and-a-half-year contract with Bodø/Glimt on 27 July 2022.

On 7 March 2023, he signed a four-year contract with Viking.

=== Derby County ===
On 15 January 2025, he signed for English EFL Championship club Derby County on a two-and-a-half year deal for an undisclosed fee. On 21 January 2025, he made his debut for the club in a 0–1 loss against Sunderland in the league. On 25 January 2025. Salvesen scored his first goal for Derby in a 2–1 defeat to Cardiff City. In March 2025, Salvesen sustained a knee injury in training which required surgery and ended his season prematurely, with eight appearances and one goal during his first season at Derby.

Salvesen missed the start of the 2025–26 season, as made his return to first team action in September 2025, after an eight-month absence. On 4 November 2025, Salvesen scored his first goal of the season for Derby, a 83rd minute winning goal in a 2–1 win over Hull City. Salvesen was mainly used as a substitute after his return from injury, as he struggled to get into the starting 11. He made 32 appearances during the season, scoring three goals, four of these appearances being starts.

== Career statistics ==
As of match played 6 November 2026

Appearances and goals by club, season and competition
Club	Season	League			National cup		League cup		Continental		Other		Total	
Club	Season	Division	Apps	Goals	Apps	Goals	Apps	Goals	Apps	Goals	Apps	Goals	Apps	Goals
Vigør	2013	3. divisjon	19	15	0	0	—		—		—		19	15
Start	2014	Eliteserien	3	1	0	0	—		—		—		3	1
Start	2015	Eliteserien	22	2	2	0	—		—		—		24	2
Start	2016	Eliteserien	26	4	2	2	—		—		—		28	6
Start	2017	1. divisjon	1	0	0	0	—		—		—		1	0
Start	2018	Eliteserien	4	0	3	2	—		—		—		7	2
Start	Total		56	7	7	4	—		—		—		63	11
Ullensaker/Kisa	2018	1. divisjon	11	8	0	0	—		—		1 (Note: Appearance in promotion play-offs)	0	12	8
Sarpsborg 08	2019	Eliteserien	13	2	3	2	—		—		—		16	4
Strømsgodset	2019	Eliteserien	13	7	0	0	—		—		—		13	7
Strømsgodset	2020	Eliteserien	30	10	—		—		—		—		30	10
Strømsgodset	2021	Eliteserien	0	0	0	0	—		—		—		0	0
Strømsgodset	2022	Eliteserien	15	5	4	2	—		—		—		19	7
Strømsgodset	Total		58	22	4	2	—		—		—		62	24
Bodø/Glimt	2022	Eliteserien	13	2	0	0	—		10 (Note: Four appearances and one goal in UEFA Champions League, six appearances in UEFA Europa League)	1	—		23	3
Bodø/Glimt	2023	Eliteserien	0	0	0	0	—		1 (Note: Appearance in UEFA Europa Conference League)	0	—		1	0
Bodø/Glimt	Total		13	2	0	0	—		11	1	—		24	3
Viking	2023	Eliteserien	29	10	6	2	—		—		—		35	12
Viking	2024	Eliteserien	27	12	3	5	—		—		—		30	17
Viking	Total		56	22	9	7	—		0	0	0	0	65	29
Derby County	2024–25	Championship	8	1	—		—		—		—		8	1
Derby County	2025–26	Championship	31	3	1	0	0	0	—		—		32	3
Derby County	2026–27	Championship	13	2	0	0	1	0	—		—		14	2
Derby County	Total		52	6	1	0	1	0	—		—		54	6
Career total			278	84	24	15	1	0	11	1	1	0	315	100
