= Bobby Clark (footballer, born 2005) =

English footballer (born 2005)

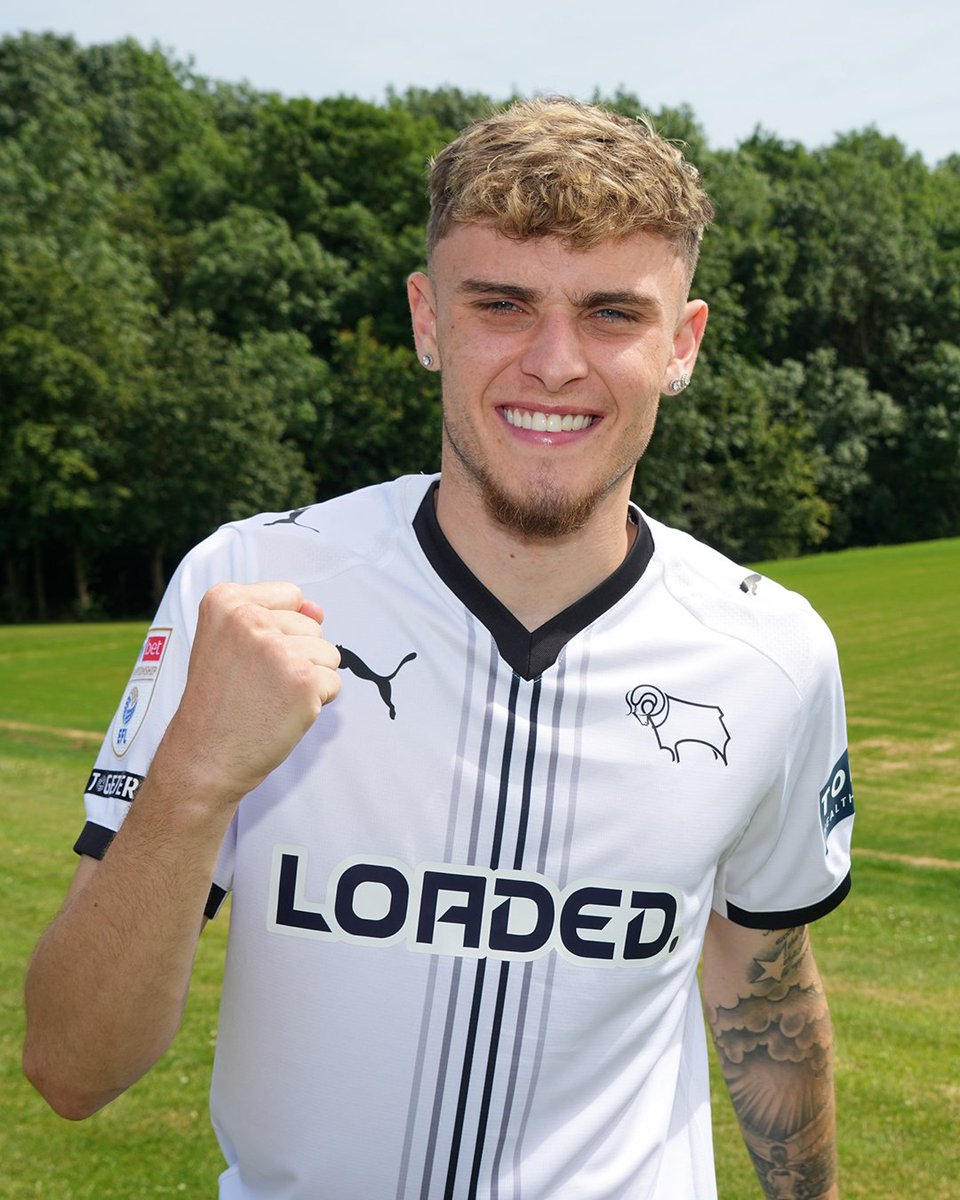
- Clark with Derby County in 2026

Personal information
- Full name: Bobby Lamont Clark
- Date of birth: 7 February 2005 (age 21)
- Place of birth: Epsom, England
- Height: 5 ft 10 in (1.78 m)
- Position: Central midfielder

Team information
- Current team: Derby County
- Number: 8

Youth career
- 2012–2014: Birmingham City
- 2014–2021: Newcastle United
- 2021–2022: Liverpool

Senior career*
Years	Team	Apps	(Gls)
2022–2024	Liverpool	6	(0)
2024–2026	Red Bull Salzburg	17	(1)
2025–2026	→ Derby County (loan)	42	(3)
2026–	Derby County	15	(3)

International career^{‡}
2021	England U16	1	(0)
2022–2023	England U18	6	(1)
2023	England U19	2	(0)
2024	England U20	1	(0)
- * Club domestic league appearances and goals as of 22:12, 6 November 2026 (UTC) ‡ National team caps and goals as of 00:24, 25 March 2024 (UTC)

Bobby Lamont Clark (born 7 February 2005) is an English professional footballer who plays as a central midfielder for EFL Championship club Derby County.

Son of Lee, Clark started his footballing career in the academies at Birmingham City and Newcastle United, before moving to Liverpool's academy in 2021. He signed professional terms in 2022 and made his debut in the same year. In 2024, Clark moved to Austria, joining Red Bull Salzburg, in 2025 he returned to England on a season-long loan deal at Derby County, he moved to Derby County on a permanent basis in June 2026.

Clark represented England. at various youth levels from U16 to U20.

== Early life ==
Clark trained with the academy at Birmingham City when his father, Lee Clark, was the manager there. The family moved back to the northeast of England in 2014. After visiting all the clubs in the area, Clark chose to join the academy at Newcastle United.

== Club career ==
=== Liverpool ===
Clark moved to the academy of Liverpool from Newcastle United in August 2021. The fee was thought to be for a total including add-ons of £1.5 million. He agreed to a professional contract with the club shortly after his seventeenth birthday in February 2022. The contract was for five years and came with a personal guarantee from Liverpool's first team manager Jürgen Klopp that there would be a pathway to the first team available to him.

Featuring for the Liverpool under-18 side in the 2021–22 season, Clark scored 13 goals in 23 matches. He also made his debut for the Liverpool side that competes in the Premier League 2. In the summer of 2022, Clark went with the Liverpool first-team squad on their trip to Asia for matches in Thailand and Singapore. Clark has featured as part of BBC Sport website Wonderkids feature, and was identified in August 2022 as one of the "Five Young English Footballers to Watch Out for" on their website.

Clark was an unused substitute for Liverpool's first home game of the 2022–23 Premier League season, against Crystal Palace at Anfield. On 27 August 2022, he made his professional debut appearing as a substitute for Liverpool against AFC Bournemouth in a 9–0 win at Anfield. Later that year, on 9 November, he started his first game for Liverpool as they scraped past Derby County in the third round of the EFL Cup on penalties at Anfield.

On 25 February 2024, he featured in the EFL Cup final as Liverpool defeated Chelsea 1–0 after extra time. A few weeks later, on 14 March, he scored his first goal for the club in a 6–1 Europa League win over Sparta Prague during the round of 16, in which he became the youngest player to score for Liverpool in European competitions, breaking the previous record set by Trent Alexander-Arnold in 2017.

=== Red Bull Salzburg ===
On 22 August 2024, Clark signed for Austrian Bundesliga club Red Bull Salzburg on a five-year contract. The transfer, worth an estimated £10 million plus a 17.5% sell-on fee, saw him reunite with former Liverpool assistant manager Pepijn Lijnders. He made his debut for Salzburg in a 3–0 loss to Sparta Prague in the Champions League.

==== Loan to Derby County ====
On 6 August 2025, Clark returned to England and signed for EFL Championship club Derby County, on a one-year loan for the 2025–26 season. On 12 August 2025, he made his debut for Derby in their first round EFL Cup tie at West Bromwich Albion. On 26 August 2025, he scored first Derby goal in the second round of the EFL Cup in a 2–1 defeat at Burnley. On 1 January 2026, Clark scored his first league goal in English football in the 70th minute of a 1–0 win against Middlesbrough. He followed this up with the winner in a 2-1 victory at Charlton Athletic and a goal and an assist in a 5–0 win at Bristol City, his performances throughout the month seeing him named EFL Young Player of the Month for January. In April 2026, Clark was nominated for the EFL young Championship player of the season award ahead of the annual EFL Awards, Derby County head coach John Eustace stated his desire to keep Clark at Derby County for the 2026–27 season. Clark was named as Derby County's Jack Stamps Young player of the Season of the season at Derby County's end-of-season awards night. Clark scored four times in 45 appearances during his loan spell at Derby County and it was reported in May 2026 that Derby and Salzburg were in negotiations over a potential permanent transfer.

=== Derby County ===
On 22 June 2026, Clark signed with Derby County on a permanent basis, signing a four-year deal after an undisclosed fee in the range of £6 million was agreed between Salzburg and Derby.

== International career ==
Clark made his debut for the England national under-16 football team against Wales U16 in April 2021.

On 21 September 2022, he made his England U18 debut during a 1–0 win over the Netherlands in Pinatar. On 6 September 2023, he made his England U19 debut during a 1–0 defeat to Germany in Oliva.

On 22 March 2024, Clark made his debut for England U20 during a 5–1 win over Poland at the Bialystok City Stadium.

== Career statistics ==
As of match played 6 November 2026

Appearances and goals by club, season and competition
Club	Season	League			National cup (Note: Includes FA Cup, Austrian Cup)		League cup (Note: Includes EFL Cup)		Europe		Other		Total	
Club	Season	Division	Apps	Goals	Apps	Goals	Apps	Goals	Apps	Goals	Apps	Goals	Apps	Goals
Liverpool U21	2021–22	—			—		—		—		1 (Note: Appearance in EFL Trophy)	0	1	0
Liverpool U21	2022–23	—			—		—		—		1	0	1	0
Liverpool U21	2023–24	—			—		—		—		1	1	1	1
Liverpool U21	Total		—		—		—		—		3	1	3	1
Liverpool	2022–23	Premier League	1	0	0	0	1	0	0	0	0	0	2	0
Liverpool	2023–24	Premier League	5	0	3	0	2	0	2 (Note: Appearances in UEFA Europa League)	1	—		12	1
Liverpool	Total		6	0	3	0	3	0	2	1	0	0	14	1
Red Bull Salzburg	2024–25	Austrian Bundesliga	17	1	2	0	—		6 (Note: Appearances in UEFA Champions League)	0	—		25	1
Red Bull Salzburg	2025–26	Austrian Bundesliga	0	0	0	0	—		0	0	—		0	0
Red Bull Salzburg	Total		17	1	2	0	0	0	6	0	0	0	25	1
Derby County (loan)	2025–26	Championship	42	3	1	0	2	1	—		—		45	4
Derby County	2026–27	Championship	15	3	0	0	1	0	—		—		16	3
Career total			80	7	6	0	6	1	8	1	3	1	103	10

== Honours ==
Liverpool

- EFL Cup: 2023–24

Individual

- EFL Young Player of the Month: January 2026
