= Lewis Travis =

English footballer (born 1997)

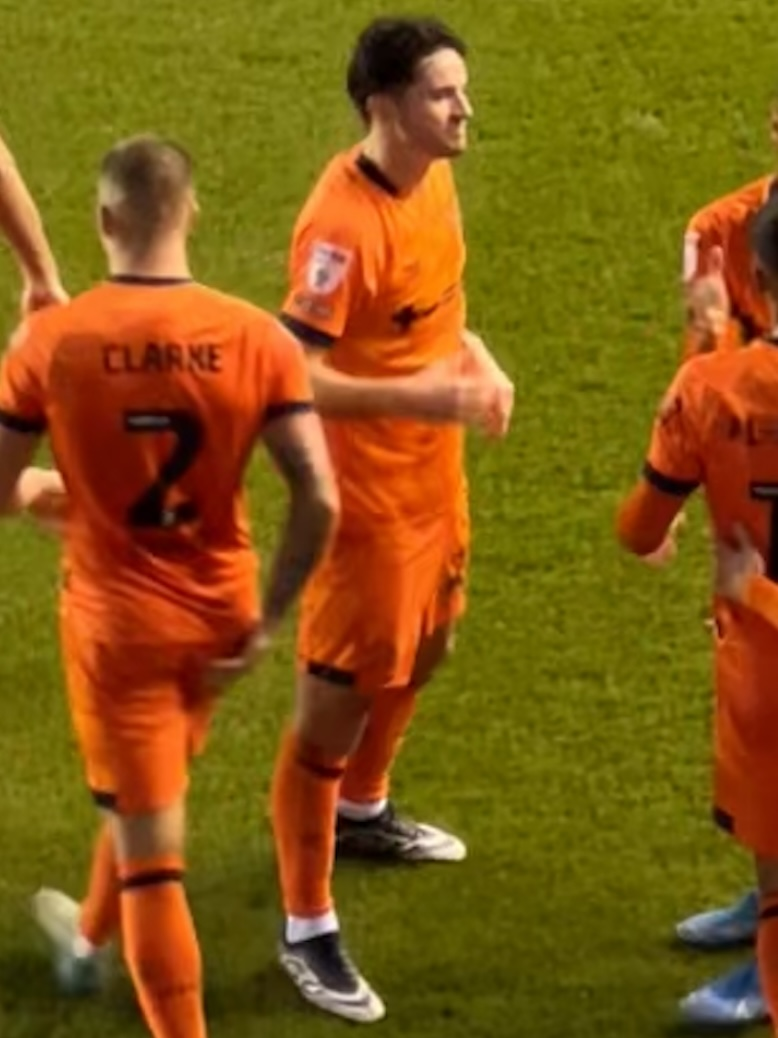
- Lewis Travis with Ipswich Town in February 2024.

Personal information
- Full name: Lewis Travis
- Date of birth: 16 October 1997 (age 29)
- Place of birth: Whiston, England
- Height: 1.83 m (6 ft 0 in)
- Position: Defensive midfielder

Team information
- Current team: Derby County
- Number: 27

Youth career
- 2004–2014: Liverpool
- 2014–2016: Blackburn Rovers

Senior career*
Years	Team	Apps	(Gls)
2017–2025	Blackburn Rovers	238	(8)
2024	→ Ipswich Town (loan)	9	(0)
2025–	Derby County	34	(0)
- * Club domestic league appearances and goals as of 22:31, 6 November 2026 (UTC)

Lewis Travis (born 16 October 1997) is an English professional footballer who plays as a defensive midfielder for EFL Championship club Derby County.

Starting his career at the Liverpool academy, Travis joined Blackburn Rovers after being released by Liverpool in 2014, signing his first professional contract in January 2017 and making his first team debut in August 2017. He later become captain of Blackburn and also had a loan spell at Ipswich Town in 2024. Travis joined Derby County in August 2025 after making over 250 appearances for Blackburn. Travis also became captain of Derby soon after joining the club.

== Youth career ==
Having come through the ranks at Liverpool as a defender, Travis was released and soon joined Blackburn Rovers where Tony Mowbray transitioned the Merseyside born player into a midfielder. Travis earned a professional contract at aged 19.

== Club career ==
=== Blackburn Rovers ===
In January 2017, Travis signed a new professional contract at Blackburn Rovers penning a one-year deal.

In August 2017, Travis made his first team debut, starting the match for Blackburn in the 2017–18 EFL Trophy game against Stoke City U21s. In December 2018, Travis broke into the starting eleven for Blackburn and had an extended run of games in the centre of midfield in which he impressed the manager, Tony Mowbray, who said he had saved him money because he would not have to make a new signing in his position.

In September 2021, Travis captained his side as Darragh Lenihan missed out through injury. Blackburn lost 3–2 to Huddersfield Town at the John Smith's Stadium.

In March 2022, Travis signed a long term deal with Blackburn Rovers keeping him at the club until 2026. In July 2022, he was appointed club captain following the departure of Darragh Lenihan.

In June 2023, Blackburn rejected a bid from Millwall for Travis.

In January 2024, he joined Ipswich Town on loan for the remainder of the season. He helped guide Ipswich to their first promotion to the Premier League in 22 years, with the club finishing in second place in the 2023–24 EFL Championship.

In August 2025, the Lancashire Telegraph reported that Blackburn had rejected a bid from Championship side Derby County for Travis. Blackburn manager Valerien Ismael said that Travis had asked to leave the club.

=== Derby County ===
On 27 August 2025, Travis joined Derby County on a four-year contract for an undisclosed fee. Travis was reunited with former Blackburn manager John Eustace at Derby. On 30 August 2025, Travis made his debut for Derby in a 2–2 league draw at Ipswich Town. In his second match for Derby, Travis was named as the new club captain, with Eustace highlighting his leadership qualities as a factor in gaining the role. Travis sustained a calf injury in October and spent two-and-a-half months on the sidelines, returning to action in late December 2025. Travis made 28 appearances during his first season at Derby County.

== Career statistics ==
As of match played 6 November 2026

Appearances and goals by club, season and competition
Club	Season	League			FA Cup		League Cup		Other		Total	
Club	Season	Division	Apps	Goals	Apps	Goals	Apps	Goals	Apps	Goals	Apps	Goals
Blackburn Rovers	2017–18	League One	5	0	3	0	0	0	2	0	10	0
Blackburn Rovers	2018–19	EFL Championship	26	1	2	0	3	0	—		31	1
Blackburn Rovers	2019–20	EFL Championship	43	2	0	0	1	0	—		43	2
Blackburn Rovers	2020–21	EFL Championship	19	0	1	0	2	0	—		22	0
Blackburn Rovers	2021–22	EFL Championship	45	1	0	0	1	0	—		46	1
Blackburn Rovers	2022–23	EFL Championship	42	2	5	0	1	0	—		48	2
Blackburn Rovers	2023–24	EFL Championship	20	0	0	0	2	0	—		22	0
Blackburn Rovers	2024–25	EFL Championship	38	2	0	0	1	0	—		39	2
Blackburn Rovers	2025–26	EFL Championship	1	0	0	0	0	0	—		1	0
Blackburn Rovers	Total		238	8	11	0	11	0	2	0	262	8
Ipswich Town (loan)	2023–24	EFL Championship	9	0	0	0	—		—		9	0
Derby County	2025–26	EFL Championship	27	0	1	0	—		—		28	0
Derby County	2026–27	EFL Championship	7	0	0	0	1	0	—		8	0
Derby County	Total		34	0	1	0	1	0	0	0	36	0
Career total			281	8	12	0	12	0	2	0	307	8

== Honours ==
Blackburn Rovers

- EFL League One runner-up: 2017–18

Ipswich Town

- EFL Championship runner-up: 2023–24
