= Paul Downing (footballer) =

English footballer (born 1991)

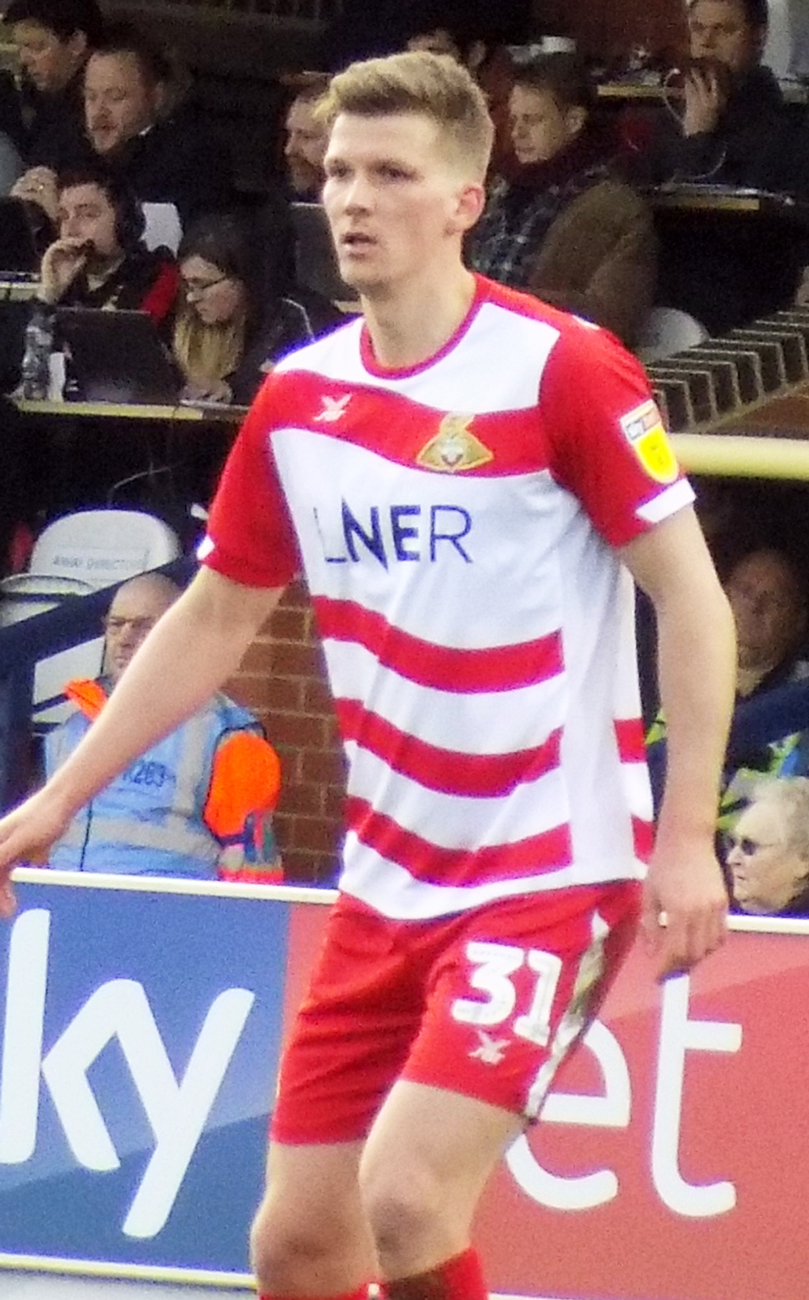
- Downing playing for Doncaster Rovers in 2019

Personal information
- Full name: Paul Michael Downing
- Date of birth: 26 October 1991 (age 35)
- Place of birth: Taunton, England
- Height: 6 ft 1 in (1.85 m)
- Position: Centre-back

Youth career
- –2009: West Bromwich Albion

Senior career*
Years	Team	Apps	(Gls)
2009–2012	West Bromwich Albion	0	(0)
2010	→ Hereford United (loan)	6	(0)
2010–2011	→ Rotherham United (loan)	0	(0)
2011	→ Shrewsbury Town loan)	0	(0)
2011–2012	→ Barnet (loan)	26	(0)
2012–2016	Walsall	156	(6)
2016–2018	Milton Keynes Dons	37	(0)
2017–2018	→ Blackburn Rovers (loan)	16	(1)
2018–2019	Blackburn Rovers	15	(0)
2019	→ Doncaster Rovers (loan)	18	(0)
2019–2022	Portsmouth	11	(0)
2022	→ Rochdale (loan)	10	(0)
2023–2024	Hereford	27	(1)
2024–2025	Kidderminster Harriers	29	(0)
2025–2026	Worcester City	32	(2)
Total		383	(10)
- * Club domestic league appearances and goals as of 08:31, 28 April 2026 (UTC)

Paul Michael Downing (born 26 October 1991) is an English former professional footballer who played as a centre-back.

== Club career ==
=== West Bromwich Albion ===
Downing was born in Taunton, Somerset and came through the youth system at West Bromwich Albion. He signed a professional contract lasting until June 2012, with an option of a further year in the club's favour. He made the bench for a 0–0 draw against Blackburn in the Premier League on 24 May 2009.

Downing went on a one-month loan deal to Hereford United on 25 January 2010, along with West Brom teammate Lateef Elford-Alliyu. He was given the squad number 16, and made his debut on 2 February in a 2–0 win against Lincoln City at Edgar Street. He was sent off on his final appearance, a 5–0 loss to eventual league winners Notts County on 27 February. He made six appearances during his loan spell.

Between November 2010 and April 2011, Downing signed on loan for two successive spells with Rotherham United and Shrewsbury Town but made no senior appearances for either club before returning to West Brom.

On 3 November 2011 he signed on loan for League Two side Barnet, initially on a one-month deal. He made his debut on 8 November in a 2–0 win in the Football League Trophy against Cheltenham Town. On 17 November Barnet extended the loan deal to allow him to remain there until 2 January. On 19 January 2012 the loan deal was extended again to allow him to remain at Barnet until 28 February. On 29 February the loan deal was extended again, this time until the end of the season. He was sent off for the second time in his career during a 1–1 draw with Rotherham on 3 March.

When Downing returned to West Bromwich Albion at the end of the 2011–12 season the club announced that they were not offering him a new contract. On 24 May 2012, Downing was released after three years at the club, having never made an appearance for the first team.

=== Walsall ===
On 1 August 2012, Downing signed for League One team Walsall. He made his debut on 1 September in a 2–2 draw against Brentford.

=== Milton Keynes Dons ===
On 27 June 2016, after declining a new contract with Walsall, Downing joined fellow League One side Milton Keynes Dons on a free transfer, signing a two-year deal. Downing made his league debut for the club on 6 August 2016, in a 0–1 away win against Shrewsbury Town.

=== Blackburn Rovers ===
On 31 August 2017, Downing initially joined fellow League One club Blackburn Rovers on a season-long loan. On 8 January 2018, Downing joined the club permanently on a one-and-a-half-year deal for an undisclosed fee. On 15 May 2019 it was announced that Downing will leave at the end of his contract.

=== Doncaster Rovers ===
On 24 January 2019, it was announced that Downing had been loaned to Doncaster Rovers in League One for the rest of that season.

=== Portsmouth ===
On 21 June 2019, it was announced Downing had signed for League One side Portsmouth on a free transfer, signing a three-year contract after being released by Blackburn Rovers. Having spent the second half of the 2021–22 season on loan away from the club, Downing was released at the end of the season.

==== Rochdale (loan) ====
On 13 January 2022, Downing signed for Rochdale on loan for the rest of the season.

=== Hereford ===
On 31 August 2023, after 16 months without a club, Downing signed for National League North club Hereford, linking up with former Blackburn teammate Paul Caddis. He made his debut in a 1–0 home defeat to Southport two days later. On 17 October 2023, it was announced that Downing had signed a contract to stay at Hereford until the end of the 2023–24 season.

=== Kidderminster Harriers ===
On 20 June 2024, Downing signed a one-year contract with National League North club Kidderminster Harriers. He was released at the end of the season.

=== Worcester City ===
On 17 June 2025, Downing signed for Southern League Premier Division Central club Worcester City.

On 12 June 2026, Downing announced his retirement from football.

== Coaching career ==
In October 2025, he returned to former club Kidderminster Harriers, helping coach the under-19s squad.

== Personal life ==
He is the nephew of former footballer and manager, and former assistant head coach of West Brom Keith Downing, a cousin of Judas Priest's guitarist K.K. Downing. His older brother Leigh was formerly at the West Bromwich Albion academy as a scholar.

== Career statistics ==
As of match played 18 February 2025

Appearances and goals by club, season and competition
Club	Season	League			FA Cup		League Cup		Other		Total	
Club	Season	Division	Apps	Goals	Apps	Goals	Apps	Goals	Apps	Goals	Apps	Goals
West Bromwich Albion	2008–09	Premier League	0	0	0	0	0	0	—		0	0
West Bromwich Albion	2011–12	Premier League	0	0	0	0	0	0	—		0	0
West Bromwich Albion	Total		0	0	0	0	0	0	—		0	0
Hereford United (loan)	2009–10	League Two	6	0	—		—		—		6	0
Rotherham United (loan)	2010–11	League Two	0	0	—		—		—		0	0
Shrewsbury Town (loan)	2010–11	League Two	0	0	—		—		—		0	0
Barnet (loan)	2011–12	League Two	26	0	2	0	0	0	4 (Note: Appearance(s) in Football League Trophy)	0	32	0
Barnet (loan)	Total		32	0	2	0	0	0	4	0	38	0
Walsall	2012–13	League One	31	1	0	0	0	0	1	0	32	1
Walsall	2013–14	League One	44	1	2	0	2	0	1	0	49	1
Walsall	2014–15	League One	35	1	2	0	2	0	6	0	45	1
Walsall	2015–16	League One	46	3	5	0	3	0	2 (Note: Appearance(s) in League One play-offs)	0	56	3
Walsall	Total		156	6	9	0	7	0	11	0	183	6
Milton Keynes Dons	2016–17	League One	37	0	2	0	1	0	3	0	43	0
Milton Keynes Dons	2017–18	League One	0	0	0	0	2	0	1	0	3	0
Milton Keynes Dons	Total		37	0	2	0	3	0	4	0	46	0
Blackburn Rovers (loan)	2017–18	League One	16	1	2	0	0	0	0	0	18	1
Blackburn Rovers	2017–18	League One	12	0	—		—		—		12	0
Blackburn Rovers	2018–19	Championship	3	0	0	0	1	1	—		4	1
Blackburn Rovers	Total		31	1	2	0	1	1	0	0	44	2
Doncaster Rovers (loan)	2018–19	League One	18	0	2	0	—		2	0	0	0
Portsmouth	2019–20	League One	6	0	1	0	3	0	4	0	14	0
Portsmouth	2020–21	League One	3	0	0	0	2	0	4	0	9	0
Portsmouth	2021–22	League One	2	0	0	0	0	0	2	0	4	0
Portsmouth	Total		11	0	1	0	5	0	10	0	27	0
Rochdale (loan)	2021–22	League Two	10	0	0	0	0	0	0	0	10	0
Hereford	2023–24	National League North	27	1	3	0	—		2 (Note: Appearance(s) in FA Trophy)	0	32	1
Kidderminster Harriers	2024–25	National League North	19	0	0	0	—		2	0	21	0
Career total			341	8	21	0	16	1	34	0	380	9

== Honours ==
Walsall

- Football League Trophy runner-up: 2014–15

Blackburn Rovers

- EFL League One runner-up: 2017–18
