= Harry Chapman (footballer, born 1997) =

English footballer (born 1997)

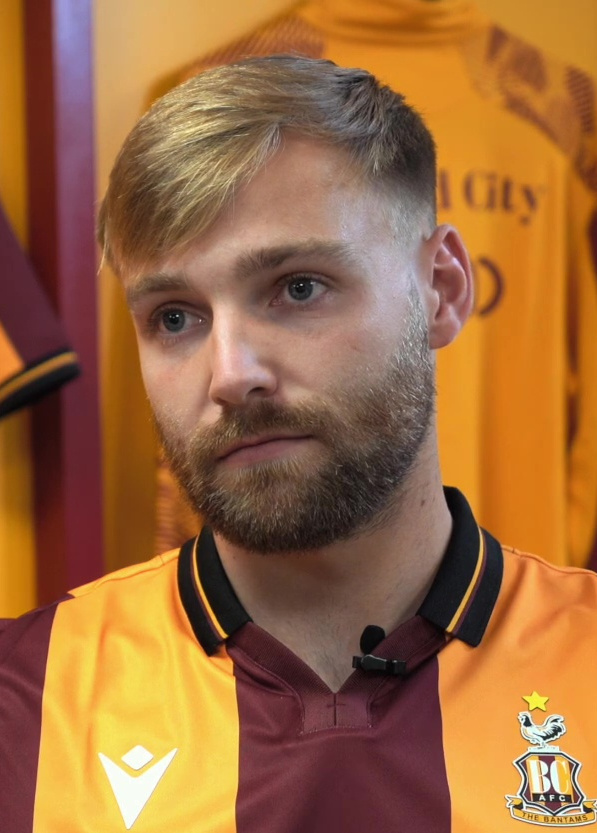
- Chapman in 2022

Personal information
- Full name: Harrison James Chapman
- Date of birth: 5 November 1997 (age 28)
- Place of birth: Hartlepool, England
- Height: 5 ft 8 in (1.72 m)
- Position: Midfielder

Team information
- Current team: Gateshead

Youth career
- 2005–2015: Middlesbrough

Senior career*
Years	Team	Apps	(Gls)
2015–2019	Middlesbrough	0	(0)
2016	→ Barnsley (loan)	11	(1)
2016–2017	→ Sheffield United (loan)	12	(1)
2017–2018	→ Blackburn Rovers (loan)	12	(1)
2019–2022	Blackburn Rovers	15	(0)
2020–2021	→ Shrewsbury Town (loan)	23	(7)
2021–2022	→ Burton Albion (loan)	28	(1)
2022–2024	Bradford City	47	(2)
2024–2025	Barnet	22	(4)
2025–	Gateshead	0	(0)

International career
2015	England U18	2	(0)
2016–2017	England U20	8	(0)
- * Club domestic league appearances and goals as of 21:35, 9 May 2025 (UTC)

Harrison James Chapman (born 5 November 1997) is an English professional footballer who plays as a midfielder for Gateshead.

== Club career ==
=== Middlesbrough ===
Chapman signed his first professional contract with Championship club Middlesbrough in January 2015. Chapman played for Boro during the 2015–16 UEFA Youth League, contributing eight assists and three goals in six games – more assists than any other player in the competition.

==== Barnsley (loan) ====
On 26 February 2016, he joined League One side Barnsley until the end of the 2015–16 season; "Tykes" manager Paul Heckingbottom said that the club were lucky to sign Chapman. He made his debut in the Football League the following day, coming on for Lloyd Isgrove 73 minutes into a 2–1 win over Crewe Alexandra at Gresty Road. He scored his first senior goal on 5 March, in a 3–1 victory over Walsall at the Bescot Stadium. On 3 April, Chapman was a late substitute as Barnsley won the 2016 Football League Trophy Final. Chapman was in the squad that won the 2016 Football League play-offs at Wembley Stadium on 29 May.

==== Sheffield United (loan) ====
On 12 August 2016, Chapman joined Sheffield United on a season-long loan. He scored his first goal for the club in a 1–0 win over Bristol Rovers on 27 September 2016. Chapman then went on to score the first hat-trick of his professional career in a 6–0 FA Cup win against Leyton Orient. However, in November 2016 he picked up an injury that would lead to the end of his loan spell with the Blades in January 2017. It was agreed on 31 January 2017 that his loan spell would be renewed and he would rejoin the Blades upon his rehabilitation.

==== Blackburn Rovers (loan) ====
On 4 August 2017, Chapman completed a loan move to Blackburn Rovers for the 2017–18 season.

=== Blackburn Rovers ===
On 28 January 2019, Chapman signed a permanent contract with Blackburn Rovers on a 2½-year deal.

On 20 May 2022, Blackburn announced Chapman would be departing the club upon the expiry of his contract on 30 June.

==== Shrewsbury Town (loan) ====
On 31 December 2020, Chapman joined League One club Shrewsbury Town on a six-month loan until the end of the season. On 31 January, Chapman netted twice in a 2–0 win at home to Peterborough United. Three days later, in what Crewe Alexandra manager David Artell described as "a horrific tackle", Chapman broke the leg of Crewe forward Oliver Finney; he was yellow-carded for the foul, though Artell said the referee's assessor thought it "was probably a red card [offence]". He scored seven goals in 24 appearances for the Shropshire side.

==== Burton Albion (loan) ====
On 31 August 2021, Chapman joined League One club Burton Albion on a six-month loan until 2 January 2022. He made 15 appearances for Burton, scoring once – in his final appearance, a 4–1 win against Crewe Alexandra on 1 January 2022. At the end of the month, Chapman re-joined Burton on loan until the end of the season, making a further 15 appearances.

=== Bradford City ===
On 17 June 2022, Chapman signed a permanent contract with Bradford City on a 2-year deal.

Chapman featured frequently in his first season, but towards the end of the campaign he suffered a hamstring injury when he crashed into an advertising hoarding against Sutton United, which kept him out of action for many months. Bradford City released him at the end of the 2023–24 season.

=== Barnet ===
Chapman signed for Barnet ahead of the 2024–25 season. After seven goals in 23 appearances in all competitions, Chapman left the club at the end of the season after winning the National League title.

=== Gateshead ===
Chapman signed for Gateshead on a one-year deal on 25 July 2025.

== International career ==
Chapman has represented England at U18 level. He was selected for the England under-20 team in the 2017 FIFA U-20 World Cup, but was an unused substitute in the tournament that England won.

== Career statistics ==
As of end of 2024–2025 season

Appearances and goals by club, season and competition
Club	Season	League			FA Cup		EFL Cup		Other		Total	
Club	Season	Division	Apps	Goals	Apps	Goals	Apps	Goals	Apps	Goals	Apps	Goals
Middlesbrough	2015–16	Championship	0	0	0	0	0	0	0	0	0	0
Middlesbrough	2016–17	Premier League	0	0	0	0	0	0	—		0	0
Middlesbrough	2017–18	Championship	0	0	0	0	0	0	0	0	0	0
Middlesbrough	2018–19	Championship	0	0	1	0	3	0	0	0	4	0
Middlesbrough	Total		0	0	1	0	3	0	0	0	4	0
Barnsley (loan)	2015–16	League One	11	1	0	0	0	0	3 (Note: One appearance in the Football League Trophy; two appearances in the League One play-offs)	0	14	1
Sheffield United (loan)	2016–17	League One	12	1	1	3	0	0	1 (Note: Appearances in EFL Trophy)	0	14	4
Middlesbrough U23	2016–17 EFL Trophy		—		—		—		1	0	1	0
Blackburn Rovers (loan)	2017–18	League One	12	1	0	0	2	0	2	0	16	1
Blackburn Rovers	2018–19	Championship	2	0	0	0	0	0	—		2	0
Blackburn Rovers	2019–20	Championship	5	0	1	0	1	0	—		7	0
Blackburn Rovers	2020–21	Championship	5	0	0	0	2	0	—		7	0
Blackburn Rovers	2021–22	Championship	3	0	0	0	0	0	—		3	0
Blackburn Rovers	Total		15	0	1	0	3	0	0	0	19	0
Shrewsbury Town (loan)	2020–21	League One	23	7	1	0	0	0	0	0	24	7
Burton Albion (loan)	2021–22	League One	28	1	1	0	0	0	1	0	30	1
Bradford City	2022–23	League Two	32	2	1	0	2	0	2	0	37	2
Bradford City	2023–24	League Two	15	0	1	0	0	0	5	1	21	1
Bradford City	Total		47	2	2	0	2	0	7	1	58	3
Barnet	2024–25	National League	22	4	1	0	0	0	0	0	23	4
Career total			165	17	8	3	10	0	15	1	203	21

== Honours ==
Barnsley

- Football League One play-offs: 2016
- Football League Trophy: 2015–16

Sheffield United

- EFL League One: 2016–17

Blackburn Rovers

- EFL League One second-place promotion: 2017–18

Barnet

- National League: 2024–25

England U20

- FIFA U-20 World Cup: 2017
