= Dominic Samuel (English footballer) =

English footballer

Personal information
- Full name: Dominic James Samuel
- Date of birth: 1 April 1994 (age 32)
- Place of birth: Southwark, England
- Height: 6 ft 2 in (1.88 m)
- Position: Striker

Team information
- Current team: Ebbsfleet United
- Number: 12

Youth career
- –2012: Reading

Senior career*
Years	Team	Apps	(Gls)
2012–2017	Reading	11	(2)
2013	→ Colchester United (loan)	2	(0)
2014	→ Dagenham & Redbridge (loan)	1	(0)
2015	→ Coventry City (loan)	13	(6)
2015–2016	→ Gillingham (loan)	25	(7)
2017	→ Ipswich Town (loan)	6	(0)
2017–2020	Blackburn Rovers	53	(7)
2020–2021	Gillingham	22	(3)
2021–2023	Ross County	39	(1)
2023–	Ebbsfleet United	28	(7)

International career
2011–2013	England U19	3	(2)
- * Club domestic league appearances and goals as of 18:34, 26 August 2024 (UTC)

Dominic James Samuel (born 1 April 1994) is an English professional footballer who plays as a striker for National League South club Ebbsfleet United.

== Club career ==
As part of the Reading Academy, Samuel enjoyed a prolific start to the 2011–12 season, scoring 13 goals in 14 games for the under-18 side. As a result, he was rewarded with his first professional contract on 17 December 2011. He made his debut for Reading coming on as a 72nd-minute substitute, for Garath McCleary, in Reading's 3–0 defeat away to Sunderland on 11 December 2012.

On 3 January 2013 Samuel joined League One side Colchester United on a one-month youth loan deal. After making two appearances, he returned to Reading on 31 January. On 9 January 2014, Samuel joined teammate Lawson D'Ath at Dagenham & Redbridge on a one-month youth loan. He made his debut three days later against Fleetwood Town though he was forced off during the first half with a knee injury. Reading later confirmed that his loan had been cut short as the damage needed to be repaired surgically.

On 29 January 2015, Samuel joined Coventry City on loan till 28 April 2015, scoring on his debut against Rochdale.

On 13 November 2015, Samuel joined League One side Gillingham on an emergency loan deal until 10 December. On 9 December, Samuel had his loan spell with Gillingham extended until 2 January 2016.

On 5 January 2016, Gillingham announced that Samuel had extended his stay at Priestfield for another three weeks.

Samuel scored his first goal for Reading against Burton Albion on 19 November 2016.

On 31 January 2017, Samuel joined Ipswich Town on loan for the remainder of the 2016–17 season.

=== Blackburn Rovers ===
On 18 July 2017, Samuel signed a three-year deal with Blackburn Rovers for an undisclosed fee. He started his Rovers career brightly with four goals in his first six appearances, but a major anterior cruciate ligament injury later stifled his development.

On 24 June 2020 it was announced that he had signed a short contract extension to allow him to remain with the club until the end of the 2019–20 season after its resumption following the Coronavirus outbreak, but he was then released at the end of the season.

=== Gillingham ===
On 21 September 2020 Samuel re-joined Gillingham on a permanent basis. He scored two goals on his second debut for the Kent side on 26 September 2020, leading the Gills to a 2-0 league victory over Blackpool.

=== Ross County ===
On 29 June 2021 Samuel joined Scottish Premiership side Ross County on a two-year deal. The prolific striker started in fine form scoring a deflection against East Fife in one of his 39 games with the club. Samuel was released by the club on 15 June 2023 upon the expiry of his contract after two years at the club.

=== Ebbsfleet United ===
On 27 October 2023, Samuel joined National League side Ebbsfleet United.

== International career ==
Samuel made his debut England under-19 against Portugal on 7 October 2011. Samuel scored his first goal for the under-19s in his next match for them, against Ukraine, in a 3–1 victory on 9 October 2011.

== Career statistics ==
As of match played 2 January 2023

Appearances and goals by club, season and competition
Club	Season	League			Cup		League Cup		Other		Total	
Club	Season	Division	Apps	Goals	Apps	Goals	Apps	Goals	Apps	Goals	Apps	Goals
Reading	2012–13	Premier League	1	0	0	0	0	0	—		1	0
Reading	2014–15	Championship	0	0	1	0	0	0	—		1	0
Reading	2015–16	Championship	1	0	0	0	1	0	—		2	0
Reading	2016–17	Championship	9	2	1	0	2	0	—		12	2
Reading	Total		11	2	2	0	3	0	—		16	2
Colchester United (loan)	2012–13	League One	2	0	—		—		—		2	0
Dagenham & Redbridge (loan)	2013–14	League Two	1	0	—		—		—		1	0
Coventry City (loan)	2014–15	League One	13	6	—		—		—		13	6
Gillingham (loan)	2015–16	League One	25	7	—		—		—		25	7
Reading U23	2016–17	—	—		—		—		3 (Note: Appearances in EFL Trophy)	0	3	0
Ipswich Town (loan)	2016–17	Championship	6	0	0	0	0	0	—		6	0
Blackburn Rovers	2017–18	League One	36	5	2	2	2	1	1	0	41	8
Blackburn Rovers	2018–19	Championship	2	0	0	0	1	0	—		3	0
Blackburn Rovers	2019–20	Championship	15	2	0	0	0	0	—		15	2
Blackburn Rovers	Total		53	7	2	2	3	1	1	0	59	10
Gillingham	2020–21	League One	22	3	2	3	0	0	2	0	26	6
Ross County	2021–22	Scottish Premiership	28	1	1	0	2	0	—		31	1
Ross County	2022–23	Scottish Premiership	11	0	0	0	4	1	—		15	1
Ross County	Total		39	1	1	0	6	1	0	0	46	2
Career total			172	26	7	5	12	2	6	0	198	33

== Honours ==
Blackburn Rovers

- EFL League One runner-up: 2017–18
