= 2017–18 Blackburn Rovers F.C. season =

Blackburn Rovers F.C.
2017–18 season
- Director: Mike Cheston
- Manager: Tony Mowbray
- Stadium: Ewood Park
- League One: 2nd
- FA Cup: Third round (vs. Hull City)
- EFL Cup: Second round (vs. Burnley)
- EFL Trophy: Group Stage
- Top goalscorer: League: Bradley Dack (18); All: Bradley Dack (18)
- Average home league attendance: 12,173
Home colours	Away colours

The 2017–18 season was Blackburn Rovers' 130th season as a professional football club and its first playing in League One following its relegation from the Championship the previous season. Along with competing in the League One, the club also participated in the FA Cup, EFL Cup and EFL Trophy. Thanks to a 0–1 win against Doncaster Rovers on 24 April, Blackburn were promoted back to the Championship. This was the only season that any former Premier League champion competed below the second tier of English football, until the 2026-27 season when 2015-16 champions Leicester City will compete in League One. The season covers the period from 1 July 2017 to 30 June 2018.

== Summer activity ==
=== May ===
On 8 May Rovers announced Paul Senior has resigned from his role as Director of Football and Operations.

On 16 May Rovers owners Venky's have brought in accountancy firms Deloitte and KPMG to carry out an overview of the club.

On 18 May Rovers announced their retained list: Adam Henley, Gordon Greer, Jason Lowe, Hope Akpan, Danny Guthrie, Wes Brown, Ramirez Howarth and Joshua Askew have not been offered further terms. The following academy scholars will not be retained: Ben Ascroft, Alex Curran, Mason Fawns, Callum Hendry, Matthew Makinson, Tre Pemberton, Joel Steer and Ben Williams with non-contracted player Joshua Powell also released.

The club also announced that new contract offers had been made to Connor Mahoney and Lewis Travis. Whilst professional contract offers have been made to youngsters Charley Doyle, Joe Grayson, Tyler Magloire and Stefan Mols.

=== June ===
On 2 June Rovers announced Mark Venus had joined as the club's Assistant Manager.

On 8 June Rovers confirmed Tony Mowbray's backroom staff after the appointment of Mark Venus, David Lowe will take up the role as first team coach, David Dunn will revert to his role as assistant coach of the under 23s and Ben Benson will remain as goalkeeping coach.

On 9 June Rovers announced Tony Mowbray has committed his long-term future to the club signing a new 2-year contract with the option of a further 12 months.

On 13 June Rovers announced the signing of midfielder Peter Whittingham on a free from Cardiff City. The 32-year-old, became manager Tony Mowbray's first signing, putting pen-to-paper on a two-year deal at Ewood Park, which runs through to the summer of 2019.

On 14 June Rovers announced promising young defender Lewis Travis has signed a new 1-year deal.

On 16 June Rovers were drawn against Coventry City at the Ricoh Arena in first round of the EFL Cup, Tony Mowbray old club.

On 17 June Rovers announced three of Rovers rising stars midfielders Joe Grayson and Stefan Mols and defender Charley Doyle had all signed their first professional contracts, signing two-year deals.

On 20 June Rovers announced the signing of midfielder Richie Smallwood on a free from Rotherham United, putting pen-to-paper on a two-year deal with the option of a further year.

On 26 June Rovers announced that another rising star, defender Tyler Magloire, has signed his first professional contract, signing a two-year deal.

On 26 June Rovers announced that first team coach David Lowe has pledged his commitment to the club by putting pen-to-paper on a new long-term contract.

On 27 June Rovers announced the signing of attacking midfielder Bradley Dack from Gillingham for a reported £750,000 plus add-ons, on a 3-year deal.

On 28 June Rovers announced the signing of midfielder Ben Gladwin from Queens Park Rangers for an undisclosed fee, on a 2-year deal.

On 29 June Rovers commenced pre-season training.

=== July ===
On 4 July Bournemouth announced the signing of midfielder Connor Mahoney on a 4-year deal after rejecting a new contract at Rovers, compensation to be agreed.

On 11 July Rovers announced that Eric Kinder has left his position as the club's Head of Academy.

On 18 July Rovers announced rising stars will continue to compete at the highest level of youth football after the club confirmed it will remain a Category One Academy.

On 18 July Burton Albion announced the signing of midfielder Hope Akpan on a 1-year deal following his release from Rovers.

On 19 July Rovers announced the signing of striker Dominic Samuel from Reading for an undisclosed fee, on a 3-year deal.

On 20 July Rovers announced the signing of defender Paul Caddis following a successful trial at the club on a 2-year deal, he was a free agent following his release from Bury.

On 21 July Rovers announced the departure of striker Anthony Stokes by mutual consent.

On 21 July Rovers announced that defender Ryan Nyambe had signed a new long term contract, signing a 3-year deal, with the option of a further 12 months.

On 22 July Rovers announced the signing of striker Joe Nuttall following a successful trial scoring 5 goals in 2 games for the u23s, on a 12-month deal with option of a further 12 months, he was a free agent following his release from Aberdeen.

On 24 July Rovers announced the appointment of Stuart Jones as Head of Academy, he joined as the Academy as Head of Education in 2011, before moving up to the role of Head of Academy Operations four years later.

On 26 July Rovers announced Jason Steele has joined Sunderland for an undisclosed fee.

On 31 July Kilmarnock announced the signing of defender Gordon Greer following his release from Rovers.

On 31 July Rovers announced Goalkeeping Coach Ben Benson has signed a new long term deal at the club.

=== August ===
On 2 August Rovers announced the signing of Canadian International Goalkeeper Jayson Leutwiler from Shrewsbury Town on a 2-year deal for an undisclosed fee.

On 2 August Hibernian announced the signing of striker Anthony Stokes on a 2-year deal following his release from Rovers.

On 4 August Rovers announced the signing of midfielder Harry Chapman on loan for the season from Middlesbrough.

On 11 August Rovers announced the signing of forward Marcus Antonsson on loan for the season from Leeds United.

On 14 August Rovers announced the appointment of Tony Carss as the academy's Head of Coaching.

On 15 August Kerala Blasters announced the signing of Wes Brown for the upcoming Indian Super League season, following his release from Rovers.

On 31 August Birmingham City announced the signing of Jason Lowe on a 12-month contract following his release from Rovers.

On 31 August Rovers announced the signings of midfielder Rekeem Harper on loan for the season from West Brom, defender Sam Hart from Liverpool on a 2-year deal for an Undisclosed fee and defender Paul Downing on loan for a season from Milton Keynes Dons. It was also announced that midfielder Liam Feeney has gone out on loan to Cardiff City until 1 January 2018.

=== September ===
On 11 September Rovers announced that defender Scott Wharton had signed a new 3-year contract.

=== October ===
On 5 October Rovers announced that striker Daniel Butterworth had signed his first professional contract, a 2-year deal.

On 5 October Rovers announced that midfielder Elliott Bennett had signed a new 2-year contract.

=== November ===
On 3 November Rovers announced that midfielder Willem Tomlinson had signed a new and extended contract until 2019.

On 13 November Rovers announced that goalkeeper Andy Fisher had signed a new and extended contract until 2019.

On 28 November Rovers announced that midfielder Lewis Hardcastle had signed a new and extended contract until 2019.

=== December ===
On 18 December Rovers announced that defender Matthew Platt had signed a new and extended contract until 2019.

On 18 December Rovers announced the appointment of Steve Waggott as the club's new chief executive.

== Winter activity ==
=== January ===
On 2 January Rovers announced West Brom have recalled Rekeem Harper from his loan spell.

On 5 January Rovers announced that midfielder Liam Feeney will remain on loan at Cardiff City until the end of the season.

On 8 January Rovers announced that defender Paul Downing has signed permanently from Milton Keynes Dons following his loan spell for an undisclosed fee.

On 9 January Rovers announced that striker Adam Armstrong has joined on loan for the remainder of the season from Newcastle United.

On 16 January Rovers announced that attacking midfielder Jack Payne has joined on loan for the remainder of the season from Huddersfield Town.

On 17 January Rovers announced that defender Sam Hart has joined Rochdale on loan for the remainder of the season.

On 18 January Rovers announced that striker Joe Nuttall has signed a new 3 1/2-year deal, until 2021.

On 19 January Rovers announced the signing of defender Amari'i Bell from Fleetwood Town for an undisclosed fee on a 2 1/2-year contract.

On 26 January Rovers announced that midfielder John Buckley had signed his first professional contract, until 2020.

On 30 January Rovers announced that defender Elliott Ward has joined Milton Keynes Dons on loan for the remainder of the season.

On 31 January Rovers announced that the club has agreed to terminate the contract of young midfielder Connor Thomson by mutual consent, young center-back Scott Wharton has joined Lincoln City on loan until the end of the season, academy midfielder Callum Wright has joined Leicester City for an undisclosed fee.

=== February ===
On 1 February Rovers announced that goalkeeper David Raya has signed a new 3 1/2-year deal, until 2021.

On 2 February Rovers announced that young versatile midfielder Lewis Travis has signed a new 3 1/2-year deal, until 2021.

On 7 February Rovers announced that midfielder Jack Evans had signed his first professional contract, until 2020.

On 14 February Rovers announced the signing of highly rated young forward Okera Simmonds from Liverpool on a 1 1/2-year contract and will link up with the u23s squad.

On 16 February Rovers announced that defender Hayden Carter had signed his first professional contract, until 2020.

On 14 February Rovers announced the signing of goalkeeper Oliver Byrne, who was recently with Cardiff City on a 1 1/2-year contract and will link up with the u23s squad.

On 22 February Rovers announced that defender Jack Doyle has joined Derry City on loan for the remainder of the season.

=== March ===
On 3 March Rovers announced that young Canadian midfielder Ben Paton had signed his first professional contract, until 2019.

On 16 March Rovers announced that young attacking midfielder Jack Vale had signed his first professional contract, until 2020.

On 20 March Rovers announced that young defender Lewis Thompson had signed his first professional contract, until 2019.

=== April ===
On 3 April Rovers trio David Raya, Charlie Mulgrew and Bradley Dack have all been included in the EFL League One Team of the Year.

On 15 April Rovers star Bradley Dack has been named as the League One Player of the Year.

On 18 April Rovers players Bradley Dack, Charlie Mulgrew, Danny Graham and Amari'i Bell were announced in the PFA League One Team of the Year.

On 20 April Rovers U23 were crowned champions of the Premier League 2 Division 2.

On 24 April Rovers won promotion back to the Championship, following a 1–0 at Doncaster Rovers.

=== May ===
On 5 May Rovers announced Bradley Dack as the Player of the Season, he also won Goal of the Season with his goal against Peterborough.

On 7 May Rovers held their end of season awards the winners follow:

Young Player – David Raya, Players’ Player – Charlie Mulgrew, Best Newcomer – Richie Smallwood, Unsung Hero – Elliott Bennett, Man of the Match (Seasonal) – Bradley Dack, Goal of the Season – Bradley Dack, Player of the Year – Bradley Dack, Special Achievement – Tony Mowbray.

== Squad information ==
Squad No.	Name	Nationality	Position(s)	Date of birth (age)	Contract Expires	Other
Goalkeepers
1	David Raya	(Spain)	GK	15 September 1995 (age 31)	2021	
13	Jayson Leutwiler	(Canada)	GK	25 April 1989 (age 37)	2019	Option for 1-year extension
37	Andy Fisher	(England)	GK	12 February 1998 (age 28)	2019	
Defenders
2	Ryan Nyambe	(Namibia)	DF	4 December 1997 (age 28)	2020	Option for 1-year extension
3	Derrick Williams	(Republic of Ireland)	DF	17 January 1993 (age 33)	2019	
5	Sam Hart	(England)	DF	10 September 1996 (age 30)	2019	On loan at Rochdale
14	Charlie Mulgrew	(Scotland)	DF/MF	6 March 1986 (age 40)	2019	Club Captain
15	Elliott Ward	(England)	DF	19 January 1985 (age 41)	2018	On loan at Milton Keynes Dons
16	Paul Caddis	(Scotland)	DF	19 April 1988 (age 38)	2019	
17	Amari'i Bell	(England)	DF	5 May 1994 (age 32)	2020	
25	Paul Downing	(England)	DF	26 October 1991 (age 35)	2019	Option for 1-year extension
26	Darragh Lenihan	(Republic of Ireland)	DF/MF	16 March 1994 (age 32)	2019	
34	Scott Wharton	(England)	DF	3 October 1997 (age 29)	2020	On loan at Lincoln City
35	Lewis Travis	(England)	DF/MF	16 October 1997 (age 29)	2021	
36	Jack Doyle	(England)	DF	2 February 1997 (age 29)	2019	On loan at Derry City
39	Matthew Platt	(England)	DF	3 October 1997 (age 29)	2019	
Midfielders
6	Richie Smallwood	(England)	MF	29 December 1990 (age 35)	2019	Option for 1-year extension
7	Liam Feeney	(England)	MF	21 January 1987 (age 39)	2018	Option for 1-year extension On loan at Cardiff City
8	Harry Chapman	(England)	MF	5 November 1997 (age 29)	2018 (loan)	On loan from Middlesbrough
11	Peter Whittingham	(England)	MF	8 September 1984 (age 42)	2019	
19	Jack Payne	(England)	MF	25 October 1994 (age 32)	2018 (loan)	On loan from Huddersfield Town
22	Ben Gladwin	(England)	MF	8 June 1992 (age 34)	2019	
23	Bradley Dack	(England)	MF	31 December 1993 (age 32)	2020	Option for 1-year extension
28	Willem Tomlinson	(England)	MF	27 January 1998 (age 28)	2019	
29	Corry Evans	(Northern Ireland)	MF	30 July 1990 (age 36)	2019	
31	Elliott Bennett	(Jamaica)	MF	18 December 1988 (age 37)	2020	
32	Craig Conway	(Scotland)	MF	2 May 1985 (age 41)	2018	
42	Joe Rankin-Costello	(England)	MF	26 July 1999 (age 27)	2019	
43	Stefan Mols	(Spain)	MF	31 January 1999 (age 27)	2019	
44	Lewis Hardcastle	(England)	MF	4 July 1998 (age 28)	2019	
Forwards
9	Dominic Samuel	(England)	FW	1 April 1994 (age 32)	2020	
10	Danny Graham	(England)	FW	12 August 1985 (age 41)	2018	Option for 1-year extension
18	Adam Armstrong	(England)	FW	10 February 1997 (age 29)	2018 (loan)	On loan from Newcastle United
20	Marcus Antonsson	(Sweden)	FW	8 May 1991 (age 35)	2018 (loan)	On loan from Leeds United
38	Joe Nuttall	(England)	FW	27 January 1997 (age 29)	2021	
41	Lewis Mansell	(Wales)	FW	20 September 1997 (age 29)	2018	
45	Daniel Butterworth	(England)	FW	14 September 1999 (age 27)	2020	

== Pre-season friendlies ==
As of 17 June 2017, Blackburn Rovers have announced six pre-season friendlies against Barrow, Morecambe, Grimsby Town, York City, Carlisle United and Sparta Prague.

8 July 2017 Friendly	Barrow	1–2	Blackburn Rovers	Barrow-in-Furness
15:00 BST	Richie Bennett 68'	Report	Conway 41'; Graham 91'	Stadium: Furness Building Society Stadium; Attendance: 891 (418 Rovers fans)

14 July 2017 Friendly	Sparta Prague	1–0	Blackburn Rovers	Salzburg, Austria
16:00 CEST	Janko 50'	Report		Stadium: The SAK Stadium Nonntal

18 July 2017 Friendly	York City	0–8	Blackburn Rovers	York
19:30 BST		Report	Dack 12'; Evans 17'; Gladwin 27' 44'; Caddis 53' 59'; Graham 74'; Bennett 84'	Stadium: Bootham Crescent; Attendance: 1,037 (276 Rovers fans)

21 July 2017 Friendly	Morecambe	1–2	Blackburn Rovers	Morecambe
19:30 BST	Turner 40'	Report	Graham 10'; Bennett 31'	Stadium: Globe Arena; Attendance: 1,714 (1,122 Rovers fans)

25 July 2017 Friendly	Grimsby Town	0–1	Blackburn Rovers	Grimsby
19:30 BST		Report	Graham 64'	Stadium: Blundell Park; Attendance: 1,692 (157 Rovers fans)

28 July 2017 Friendly	Carlisle United	3-1	Blackburn Rovers	Carlisle
19:45 BST	Nyambe (o.g.); Lambe 41'; S. Miller 90+1'	Report	Graham 17'	Stadium: Brunton Park; Attendance: 1816 (312 Rovers Fans)

== League One ==
=== League table ===
Pos	Team	Pld	W	D	L	GF	GA	GD	Pts	Promotion, qualification or relegation
1	Wigan Athletic (C, P)	46	29	11	6	89	29	+60	98	Promotion to the EFL Championship
2	Blackburn Rovers (P)	46	28	12	6	82	40	+42	96	Promotion to the EFL Championship
3	Shrewsbury Town	46	25	12	9	60	39	+21	87	Qualification for League One play-offs (Note: Four teams play for one spot and promotion to the EFL Championship.)
4	Rotherham United (O, P)	46	24	7	15	73	53	+20	79	Qualification for League One play-offs
5	Scunthorpe United	46	19	17	10	65	50	+15	74	Qualification for League One play-offs

Source: BBC Sport
Rules for classification: 1) Points; 2) Goal difference; 3) Number of goals scored
(C) Champions; (O) Play-off winners; (P) Promoted

=== Result by round ===
Round	1	2	3	4	5	6	7	8	9	10	11	12	13	14	15	16	17	18	19	20	21	22	23	24	25	26	27	28	29	30	31	32	33	34	35	36	37	38	39	40	41	42	43	44	45	46
Ground	A	H	A	H	A	A	H	A	H	H	A	H	H	A	H	A	A	H	A	A	H	A	H	H	A	H	A	H	H	A	H	A	H	A	A	H	H	H	A	H	A	A	H	A	A	H
Result	L	L	W	W	W	W	L	D	W	W	L	D	W	D	D	W	W	W	W	W	W	D	W	D	D	W	W	D	W	L	D	W	W	W	W	D	W	W	W	W	D	D	W	W	L	W
Position	15	22	17	10	10	10	11	9	8	6	10	10	6	7	6	6	6	5	4	3	3	3	3	3	3	3	2	3	2	3	3	2	1	1	1	1	1	2	1	1	2	2	2	2	2	2

Updated to match(es) played on 31 January 2018. Source: http://www.statto.com/football/teams/blackburn-rovers/2017-2018/results
A = Away; H = Home; W = Win; D = Draw; L = Loss

=== Matchday ===
5 August 2017 1	Southend United	2–1	Blackburn Rovers	Southend-on-Sea
15:00 BST	Leonard 27'; Kightly 38'	Report	Mulgrew 53'; Lenihan (yellow card) 55'; Nyambe (yellow card) 70'; Williams (yellow card) 72'	Stadium: Roots Hall; Attendance: 9,257; Referee: Lee Swabey

12 August 2017 2	Blackburn Rovers	1–3	Doncaster Rovers	Blackburn
15:00 BST	Mulgrew (yellow card) 66'; Evans (yellow card) 74'; Samuel 87'	Report	Marquis 46'; Coppinger 67' (pen.); May 82'	Stadium: Ewood Park; Attendance: 12,223; Referee: David Webb

19 August 2017 3	Bradford City	0–1	Blackburn Rovers	Bradford
15:00 BST	Dieng (yellow card) 23'; McCartan (yellow card) 37'; McMahon (yellow card) 67'; Kilgallon (yellow card) 90+3'	Report	Samuel (yellow card) 45+1' (goal) 47'; Smallwood (yellow card) 59'	Stadium: Valley Parade; Attendance: 21,403; Referee: Peter Bankes

26 August 2017 4	Blackburn Rovers	4–1	Milton Keynes Dons	Blackburn
15:00 BST	Williams 2' (yellow card) 35'; Mulgrew 29' 77'; Samuel 83'	Report	Upson 25'; Lewington (yellow card) 75'	Stadium: Ewood Park; Attendance: 10,111; Referee: Scott Duncan

9 September 2017 5	Rochdale	0–3	Blackburn Rovers	Rochdale
15:00 BST		Report	Smallwood 10'; Antonsson 57'; Dack (yellow card) 70'; Graham 79'	Stadium: Spotland; Attendance: 6,524; Referee: Steve Martin

12 September 2017 6	Scunthorpe United	0–1	Blackburn Rovers	Scunthorpe
19:45 BST		Report	Antonsson 58'; Graham (yellow card) 90+3'	Stadium: Glanford Park; Attendance: 4,330; Referee: Seb Stockbridge

16 September 2017 7	Blackburn Rovers	0–1	AFC Wimbledon	Blackburn
15:00 BST	Bennett (yellow card) 69'; Evans (yellow card) 89'	Report	Appiah 16'; Nightingale (yellow card) 60'; Fuller (yellow card) 86'	Stadium: Ewood Park; Attendance: 10,833; Referee: Trevor Kettle

23 September 2017 8	Shrewsbury Town	1–1	Blackburn Rovers	Shrewsbury
15:00 BST	Nsiala 57'	Report	Dack (yellow card) 56' (goal) 85'	Stadium: New Meadow; Attendance: 8,202; Referee: David Webb

26 September 2017 9	Blackburn Rovers	2–0	Rotherham United	Blackburn
19:45 BST	Downing (yellow card) 23'; Antonsson 27'; Samuel (yellow card) 45+3'; Evans (yellow card) 71'; Chapman 85'	Report	Rodák (yellow card) 45+3'; Wood (yellow card) 80'; Vaulks (yellow card) 90'; Moore (yellow card) 90+4'	Stadium: Ewood Park; Attendance: 10,228; Referee: Mark Heywood

30 September 2017 10	Blackburn Rovers	1–0	Gillingham	Blackburn
15:00	Samuel 31'; Chapman (yellow card) 85'	Report	Byrne (yellow card) 11'; Clare (yellow card) 23'	Stadium: Ewood Park; Attendance: 10,844; Referee: Robert Jones

14 October 2017 11	Oldham Athletic	1–0	Blackburn Rovers	Oldham
15:00 BST	Dummigan (yellow card) 16'; Menig 90'	Report	Smallwood (yellow card) 61'; Bennett (yellow card) 73'; Chapman (yellow card) 75'; Dack (yellow card) 79'	Stadium: Boundary Park; Attendance: 7,784; Referee: Darren Handley

17 October 2017 12	Blackburn Rovers	1–1	Plymouth Argyle	Blackburn
19:45 BST	Smallwood (yellow card) 13'; Dack 45+2'	Report	Carey 31'	Stadium: Ewood Park; Attendance: 10,011; Referee: Eddie Ilderton

21 October 2017 13	Blackburn Rovers	3–0	Portsmouth	Blackburn
15:00 BST	Dack 38'; Graham 58'; Nyambe (yellow card) 60'; Samuel (red card) 87'; Conway 90'	Report	Donohue (yellow card) 54'	Stadium: Ewood Park; Attendance: Chris Kavanagh; Referee: 11,673

28 October 2017 14	Wigan Athletic	0–0	Blackburn Rovers	Wigan
15:00 BST		Report	Bennett (yellow card) 43' (yellow-red card) 58'; Smallwood (yellow card) 56'; Whittingham (yellow card) 82'; Chapman (yellow card) 85'	Stadium: DW Stadium; Attendance: 11,211; Referee: Darren England

31 October 2017 15	Blackburn Rovers	2–2	Fleetwood Town	Blackburn
19:45 GMT	Smallwood (yellow card) 44'; Dack 53'; Nuttall 77'; Williams (yellow card) 88'	Report	O'Neill 64' (yellow card) 68'; Burns 82'	Stadium: Ewood Park; Attendance: 10,399; Referee: Darren Drysdale

11 November 2017 P	Blackburn Rovers	v	Walsall	Blackburn
15:00 GMT				Stadium: Ewood Park
Note: On 31 October, the scheduled home fixture against Walsall was postponed due to international call-ups.

18 November 2017 16	Bury	0–3	Blackburn Rovers	Bury
15:00 GMT		Report	Antonsson 12', 37'; Dack 63'	Stadium: Gigg Lane; Attendance: 7,159; Referee: Dean Whitestone

21 November 2017 17	Oxford United	2–4	Blackburn Rovers	Oxford
19:45 GMT	Payne 45+2'; Obika 85'	Report	Mulgrew 6', 22' (pen.) (yellow card) 74'; Antonsson 17'; Nuttall 71'; Downing (yellow card) 82'	Stadium: Kassam Stadium; Attendance: 6,965; Referee: John Brooks

25 November 2017 18	Blackburn Rovers	2–1	Bristol Rovers	Blackburn
15:00 GMT	Mulgrew 61' (pen.); Samuel 67'; Nyambe (yellow card) 78'	Report	Harrison (yellow card) 58' (goal) 58'; Leadbitter (yellow card) 86'	Stadium: Ewood Park; Attendance: 11,660; Referee: Ross Joyce

28 November 2017 19	Blackpool	2–4	Blackburn Rovers	Blackpool
19:45 GMT	Mellor 29'; Ryan (yellow card) 42'; Philliskirk 75'	Report	Antonsson 25'; Smallwood (yellow card) 42'; Dack 45'; Mulgrew 63'; Downing 67'; Williams (yellow card) 78'	Stadium: Bloomfield Road; Attendance: 5,302; Referee: Andy Madley

9 December 2017 20	Peterborough United	2–3	Blackburn Rovers	Peterborough
15:00 GMT	Baldwin (yellow card) 3' (yellow-red card) 90+5'; Taylor 11'; Marriott 90+3'; Tafazolli (yellow card) 90+5'	Report	Antonsson (yellow card) 30'; Mulgrew 48'; Dack 51', 58'; Smallwood (yellow card) 61'	Stadium: London Road Stadium; Attendance: 6,164; Referee: Nick Kinseley

16 December 2017 21	Blackburn Rovers	2–0	Charlton Athletic	Blackburn
15:00 GMT	Best 30' (o.g.); Nuttall (yellow card) 90'; Graham 90+4'	Report	Forster-Caskey (yellow card) 32'; Pearce (yellow card) 35'	Stadium: Ewood Park; Attendance: 10,907; Referee: Geoff Eltringham

23 December 2017 22	Northampton Town	1–1	Blackburn Rovers	Northampton
14:00 GMT	Pierre 21'; O'Toole (yellow card) 90+3'	Report	Ward (yellow card) 36'; Downing (yellow card) 43'; Dack 48'	Stadium: Sixfields Stadium; Attendance: 6,541; Referee: Gavin Ward

26 December 2017 23	Blackburn Rovers	2–0	Rochdale	Blackburn
15:00 GMT	Smallwood (yellow card) 24'; Ntlhe 35' (o.g.); Mulgrew 42' (pen.); Williams (yellow card) 84'; Nuttall (yellow card) 85'	Report		Stadium: Ewood Park; Attendance: 15,115; Referee: Michael Salisbury

30 December 2017 24	Blackburn Rovers	2–2	Scunthorpe United	Blackburn
15:00 GMT	Graham 6', 47'; Smallwood (yellow card) 75'; Dack (yellow card) 84'; Bennett (yellow card) 88'	Report	van Veen 12'; Hopper (yellow card) 38'; Townsend (yellow card) 56'	Stadium: Ewood Park; Attendance: 12,784; Referee: Andy Haines

1 January 2018 25	Rotherham United	1–1	Blackburn Rovers	Rotherham
15:00 GMT	Dack 66'; Mulgrew (yellow card) 77'	Report	Ball 89'; Ajayi (yellow card) 90+4'	Stadium: New York Stadium; Attendance: 9,347; Referee: Martin Coy

6 January 2018 P	AFC Wimbledon	v	Blackburn Rovers	Norbiton
15:00 GMT				Stadium: Kingsmeadow
Note: On 3 December, it was announced that the away trip to face AFC Wimbledon was to be rearranged due to FA Cup third round involvement.

13 January 2018 26	Blackburn Rovers	3–1	Shrewsbury Town	Blackburn
15:00 GMT	Mulgrew 6', 70' (pen.); Raya (yellow card) 35'; Graham 60'	Report	Beckles (yellow card) 13'; Nolan 35' (pen.)	Stadium: Ewood Park; Attendance: 13,579; Referee: John Brooks

20 January 2018 27	Fleetwood Town	1–2	Blackburn Rovers	Fleetwood Town
15:00 GMT	McAleny 55'	Report	Dack 28'; Smallwood 83'	Stadium: Highbury Stadium; Attendance: 4,391; Referee: Andy Woolmer

27 January 2018 28	Blackburn Rovers	1–1	Northampton Town	Blackburn
15:00 GMT	Graham 74'	Report	O'Toole 12'	Stadium: Ewood Park; Attendance: 12,555; Referee: Anthony Backhouse

30 January 2018 29	Blackburn Rovers	3–1	Walsall	Blackburn
19:45 GMT	Graham 5', 32'; Dack 47'	Report	Edwards 37'	Stadium: Ewood Park; Attendance: 11,241; Referee: Steve Martin

4 February 2018 30	Plymouth Argyle	2–0	Blackburn Rovers	Plymouth
15:00 GMT	Lameiras 25'; Taylor 37'	Report	Samuel (yellow card) 46'; Dack (yellow card) 47'; Bennett (yellow card) 75'	Stadium: Home Park; Attendance: 11,801 (1,226 away); Referee: Charles Breakspear

10 February 2018 31	Blackburn Rovers	2–2	Oldham Athletic	Blackburn
15:00 GMT	Mulgrew 63'; Armstrong 71'	Report	Nazon 26', 38'; Pringle (yellow card) 32'; Fané (yellow card) 45+4'; Davies (yellow card) 62'; Moimbé (red card) 82'	Stadium: Ewood Park; Attendance: 13,665; Referee: Darren Drysdale

13 February 2018 32	Portsmouth	1–2	Blackburn Rovers	Portsmouth
19:45 GMT	Thompson (yellow card) 30'; Chaplin 50'	Report	Dack (yellow card) 3'; Armstrong 21', 87'; Travis (red card) 90+2'	Stadium: Fratton Park; Attendance: 18,152; Referee: Oliver Langford

19 February 2018 33	Blackburn Rovers	2–0	Bury	Blackburn
19:45 GMT	Graham 51'; Armstrong 67'	Report	Cameron (yellow card) 86'	Stadium: Ewood Park; Attendance: 12,038; Referee: John Busby

24 February 2018 34	Walsall	1–2	Blackburn Rovers	Walsall
15:00 GMT	Fitzwater 45'; Dobson (yellow card) 85'; Ngoy (yellow card) 88'	Report	Graham 17', 26'	Stadium: Bescot Stadium; Attendance: 6,893; Referee: Ross Joyce

27 February 2018 35	AFC Wimbledon	0–3	Blackburn Rovers	Kingston upon Thames
19:45 GMT		Report	Nyambe (yellow card) 7'; Dack 30', 69'; Bennett 64'	Stadium: Kingsmeadow; Attendance: 4,401; Referee: Graham Scott

4 March 2018 36	Blackburn Rovers	2–2	Wigan Athletic	Blackburn
15:00 GMT	Armstrong 6'; Bennett 17', (yellow card) 60'; Evans (yellow card) 25'; Nyambe (yellow card) 86'	Report	Morsy (yellow card) 35'; Elder (yellow card) 54'; Jacobs 63'; Powell (yellow card) 68'; Power 73'	Stadium: Ewood Park; Attendance: 16,142; Referee: Geoff Eltringham

10 March 2018 37	Blackburn Rovers	3–0	Blackpool	Blackburn
15:00 GMT	Dack 45'; Evans (yellow card) 48'; Armstrong 69', 90'; Mulgrew (yellow card) 85'	Report	Vassell (yellow card) 51'; Delfouneso (yellow card) 59'	Stadium: Ewood Park; Attendance: 13,230; Referee: Lee Probert

29 March 2018 38	Blackburn Rovers	2–0	Bradford City	Blackburn
19:45 BST	Dack 68'; Bell (yellow card) 70'; Conway 80'	Report	Knight-Percival (yellow card) 5'	Stadium: Ewood Park; Attendance: 13,443; Referee: Chris Sarginson

2 April 2018 39	Milton Keynes Dons	1–2	Blackburn Rovers	Milton Keynes
15:00 BST	Pawlett 72', (yellow card) 76'	Report	Armstrong 12', 45+1'; Williams (yellow card) 75'	Stadium: Stadium MK; Attendance: 11,215; Referee: Kevin Friend

7 April 2018 40	Blackburn Rovers	1–0	Southend United	Blackburn
15:00 BST	Graham 59'; Smallwood (yellow card) 84'; Downing (yellow card) 90'	Report	Cox (yellow card) 90'	Stadium: Ewood Park; Attendance: 13,186; Referee: Andy Woolmer

10 April 2018 41	Gillingham	0–0	Blackburn Rovers	Gillingham
19:45 BST		Report	Lenihan (yellow card) 90+3'	Stadium: Priestfield Stadium; Attendance: 6,361; Referee: Andy Woolmer

14 April 2018 42	Bristol Rovers	1–1	Blackburn Rovers	Bristol
15:00 BST	Broadbent (yellow card) 61'; Clarke (yellow card) 63'; Lines 90+4'	Report	Mulgrew 65' (pen.); Lenihan (yellow card) 83'	Stadium: Memorial Stadium; Attendance: 10,029; Referee: Kevin Johnson

19 April 2018 43	Blackburn Rovers	3–1	Peterborough United	Blackburn
19:45 BST	Dack 54', 90+4', (yellow card) 90+5'; Evans (yellow card) 78'; Graham 83'	Report	Edwards (yellow card) 36'; Mulgrew 44' (o.g.); Anderson (yellow card) 90'	Stadium: Ewood Park; Attendance: 11,679; Referee: Ross Joyce

24 April 2018 44	Doncaster Rovers	0-1	Blackburn Rovers	Doncaster
19:45 BST	Marquis (yellow card) 79'	Report	Mulgrew (yellow card) 46', (goal) 80'; Conway (yellow card) 55'	Stadium: Keepmoat Stadium; Attendance: 10,443; Referee: Eddie Ilderton

28 April 2018 45	Charlton Athletic	1-0	Blackburn Rovers	London
15:00 BST	Pearce 19'; Page (yellow card) 34'; Forster-Caskey (yellow card) 85'	Report	Payne (yellow card) 41'; Lenihan (yellow card) 65'; Smallwood (yellow card) 72'; Downing (yellow card) 90+5'	Stadium: The Valley; Attendance: 17,310; Referee: Robert Jones

5 May 2018 46	Blackburn Rovers	2-1	Oxford United	Blackburn
17:30 BST	Lenihan 12'; Payne 76'	Report	Eastwood (yellow card) 41'; Rothwell (yellow card) 61'; Henry 66'	Stadium: Ewood Park; Attendance: 27,600; Referee: Carl Boyeson

== EFL Cup ==
The first round draw of the EFL Cup took place on 16 June 2017 and Blackburn Rovers were drawn away to Coventry City. A home tie against Burnley was confirmed for the second round.

8 August 2017 First round	Coventry City	1–3	Blackburn Rovers	Coventry
19:45 BST	Nazon 22'; Camwell (yellow card) 28'	Report	Evans 16' (yellow card) 34'; Smallwood 33'; Samuel (yellow card) 53' (goal) 56'; Bennett (yellow card) 69'	Stadium: Ricoh Arena; Attendance: 5,372; Referee: Darren England

23 August 2017 Second round	Blackburn Rovers	0–2	Burnley	Blackburn
19:45 BST	Bennett (yellow card) 90'	Report	Cork 27'; Brady 45+5'; Bardsley (yellow card) 54'; Long (yellow card) 64'	Stadium: Ewood Park; Attendance: 16,313; Referee: Simon Hooper

== FA Cup ==
In the FA Cup, Blackburn Rovers would face Barnet at home in the first round and Crewe Alexandra at home in the second round.

4 November 2017 First round	Blackburn Rovers	3–1	Barnet	Blackburn
15:00 Greenwich Mean Time	Evans (yellow card) 60'; Nuttall 63'; Graham 70'; Antonsson 81'	Report	Akinola 31'	Stadium: Ewood Park; Attendance: 3,710; Referee: Carl Boyeson

3 December 2017 Second round	Blackburn Rovers	3–3	Crewe Alexandra	Blackburn
14:00 GMT	Samuel 11', 20'; Graham 15'; Harper (red card) 33'; Bennett (red card) 57'	Report	Walker (yellow card) 27'; Porter 35' (pen.), 66'; Nolan 63'; Ng (yellow card) 90'	Stadium: Ewood Park; Attendance: 4,472; Referee: David Webb

13 December 2017 (Note: On 12 December, both clubs agreed to reschedule the fixture 24 hours later due to adverse weather conditions.) Second round replay	Crewe Alexandra	0–1	Blackburn Rovers	Crewe
19:45 GMT		Report	Graham 24'; Harper (yellow card) 29'; Ward (yellow card) 89'	Stadium: Gresty Road; Attendance: 2,241; Referee: Anthony Backhouse

6 January 2018 Third round	Blackburn Rovers	0-1	Hull City	Blackburn
15:00 GMT	Williams (yellow card) 30'; Tomlinson (yellow card) 44'	Report	Aina 58' (yellow card) 71'	Stadium: Ewood Park; Attendance: 6,777; Referee: Oliver Langford

== EFL Trophy ==
The first round fixtures of the EFL Trophy (named Checkatrade Trophy for sponsorship reasons) are scheduled for week commencing Monday 28 August.

Blackburn entered the competition at the first round group stage and were drawn against Bury, Rochdale and Stoke City u23s in Northern Group C.

2017–18 EFL Trophy Group C Northern Section

=== Group C ===
Pos	Lge	Team	Pld	W	PW	PL	L	GF	GA	GD	Pts	Qualification
1	L1	Rochdale (Q)	3	1	1	1	0	5	1	+4	6	Round 2
2	L1	Bury (Q)	3	2	0	0	1	4	5	−1	6	Round 2
3	L1	Blackburn Rovers (E)	3	1	0	1	1	2	2	0	4	
4	ACA	Stoke City U21 (E)	3	0	1	0	2	1	4	−3	2	

Updated to match(es) played on 8 November 2017. Source: EFL.com
(E) Eliminated; (Q) Qualified to the phase indicated

29 August 2017	Blackburn Rovers	1–0	Stoke City U21s	Blackburn
19:45 BST	Nuttall 77'			Stadium: Ewood Park; Attendance: 1,501

3 October 2017	Blackburn Rovers	0–1	Bury	Blackburn
19:45 BST	Platt (yellow card) 64'; Hart (yellow card) 86'	Report	Skarz (yellow card) 40'; Williams (yellow card) 64'; Bunn 77'	Stadium: Ewood Park; Attendance: 2,025 (232 away); Referee: Scott Oldham

7 November 2017	Rochdale	1–1 (5–3 p)	Blackburn Rovers	Spotland
19:45 GMT	Slew 72'	Report	Wharton (red card) 28'; Hart (yellow card) 41'; Nuttall 43'	Stadium: Spotland Stadium; Attendance: 1,080; Referee: Antony Backhouse
	Penalties
	Rafferty (penalty scored); Inman (penalty scored); Slew (penalty scored); Gillam (penalty scored); Bunney (penalty scored)		Hart (penalty scored); Ward (penalty scored); Smallwood (penalty missed); Bennett (penalty scored)

== Backroom staff ==
Position	Staff
Manager	(England) Tony Mowbray
Assistant manager	(England) Mark Venus
First-team coach	(England) David Lowe
Goalkeeping coach	(England) Ben Benson
Head of Academy	(England) Stuart Jones
Head of Academy coaching	(England) Tony Carss
Under-23 lead coach	(Northern Ireland) Damien Johnson
Under-23 assistant coach	(England) David Dunn

Last updated: May 2017

== 1st Team squad statistics ==
=== Appearances and goals ===
As of 7 May 2018

No.	Pos	Nat	Player	Total		League One		FA Cup		EFL Cup		EFL Trophy	
No.	Pos	Nat	Player	Apps	Goals	Apps	Goals	Apps	Goals	Apps	Goals	Apps	Goals
1	GK	(Spain) ESP	David Raya	47	0	45+0	0	0+0	0	2+0	0	0+0	0
13	GK	(Canada) CAN	Jayson Leutwiler	5	0	1+0	0	4+0	0	0+0	0	0+0	0
37	GK	(England) ENG	Andy Fisher	3	0	0+0	0	0+0	0	0+0	0	3+0	0
2	DF	(Namibia) NAM	Ryan Nyambe	35	0	27+2	0	2+0	0	1+0	0	3+0	0
3	DF	(Republic of Ireland) IRL	Derrick Williams	51	1	45+0	1	3+0	0	2+0	0	1+0	0
14	DF	(Scotland) SCO	Charlie Mulgrew (C)	46	14	41+0	14	3+0	0	2+0	0	0+0	0
16	DF	(Scotland) SCO	Paul Caddis	20	0	13+1	0	4+0	0	2+0	0	0+0	0
17	DF	(England) ENG	Amari'i Bell	12	0	6+6	0	0+0	0	0+0	0	0+0	0
25	DF	(England) ENG	Paul Downing	30	1	26+2	1	1+1	0	0+0	0	0+0	0
26	DF	(Republic of Ireland) IRL	Darragh Lenihan	14	1	13+1	1	0+0	0	0+0	0	0+0	0
35	DF	(England) ENG	Lewis Travis	10	0	0+5	0	0+3	0	0+0	0	2+0	0
39	DF	(England) ENG	Matthew Platt	3	0	0+0	0	0+0	0	0+0	0	1+2	0
6	MF	(England) ENG	Richie Smallwood	52	3	46+0	2	1+1	0	2+0	1	1+1	0
8	MF	(England) ENG	Harry Chapman (on loan from Middlesbrough)	16	1	1+11	1	0+0	0	1+1	0	2+0	0
11	MF	(England) ENG	Peter Whittingham	23	0	14+6	0	0+0	0	1+0	0	2+0	0
19	MF	(England) ENG	Jack Payne (on loan from Huddersfield Town)	18	1	7+11	1	0+0	0	0+0	0	0+0	0
22	MF	(England) ENG	Ben Gladwin	11	0	0+5	0	1+0	0	1+1	0	3+0	0
23	MF	(England) ENG	Bradley Dack	45	18	37+5	18	1+2	0	0+0	0	0+0	0
28	MF	(England) ENG	Willem Tomlinson	7	0	0+4	0	2+0	0	0+0	0	1+0	0
29	MF	(Northern Ireland) NIR	Corry Evans	36	1	26+6	0	3+0	0	1+0	1	0+0	0
31	MF	(Jamaica) JAM	Elliott Bennett	47	2	40+1	2	2+1	0	1+1	0	1+0	0
32	MF	(Scotland) SCO	Craig Conway (VC)	28	2	19+5	2	2+0	0	0+1	0	1+0	0
42	MF	(England) ENG	Joe Rankin-Costello	1	0	0+0	0	0+0	0	0+0	0	0+1	0
43	MF	(Spain) ESP	Stefan Mols	1	0	0+0	0	0+0	0	0+0	0	0+1	0
44	MF	(England) ENG	Lewis Hardcastle	0	0	0+0	0	0+0	0	0+0	0	0+0	0
9	FW	(England) ENG	Dominic Samuel	41	8	19+17	5	2+0	2	1+1	1	1+0	0
10	FW	(England) ENG	Danny Graham	48	17	29+13	14	3+1	3	0+0	0	2+0	0
18	FW	(England) ENG	Adam Armstrong (on loan from Newcastle United)	22	9	17+5	9	0+0	0	0+0	0	0+0	0
20	FW	(Sweden) SWE	Marcus Antonsson (on loan from Leeds United)	33	8	22+8	7	1+1	1	1+0	0	0+0	0
38	FW	(England) ENG	Joe Nuttall	19	5	3+10	2	2+1	1	0+0	0	1+2	2
41	FW	(Wales) WAL	Lewis Mansell	0	0	0+0	0	0+0	0	0+0	0	0+0	0
45	FW	(England) ENG	Daniel Butterworth	0	0	0+0	0	0+0	0	0+0	0	0+0	0
Players out on loan:
5	DF	(England) ENG	Sam Hart (on loan at Rochdale)	7	0	0+3	0	1+1	0	0+0	0	2+0	0
7	MF	(England) ENG	Liam Feeney (on loan at Cardiff City)	4	0	0+1	0	0+0	0	2+0	0	1+0	0
15	DF	(England) ENG	Elliott Ward (on loan at Milton Keynes Dons)	15	0	9+1	0	2+0	0	2+0	0	1+0	0
34	DF	(England) ENG	Scott Wharton (on loan to Lincoln City)	2	0	0+0	0	1+0	0	0+0	0	1+0	0
36	DF	(England) ENG	Jack Doyle (on loan to Derry City)	2	0	0+0	0	0+0	0	0+1	0	1+0	0
Players that played for Blackburn Rovers this season that have left the club:
4	MF	(England) ENG	Rakeem Harper (on loan from West Bromwich Albion)	9	0	1+3	0	3+0	0	0+0	0	2+0	0

=== Goalscorers ===
As of 7 May 2018

Rank	No.	Pos.	Name	League	FA Cup	EFL Cup	EFL Trophy	Total
1	23	MF	(England) Bradley Dack	18	0	0	0	18
2	10	FW	(England) Danny Graham	14	3	0	0	17
3	14	DF	(Scotland) Charlie Mulgrew	14	0	0	0	14
4	18	FW	(England) Adam Armstrong	9	0	0	0	9
5	20	FW	(Sweden) Marcus Antonsson	7	1	0	0	8
=	9	FW	(England) Dominic Samuel	5	2	1	0	8
7	38	FW	(England) Joe Nuttall	2	1	0	2	5
8	6	MF	(England) Richie Smallwood	2	0	1	0	3
9	31	MF	(Jamaica) Elliott Bennett	2	0	0	0	2
=	32	MF	(Scotland) Craig Conway	2	0	0	0	2
11	3	DF	(Republic of Ireland) Derrick Williams	1	0	0	0	1
=	8	MF	(England) Harry Chapman	1	0	0	0	1
=	25	DF	(England) Paul Downing	1	0	0	0	1
=	29	MF	(Northern Ireland) Corry Evans	0	0	1	0	1
=	26	DF	(Republic of Ireland) Darragh Lenihan	1	0	0	0	1
=	19	MF	(England) Jack Payne	1	0	0	0	1
—	—	—	Own goal	2	0	0	0	2
Total				82	7	3	2	94

=== Disciplinary record ===
As of 7 May 2018

No.	Pos.	Name	League One			FA Cup			EFL Cup			EFL Trophy			Total		
No.	Pos.	Name	Yellow card	(yellow card) (red card)	Red card	Yellow card	(yellow card) (red card)	Red card	Yellow card	(yellow card) (red card)	Red card	Yellow card	(yellow card) (red card)	Red card	Yellow card	(yellow card) (red card)	Red card
1	GK	(Spain) David Raya	1	0	0	0	0	0	0	0	0	0	0	0	1	0	0
2	DF	(Namibia) Ryan Nyambe	5	0	0	0	0	0	0	0	0	0	0	0	5	0	0
3	DF	(Republic of Ireland) Derrick Williams	5	0	0	1	0	0	0	0	0	0	0	0	6	0	0
4	MF	(England) Rakeem Harper	0	0	0	1	0	1	0	0	0	0	0	0	1	0	1
5	DF	(England) Sam Hart	0	0	0	0	0	0	0	0	0	1	0	0	3	0	0
6	MF	(England) Richie Smallwood	11	0	0	0	0	0	0	0	0	0	0	0	11	0	0
8	MF	(England) Harry Chapman	3	0	0	0	0	0	0	0	0	0	0	0	3	0	0
9	FW	(England) Dominic Samuel	3	0	1	0	0	0	1	0	0	0	0	0	4	0	1
10	FW	(England) Danny Graham	1	0	0	0	0	0	0	0	0	0	0	0	1	0	0
11	MF	(England) Peter Whittingham	1	0	0	0	0	0	0	0	0	0	0	0	1	0	0
14	DF	(Scotland) Charlie Mulgrew	5	0	0	0	0	0	0	0	0	0	0	0	5	0	0
15	DF	(England) Elliott Ward	1	0	0	1	0	0	0	0	0	0	0	0	2	0	0
17	DF	(England) Amari'i Bell	1	0	0	0	0	0	0	0	0	0	0	0	1	0	0
19	MF	(England) Jack Payne	1	0	0	0	0	0	0	0	0	0	0	0	1	0	0
20	FW	(Sweden) Marcus Antonsson	1	0	0	0	0	0	0	0	0	0	0	0	1	0	0
23	MF	(England) Bradley Dack	7	0	0	0	0	0	0	0	0	0	0	0	7	0	0
25	DF	(England) Paul Downing	6	0	0	0	0	0	0	0	0	0	0	0	6	0	0
26	DF	(Republic of Ireland) Darragh Lenihan	4	0	0	0	0	0	0	0	0	0	0	0	4	0	0
28	MF	(England) Willem Tomlinson	0	0	0	1	0	0	0	0	0	0	0	0	1	0	0
29	MF	(Northern Ireland) Corry Evans	6	0	0	1	0	0	1	0	0	0	0	0	8	0	0
31	MF	(Jamaica) Elliott Bennett	5	1	0	0	0	1	2	0	0	0	0	0	7	1	1
32	MF	(Scotland) Craig Conway	1	0	0	0	0	0	0	0	0	0	0	0	1	0	0
34	DF	(England) Scott Wharton	0	0	0	0	0	0	0	0	0	0	0	1	0	0	1
35	DF	(England) Lewis Travis	0	0	1	0	0	0	0	0	0	0	0	0	0	0	1
38	FW	(England) Joe Nuttall	2	0	0	0	0	0	0	0	0	0	0	0	2	0	0
Total			62	1	2	5	0	2	4	0	0	1	0	1	72	1	5

== Transfers ==
=== Summer ===
==== Transfers in ====
Date from	Position	Nationality	Name	From	Fee	Ref.
27 May 2017	CF	(Scotland)	Kyle Connell	Motherwell	Undisclosed	
27 May 2017	CF	(American Samoa)	Callum Dolan	Manchester United	Undisclosed	
27 June 2017	CM	(England)	Bradley Dack	Gillingham	£750,000	
28 June 2017	CM	(England)	Ben Gladwin	Queens Park Rangers	Undisclosed	
1 July 2017	CM	(England)	Richie Smallwood	Rotherham United	Free	
1 July 2017	CM	(England)	Peter Whittingham	Cardiff City	Free	
19 July 2017	CF	(England)	Dominic Samuel	Reading	Undisclosed (~£500,000)	
20 July 2017	DF	(Scotland)	Paul Caddis	Free agent (Note: Caddis joined Rovers following his departure from Bury.)	Free	
22 July 2017	CF	(England)	Joe Nuttall	Free agent (Note: Nuttall joined Rovers following his release by Aberdeen.)	Free	
2 August 2017	GK	(Canada)	Jayson Leutwiler	Shrewsbury Town	Undisclosed	
13 August 2017	GF	(England)	Charlie Albinson	Free agent (Note: Albinson joined Rovers following his release by Manchester City.)	Free	
13 August 2017	GK	(Republic of Ireland)	Aaron Dillon	Free agent (Note: Dillon joined Rovers following his release by Galway United.)	Free	
31 August 2017	DF	(England)	Sam Hart	Liverpool	Undisclosed	

Total outgoing: +/- ~£1,250,000 (undisclosed fee)

==== Transfers out ====
Date from	Position	Nationality	Name	To	Fee	Ref.
1 July 2017	CM	(Nigeria)	Hope Akpan	Burton Albion (Note: Akpan joined Burton Albion following his release.)	Released	
1 July 2017	LB	(England)	Joshua Askew	Salford City (Note: Askew joined Salford City following his release.)	Released	
1 July 2017	CB	(England)	Wes Brown	(India) Kerala Blasters (Note: Brown joined Kerala Blasters following his release.)	Released	
1 July 2017	CB	(Scotland)	Gordon Greer	Kilmarnock (Note: Greer joined Kilmarnock following his release.)	Released	
1 July 2017	CM	(England)	Danny Guthrie	(Indonesia) Mitra Kukar (Note: Guthrie joined Mitra Kukar following his release.)	Released	
1 July 2017	RB	(Wales)	Adam Henley	(United States) Real Salt Lake (Note: Henley joined Real Salt Lake following his release.)	Released	
1 July 2017	LW	(England)	Ramirez Howarth	Skelmersdale United (Note: Howarth joined Skelmersdale United following his release.)	Released	
1 July 2017	CM	(England)	Jason Lowe	Birmingham City (Note: Lowe joined Birmingham City following his release.)	Released	
1 July 2017	LB	(Wales)	Ben Williams	Barnsley (Note: William joined Barnsley following his release.)	Released	
1 July 2017	CM	(England)	Connor Mahoney	Bournemouth (Note: Mahoney joined Bournemouth following his rejection of a new contract offer.)	£425,000 (+ add ons tribunal)	
1 July 2017	CF	(Scotland)	Callum Hendry	St Johnstone (Note: Hendry joined St Johnstone following his release.)	Released	
12 July 2017	RW	(England)	Tre Pemberton	Stoke City (Note: Pemberton joined Stoke City following his release.)	Released	
21 July 2017	CF	(Republic of Ireland)	Anthony Stokes	Hibernian (Note: Stokes joined Hibernian following his release.)	Mutual Consent	
26 July 2017	GK	(England)	Jason Steele	Sunderland	Undisclosed fee	

Total incoming: +/- ~£ £425,000 + further Undisclosed fee's ( * Connor Mahoney transfer fee £425,000 as determined by tribunal including additional add on fee's – ** Jason Steele transfer Undisclosed, however estimated to be around £560,000 with add ons.)

==== Loans in ====
Date from	Position	Nationality	Name	From	Length	Ref.
4 August 2017	MF	(England)	Harry Chapman	Middlesbrough	Season-long	
11 August 2017	CF	(Sweden)	Marcus Antonsson	Leeds United	Season-long	
31 August 2017	CM	(England)	Rekeem Harper	West Bromwich Albion	Season-long (recalled 2 January 2018) (Note: On 2 January 2018, West Brom recalled Harper.)	
31 August 2017	DF	(England)	Paul Downing	Milton Keynes Dons	Season-long (signed permanently) (Note: On 8 January 2018, Rovers signed Downing permanently.)	

==== Loans out ====
Date from	Position	Nationality	Name	To	Length	Ref.
31 August 2017	MF	(England)	Liam Feeney	Cardiff City	5-month loan (extended) (Note: On 5 January 2018, Cardiff extended the loan until the end of the season.)	

=== Winter ===
==== Transfers in ====
Date from	Position	Nationality	Name	To	Fee	Ref.
8 January 2018	DF	(England)	Paul Downing	Milton Keynes Dons	Undisclosed	
19 January 2018	DF	(England)	Amari'i Bell	Fleetwood Town	Undisclosed	
14 February 2018	FW	(England)	Okera Simmonds	Liverpool	Undisclosed	
17 February 2018	GK	(England)	Oliver Byrne	Cardiff City	Free	

==== Transfers out ====
Date from	Position	Nationality	Name	To	Fee	Ref.
31 January 2018	CM	(England)	Connor Thomson	FC Halifax Town (Note: Thomson joined FC Halifax Town following his release.)	Contract Mutually Terminated	
31 January 2018	RW	(England)	Callum Wright	Leicester City	Undisclosed Fee	

==== Loans in ====
Date from	Position	Nationality	Name	To	Length	Ref.
9 January 2018	FW	(England)	Adam Armstrong	Newcastle United	Season-long	
16 January 2018	MF	(England)	Jack Payne	Huddersfield Town	Season-long	

==== Loans out ====
Date from	Position	Nationality	Name	To	Length	Ref.
17 January 2018	DF	(England)	Sam Hart	Rochdale	6-month loan	
30 January 2018	DF	(England)	Elliott Ward	Milton Keys Dons	6-month loan	
31 January 2018	DF	(England)	Scott Wharton	Lincoln City	6-month loan	
14 February 2018	GK	(Republic of Ireland)	Aaron Dillon	(Republic of Ireland) Bray Wanderers	5-month loan	
22 February 2018	DF	(England)	Jack Doyle	(Republic of Ireland) Derry City	5-month loan	
