= Ryan Nyambe =

Namibian footballer (born 1997)

Personal information
- Full name: Ryan Simasiku Nyambe
- Date of birth: 4 December 1997 (age 28)
- Place of birth: Katima Mulilo, Namibia
- Height: 1.82 m (6 ft 0 in)
- Position: Defender

Team information
- Current team: Derby County
- Number: 24

Youth career
- 2011–2015: Blackburn Rovers

Senior career*
Years	Team	Apps	(Gls)
2015–2022	Blackburn Rovers	183	(0)
2022–2023	Wigan Athletic	31	(0)
2023–	Derby County	52	(1)
2026	→ Reading (loan)	19	(0)

International career^{‡}
2019–	Namibia	17	(0)
- * Club domestic league appearances and goals as of 22:04, 6 November 2026 (UTC) ‡ National team caps and goals as of 17:34, 21 January 2024 (UTC)

Ryan Nyambe (born 4 December 1997) is a Namibian professional footballer who plays as a defender for EFL Championship club Derby County.

He previously played for Blackburn Rovers and Wigan Athletic, before joining Derby. At Blackburn and Derby, Nyambe gained promotions to the Championship by finishing in second-place in League One both times in 2018 with Blackburn and 2024 at Derby. Nyambe is also an international footballer for the Namibia national team. He had a loan spell at Reading from Derby County during January to May 2026.

== Early life ==
Nyambe was born in Katima Mulilo, Namibia, raised by his aunt and uncle in the absence of his mother, who had moved to England in search of education. He moved to Manchester to join her at the age of ten in 2008.

== Club career ==
=== Blackburn Rovers ===
Having previously played football for his school whilst living in Namibia, he joined a local team shortly after moving to England before joining the Blackburn Rovers academy in 2011 aged 13.

On 1 July 2015, it was announced that Nyambe had signed his first professional deal, agreeing to a three-year deal with Blackburn that would run until 30 June 2018. Just over a month later, on 11 August, Nyambe made his professional debut, being named in Blackburn's starting-eleven for their first round EFL Cup fixture against League One side Shrewsbury Town. Nyambe assisted Nathan Delfouneso's 30th-minute equaliser, although Blackburn went on to lose the game 2–1, and were ultimately knocked out of the cup.

On 19 November 2016, Nyambe made his league debut for Blackburn, coming on as a 77th-minute substitution for Danny Graham in a 3–2 Championship victory over Brentford. His first league start came two weeks later, on 3 December, in a 1–1 draw with Huddersfield Town. Despite the 2016–17 season being one to forget, as Blackburn were relegated to League One, Nyambe came away from the season with 31 competitive appearances and the club's Young Player of the Year award.

On 21 July 2017, it was announced that Nyambe had agreed a new three-year deal with the club, with the optional for a further 12-months. Nyambe helped Blackburn achieve promotion back to the Championship after finishing runners-up to Wigan Athletic in League One at the end of the 2017–18 season. Nyambe made 35 appearances in all competitions for the club, despite suffering a hamstring injury in March 2018. Reflecting on Blackburn's promotion, Nyambe stated: "I'm very proud and it was great to enjoy the occasion with the fans."

On 23 April 2019, Blackburn announced that Nyambe had signed a new two-year contract with the club, with the option for an additional year that would see the player's stay at Blackburn be extended until the summer of 2022.

=== Wigan Athletic ===
Following the expiry of his contract with Blackburn, Nyambe joined Wigan Athletic on a one-year deal.

=== Derby County ===
On 19 September 2023, following his release from Wigan Athletic, Nyambe joined Derby County on a deal until January 2024, with the option to extend. Nyambe made his debut for Derby in a 2–0 win at Carlisle United on 23 September 2023. In his first month at the club, Nyambe became a regular starter at the right-back role for Derby and earned praise for his performances, Nyambe himself expected to improve further as he regained fitness which he lost as a free agent. On 25 December 2023, after making 11 league appearances, Nyambe signed a contract extension with Derby until June 2025. Nyambe would miss several games for Derby in January 2024, during his call up to the 2023 Africa Cup of Nations for Namibia. On 27 February 2024, Nyambe would pick up a quadriceps injury in a match against Charlton Athletic, in March it was confirmed that he had surgery on this injury and would be ruled out for remainder of the 2023–24 season, Nyambe made 21 appearances for Derby during the season. At the end of the season, Derby secured automatic promotion to the Championship with a second-place finish in League One.

On 4 July 2024, it was announced the Nyambe had signed a new three-year contract at Derby, extending his stay at Pride Park until June 2027. After playing in eleven of Derby's first twelve matches of the 2024–25 season, Nyambe would pick up a posterior cruciate ligament injury in Derby's match against Millwall on 19 October 2024 which would leave him on the sidelines for up to six months, Derby head coach Paul Warne said Nyambe was "heartbroken" by the injury. He returned from injury ahead of schedule in January 2025. On 2 April 2025. Nyambe broke the record for the most Championship appearances by an outfield player without ever scoring a goal during Derby's match against Preston North End on 2 April 2025 at 202 appearances. In the game, Nyambe would sustain a hamstring injury in the fourth minute of the match and was forced to leave the field, the injury ended Nyambe's season a month early with the defender making 19 appearances during his second season at Derby.

In June 2025, it was confirmed by Derby head coach John Eustace that Nyambe would miss the start of the 2025–26 season as he continued his recovery from his hamstring injury. Despite this, he did play in Derby's opening game of the season after a quicker than expected recovery. Nyambe struggled to break into the first team during the season, making seven league appearances for Derby County during the 2025–26 season.

Nyambe scored his first goal for Derby County on 6 November 2026, in a 3–1 win over Bolton Wanderers, it was his first goal in over 300 senior career appearances.

==== Reading (loan) ====
On 21 January 2026, Nyambe signed for Reading on a loan deal until the end of the season. Nyambe made 19 appearances during his loan spell at Reading, with the prospect of another spell at Reading described as "unlikely" at the end of the season.

== International career ==
Being eligible to represent both England and Namibia, Nyambe confirmed his commitment to play for Namibia, the country of his birth, at international level in May 2019. He was called up by Namibia for the first time in June, being selected for a warm-up friendly against Ghana on 9 June in Dubai, a game in which he made his international debut. Following the game, Namibia manager Ricardo Mannetti selected Nyambe as part of the squad for the 2019 Africa Cup of Nations.

He made his competitive debut for his national side in a group stage game against Morocco on 23 June. Despite the side losing 1–0, Nyambe was credited as having a man-of-the-match performance, despite playing in centre-back, as opposed to his usual right-back position. Nyambe featured in all of Namibia's group stage matches, with the country finishing at the bottom of its group, thus not progressing to the next stage of the tournament.

Missing the nation's three games that followed its Africa Cup of Nations campaign, Nyambe returned to the national team setup in November - being called up for the team's 2021 Africa Cup of Nations qualifiers against Chad and Guinea, games of which he played in both. After a year of being out of the Namibia setup due to the ongoing COVID-19 pandemic, Nyambe returned for his national side on 13 November 2020 for the nation's game against Chad, which it went on to lose 1–0. Nyambe would be faced with yet another year of being unable to play for Namibia, eventually returning in November 2021 for the side's 2022 World Cup qualifiers against Congo and Togo.

Nyambe was a part of Namibia's squad for the 2023 Africa Cup of Nations.

== Playing style ==
Nyambe has said that he models his playing style on that of Rio Ferdinand. He is primarily a right-back, but can also play at centre-back, a position which he often features in for Namibia, and also at left-back.

== Personal life ==
Nyambe is a Manchester United fan.

== Career statistics ==
=== Club ===
As of match played 6 November 2026

Appearances and goals by club, season and competition
Club	Season	League			FA Cup		League Cup		Other		Total	
Club	Season	Division	Apps	Goals	Apps	Goals	Apps	Goals	Apps	Goals	Apps	Goals
Blackburn Rovers	2015–16	Championship	0	0	0	0	1	0	—		1	0
Blackburn Rovers	2016–17	Championship	25	0	2	0	1	0	—		28	0
Blackburn Rovers	2017–18	League One	29	0	2	0	1	0	3 (Note: Appearances in EFL Trophy)	0	35	0
Blackburn Rovers	2018–19	Championship	29	0	1	0	3	0	—		33	0
Blackburn Rovers	2019–20	Championship	31	0	0	0	2	0	—		33	0
Blackburn Rovers	2020–21	Championship	38	0	0	0	1	0	—		39	0
Blackburn Rovers	2021–22	Championship	31	0	0	0	1	0	—		32	0
Blackburn Rovers	Total		183	0	5	0	10	0	3	0	201	0
Blackburn Rovers U23	2016–17	—			—		—		3	0	3	0
Wigan Athletic	2022–23	Championship	31	0	1	0	1	0	—		33	0
Derby County	2023–24	League One	19	0	1	0	0	0	1	0	21	0
Derby County	2024–25	Championship	17	0	0	0	2	0	—		19	0
Derby County	2025–26	Championship	7	0	0	0	0	0	—		7	0
Derby County	2026–27	Championship	9	1	0	0	0	0	—		9	1
Derby County	Total		52	1	1	0	2	0	1	0	56	1
Reading (loan)	2025–26	League One	19	0	—		—		—		19	0
Career total			284	1	7	0	13	0	7	0	309	1

=== International ===
As of match played 21 January 2024

Appearances and goals by national team and year
National team	Year	Apps	Goals
Namibia	2019	6	0
Namibia	2020	1	0
Namibia	2021	2	0
Namibia	2023	5	0
Namibia	2024	3	0
Total		17	0

== Honours ==
Blackburn Rovers

- EFL League One second-place promotion: 2017–18

Derby County

- EFL League One second-place promotion: 2023–24
