= Paul Caddis =

Scottish footballer

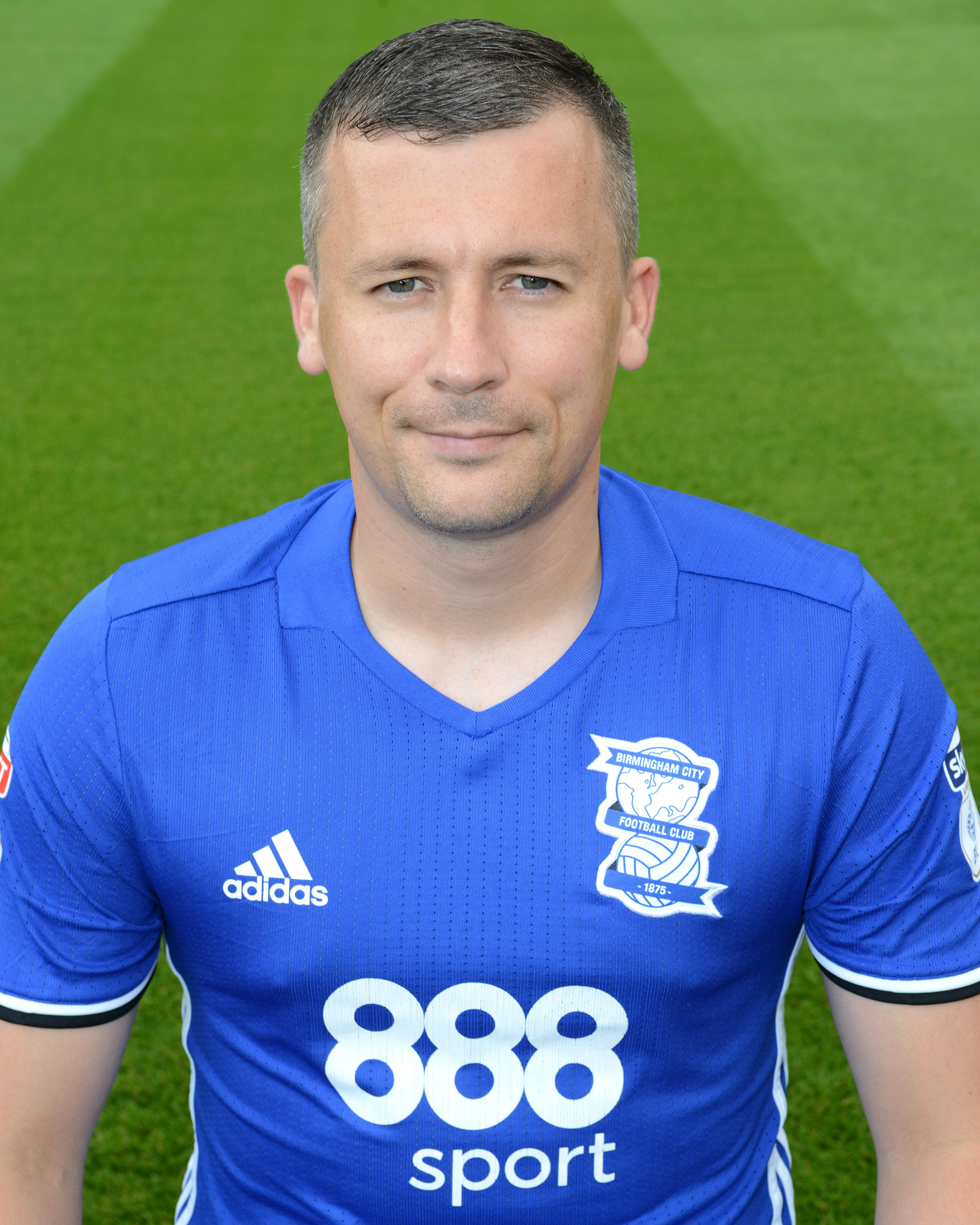
- Caddis in 2016

Personal information
- Full name: Paul McLean Caddis
- Date of birth: 19 April 1988 (age 38)
- Place of birth: Irvine, Scotland
- Height: 5 ft 7 in (1.70 m)
- Positions: Right back; midfielder

Team information
- Current team: King's Lynn Town (manager)

Youth career
- Ayrshire Rangers
- Rangers
- Celtic

Senior career*
| Years | Team | Apps | (Gls) |
| 2007–2010 | Celtic | 17 | (0) |
| 2009 | → Dundee United (loan) | 11 | (0) |
| 2010–2013 | Swindon Town | 77 | (5) |
| 2012–2013 | → Birmingham City (loan) | 27 | (0) |
| 2013–2017 | Birmingham City | 122 | (15) |
| 2017 | Bury | 13 | (0) |
| 2017–2018 | Blackburn Rovers | 14 | (0) |
| 2018–2019 | Bradford City | 27 | (1) |
| 2019–2021 | Swindon Town | 45 | (1) |
| Total | | 353 | (22) |

International career
| 2007 | Scotland U19 | 1 | (0) |
| 2008–2010 | Scotland U21 | 13 | (0) |
| 2016 | Scotland | 1 | (0) |

Managerial career
- 2023–2026: Hereford
- 2026–: King's Lynn Town
- * Club domestic league appearances and goals

Paul McLean Caddis (born 19 April 1988) is a Scottish football coach and former professional footballer who is head coach of King's Lynn Town. Caddis played in more than 350 professional matches at club level and represented his country at youth and senior levels. Having predominantly played as either a right back or right winger, he could also play as a left back or anywhere across the midfield, due to his versatility and his ability with both feet. He has played for both Celtic and Swindon Town in all positions, apart from striker and goalkeeper.

Caddis started his career with Scottish Premier League club Celtic. He broke into the first team during the 2007–08 season, but never managed to hold down a starting place over the next few years. He spent the second half of the 2008–09 season on loan to Dundee United. Caddis was sold to English League One club Swindon Town in August 2010. He spent the 2012–13 season on loan to Birmingham City, joined the club on a permanent contract in September 2013, and in the final match of that season, he scored the stoppage-time goal that saved the team from relegation from the Championship.

After three-and-a-half seasons in his second spell with Birmingham, his contract was cancelled by mutual consent in January 2017. A short spell with Bury of League One preceded a season with Blackburn Rovers and seven months with Bradford City. He rejoined Swindon Town in November 2019, played his last match in 2021, and announced his retirement a year later.

Caddis played regularly for the Scotland under-21 team and also captained the side. He made his full international debut for Scotland in 2016.

Having joined Fleetwood Town as an academy coach in 2021, he was then appointed as manager of Hereford in April 2023, in his first managerial role.

== Early and personal life ==
Paul Caddis was born in Irvine, North Ayrshire, on 19 April 1988 and attended St Joseph's Academy in Kilmarnock. His older brother, Ryan, and younger brother Liam played League football in Scotland football, and the youngest, Dylan, was on Kilmarnock's books as a youngster and played for Clyde in the Scottish Cup. In the 2016–17 season, all three of his brothers were playing together at Scottish junior club Ardrossan Winton Rovers. He is married with two daughters.

Caddis was playing youth football for Ayrshire Rangers when he was scouted by and signed for Rangers. He spent two years in Rangers' youth system before moving on to Celtic, the team he supported.

== Club career ==
=== Celtic ===
Caddis trained with the under-17s team at Celtic before moving to the under 19s, where he quickly became captain. He often trained with the Celtic first team. He made his competitive debut coming on as a substitute in Celtic's 1–0 victory away to Falkirk on 27 January 2008. He then made his first start just six days later against Kilmarnock at Rugby Park in the Scottish Cup. He assisted Scott McDonald for the first goal in the 5–1 victory. Caddis made his home debut on 20 February against Barcelona in the Champions League last 16 first leg fixture. He went on to play 17 times in the Scottish Premier League for Celtic.

Caddis appeared in Celtic's 3–3 Europa League draw with Rapid Vienna in December 2009.

==== Dundee United (loan) ====
On 2 February 2009, Caddis joined Dundee United on loan until the end of the season. The opportunity to develop under Craig Levein was a key factor in his decision. He made his debut against Inverness Caledonian Thistle on 14 February playing the full 90 minutes on the right wing as the game ended 1–1. He returned to Celtic after playing his last game for the Tangerines in a 3–0 defeat to Rangers on 24 May, having made 11 appearances for the club.

=== Swindon Town ===
In August 2010, Caddis and fellow Celtic youth team graduate Simon Ferry joined English League One club Swindon Town for an undisclosed fee. The 22-year-old Caddis, who said he left Celtic for regular first-team football, signed a three-year contract. Manager Danny Wilson commented favourably on his versatility, and played him in midfield as well as at full back. He made his debut in the Football League Cup against Leyton Orient, and made 42 appearances during the 2010–11 season as Swindon were relegated to League Two.

Caddis remained at Swindon for the 2011–12 season in League Two despite a number of players leaving the club after the relegation. Swindon began the season with new addition Oliver Risser as captain, but Caddis took the armband after Risser suffered an injury. Despite Risser's return to fitness, manager Paolo di Canio decided to name Caddis as captain for the remainder of the season. He was ever-present for most of the season, missing a handful of games in March and April – including the Football League Trophy final defeat – due to an ankle injury. He and Matt Ritchie were named in the League Two PFA Team of the Year as Swindon were promoted as champions. At the end of the season, he agreed an extension to his contract until 2014.

=== Birmingham City ===
On the last day of the August 2012 transfer window, Caddis joined Championship club Birmingham City on loan for the season. Birmingham striker Adam Rooney moved in the other direction, on loan for the season with a view to a permanent transfer. He produced a man-of-the-match performance on his debut the following day, in Birmingham's first league win of the season at home to Peterborough United. A dislocated shoulder sustained during his third game kept him out until late November.

In April 2013, BBC Sport reported that Birmingham's offer of £125,000 down and a further £125,000 in instalments had been rejected by Swindon because they were looking for around £275,000 cash. When Birmingham right-back Neal Eardley injured a knee just before the end of the summer transfer window, the club made a further bid for Caddis, who had remained out of favour at Swindon. The bid, reportedly in the region of £150,000 was accepted, and Caddis signed a three-year contract with Birmingham on 2 September. He became a regular in the side, and scored his first goals for Birmingham on 30 November in the first half of the league match at Barnsley, with a 25-yard (23 m) drive and a penalty. On the last day of the season, Birmingham needed at least a draw away at Bolton Wanderers and for other results to favour them to avoid relegation to League One. Two goals down with 12 minutes left, Nikola Žigić scored, and three minutes into stoppage time, his close-range header was cleared off the line to Caddis, who produced what he thought was his first ever headed goal to preserve Birmingham's second-tier status.

Caddis missed only one match in all competitions in 2014–15 – his 48 appearances were more than any of his teammates; he was the regular penalty-taker, and he captained the team when Paul Robinson was unavailable. The Birmingham Mail rated him one of the best attacking full backs in the division, praising his "delivery, support play and ability with a dead ball", and suggested that his assertiveness in defence was starting to improve. In 2015–16, Caddis lost the team captaincy to Michael Morrison, and was not an automatic selection at right back, but he still started 37 of the 46 league matches.

At the start of the 2016–17 season, manager Gary Rowett told Caddis he would not be involved with the first team until his fitness levels were good enough – an assessment with which the player disagreed. He played with the development squad to prove his fitness, but dislocated a shoulder while doing so, underwent surgery, and was out for three months. In January 2017, new manager Gianfranco Zola told Caddis he rated him behind Jonathan Spector and the youngster Josh Dacres-Cogley, but that if he wanted to stay at Birmingham and fight for his place it was his decision. On 26 January 2017, his contract was cancelled by mutual consent.

=== Bury ===
Caddis signed a short-term contract with League One club Bury on 25 February 2017. He went straight into the starting eleven for that day's 1–0 win away to Charlton Athletic, a result that continued a winning streak for Lee Clark, under whose management Caddis had been a first-team regular at Birmingham. He made 13 appearances in what remained of the season, helping his club narrowly avoid relegation. Although Clark wanted to keep him at the club, he chose not to extend his stay.

=== Blackburn Rovers ===
Following a trial spell during which manager Tony Mowbray assessed the player's fitness, Caddis signed a two-year contract with another League One club, Blackburn Rovers, in July 2017. After 21 appearances, the last of which was in the 2018–19 EFL Cup, his contract was terminated by mutual consent on 31 August 2018.

=== Bradford City ===
Caddis joined Bradford City of League One on trial in October 2018 after injuries left the club without a fit right back. On 16 November he signed a contract until the end of the 2018–19 season. He made his debut the following day, playing the whole of a 1–1 draw away to Peterborough United that put an end to the team's six-match losing streak. He scored his first goal for the club in a 4–4 draw with Peterborough in the FA Cup, but his shot was saved as his team were eliminated on penalties.

In February 2019, Caddis captained Bradford City for one match under caretaker manager Martin Drury before incoming manager Gary Bowyer appointed Hope Akpan in his place. Caddis went on to play in 27 league matches, mainly as a starter, as Bradford City were unable to avoid relegation to League Two. He was one of eleven players to be released when their contracts expired at the end of the season.

=== Return to Swindon Town ===
After training with the League Two club for a few weeks, Caddis rejoined Swindon Town on 15 November 2019 on a short-term contract. He made his first appearance the following day as the third of three stoppage-time substitutes in a 3–2 win away to Salford City that took Swindon top of the table, and soon established himself as a regular in the starting eleven. In January 2020 his contract was extended to the end of the 2020–21 season. He played more or less regularly for the duration of his contract, and was released when it expired in June 2021.

While waiting for new playing opportunities, Caddis started working towards coaching qualifications. He was given a job as an under-16s coach in League One club Fleetwood Town's academy in November 2021, and eventually, on 18 June 2022, he announced his retirement from professional football in order to focus on full-time coaching.

== International career ==
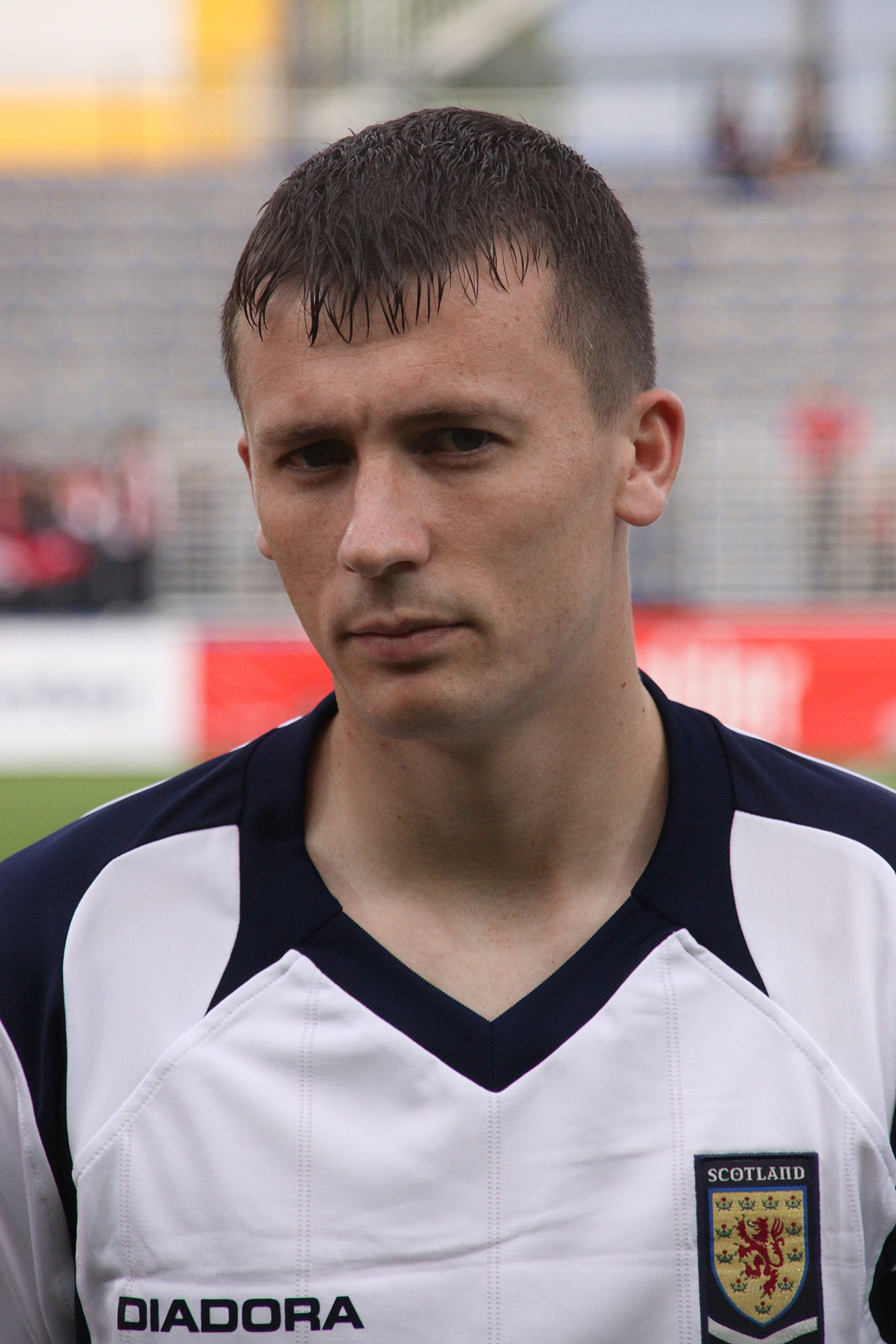
Caddis with Scotland under-21 side in 2009

Caddis played for the Scotland under-19 team and won 13 caps for the Scotland under-21s.

In March 2013, he was called into the senior squad as a late replacement to cover for the injured Russell Martin for the World Cup qualifier away to Serbia, but remained an unused substitute.

Caddis was next called up for a friendly against the Czech Republic on 24 March 2016, again as a late replacement. This time, he did make his senior debut, replacing goalscorer Ikechi Anya after 88 minutes as Scotland completed a 1–0 win.

== Managerial career ==
On 20 April 2023, Caddis was appointed as manager of National League North club Hereford, signing a two-year contract and officially taking charge from 1 May. After guiding Hereford to their highest ever finish and highest points total in the National League North in his first season, Caddis signed a one-year extension to his contract.

On 11 February 2026, Caddis was sacked with Hereford sitting in 23rd position, without a win in seven matches.

On 5 March 2026, Caddis was appointed manager of King's Lynn Town.

== Career statistics ==
=== Club ===
Appearances and goals by club, season and competition
| Club | Season | League | | | National Cup (Note: Includes Scottish Cup, FA Cup) | | League Cup (Note: Includes Scottish League Cup, Football League Cup/EFL Cup) | | Other | | Total | |
| Club | Season | Division | Apps | Goals | Apps | Goals | Apps | Goals | Apps | Goals | Apps | Goals |
|---|---|---|---|---|---|---|---|---|---|---|---|---|
| Celtic | 2006–07 | Scottish Premier League | 0 | 0 | 0 | 0 | 0 | 0 | 0 | 0 | 0 | 0 |
| Celtic | 2007–08 | Scottish Premier League | 2 | 0 | 1 | 0 | 0 | 0 | 1 (Note: Appearance in UEFA Champions League) | 0 | 4 | 0 |
| Celtic | 2008–09 | Scottish Premier League | 5 | 0 | 1 | 0 | 1 | 0 | 0 | 0 | 7 | 0 |
| Celtic | 2009–10 | Scottish Premier League | 10 | 0 | 1 | 0 | 1 | 0 | 1 (Note: Appearance in UEFA Europa League) | 0 | 13 | 0 |
| Celtic | Total | | 17 | 0 | 3 | 0 | 2 | 0 | 2 | 0 | 24 | 0 |
| Dundee United (loan) | 2008–09 | Scottish Premier League | 11 | 0 | — | | — | | — | | 11 | 0 |
| Swindon Town | 2010–11 | League One | 38 | 1 | 2 | 0 | 1 | 0 | 1 (Note: Appearances in Football League Trophy) | 0 | 42 | 1 |
| Swindon Town | 2011–12 | League Two | 39 | 4 | 4 | 0 | 2 | 0 | 5 | 1 | 50 | 5 |
| Swindon Town | Total | | 77 | 5 | 6 | 0 | 3 | 0 | 6 | 1 | 92 | 6 |
| Birmingham City (loan) | 2012–13 | Championship | 27 | 0 | 1 | 0 | 0 | 0 | — | | 28 | 0 |
| Birmingham City | 2013–14 | Championship | 38 | 5 | 2 | 0 | 2 | 0 | — | | 42 | 5 |
| Birmingham City | 2014–15 | Championship | 45 | 6 | 1 | 0 | 2 | 1 | — | | 48 | 7 |
| Birmingham City | 2015–16 | Championship | 39 | 4 | 0 | 0 | 1 | 0 | — | | 40 | 4 |
| Birmingham City | 2016–17 | Championship | 0 | 0 | 0 | 0 | 1 | 0 | — | | 1 | 0 |
| Birmingham City | Total | | 149 | 15 | 4 | 0 | 6 | 1 | — | | 159 | 16 |
| Bury | 2016–17 | League One | 13 | 0 | — | | — | | — | | 13 | 0 |
| Blackburn Rovers | 2017–18 | League One | 14 | 0 | 4 | 0 | 2 | 0 | 0 | 0 | 20 | 0 |
| Blackburn Rovers | 2018–19 | Championship | 0 | 0 | — | | 1 | 0 | — | | 1 | 0 |
| Blackburn Rovers | Total | | 14 | 0 | 4 | 0 | 3 | 0 | 0 | 0 | 21 | 0 |
| Bradford City | 2018–19 | League One | 27 | 1 | 2 | 1 | — | | — | | 29 | 2 |
| Swindon Town | 2019–20 | League Two | 19 | 0 | — | | — | | — | | 19 | 0 |
| Swindon Town | 2020–21 | League One | 26 | 1 | 1 | 0 | 0 | 0 | 1 (Note: Appearance in EFL Trophy) | 1 | 28 | 2 |
| Swindon Town | Total | | 45 | 1 | 1 | 0 | 0 | 0 | 1 | 1 | 47 | 2 |
| Career total | | | 353 | 22 | 20 | 1 | 14 | 1 | 9 | 2 | 396 | 26 |

== Managerial statistics ==
As of match played 10 March 2026

Managerial record by team and tenure
| Team | From | To | Record | | | | | | | | Ref. |
| Team | From | To | G | W | D | L | GF | GA | GD | Win % | Ref. |
|---|---|---|---|---|---|---|---|---|---|---|---|
| Hereford | 1 May 2023 | 11 February 2026 | 134 | 56 | 30 | 48 | 187 | 178 | +9 | 41.79 | |
| King's Lynn Town | 5 March 2026 | Present | 2 | 1 | 1 | 0 | 2 | 1 | +1 | 50.00 | |
| Total | | | 136 | 57 | 31 | 48 | 189 | 179 | +10 | 41.91 | |

== Honours ==
Swindon Town

- Football / EFL League Two: 2011–12, 2019–20

Blackburn Rovers

- EFL League One runner-up: 2017–18

Individual

- PFA Team of the Year: 2011–12 League Two
