= 2022–23 Derby County F.C. season =

Derby County
2022–23 season
- Owner: Clowes Developments
- Manager: Liam Rosenior (interim) (Until 22 September); Paul Warne (from 22 September)
- Stadium: Pride Park Stadium
- League One: 7th
- FA Cup: Fourth round
- EFL Cup: Third round
- EFL Trophy: Group stage
- Top goalscorer: League: David McGoldrick (22); All: David McGoldrick (25)
- Highest home attendance: 31,774 vs Portsmouth, 29 April 2023, League One
- Lowest home attendance: 3,688 vs Manchester City U21, 18 October 2022, EFL Trophy
- Average home league attendance: 27,259
- Biggest win: 5–0 vs Torquay United, 15 November 2022, FA vs Morecambe, 4 February 2023, League One
- Biggest defeat: 1–4 vs Barnsley, 25 February 2023, League One
Home colours	Away colours	Third colours

The 2022–23 season was the 139th season in the existence of Derby County Football Club and the club's first season in the third-tier of English football since the 1985–86 season following relegation in the previous season. In addition to the league, they also competed in the 2022–23 FA Cup, the 2022–23 EFL Cup and the 2022–23 EFL Trophy.

== Pre-season friendlies ==
On 22 June, the Rams announced their first two pre-season friendlies, against Bradford City and Stevenage. As well as two home friendly matches against Hertha BSC and Leicester City. On 20 July 2022, Derby County announced they would travel to play Alfreton Town in their final pre-season fixture.

9 July 2022 Friendly	Bradford City	0–2	Derby County	Bradford
15:00 BST		Report	Forsyth 14'; Barkhuizen 45+3'	Stadium: Valley Parade; Attendance: 4,218

16 July 2022 Friendly	Derby County	1–0	(Germany) Hertha BSC	Derby
16:00 BST	Mendez-Laing 38'	Report		Stadium: Pride Park Stadium; Attendance: 7,043

19 July 2022 Friendly	Stevenage	1–0	Derby County	Stevenage
19:30 BST	List 31'	Report		Stadium: Lamex Stadium

23 July 2022 Friendly	Derby County	1–3	Leicester City	Derby
16:00 BST	Barkhuizen 65'	Report	Iheanacho 55'; Daka 79'; Wright 86'	Stadium: Pride Park Stadium; Attendance: 9,805

26 July 2022 Friendly	Alfreton Town	2–1	Derby County	Alfreton
19:45 BST	Preston 12'; Southwell 52'	Report	Robertson 66'	Stadium: Impact Arena; Attendance: 3,105

== Competitions ==
=== Overall record ===
Competition	First match	Last match	Starting round	Final position	Record							
Competition	First match	Last match	Starting round	Final position	Pld	W	D	L	GF	GA	GD	Win %
League One	30 July 2022	7 May 2023	Matchday 1	7th	46	21	13	12	67	46	+21	45.65
FA Cup	5 November 2022	30 January 2023	First round	Fourth round	5	3	1	1	12	5	+7	60.00
EFL Cup	9 August 2022	9 November 2022	First round	Third round	3	2	1	0	3	1	+2	66.67
EFL Trophy	30 August 2022	18 October 2022	Group stage	Group Stage	3	1	1	1	5	5	+0	33.33
Total					57	27	16	14	87	57	+30	47.37

Last updated: 7 May 2023
Source: [Soccerway]

=== League One ===
==== League table ====
Pos	Team	Pld	W	D	L	GF	GA	GD	Pts	Promotion, qualification or relegation
4	Barnsley	46	26	8	12	80	47	+33	86	Qualification for League One play-offs
5	Bolton Wanderers	46	23	12	11	62	36	+26	81	Qualification for League One play-offs
6	Peterborough United	46	24	5	17	75	54	+21	77	Qualification for League One play-offs
7	Derby County	46	21	13	12	67	46	+21	76	
8	Portsmouth	46	17	19	10	61	50	+11	70	
9	Wycombe Wanderers	46	20	9	17	59	51	+8	69	
10	Charlton Athletic	46	16	14	16	70	66	+4	62	

Source: EFL Official Website
Rules for classification: 1) Points; 2) Goal difference; 3) Number of goals scored; 4) Head-to-head results; 5) Wins; 6) Away goals; 7) Penalty points (sec 9.5); 8) 12-point sending off offences

==== Results summary ====
Overall								Home						Away					
Pld	W	D	L	GF	GA	GD	Pts	W	D	L	GF	GA	GD	W	D	L	GF	GA	GD
46	21	13	12	67	46	+21	76	13	6	4	40	20	+20	8	7	8	27	26	+1

Last updated: 29 April 2023.
Source: [Soccerway]

==== Results by matchday ====
Matchday	1	2	3	4	5	6	7	8	9	10	11	12	13	14	15	16	17	18	19	20	21	22	23	24	25	26	27	28	29	30	31	32	33	34	35	36	37	38	39	40	41	42	43	44	45	46
Ground	H	A	H	A	A	H	H	A	H	A	H	A	A	H	H	A	A	A	H	A	H	A	H	H	A	H	A	H	A	H	H	A	H	H	A	A	H	A	H	A	H	A	A	H	H	A
Result	W	L	W	D	D	W	L	L	W	W	L	W	L	D	W	D	W	D	D	D	W	D	W	W	W	W	W	W	L	D	W	L	W	D	L	W	L	L	L	W	D	D	W	W	D	L
Position	6	13	7	7	8	6	9	13	7	8	10	9	10	10	7	7	6	8	7	7	6	6	5	4	4	4	4	4	5	5	5	6	5	5	6	5	5	6	7	7	7	7	7	6	6	7

Updated to match(es) played on 29 April 2023. Source: [Soccerway]
A = Away; H = Home; W = Win; D = Draw; L = Loss

==== Matches ====
On 23 June, the league fixtures were announced.

30 July 2022 1	Derby County	1–0	Oxford United	Derby
15:00 BST	Hourihane (yellow card) 47', (goal) 80'; Collins (yellow card) 55'; Mendez-Laing (yellow card) 82'; Curtis Davies (yellow card) 90+7'	Report	Seddon (yellow card) 28'; Browne (yellow card) 51'	Stadium: Pride Park Stadium; Attendance: 31,053; Referee: Anthony Backhouse

6 August 2022 2	Charlton Athletic	1–0	Derby County	Charlton
15:00 BST	Blackett-Taylor 62'; Sessegnon (yellow card) 73'; Morgan (yellow card) 76'	Report	Mendez-Laing (yellow card) 51'	Stadium: The Valley; Attendance: 17,046; Referee: Christopher Pollard

13 August 2022 3	Derby County	2–1	Barnsley	Derby
15:00 BST	McCarthy 8' (o.g.); Mendez-Laing 35'; Cashin (yellow card) 47'	Report	McCarthy (yellow card) 62'; Benson 64'	Stadium: Pride Park Stadium; Attendance: 26,123; Referee: Peter Wright

16 August 2022 4	Shrewsbury Town	0–0	Derby County	Shrewsbury
19:45 BST	Bayliss (yellow card) 75'; Flanagan (yellow card) 77'; Nurse (yellow card) 89'	Report	Knight (yellow card) 90+2'	Stadium: Montgomery Waters Meadow; Attendance: 7,867; Referee: Scott Oldham

20 August 2022 5	Fleetwood Town	0–0	Derby County	Fleetwood
15:00 BST	Rooney (yellow card) 85'	Report	Hourihane (yellow card) 60'	Stadium: Highbury Stadium; Attendance: 3,808; Referee: Ross Joyce

27 August 2022 6	Derby County	2–1	Peterborough United	Derby
15:00 BST	Stearman (yellow card) 64'; Cashin (yellow card) 69'; Knight 88'; McGoldrick 90+2'	Report	Taylor (yellow card) 26'; Thompson (yellow card) 30' (yellow-red card) 56'; Burrows (yellow card) 41'; Knight 69'	Stadium: Pride Park Stadium; Attendance: 26,414; Referee: Bobby Madden

3 September 2022 7	Derby County	2–3	Plymouth Argyle	Derby
15:00 BST	Collins 26'; Mendez-Laing 38'; McGoldrick (yellow card) 57'	Report	Mumba (yellow card) 34'; Whittaker 56'; Cosgrove 77', 90'	Stadium: Pride Park Stadium; Attendance: 27,173; Referee: Ollie Yates

10 September 2022	Morecambe	Postponed	Derby County	Morecambe
15:00 BST				Stadium: Mazuma Stadium
Note: Fixture was postponed as a mark of respect following the passing of Queen Elizabeth II.

13 September 2022 8	Lincoln City	2–0	Derby County	Lincoln
19:45 BST	Diamond 12' (pen.); Roughan (yellow card) 57'; Rushworth (yellow card) 65'; House 68'; O'Connor (yellow card) 81'	Report	Hourihane (yellow card) 51'; Cashin (yellow card) 54'	Stadium: LNER Stadium; Attendance: 9,622; Referee: Thomas Kirk

17 September 2022 9	Derby County	2–1	Wycombe Wanderers	Derby
15:00 BST	Hourihane (yellow card) 66', (goal) 72', 86'	Report	Tafazolli (yellow card) 14'; Mehmeti 15'; Vokes (yellow card) 68'	Stadium: Pride Park Stadium; Attendance: 24,784; Referee: Sam Barrott

24 September 2022	Derby County	Postponed	Cheltenham Town	Derby
15:00 BST				Stadium: Pride Park Stadium
Note: Fixture was postponed due to international call-ups within the squad.

1 October 2022 10	Cambridge United	0–2	Derby County	Cambridge
15:00 BST		Report	Collins 45' 83'; Osula (yellow card) 90+5'	Stadium: The Abbey Stadium; Attendance: 6,813; Referee: Simon Mather

8 October 2022 11	Derby County	1–2	Port Vale	Derby
15:00 BST	Collins 5' (red card) 58'; Stearman (yellow card) 54'	Report	Conlon (penalty missed) 15'; Harrison 55' (pen.) (yellow card) 57'; Wilson 66'; Jones (yellow card) 78'; Garrity (yellow card) 86'	Stadium: Pride Park Stadium; Attendance: 28,706; Referee: Sam Allison

15 October 2022 12	Accrington Stanley	0–3	Derby County	Accrington
15:00 BST	McConville (penalty missed) 36' (penalty missed) 38'; Tharme (yellow card) 51'	Report	Osula 15' 39'; Cashin (yellow card) 28'; Davies (yellow card) 37'; Barkhuizen 90+8'	Stadium: Wham Stadium; Attendance: 4,879; Referee: Will Finnie

21 October 2022 13	Ipswich Town	1–0	Derby County	Ipswich
20:00 BST	Morsy (yellow card) 10'; Burns 67'; Jackson (penalty missed) 85'; Woolfenden (yellow card) 90+7'	Report	Chester (yellow card) 23'; Smith (yellow card) 51'	Stadium: Portman Road; Attendance: 28,415; Referee: Lee Swabey

25 October 2022 14	Derby County	0–0	Exeter City	Derby
19:45 BST	Smith (yellow card) 17'; Sibley (yellow card) 37'	Report	Collins (yellow card) 38'; Caprice (yellow card) 70'; Jay (yellow card) 77'	Stadium: Pride Park Stadium; Attendance: 24,640; Referee: Adam Herczeg

29 October 2022 15	Derby County	4–2	Bristol Rovers	Derby
15:00 BST	McGoldrick 5', 24', 40' (yellow card) 59'; Collins 12'; Hourihane (yellow card) 34'; Roberts (yellow card) 72'; Wildsmith (yellow card) 90'	Report	Gordon (yellow card) 23'; Thomas 35'; Evans 45+3'	Stadium: Pride Park Stadium; Attendance: 27,841; Referee: Martin Coy

1 November 2022 16	Morecambe	1–1	Derby County	Morecambe
19:45 GMT	Weir 45+2'; Watts (yellow card) 53'; Ripley (yellow card) 81'	Report	Collins (penalty missed) 38'; McGoldrick (yellow card) 41' (penalty missed) 48'; Sibley 59'; Cashin (yellow card) 81'	Stadium: Mazuma Stadium; Attendance: 5,157; Referee: Marc Edwards

12 November 2022 17	Milton Keynes Dons	1–3	Derby County	Milton Keynes
15:00 GMT	Barry 41'; Harvie (yellow card) 45+1'; Lewington (yellow card) 46'; Dennis (yellow card) 90+2'	Report	Mendez-Laing (yellow card) 39' (goal) 79'; Roberts 43'; Collins 53'; Rooney (yellow card) 67'; Wildsmith (yellow card) 77'	Stadium: Stadium MK; Attendance: 13,950; Referee: James Linington

18 November 2022 18	Portsmouth	0–0	Derby County	Portsmouth
20:00 GMT	Robertson (yellow card) 12'; Bishop (yellow card) 71'	Report	Sibley (yellow card) 38'; Cashin (yellow card) 63'; Thompson (yellow card) 73'; Dobbin (yellow card) 90+1'	Stadium: Fratton Park; Attendance: 18,623; Referee: Neil Hair

3 December 2022 19	Derby County	0–0	Sheffield Wednesday	Derby
12:30 GMT	Dobbin (yellow card) 52'; Bird (yellow card) 64'	Report		Stadium: Pride Park Stadium; Attendance: 28,192; Referee: Dean Whitestone

10 December 2022 20	Burton Albion	1–1	Derby County	Burton upon Trent
14:00 GMT	Adeboyejo 79'	Report	Collins 23'; Roberts (yellow card) 46'; Cashin (yellow card) 71'	Stadium: Pirelli Stadium; Attendance: 5,922; Referee: Geoff Eltringham

17 December 2022 21	Derby County	4–0	Forest Green Rovers	Derby
15:00 GMT	Mendez-Laing 5'; McGoldrick 21', 69', 87'; Collins (yellow card) 43'; Barkhuizen (yellow card) 54'; Sibley (yellow card) 63'	Report		Stadium: Pride Park Stadium; Attendance: 24,334; Referee: Ross Joyce

27 December 2022 22	Bolton Wanderers	0–0	Derby County	Horwich
15:00 GMT	Bradley (yellow card) 61'; Aimson (yellow card) 89'	Report	Forsyth (yellow card) 26'	Stadium: University of Bolton Stadium; Attendance: 25,428; Referee: Sam Barrott

30 December 2022 23	Derby County	1–0	Cambridge United	Derby
19:45 GMT	Sibley (yellow card) 35'; Dobbin 57'; Smith (yellow card) 90+3'	Report	Brophy (yellow card) 76'; Janneh (yellow card) 81'; Williams (yellow card) 89'	Stadium: Pride Park Stadium; Attendance: 26,954; Referee: Will Finnie

2 January 2023 24	Derby County	4–0	Accrington Stanley	Derby
15:00 GMT	Barkhuizen 7', 46'; Smith (yellow card) 11'; Hourihane 16'; Sibley (yellow card) 29'; McGoldrick 45+2' (pen.); Forsyth (yellow card) 62'; Osula (red card) 79'	Report	Whalley (yellow card) 13'; Rodgers (yellow card) 21'; Fernandes (yellow card) 35'	Stadium: Pride Park Stadium; Attendance: 26,816; Referee: Martin Woods

14 January 2023 25	Cheltenham Town	2–3	Derby County	Cheltenham
15:00 GMT	Taylor 2'; Ferry (yellow card) 57'; Williams (yellow card) 68'; May 77'	Report	Hourihane 8'; Bird 11'; Forsyth (yellow card) 19'; Barkhuizen 55'; Collins (yellow card) 84'	Stadium: Whaddon Road; Attendance: 5,666; Referee: Neil Hair

21 January 2023 26	Derby County	2–1	Bolton Wanderers	Derby
15:00 GMT	Mendez-Laing 16'; Hourihane (yellow card) 45+1' (goal) 72'	Report	Johnston (yellow card) 16'; Sadlier 90+3'	Stadium: Pride Park Stadium; Attendance: 30,004; Referee: Jeremy Simpson

24 January 2023 27	Port Vale	1–2	Derby County	Burslem
19:45 GMT	Politic (yellow card) 2'; Ojo 56'	Report	McGoldrick 87'; Mendez-Laing 89' (yellow card) 89'	Stadium: Vale Park; Attendance: 10,307; Referee: Ben Toner

4 February 2023 28	Derby County	5–0	Morecambe	Derby
15:00 GMT	McGoldrick 45', 47', 50' (pen.); Collins 66' (pen.); Knight 69'	Report	Gibson (yellow card) 25'; Simeu (yellow card) 44'; Love (yellow card) 90+5'	Stadium: Pride Park Stadium; Attendance: 26,035; Referee: Craig Hicks

11 February 2023 29	Wycombe Wanderers	3–2	Derby County	High Wycombe
15:00 GMT	Vokes 11'; Hanlan (yellow card) 37'; Wing 77', 86'; Obita (yellow card) 85'; Stryjek (yellow card) 89'	Report	Collins 66', (yellow card) 90'; Forsyth (yellow card) 70'; Dobbin 89'	Stadium: Adams Park; Attendance: 7,167; Referee: Robert Lewis

14 February 2023 30	Derby County	1–1	Lincoln City	Derby
19:45 GMT	Knight (yellow card) 12'; Hourihane 69'	Report	House (yellow card) 21' (yellow-red card) 55'; O'Connor (yellow card) 40'; Shodipo 43'	Stadium: Pride Park Stadium; Attendance: 25,829; Referee: Scott Oldham

18 February 2023 31	Derby County	2–0	Charlton Athletic	Derby
15:00 GMT	McGoldrick 9' (pen.); Barkhuizen (yellow card) 31'; Cashin 69'	Report	Clare (yellow card) 4'; Hector (yellow card) 9'; Dobson (yellow card) 68'	Stadium: Pride Park Stadium; Attendance: 27,460; Referee: Paul Howard

25 February 2023 32	Barnsley	4–1	Derby County	Barnsley
15:00 GMT	Cole 21', 45+2'; Phillips 33'; B. Thomas (yellow card) 67'; Kitching (yellow card) 71'; Kane (yellow card) 75'; L. Thomas 90+4'	Report	McGoldrick 35'	Stadium: Oakwell Stadium; Attendance: 17,145; Referee: Bobby Madden

28 February 2023 33	Derby County	2–0	Cheltenham Town	Derby
19:45 GMT	McGoldrick 43'; White (yellow card) 59'; Dobbin 67'; Sibley (yellow card) 87'	Report	Jackson (yellow card) 26'; Rea (yellow card) 55'; Bonds (yellow card) 56'	Stadium: Pride Park Stadium; Attendance: 23,822 (344 Cheltenham Town supporters); Referee: Rebecca Welch

5 March 2023 34	Derby County	2–2	Shrewsbury Town	Derby
15:00 GMT	McGoldrick (yellow card) 19', (goal) 45+1'; Roberts 20'; Forsyth (yellow card) 48'; Cashin (yellow card) 54'	Report	Leahy (yellow card) 15', (goal) 72' (pen.); Moore (yellow card) 38'; Bayliss 49'	Stadium: Pride Park Stadium; Attendance: 22,761 (2,251 Shrewsbury Town supporters); Referee: Simon Mather

7 March 2023 35	Plymouth Argyle	2–1	Derby County	Plymouth
19:45 GMT	Wilson (yellow card) 19'; Wright 59'; Hardie 70' (pen.); Matete (yellow card) 89'	Report	Mendez-Laing 17'; Knight (yellow card) 90+4'	Stadium: Home Park; Attendance: 16,461; Referee: Charles Breakspear

11 March 2023 36	Oxford United	2–3	Derby County	Littlemore
15:00 GMT	Long 14'; Brown (yellow card) 39'; Joseph 90'	Report	Sibley 23', 40'; Smith (yellow card) 59'; Long 61' (o.g.)	Stadium: The Kassam Stadium; Attendance: 9,706; Referee: Marc Edwards

18 March 2023 37	Derby County	0–2	Fleetwood Town	Derby
15:00 GMT	Davies (yellow card) 45+3'; Knight (yellow card) 74'	Report	Wildsmith 11' (o.g.); Mendes Gomes 30'; Ndaba (yellow card) 50'; Warrington (yellow card) 57'; Stockley (yellow card) 74'	Stadium: Pride Park Stadium; Attendance: 25,476; Referee: Seb Stockbridge

25 March 2023 38	Peterborough United	2–0	Derby County	Peterborough
15:00 GMT	Mason-Clark 52'; Kent (yellow card) 56'; Taylor (yellow card) 75'; Ogbeta 83'; B.Thompson (yellow card) 90'	Report	White (yellow card) 75'	Stadium: Weston Homes Stadium; Attendance: 12,060; Referee: Carl Brook

1 April 2023 39	Derby County	0–2	Ipswich Town	Derby
15:00 BST	Cashin (yellow card) 3'; McGoldrick (yellow card) 23'; Smith (yellow card) 60'; White (yellow card) 85'	Report	Chaplin 17'; Clarke (yellow card) 41'; Walton (yellow card) 51'; Hirst 76'; Burns (yellow card) 90+1'	Stadium: Pride Park Stadium; Attendance: 29,691 (3,145 Ipswich Town supporters); Referee: Anthony Backhouse

7 April 2023 40	Forest Green Rovers	0–2	Derby County	Nailsworth
15:00 BST	Cooper (yellow card) 7'	Report	Collins 2' (pen.); Knight (yellow card) 69'; McGoldrick 82'	Stadium: The Bolt New Lawn; Attendance: 4,117 (1,225 away); Referee: Will Finnie

10 April 2023 41	Derby County	1–1	Milton Keynes Dons	Derby
15:00 BST	McGoldrick 17'; Rooney (yellow card) 70'; Roberts (yellow card) 84'	Report	Maghoma (yellow card) 24'; Lawrence 68'; Watson (yellow card) 74'	Stadium: Pride Park Stadium; Attendance: 26,793 (962 MK Dons supporters); Referee: Benjamin Speedie

15 April 2023 42	Bristol Rovers	1–1	Derby County	Horfield
15:00 BST	Evans 90+5' (pen.)	Report	McGoldrick 4'; Cashin (yellow card) 50'; Wildsmith (yellow card) 60'; Forsyth (yellow card) 68'; Dobbin (yellow card) 90+1'; White (yellow card) 90+3'; Roberts (yellow card) 90+5'	Stadium: Memorial Stadium; Attendance: 9,388 (1,293 Derby County supporters); Referee: Ollie Yates

18 April 2023 43	Exeter City	1–2	Derby County	Exeter
19:45 BST	Sparkes 78'	Report	McGoldrick 52', 76'; Roberts (yellow card) 66'	Stadium: St James' Park; Attendance: 7,028; Referee: Andy Woolmer

22 April 2023 44	Derby County	1–0	Burton Albion	Derby
15:00 BST	McGoldrick 63' (pen.); Roberts (yellow card) 77'	Report	Oshilaja (yellow card) 49'	Stadium: Pride Park Stadium; Attendance: 29,304 (2,101 Burton Albion supporters); Referee: Ben Toner

29 April 2023 45	Derby County	1–1	Portsmouth	Derby
15:00 BST	Collins 71'	Report	Towler (yellow card) 6'; Bishop 24'; Morrell (yellow card) 55'	Stadium: Pride Park Stadium; Attendance: 31,744 (3,120 Portsmouth supporters); Referee: Lee Swabey

7 May 2023 46	Sheffield Wednesday	1–0	Derby County	Owlerton, Sheffield
12:00 GMT	Smith 43' (pen.); Brown (yellow card) 61'; Palmer (yellow card) 74'; Johnson (yellow card) 90+1'	Report	Davies (red card) 41'; Roberts (yellow card) 43'; Smith (yellow card) 77'	Stadium: Hillsborough; Attendance: 33,413; Referee: Leigh Doughty
Note: Live on Sky Sports

=== FA Cup ===
Derby were drawn away to Torquay United in the first round, and then away to Newport County in the second round, with this tie being confirmed after the Rams defeated Torquay in a replay at home, having drawn the initial match. In the third round, they were back at home against Barnsley, before being drawn at home against West Ham United in the fourth round.

5 November 2022 First round	Torquay United	2–2	Derby County	Torquay
15:00 BST	Hall 56'; Ellis (yellow card) 90+3'; Goodwin 90+5'	Report	Sibley (yellow card) 14'; Osula 27', 47'; Cashin (red card) 55'	Stadium: Plainmoor; Attendance: 4,269; Referee: David Rock

15 November 2022 First round replay	Derby County	5–0	Torquay United	Derby
19:45 GMT	Ellis 7' (o.g.); Osula 15'; Thompson 38'; Dobbin 62'; McGoldrick 79'; Collins (yellow card) 82'	Report	Ness (yellow card) 70'; Lapslie (yellow card) 90+1'	Stadium: Pride Park Stadium; Attendance: 7,204; Referee: Sam Purkiss

27 November 2022 Second round	Newport County	1–2	Derby County	Newport
15:15 GMT	Farquharson 41'; Drysdale (yellow card) 90+4'	Report	Sibley 54'; Smith (yellow card) 61'; McGoldrick 88'	Stadium: Rodney Parade; Attendance: 3,507; Referee: Anthony Backhouse

8 January 2023 Third round	Derby County	3–0	Barnsley	Derby
12:30 GMT	Collins 45+1' (pen.); Bird (yellow card) 49'; Barkhuizen 60'; Sibley (yellow card) 69'; Knight 79'	Report	Connell (yellow card) 27'; Kitching (yellow card) 68'	Stadium: Pride Park Stadium; Attendance: 11,512; Referee: Sunny Gill

30 January 2023 Fourth round	Derby County	0–2	West Ham United	Derby
19:45 GMT	Smith (yellow card) 22'	Report	Bowen 10'; Antonio 50'; Souček (yellow card) 70'	Stadium: Pride Park Stadium; Attendance: 25,308; Referee: Thomas Bramall

=== EFL Cup ===
Derby County were drawn away to Mansfield Town in the first round and at home to West Bromwich Albion or Sheffield United in the second round. They were drawn away to Liverpool in the third round.

9 August 2022 First round	Mansfield Town	1–2	Derby County	Mansfield
19:45 BST	Hewitt (yellow card) 11'; O'Toole (yellow card) 41'; Hawkins 56'; Bowery (red card) 80'	Report	Hewitt 30' (o.g.); Wildsmith (yellow card) 51'; Barkhuizen 69'; Oduroh (yellow card) 90'	Stadium: One Call Stadium; Attendance: 6,861; Referee: Andrew Kitchen

23 August 2022 Second round	Derby County	1–0	West Bromwich Albion	Derby
19:45 BST	Sibley 15'	Report	Fellows (yellow card) 59'	Stadium: Pride Park Stadium; Attendance: 10,638; Referee: Bobby Madley

9 November 2022 Third round	Liverpool	0–0 (3–2 p)	Derby County	Liverpool
20:00 GMT		Report		Stadium: Anfield; Attendance: 52,608; Referee: Tony Harrington
	Penalties
	Bajcetic (penalty missed); Oxlade-Chamberlain (penalty scored); Firmino (penalty missed); Núñez (penalty scored); Elliott (penalty scored)		McGoldrick (penalty scored); Hourihane (penalty missed); Forsyth (penalty missed); Sibley (penalty scored); Dobbin (penalty missed)

=== EFL Trophy ===
On 20 June, the initial Group stage draw was made, grouping Derby County with Mansfield Town and Grimsby Town. Three days later, Manchester City U21s joined Northern Group F.

Pos	Div	Team	Pld	W	PW	PL	L	GF	GA	GD	Pts	Qualification
1	L2	Grimsby Town	3	1	1	0	1	4	4	0	5	Advance to Round 2
2	L2	Mansfield Town	3	1	1	0	1	4	5	−1	5	Advance to Round 2
3	ACA	Manchester City U21	3	1	0	1	1	6	5	+1	4	
4	L1	Derby County	3	1	0	1	1	5	5	0	4	

Source: EFL.com

30 August 2022 Group stage	Derby County	3–1	Grimsby Town	Derby
19:00 BST	Mendez-Laing 6'; Sibley 42'; Bird 45', (yellow card) 58'	Report	Cropper (yellow card) 60'; Kiernan 88'	Stadium: Pride Park Stadium; Attendance: 5,348; Referee: Carl Boyeson

20 September 2022 Group stage	Derby County	Postponed	Manchester City U21s	Derby
19:00 BST				Stadium: Pride Park Stadium
Note: Fixture was postponed due to international call-ups within the Manchester City U21 squad.

4 October 2022 Group stage	Mansfield Town	1–1 (6–5 p)	Derby County	Mansfield
19:00 BST	Maris (yellow card) 11' (goal) 45+3'; Clarke (yellow card) 74'; Hewitt (yellow card) 90+3'	Report	Dobbin 29'; Cashin (yellow card) 34'; Forsyth (yellow card) 72'; Mendez-Laing (yellow card) 83'	Stadium: One Call Stadium; Attendance: 3,630; Referee: Ben Toner
	Penalties
	Akins (penalty missed); Swan (penalty scored); Lapslie (penalty scored); Hewitt (penalty scored); Law (penalty missed); Gale (penalty scored); Clarke (penalty scored); Hawkins (penalty scored)		Mendez-Laing (penalty missed); Knight (penalty scored); Thompson (penalty scored); Forsyth (penalty missed); Cybulski (penalty scored); Roberts (penalty scored); Oduroh (penalty scored); Stearman (penalty missed)

18 October 2022 Group stage	Derby County	1–3	Manchester City U21	Derby
19:00 BST	McGoldrick 38'; Sibley (yellow card) 55'; Thompson (yellow card) 77'	Report	Borges 27' 58'; Forsyth 90+1' (o.g.)	Stadium: Pride Park Stadium; Attendance: 3,688; Referee: Tom Nield

== Transfers ==
=== In ===
Date	Pos.	Player	Transferred from	Fee	Ref.
2 July 2022	FW	Tom Barkhuizen (ENG)	Preston North End (ENG)	Free transfer	
2 July 2022	FW	Nathaniel Mendez-Laing (ENG)	Sheffield Wednesday (ENG)	Free transfer	
2 July 2022	GK	Joe Wildsmith (ENG)	Sheffield Wednesday (ENG)	Free transfer	
6 July 2022	CB	James Chester (WAL)	Stoke City (ENG)	Free transfer	
6 July 2022	CM	Conor Hourihane (IRL)	Aston Villa (ENG)	Free transfer	
6 July 2022	CF	David McGoldrick (IRL)	Sheffield United (ENG)	Free transfer	
12 July 2022	CF	George Nunn (IRL)	Chelsea (ENG)	Free transfer	
13 July 2022	CF	James Collins (IRL)	Cardiff City (WAL)	Free transfer	
13 July 2022	GK	Scott Loach (ENG)	Chesterfield (ENG)	Free transfer	
14 July 2022	RB	Kwaku Oduroh (GHA)	Manchester City (ENG)	Free transfer	
16 July 2022	CM	Korey Smith (ENG)	Swansea City (WAL)	Free transfer	
8 August 2022	CB	Jake Rooney (ENG)	Burnley (ENG)	Free transfer	
13 February 2023	CF	Owen Oseni (IRL)	Waterford (IRL)	Undisclosed	

=== Out ===
Date	Pos.	Player	Transferred to	Fee	Ref.
30 June 2022 (Note: The transfer was announced on 16 June, and would become official on 1 July, once his contract expired)	GK	Ryan Allsop (ENG)	Cardiff City (WAL)	Free transfer	
30 June 2022 (Note: The transfer was announced on 2 May, and would become official on 1 July, once his contract expired)	FW	Marko Borkovic (ENG)	Ohio State Buckeyes (USA)	Free transfer	
30 June 2022 (Note: The transfer was announced on 26 June, and would become official on 1 July, once his contract expired)	FW	Malcolm Ebiowei (ENG)	Crystal Palace (ENG)	Free transfer	
30 June 2022 (Note: The transfer was announced on 22 March, and would become official on 1 July, once his contract expired)	RB	Festy Ebosele (IRL)	Udinese (ITA)	Compensation	
30 June 2022 (Note: The transfer was announced on 22 June, and would become official on 1 July, once his contract expired)	CM	Isaac Hutchinson (ENG)	Walsall (ENG)	Free transfer	
30 June 2022 (Note: The transfer was announced on 25 June, and would become official on 1 July, once his contract expired)	GK	Kelle Roos (NED)	Aberdeen (SCO)	Free Transfer	
1 July 2022	CM	Louie Watson (IRL)	Luton Town (ENG)	Compensation	
3 July 2022	LB	Lee Buchanan (ENG)	Werder Bremen (GER)	Compensation	
4 July 2022	CB	Eli Christie (ENG)	Free agent	End of Contract	
4 July 2022	CM	Alex Matthews (ENG)	Free agent	End of Contract	
4 July 2022	RB	Kornell McDonald (ENG)	Free agent	End of Contract	
4 July 2022	AM	Ravel Morrison (JAM)	D.C. United (USA)	End of Contract	
4 July 2022	CB	Charlie Rutt (ENG)	Free agent	End of contract	
4 July 2022	FW	Tyree Wilson (ENG)	Free agent	End of Contract	
8 July 2022	LW	Tom Lawrence (WAL)	Rangers (SCO)	Free Transfer	
18 July 2022	CF	Colin Kazim-Richards (TUR)	Fatih Karagümrük (TUR)	End of contract	
4 August 2022	RB	Nathan Byrne (ENG)	Charlotte (USA)	Undisclosed	
7 January 2023	CF	Jack Stretton (SCO)	Stockport County (ENG)	Undisclosed	
20 February 2023	LW	Reece Nicholas-Davies (ENG)	Queens Park Rangers (ENG)	Free transfer	

=== Loaned in ===
Date	Pos.	Player	Loaned from	On loan until	Ref.
9 July 2022	CB	Haydon Roberts (ENG)	Brighton & Hove Albion (ENG)	End of season	
3 August 2022	LW	Lewis Dobbin (ENG)	Everton (ENG)	End of season	
14 August 2022	GK	Joseph Anang (GHA)	West Ham United (ENG)	23 January 2023 (Note: On 23 January, Anang was recalled back to West Ham)	
1 September 2022	AM	Joe Haigh (ENG)	Chelsea (ENG)	1 January 2023	
1 September 2022	CB	Leigh Kavanagh (IRL)	Brighton & Hove Albion (ENG)	End of season	
1 September 2022	CF	William Osula (DEN)	Sheffield United (ENG)	4 January 2023 (Note: On 4 January, Osula was recalled back to Sheffield United)	
16 January 2023	RW	Tony Springett (IRL)	Norwich City (ENG)	End of season	
29 January 2023	GK	Luke McGee (ENG)	Forest Green Rovers (ENG)	End of season	
31 January 2023	LW	Kido Taylor-Hart (ENG)	Arsenal (ENG)	End of season	
31 January 2023	CF	Billy Vigar (ENG)	Arsenal (ENG)	End of season	
31 January 2023	DM	Harvey White (ENG)	Tottenham Hotspur (ENG)	End of season	

Arsenal Duo Kido Taylor-Hart and Billy Vigar joined up with the academy. The same as Chelsea Loanee Joe Haigh and Brighton & Hove Albion Loanee Leigh Kavanagh.

=== Loaned out ===
Date	Pos.	Player	Loaned to	On loan until	Ref.
29 July 2022	DM	Krystian Bielik (POL)	Birmingham City (ENG)	End of season	
4 August 2022	CF	Jack Stretton (SCO)	Carlisle United (ENG)	7 January 2023 (Note: On 7 January, Stretton was recalled and joined Stockport permanently)	
7 October 2022	GK	Harrison Foulkes (ENG)	Kettering Town (ENG)	4 November 2022	
7 October 2022	LB	Will Grewal-Pollard (ENG)	Belper Town (ENG)	4 November 2022	
8 October 2022	LB	Demico Burton (ENG)	Stourbridge (ENG)	5 November 2022	
14 October 2022	CF	Bartosz Cybulski (POL)	Matlock Town (ENG)	12 December 2022 (Note: On 12 November, Cybulski's loan at Matlock Town was extended by a further month.)	
17 October 2022	CM	Olamide Ibrahim (IRL)	Hednesford Town (ENG)	14 November 2022	
21 October 2022	CB	Harrison Solomon (ENG)	Ilkeston Town (ENG)	18 November 2022	
10 February 2023	CM	Connor Dixon (ENG)	Ilkeston Town (ENG)	10 March 2023	
27 February 2023	RW	Sonny Blu Lo-Everton (SCO)	Wealdstone (ENG)	End of season	
10 March 2023	GK	Harrison Foulkes (ENG)	Ilkeston Town (ENG)	End of season	
16 March 2023	CF	George Nunn (IRL)	Cheshunt (ENG)	End of season	
16 March 2023	GK	Alfie Roberts (ENG)	Newcastle Town (ENG)	End of season	
16 March 2023	CF	Bartosz Cybulski (POL)	AFC Fylde (ENG)	End of season	
21 March 2023	DM	Liam Thompson (ENG)	Scunthorpe United (ENG)	End of season	

== Statistics ==
As of game played on 7 May 2023

No.	Pos	Nat	Player	Total		League One		FA Cup		EFL Cup		EFL Trophy	
No.	Pos	Nat	Player	Apps	Goals	Apps	Goals	Apps	Goals	Apps	Goals	Apps	Goals
Goalkeepers
1	GK	(England) ENG	Joe Wildsmith	54	0	46+0	0	5+0	0	3+0	0	0+0	0
21	GK	(England) ENG	Scott Loach	3	0	0+0	0	0+0	0	0+0	0	3+0	0
Defenders
3	DF	(Scotland) SCO	Craig Forsyth	52	0	32+9	0	4+1	0	3+0	0	3+0	0
5	DF	(Wales) WAL	James Chester	7	0	7+0	0	0+0	0	0+0	0	0+0	0
6	DF	(Republic of Ireland) IRL	Eiran Cashin	52	1	43+0	1	4+1	0	2+0	0	1+1	0
15	DF	(England) ENG	Haydon Roberts	46	2	28+9	2	3+1	0	2+0	0	3+0	0
19	DF	(England) ENG	Richard Stearman	16	0	6+4	0	1+2	0	1+0	0	2+0	0
30	DF	(England) ENG	Kwaku Oduroh	6	0	0+0	0	0+1	0	2+0	0	2+1	0
33	DF	(England) ENG	Curtis Davies	24	0	15+7	0	1+1	0	0+0	0	0+0	0
34	DF	(England) ENG	Jake Rooney	18	0	7+2	0	3+1	0	2+1	0	2+0	0
35	DF	(England) ENG	Max Bardell	1	0	0+0	0	0+1	0	0+0	0	0+0	0
Midfielders
4	MF	(Republic of Ireland) IRL	Conor Hourihane	51	7	42+2	7	3+1	0	1+2	0	0+0	0
8	MF	(England) ENG	Max Bird	48	2	34+4	1	5+0	0	1+1	0	2+1	1
12	MF	(England) ENG	Korey Smith	48	0	33+7	0	3+1	0	3+0	0	1+0	0
16	MF	(England) ENG	Liam Thompson	24	1	1+12	0	2+3	1	2+1	0	3+0	0
17	MF	(England) ENG	Louie Sibley	52	6	26+16	3	4+0	1	3+0	1	2+1	1
22	MF	(England) ENG	Tony Springett	11	0	2+8	0	0+1	0	0+0	0	0+0	0
23	MF	(England) ENG	Harvey White	15	0	5+10	0	0+0	0	0+0	0	0+0	0
26	MF	(Northern Ireland) NIR	Darren Robinson	2	0	0+0	0	0+0	0	0+0	0	0+2	0
28	MF	(Germany) GER	Osazee Aghatise	1	0	0+0	0	0+0	0	0+0	0	0+1	0
38	MF	(Republic of Ireland) IRL	Jason Knight	47	3	33+5	2	2+1	1	2+1	0	1+2	0
Forwards
7	FW	(England) ENG	Tom Barkhuizen	48	6	26+15	4	2+1	1	0+2	1	1+1	0
9	FW	(Republic of Ireland) IRL	James Collins	52	12	29+13	11	4+1	1	1+2	0	2+0	0
10	FW	(Republic of Ireland) IRL	David McGoldrick	45	25	29+10	22	2+0	2	1+1	0	1+1	1
11	FW	(England) ENG	Nathaniel Mendez-Laing	51	8	39+5	7	2+1	0	1+1	0	1+1	1
18	FW	(England) ENG	Lewis Dobbin	54	5	20+23	3	3+2	1	2+1	0	2+1	1
23	FW	(Denmark) DEN	William Osula	21	5	3+13	2	2+1	3	1+0	0	0+1	0
29	FW	(Poland) POL	Bartosz Cybulski	2	0	0+0	0	0+0	0	0+0	0	1+1	0

=== Goals record ===
As of 7 May 2023

Rank	No.	Nat.	Po.	Name	League One	FA Cup	EFL Cup	EFL Trophy	Total
1	10	(Republic of Ireland)	FW	David McGoldrick	22	2	0	1	25
2	9	(Republic of Ireland)	FW	James Collins	11	1	0	0	12
3	11	(England)	FW	Nathaniel Mendez-Laing	7	0	0	1	8
4	4	(Republic of Ireland)	MF	Conor Hourihane	7	0	0	0	7
5	7	(England)	FW	Tom Barkhuizen	4	1	1	0	6
5	17	(England)	MF	Louie Sibley	3	1	1	1	6
7	18	(England)	FW	Lewis Dobbin	3	1	0	1	5
7	23	(Denmark)	FW	William Osula	2	3	0	0	5
9	38	(Republic of Ireland)	MF	Jason Knight	2	1	0	0	3
10	8	(England)	MF	Max Bird	1	0	0	1	2
10	15	(England)	DF	Haydon Roberts	2	0	0	0	2
12	5	(Republic of Ireland)	DF	Eiran Cashin	1	0	0	0	1
12	16	(England)	MF	Liam Thompson	0	1	0	0	1
Own Goals					2	1	1	0	4
Total					67	12	3	5	87

=== Disciplinary record ===
As of 7 May 2023

Rank	No.	Nat.	Po.	Name	League One			FA Cup			EFL Cup			EFL Trophy			Total		
Rank	No.	Nat.	Po.	Name	Booked	(yellow card) (yellow-red card)	Sent off (straight red)	Booked	(yellow card) (yellow-red card)	Sent off (straight red)	Booked	(yellow card) (yellow-red card)	Sent off (straight red)	Booked	(yellow card) (yellow-red card)	Sent off (straight red)	Booked	(yellow card) (yellow-red card)	Sent off (straight red)
1	6	(Republic of Ireland)	DF	Eiran Cashin	9	0	0	0	0	1	0	0	0	1	0	0	10	0	1
2	17	(England)	MF	Louie Sibley	6	0	0	2	0	0	0	0	0	1	0	0	9	0	0
2	12	(England)	MF	Korey Smith	7	0	0	2	0	0	0	0	0	0	0	0	9	0	0
4	3	(Scotland)	DF	Craig Forsyth	6	0	0	0	0	0	0	0	0	1	0	0	7	0	0
4	9	(Republic of Ireland)	FW	James Collins	4	0	1	1	0	0	0	0	0	0	0	0	5	0	1
6	4	(Republic of Ireland)	MF	Conor Hourihane	6	0	0	0	0	0	0	0	0	0	0	0	6	0	0
6	15	(England)	DF	Haydon Roberts	6	0	0	0	0	0	0	0	0	0	0	0	6	0	0
8	38	(Republic of Ireland)	MF	Jason Knight	5	0	0	0	0	0	0	0	0	0	0	0	5	0	0
8	10	(Republic of Ireland)	FW	David McGoldrick	5	0	0	0	0	0	0	0	0	0	0	0	5	0	0
8	11	(England)	FW	Nathaniel Mendez-Laing	4	0	0	0	0	0	0	0	0	1	0	0	5	0	0
8	33	(England)	DF	Curtis Davies	3	0	1	0	0	0	0	0	0	0	0	0	3	0	1
12	1	(England)	GK	Joe Wildsmith	3	0	0	0	0	0	1	0	0	0	0	0	4	0	0
13	8	(England)	MF	Max Bird	1	0	0	1	0	0	0	0	0	1	0	0	3	0	0
13	18	(England)	FW	Lewis Dobbin	3	0	0	0	0	0	0	0	0	0	0	0	3	0	0
13	23	(Denmark)	FW	William Osula	1	0	1	0	0	0	0	0	0	0	0	0	1	0	1
16	7	(England)	FW	Tom Barkhuizen	2	0	0	0	0	0	0	0	0	0	0	0	2	0	0
16	16	(England)	MF	Liam Thompson	1	0	0	0	0	0	0	0	0	1	0	0	2	0	0
16	34	(England)	DF	Jake Rooney	2	0	0	0	0	0	0	0	0	0	0	0	2	0	0
16	19	(England)	DF	Richard Stearman	2	0	0	0	0	0	0	0	0	0	0	0	2	0	0
20	5	(Wales)	DF	James Chester	1	0	0	0	0	0	0	0	0	0	0	0	1	0	0
20	30	(England)	DF	Kwaku Oduroh	0	0	0	0	0	0	1	0	0	0	0	0	1	0	0
Total					77	0	3	6	0	1	2	0	0	6	0	0	91	0	4
