= Haydon Roberts =

English footballer

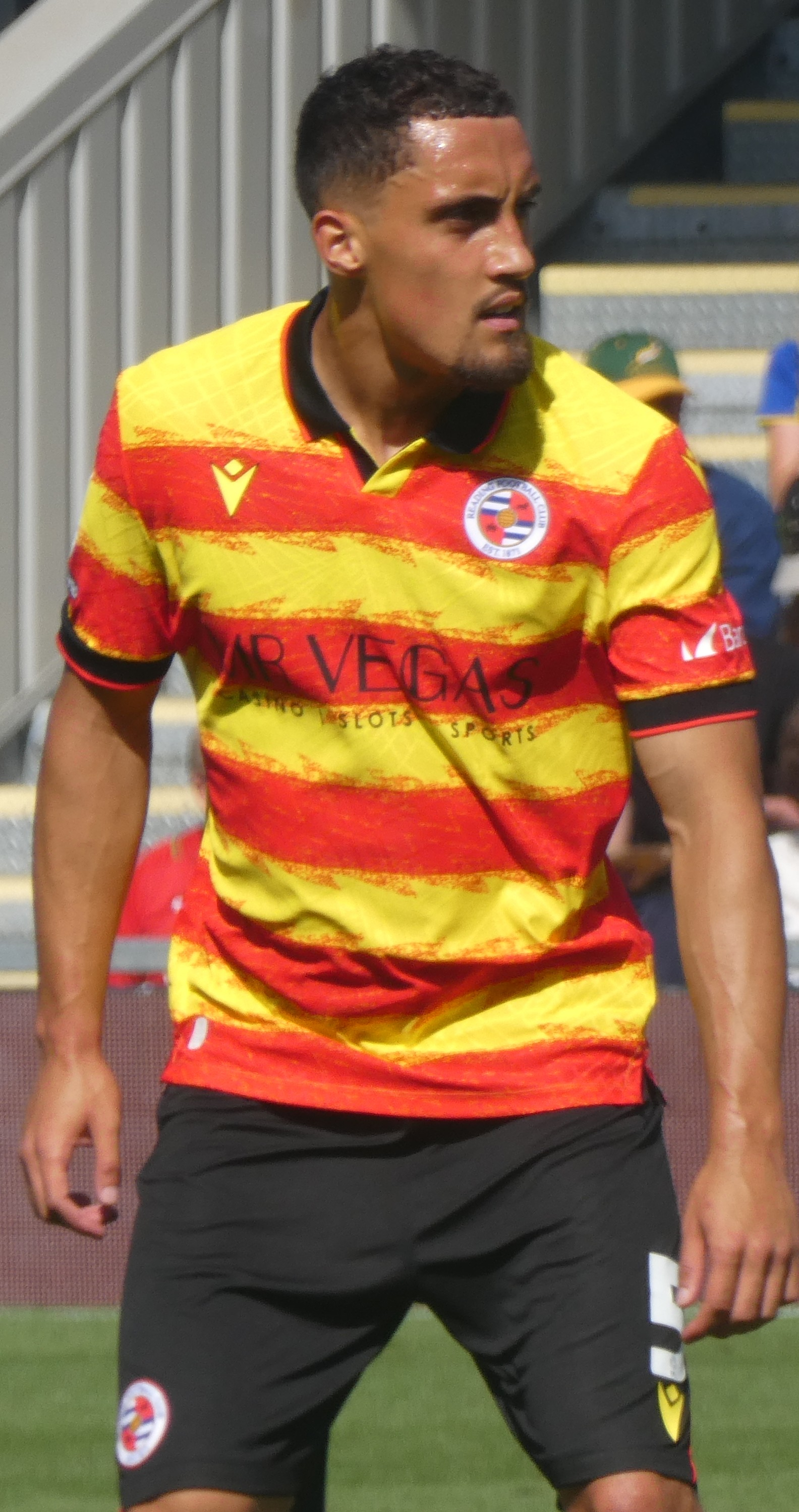
- Roberts in 2026

Personal information
- Full name: Haydon Cameron Roberts
- Date of birth: 10 May 2002 (age 24)
- Place of birth: Brighton, England
- Height: 1.88 m (6 ft 2 in)
- Position: Defender

Team information
- Current team: Reading
- Number: 5

Youth career
- 2015–2020: Brighton & Hove Albion

Senior career*
Years	Team	Apps	(Gls)
2019–2023	Brighton & Hove Albion	0	(0)
2020–2021	→ Rochdale (loan)	26	(0)
2022–2023	→ Derby County (loan)	37	(2)
2023–2026	Bristol City	65	(2)
2026–	Reading	25	(1)

International career^{‡}
2018–2019	England U17	14	(0)
2019	England U18	5	(0)
- * Club domestic league appearances and goals as of 1 November 2026 (UTC) ‡ National team caps and goals as of 07:28, 17 October 2019

Haydon Cameron Roberts (born 10 May 2002) is an English professional footballer who plays as a left back and centre back for EFL League One side Reading.

== Club career ==
=== Brighton & Hove Albion ===
Roberts made his professional and first team debut for Brighton & Hove Albion, whose academy he had progressed from, on 25 September 2019 in the EFL Cup at home against Aston Villa where he scored Brighton's only goal in a 3–1 defeat.

His next appearance came almost a year later, on 17 September 2020. This appearance again came in the EFL Cup, this time coming on as a substitute in the 4–0 home victory over Portsmouth.

==== Rochdale (loan) ====
Roberts signed a season long loan deal with League One side Rochdale on 16 October 2020. He made his debut four days later in which was also his professional league debut, playing the full match and helping keep a clean sheet in the 1–0 away win over Burton Albion. Roberts made 25 appearances in the league and in all competitions as Rochdale finished in 21st place so were relegated from the third tier.

==== Return to the Albion ====
He made his first appearance in the 2021–22 season on 24 August, in the EFL Cup second round fixture away at Cardiff City where he helped keep a clean sheet in the 2–0 victory. He featured in a Premier League matchday squad for the first time on 11 September, remaining as an unused substitute in the 1–0 away win over Brentford.

==== Derby (loan) ====
On 9 July 2022, Roberts joined EFL League One club Derby County on loan for the 2022–23 season. He scored his first goal for Derby and first ever in a league game on 12 November, heading home from a Conor Hourihane corner in the 3–1 away win over MK Dons. For reward for scoring the goal, Roberts bizarrely received a mug from head coach Paul Warne. Under Warne, Roberts played in central defence for Derby and stated Roberts was "his kind of player" and hinted interest at wanting Roberts to stay at Pride Park beyond his loan spell. Roberts scored two goals in 44 appearances as Derby fell short of the League One play-offs.

=== Bristol City ===
On 14 June 2023, it was announced that Roberts had signed a three-year deal with Championship side Bristol City, officially joining on 1 July 2023. He made his debut on 9 August in the EFL Cup second round fixture against League One outfit Oxford United at Ashton Gate. Roberts started the match and set up Harry Cornick's opening goal and went on to assist Jason Knight's second goal of the evening in the 5–1 victory. Three days later, he made his Championship debut, coming on as a 76th-minute substitute away at Millwall as Bristol City went on to score a 90+4th minute winner with a Matty James strike to score the only goal of the game.

=== Reading ===
On 21 January 2026, EFL League One club Reading announced the signing of Roberts from Bristol City on a contract until 30 June 2028 for an undisclosed fee. On 24 January, Roberts scored a debut goal in a 2-2 draw at home to Barnsley.

== International career ==
Roberts was included in the England squad for the 2019 UEFA European Under-17 Championship.

== Career statistics ==
As of match played 17 February 2026

Appearances and goals by club, season and competition
Club	Season	League			FA Cup		League Cup		Other		Total	
Club	Season	Division	Apps	Goals	Apps	Goals	Apps	Goals	Apps	Goals	Apps	Goals
Brighton & Hove Albion U21	2019–20	—			—		—		3 (Note: Appearances in EFL Trophy)	0	3	0
Brighton & Hove Albion U21	2020–21	—			—		—		1	0	1	0
Brighton & Hove Albion U21	2021–22	—			—		—		1	0	1	0
Brighton & Hove Albion U21	Total		—		—		—		5	0	5	0
Brighton & Hove Albion	2019–20	Premier League	0	0	0	0	1	1	—		1	1
Brighton & Hove Albion	2020–21	Premier League	0	0	0	0	2	0	—		2	0
Brighton & Hove Albion	2021–22	Premier League	0	0	0	0	3	0	—		3	0
Brighton & Hove Albion	2022–23	Premier League	0	0	0	0	0	0	—		0	0
Brighton & Hove Albion	Total		0	0	0	0	6	1	0	0	6	1
Rochdale (loan)	2020–21	League One	26	0	0	0	—		0	0	26	0
Derby County (loan)	2022–23	League One	37	2	3	0	2	0	2	0	44	2
Bristol City	2023–24	Championship	23	1	1	0	2	0	—		26	1
Bristol City	2024–25	Championship	30	1	0	0	1	0	2 (Note: Appearances in EFL Championship play-offs)	0	33	1
Bristol City	2025–26	Championship	12	0	0	0	1	0	—		13	0
Bristol City	Total		65	2	1	0	4	0	2	0	62	2
Reading	2025–26	League One	7	1	0	0	0	0	0	0	0	0
Career total			135	5	4	0	12	1	9	0	160	6
