= Curtis Davies =

Footballer (born 1985)

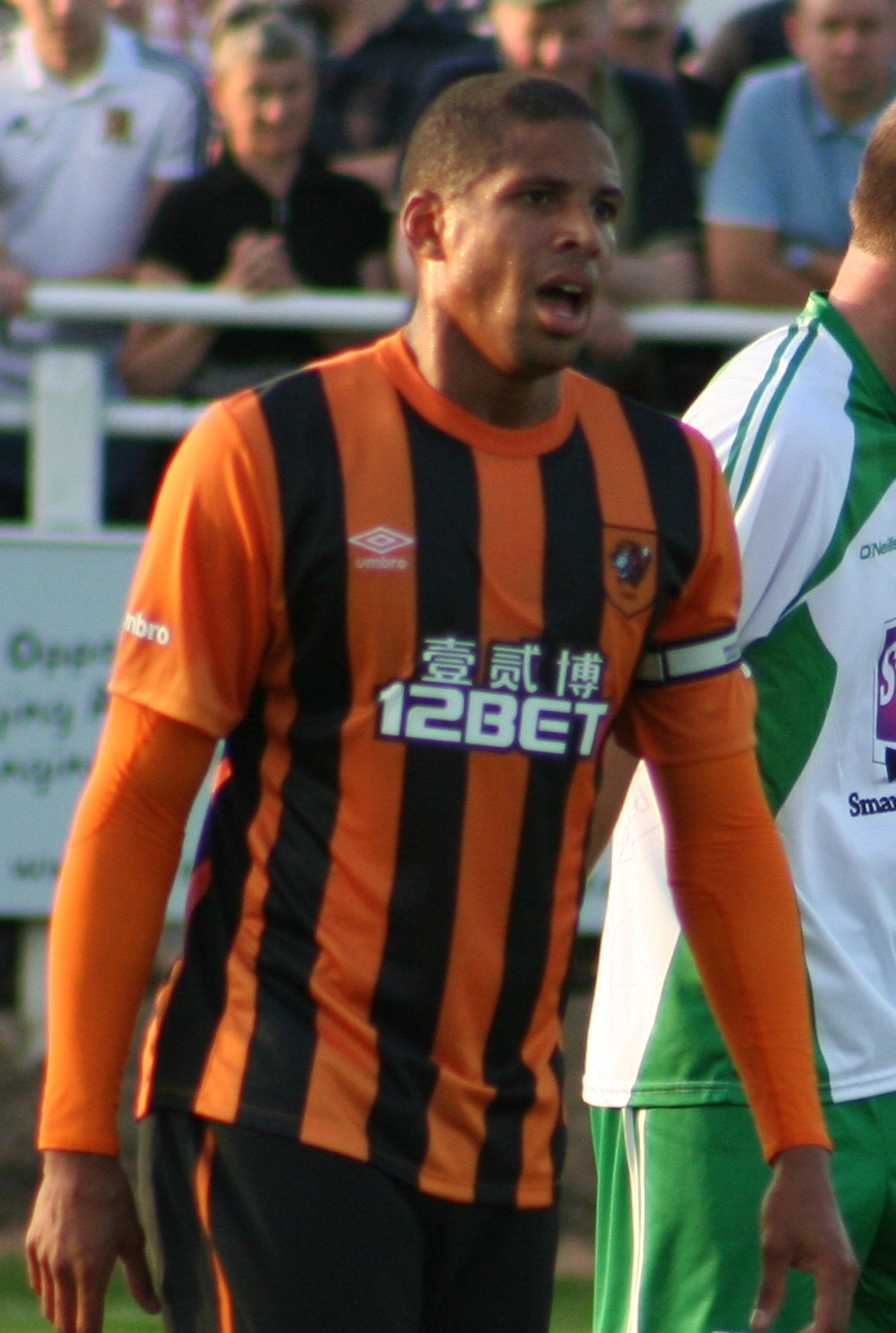
- Davies playing for Hull City in 2014

Personal information
- Full name: Curtis Eugene Davies
- Date of birth: 15 March 1985 (age 41)
- Place of birth: Leytonstone, London, England
- Height: 6 ft 2 in (1.88 m)
- Position: Centre-back

Youth career
- 2000–2001: Wimbledon
- 2001–2003: Luton Town

Senior career*
Years	Team	Apps	(Gls)
2003–2005	Luton Town	56	(2)
2005–2008	West Bromwich Albion	65	(2)
2007–2008	→ Aston Villa (loan)	12	(1)
2008–2011	Aston Villa	37	(2)
2010–2011	→ Leicester City (loan)	12	(0)
2011–2013	Birmingham City	89	(11)
2013–2017	Hull City	123	(4)
2017–2023	Derby County	164	(5)
2023–2024	Cheltenham Town	37	(1)
Total		595	(28)

International career
2006–2007	England U21	3	(0)
2023–2024	Sierra Leone	3	(1)
- * Club domestic league appearances and goals

Curtis Eugene Davies (born 15 March 1985) is a former professional footballer who played as a centre-back. Born in England, he played for the Sierra Leone national team.

Davies began his career at Luton Town, for whom he made his professional debut in 2003. Davies moved to Premier League side West Bromwich Albion in 2005. He signed on loan for Aston Villa in 2007, making the move permanent in 2008. After injury problems forced him out of the side in 2009, Davies joined Leicester City on loan in 2010 and then transferred to Birmingham City in January 2011. He signed for Hull City in 2013 and then moved to Derby County in 2017, before leaving in 2023. He then joined Cheltenham Town in 2023, then announced his retirement from football in 2024 after his release by Cheltenham. Davies made three appearances for the England under-21s and was called up to the senior squad several times but never made a full international appearance, before declaring for Sierra Leone in 2023, where he was capped 3 times, scoring once.

== Club career ==
=== Early career ===
Davies started his football career with Wimbledon as a trainee but was released at the age of 16. He wrote to every club in the local area, including Arsenal, Crystal Palace, Queens Park Rangers, Tottenham Hotspur and Millwall asking for a trial. Colchester United responded first, two weeks before any other club, and a trial was offered; after a couple of trial matches he was released. Luton Town were the next to offer him a trial. During the trial, he scored two goals in three matches and was offered a scholarship.

=== Luton Town ===
Davies made his professional debut for Luton in the second round of the Football League Trophy against Rushden & Diamonds in November 2003, and ended 2003–04 season having made seven first team appearances. The next season Davies achieved his first promotion as he appeared in 44 league matches for the Hatters, scoring his first senior goal in the League One title-clinching win at Wrexham. As well as winning Luton Town's Young Player of the Year award, Davies was named League One Player of the Year, and was selected alongside five Luton teammates in the League One PFA Team of the Year.

The next season Davies only managed six matches, and one goal in his final match, at home to Millwall, before he was signed by Premier League club West Bromwich Albion on 31 August 2005 for a fee of £3 million.

=== West Bromwich Albion ===
Davies made 35 starts and scored two goals in his first season with Albion, which ended with the club being relegated to the Championship. In July 2006, he signed a new four-year contract, and was appointed captain on a permanent basis, having captained the team on several occasions during the previous season to become the club's second youngest captain of all time. He was sent off for the first time in February 2007 after receiving two yellow cards for challenges on Middlesbrough striker Mark Viduka. A month later, he broke a metatarsal in Albion's match against Crystal Palace, an injury that ruled him out for the rest of the season and made him unavailable for selection for the first match at the new Wembley Stadium, an England under-21 international, for which he had been named in the squad. Nevertheless, he was named in the PFA Championship Team of the Year for 2006–07.

On 21 June, Davies had a transfer request rejected by West Brom, and he resigned the captaincy. The club were unwilling to allow him to leave unless their valuation was met, but Davies himself felt the asking price was too high for a player who had "been part of a relegated team". On 30 August, Albion announced that they had given permission for Davies to speak to Aston Villa about a possible move.

=== Aston Villa ===
==== 2007–08 ====
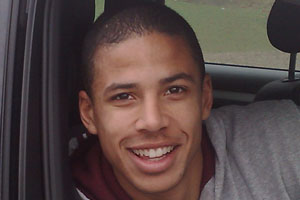
Davies pictured in 2007

On 31 August 2007, Davies signed for Aston Villa on loan for the season, with a view to a permanent transfer in the summer of 2008. He made his Villa debut in a 1–0 League Cup defeat to Leicester City on 27 September, afterwards comparing his performance to that of a pub team player:

I was just awful. I didn't contribute anything. I've been bigging myself up, saying I'm ready and obviously I'm not. I'm not good enough to get in the team yet. I'm honest with myself in every performance and that was rubbish – I looked like a pub team player.

Davies made his Premier League debut with Villa in the 2–0 home victory against Derby County on 3 November, and scored on his first Premier League start, in a 2–1 away victory at Wigan Athletic in December. He then became a regular in Villa's back four at the expense of Zat Knight.

On 1 March 2008, Davies suffered a ruptured achilles tendon against Arsenal and was expected to be out for at least six months.

==== 2008–09 ====
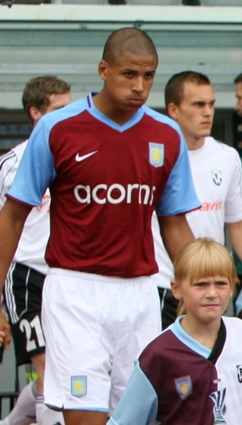
Davies before an Aston Villa match in 2008

Davies signed a four-year contract with Aston Villa to make the move permanent on 3 July 2008. The fee was undisclosed, but was reported at between £8m and £11m. Manager Martin O'Neill had said in April that he "[didn't] expect to see him back until October or November time", but Davies was fit to start Villa's UEFA Cup match against Fimleikafélag Hafnarfjarðar on 14 August. He captained Aston Villa for the first time on 6 November, in the 1–0 UEFA Cup win against Slavia Prague, with regular captain Martin Laursen on the substitutes' bench. He scored his first goal of the season in January 2009, helping his team to a 2–1 win against his former club West Bromwich Albion. Davies chose not to celebrate the goal out of respect for his former club.

==== 2009–10 ====
Davies started the opening match of the season, a 2–0 defeat at home to Wigan Athletic described by The Guardian's reporter as showing "shambolic defending and failure to play with any cohesion", in which Davies "looked vulnerable every time Wigan attacked". In contrast, a week later, Davies scored the second of Villa's three goals away to Liverpool with a header from a corner-kick in first-half stoppage time, in what BBC Sport's reporter called "an outstanding defensive display". Davies' recurring shoulder problems required surgery in September. During his absence, Villa brought in defenders James Collins from West Ham United and Richard Dunne from Manchester City. He returned to action as a second-half substitute in the FA Cup match against Brighton & Hove Albion on 23 January, replacing Stephen Warnock. A suggested loan to Scottish Premier League club Celtic in order to gain match fitness was rejected by O'Neill, who felt the club could not afford to lose Davies's services for the whole season. He made no further first-team appearances.

==== 2010–11 ====
Davies was transfer-listed in the summer of 2010. In August, Martin O'Neill resigned from his position at the club. Following this, Davies told journalists that he felt O'Neill had not given him a fair chance and that he hoped a new manager would give every member of the squad a clean slate. Davies appeared just twice before joining Championship club Leicester City on 15 October on a month's loan. His debut, against Hull City the next day, was the first league match he had played in twelve months. The loan was extended until January 2011, and Davies played regularly until returning to Aston Villa when his loan expired.

=== Birmingham City ===
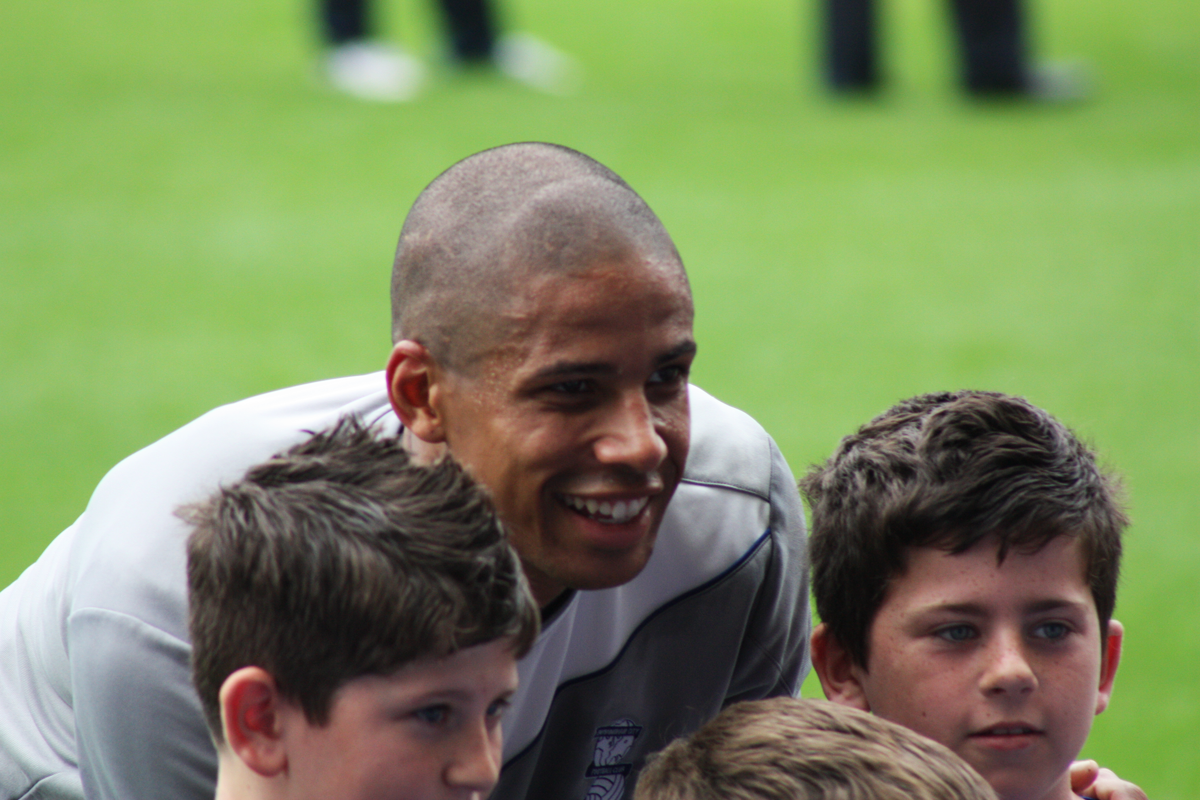
Davies with Birmingham City in 2011

On 28 January 2011, Davies signed for rivals Birmingham City on a three-and-a-half-year contract for an undisclosed fee. He was given the squad number 32. Davies was cup-tied for Birmingham's victory in the 2011 League Cup Final. He made his first-team debut in a 3–1 home defeat to former club West Bromwich Albion in March, coming into the starting eleven in place of the injured Martin Jiránek. His first goal for the club came when he opened the scoring with a header from a Jordon Mutch corner on 6 August 2011 as Birmingham went on to lose 2–1 at Derby County. In Birmingham's first match in major European competition for nearly 50 years, the Europa League play-off round first leg against Portuguese club Nacional, which finished goalless, Davies made a well-timed tackle from behind to prevent Mateus opening the scoring.

=== Hull City ===
On 25 June 2013, Davies moved to newly promoted Premier League club Hull City on a three-year contract for an undisclosed fee, reported by BBC Sport as "understood to be around £2.25 million". He made his debut on the first day of the 2013–14 season in a 2–0 loss away at Chelsea, and scored his first goal for the club on 14 September against Cardiff City, when he headed home Tom Huddlestone's precise cross from six yards. At the annual awards ceremony on 7 May 2014, at the KC Stadium, Davies was voted as the Player of the Year. On 17 May 2014 he started in the FA Cup Final against Arsenal and scored to put his team 2–0 up, however Hull went on to lose 3–2. On 16 March 2016, Davies signed a two-year extension to his contract with the club.

=== Derby County ===
On 7 June 2017, Davies signed a two-year contract with Championship club Derby County for an undisclosed fee following Hull's relegation from the Premier League. After being an ever-present figure in his first season, Davies struggled with injury in 2018–19, first with a hamstring problem that allowed Richard Keogh and Fikayo Tomori to establish themselves as starting centre-backs and then with a ruptured Achilles tendon that kept him out for the second half of the season. In September 2019, Keogh sustained a serious knee injury in a car crash after which two team-mates were charged with drink driving, so Davies regained both his starting place and the captaincy for the next match, against his former club Birmingham City.

At the end of the 2020–21 season, Davies was offered a new contract with the club however no contract was agreed and Davies left the club on 1 July 2021. In August 2021 however, Davies rejoined the club after the EFL allowed Derby to sign out-of-contract players providing strict wage limits were adhered to. Davies received praise across the course of the season and was one of the favourites among Derby fans for the player of the season award despite Derby's relegation. Davies played in every minute of Derby's 2021–22 Championship season. With the prospective takeover by Chris Kirchner, a new contract for Davies was among the priorities for the fans. This was confirmed on 8 July 2022, as Davies signed a 1-year deal to extend his stay until 2023

Davies was named club captain by interim manager Liam Rosenior ahead of the 2022–23 League One campaign, but he struggled for game time during the season under Rosenior and new manager Paul Warne in the first half of the season due to injuries. After his return, Davies lost his place in the starting eleven as Warne favoured Eiran Cashin, Craig Forsyth and Jake Rooney in the centre back role, however after a loss of form by Derby in spring of 2023, Davies won his place back in the team with four games of the season remaining. Derby went unbeaten in the next three games and went into the final game of the season at Sheffield Wednesday on 7 May 2023 with a win or a draw being enough to secure Derby a place in the League One promotion play-offs. In the 41st minute of the game at Hillsborough, Davies was adjudged by referee Leigh Doughty to have fouled Wednesday player Marvin Johnson in the penalty box and Doughty gave a penalty to Wednesday, with Davies also getting red carded. The penalty resulted in the only goal of the game and with Peterborough United winning elsewhere it meant Derby failed to qualify for the play-offs. Former referee Keith Hackett called this decision a major error by the referee and Davies was left devastated by the sending off and being out of contract didn't know where is future lied at Derby. On 10 May 2023, Derby announced the Davies would be released at the end of the season after making a total of 175 appearances for the club in six years.

=== Cheltenham Town ===
On 27 June 2023, it was announced that Davies had signed for League One side Cheltenham Town on a one-year deal.

On 30 April 2024 the club announced Davies would be leaving at the end of the season.

On 2 August 2024, he announced his retirement as a player.

== International career ==
Davies made his England under-21 debut on 28 February 2006, against Norway U21s. He was capped three times by the England under-21s from 2006 to 2007. He was named in Fabio Capello's first provisional England squad in January 2008. Davies initially expressed shock at the news of his call-up. He was also named in England's squad to face Germany in November of that year, but did not take the field.

Davies was also eligible for the Republic of Ireland through his grandparents and it was reported that the FAI had contacted him about the possibility. He then revealed that his grandmother was born in Ireland while her English father was serving there in the army, so he has no Irish heritage. He went on to say that he would prefer to play for the country of his father, Sierra Leone, if he fails to get into the England squad.

In October 2023 at age 38, Davies was called up to the Sierra Leone national team squad for their friendly matches against Benin and Somalia. On 5 June 2024, Davies scored his first international goal, in a 2–1 2026 FIFA World Cup qualification win against Djibouti.

== Personal life ==
Davies was born in Leytonstone, London, to an English mother and a Sierra Leonean father.

He is married and has three daughters (the eldest from a previous marriage). He is the patron of Saving Lives, a charity which seeks to increase public awareness about HIV and encourage them to get tested. Along with Gavin Rae and Chris Burke, Davies co-founded and was a director of the clothing company Seven One Zero, which was voluntarily dissolved in 2018.

In June 2020 Davies gained a first class honours degree in professional sports writing and broadcasting from Staffordshire University.

== Punditry ==
From the 2018–19 season, Davies has been part of the punditry line-up on Quest's coverage of the English Football League.

== Career statistics ==
As of end of 2023–24 season

Appearances and goals by club, season and competition
Club	Season	League			FA Cup		League Cup		Europe		Other		Total	
Club	Season	Division	Apps	Goals	Apps	Goals	Apps	Goals	Apps	Goals	Apps	Goals	Apps	Goals
Luton Town	2003–04	Second Division	6	0	0	0	0	0	—		1 (Note: Appearance in Football League Trophy)	0	7	0
Luton Town	2004–05	League One	44	1	3	0	1	0	—		0	0	48	1
Luton Town	2005–06	Championship	6	1	—		1	0	—		—		7	1
Luton Town	Total		56	2	3	0	2	0	—		1	0	62	2
West Bromwich Albion	2005–06	Premier League	33	2	2	0	—		—		—		35	2
West Bromwich Albion	2006–07	Championship	32	0	4	0	2	0	—		—		38	0
West Bromwich Albion	2007–08	Championship	0	0	—		0	0	—		—		0	0
West Bromwich Albion	Total		65	2	6	0	2	0	—		—		73	2
Aston Villa (loan)	2007–08	Premier League	12	1	1	0	1	0	—		—		14	1
Aston Villa	2008–09	Premier League	35	1	4	0	0	0	6 (Note: Appearances in UEFA Cup)	0	—		45	1
Aston Villa	2009–10	Premier League	2	1	1	0	0	0	2 (Note: Appearance(s) in UEFA Europa League)	0	—		5	1
Aston Villa	2010–11	Premier League	0	0	0	0	1	0	1	0	—		2	0
Aston Villa	Total		49	3	6	0	2	0	9	0	—		66	3
Leicester City (loan)	2010–11	Championship	12	0	—		—		—		—		12	0
Birmingham City	2010–11	Premier League	6	0	1	0	—		—		—		7	0
Birmingham City	2011–12	Championship	42	5	5	0	1	0	4	0	2 (Note: Appearances in Championship play-offs)	1	54	6
Birmingham City	2012–13	Championship	41	6	2	0	2	0	—		—		45	6
Birmingham City	Total		89	11	8	0	3	0	4	0	2	1	106	12
Hull City	2013–14	Premier League	37	2	5	3	1	0	—		—		43	5
Hull City	2014–15	Premier League	21	0	1	0	0	0	3	0	—		25	0
Hull City	2015–16	Championship	39	2	3	0	2	0	—		3	0	47	2
Hull City	2016–17	Premier League	26	0	1	0	2	0	—		—		29	0
Hull City	Total		123	4	10	3	5	0	3	0	3	0	144	7
Derby County	2017–18	Championship	46	1	0	0	0	0	—		2	0	48	1
Derby County	2018–19	Championship	5	0	0	0	0	0	—		—		5	0
Derby County	2019–20	Championship	32	0	3	0	2	0	—		—		37	0
Derby County	2020–21	Championship	13	0	0	0	1	0	—		—		14	0
Derby County	2021–22	Championship	46	4	1	0	0	0	—		—		47	4
Derby County	2022–23	League One	22	0	2	0	0	0	—		0	0	24	0
Derby County	Total		164	5	6	0	3	0	0	0	2	0	175	5
Cheltenham Town	2023–24	League One	37	1	1	0	1	0	—		0	0	39	1
Career total			595	28	40	3	18	0	16	0	8	1	677	32

=== International ===
As of match played 10 June 2024

Appearances and goals by national team and year
National team	Year	Apps	Goals
Sierra Leone	2023	1	0
Sierra Leone	2024	2	1
Total		3	1

As of match played 5 June 2024
Sierra Leone score listed first, score column indicates score after each Davies goal.

List of international goals scored by Curtis Davies
No.	Date	Venue	Cap	Opponent	Score	Result	Competition	Ref.
1	5 June 2024	Ben M'Hamed El Abdi Stadium, El Jadida, Morocco	2	Djibouti	1–0	2–1	2026 FIFA World Cup qualification	

== Honours ==
Luton Town

- Football League One: 2004–05

Hull City

- Football League Championship play-offs: 2016
- FA Cup runner-up: 2013–14

Individual

- Luton Town Young Player of the Year: 2004–05
- Birmingham City Player of the Year: 2012–13
- Hull City Player of the Year: 2013–14
- Derby County Player of the Year: 2021–22
- Football League One Player of the Year: 2004–05
- PFA Team of the Year: 2004–05 League One, 2006–07 Championship, 2011–12 Championship
- Sir Tom Finney Award: 2025
