= Joe Wildsmith =

English footballer (born 1995)

Personal information
- Full name: Joseph Charles Wildsmith
- Date of birth: 28 December 1995 (age 30)
- Place of birth: Sheffield, England
- Height: 6 ft 0 in (1.83 m)
- Position: Goalkeeper

Team information
- Current team: Wycombe Wanderers
- Number: 33

Youth career
- –2014: Sheffield Wednesday

Senior career*
Years	Team	Apps	(Gls)
2014–2022	Sheffield Wednesday	66	(0)
2014	→ Alfreton Town (loan)	2	(0)
2015	→ Barnsley (loan)	2	(0)
2022–2024	Derby County	86	(0)
2024–2026	West Bromwich Albion	17	(0)
2026	→ Middlesbrough (loan)	0	(0)
2026–	Wycombe Wanderers	1	(0)

International career
2015	England U20	1	(0)
- * Club domestic league appearances and goals as of 11 October 2026 (UTC)

Joseph Charles Wildsmith (born 28 December 1995) is an English professional footballer who plays as a goalkeeper for EFL League One club Wycombe Wanderers.

Wildsmith started his career at Sheffield Wednesday. He had loan spells at Alfreton Town and Barnsley before making his debut for Wednesday in 2015, He left the club in June 2022 to join Derby County, where he spent two seasons, helping the club regain promotion to the EFL Championship.

== Club career ==
=== Sheffield Wednesday ===
Born in Sheffield, Wildsmith began his football career at boyhood club Sheffield Wednesday. Wildsmith signed a 2 1/2-year professional contract with Sheffield Wednesday in November 2013 after impressing with the club's youth teams. During the 2014–15 season, Wildsmith was named as an unused substitute for four matches.

Wildsmith made his Owls debut in Wednesday's 4–1 League Cup win over Mansfield Town at Hillsborough on 11 August 2015. On 28 August 2015, he signed a new two-year contract with the club keeping him until the summer of 2017. Two weeks later on 15 September 2015, Wildsmith kept his first clean sheet, in a 0–0 draw against Bolton Wanderers. He then made further League cup starts against Premier League giants Newcastle United and Arsenal, claiming clean sheets and wins over both teams. Wildsmith broke into the first-team under new manager Carlos Carvalhal, as Keiren Westwood was injured and Chris Kirkland had left for Preston North End. As a result, he made his return to the starting line–up as a first choice goalkeeper, keeping a clean sheet, in a 3–0 win against Birmingham City. This was followed up by starting in the next three matches, including earning his fourth clean sheet of the season against Fulham on 2 January 2016. However, Wildsmith suffered a back injury that kept him out for two months. After recovering from injury, he returned to the substitute bench and didn't make an appearance until on 9 April 2016, starting the whole game, in a 4–1 loss against Bristol City. At the end of the 2015–16 season, Wildsmith went on to make fourteen appearances in all competitions.

Ahead of the 2016–17 season Wildsmith was featured in the two out of the five pre–season matches for the side. He made his first appearance of the season, starting and played 120 minutes, in a 2–1 loss against Cambridge United in the first round of the League Cup. However, Wildsmith found himself as the club's second choice goalkeeper and placed on the substitute bench throughout the season, even he faced his own injury concern. Despite, Wildsmith appeared two times against Middlesbrough and Fulham. At the end of the 2016–17 season, he made three appearances for the side in all competitions. Following this, the club opted to take up their option of a contract extension that would ensure Wildsmith remained under contract for the 2017–18 season.

At the start of the 2017–18 season, Wildsmith appeared in three matches (playing once in the league and twice in the League Cup). He then signed a five-year contract with Sheffield Wednesday, keeping him until 2022. Wildsmith then made his return to the starting line–up against Birmingham City on 27 September 2017, as they lost 1–0. Following this, he started in the next two matches, including earning a clean sheet against Leeds United on 1 October 2017. After spending two months returning to the substitute bench, Wildsmith didn't return to the starting line–up until on 15 December 2017 against Wolverhampton Wanderers, losing 1–0. Since returning to the first team, he regained his first choice goalkeeper role for the rest of the season. Wildsmith then kept four consecutive clean sheets for the club between 6 January 2018 and 30 January 2018. Wildsmith continued to remain as the club's first choice goalkeeper until he was dropped in favour of Cameron Dawson for the remaining matches of the 2017–18 season. At the end of the 2017–18 season, Wildsmith made twenty–nine appearances in all competitions.

Ahead of the 2018–19 season, Wildsmith said he was ready to fight for his place for the first choice goalkeeper role. However, Manager Jos Luhukay stated while he preferred Cameron Dawson as the first choice keeper in the league, though he would put Wildsmith as a keeper in cup competitions. Luhukay eventually did put Wildsmith in goal for the League matches, starting against Sunderland and Wolverhampton Wanderers. However, he spent the rest of the 2018–19 season, placed on the substitute bench, with Dawson and Westwood preferred to be used in goal under both Luhukay and Steve Bruce and made two appearances in all competitions.

Ahead of the 2019–20 season, Wildsmith was linked with a move away from Sheffield Wednesday, but he remained at the club. However, Wildsmith suffered a knock and was substituted during a 2–1 loss against VfB Lübeck in a friendly match on 19 July 2019. As a result, he was sidelined for almost the rest of 2019. By December, Wildsmith returned from injury and then assigned to the substitute bench for the next four months for the side. It wasn't until on 4 March 2020 when he made his first appearance of the season, in a 1–0 loss against Manchester City in the fifth round of the FA Cup. Once the season resumed behind closed doors because of the COVID-19 pandemic, Wildsmith returned to the first team on 20 June 2020 against Nottingham Forest, in a 1–1 draw. For the remaining matches of the 2019–20 season, he became the club's first choice goalkeeper. Wildsmith then kept two consecutive clean sheets between 11 July 2020 and 14 July 2020. At the end of the 2019–20 season, he went on to make ten appearances in all competitions.

Following the end of the 2021–22 season, the club confirmed they had offered Wildsmith a new contract. On 22 June 2022, it was confirmed that he had rejected the offer and would leave the club.

=== Loan spells ===
On 29 March 2014, Wildsmith was loaned out to Alfreton Town for the rest of the 2013–14 season. It wasn't until on 21 April 2014 when he made his debut for the club, starting the whole game, as they lost 3–2 against Hereford United. His second appearance for Alfreton Town came on 26 April 2014 against Macclesfield Town, coming on as a 64th-minute substitute for Jon Worsnop and conceded the only goal of the game, as they lost 1–0. Wildsmith made two appearances for the club.

In March 2015, Wildsmith signed for Barnsley on an emergency one-month loan deal, making his professional debut on 28 March against Bristol City. He went on to make two appearances for the club.

=== Derby County ===
On 2 July 2022, Wildsmith joined Derby County on a free transfer. Wildsmith made 54 appearances in his first season for Derby, being an ever present in Derby's League One, EFL Cup and FA Cup matches, as they narrowly missed out on a play-off place by 1 point. Wildsmith had a strong season for Derby with penalty saves against Accrington Stanley and Ipswich Town in back-to back weeks and a clean sheet at Anfield against Liverpool in the EFL Cup being highlights.

Ahead of the 2023–24 season, Derby signed Josh Vickers to compete with Wildsmith for the role of first-choice goalkeeper. Despite this, Wildsmith retained his role his first-choice league goalkeeper. A run of 4,638 consecutive minutes of league appearances for Derby was ended after Wildsmith was sent-off with referee Charles Breakspear red-carding Wildsmith for handling outside the penalty area in a match against Bolton Wanderers on 2 September 2023. Wildsmith claimed to have chested the ball and with video evidence supporting that claim, Derby appealed the red card decision in hope to get the one-match ban overturned on 4 September 2023, a day later the appeal was upheld and Wildsmith's red card and ban was withdrawn by the FA. After starting all of his first 70 league games since joining Derby, Wildmsith was dropped from the team, with Josh Vickers taking the start at Fleetwood Town on 6 January 2024, after picking up a knock and a drop in form in recent games. Derby head coach Paul Warne stated that Wildsmith was "respectful" of the decision despite his disappointment of being dropped. After six matches on the sidelines, Wildsmith returned to the starting 11 on 10 February 2024, after Vickers was ruled out with an injury. Wildmsith in March 2024 to the Derby Telegraph stated that joining Derby was the best decision he has made in his career, as he had two seasons of being a first choice keeper for the first time in his career, making more appearances for Derby then he did for Sheffield Wednesday in seven seasons. Wildsmith had twenty clean sheets in his forty League One appearances, which was the most in the division that season which won him the Golden Glove award, he also made three further appearances in cup competitions. These performances helped Derby finish runners-up in the division and earn promotion to the Championship automatically.

On 18 May 2024, it was announced that Wildsmith would leave Derby at the end of his contract on 30 June 2024, after 97 appearances over two seasons.

=== West Bromwich Albion ===
On 10 July 2024, Wildsmith joined West Bromwich Albion on a two-year deal. On 13 August 2024, he made his debut for the club in a 2–1 away defeat against Fleetwood Town in the EFL cup first round. Wildsmith made his league debut for West Bromwich Albion on 8 February 2025 in a 2–1 win at home against his boyhood club Sheffield Wednesday, following the departure of previous first-choice goalkeeper Alex Palmer during the winter 2024–25 transfer window.

On 2 February 2026, Wildsmith joined Middlesbrough on loan until end of the season.

On 15 May 2026, West Bromwich Albion announced he would be released at the end of the season when his contract expired.

=== Wycombe Wanderers ===
On 24 September 2026, Wildsmith joined League One club Wycombe Wanderers.

== International career ==
Throughout 2014 and 2015, Wildsmith was called up to the England U20 squad. He made his England U20 debut on 7 October 2015, starting the whole game, in a 3–1 win against Netherlands U20.

Wildsmith was called up into the England under-21 national squad on three occasions, but never made an appearance for the U21 side.

== Career statistics ==
As of end of 2025–26 season

Appearances and goals by club, season and competition
Club	Season	League			FA Cup		League Cup		Other		Total	
Club	Season	Division	Apps	Goals	Apps	Goals	Apps	Goals	Apps	Goals	Apps	Goals
Sheffield Wednesday	2013–14	Championship	0	0	0	0	0	0	—		0	0
Sheffield Wednesday	2014–15	Championship	0	0	0	0	0	0	—		0	0
Sheffield Wednesday	2015–16	Championship	9	0	1	0	4	0	0	0	14	0
Sheffield Wednesday	2016–17	Championship	1	0	1	0	1	0	0	0	3	0
Sheffield Wednesday	2017–18	Championship	26	0	1	0	2	0	—		29	0
Sheffield Wednesday	2018–19	Championship	0	0	0	0	2	0	—		2	0
Sheffield Wednesday	2019–20	Championship	9	0	1	0	0	0	—		10	0
Sheffield Wednesday	2020–21	Championship	19	0	2	0	2	0	—		23	0
Sheffield Wednesday	2021–22	League One	3	0	1	0	0	0	4 (Note: Appearance(s) in EFL Trophy)	0	8	0
Sheffield Wednesday	Total		66	0	7	0	11	0	4	0	88	0
Alfreton Town (loan)	2013–14	Conference Premier	2	0	—		—		—		2	0
Barnsley (loan)	2014–15	League One	2	0	—		—		—		2	0
Derby County	2022–23	League One	46	0	5	0	3	0	0	0	54	0
Derby County	2023–24	League One	40	0	2	0	0	0	1	0	43	0
Derby County	Total		86	0	7	0	3	0	1	0	97	0
West Bromwich Albion	2024–25	Championship	10	0	1	0	1	0	—		12	0
West Bromwich Albion	2025–26	Championship	7	0	0	0	1	0	—		8	0
West Bromwich Albion	Total		17	0	1	0	2	0	0	0	20	0
Middlesbrough (loan)	2025–26	Championship	0	0	—		—		0	0	0	0
Wycombe Wanderers	2026–27	League One	0	0	0	0	—		0	0	0	0
Career total			172	0	15	0	16	0	5	0	208	0

== Honours ==
Derby County

- League One second-place promotion: 2023–24
