= Sonny Blu Lo-Everton =

Footballer

Personal information
- Full name: Sonny Blu Lo-Everton
- Date of birth: 15 September 2002 (age 24)
- Place of birth: London, England
- Height: 5 ft 9 in (1.75 m)
- Position: Midfielder

Team information
- Current team: Torquay United
- Number: 24

Youth career
- 2011–2020: Watford

Senior career*
Years	Team	Apps	(Gls)
2020–2022	Watford	0	(0)
2021	→ Wealdstone (loan)	10	(2)
2021–2022	→ Yeovil Town (loan)	33	(1)
2022–2023	Derby County	0	(0)
2023	→ Wealdstone (loan)	12	(1)
2023–2025	Yeovil Town	65	(7)
2025–	Torquay United	37	(6)

International career^{‡}
2019	Scotland U17	5	(0)
2019	Scotland U18	2	(0)
2019–2020	Scotland U19	3	(0)
- * Club domestic league appearances and goals as of 09:12, 17 April 2026 (UTC) ‡ National team caps and goals as of 22:43, 4 December 2021 (UTC)

Sonny Blu Lo-Everton (born 15 September 2002) is a professional footballer who plays as a midfielder for National League South club Torquay United.

== Club career ==
Lo-Everton began his career at Watford, joining the club's academy in 2011. He was featured in The Guardian's Next Generation 2019 list, named as one of the most talented prospects in Premier League academies.

He joined National League club Wealdstone on a short-term loan, helping the club to retain its place in the fifth tier. After making several appearances in Watford's pre-season friendlies, Lo-Everton was loaned out again to Yeovil Town at the beginning of the 2021–22 season, reuniting with former Watford youth coach Darren Sarll, and featured in the Glovers' 1–0 victory over League Two Stevenage in the second round of the FA Cup.

In September 2022, he signed a one-year contract at Derby County. On 27 February 2023, Lo-Everton rejoined National League side Wealdstone on loan until the end of the 2022–23 season. Lo-Everton was released by Derby at the end of the 2022–23 season.

On 24 July 2023, Lo-Everton signed for National League South club Yeovil Town following a successful trial. Following a successful 2023–24 season that saw Yeovil promoted back to the National League as champions, Lo-Everton had a one-year contract extension clause triggered.

On 10 July 2025, Lo-Everton joined National League South side Torquay United.

== International career ==
Lo-Everton is eligible to represent England, Scotland, Hong Kong and China at international level. Lo-Everton chose to represent Scotland at international level, qualifying through his grandmother. He was selected at Under-17, Under-18 and Under-19 level.

== Career statistics ==
As of match played 6 April 2026

Appearances and goals by club, season and competition
Club	Season	League			FA Cup		EFL Cup		Other		Total	
Club	Season	Division	Apps	Goals	Apps	Goals	Apps	Goals	Apps	Goals	Apps	Goals
Watford	2020–21	Championship	0	0	0	0	0	0	—		0	0
Watford	2021–22	Premier League	0	0	0	0	0	0	—		0	0
Watford	Total		0	0	0	0	0	0	—		0	0
Wealdstone (loan)	2020–21	National League	10	2	—		—		—		10	2
Yeovil Town (loan)	2021–22	National League	33	1	4	1	—		7 (Note: Two appearances in FA Trophy, five appearances and three goals in Somerset Premier Cup)	3	44	5
Derby County	2022–23	League One	0	0	0	0	0	0	0	0	0	0
Wealdstone (loan)	2022–23	National League	12	1	—		—		—		12	1
Yeovil Town	2023–24	National League South	36	3	3	0	—		1 (Note: Appearance(s) in FA Trophy)	0	40	3
Yeovil Town	2024–25	National League	29	4	1	0	—		0	0	30	4
Yeovil Town	Total		65	7	4	0	—		1	0	70	7
Torquay United	2025–26	National League South	37	6	0	0	—		2 (Note: One appearance in FA Trophy, one appearance in Devon St Lukes Challenge Cup)	0	39	6
Career total			157	17	8	1	0	0	10	3	175	21

== Honours ==
Yeovil Town

- National League South: 2023–24
