= Bartosz Cybulski =

Polish footballer

Personal information
- Full name: Bartosz Marcin Cybulski
- Date of birth: 15 October 2002 (age 24)
- Place of birth: Poland
- Position: Forward

Team information
- Current team: Spalding United F.C.

Youth career
- Nottingham Forest
- –2021: Derby County

Senior career*
Years	Team	Apps	(Gls)
2021–2023	Derby County	4	(0)
2022	→ Matlock Town (loan)	5	(1)
2022–2023	→ Solihull Moors (loan)	11	(3)
2023	→ AFC Fylde (loan)	7	(0)
2023–2024	King's Lynn Town	42	(8)
2024–	Spalding United	29	(34)
- * Club domestic league appearances and goals as of 13:18, 26 September 2024 (UTC)

Bartosz Marcin Cybulski (born 15 October 2002) is a Polish professional footballer who plays as a forward for Spalding United.

Cybulski started his career at Derby County, making his professional debut in 2022, with loan spells at Matlock Town, Solihull Moors and AFC Fylde during the 2022–23 season, before his release by Derby in May 2023. In August 2023, Cybulski joined King's Lynn Town.

== Club career ==
Cybulski made his debut for Derby County as a substitute in a 2–0 FA Cup loss to Chorley on 9 January 2021. He was one of fourteen players from Derby County's academy to make their debut in the game, after the entirety of Derby's first team squad and coaching team were forced to isolate due to a COVID-19 outbreak. He made his league debut as a substitute in a 1–0 win against Peterborough United on 19 February 2022.

On 14 October 2022, he joined Northern Premier League Premier Division side Matlock Town on loan.

On 2 December 2022, he joined National League side Solihull Moors on a one-month loan. He joined National League North leaders AFC Fylde on 17 March 2023, on loan until the end of the season, at Fylde he played a part in their National League North title success.

At the end of the 2022–23 season, Cybulski's contract was not renewed by Derby County and he became a free agent.

On 22 August 2023, after what Cybulski described as a "rough couple of months" as a free agent, he signed with King's Lynn Town of the National League North on a two-year contract.

In September 2024, Cybulski joined Southern League Premier Division Central club Spalding United for an undisclosed fee.

== International career ==
Cybulski was born in Poland and moved to the British Isles at the age of 4. He has been called up by Poland at U19 level.

== Career statistics ==
As of match played 20 April 2024

Appearances and goals by club, season and competition
Club	Season	League			FA Cup		EFL Cup		Other		Total	
Club	Season	Division	Apps	Goals	Apps	Goals	Apps	Goals	Apps	Goals	Apps	Goals
Derby County	2020–21	Championship	0	0	1	0	0	0	—		1	0
Derby County	2021–22	Championship	4	0	0	0	0	0	—		4	0
Derby County	2022–23	League One	0	0	0	0	0	0	2 (Note: Appearances in the Football League Trophy)	0	2	0
Derby County	Total		4	0	1	0	0	0	2	0	7	0
Matlock Town (loan)	2022–23	Northern Premier League	5	1	0	0	0	0	1 (Note: Appearances in the FA Trophy)	0	6	1
Solihull Moors (loan)	2022–23	National League	11	3	0	0	0	0	0	0	9	3
AFC Fylde (loan)	2022–23	National League North	7	0	0	0	0	0	0	0	7	0
King's Lynn Town	2023–24	National League North	39	8	0	0	0	0	0	0	39	8
Career total			66	12	1	0	0	0	3	0	70	12

== Honours ==
AFC Fylde

- National League North: 2022–23
