= Louie Sibley =

English footballer

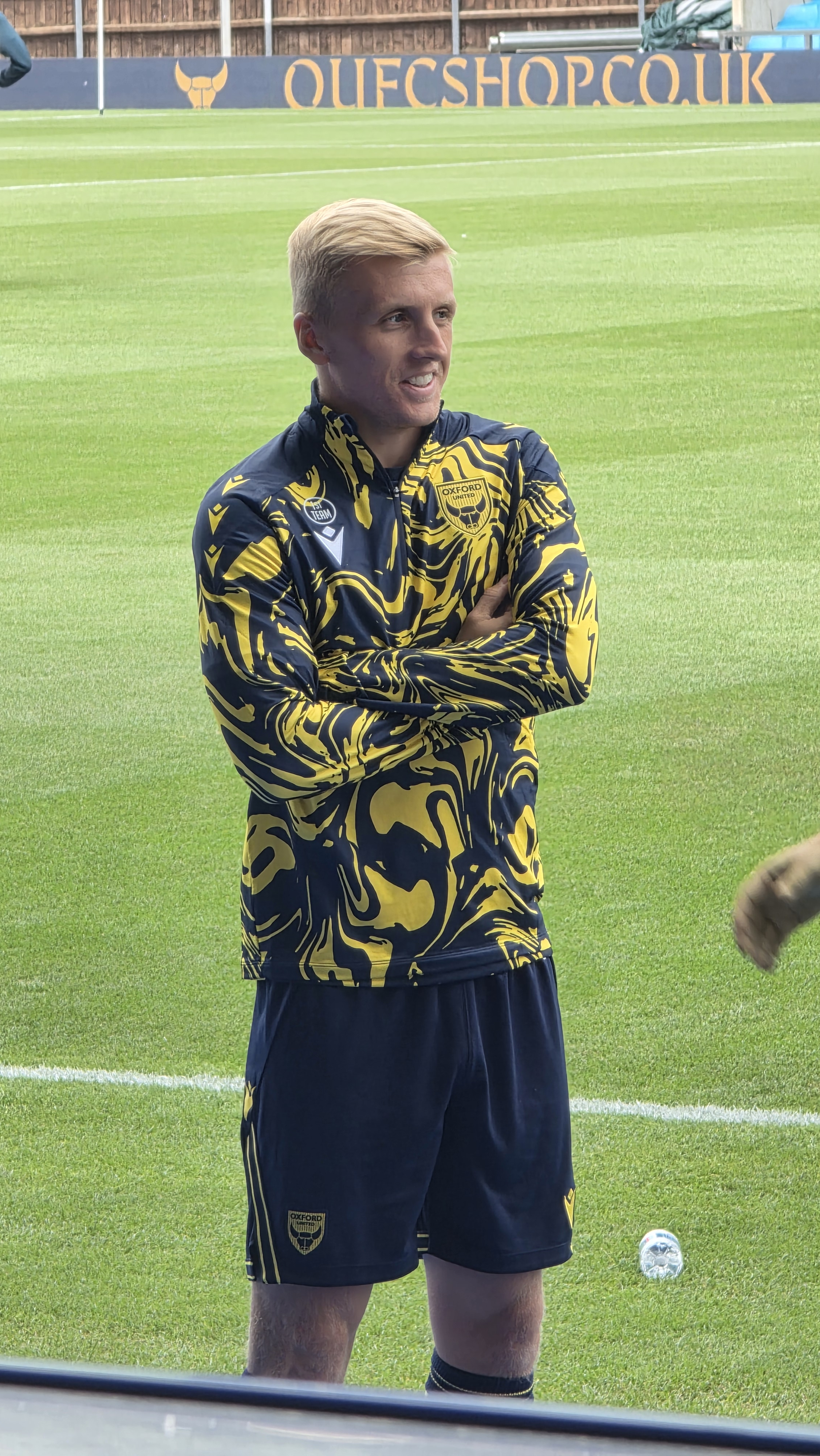
- Louie Sibley in 2025

Personal information
- Full name: Louie Joseph Sibley
- Date of birth: 13 September 2001 (age 25)
- Place of birth: Burton Upon Trent, England
- Height: 1.80 m (5 ft 11 in)
- Position: Midfielder

Team information
- Current team: Oxford United
- Number: 32

Youth career
- 2010–2019: Derby County

Senior career*
Years	Team	Apps	(Gls)
2019–2024	Derby County	147	(13)
2024–	Oxford United	17	(2)
2025	→ Rotherham United (loan)	21	(2)
2026	→ Bradford City (loan)	4	(0)

International career^{‡}
2017–2018	England U17	5	(0)
2019	England U18	2	(0)
2019	England U19	1	(0)
2021	England U20	1	(0)
- * Club domestic league appearances and goals as of 15 September 2026 (UTC) ‡ National team caps and goals as of 17:57, 6 September 2021 (UTC)

Louie Joseph Sibley (born 13 September 2001) is an English professional footballer who plays as a midfielder for EFL League One club Oxford United.

Sibley joined Derby County's academy in 2010, making his first-team debut in December 2019, after he was a part of the club's U18 Premier League championship in 2018–19. Sibley played in over 170 first-team matches for Derby and, during the 2023–24 season, helped the club win back promotion the Championship after a two-year absence in League One. Sibley left Derby for Oxford in the summer of 2024.

== Early life ==
Sibley was born and raised in Burton upon Trent and attended Paulet High School.

== Club career ==
=== Derby County ===
Sibley was with Derby County since he joined the Under-8s academy team. After being named the 2017–18 Academy Player of the Year he signed as a first-year scholar at the beginning of the 2018–19 season, a season which ended in a U18 Premier League title success.

On 12 August 2019 Sibley made his professional debut in the EFL Cup against Scunthorpe United. On 28 August of the same year, Sibley received his first senior start, again in the EFL Cup, against Nottingham Forest, which ended in a 3–0 loss. Sibley made his league debut as a substitute in Derby's 3–0 loss to Reading on 21 December 2019. On 20 June 2020, Sibley scored his first senior hat-trick for Derby on only his second league start, away to Millwall. He ended the 2019–20 season with 5 goals in 11 league matches.

On 17 September 2020, Sibley signed a new deal with Derby to take him through to the end of the 2023–24 season. During the 2020–21 season Sibley was a first-team regular, making 32 appearances with his only goal of the season coming in a 2–2 draw against Brentford as Derby avoided relegation by one point.

The 2021–22 season would be an even tougher one for Derby as they were handed multiple points deductions which totalled 21. Injuries limited Sibley's game time and in January 2022, with the club needing to raise funds in administration, Millwall made several bids for Sibley. Sibley stayed at Derby, however, and scored the winning goal in stoppage time in a 1–0 success over Peterborough United on 19 February 2022. This would be Sibley's only Championship goal, as Derby were unable to overcome the deduction and were relegated to League One in April 2022.

During the 2022–23 season, Sibley made a total of 52 appearances, scoring six times, three times in League One, with highlights being the only goal in an EFL Cup win over West Bromwich Albion in August 2022 and two goals in a 3–2 league win over Oxford United in March 2023. This was his most productive season in front of goal, though Derby missed out on the League One play-offs by one point at the end of the season.

Sibley was unable to take part in any of the pre-season fixtures ahead of the 2023–24 season or the opening five league matches because of a calf injury. Sibley's first three goals of the season came in the EFL Trophy, once against Lincoln City on 19 September 2023 and twice in a 2–1 win at Notts County on 10 October 2023. After this game, Derby head coach Paul Warne described Sibley as the best "finisher" at the club. Sibley scored a 90th-minute winner against Stevenage on 17 February 2024. He was credited with two of Derby's three goals against Port Vale on 2 March 2024; however, the EFL later awarded the opening goal of the game as a Kacper Łopata own goal. At the end of the season, Sibley found himself a regular starter at left-wing back. He made 44 appearances for Derby during the season, scoring six goals as Derby secured promotion to the Championship after finishing League One runners-up.

On 18 May 2024, Derby County confirmed that Sibley was in talks to extend his contract, with his deal expiring in June 2024. On 2 July 2024, it was confirmed that Sibley had left Derby after rejecting his contract offer. In total, Sibley made 173 appearances for Derby, scoring 20 goals.

=== Oxford United ===
On 3 July 2024, Sibley joined fellow newly promoted Championship side Oxford United.

On 24 January 2025, Sibley returned to League One, joining Rotherham United on loan for the remainder of the season. He scored inside two minutes on his debut, in a 4–2 defeat at Burton Albion.

On 2 January 2026, Sibley joined League One club Bradford City on loan for the remainder of the season.

== International career ==
Sibley has represented England at U17, U18 and U19 level.

On 6 September 2021, Sibley made his debut for the England U20s during a 6–1 victory over Romania U20s at St. George's Park.

== Career statistics ==
As of 2 January 2026

Appearances and goals by club, season and competition
Club	Season	League			FA Cup		EFL Cup		Other		Total	
Club	Season	Division	Apps	Goals	Apps	Goals	Apps	Goals	Apps	Goals	Apps	Goals
Derby County	2019–20	Championship	11	5	4	0	2	0	0	0	17	5
Derby County	2020–21	Championship	30	1	0	0	2	0	0	0	32	1
Derby County	2021–22	Championship	26	1	0	0	2	1	0	0	28	2
Derby County	2022–23	League One	42	3	4	1	3	1	3 (Note: Appearance(s) in EFL Trophy)	1	52	6
Derby County	2023–24	League One	38	3	2	0	0	0	4	3	44	6
Derby County	Total		147	13	10	1	9	2	7	4	173	20
Oxford United	2024–25	Championship	11	1	1	0	2	0	—		14	1
Oxford United	2025–26	Championship	3	0	0	0	2	0	—		5	0
Oxford United	Total		14	1	1	0	4	0	0	0	19	1
Rotherham United (loan)	2024–25	League One	21	2	0	0	0	0	1	0	22	2
Bradford City (loan)	2025–26	League One	4	0	0	0	0	0	0	0	0	0
Career total			182	16	11	1	31	2	8	4	214	23

== Honours ==
Derby County

- League One second-place promotion: 2023–24
