= 2021–22 Derby County F.C. season =

Derby County
2021–22 season
- Owner: Mel Morris
- Chairman: Mel Morris
- Manager: Wayne Rooney
- Stadium: Pride Park Stadium
- Championship: 23rd (relegated)
- FA Cup: Third round
- EFL Cup: Second round
- Top goalscorer: League: Tom Lawrence (11); All: Tom Lawrence (11)
Home colours	Away colours	Third colours

The 2021–22 season is Derby County's 138th season in existence, their 14th consecutive season in the Championship, and their 54th season overall in the second division of English football. Alongside the Championship, they also competed in the FA Cup and the EFL Cup. Derby were relegated after finishing in 23rd place in the league following a points deduction. The season covers the period from July 2021 to 30 June 2022.

== Administration ==
On 22 September 2021, the EFL released a statement stating Derby were given a 12-point deduction in accordance with regulations after entering administration. On 16 November, Derby were deducted a further nine points after admitting to breaching EFL accounting rules.

== Pre-season friendlies ==
The Rams revealed they would have friendlies against Manchester United, Salford City, Real Betis and Notts County as part of their pre-season preparations.

18 July 2021 Friendly	Derby County	1–2	Manchester United	Derby
13:00 BST	Kazim-Richards 68'	Report	Chong 18'; Pellistri 59'	Stadium: Pride Park Stadium

24 July 2021 Friendly	Salford City	2–1	Derby County	Salford
15:00 BST	Morris 20' (pen.); Elliott 52'	Report	Turnbull 76' (o.g.)	Stadium: Peninsula Stadium

28 July 2021 Friendly	Derby County	1–0	Real Betis	Derby
19:00 BST	Bird 87'	Report		Stadium: Pride Park Stadium

1 August 2021 Friendly	Notts County	0–2	Derby County	Nottingham
13:00 BST		Report	Cashin 41'; Lawrence 86' (pen.)	Stadium: Meadow Lane

== Competitions ==
=== Championship ===
==== League table ====
Pos	Team	Pld	W	D	L	GF	GA	GD	Pts	Promotion, qualification or relegation
19	Hull City	46	14	9	23	41	54	−13	51	
20	Birmingham City	46	11	14	21	50	75	−25	47	
21	Reading	46	13	8	25	54	87	−33	41 (Note: Reading were deducted 6 points for breach of profit and sustainability regulations.)	
22	Peterborough United (R)	46	9	10	27	43	87	−44	37	Relegation to EFL League One
23	Derby County (R)	46	14	13	19	45	53	−8	34 (Note: Derby County were deducted 12 points for entering administration, and a further 9 points for financial irregularities.)	Relegation to EFL League One
24	Barnsley (R)	46	6	12	28	33	73	−40	30	Relegation to EFL League One

Source: EFL Official Website
Rules for classification: 1) Points; 2) Goal difference; 3) Number of goals scored; 4) Head-to-head results; 5) Wins; 6) Away goals; 7) Penalty points (sec 9.5); 8) 12-point sending off offences
(R) Relegated

==== Results summary ====
Overall								Home						Away					
Pld	W	D	L	GF	GA	GD	Pts	W	D	L	GF	GA	GD	W	D	L	GF	GA	GD
46	14	13	19	45	53	−8	34	11	7	5	30	22	+8	3	6	14	15	31	−16

Last updated: 7 May 2022.

==== Results by matchday ====
Matchday	1	2	3	4	5	6	7	8	9	10	11	12	13	14	15	16	17	18	19	20	21	22	23	24	25	26	27	28	29	30	31	32	33	34	35	36	37	38	39	40	41	42	43	44	45	46
Ground	H	A	A	H	H	A	A	H	A (Note: Between matchday 8 and 9, Derby County were deducted 12 points. Combined with this defeat, they dropped to 24th.)	H	H	A	H	A	H	A	A	H (Note: Between matchday 17 and 18, Derby County were deducted a further 9 points.)	A	H	A	H	H	A	A	H	A	H	A	H	A	H	H	A	A	H	A	A	H	H	A	H	A	H	A	H
Result	D	L	W	D	D	L	D	W	L	W	D	D	D	D	L	L	D	W	D	L	L	W	W	W	D	W	L	D	L	W	L	W	L	L	L	W	L	L	D	W	L	W	L	L	W	L
Position	16	18	12	14	15	16	16	12	24	24	24	24	24	24	24	24	24	24	24	24	24	24	24	24	24	23	23	23	23	23	23	22	22	23	23	22	23	23	24	23	23	22	23	23	22	23

Updated to match(es) played on 7 May 2022. Source: Statto.com
A = Away; H = Home; W = Win; D = Draw; L = Loss

==== Matches ====
Derby County's fixtures were revealed on 24 June 2021.

7 August 2021 1	Derby County	1–1	Huddersfield Town	Derby
15:00 BST	Byrne (yellow card) 25'; Davies 39'; Watson (yellow card) 50'; Sibley (yellow card) 80'	Report	Turton (yellow card) 14'; Sarr 45'; Holmes (yellow card) 88'	Stadium: Pride Park Stadium; Attendance: 16,249; Referee: Geoff Eltringham

14 August 2021 2	Peterborough United	2–1	Derby County	Peterborough
12:30 BST	Beevers (yellow card) 25'; Thompson (yellow card) 63'; Butler (yellow card) 83'; Burrows 90+1'; Dembélé 90+10'	Report	Stretton 77'; Sibley (yellow card) 90+1'; Forsyth (yellow card) 90+4'	Stadium: West Homes Stadium; Attendance: 10,477; Referee: David Webb
Note: Live on Sky Sports

18 August 2021 3	Hull City	0–1	Derby County	Kingston upon Hull
19:45 BST	Jones (yellow card) 71'	Report	Baldock 57'; Morrison (yellow card) 79'; Roos (yellow card) 90+2'; Stretton (yellow card) 90+3'	Stadium: MKM Stadium; Attendance: 10,451; Referee: Jeremy Simpson

21 August 2021 4	Derby County	0–0	Middlesbrough	Derby
15:00 BST	Jagielka (yellow card) 65'; Byrne (yellow card) 90+2'	Report	Peltier (yellow card) 30'; Tavernier (yellow card) 43'; Bola (yellow card) 54'; Jones (yellow card) 85'	Stadium: Pride Park Stadium; Attendance: 16,123; Referee: Andy Davies

28 August 2021 5	Derby County	1–1	Nottingham Forest	Derby
12:30 GMT	Lawrence 12'; Jóźwiak (yellow card) 39'; Morrison (yellow card) 68'; Byrne (yellow card) 80'; Sibley (yellow card) 83'	Report	Garner (yellow card) 35'; Johnson 82'	Stadium: Pride Park Stadium; Attendance: 22,991; Referee: Tim Robinson
Note: Live on Sky Sports

10 September 2021 6	Birmingham City	2–0	Derby County	Bordesley
20:00 GMT	Hogan 31'; Šunjić (yellow card) 57'; Bela 81'	Report	Shinnie (yellow card) 24'; Morrison (yellow card) 76'; Lawrence (yellow card) 86'	Stadium: St Andrew's Stadium; Attendance: 14,912; Referee: Gavin Ward
Note: Live on Sky Sports

14 September 2021 7	West Bromwich Albion	0–0	Derby County	West Bromwich
20:00 BST	Livermore (yellow card) 45+2'	Report	Buchanan (yellow card) 33'	Stadium: The Hawthorns; Referee: Kevin Friend

18 September 2021 8	Derby County	2–1	Stoke City	Derby
15:00 BST	Shinnie (yellow card) 8'; Bird 31'; Davies 34'; Sibley (yellow card) 38'	Report	Sawyers (yellow card) 33'; Ince 58', (yellow card) 89'; Østigård (yellow card) 77'	Stadium: Pride Park; Attendance: 20,545; Referee: Jeremy Simpson

25 September 2021 9	Sheffield United	1–0	Derby County	Sheffield
15:00 BST	Gibbs-White (yellow card) 24'; Sharp 89' (pen.)	Report	Shinnie (yellow card) 24'; Roos (red card) 57'	Stadium: Bramall Lane; Attendance: 27,905; Referee: David Webb

29 September 2021 10	Derby County	1–0	Reading	Derby
19:45 BST	Stearman (yellow card) 16'; Forsyth 33'; Byrne (yellow card) 59'; Shinnie (yellow card) 74'; Lawrence (yellow card) 90+2'	Report		Stadium: Pride Park Stadium; Attendance: 18,769; Referee: John Busby

2 October 2021 11	Derby County	0–0	Swansea City	Derby
15:00 BST	Forsyth (yellow card) 45'; Williams (yellow card) 81'; Byrne (yellow card) 89'	Report		Stadium: Pride Park; Attendance: 21,640; Referee: Andrew Madley

16 October 2021 12	Preston North End	0–0	Derby County	Preston
15:00 BST	Johnson (yellow card) 5'; Storey (yellow card) 62'	Report		Stadium: Deepdale; Attendance: 18,092; Referee: Josh Smith

19 October 2021 13	Derby County	2–2	Luton Town	Derby
19:45 BST	Lawrence 20', (yellow card) 90+2'; Knight 60'	Report	Naismith (yellow card) 14'; Onyedinma 48'; Adebayo 83'; Ruddock Mpanzu (yellow card) 90+2'	Stadium: Pride Park; Attendance: 20,258; Referee: Geoff Eltringham

23 October 2021 14	Coventry City	1–1	Derby County	Coventry
15:00 BST	Godden 20' (pen.); Maatsen (yellow card) 44'	Report	Davies (yellow card) 71'; Shinnie 78'; Morrison (yellow card) 88'	Stadium: Coventry Building Society Arena; Attendance: 23,829; Referee: Dean Whitestone

30 October 2021 15	Derby County	1–2	Blackburn Rovers	Derby
15:00 BST	Shinnie (yellow card) 29'; Lawrence (yellow card) 50'; Davies 89'	Report	Brereton 8', 20'; Lenihan (yellow card) 59'; Buckley (yellow card) 86'; Khadra (yellow card) 88'; Poveda (yellow card) 89'; Travis (yellow card) 90+2'	Stadium: Pride Park; Attendance: 22,098; Referee: Steve Martin

2 November 2021 16	Barnsley	2–1	Derby County	Barnsley
19:45 GMT	Adeboyejo 39'; Leya Iseka 50'; Brittain (yellow card) 64'; Andersen (yellow card) 81'	Report	Morrison (yellow card) 15'; Baldock 24'; Buchanan (yellow card) 50'	Stadium: Oakwell; Attendance: 13,786; Referee: Robert Jones

6 November 2021 17	Millwall	1–1	Derby County	Bermondsey
15:00 GMT	Malone 45+1'; Mitchell (yellow card) 57'; Cooper (yellow card) 90+1'	Report	Byrne (yellow card) 27' (yellow-red card) 63'; Ebosele 44'	Stadium: The Den; Attendance: 14,372; Referee: Tim Robinson

21 November 2021 18	Derby County	3–2	Bournemouth	Derby
12:00 GMT	Knight 13'; Lawrence 62', 69' (pen.)	Report	Anthony 19'; Solanke 38'; Billing (yellow card) 53'	Stadium: Pride Park; Attendance: 2,467; Referee: Gavin Ward

24 November 2021 19	Fulham	0–0	Derby County	Fulham, London
19:45 GMT	Carvalho (yellow card) 60'	Report	Ebosele (yellow card) 60'; Shinnie (yellow card) 79'	Stadium: Craven Cottage; Referee: Keith Stroud

29 November 2021 20	Derby County	1–2	Queens Park Rangers	Derby
19:45 GMT	Lawrence 10'	Report	Willock 50'; Gray 90', (yellow card) 90+1'	Stadium: Pride Park; Attendance: 20,003; Referee: Jeremy Simpson

4 December 2021 21	Bristol City	1–0	Derby County	Ashton Gate
15:00 GMT	Scott 16'; Bakinson (yellow card) 39'; Kalas (yellow card) 45+1'; Pring (yellow card) 80'	Report	Knight (yellow card) 39'; Forsyth (yellow card) 40'	Stadium: Ashton Gate; Attendance: 18,732; Referee: Graham Scott

11 December 2021 22	Derby County	1–0	Blackpool	Derby
15:00 GMT	Plange 51'; Jóźwiak (yellow card) 54'; Lawrence (yellow card) 76'	Report	Carey (yellow card) 42'; Anderson (yellow card) 54'	Stadium: Pride Park; Attendance: 21,663; Referee: Andy Woolmer

27 December 2021 23	Derby County	1–0	West Bromwich Albion	Derby
15:00 GMT	Davies (yellow card) 18'; Thompson (yellow card) 20'; Stearman (yellow card) 50'; Kazim-Richards 58'; Cashin (yellow card) 90+5'	Report	Clarke (yellow card) 36'	Stadium: Pride Park; Attendance: 24,846; Referee: James Linington

30 December 2021 24	Stoke City	1–2	Derby County	Stoke-on-Trent
19:45 GMT	Wilmot (yellow card) 16'; Vrančić (yellow card) 61'; Tymon (yellow card) 71'; Ince 78'	Report	Plange 16', (yellow card) 59'; Kazim-Richards 85'	Stadium: Bet365 Stadium; Referee: Matt Donohue

3 January 2022 25	Reading	2–2	Derby County	Reading
15:00 GMT	Hoilett 37', 56'; Laurent (yellow card) 45'	Report	Davies (yellow card) 82', (goal) 90+1'; Kazim-Richards 86'; Byrne (yellow card) 90+6'	Stadium: Select Car Leasing Stadium; Referee: John Busby

15 January 2022 26	Derby County	2–0	Sheffield United	Derby
15:00 GMT	Lawrence 69', 78', (yellow card) 78'	Report	Ndiaye (yellow card) 90+3'	Stadium: Pride Park; Attendance: 24,597; Referee: Graham Scott

22 January 2022 27	Nottingham Forest	2–1	Derby County	West Bridgford
12:30 GMT	Grabban (yellow card) 35', (goal) 48'; Johnson 82'; Samba (yellow card) 89'	Report	Thompson (yellow card) 31'; Stearman (yellow card) 51'; Buchanan (yellow card) 56'; Lawrence 88' (pen.), (yellow card) 89'; Morrison (red card) 90+7'	Stadium: City Ground; Attendance: 29,256; Referee: Tim Robinson

30 January 2022 28	Derby County	2–2	Birmingham City	Derby
13:30 GMT	Plange 87'; Bielik 90+6'	Report	Taylor 7'; Hogan 56'; Woods (yellow card) 62'; Etheridge (yellow card) 63'; Gardner (yellow card) 70'; James (yellow card) 89'	Stadium: Pride Park; Attendance: 32,211; Referee: John Brooks

2 February 2022 29	Huddersfield Town	2–0	Derby County	Huddersfield
19:45 GMT	Holmes 76'; Rhodes 79'; O'Brien (yellow card) 90+3'	Report	Stearman (red card) 3'; Ebosele (yellow card) 62'; Davies (yellow card) 72'; Byrne (yellow card) 90+4'	Stadium: John Smith's Stadium; Attendance: 16,231; Referee: Matt Donohue

8 February 2022 30	Derby County	3–1	Hull City	Derby
19:45 GMT	Forsyth 19'; Lawrence 37'; Ebosele 47'; Bielik (yellow card) 53'; Bird (yellow card) 90+4'	Report	Docherty (yellow card) 17'; Greaves (yellow card) 21'; Forsyth 65' (o.g.); Honeyman (yellow card) 89'	Stadium: Pride Park; Attendance: 22,595; Referee: Geoff Eltringham

12 February 2022 31	Middlesbrough	4–1	Derby County	Middlesbrough
15:00 GMT	Buchanan 15' (o.g.); Tavernier (yellow card) 27'; Crooks (yellow card) 31', (goal) 45+2'; Connolly 44'; Howson (yellow card) 50'; Watmore 89'	Report	Lawrence (yellow card) 27'; Bird 39'; Ebiowei (yellow card) 87'	Stadium: Riverside Stadium; Attendance: 26,266; Referee: Mike Dean

19 February 2022 32	Derby County	1–0	Peterborough United	Derby
15:00 GMT	Lawrence (red card) 47'; Byrne (yellow card) 76'; Davies (yellow card) 80'; Sibley 90+2', (yellow card) 90+3'; Allsop (yellow card) 90+4'; Morrison (yellow card) 90+7'	Report	Coulson (yellow card) 31' (yellow-red card) 35'; Brown (yellow card) 59'; Jones (yellow card) 70'; Thompson (yellow card) 76'; Knight (yellow card) 87'	Stadium: Pride Park; Attendance: 30,251; Referee: James Linington

23 February 2022 33	Derby County	1–2	Millwall	Derby
19:45 GMT	Cooper 88' (o.g.); Allsop (yellow card) 90'	Report	Wallace 2'; Saville (yellow card) 29'; Burey 30'	Stadium: Pride Park; Attendance: 23,943; Referee: Jeremy Simpson

26 February 2022 34	Luton Town	1–0	Derby County	Luton
15:00 GMT	Burke (yellow card) 52'; Hylton 67'; Jerome (yellow card) 72'	Report	Kazim-Richards (yellow card) 77'; Ebiowei (yellow card) 90+3'	Stadium: Kenilworth Stadium; Attendance: 10,070; Referee: Andy Woolmer

1 March 2022 35	Cardiff City	1–0	Derby County	Leckwith
19:45 GMT	Davies (yellow card) 26'; Ikpeazu 85'; Doughty (yellow card) 90+2'	Report	Buchanan (yellow card) 52'; Davies (yellow card) 62'; Bird (yellow card) 80'; Ebosele (yellow card) 90+3'	Stadium: Cardiff City Stadium; Attendance: 18,767; Referee: Andy Davies

5 March 2022 36	Derby County	2–0	Barnsley	Derby
15:00 GMT	Morrison 22', 47'	Report	Wolfe (yellow card) 7'; Morris (yellow card) 90+4'	Stadium: Pride Park Stadium; Attendance: 25,891; Referee: Robert Jones

12 March 2022 37	Bournemouth	2–0	Derby County	Kings Park
15:00 GMT	Stacey (yellow card) 45+1'; Solanke 45+5'; Cantwell (yellow card) 63'; Christie (yellow card) 89'; Lowe 90'	Report	Morrison (yellow card) 69'; Davies (yellow card) 71'	Stadium: Vitality Stadium; Referee: Andy Madley

15 March 2022 38	Blackburn Rovers	3–1	Derby County	Blackburn
19:45 GMT	Wharton 53'; Dolan 59'; Travis (yellow card) 83'; Gallagher 90+7'	Report	Morrison 28', (yellow card) 67'	Stadium: Ewood Park; Attendance: 12,406; Referee: Tony Harrington

19 March 2022 39	Derby County	1–1	Coventry City	Derby
12:30 GMT	Byrne (yellow card) 57'; Lawrence 66' (pen.)	Report	Bidwell (yellow card) 22'; Godden 28'; Dabo (yellow card) 54'; Hamer (yellow card) 66'	Stadium: Pride Park Stadium; Attendance: 24,264; Referee: Darren Bond

2 April 2022 40	Derby County	1–0	Preston North End	Derby
15:00 BST	Bird (red card) 55'; Davies (yellow card) 66'; Morrison 80'; Knight (yellow card) 84'	Report	Lindsay (red card) 32'; Whiteman (yellow card) 61'; Johnson (yellow card) 87'	Stadium: Pride Park Stadium; Attendance: 23,600; Referee: Geoff Eltringham

9 April 2022 41	Swansea City	2–1	Derby County	Landore
15:00 BST	Piroe 8', 16'; Grimes (yellow card) 68'; Wolf (yellow card) 84'	Report	Lawrence 22' (pen.); Morrison (yellow card) 81'	Stadium: Swansea.com Stadium; Attendance: 18,374; Referee: Tim Robinson

15 April 2022 42	Derby County	2–1	Fulham	Derby
20:00 BST	Thompson (yellow card) 33'; Plange 51'; Lawrence (yellow card) 61'; Adarabioyo 73' (o.g.); Allsop (yellow card) 89'; Cashin (yellow card) 90'	Report	Carvalho 20'; Bryan (yellow card) 90+6'	Stadium: Pride Park Stadium; Attendance: 23,773; Referee: Robert Jones

18 April 2022 43	Queens Park Rangers	1–0	Derby County	Shepherd's Bush
15:00 BST	Dozzell (yellow card) 59'; Field (yellow card) 72'; Amos 88'	Report	Lawrence (yellow card) 56' (yellow-red card) 90+8'	Stadium: Kiyan Prince Foundation Stadium; Attendance: 15,298; Referee: Josh Smith

23 April 2022 44	Derby County	1–3	Bristol City	Derby
15:00 BST	Byrne (yellow card) 54'; Forsyth 61'	Report	Williams (yellow card) 9'; Weimann 10'; Benarous (yellow card) 16'; Semenyo 38', (yellow card) 63'; Klose 79'	Stadium: Pride Park Stadium; Attendance: 22,753; Referee: Thomas Bramall

30 April 2022 45	Blackpool	0–2	Derby County	Blackpool
15:00 BST	Connolly (yellow card) 81'	Report	Ebiowei 73'; Cashin 82'; Davies (yellow card) 84'; Ebosele (yellow card) 88'	Stadium: Bloomfield Road; Attendance: 15,298; Referee: Andy Davies

7 May 2022 46	Derby County	0–1	Cardiff City	Derby
12:30 BST	Thompson (yellow card) 73'	Report	Hugill 55'; Ng (yellow card) 69'; Harris (yellow card) 81'	Stadium: Pride Park Stadium; Attendance: 29,402; Referee: Keith Stroud

=== FA Cup ===
Derby were drawn away to Coventry City in the third round.

8 January 2022 Third round	Coventry City	1–0	Derby County	Coventry
12:30 GMT	Hyam 42'; Shipley (yellow card) 53'	Report	Jagielka (yellow card) 31'; Ebosele (yellow card) 57'	Stadium: The Coventry Building Society Arena; Attendance: 8,896; Referee: Andrew Madley

=== EFL Cup ===
Derby County were drawn at home to Salford City in the first round and away to Sheffield United in the second round.

10 August 2021 First round	Derby County	3–3 (5–3 p)	Salford City	Derby
19:45 BST	Ebosele (yellow card) 42'; Hutchinson 43'; Kazim-Richards 71' (pen.); Jóźwiak (yellow card) 77'; Morrison 82'	Report	Turnbull 8', (yellow card) 18'; Morris 14', 74' (pen.)	Stadium: Pride Park Stadium; Attendance: 4,747; Referee: James Bell
	Penalties
	Shinnie (penalty scored); Kazim-Richards (penalty scored); Brown (penalty scored); Forsyth (penalty scored); Watson (penalty scored)		Morris (penalty scored); Burgess (penalty missed); Touray (penalty scored); Lund (penalty scored)
Note: Live on Sky Sports

24 August 2021 Second round	Sheffield United	2–1	Derby County	Sheffield
19:45 BST	Osborn (yellow card) 43'; Freeman 53', (yellow card) 83'; Fleck (yellow card) 74'; Sharp 76'; Robinson (yellow card) 90+3'	Report	Sibley 44'	Stadium: Bramall Lane; Attendance: 7,973; Referee: Anthony Backhouse

== Transfers ==
=== Transfers in ===
Date	Pos.	Nationality	Name	From	Fee	Ref.
30 May 2021	CM	NIR	Darren Robinson	Dungannon Swifts (NIR)	Undisclosed	
1 July 2021	MF	ENG	Courtney Clarke	Whyteleafe (ENG)	Undisclosed	
1 July 2021	MF	ENG	Dubem Eze	Chelsea (ENG)	Free transfer	
1 July 2021	MF	ENG	Adebayo Fapetu	Arsenal (ENG)	Free transfer	
1 July 2021	FW	ENG	Reece Nicholas-Davies	Fulham (ENG)	Free transfer	
1 July 2021	CF	ENG	Luke Plange	Arsenal (ENG)	Free transfer	
6 August 2021	GK	ENG	Ryan Allsop	Wycombe Wanderers (ENG)	Free transfer	
6 August 2021	CB	ENG	Richard Stearman	Huddersfield Town (ENG)	Free transfer	
7 August 2021	AM	JAM	Ravel Morrison	Free agent	—N/a	
13 August 2021	GK	ENG	Harrison Foulkes	Hull City (ENG)	Free transfer	
13 August 2021	MF	GIB	Carlos Richards	West Ham United (ENG)	Free transfer	
17 August 2021	CF	ENG	Sam Baldock	Reading (ENG)	Free transfer	
17 August 2021	CB	ENG	Phil Jagielka	Sheffield United (ENG)	Free transfer	
11 September 2021	AM	ENG	Malcolm Ebiowei	Rangers (SCO)	Free transfer	

=== Loans in ===
Date from	Pos.	Nationality	Name	From	Date until	Ref.
31 January 2022	CF	ENG	Luke Plange	Crystal Palace (ENG)	End of season	

=== Loans out ===
Date from	Pos.	Nationality	Name	To	Date until	Ref.
19 November 2021	GK	ENG	Alfie Roberts	Matlock Town (ENG)		
31 January 2022	AM	ENG	Isaac Hutchinson	Crawley Town (ENG)	End of season	

=== Transfers out ===
Date	Pos.	Nationality	Name	To	Fee	Ref.
30 June 2021	CB	ENG	Joe Bateman	Mickleover (ENG)	Released	
30 June 2021	LB	ENG	Archie Brown	Lausanne-Sport (SUI)	Free transfer	
30 June 2021	GK	ENG	Scott Carson	Manchester City (ENG)	Released	
30 June 2021	LW	ENG	Cameron Cresswell	Start (NOR)	Released	
30 June 2021	GK	ENG	Bradley Foster	Ilkeston Town (ENG)	Released	
30 June 2021	GK	IRL	Harry Halwax	Cabinteely (IRL)	Released	
30 June 2021	CF	ENG	Jahmal Hector-Ingram	St Johnstone (SCO)	Released	
30 June 2021	GK	ENG	Emmanuel Idem	Swindon Town (ENG)	Released	
30 June 2021	RW	SUR	Florian Jozefzoon	Quevilly-Rouen (FRA)	Released	
30 June 2021	LB	ENG	Scott Malone	Millwall (ENG)	Free transfer	
1 July 2021	CF	ENG	Jack Marriott	Peterborough United (ENG)	Free transfer	
30 June 2021	CB	ENG	Callum Minkley	Gainsborough Trinity (ENG)	Released	
30 June 2021	GK	ENG	Jonathan Mitchell	Hartlepool United (ENG)	Released	
30 June 2021	AM	ENG	Jayden Mitchell-Lawson	Swindon Town (ENG)	Released	
30 June 2021	LW	ENG	Josh Shonibare	Free agent	Released	
30 June 2021	GK	ENG	George Sykes-Kenworthy	Boston United (ENG)	Released	
30 June 2021	CF	ENG	Martyn Waghorn	Coventry City (ENG)	Free transfer	
30 June 2021	CB	ENG	Ethan Wassall	Free agent	Released	
30 June 2021	GK	ENG	Matthew Yates	Gainsborough Trinity (ENG)	Released	
1 July 2021	RW	ENG	Jordon Ibe	Adanaspor (TUR)	Mutual consent	
4 August 2021	AM	ENG	Jack Rogers	Ilkeston Town (ENG)	Free transfer	
11 January 2022	GK	SCO	David Marshall	Queens Park Rangers (ENG)	Free transfer	
14 January 2022	DF	ENG	Phil Jagielka	Stoke City (ENG)	End of contract	
16 January 2022	MF	SCO	Graeme Shinnie	Wigan Athletic (ENG)	Undisclosed	
17 January 2022	CF	ENG	Sam Baldock	Oxford United (ENG)	End of contract	
24 January 2022	CB	ENG	Jordan Brown	Leyton Orient (ENG)	Free transfer	
24 January 2022	LB	ENG	Dylan Williams	Chelsea (ENG)	Undisclosed	
31 January 2022	CF	ENG	Luke Plange	Crystal Palace (ENG)	Undisclosed	
6 March 2022	AM	NIR	Omari Kellyman	Aston Villa (ENG)	£600,000	
11 March 2022	LW	POL	Kamil Jóźwiak	Charlotte (USA)	Undisclosed	

== Statistics ==
=== Appearances and goals ===
No.	Pos	Nat	Player	Total		Championship		FA Cup		League Cup	
No.	Pos	Nat	Player	Apps	Goals	Apps	Goals	Apps	Goals	Apps	Goals
Goalkeepers
21	GK	(Netherlands) NED	Kelle Roos	18	0	17+1	0	0	0	0	0
31	GK	(England) ENG	Ryan Allsop	33	0	29+1	0	1	0	2	0
50	GK	(England) ENG	Alfie Roberts	0	0	0	0	0	0	0	0
Defenders
2	DF	(England) ENG	Nathan Byrne	41	0	41	0	0	0	0	0
3	DF	(Scotland) SCO	Craig Forsyth	29	3	23+3	3	1	0	2	0
16	DF	(England) ENG	Richard Stearman	15	0	10+4	0	0	0	1	0
22	DF	(England) ENG	Max Bardell	0	0	0	0	0	0	0	0
26	DF	(England) ENG	Lee Buchanan	31	0	24+6	0	0	0	0+1	0
33	DF	(England) ENG	Curtis Davies	47	4	46	4	1	0	0	0
36	DF	(Republic of Ireland) IRL	Festy Ebosele	37	2	18+17	2	1	0	1	0
37	DF	(England) ENG	Kornell McDonald	1	0	0	0	0	0	1	0
41	DF	(Republic of Ireland) IRL	Eiran Cashin	18	1	14+4	1	0	0	0	0
Midfielders
5	MF	(Poland) POL	Krystian Bielik	15	1	12+3	1	0	0	0	0
8	MF	(England) ENG	Max Bird	43	2	41+1	2	1	0	0	0
10	MF	(Wales) WAL	Tom Lawrence	39	11	37+1	11	1	0	0	0
11	MF	(Jamaica) JAM	Ravel Morrison	38	5	25+11	4	1	0	1	1
17	MF	(England) ENG	Louie Sibley	28	1	11+15	1	0	0	2	0
32	MF	(England) ENG	Malcolm Ebiowei	16	1	11+5	1	0	0	0	0
35	MF	(Republic of Ireland) IRL	Louie Watson	6	0	3+1	0	0	0	2	0
38	MF	(Republic of Ireland) IRL	Jason Knight	39	3	31+7	3	1	0	0	0
40	MF	(England) ENG	Isaac Hutchinson	3	1	0+1	0	0	0	2	1
42	MF	(England) ENG	Liam Thompson	24	0	19+4	0	1	0	0	0
44	MF	(Germany) GER	Osazee Aghatise	3	0	0+3	0	0	0	0	0
47	MF	(Northern Ireland) NIR	Darren Robinson	1	0	0+1	0	0	0	0	0
Forwards
13	FW	(Turkey) TUR	Colin Kazim-Richards	25	4	5+18	3	1	0	0+1	1
34	FW	(Scotland) SCO	Jack Stretton	12	1	1+8	1	0+1	0	2	0
39	FW	(England) ENG	Marko Borkovic	1	0	0	0	0	0	0+1	0
48	FW	(England) ENG	Luke Plange	27	4	19+7	4	0+1	0	0	0
49	FW	(Poland) POL	Bartosz Cybulski	4	0	1+3	0	0	0	0	0
Players transferred out during the season
1	GK	(Scotland) SCO	David Marshall	0	0	0	0	0	0	0	0
4	MF	(Scotland) SCO	Graeme Shinnie	23	1	21	1	0+1	0	0+1	0
6	DF	(England) ENG	Phil Jagielka	21	0	20	0	1	0	0	0
7	MF	(Poland) POL	Kamil Jóźwiak	20	0	13+4	0	0+1	0	2	0
9	FW	(England) ENG	Sam Baldock	14	2	12+1	2	0+1	0	0	0
32	DF	(England) ENG	Jordan Brown	2	0	0	0	0	0	2	0
43	DF	(England) ENG	Dylan Williams	8	0	2+4	0	0	0	2	0
46	FW	(Northern Ireland) NIR	Omari Kellyman	0	0	0	0	0	0	0	0

Source: Competitions
