= Jason Knight (footballer) =

Irish footballer (born 2001)

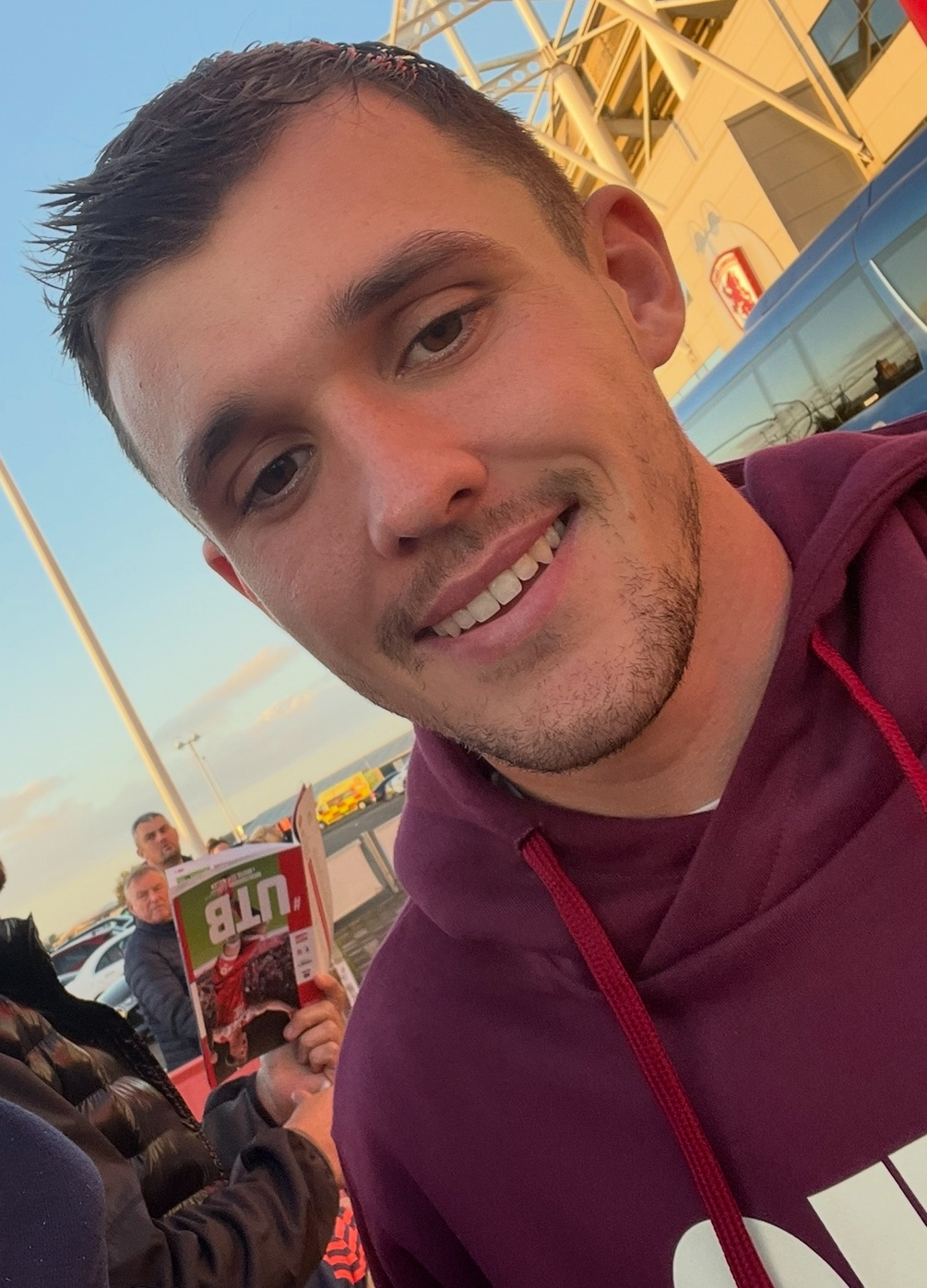
- Knight in 2024.

Personal information
- Full name: Jason Paul Knight
- Date of birth: 13 February 2001 (age 25)
- Place of birth: Dublin, Ireland
- Height: 1.73 m (5 ft 8 in)
- Position: Midfielder

Team information
- Current team: Bristol City
- Number: 12

Youth career
- 2005–2017: Cabinteely
- 2017–2019: Derby County

Senior career*
Years	Team	Apps	(Gls)
2019–2023	Derby County	150	(12)
2023–	Bristol City	127	(8)

International career^{‡}
2017–2018	Republic of Ireland U17	12	(0)
2018	Republic of Ireland U18	3	(0)
2018–2019	Republic of Ireland U19	6	(1)
2019–2020	Republic of Ireland U21	7	(0)
2020–	Republic of Ireland	46	(1)
- * Club domestic league appearances and goals as of 2 May 2026 (UTC) ‡ National team caps and goals as of 21:54, 4 October 2026 (UTC)

Jason Paul Knight (born 13 February 2001) is an Irish professional footballer who plays as a midfielder for EFL Championship club Bristol City and for the Republic of Ireland national team.

== Club career ==
=== Early career ===
Knight began his career at Cabinteely, playing for the club from age 4. He was signed by Derby County at age 16.

=== Derby County ===
During the 2018–19 season, Knight was a part of Derby's U18 Premier League title success. He was an unused substitute in Derby's play-off second leg against Leeds United and the final against Aston Villa in which Derby missed out on promotion to the Premier League.

In the 2019–20 season under a new manager, Phillip Cocu, Knight was a regular in the first team squad and made his first team debut on 5 August 2019 in a 2–1 win away at Huddersfield Town. He scored twice in a 2–1 win over Charlton Athletic on 30 December 2019. On 22 January 2020, he signed a new contract with Derby running until June 2023. Knight made 35 appearances during the season, scoring six goals as Derby finished 10th in the table.

The 2020–21 season was a struggle for the club as Cocu was sacked in November 2020. Knight played 45 times scoring twice in the league against Millwall and Birmingham City both in December 2020. On 16 January 2021, Knight was handed his first captaincy for Derby County, in Wayne Rooney's first game as coach against Rotherham United. At the end of the season, Derby avoid relegation by one point.

In the 2021–22 pre-season, Knight received an ankle injury after a tackle by Rooney in training, which meant he missed the entire pre-season and opening month of the regular season. He returned just before Derby's season was brought into further turmoil when the club was placed into administration in September 2021, ensuring a deduction of 12 points, a further nine point deduction was imposed in November 2021. Knight made his 100th appearance for the club in 2–0 win over Sheffield United on 15 January 2022. He scored twice in 39 appearances during the season, but the club was not able to overcome the 21 point deduction and was relegated to EFL League One in April 2022.

In the 2022–23 season, Knight was often deployed as a right wing back by the interim manager Liam Rosenior, showing his versatility as a player. After Paul Warne was appointed manager in September 2022, Knight returned to his regular midfield role and, after an impressive performance against Port Vale, Warne described Knight as a "joy to watch". Knight scored three times in 47 appearances during a season in which Derby missed the play-offs by one point; one of these goals was in his 150th appearance for Derby in a 5–0 win over Morecambe on 4 February 2023. At the end of the 2022–23 season, an option was activated on Knight's contract, triggering an extension until June 2024.

=== Bristol City ===
Knight joined Bristol City on 11 July 2023, signing a four-year contract as an undisclosed fee was agreed between the clubs. He scored his first goals for Bristol City when he scored twice in a 5–1 win over Oxford United in the EFL Cup on 9 August 2023. On 1 September 2023, it was announced that Knight had been voted August's Player of the Month by season ticket holders and city members. Knight secured 50% of the votes.

== International career ==
Knight has represented Ireland at every level from under-15 up to under-21 and made his debut for the senior team away to Finland on 14 October 2020. He made his full debut against Bulgaria in the UEFA Nations League on 18 November 2020. He scored his first senior international goal on 3 June 2021 in a 4–1 win over Andorra in a friendly at the Estadi Nacional.

== Personal life ==
Knight was educated at Clonkeen College in Deansgrange, Dublin. His older brother, Kevin Knight was also a footballer, a former Leicester City youth and Republic of Ireland under-19 international, who also played in the League of Ireland with Bray Wanderers, Cabinteely, Shamrock Rovers B, Athlone Town and Longford Town. His two younger brothers Conor and Rhys Knight are also footballers. Conor plays for Bray Wanderers, while Rhys plays for Bristol City's under-21 team.

== Career statistics ==
=== Club ===
As of match played 2 May 2026

Appearances and goals by club, season and competition
Club	Season	League			FA Cup		EFL Cup		Other		Total	
Club	Season	Division	Apps	Goals	Apps	Goals	Apps	Goals	Apps	Goals	Apps	Goals
Derby County	2019–20	Championship	31	6	3	0	1	0	—		35	6
Derby County	2020–21	Championship	43	2	0	0	2	1	—		45	3
Derby County	2021–22	Championship	38	2	1	0	0	0	—		39	2
Derby County	2022–23	League One	38	2	3	1	3	0	3 (Note: Appearance(s) in EFL Trophy)	0	47	3
Derby County	Total		150	12	7	1	6	1	3	0	166	14
Bristol City	2023–24	Championship	46	4	4	1	2	2	—		52	7
Bristol City	2024–25	Championship	46	3	1	0	1	0	2 (Note: Appearances in the 2024–25 EFL Championship play-offs)	0	50	3
Bristol City	2025–26	Championship	34	0	2	0	2	1	—		38	1
Bristol City	Total		126	7	7	1	5	3	2	0	140	11
Career total			276	19	14	2	11	4	5	0	306	25

=== International ===
As of match played 4 October 2026

Appearances and goals by national team and year
National team	Year	Apps	Goals
Republic of Ireland	2020	3	0
Republic of Ireland	2021	6	1
Republic of Ireland	2022	8	0
Republic of Ireland	2023	9	0
Republic of Ireland	2024	9	0
Republic of Ireland	2025	6	0
Republic of Ireland	2026	5	0
Total		46	1

Scores and results list Republic of Ireland's goal tally first, score column indicates score after each Knight goal.

List of international goals scored by Jason Knight
No.	Date	Venue	Opponent	Score	Result	Competition
1	3 June 2021	Estadi Nacional, Andorra la Vella, Andorra	Andorra	3–1	4–1	Friendly

== Honours ==
Individual

- FAI Under-18 International Player of the Year: 2019
- FAI Under-16 International Player of the Year: 2017
