= Jake Rooney =

English footballer (born 2003)

Personal information
- Full name: Jake Richard Rooney
- Date of birth: 22 August 2003 (age 23)
- Place of birth: Liverpool, England
- Height: 1.88 m (6 ft 2 in)
- Position: Defender

Team information
- Current team: Boston United

Youth career
- 2014–2018: Tranmere Rovers
- 2018–2022: Burnley

Senior career*
Years	Team	Apps	(Gls)
2022–2026	Derby County	12	(0)
2025–2026	→ Barnsley (loan)	1	(0)
2026	Boston United (loan)	16	(3)
2026–	Boston United	0	(0)
- * Club domestic league appearances and goals as of 20:17, 24 July 2026 (UTC)

Jake Richard Rooney (born 22 August 2003) is an English professional footballer who plays as a defender for National League club Boston United.

Rooney spent time in the academies at Tranmere Rovers and Burnley, before signing with Derby County's under-21 in August 2022, he would make his league debut for Derby County in November 2022, in July 2023 Rooney signed a three-year contract at Derby, in August 2023, Rooney picked up an anterior cruciate ligament injury which left him on the sidelines for a year. After this setback, Rooney was loaned to Barnsley on a one year deal, but this deal was terminated in January 2026. Later in the month, he joined Boston United on loan until the end of the season. In June 2026, he left Derby County at the expiry of his contract before signing a permanent deal with Boston United.

== Personal life ==
Rooney is a cousin of former England and Manchester United captain Wayne Rooney and Macclesfield manager John Rooney.

== Career ==
=== Youth career ===
Rooney joined the Burnley academy at age 14, after leaving Tranmere Rovers following the closure of their academy.

=== Derby County ===
He joined Derby County on 8 August 2022, following a trial period with the club, and made his debut the following day, playing 63 minutes of Derby's 2–1 EFL Cup first round win at Mansfield Town. Rooney would make his first league appearance in a 3–1 win at Milton Keynes Dons on 14 November 2022, playing the entire 90 minutes. Rooney would feature in the majority of first team matchday squads during the season as he made a total 18 appearances during his first season with the club.

On 11 July 2023 it was announced that Rooney had signed a three-year contract extension, extending his stay at Derby until June 2026. At the start of the 2023–24 season, Rooney would feature as an unused substitute in Derby's opening four games of the season, but after injuries to Joe Ward and Kane Wilson, Rooney would start the next three games at right-back, in the third of these games against Bolton Wanderers on 2 September Rooney was substituted off after 14 after a serious looking injury. He underwent a scan to check the severity of the injury, on 6 September 2023 the scan results confirmed anterior cruciate ligament damage in his right knee, with the 20-year old defender expected to be sidelined for a "significant period". In a February 2024 interview to the Derby Telegraph, Rooney thanked the support of the club, his teammates and family during his recovery and took up his hobby of playing the guitar during his rehab, which was said to be going "better than expected" with a return to training before the end of the season possible. Rooney did not feature in any further games for Derby in 2023–24; he made a total of three appearances for Derby during the season, as they secured promotion to the Championship.

Rooney returned to action in a 2024–25 pre-season friendly against Matlock Town on 12 July 2024. However just a week later in a pre-season training camp in Spain, Rooney picked up another knee injury which is expected to rule him out for the first four months of the season.

After a two-year absence; Rooney appeared for the first team on 12 August 2025, in Derby's EFL Cup match at West Bromwich Albion.

Rooney was linked with either a loan move or permanent move away from The Rams during the 2025 summer transfer window. On 1 September 2025, Rooney would complete a deadline-day loan move to EFL League One outfit Barnsley for one year. At Barnsley, he linked up with former team-mates David McGoldrick as well as Conor Hourihane, who is the current Barnsley manager. After making seven appearances for Barnsley, with only of these being in the league Rooney's loan was terminated on 1 January 2026.

On 30 January 2026, Rooney joined National League club Boston United on loan for the remainder of the season. A day later, Rooney made his Boston United debut in a 2–1 win at Boreham Wood. On 14 February 2026, Rooney scored his first goals for Boston United and in senior football when he netted twice in a 6–3 win at Scunthorpe United. Rooney played 16 times for Boston United during his loan spell, scoring three goals.

On 15 May 2026, it was announced that Rooney would leave Derby County upon the expiry of his contract in June 2026, he played 23 times for the club during a four-year spell.

=== Boston United ===
On 23 July 2026 Rooney signed for Boston United on a permanent deal.

== Career statistics ==
As of match played 25 April 2026

Appearances and goals by club, season and competition
Club	Season	League			FA Cup		League Cup		Other		Total	
Club	Season	Division	Apps	Goals	Apps	Goals	Apps	Goals	Apps	Goals	Apps	Goals
Derby County	2022–23	League One	9	0	4	0	3	0	2 (Note: Appearances in EFL Trophy)	0	18	0
Derby County	2023–24	League One	3	0	0	0	0	0	0	0	3	0
Derby County	2024–25	Championship	0	0	0	0	0	0	—		0	0
Derby County	2025–26	Championship	0	0	0	0	2	0	—		2	0
Derby County	Total		12	0	4	0	5	0	2	0	23	0
Barnsley (loan)	2025–26	League One	1	0	2	0	1	0	3	0	7	0
Boston United (loan)	2025–26	National League	16	3	—		—		—		16	3
Boston United	2026–27	National League	0	0	0	0	—		0	0	0	0
Career total			29	3	6	0	6	0	5	0	46	3

== Honours ==
Derby County

- EFL League One second-place promotion: 2023–24
