= 2019–20 Premier League International Cup =

Tournament details
- Dates: 11 September 2019 – 10 March 2020 (Remaining matches cancelled)
- Teams: 24 (from 7 associations)

Final positions
- Champions: Not awarded

Tournament statistics
- Matches played: 38
- Goals scored: 128 (3.37 per match)
- Top scorer: (Wales) Liam Cullen Swansea City (7 goals)

The 2019–20 Premier League International Cup was the sixth season of the Premier League International Cup, a European club football competition organised by the Premier League for under-23 players. Bayern Munich were champions in the previous season, after beating Dinamo Zagreb 2–0 in the final, but they were unable to defend their title as they did not enter this season's tournament.

The tournament was suspended due to the COVID-19 pandemic after quarter-final matches on 10 March 2020, and was originally to restart on 25 June 2020. However, the season was eventually cancelled on 1 May 2020.

== Format ==
The competition features twenty-four teams: twelve from English league system and twelve invitees from other European countries. The teams are split into six groups of four - with two English league clubs per group. The group winners, and two best runners-up, will progress into the knockout phase of the tournament. The knockout matches will be single leg fixtures.

All matches - including fixtures between non-English teams - will be played in England and Wales.

=== Teams ===
English league system:

- (England) Arsenal
- (England) Blackburn Rovers
- (England) Brighton & Hove Albion
- (England) Derby County
- (England) Everton
- (England) Leicester City
- (England) Liverpool
- (England) Newcastle United
- (England) Southampton
- (England) West Ham United
- (England) Wolverhampton Wanderers
- (Wales) Swansea City

Other countries:

- (Spain) Athletic Bilbao
- (Spain) Valencia
- (Spain) Villarreal
- (Germany) Hertha BSC
- (Germany) VfL Wolfsburg
- (Netherlands) Feyenoord
- (Netherlands) PSV Eindhoven
- (Portugal) Benfica
- (Portugal) Porto
- (France) Paris Saint-Germain
- (Croatia) Dinamo Zagreb
- AS Monaco

== Group stage ==
Color key in group tables
Group winners and the two best runners-up advance to the quarterfinals

=== Group A ===
Team	Pld	W	D	L	GF	GA	GD	Pts
(England) Arsenal (Q)	3	3	0	0	9	2	+7	9
(England) Leicester City	3	2	0	1	4	5	−1	6
(Croatia) Dinamo Zagreb	3	1	0	2	5	6	−1	3
(Spain) Villarreal	3	0	0	3	2	7	−5	0

25 September 2019	Dinamo Zagreb (Croatia)	2–1	(Spain) Villarreal	Aldershot
19:00 BST (UTC+1)	Kulenović 39' (pen.); Marin 45'	Report	Collado 52'	Stadium: Recreation Ground

27 November 2019	Arsenal (England)	3–0	(Spain) Villarreal	Borehamwood
19:00 GMT (UTC±00:00)	Tormey 7'; Emile Smith-Rowe 54'; Coyle 79'			Stadium: Meadow Park

17 December 2019	Arsenal (England)	3–2	(Croatia) Dinamo Zagreb	Borehamwood
19:00 GMT (UTC±00:00)	John-Jules 35', 90'; Olayinka 55'	Report	Marin 7'; Baturina 79'	Stadium: Meadow Park

18 December 2019	Leicester City (England)	2–1	(Spain) Villarreal	Whetstone
19:00 GMT (UTC±00:00)	Hirst 24'; Eppiah 25'	Report	Millán 43'	Stadium: Holmes Park; Attendance: 138

17 January 2020	Arsenal (England)	3–0	(England) Leicester City	Borehamwood
19:00 GMT (UTC±00:00)	Burton 25' (pen.); Balogun 59'; Olayinka 76'	Report		Stadium: Meadow Park

27 January 2020	Leicester City (England)	2–1	(Croatia) Dinamo Zagreb	Whetstone
TBC GMT (UTC±00:00)	Wright 29', 59'	Report	Šipoš 22'	Stadium: Holmes Park; Attendance: 256

=== Group B ===
Team	Pld	W	D	L	GF	GA	GD	Pts
(Germany) VfL Wolfsburg (Q)	3	3	0	0	10	4	+6	9
(England) West Ham United (Q)	3	2	0	1	6	4	+2	6
(England) Brighton & Hove Albion	3	0	1	2	3	6	−3	1
(Spain) Valencia	3	0	1	2	0	5	−5	1

11 September 2019	West Ham United (England)	1–0	(Spain) Valencia	Dagenham
19:00 BST (UTC+1)	Holland 8'	Report		Stadium: Victoria Road; Referee: Gary Parsons

16 October 2019	Valencia (Spain)	0–4	(Germany) VfL Wolfsburg	Totton
19:00 BST (UTC+1)		Report	Beifus 9', 33'; Marmoush 35'; May 71' (pen.)	Stadium: Testwood Stadium; Attendance: 250; Referee: Adam Bavcar

30 October 2019	West Ham United (England)	2–3	(Germany) VfL Wolfsburg	Rush Green
19:00 GMT (UTC±00:00)	Powell 13'; Scully 45'	Report	Justvan 19', 87'; Herrmann 33'	Stadium: Rush Green Stadium; Referee: Paul Howard

27 November 2019	Brighton & Hove Albion (England)	1–3	(England) West Ham United	Crawley
19:00 GMT (UTC±00:00)	Radulovic 25'		Holland 32'; Lewis 68'; Scully 75'	Stadium: Broadfield Stadium

18 December 2019	Brighton & Hove Albion (England)	0–0	(Spain) Valencia	Lancing
19:00 GMT (UTC±00:00)				Stadium: American Express Elite Football Performance Centre

27 January 2020	Brighton & Hove Albion (England)	2–3	(Germany) VfL Wolfsburg	Crawley
19:00 GMT (UTC±00:00)	Radulovic 32'; Jenks 89'	Report	Justvan 26'; Stach 39'; Karamoko 71' (pen.)	Stadium: Broadfield Stadium

=== Group C ===
Team	Pld	W	D	L	GF	GA	GD	Pts
(Portugal) Benfica (Q)	3	2	1	0	5	3	+2	7
(England) Newcastle United	3	1	1	1	6	5	+1	4
(Germany) Hertha BSC	3	1	0	2	4	5	−1	3
(England) Blackburn Rovers	3	1	0	2	4	6	−2	3

25 September 2019	Hertha BSC (Germany)	1–2	(Portugal) Benfica	Wesham
19:00 BST (UTC+1)	Redan 57' (pen.)	Report	Pedro Henrique 75' (pen.); Csoboth 90+2'	Stadium: Mill Farm; Referee: Aaron Jackson

15 November 2019	Blackburn Rovers (England)	0–2	(Germany) Hertha BSC	Blackburn
19:00 GMT (UTC±00:00)		Report	Ernesto 78'; Gayret 90+2'	Stadium: Ewood Park; Referee: Ben Speedie

22 November 2019	Newcastle United (England)	1–1	(Portugal) Benfica	Newcastle upon Tyne
19:00 GMT (UTC±00:00)	Francillette 13'	Report	dos Anjos 34' (pen.)	Stadium: Whitley Park; Attendance: 298

25 November 2019	Blackburn Rovers (England)	1–2	(Portugal) Benfica	Leyland
19:00 GMT (UTC±00:00)	Davenport 59'		dos Anjos 84', 90'	Stadium: County Ground

11 December 2019	Newcastle United (England)	3–1	(Germany) Hertha BSC	Newcastle upon Tyne
19:00 GMT (UTC±00:00)	Fernandez 5'; Allan 23' (pen.), 90'		Ngankam 82'	Stadium: Whitley Park; Attendance: 163

20 December 2019	Newcastle United (England)	2–3	(England) Blackburn Rovers	Newcastle upon Tyne
19:00 GMT (UTC±00:00)	Allan 30' (pen.), 55'	Report 1 Report 2	Buckley 13', 75'; Chapman 16'	Stadium: Whitley Park; Attendance: 149; Referee: Martin Woods

=== Group D ===
Team	Pld	W	D	L	GF	GA	GD	Pts
(Wales) Swansea City (Q)	3	2	1	0	10	2	+8	7
(Portugal) Porto	3	1	1	1	5	8	−3	4
(Netherlands) PSV Eindhoven	3	0	3	0	3	3	0	3
(England) Everton	3	0	1	2	3	8	−5	1

19 September 2019	Swansea City (Wales)	1–1	(Netherlands) PSV Eindhoven	Landore
19:00 BST (UTC+1)	Cullen 77'	Report	Ngonge 33'	Stadium: Landore Training Centre; Referee: James Durkin

25 September 2019	Swansea City (Wales)	5–1	(Portugal) Porto	Landore
19:00 BST (UTC+1)	Cullen 6', 23'; Cooper 16', 45', 57'	Report	Diego 11'	Stadium: Landore Training Centre; Referee: Tom Reeves

30 October 2019	Everton (England)	1–1	(Netherlands) PSV Eindhoven	Southport
19:00 GMT (UTC±00:00)	Gordon 12'	Report	Soulas 90+2'	Stadium: Haig Avenue; Referee: Declan Bourne

17 December 2019	Porto (Portugal)	1–1	(Netherlands) PSV Eindhoven	Wesham
19:00 GMT (UTC±00:00)	Ferreira 48'		Ledezma 81'	Stadium: Mill Farm

20 December 2019	Everton (England)	2–3	(Portugal) Porto	Southport
19:00 GMT (UTC±00:00)	Evans 19', 90'		Vieira 10'; Bessa 34'; Sousa 68'	Stadium: Haig Avenue

27 January 2020	Everton (England)	0–4	(Wales) Swansea City	Halewood
19:00 GMT (UTC±00:00)		Report	Cullen 3', 7', 20', 59'	Stadium: USM Finch Farm; Attendance: Behind Closed Doors

=== Group E ===
Team	Pld	W	D	L	GF	GA	GD	Pts
(England) Liverpool (Q)	3	1	1	1	6	6	0	4
(France) Paris Saint-Germain	3	1	1	1	4	4	0	4
(Spain) Athletic Bilbao	3	1	1	1	3	3	0	4
(England) Wolverhampton Wanderers	3	0	3	0	4	4	0	3

30 October 2019	Athletic Bilbao (Spain)	0–1	(France) Paris Saint-Germain	Aldershot
19:00 GMT (UTC±00:00)		Report	Fressange 37'	Stadium: Recreation Ground; Referee: Richard Hulme

20 November 2019	Wolverhampton Wanderers (England)	1–1	(France) Paris Saint-Germain	Wolverhampton
19:00 GMT (UTC±00:00)	Csóka 57'		Fressange 1'	Stadium: Molineux Stadium; Attendance: 5,448

27 November 2019	Wolverhampton Wanderers (England)	1–1	(Spain) Athletic Bilbao	Burton-upon-Trent
19:00 GMT (UTC±00:00)	Ashley-Seal 4'		Guruzeta 59'	Stadium: St George's Park

20 December 2019	Liverpool (England)	3–2	(France) Paris Saint-Germain	Kirkby
19:00 GMT (UTC±00:00)	Bearne 7'; Dixon-Bonner 90'; Larouci 90'		Fressange 39'; Mbe Soh 59'	Stadium: Liverpool Academy

8 January 2020	Liverpool (England)	1–2	(Spain) Athletic Bilbao	Kirkby
19:00 GMT (UTC±00:00)	Bearne 82'	Report	Baqué 20', 35'	Stadium: Liverpool Academy

29 January 2020	Wolverhampton Wanderers (England)	2–2	(England) Liverpool	Wolverhampton
19:00 GMT (UTC±00:00)	Jordão 13'; Dadashov 47'		Hardy 52'; Elliott 54'	Stadium: Molineux Stadium; Attendance: 4,394

=== Group F ===
Team	Pld	W	D	L	GF	GA	GD	Pts
(England) Derby County (Q)	3	3	0	0	7	2	+5	9
AS Monaco (Q)	3	2	0	1	6	3	+3	6
(Netherlands) Feyenoord	3	1	0	2	4	6	−2	3
(England) Southampton	3	0	0	3	2	8	−6	0

26 September 2019	Derby County (England)	2–0	AS Monaco	Loughborough
19:00 BST (UTC+1)	Minkley 66'; Hector-Ingram 77' (pen.)	Report		Stadium: Loughborough University Stadium; Referee: Sam Barrott

15 October 2019	AS Monaco	3–1	(Netherlands) Feyenoord	Dagenham
19:00 BST (UTC+1)	Ibouroi 32'; Alioui 62'; Faivre 75' (pen.)	Report	Lake 86'	Stadium: Victoria Road; Referee: Tim Danaskos

29 October 2019	Southampton (England)	1–2	(Netherlands) Feyenoord	Marchwood
19:00 GMT (UTC±00:00)	El Bouchataoui 41' (o.g.)	Report	Naujoks 61'; Burger 83'	Stadium: Staplewood Campus

7 November 2019	Derby County (England)	2–1	(Netherlands) Feyenoord	Loughborough
19:00 GMT (UTC±00:00)	Hector-Ingram 63' (pen.); Bennett 87' (pen.)		De Mooij 46'	Stadium: Loughborough University Stadium; Attendance: 162

27 November 2019	Southampton (England)	0–3	AS Monaco	Marchwood
19:00 GMT (UTC±00:00)		Report	Alioui 62', 73'; Naes 74'	Stadium: Staplewood Campus; Attendance: 200

10 December 2019	Derby County (England)	3–1	(England) Southampton	Loughborough
19:00 GMT (UTC±00:00)	Minkley 32'; Shonibare 49'; Hector-Ingram 69' (pen.)	Report	Brennan 78'	Stadium: Loughborough University Stadium; Attendance: 105

=== Ranking of second-placed teams ===
Team	Pld	W	D	L	GF	GA	GD	Pts
AS Monaco (Q)	3	2	0	1	6	3	+3	6
(England) West Ham United (Q)	3	2	0	1	6	4	+2	6
(England) Leicester City (E)	3	2	0	1	4	5	−1	6
(England) Newcastle United (E)	3	1	1	1	6	5	+1	4
(Spain) Athletic Bilbao (E)	3	1	1	1	3	3	0	4
(Portugal) Porto (E)	3	1	1	1	5	8	−3	4

== Knockout stages ==
=== Quarter-finals ===
3 March 2020	Arsenal (England)	4–3	AS Monaco	Borehamwood
	Medley 17', 24'; Balogun 68' (pen.), 90+3'	Report	Sylla 20'; Millot 29'; Maes 50'	Stadium: Meadow Park

10 March 2020	Derby County (England)	3–3 (a.e.t.) (5–6 p)	(England) West Ham United	Derby
	Hector-Ingram 34' (pen.), 83'; J. Brown 51'	Report	Afolayan 4', 8'; Rosa 73'	Stadium: Pride Park
	Penalties
	Babos (penalty scored); A. Brown (penalty scored); Cresswell (penalty missed); Stretton (penalty scored); Hector-Ingram (penalty missed); J. Brown (penalty scored); Ebosele (penalty scored); Wilson (penalty missed)		(penalty scored) Rosa; (penalty scored) Ashby; (penalty scored) Djú; (penalty missed) Odubeko; (penalty missed) Silva; (penalty scored) Sánchez; (penalty scored) Akinola; (penalty scored) Okotcha

25 June 2020	Liverpool (England)	Cancelled	(Germany) VfL Wolfsburg	Kirkby
--:--				Stadium: Liverpool Academy
Note: This fixture, originally scheduled for 10 March 2020, was postponed after VfL Wolfsburg decided not to travel to the UK due to concerns over the spread of the coronavirus.

26 June 2020	Swansea City (Wales)	Cancelled	(Portugal) Benfica	Landore
--:--				Stadium: Landore Training Centre
Note: This fixture, originally scheduled for 11 March 2020, was postponed after Benfica decided not to travel to the UK due to concerns over the spread of the coronavirus.
