= Andre Wisdom =

English footballer (born 1993)

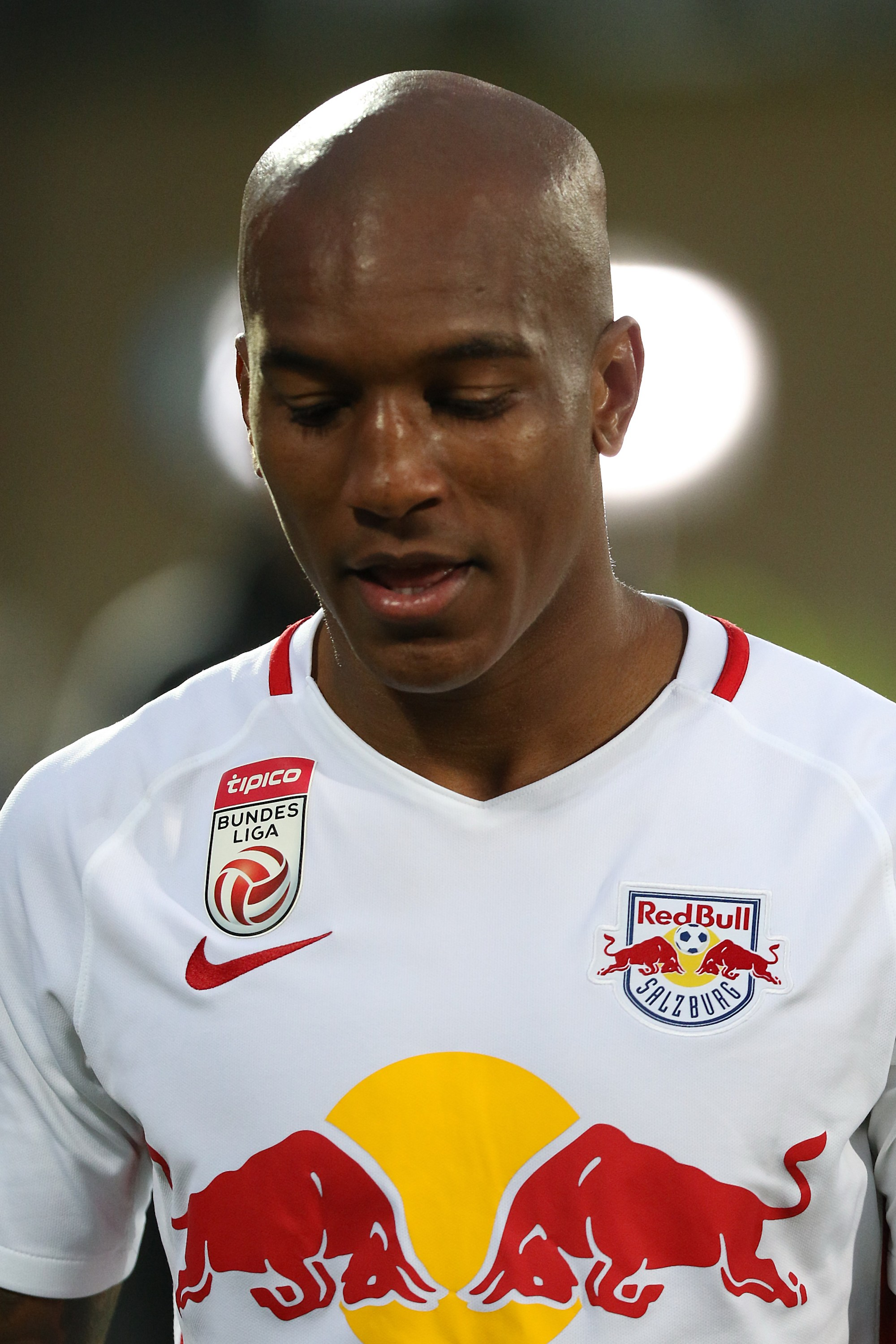
- Wisdom playing for Red Bull Salzburg in 2017

Personal information
- Full name: Andre Alexander Shaquille Wisdom
- Date of birth: 9 May 1993 (age 33)
- Place of birth: Leeds, England
- Height: 6 ft 1 in (1.86 m)
- Positions: Right back; centre back

Team information
- Current team: FC United of Manchester

Youth career
- 2004–2008: Bradford City
- 2008–2012: Liverpool

Senior career*
Years	Team	Apps	(Gls)
2012–2017	Liverpool	14	(0)
2013–2014	→ Derby County (loan)	34	(0)
2014–2015	→ West Bromwich Albion (loan)	24	(0)
2015–2016	→ Norwich City (loan)	10	(0)
2016–2017	→ Red Bull Salzburg (loan)	16	(0)
2017–2021	Derby County	97	(1)
2023–2024	Warrington Town	34	(1)
2024	Derry City	9	(0)
2025–	FC United of Manchester	25	(1)

International career
2008	England U16	2	(0)
2009–2010	England U17	15	(3)
2010–2012	England U19	10	(0)
2011–2013	England U21	10	(0)
Medal record
Men's football
Representing England
UEFA European Under-17 Championship
Winner	2010 Liechtenstein
- * Club domestic league appearances and goals as of 09:15, 21 January 2025 (UTC)

Andre Alexander Shaquille Wisdom (born 9 May 1993) is an English professional footballer who plays as a right back or centre back for Northern Premier League Premier Division club FC United of Manchester.

Wisdom began his career at Bradford City before signing for Liverpool in 2008. He made his debut for the club in 2012 before enjoying loan spells with Derby County, West Bromwich Albion, Norwich City, and Red Bull Salzburg. He left Liverpool in 2017 to spend four seasons with Derby County. Wisdom has also played for and captained the England youth teams at various levels, and was part of the squad which won the UEFA European Under-17 Championship in 2010.

== Club career ==
=== Early career ===
Wisdom was born to Jamaican parents in Leeds, West Yorkshire, and grew up in the suburb of Chapeltown. He studied at Abbey Grange Church of England Academy. In his youth, he excelled in the junior teams of Bradford City and regularly played a year above his age group up to the under-15s. He signed for Liverpool as a 14-year-old in January 2008 for what his Bradford youth-team manager Peter Horne implied was an unprecedented fee for a League Two youngster.

=== Liverpool ===
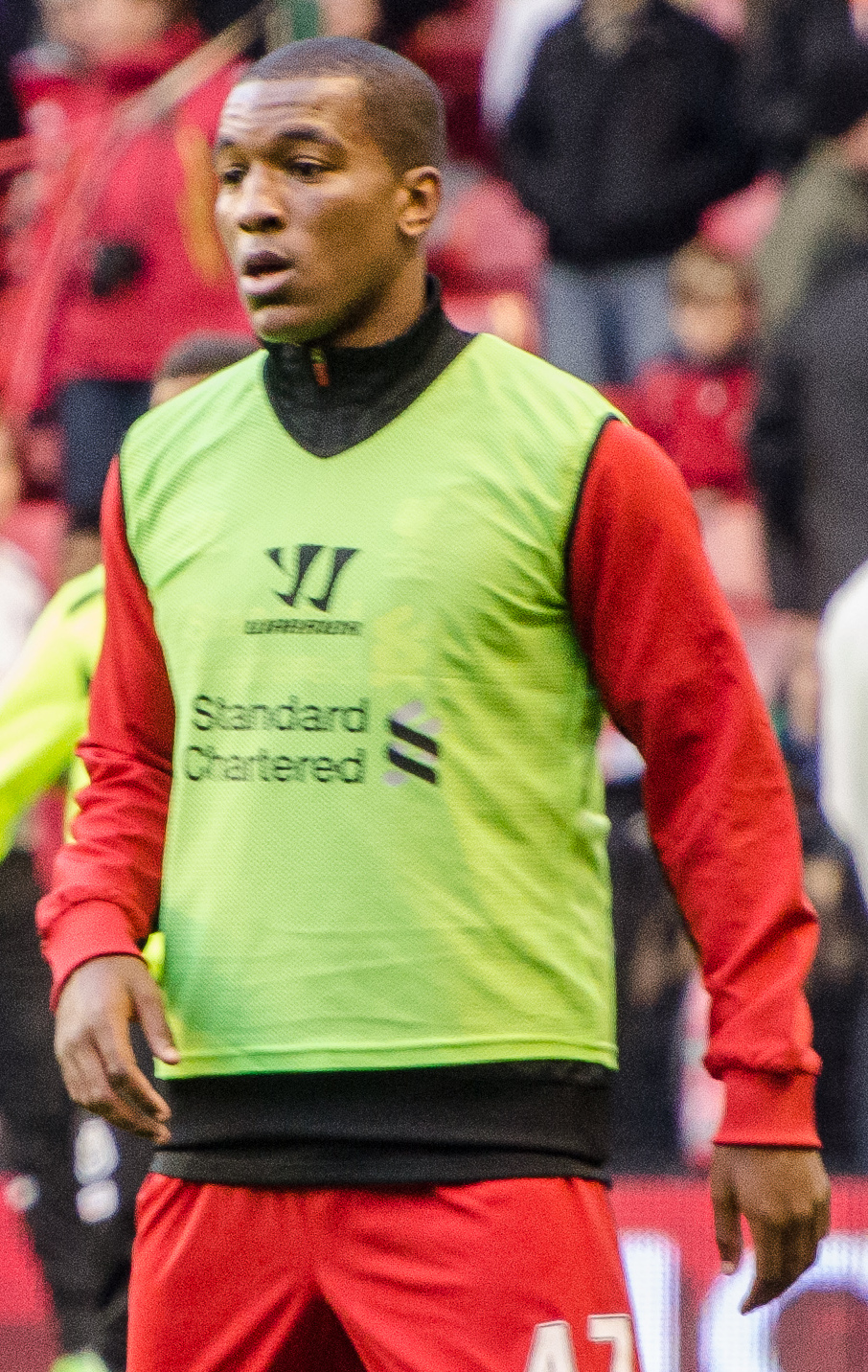
Wisdom warming up for Liverpool in 2012

Wisdom progressed through the youth teams at Liverpool before featuring for the club's reserve team. In September 2010, manager Roy Hodgson called up Wisdom to his first-team squad for the League Cup match against League Two team Northampton Town. He was rewarded for his progress with an extension to his contract by newly appointed manager Kenny Dalglish in the summer of 2011.

==== 2012–13 ====
The appointment of Brendan Rodgers in June 2012 would be Wisdom's fourth manager during his time at Anfield and would present him with a fresh opportunity to stake a claim in the first team. In September, Wisdom would travel with several other Liverpool youngsters to Switzerland for their UEFA Europa League group tie versus Young Boys. He was named in the starting line-up and scored on his debut as Liverpool won 5–3. His impressive performance in Europe would lead to further opportunities for him in the first team in the following weeks; starting in the 2–1 victory over West Bromwich Albion in the League Cup on 26 September and making his Premier League debut from the start three days later in the 5–2 win away to Norwich City. He retained his place in the first team for the following month, making his first appearance at Anfield in a goalless draw with Stoke City in doing so. He was handed his first taste of a Merseyside derby for the 2–2 draw at Everton on 28 October 2012.

On 9 January 2013, Wisdom signed a new long-term contract with Liverpool.

==== 2013–14: Loan to Derby County ====
On 22 October 2013, Wisdom signed a season-long loan at Championship club Derby County in order to progress his development. He went straight into Derby's back four and made his debut in the 1–1 home draw against Birmingham City on 26 October. An ever-present in the team, he left the club in May 2014 after playing at Wembley against QPR in the Championship play-off final, which Derby lost by the only goal of the game.

==== 2014–15: Loan to West Bromwich Albion ====
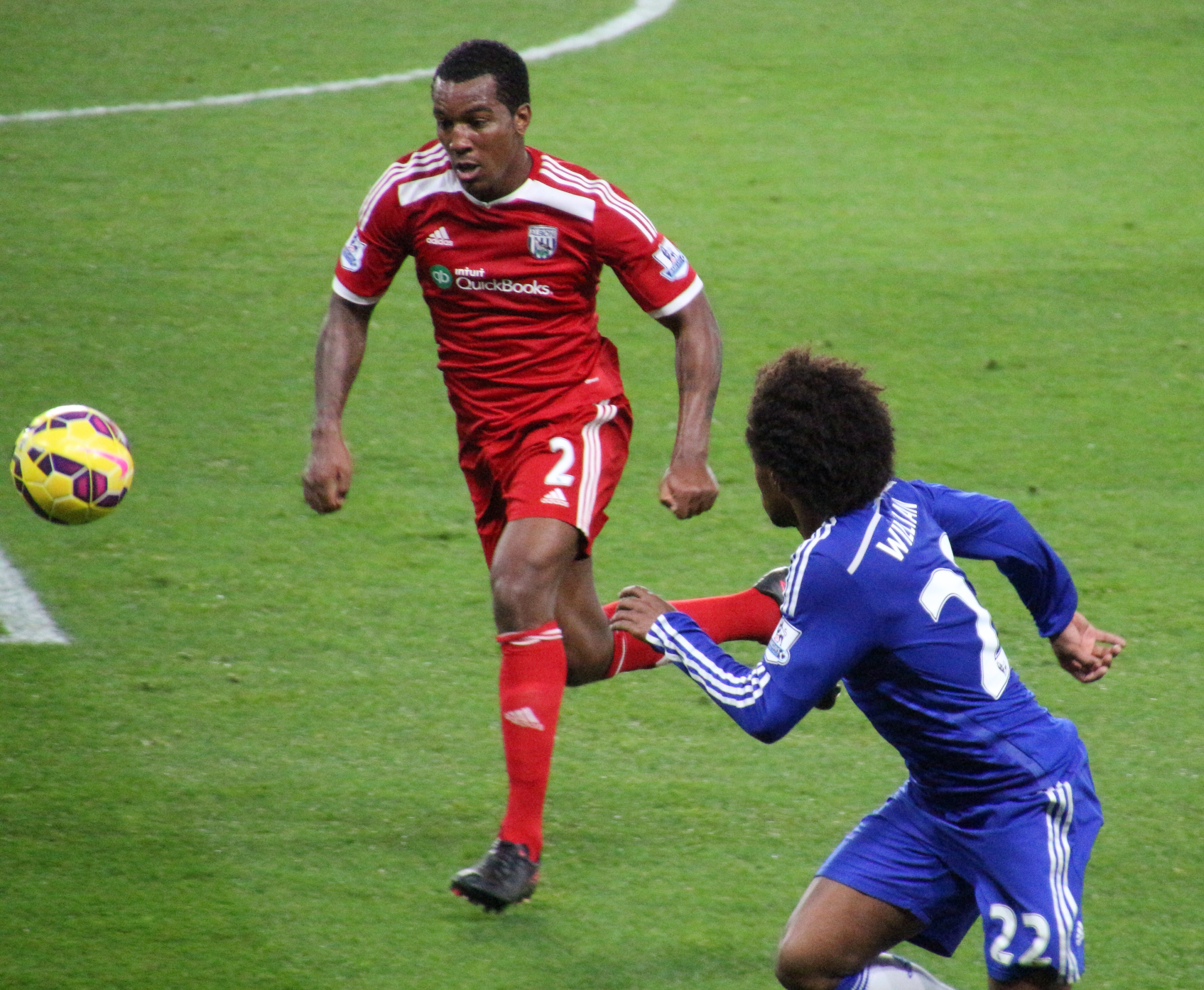
Wisdom (left) playing for West Bromwich Albion in 2014

On 22 July 2014, Wisdom joined West Bromwich Albion on a season-long loan and was assigned the number 2 shirt. Having played 22 games under manager Alan Irvine, after a 0–3 defeat to Tottenham Hotspur on 31 January 2015, he fell out of favour with new manager Tony Pulis and lost his starting place.

==== 2015–16: Loan to Norwich City ====
Having signed a new four-year contract with Liverpool ahead of the 2015–16 season on 26 May 2015, Wisdom joined Premier League newcomers Norwich City on a season-long loan on 29 July 2015.

==== 2016–17: Loan to Red Bull Salzburg ====
On 31 August 2016, he joined reigning Austrian Bundesliga champions Red Bull Salzburg on a season-long loan.

=== Derby County ===
On 3 July 2017, Wisdom joined Derby County on a permanent basis. He scored his first goal for Derby, and his first professional goal since his Liverpool debut in 2012, in a 4–2 FA Cup win over Northampton Town on 4 February 2020. He scored his first ever league goal on 16 February 2021 to secure Derby's last-minute win away to Wycombe Wanderers in the Championship. His contract expired at the end of the season, and although he trained with the financially struggling club ahead of the 2021–22 season, he did not re-sign.

After his release by Derby County, Wisdom trialled with Portsmouth, Birmingham City, Sheffield United and Polish club Warta Poznań.

=== Warrington Town ===
On 22 September 2023, Wisdom signed for National League North club Warrington Town. He made his debut the following day when playing the entirety of Warrington's 1–0 home win over King's Lynn Town.

=== Derry City ===
On 21 August 2024, Wisdom signed for League of Ireland Premier Division club Derry City until the end of their season in November. He made a total of 12 appearances for the club, the last of those coming on 10 November 2024, in the 2024 FAI Cup final, which his side lost 2–0 to Drogheda United at the Aviva Stadium.

=== FC United of Manchester ===
On 11 July 2025, Wisdom joined Northern Premier League Premier Division side FC United of Manchester.

== International career ==
=== England under-16s ===
Wisdom was called up to the England Under-16 squad for the Victory Shield tournament in the autumn of 2008. He started in the away fixture to Wales in a 1–0 victory at Stebonheath Park on 31 October. He featured again in the tournament a month later as a substitute in the 2–0 victory over Scotland at Sincil Bank as England finished top of the group and took the 2008 Victory Shield title.

=== England under-17s ===
The following year, Wisdom was called up to John Peacock's England Under-17 squads for their 2010 UEFA European Under-17 Championship campaign. England breezed through the qualifying and elite rounds to qualify for the Championship in Liechtenstein. He was selected for the final squad along with fellow Liverpool teammate and captain Conor Coady. He was an ever-present as England maintained their 100% record through to the knock-out round with victories over Czech Republic, Greece and Turkey in the group stage. England defeated France 2–1 in the semi-final with both goals coming from Ipswich Town striker Connor Wickham as they booked their place in the final for the second time in four years. Wisdom started the final versus Spain and equalised for England on the half-an-hour mark with a header from a corner after initially going a goal down. Wickham put England ahead twelve-minutes later and the score remain unchanged as the Lions won the tournament for the first ever time.

Wisdom would be one of many of the side's youngsters that would provide hope for the nation's future with the senior side crashing out of the World Cup in South Africa four weeks later after a 4–1 defeat to rivals Germany in the last-sixteen.

=== England under-19s ===
After tournament success with the under-16s and 17s, Wisdom continued to progress through the national ranks and joined up with Noel Blake's Under-19 squad during the 2010–11 season. He made his debut versus Slovakia in October and went on to make ten appearances for the side over the following two years. He failed to add to his success at younger age groups after the side failed to qualify for the 2011 UEFA European Under-19 Championship tournament and Wisdom missed out on the final squad that reached the semi-finals of the 2012 tournament.

=== England under-21s ===
Wisdom was named in a 27-man England Under-21 squad by manager Stuart Pearce in September 2011 for the 2013 UEFA European Under-21 Championship qualification match versus Azerbaijan Under-21s and the friendly match versus Israel Under-21s. He made his debut at right back against Israel in a 4–1 victory, despite failing to have featured for Liverpool at a senior level. He returned to the squad a year later for the crucial Play-off games versus Serbia but withdrew after sustaining a shoulder injury. Wisdom was appointed as captain of the England U21 side in 2013, however in his first game in the role, a qualifier against Finland, he was sent off the pitch with a straight red card after kicking an opponent intentionally. After the completion of a four-match suspension, Wisdom did not return to the squad.

== Personal life ==
In June 2020, Wisdom was taken to hospital after being stabbed in an "unprovoked assault and robbery" while visiting relatives in Toxteth, Liverpool. He has stated that he never fully recovered from his injuries and still feels pain to this day, attributing the premature decline in his career to the attack, which caused nerve damage on his left side.

As of September 2025, Wisdom is undertaking his UEFA B coaching license at Liverpool's Kirkby Academy.

Aside from his football career, Wisdom maintains a property portfolio, owning several houses around Liverpool that he rents to Liverpool F.C. as accommodation for their younger players; his former tenants include his successor at right back Trent Alexander-Arnold.

== Career statistics ==
As of match played 10 November 2024

Appearances and goals by club, season and competition
Club	Season	League			National cup (Note: Includes FA Cup, Austrian Cup)		League cup (Note: Includes Football League Cup/EFL Cup)		Other		Total	
Club	Season	Division	Apps	Goals	Apps	Goals	Apps	Goals	Apps	Goals	Apps	Goals
Liverpool	2012–13	Premier League	12	0	2	0	1	0	4 (Note: Appearances in UEFA Europa League)	1	19	1
Liverpool	2013–14	Premier League	2	0	0	0	1	0	—		3	0
Liverpool	Total		14	0	2	0	2	0	4	1	22	1
Derby County (loan)	2013–14	Championship	34	0	1	0	0	0	3 (Note: Appearances in Championship play-offs)	0	38	0
West Bromwich Albion (loan)	2014–15	Premier League	24	0	1	0	1	0	—		26	0
Norwich City (loan)	2015–16	Premier League	10	0	1	0	3	0	—		14	0
Red Bull Salzburg (loan)	2016–17	Austrian Bundesliga	16	0	3	0	—		5	0	24	0
Derby County	2017–18	Championship	30	0	1	0	1	0	2	0	34	0
Derby County	2018–19	Championship	11	0	0	0	2	0	—		13	0
Derby County	2019–20	Championship	18	0	2	1	0	0	—		20	1
Derby County	2020–21	Championship	38	1	0	0	2	0	—		40	1
Derby County	Total		97	1	3	1	5	0	2	0	107	2
Warrington Town	2023–24	National League North	34	1	—		—		1 (Note: Appearance in the FA Trophy)	0	35	1
Derry City	2024	LOI Premier Division	9	0	3	0	—		—		12	0
Career total			238	2	14	1	11	0	15	1	278	4

== Honours ==
Red Bull Salzburg

- Austrian Football Bundesliga: 2016–17
- Austrian Cup: 2016–17

England U16

- Victory Shield: 2008

England U17

- UEFA European Under-17 Championship: 2010

Individual

- UEFA European Under-17 Championship Team of the Tournament: 2010
