= 2019–20 Premier League (disambiguation) =

The 2019–20 Premier League was a professional association football league season in England.

2019–20 Premier League may also refer to:

== Association football ==
- 2019–20 Armenian Premier League
- 2019–20 Azerbaijan Premier League
- 2019–20 Dhivehi Premier League
- 2019–20 Premier League of Belize
- 2019–20 Premier League of Bosnia and Herzegovina
- 2019–20 Egyptian Premier League
- 2019–20 Hong Kong Premier League
- 2019–20 I-League
- 2019–20 Iraqi Premier League
- 2019–20 Israeli Premier League
- 2019–20 Kuwait Premier League
- 2019–20 Lebanese Premier League
- 2019–20 Maltese Premier League
- 2019–20 National Premier League (Jamaica)
- 2019–20 Russian Premier League
- 2019–20 Syrian Premier League
- 2019–20 Tanzanian Premier League
- 2019–20 Ukrainian Premier League
- 2019–20 Welsh Premier League

== Basketball ==
- 2019–20 Belarusian Premier League
- 2019–20 Israeli Basketball Premier League

== Cricket ==
- 2019–20 Bangladesh Premier League
- 2020 Indian Premier League
- 2019–20 Premier League Tournament (Sri Lanka)

== See also ==
- 2019–20 Premier League International Cup
