= 2020–21 Derby County F.C. season =

Derby County
2020–21 season
- Owner: Mel Morris
- Chairman: Mel Morris
- Manager: Phillip Cocu (until 14 November); Wayne Rooney, Liam Rosenior, Shay Given and Justin Walker (interim) (14–26 November); Wayne Rooney (from 26 November)
- Stadium: Pride Park Stadium
- Championship: 21st
- FA Cup: Third round
- EFL Cup: Second round
- Top goalscorer: League: Colin Kazim-Richards (8 goals); All: Colin Kazim Richards (8 goals)
- Biggest win: 4–0 vs. Birmingham City (A) (29 December 2020)
- Biggest defeat: 0–4 vs. Blackburn Rovers (H) (26 September 2020) & Cardiff City (A) (2 March 2021)
Home colours	Away colours	Third colours

The 2020–21 season is Derby County F.C.'s 137th season in existence, their 13th consecutive season in the Championship, and their 53rd season overall in the second division of English football. Alongside the Championship, they also competed in the FA Cup and the EFL Cup. The season covers the period from July 2020 to 30 June 2021.

== Review ==
=== Pre-season ===
It was confirmed on 24 July 2020, that the 2020/21 Championship season - delayed due to the COVID-19 pandemic - would start on the weekend beginning 12 September 2020. When the fixtures were announced on 21 August, it was revealed that Derby would start the season at home to Reading, as they had done in the 2002-03 campaign. Another notable fixture was 28 November home match vs. Wycombe Wanderers, the first-ever competitive meeting between the two sides.

The most significant off-the-field announcement came when it was revealed that the two charges bought upon the club by the EFL, namely the club's valuation associated with the sale of Pride Park Stadium in June 2018 and its amortisation policy associated with intangible fixed assets (players) were dismissed, ensuring the club would avoid a points deduction and fine for the 2020/21 campaign. The EFL later confirmed it would appeal the dismissal of the charge regarding player valuations.

The first new arrival in the playing staff was Mike te Wierik who finally arrived at the club having signed a pre-contract agreement for a three-year stay in February 2020. Ben Hamer's return to parent-club Huddersfield Town, coupled with Scott Carson and Jonathan Mitchell's loan moves to Manchester City and Northampton Town respectively, left the club in search of a goalkeeper, with the gap being filled by the acquisition of Scottish international David Marshall from Wigan Athletic. A second significant capture was the return of reigning player of the year Matthew Clarke on a season-long loan from Brighton & Hove Albion. In terms of contracts, George Evans signed a one-year extension to take his stay at the club through to 2022.

After a decade at the club, Mason Bennett left to join Millwall for an undisclosed fee. Scott Malone also moved to The Den on a season-long loan.

=== September ===
The season opened on 5 September with an EFL Cup First round tie against Barrow, whom Derby had not played competitively in 63 years, with Derby advancing on penalties after a 0–0 draw, with Kelle Roos the hero following three saves in the shoot-out itself. The absence of Jayden Bogle and Max Lowe from the starting line-up lead to rumours about their future and both players subsequently joined Premier League Sheffield United in an undisclosed deal two days later. The ensuing gap left by Bogle was filled with the signing of Wigan Athletic's Nathan Byrne three days later in another undisclosed deal.

Derby lost 2–0 at home to Reading in their opening game of the new campaign (a first opening day defeat for 11 years), before losing 2–1 at home to Preston North End in the EFL Cup second round. a first defeat to Preston in 15 meetings. In the days following the Preston defeat, Derby clinched the signing of Poland international Kamil Jóźwiak from Lech Poznań and announced Max Bird and Louie Sibley had signed new deals with the club which would take them through to the end of the 2023–24 season. Jóźwiak's debut came three days after signing as he assisted Jack Marriott for the equalizer, his first goal since January, in an eventual 2–1 defeat at Luton Town, Derby's third consecutive defeat in all competitions.

There were heavy links with Jordon Ibe, who had had a loan spell with the club in 2014-15, and former Liverpool forward Bobby Duncan; both joined the club in the week following the Luton game. Neither player featured in the next game, a 4–0 home defeat to Blackburn Rovers; a third straight league defeat condemning the Rams to their worst start to a season since the 1992-93 campaign.

=== October ===
As new signing Bobby Duncan was confirmed to initially be part of the Rams under-23s side, Derby continued making signings with one eye on the future in the capture of Southend United winger Isaac Hutchinson., former-Bradford City goalkeeper George Sykes-Kenworthy and ex-West Ham United midfielder Louie Watson.

The upcoming closure of the international transfer window on 5 October saw the club heavily linked with SV Darmstadt 98 striker Serdar Dursun and they reportedly submitted bids of £750,000 and £1m for the player, though both were rejected and no deal went through, though it was suggested Derby would revisit their interest in 2021.

The club continued its hunt for a striker within the English league and was linked with loan moves for Premier League forwards Keinan Davis of Aston Villa. and Charlie Austin of West Brom, though Austin rejected a move despite a personal phone call from club captain Wayne Rooney. Against the back drop of these transfer links, it was Rooney's 87th-minute free kick that proved the difference in 1–0 win away to Norwich City that took the club out of the bottom three and relieved some of the pressure building on Cocu going into the first international break of the season.

In the days leading up to the closure of the domestic transfer window on 16 October, Louie Sibley was linked with a move to Leeds United and Florian Jozefzoon was linked with Rotherham United; Jozefzoon duly joined The Millers until the end of the campaign. Following the collapse of a deal for Charlie Austin, Derby were linked with a move for his West Brom teammate Kenneth Zohore and also tabled a loan bid for former loanee Harry Wilson Ultimately, the club signed free agent Colin Kazim-Richards and, in a move that proved controversial amongst the fanbase, allowed Jack Marriott to leave for a season-long loan at Sheffield Wednesday, though the club retained the right to recall the forward in January and extended his contract until the end of the 2021/22 season. On the day the window closed, Derby lost 1–0 at home to Watford to continue their poor start to the season. The result was compounded three days later with the news that Wayne Rooney would have to go into self isolation for ten days following his coming into contact with a friend who was later diagnosed as having COVID-19 and miss three games as a result. The first of these games was a 1–0 defeat at Huddersfield Town, a fifth defeat in six league games, which increased the pressure manager Phillip Cocu; the Dutch press rumoured his job was "hanging by a thread" though Chairman Mel Morris publicly backed Cocu, saying "Of course we are concerned about the lack of points, as is the manager. But when you look at the cards we’ve been dealt this season, it's hardly surprising that results have been poor. Does he have our support? Yes, we have got to be realistic about the challenges he faces. This is not about a lack of tactics, or effort on the training field, or those things." The following three games, away to Nottingham Forest in the first East Midlands derby of the season, at home to Cardiff City and away to Bournemouth, were all 1–1 draws which saw Derby take the lead in the first half before being pegged-back in the second. The results lead Cocu to admit the team needed to improve their end product, as after nine league games they had only two goals from open-play.

On 30 October, rumours regarding a potential takeover of the club by Abu Dhabi-based Khalifa bin Zayed Al Nahyan, who had previously been linked to Newcastle United and Liverpool, began to surface.

=== November ===
"Phillip and his staff helped develop and establish a considerable number of Academy players in to the first team squad and Phillip made significant financial contributions and personal efforts towards the club's community projects during the COVID-19 pandemic, which the club are extremely grateful for. Derby County wishes to thank Phillip, Chris and Twan for their hard work and dedication over the last 16 months and wish them every success in their future careers."

— Derby County statement, 14 November 2020

The first game of November saw Derby lose 1–0 at home to Queens Park Rangers to further heap pressure on Phillip Cocu - former manager Steve McClaren accused Cocu and the club of "underachieving", fans referred to his claims the team did not deserve to lose as "deluded" and "a tough listen" and pundits summarised he was "on the edge" as Derby found themselves in the bottom two after just one win in their opening ten games, only being kept off the bottom by Sheffield Wednesday, who had had six points deducted. With the rumoured £60m takeover by Khaled bin Zayed Al Nehayan approved by the EFL, it was reported that Derby's players "(did) not expect the Dutchman to survive the forthcoming international break." Cocu's issues were then compounded by news he had to go into self-isolation following coming into contact with club CEO Stephen Pearce, who later tested positive for COVID-19, meaning he would absent for the match against Barnsley. The Barnsley match ended in a 2–0 defeat - Barnsley's first win at Pride Park in over a decade - and saw the Rams slump to the bottom of the table as they endured their worst start to a season in 12 years. Cocu left the club by mutual agreement on 14 November, along with assistant manager Chris van der Weerden and Specialist First Team Coach Twan Scheepers, after 16-months and 65 matches in charge. First team affairs were taken over by captain Wayne Rooney with support by members of Cocu's remaining backroom staff, Liam Rosenior, Shay Given and Justin Walker. Early links with the position included Rooney, Aston Villa assistant manager John Terry, former-Liverpool and Newcastle United manager Rafa Benitez, Swansea City boss Steve Cooper and Eddie Howe, who was unattached after his resignation from AFC Bournemouth. The first post-Cocu result once again saw defeat, 1–0 at Bristol City, to leave Derby at the foot of the table and three points from safety, though Wayne Rooney said he could guarantee that the side would "get better (and) get out of the situation we're in and... start winning games." Prior to the next game, away to Middlesbrough, the club announced the appointment of former-manager Steve McClaren as technical director to advise the board, with the "permanent status of the (position) subject to ratification by Derventio Holdings’ board following completion of the club acquisition.” The Middlesbrough match ended in another defeat, 3-0, that left Derby rooted at the foot at the table, now four points from safety. Rosenior stated that the result had to be a "watershed" moment for the club whereas Rooney found himself being an increasingly polarizing figure amongst fans for his perceived avoidance of post-match interviews after poor results and his "abject" performances on the field, with supporters calling him a "disgrace" and asking him to "leave the club now". It was announced the day after the "painful and chastening" Middlesbrough result that Rooney would take sole control of the side for the next match against Wycombe Wanderers and had removed himself from the playing squad, with Rooney admitting that it is "possible" he had played his final game. Rooney's first game as sole interim manager saw him make seven changes to the side that had lost at Middlesbrough, including handing a first start to Colin Kazim-Richards, but could not guide Derby to a second victory, as Matt Bloomfield's 81st-minute equalizer canceled out Duane Holmes' first-half goal (Derby's first goal in a month). The result left Derby bottom, though the gap from safety was reduced to five points as none of the bottom six teams were able to secure victory. The month ended with the draw for the FA Cup third round proper, which saw Derby handed a potential banana skin at National League North side Chorley.

=== December ===
""In order to remove any ongoing speculation, both parties want to assure Derby County's supporters that the acquisition of the club by Derventio Holdings is on track, with a view to completion before Christmas. Both parties will now return to applying their full attention to the completion of the deal and will not be making any further comment.""

— Derby County/Derventio Holdings joint statement, 15 December 2020

Derby blew another chance at a first win since October following another 1–1 home draw, this time against fellow strugglers Coventry City, to remain 5 points away from 21st placed Nottingham Forest after the completion of the 15th round of fixtures. Post-match, Rooney stated he had enjoyed his first week in the role despite the "frustrating" results but admitted that the proposed takeover would have to be completed before he would know if the position would be his permanently. According to local media, no candidates had been approached or interviewed, though the national media heavily linked Aston Villa assistant manager John Terry, with Rooney second favourite, whilst other sources, such as podcaster Ian McGarry, claimed they had not heard Terry's name mentioned. Rooney claimed his first win as Derby boss as Jason Knight scored a 69th-minute winner at Millwall to give Derby a first victory in two months and twelve matches to take them off the bottom and to within two points of Nottingham Forest in 21st. The run of five points from three games saw Rooney overtake Terry to become the bookmaker's favourite for the position, with former-England manager Sam Allardyce (who instead replaced Slaven Bilić at West Bromwich Albion) and Burnley boss Sean Dyche being newly linked to the role. Rooney strengthened his claims by extending his unbeaten start to six games with a 0–0 draw away to Brentford being followed with a 0–0 draw at home to Stoke City (in which Derby were controversially denied a penalty for a foul on Lee Buchanan, about which ex-Premier League referee Mark Halsey said that Derby had "every reason to be unhappy.") and a first home win in thirteen attempts with a 2–0 win over Swansea City, which moved The Rams level on points with 20th placed Rotherham United, though still in the bottom three on goal difference. Rotherham were due to be the next opponents, but the match at the New York Stadium was postponed 90-minutes before kick-off due to a COVID-19 outbreak in Rotherham's squad. Derby's unbeaten run ended in the following game as they fell to a Boxing Day home defeat to Preston North End; a sixth home defeat meaning they had already lost more home games than in the previous two seasons despite only having played eleven out of twenty-three home ties. Despite the defeat, Derby ended the year outside the relegation zone after a 4–0 win away to Birmingham City - Derby's biggest away win since a 4–0 win at the same opponents on 26th December 2014 - took them up to 20th and three points clear of relegation with a game in hand. Academy graduate Kaide Gordon's appearance as a substitute made him the fourth-youngster player in club history.

Derby's upturn in form was tempered by the news that Curtis Davies, who had been stretchered off in the 65th-minute in the draw at Brentford, had suffered an injury to his achilles tendon and would be out "long-term", with speculation that Davies, whose contract was due to expire at the end of the season, had played his last game for the club. Despite the injury to Davies leaving Derby short at centre-back, Rooney made it clear that the primary target for the upcoming January transfer window would be a striker, saying "The striker area we need to add to. Colin (Kazim-Richards) has come, and he's been great. If we can add one or two more in that position it would only benefit the team in the long run." One potential signing was Leeds United's Tyler Roberts, though Leeds informed Derby that any deal would require Leeds bringing someone in first.

Looking ahead to the January transfer window, it was also revealed that out of favour defender Mike te Wierik, who has not featured since October, had been told he was free to find another club and that Jayden Mitchell-Lawson would return from his loan spell at Bristol Rovers early after a managerial change left him out of the first team.

The proposed £60 million takeover by Khalifa bin Zayed Al Nahyan's Derventio Holdings, which had been ratified by the EFL the previous month, still remained uncompleted as of mid-December, resulting in doubts over the deal after it emerged Zayed Al Nahyan owed Newcastle United £500k in legal bills from previous takeover discussions. This led to the club, who had been silent on the takeover progress for six weeks, issuing a statement that discussions were on track, with the aim of a finish before Christmas which, ultimately, did not happen. The continued delay with the takeover had the knock-on effect of players wage payments being delayed leading into the new year.

For their performances during December, Nathan Byrne, Matt Clarke, Krystian Bielik and Colin Kazim-Richards were all names in the WhoScored.com Championship Team of the Month. Bielik was also nominated for Sky Bet Championship Player of the Month.

=== January ===
"Staff members and players were tested on Monday and have subsequently returned a number of positive results.The names of those individuals will not be made public for medical confidentiality reasons, but they and their close contacts must now serve a period of isolation at home in line with UK Government guidelines. In accordance with Derby County and EFL COVID-19 protocol, the club's Moor Farm training ground has been closed with immediate effect.In addition, the club is in dialogue with the EFL and Football Association in relation to upcoming fixtures.This decision has been taken to prevent the spread of the virus and protect club employees and their family members. Derby County would like to wish the individuals that have returned a positive COVID-19 test result a quick and safe return to full health."

— Derby County statement, 4 January 2020

Derby opened 2021 with a 1–0 defeat at Sheffield Wednesday which saw The Owls leapfrog Derby in the table, who dropped back into the bottom three, albeit with a game in hand on a number of the teams around them. In the days following the game, Derby closed their training ground, as did Sheffield Wednesday, after "several players" were found to have contracted COVID-19. Although there had been concerns that the outbreak would affect the FA Cup tie against Chorley, it was reported Derby would not have to forfeit the tie in the case that they could not fulfil the fixture, with each case to be assessed by the FA on its individual circumstances, though as FA Cup rules stated that clubs are expected to fulfil their fixtures as long as they have 14 eligible players, including the under-23 and under-18 squads, they would be expected to play. As a result, manager Wayne Rooney and the entirety of the first team squad would not travel for the game, and the team would be managed by Senior Professional Development Phase Coach Pat Lyons and Professional Development Phase Coach Gary Bowyer. Testing of the available players the day before the game ruled out a further six players leaving Lyons to admit that Derby were now "underdogs." Derby, for whom fourteen players made their debuts, fielded a team with an average age of 19 and lost 2–0 to exit at the third round stage for only the third time in ten years; it was the first time a sixth tier side had beaten a second-tier team since 1991. In the days following the Chorley game the whole of the first team squad tested negative for COVID-19 and were able to return to training. On 15 January, Wayne Rooney was appointed manager on a permanent basis, signing a two-and-a-half-year deal and officially announcing his retirement as a player. Liam Rosenior took up the role of assistant manager and Shay Given moved to first-team coach, with Jason Pearcey stepping up from Academy goalkeeping coach to replace Given as first-team goalkeeping coach. Steve McClaren also stayed on as technical director and advisor to the board of directors. Rooney's first game as permanent manager was a 1–0 home defeat to Rotherham United. The defeat, the first time Derby had failed to beat Rotherham in a home fixture since 1985 and Rotherham's first victory at Derby in 55 years, was described as "sloppy" by Rooney and continued an alarming record against the teams around Derby in the bottom eight positions of the table, with just one win in seven and six points from a possible 21. In contrast, a 1–0 home win over AFC Bournemouth in the next fixture continued their strong string of results against teams in the top six, with only one defeat in seven fixtures, and took Derby out of the relegation zone. The win was followed with more 1–0 victories, this time away to relegation rivals Q.P.R. and at home to play-off chasing Bristol City, as Derby achieved back-to-back wins for the first time in the 2020–21 season and pulled five points clear of the relegation zone, albeit having played two more games than Rotherham in 22nd.

With takeover talks with Derventio Holdings still in progress, it was revealed on 9 January that payment of December wages were outstanding, with some players being described as "frustrated". It was later revealed that 50 percent of player wages had already been paid and the rest was dependent on the completion of the takeover. In the week following the FA Cup defeat at Chorley, it was announced that the takeover was finally to be completed and the delayed wages to players and senior executives would be paid. Despite claims that the takeover was now "legally binding" this was, once again, not the case; with players wages remaining unpaid, it was reported that CEO Stephen Pearce had called the players and management together at the training ground to apologise for the ongoing problems, and promised to keep them informed of developments; some reports suggested Derby has alerted clubs to the availability of players such as Jason Knight and Louie Sibley as they needed to raise money quickly to avoid possible administration and a points deduction. The failure to pay player wages also resulted in a transfer embargo being placed on the club. With uncertainty brewing amongst the fanbase, CEO Stephen Pearce reassured the support that the takeover was "absolutely going ahead" and that any player sales would be within the range of their business model rather than in a fire sale. It was suggested that, rather than first team players, Derby would look to sell members of its academy in order to raise additional money. The continued delays in the takeover led to the club drawing up contingency plans to find funds from alternate sources. The players wages for December were fully paid on 25 January.

With the reopening of the transfer window and Derby looking to strengthen, Rooney reiterated his desire to improve the club's attacking options, as well as add a centre back, during the upcoming month. The press linked Derby with moves for Tom Ince, who had had a successful spell at the club between 2015 and 2017, SV Darmstadt striker Serdar Dursun, though the player would not qualify under the new points-based system agreed by the FA, Premier League and EFL in conjunction with the Home Office following the UK's exit from the European Union, Peterborough United's Siriki Dembele, former Blackpool forward Armand Gnanduillet, Doncaster Rovers Ben Whiteman, (who eventually joined Preston North End), AFC Wimbledon's Joe Piggott, and free-agents Ravel Morrison and Nathaniel Mendez-Laing. There were also links with loan deals for Leeds striker Tyler Roberts, Aston Villa's Keinan Davis,Cardiff City winger Josh Murphy, Sheffield United's Billy Sharp. and Rangers' George Edmundson. An apparent interest in Standard Liège's Montenegrin winger Aleksandar Boljević cooled when Derby, who initially believed the player was available on a free transfer, were informed he would cost £2 million.

In regards of outgoings, Isaac Hutchinson was the first departure of the window, as he moved on loan to League Two Forest Green Rovers for the rest of the season. Out-of-favour defender Mike te Wierik was the first permanent outgoing as he agreed a deal to return to FC Groningen; when discussing his time at Derby he said "It has not turned out what I had hoped for, it is that simple. In the beginning I didn't play well enough, but we didn't really play well as a team either." Duane Holmes, with whom the club had opened contract talks, but failed to agree terms was heavily linked with a £1m move to Huddersfield Town. after having displayed displeasure at being played out-wide rather than in his preferred position of down the middle. Holmes eventually joined Huddersfield on 25 January with the deal quoted as being predominantly incentive based. Manchester City were supposedly "angered" after an attempt to sign loanee Scott Carson was rebuffed by the club, due to them wanting the £500k loan free due them. A £500k bid from Millwall for George Evans was rejected by the club, before accepting a bid of £750k as Rooney told Evans he could not guarantee him game time. A £700k bid from Swansea City for Morgan Whittaker was also accepted.

A rumoured outgoing was Jason Knight, who was linked with moves to Premier League clubs Burnley, West Ham United and Crystal Palace; Leeds United were also linked with Knight, as well as Louie Sibley. However, Rooney was unequivocal in saying that Knight would not be leaving.Kaide Gordon, an academy product who made his first-team debut in the 4–0 win at Birmingham City, was linked with a move to Liverpool or Manchester United with Derby valuing Gordon at £2m having already turned down offers for him. Although not an imminent departure, Manchester City scout Jakub Bokiej revealed in an interview that he had Kamil Jóźwiak "high" on a list of players he monitored and believed Jóźwiak would be playing in the Premier League within 18-months.

In addition to transfers, the club also had to start considering whether or not to extend the contracts of a number of first-team players whose deals were coming to end. Whilst it was believed that Scott Carson, Florian Jozefzoon, Curtis Davies and Scott Malone would not be offered new deals, and, as previously stated, Duane Holmes had failed to agree terms, it was understood talks were expected to open with Martyn Waghorn and Andre Wisdom.

=== February ===
With the transfer window closing at 11pm on 1 February, the Rams conducted the majority of their transfer business in the final 24 hours. Manchester United defender Teden Mengi, Rangers defender George Edmundson, Everton midfielder Beni Baningime, Manchester City winger Patrick Roberts and Stoke City forward Lee Gregory all joined on loan deals until the end of the campaign. George Evans left the club for Millwall in a £750k deal and Morgan Whittaker joined Swansea City for £700k. The club's final business was to let Jahmal Hector-Ingram join Stevenage on loan until the end of the season.

Youngster Kaide Gordon left the club to join Liverpool a few days following the closure of the window, with Derby reported to be receiving a fee in the region of £1 million, rising to £3 million with add-ons. Derby also bought in Arsenal youngster Bayo Fapetu and handed trials to Chelsea youth Filip Lissah and former-West Ham youth Courtney Clarke, with an eye on integrating them into the club's under-18 setup, whilst Manchester United displayed an interest in an unnamed trio of Derby's U-18 players to the tune of a combined £750,000.

Roberts, Baningime and Gregory made their debuts as substitutes as Derby finally played their away fixture against Rotherham United at the third time of asking, following postponements firstly due to the COVID-19 and then a waterlogged pitch, but were on the wrong end of a 3–0 defeat which saw the gap between Derby and the relegation zone reduced to just two points, with Rotherham, in 22nd, having two games in hand. It was the first time Rotherham has completed a league double over the Rams since the 1965/66 season. The defeat was compounded by the fact that Krystian Bielik, who had suffered injury in the 1–0 win over Bristol City, would miss the remainder of the season due to an anterior cruciate ligament; the second time he has suffered the injury in his spell at the club. A second postponement of the month followed when 6 February trip to Barnsley was called off due to a waterlogged pitch and Derby dropped back into the bottom three on goal difference following a win for Rotherham on 6 February and then Sheffield Wednesday the following Tuesday. However, the following Saturday saw Rotherham and Sheffield Wednesday in the reverse position, as frozen pitches led to postponements of both club's home matches, allowing Derby to leapfrog both of them (as well as Coventry City) in the table after a 2–1 home win over Middlesbrough; Lee Gregory scoring one and creating the other on his home debut. Three days later Derby reached a season high of 16th in the table when Andre Wisdom scored his first career league goal in the 94th-minute to secure a 2–1 win away at bottom of the table Wycombe Wanderers in Derby's first every visit to Adams Park. A Friday night 2–1 defeat away to 3rd-placed Watford was followed by a 2–0 victory at home to fellow strugglers Huddersfield Town with George Edmundson's first goal for the club giving Derby the lead before Martyn Waghorn, who came on for Edmundson at half-time, became the first substitute of the season to score for the Rams to make the game safe in the second half.

Ahead of the second East Midlands Derby of the season, Wayne Rooney found himself under the spotlight as national media attention centered on arguably the highest profile match of his nascent management career. Having accrued 31 points from a possible 54 in his 18 days in sole charge, and taking the club from bottom of the table and six points from safety to 18th in the league and eight points clear of the relegation zone, and being feted by the press for "convincing the doubters" Rooney even found himself as 25/1 outsider for the Celtic job following the resignation of Neil Lennon. In the event of the match, Colin Kazim-Richards celebrated signing a one-year extension to his contract with an 84th-minute equalizer in a 1–1 draw (the third consecutive East Midlands Derby to end in that scoreline) as Derby gave what Rooney described as a mixed performance, saying "30-35 minutes we were excellent (but in the) second half we weren't good."

In mid-February, club-owner Mel Morris gave an interview discussing the situation surrounding the takeover of the club. He stated that the deal was "still live" as there was "a contractual obligation to sell and a contractual obligation to buy" though he couldn't talk about it due to "a very strict Non-disclosure agreement." He also revealed that his decision to sell the club came after a year of significant personal and health problems, some of which were related to the COVID-19 pandemic. An article in The Guardian commented that Derby County no longer owned their own stadium (land registry documents suggested it had been sold to "Rams Investment Limited" a company with links to the Swiss-Turkish businessman Henry Gabay, though the club denied this) and had taken two loans totalling over £30m-loan from MSD Holdings (one of which was secured against Moor Farm).

=== March ===
March began with three consecutive away games; a 4–0 defeat away to Cardiff City, the joint biggest defeat of the season, a 1–0 away loss at relegation rivals Coventry City and a 0–0 draw at in-form Barnsley, which ended the home side's seven-match winning streak. Two home games also failed to yield any wins - a 1–0 defeat to Millwall, a first home reverse in two months, was followed by a 2–2 draw with Brentford, which saw Derby come from 2–0 down at half time to claim a point thanks to Louie Sibley's 86th-minute equalizer, his first goal of the season. In the final game of the month, Derby lost 1–0 away to Stoke City, resulting in March yielding no wins, two points from a possible 18 and only two goals scored. Now winless in seven, Derby went into the international break only five points clear of relegation, with 22nd-placed Rotherham having four games in hand. When discussing recent form, Rooney admitted "We look at ourselves, that's all we can do... but obviously the run of form over the last few weeks has not been good enough. We know, if we did not know beforehand, we are in a relegation battle."

With the takeover dealings with Khalifa bin Zayed Al Nahyan entered into a fifth month and increasing cynicism over whether it would ever be completed, the deal was officially called off on 17 March 2021 after his company, Dervention Holdings, failed to come up with the necessary funds by a deadline set by Derby Chairman Mel Morris. It was revealed that Derby were in "advanced talks" with Spanish businessman Erik Alonso, as well an other, unnamed, investors - one of whom was described as a "dream suitor" by The Daily Telegraph's John Percy. The "broken promises" surrounding the collapse of the takeover was reported to have "soured" the relationship between Morris and Rooney, though Rooney strongly denied this.

With the departure of under-23s manager Gary Bowyer to League Two Salford City, former-defender Jake Buxton was linked with a return to the club to fill the position until the end of the season. There were also rumours that Nicky Butt, who has just quit his position as Head of First Team Development Coach at Manchester United, would be joining the club in an undisclosed position.

With the end of the season approaching, links with potential new signings for the upcoming 2021-22 season, with Luton Town forward James Collins amongst the first names mentioned.

=== April ===
Erik Alonso
(@Eralwbd)
tweeted:

The good times will return !@dcfcofficial

8 April 2021

Derby resumed the Championship campaign on Good Friday with a 2–0 home victory over Luton Town and a 3–1 defeat to play-off chasing Reading on Easter Monday which saw then end the Easter programme eight points clear of the relegation zone with six games remaining, though every team below them bar bottom-placed Wycombe Wanderers had games in hand. The squad was also beginning to pick up injuries; during the Luton victory Lee Gregory picked up a season-ending hamstring injury, whilst Martyn Waghorn (hamstring) and Matt Clarke (compacted groin) were both ruled out for a number of weeks. Following this, the Reading defeat saw Nathan Byrne suffer a concussion, ruling him out for seven days under EFL concussion rules, and Jack Stretton, fresh from a successful loan spell at Stockport County, went off with an ankle injury less than twenty minutes after coming on as substitute. Coupled with the long-term absences of Jordon Ibe, Krystian Bielik, George Edmundson and Curtis Davies this left Derby short of nine of their first team squad for the visit of league leaders Norwich City and 11/2 sixth favourites for relegation. Former-Derby loanee Kieran Dowell's 21st-minute free-kick was the difference as Norwich edged past The Rams 1–0 at Pride Park and saw Derby drop to 20th in the table and seven points clear of the relegation zone after Rotherham United gained a point on them following a 0–0 draw with Huddersfield Town. In the week prior to Derby's trip to Blackburn (which was rearranged to Friday 16 April from Saturday 17 April to avoid clashing with the funeral of Prince Philip) Rotherham played two of their four games in hand - a 3–1 victory over Queens Park Rangers and a 1–0 defeat to Coventry City- which reduced the gap between them and Derby to just four points, with Rotheram in 22nd on 39 points from 39 games and Derby in 21st with 43 points from 41 games. Despite the precarity of the situation, Rooney implored fans not to panic as he believed "100% in this group of players and... 100% we'll stay in this division." Despite Rooney's confidence, and taking the lead through Tom Lawrence's second goal of the season, Derby crashed to a 2–1 defeat at Blackburn (Blackburn's first home win since January) to remain in trouble; Rooney was particularly aggrieved at being denied an injury-time penalty, the failure to award of which he described as "unacceptable". Rotherham's 1–0 defeat at home to Birmingham City, which reduced their games in hand to two, and the news that Martyn Waghorn would be available for selection for the next match, against Preston North End, after recovering from a hamstring injury was tempered by the news loanee Teden Mengi would return to parent-club Manchester United due to a season-ending injury. A 3–0 loss at Preston, in which Andre Wisdom limped off in the 34th-minute with what proved to be a season-ending groin injury was Derby's fourth reversal on the trot and left them just four points clear of relegation whilst handing Rotherham a further game in hand with which to catch them (though Rotherham lost this, 2–1 at home to Middlesbrough), with Rooney stating "Do I believe we can win the last three games? Yes, but we have to rely on Rotherham losing games. It is out of our hands." Rooney's belief proved misguided as, despite taking the lead through Colin Kazim-Richards first goal in two months, Derby crashed to a fifth consecutive defeat in their next game, 2–1 at home to Birmingham City, ending a nine-match undefeated streak against Blues; this result meant that Derby ended the month having taken just three points from a possible eighteen. Luckily for Derby, all the other members of the bottom five, Wycombe, Sheffield Wednesday, Rotherham and Huddersfield, also fell to defeat, meaning that they remained four points clear of relegation. This cushion remained after Rotherham lost one of their two remaining games in hand 1–0 away to Brentford on 27 April; this result was significant as it meant that Derby would be guaranteed safety, regardless of the results of the teams around them, if they won their two remaining games against Swansea City and Sheffield Wednesday.

Away from on the field results, it was revealed that Derby were one of ten Championship clubs placed under a transfer embargo by the EFL for using the option of a three-month extension to file company accounts, with the embargo due to be lifted when the accounts were received by Companies House. Derby chose not to comment on the situation, though Dave Boddy, chief executive of one of the affected clubs, Coventry City, stated "It's ridiculous that the EFL's regulations on this do not replicate this approach that the government has taken, especially when they have amended other rules of theirs during the pandemic."

In regards of ownership of the club, it was suggested that potential American bidders were keen on the club, but were awaiting the results of the club's relegation battle. However, it was the previously mooted Erik Alonson who emerged as the front runner after an agreement between Alonso's No Limits Sport Limited and Derby owner Mel Morris was announced on 7 April with Alonso stating he had the ultimate target of getting Derby into the Champion's League. It was suggested, however, that Alonso was actually just a frontman rather than the main financial backer.

With the summer transfer window fast approaching, left-back Lee Buchanan, who had had a breakthrough campaign, was linked with a move to the Premier League with West Ham. Derby themselves were linked with a move for Cheltenham Town midfielder Felix Miles.

=== May ===
Derby entered May four points behind 20th-place Huddersfield Town and four points clear of 22nd-place Rotherham United and 23rd-place Sheffield Wednesday, with bottom of the table Wycombe Wanderers all-but-relegated baring an extremely unlikely set of results. Derby made the trip to a Swansea side who had guaranteed their place in the playoffs the previous week, with Swansea manager Steve Cooper suggesting that he may rotate the Swans squad, though Derby still faced a challenge due to the unavailability of Andre Wisdom, Beni Baningime, Teden Mengi, Jack Stretton, Krystian Bielik, Jordon Ibe, Lee Gregory and Curtis Davies. For the third time in four games, Derby lost despite taking the lead (2-1); it was the first time in 37 years they had lost six consecutive fixtures at second tier level. As Sheffield Wednesday had earned a point in a 0–0 draw with Nottingham Forest and Rotherham United scored a late equalizer to draw 1–1 with Blackburn Rovers, Derby found themselves relying on Rotherham not earning a maximum return from their two remaining games and they themselves getting a result in their final game, at home to Wednesday. Rotherham played their final game in hand, away to Luton Town, the following Wednesday and drew 0-0 leaving Derby two points clear of relegation with one game left to play.

Away from Derby's on-field battles, rumours emerged that the takeover by No Limits Sports Limited was in doubt as Erik Alonso was planning to refinance Pride Park to complete the purchase of the club leaving "alarm bells... ringing inside the club and... a realisation that the buyout is unlikely to go through"; Alonso, however, refuted this, saying "(I will put) the debt in my name, what I want to do it put stadium warranty under my name, that's all. Because I can use the money to buy players."

With an eye on the next season, Martyn Waghorn was linked with a move back to former-club Ipswich Town on the expiration of his contract and Derby were linked with a move with defender Shane Duffy.

==== Survival Saturday ====
With both automatic promotion spots (Norwich, Watford) and playoff places (Barnsley, Brentford, Bournemouth, Swansea) decided before the last round of fixtures, the media focused on the relegation battle at the foot of the Championship, which was dubbed "survival Saturday". Derby went into the match against Sheffield Wednesday knowing defeat would relegate them (as Wednesday would join them on 43 points but with a guaranteed superior goal-difference), victory would guarantee them survival and a draw would be enough as long as Rotherham United were unable to achieve a victory away to Cardiff City. Going into the final round of games, all five of the UK's major bookmakers had Derby as favourites to stay up, with Sheffield Wednesday second favourites and Rotherham third.

On the day itself, Rotherham took an 8th-minute lead at Cardiff through Lewis Wing which saw them leapfrog both Derby and Sheffield Wednesday early on. Colin Kazim-Richard had a goal disallowed for Derby before Sam Hutchinson scored in the fourth-minute of first half injury time to give Wednesday a 1–0 lead. Derby ended the first half 23rd in the league and level on points with Wycombe Wanderers (who were winning 2–0 at Middlesbrough) but with a superior goal-difference.

Due to an injury to Martyn Waghorn causing the first half to finish late, Derby kicked the second half off nine minutes behind Cardiff v Rotherham. Derby started the second half quickly and scored two goals in four minutes through Waghorn (49 mins) and Patrick Roberts first for the club (52 mins) seeing Derby leapfrog back out of the relegation zone for 10 minutes before Callum Paterson equalized on 62 minutes to see Derby drop back to 22nd, and things got even worse for the Rams when Julian Börner gave Sheffield Wednesday a 3–2 lead in the 69th minute.

With 15 minutes left to play at Derby, and 5 minutes remaining at Rotherham, Derby were 23rd in the table, with Wednesday also in the relegation zone (22nd) and Rotherham safe in 21st. However, in the space of ninety seconds Derby were awarded a penalty, Marlon Pack scored an 88th-minute equalizer for Cardiff against Rotherham to make the score 1-1, and then Martyn Waghorn converted Derby's penalty (79 mins) to make the score 3–3 at Pride Park. This meant that 21st place was held by all three sides battling the drop in the space of 90 seconds, with Wednesday safe for all of twenty seconds before Derby leapfrogged them.

With Rotherham finishing 1-1, Derby knew that holding on for the final 10 minutes would see them stay up, which they were successfully able to do and stayed up in 21st, one point ahead of Wycombe in 22nd, who won 3–0 at Middlesbrough.

=== Post-season ===
The day after the conclusion of the 2020-21 campaign, Derby issued a formal apology to supporters for the previous campaign, finishing by stating "We know that your dedication and love for the club is deserving of so much more and we will endeavour to restore your pride."

However, there was still a threat of potential relegation hanging over the club as there remained fears of a potential points deduction with rumours that an independent disciplinary appeal came down in favour of the EFL in the ongoing dispute over the club's amortisation policy after Derby has won the initial ruling in September 2020, with Wycombe Wanderers owner Rob Couhig ready to go to court over the matter. In a statement, the EFL said that Derby's "policy was not in accordance with accounting standard FRS102 because it failed to accurately reflect the manner in which the Club takes the benefit of player registrations over the lifetime of a player's contract." Derby stated they were disappointed by, but respected, the verdict. Derby were handed a fine of £100,000 over their accounting policies, though the EFL retained their right to appeal and were considering pushing for a retroactive points deduction, which would see the club relegated; the EFL stated they had prepared interchangeable fixture list for the following season for Derby and Wycombe. Wycombe owner Rob Couhig accused Derby of "systemic cheating" and stated his intention to sue Derby for "£10m-£15m of potential losses" should Wycombe be playing in League one in the coming campaign.

The Rams lost their second court case in 24-hours when it was announced that former-captain Richard Keogh, who had been sacked in 2019 following his involvement in a highly publicised drink-driving incident, had won a settlement against the club and would be paid £2.4m in wages owed to him as he was found to have not committed "gross misconduct".

As the inquisition into Derby's poor season started, one report by The Athletic suggested that former-boss Phillip Cocu, who had been highly impressed by the high pressing style played by Leeds United and Brentford in their victories at Pride Park toward the end of the previous season, had attempted to emulate the style at the club and had, as a result, ‘exhausted’ the players in pre-season.

With the Erik Alonso takeover going into a second month, numerous reports suggested that his "right hand man" Tajinder Sumal had quit No Limits Sports Ltd. Alonso deleted his Twitter account after being accused of reposting a property seen on TikTok to suggest it was his own house and being unable to provide proof of funds to the EFL, with many now seeing the takeover as being unlikely to proceed, with an unnamed American consortium the new favourites to assume ownership of the club, with more than one party interested in buying the club. It was suggested that, should the takeover be completed quickly and Morris no longer involved with the club, then any potential points deduction to the club would be reduced from "double figures".

Against this background of uncertainty, various Derby supporter's groups came together to publish an open letter to the club, asking for clarification on, amongst other things, the situation regarding any potential takeover, the possibility of supporter representation on the board, and the club's ability to satisfy any EFL criteria to remove the transfer embargo the club was running under. The club's official response stated that Mel Morris had been in discussions with "numerous parties", the deal with No Limits Sports Limited was dead, and that supporter representation would be considered. It also reiterated the desire to keep "supporters and stakeholders as informed as possible (though) this may not always be possible due to confidentiality obligations."

It was announced on 29 May that Graeme Shinnie had won the club's Player of the Season and Lee Buchanan the club's Young Player of the Season.

The club announced its retained list on 14 June 2021. Of the first-team Emmanuel Idem, Scott Carson, Scott Malone, Jonathan Mitchell and Florian Jozefzoon were all confirmed to be leaving the club, whereas Andre Wisdom, Martyn Waghorn, Jack Marriott, Curtis Davies and Henrich Ravas were in talks about new deals. The inclusion of Marriott, who it had been announced had signed a contract extension earlier in the season, was explained by the fact that the deal had had approval withdrawn by the EFL due to the ongoing appeal over amortisation.

== Players ==
=== Current squad ===
As of 8 May 2021

Note: Flags indicate national team as defined under FIFA eligibility rules; some limited exceptions apply. Players may hold more than one non-FIFA nationality.

No.	Pos.	Nation	Player
1	GK	SCO	David Marshall
2	DF	ENG	Andre Wisdom
3	DF	SCO	Craig Forsyth
4	MF	SCO	Graeme Shinnie
5	DF	POL	Krystian Bielik
7	FW	POL	Kamil Jóźwiak
8	MF	ENG	Max Bird
9	FW	ENG	Martyn Waghorn
10	MF	WAL	Tom Lawrence
11	FW	ENG	Jordon Ibe
12	DF	ENG	Nathan Byrne
13	FW	TUR	Colin Kazim-Richards
14	FW	ENG	Jack Marriott
17	MF	ENG	Louie Sibley
21	GK	NED	Kelle Roos
26	DF	ENG	Lee Buchanan
27	GK	SVK	Henrich Ravas
28	MF	ENG	Connor Dixon

No.	Pos.	Nation	Player
29	DF	IRL	Festy Ebosele
30	GK	ENG	Emmanuel Idem
31	DF	ENG	Joe Bateman
33	DF	ENG	Curtis Davies
35	FW	ENG	Cameron Cresswell
36	FW	ENG	Tyree Wilson
37	DF	ENG	Kornell McDonald
38	MF	IRL	Jason Knight
39	FW	SCO	Jack Stretton
40	MF	IRL	Louie Watson
42	MF	ENG	Jayden Mitchell-Lawson
43	MF	ENG	Liam Thompson
44	GK	ENG	Bradley Foster
45	MF	ENG	Josh Shonibare
46	MF	ENG	Jordan Brown
47	DF	ENG	Harrison Solomon
48	MF	IRL	Olamide Ibrahim
49	FW	ENG	Jahmal Hector-Ingram

== Transfers ==
=== Transfers in ===
Date	Pos.	Nationality	Name	From	Fee	Ref.
1 July 2020	DF	ENG	Marko Borkovic	Maidenhead United (ENG)	Undisclosed	
1 July 2020	CB	NED	Mike te Wierik	Groningen (NED)	Free transfer	
10 August 2020	FW	IRL	Cian Kelly	Bohemian (IRL)	Undisclosed	
16 August 2020	MF	NGA	Olamide Ibrahim	Manchester United (ENG)	Free transfer	
21 August 2020	GK	SCO	David Marshall	Wigan Athletic (ENG)	Free transfer	
28 August 2020	GK	ENG	Emmanuel Idem	Canvey Island (ENG)	Free transfer	
10 September 2020	RB	ENG	Nathan Byrne	Wigan Athletic (ENG)	Undisclosed	
16 September 2020	LW	POL	Kamil Jóźwiak	Lech Poznań (POL)	Undisclosed	
22 September 2020	RW	ENG	Jordon Ibe	Bournemouth (ENG)	Free transfer	
25 September 2020	ST	ENG	Bobby Duncan	Fiorentina (ITA)	Undisclosed	
2 October 2020	LW	ENG	Isaac Hutchinson	Southend United (ENG)	Undisclosed	
15 October 2020	FW	TUR	Colin Kazim-Richards	Free agent	Free transfer	
15 October 2020	GK	ENG	George Sykes-Kenworthy	Free agent	Free transfer	
15 October 2020	MF	IRL	Louie Watson	West Ham United (ENG)	Free transfer	
28 February 2021	MF	NGA	Bayo Fapetu	Arsenal (ENG)	Free transfer	
19 March 2021	ST	ENG	Luke Plange	Arsenal (ENG)	Free transfer	
25 March 2021	ST	ENG	Reece Nicholas-Davies	Fulham (ENG)	Free transfer	

=== Loans in ===
Date from	Pos.	Nationality	Name	From	Date until	Ref.
26 August 2020	CB	ENG	Matthew Clarke	Brighton & Hove Albion (ENG)	End of season	
1 February 2021	CF	ENG	Lee Gregory	Stoke City (ENG)	End of season	
1 February 2021	CB	ENG	Teden Mengi	Manchester United (ENG)	19 April 2021	
1 February 2021	CB	ENG	George Edmundson	Rangers (SCO)	End of season	
1 February 2021	MF	DRC	Beni Baningime	Everton (ENG)	End of season	
1 February 2021	FW	ENG	Patrick Roberts	Manchester City (ENG)	End of season	

=== Loans out ===
Date from	Pos.	Nationality	Name	To	Date until	Ref.
4 August 2020	GK	ENG	Jonathan Mitchell	Northampton Town (ENG)	End of season	
8 August 2020	AM	ENG	Jayden Mitchell-Lawson	Bristol Rovers (ENG)	1 January 2021	
19 August 2020	GK	ENG	Scott Carson	Manchester City (ENG)	End of season	
28 August 2020	LB	ENG	Scott Malone	Millwall (ENG)	End of season	
1 October 2020	GK	SVK	Henrich Ravas	Hartlepool United (ENG)	End of season	
15 October 2020	RW	NED	Florian Jozefzoon	Rotherham United (ENG)	End of season	
16 October 2020	CF	ENG	Jack Marriott	Sheffield Wednesday (ENG)	End of season	
11 January 2021	LW	ENG	Isaac Hutchinson	Forest Green Rovers (ENG)	End of season	
1 February 2021	CF	ENG	Jahmal Hector-Ingram	Stevenage (ENG)	End of season	
4 March 2021	GK	IRL	Harry Halwax	Cabinteely (IRL)	End of season	
8 March 2021	CF	SCO	Jack Stretton	Stockport County (ENG)	5 April 2021	

=== Transfers out ===
Date	Pos.	Nationality	Name	To	Fee	Ref.
1 July 2020	LM	SCO	Ikechi Anya	Unattached	Released	
1 July 2020	DM	ENG	Tom Huddlestone	Unattached	Released	
31 July 2020	CF	SCO	Chris Martin	Bristol City (ENG)	Released	
3 August 2020	AM	WAL	Alex Babos	Alfreton Town (ENG)	Released	
3 August 2020	GK	ENG	Joshua Barnes	Stockport County (ENG)	Released	
3 August 2020	LB	IRL	Jaden Charles	Unattached	Released	
3 August 2020	FW	FRA	Yohan Greco	Unattached	Released	
3 August 2020	LB	ENG	Ethan Sephton	Alvechurch (ENG)	Released	
3 August 2020	CF	ENG	Javaun Splatt	Tonbridge Angels (ENG)	Released	
12 August 2020	MF	ENG	Filimon Asfha	Sheffield Wednesday (ENG)	Free transfer	
28 August 2020	SS	ENG	Mason Bennett	Millwall (ENG)	Undisclosed	
7 September 2020	RB	ENG	Jayden Bogle	Sheffield United (ENG)	Undisclosed	
7 September 2020	LB	ENG	Max Lowe	Sheffield United (ENG)	Undisclosed	
7 September 2020	CB	NED	Mike te Wierik	Groningen (NED)	Undisclosed	
15 January 2021	FW	ENG	Wayne Rooney	Retired		
25 January 2021	MF	USA	Duane Holmes	Huddersfield Town (ENG)	Undisclosed	
1 February 2021	DM	ENG	George Evans	Millwall (ENG)	£750k	
1 February 2021	FW	ENG	Morgan Whittaker	Swansea City (WAL)	£700k	
5 February 2021	RW	ENG	Kaide Gordon	Liverpool (ENG)	Undisclosed	

== Pre-season and friendlies ==
Win Draw Loss Fixtures

19 August 2020 Friendly	Peterborough United	1–2	Derby County	Burton upon Trent
17:00 BST	Dembélé 2'	Report	Sibley 16'; Ebosele 49'	Stadium: St. George's Park; Attendance: 0 Referee: N/A

22 August 2020 Friendly	Derby County	0–0	Doncaster Rovers	Derby
15:00 BST				Stadium: Moor Farm; Attendance: 0 Referee: N/A

26 August 2020 Friendly	Brentford	3–0	Derby County	Burton upon Trent
11:30 BST	Forss 36'; Nørgaard 73'; Jensen 89'	Report		Stadium: St George's Park National Football Centre; Attendance: 0 Referee: N/A

1 September 2020 Friendly	Derby County	0–2	Sheffield United	Derby
17:00 BST		Report	Osborn 38'; Sharp 73'	Stadium: Pride Park Stadium; Attendance: 0 Referee: N/A

== Competitions ==
=== Overview ===
Competition	First match	Last match	Starting round	Final position	Record							
Competition	First match	Last match	Starting round	Final position	Pld	W	D	L	GF	GA	GD	Win %
EFL Championship	12 September 2020	8 May 2021	Matchday 1	21st	46	11	11	24	36	58	−22	23.91
FA Cup	9 January 2021	9 January 2021	Third round	Third round	1	0	0	1	0	2	−2	0.00
EFL Cup	5 September 2020	15 September 2020	First round	Second round	2	0	1	1	1	2	−1	0.00
Total					49	11	12	26	37	62	−25	22.45

Last updated: 1 May 2021
Source: Competitions

=== EFL Championship ===
==== League table ====
Pos	Team	Pld	W	D	L	GF	GA	GD	Pts	Promotion, qualification or relegation
18	Birmingham City	46	13	13	20	37	61	−24	52	
19	Bristol City	46	15	6	25	46	68	−22	51	
20	Huddersfield Town	46	12	13	21	50	71	−21	49	
21	Derby County	46	11	11	24	36	58	−22	44	
22	Wycombe Wanderers (R)	46	11	10	25	39	69	−30	43	Relegation to EFL League One
23	Rotherham United (R)	46	11	9	26	44	60	−16	42	Relegation to EFL League One
24	Sheffield Wednesday (R)	46	12	11	23	40	61	−21	41 (Note: Sheffield Wednesday received a 12 point deduction for breaching the League's Profitability and Sustainability Rules. This was later reduced to 6 points by an Independent League Arbitration panel.)	Relegation to EFL League One

Source: EFL Official Website
Rules for classification: 1) Points; 2) Goal difference; 3) Number of goals scored; 4) Head-to-head results; 5) Wins; 6) Away goals; 7) Penalty points (sec 9.5); 8) 12-point sending off offences
(R) Relegated

==== Results summary ====
Overall								Home						Away					
Pld	W	D	L	GF	GA	GD	Pts	W	D	L	GF	GA	GD	W	D	L	GF	GA	GD
46	11	11	24	36	58	−22	44	6	7	10	20	26	−6	5	4	14	16	32	−16

Last updated: 8 May 2021.

==== Results by matchday ====
Matchday	1	2	3	4	5	6	7	8	9	10	11	12	13	14	15	16	17	18	19	20	21	22	23	24	25	26	27	28	29	30	31	32	33	34	35	36	37	38	39	40	41	42	43	44	45	46
Ground	H	A	H	A	H	A	A	H	A	H	H	A	A	H	H	A	A	H	H	H	A	A	H	H	A	H	A	H	A	A	H	H	A	A	A	H	H	A	H	A	H	A	A	H	A	H
Result	L	L	L	W	L	L	D	D	D	L	L	L	L	D	D	W	D	D	W	L	W	L	L	W	W	W	L	W	W	L	W	D	L	L	D	L	D	L	W	L	L	L	L	L	L	D
Position	22	19	22	20	21	22	22	21	22	23	24	24	24	24	24	23	22	22	22	22	20	22	23	21	21	18	19	19	17	19	18	18	18	19	18	19	19	19	19	18	20	21	21	21	21	21

Updated to match(es) played on 8 May 2021. Source:
A = Away; H = Home; W = Win; D = Draw; L = Loss

==== Matches ====
The 2020–21 season fixtures were released on 21 August.

12 September 2020 1	Derby County	0–2	Reading	Derby
15:00 BST		Report	João 40'; Ejaria 45+1'	Stadium: Pride Park; Attendance: 0 Referee: Darren Bond
Note: Match played behind closed doors due to the COVID-19 pandemic in the United Kingdom.

19 September 2020 2	Luton Town	2–1	Derby County	Luton
15:00 BST	Berry 34'; Clark 87'	Report	Marriott 52'	Stadium: Kenilworth Road; Attendance: 0 Referee: Dean Whitestone
Note: Match played behind closed doors due to the COVID-19 pandemic in the United Kingdom.

26 September 2020 3	Derby County	0–4	Blackburn Rovers	Derby
15:00 BST		Report	Dolan 11'; Johnson 12', 15'; Armstrong 77'	Stadium: Pride Park Stadium; Referee: Andy Woolmer
Note: Match played behind closed doors due to the COVID-19 pandemic in the United Kingdom.

3 October 2020 4	Norwich City	0–1	Derby County	Norwich
12:30 BST		Report	Rooney 87'	Stadium: Carrow Road; Attendance: 0 Referee: Stuart Attwell
Note: Live on Sky Sports. Match played behind closed doors due to the COVID-19 pandemic in the United Kingdom.

16 October 2020 5	Derby County	0–1	Watford	Derby
19:45 BST		Report	Pedro 76'	Stadium: Pride Park Stadium; Attendance: 0 Referee: Geoff Eltringham
Note: Live on Sky Sports. Match played behind closed doors due to the COVID-19 pandemic in the United Kingdom.

20 October 2020 6	Huddersfield Town	1–0	Derby County	Huddersfield
19:45 BST	Bacuna 53'	Report		Stadium: Kirklees Stadium; Attendance: 0 Referee: David Webb
Note: Match played behind closed doors due to the COVID-19 pandemic in the United Kingdom.

23 October 2020 7	Nottingham Forest	1–1	Derby County	West Bridgford
19:45 BST	Taylor 64'	Report	Waghorn 30'	Stadium: City Ground; Attendance: 0 Referee: Tony Harrington
Note: Match played behind closed doors due to the COVID-19 pandemic in the United Kingdom.

28 October 2020 8	Derby County	1–1	Cardiff City	Derby
19:45 GMT	Waghorn 24'	Report	Moore 77'	Stadium: Pride Park Stadium; Attendance: 0 Referee: Oliver Langford
Note: Match played behind closed doors due to the COVID-19 pandemic in the United Kingdom.

31 October 2020 9	Bournemouth	1–1	Derby County	Boscombe
15:00 GMT	Riquelme 81'	Report	Shinnie 13'	Stadium: Dean Court; Attendance: 0 Referee: Robert Jones
Note: Match played behind closed doors due to the COVID-19 pandemic in the United Kingdom.

4 November 2020 10	Derby County	0–1	Queens Park Rangers	Derby
19:45 GMT		Report	Bonne 88'	Stadium: Pride Park Stadium; Attendance: 0 Referee: Gavin Ward
Note: Match played behind closed doors due to the COVID-19 pandemic in the United Kingdom.

7 November 2020 11	Derby County	0–2	Barnsley	Derby
15:00 GMT		Report	Chaplin 30'; Adeboyejo 83'	Stadium: Pride Park Stadium; Attendance: 0 Referee: Leigh Doughty
Note: Match played behind closed doors due to the COVID-19 pandemic in the United Kingdom.

21 November 2020 12	Bristol City	1–0	Derby County	Bristol
15:00 GMT	Diedhiou 68'	Report		Stadium: Ashton Gate; Attendance: 0 Referee: Keith Stroud
Note: Match played behind closed doors due to the COVID-19 pandemic in the United Kingdom.

25 November 2020 13	Middlesbrough	3–0	Derby County	Middlesbrough
19:00 GMT	Assombalonga 33'; Clarke 71' (o.g.); Johnson 83'	Report		Stadium: Riverside Stadium; Attendance: 0 Referee: Peter Bankes
Note: Match played behind closed doors due to the COVID-19 pandemic in the United Kingdom.

28 November 2020 14	Derby County	1–1	Wycombe Wanderers	Derby
15:00 GMT	Holmes 36'	Report	Bloomfield 81'	Stadium: Pride Park Stadium; Attendance: 0 Referee: Oliver Langford
Note: Match played behind closed doors due to the COVID-19 pandemic in the United Kingdom.

1 December 2020 15	Derby County	1–1	Coventry City	Derby
19:45 GMT	Kazim-Richards 83'	Report	Hamer 90+1'	Stadium: Pride Park Stadium; Attendance: 0 Referee: Dean Whitestone
Note: Match played behind closed doors due to the COVID-19 pandemic in the United Kingdom.

5 December 2020 16	Millwall	0–1	Derby County	Bermondsey
15:00 GMT		Report	Knight 69'	Stadium: The Den; Attendance: 2,000; Referee: Darren England
Note: Played under COVID-19 Tier 2 restrictions.

9 December 2020 17	Brentford	0–0	Derby County	Brentford
19:45 GMT		Report		Stadium: Brentford Community Stadium; Attendance: 2,000; Referee: David Webb
Note: Played under COVID-19 Tier 2 restrictions.

12 December 2020 18	Derby County	0–0	Stoke City	Derby
15:00 GMT		Report		Stadium: Pride Park Stadium; Attendance: 0 Referee: Andy Woolmer
Note: Match played behind closed doors due to the COVID-19 pandemic in the United Kingdom.

16 December 2020 19	Derby County	2–0	Swansea City	Derby
17:30 GMT	Kazim-Richards 4'; Jóźwiak 37'			Stadium: Pride Park Stadium; Attendance: 0
Note: Match played behind closed doors due to the COVID-19 pandemic in the United Kingdom.

19 December 2020	Rotherham United	P–P	Derby County	Rotherham
15:00 GMT		Report		Stadium: New York Stadium; Attendance: 0 Referee: Jeremy Simpson
Note: Match postponed due to a COVID-19 outbreak amongst Rotherham United's playing squad.

26 December 2020 20	Derby County	0–1	Preston North End	Derby
15:00 GMT	Waghorn (red card) 20'	Report	Browne 90+6'	Stadium: Pride Park Stadium; Attendance: 0 Referee: Darren Bond
Note: Match played behind closed doors due to the COVID-19 pandemic in the United Kingdom.

29 December 2020 21	Birmingham City	0–4	Derby County	Bordesley
17:30 GMT		Report	Bielik 15'; Shinnie 17' (pen.); Kazim-Richards 26'; Knight 77'	Stadium: St Andrew's; Attendance: 0 Referee: Tony Harrington
Note: Live on Sky Sports. Match played behind closed doors due to the COVID-19 pandemic in the United Kingdom.

1 January 2021 22	Sheffield Wednesday	1–0	Derby County	Owlerton
17:30 GMT	Paterson 61'	Report		Stadium: Hillsborough Stadium; Attendance: 0 Referee: Matt Donohue
Note: Live on Sky Sports. Match played behind closed doors due to the COVID-19 pandemic in the United Kingdom.

16 January 2021 23	Derby County	0–1	Rotherham United	Derby
15:00 GMT		Report	Lindsay 86'	Stadium: Pride Park Stadium; Attendance: 0 Referee: James Linington
Note: Match played behind closed doors due to the COVID-19 pandemic in the United Kingdom.

19 January 2021 24	Derby County	1–0	Bournemouth	Derby
18:00 GMT	Bielik 32'	Report		Stadium: Pride Park Stadium; Attendance: 0 Referee: Oliver Langford
Note: Match played behind closed doors due to the COVID-19 pandemic in the United Kingdom. Live on Sky Sports.

23 January 2021 25	Queens Park Rangers	0–1	Derby County	White City
15:00 GMT		Report	Kazim-Richards 56'	Stadium: Kiyan Prince Foundation Stadium; Attendance: 0 Referee: Tim Robinson
Note: Match played behind closed doors due to the COVID-19 pandemic in the United Kingdom.

30 January 2021 26	Derby County	1–0	Bristol City	Derby
15:00 GMT	Kazim-Richards 4'	Report		Stadium: Pride Park Stadium; Attendance: 0 Referee: Darren England
Note: Match played behind closed doors due to the COVID-19 pandemic in the United Kingdom.

2 February 2021	Rotherham United	P–P	Derby County	Rotherham
19:00 GMT		Report		Stadium: New York Stadium; Attendance: 0 Referee: Jeremy Simpson
Note: Match postponed due to waterlogged pitch.

3 February 2021 27	Rotherham United	3–0	Derby County	Rotherham
19:00 GMT	Ihiekwe 76'; Smith 81'; Giles 88'	Report		Stadium: New York Stadium; Attendance: 0 Referee: Jeremy Simpson
Note: Match played behind closed doors due to the COVID-19 pandemic in the United Kingdom.

6 February 2021	Barnsley	P–P	Derby County	Barnsley
15:00 GMT		Report		Stadium: Oakwell; Attendance: 0
Note: Match postponed due to waterlogged pitch.

13 February 2021 28	Derby County	2–1	Middlesbrough	Derby
15:00 GMT	Gregory 15'; Kazim-Richards 32'	Report	Kebano 38'	Stadium: Pride Park Stadium; Attendance: 0 Referee: Matt Donohue
Note: Match played behind closed doors due to the COVID-19 pandemic in the United Kingdom.

16 February 2021 29	Wycombe Wanderers	1–2	Derby County	High Wycombe
15:00 GMT	Ikpeazu 48' (pen.)	Report	Ikpeazu 16' (o.g.); Wisdom 90+4'	Stadium: Adams Park; Attendance: 0 Referee: Kevin Friend
Note: Match played behind closed doors due to the COVID-19 pandemic in the United Kingdom.

19 February 2021 30	Watford	2–1	Derby County	Watford
19:45 GMT	João Pedro 19'; Hughes 21'	Report	Troost-Ekong 77' (o.g.)	Stadium: Vicarage Road; Attendance: 0 Referee: Tim Robinson
Note: Match played behind closed doors due to the COVID-19 pandemic in the United Kingdom. Live on Sky Sports.

23 February 2021 31	Derby County	2–0	Huddersfield Town	Derby
19:00 GMT	Edmundson 22'; Waghorn 66'	Report	Brown (red card) 88'	Stadium: Pride Park Stadium; Attendance: 0
Note: Match played behind closed doors due to the COVID-19 pandemic in the United Kingdom.

26 February 2021 32	Derby County	1–1	Nottingham Forest	Derby
19:45 GMT	Kazim-Richards 84'	Report	Garner 33'	Stadium: Pride Park Stadium; Attendance: 0 Referee: Oliver Langford
Note: Match played behind closed doors due to the COVID-19 pandemic in the United Kingdom. Live on Sky Sports.

2 March 2021 33	Cardiff City	4–0	Derby County	Cardiff
19:45 GMT	Bacuna 22', 56'; Moore 48'; Vaulks 90+3'	Report		Stadium: Cardiff City Stadium; Attendance: 0 Referee: Dean Whitestone
Note: Match played behind closed doors due to the COVID-19 pandemic in the United Kingdom.

6 March 2021 34	Coventry City	1–0	Derby County	Bordesley
15:00 GMT	Biamou 11'	Report		Stadium: St Andrew's; Attendance: 0 Referee: John Brooks
Note: Match played behind closed doors due to the COVID-19 pandemic in the United Kingdom.

10 March 2021 35	Barnsley	0–0	Derby County	Barnsley
19:45 GMT		Report		Stadium: Oakwell; Attendance: 0 Referee: Keith Stroud
Note: Match played behind closed doors due to the COVID-19 pandemic in the United Kingdom.

13 March 2021 36	Derby County	0–1	Millwall	Derby
15:00 GMT		Report	Hutchinson 45'	Stadium: Pride Park Stadium; Attendance: 0 Referee: Darren England
Note: Match played behind closed doors due to the COVID-19 pandemic in the United Kingdom.

16 March 2021 37	Derby County	2–2	Brentford	Derby
19:00 GMT	Gregory 47'; Sibley 86'	Report	Toney 8' (pen.); Canós 23'	Stadium: Pride Park Stadium; Attendance: 0 Referee: David Webb
Note: Match played behind closed doors due to the COVID-19 pandemic in the United Kingdom.

20 March 2021 38	Stoke City	1–0	Derby County	Stoke-on-Trent
19:45 GMT	Brown 74'	Report		Stadium: Bet365 Stadium; Attendance: 0 Referee: Jarred Gillett
Note: Match played behind closed doors due to the COVID-19 pandemic in the United Kingdom.

2 April 2021 39	Derby County	2–0	Luton Town	Derby
15:00 BST	Gregory 7'; Shinnie 49' (pen.)	Report		Stadium: Pride Park Stadium; Attendance: 0 Referee: Andy Woolmer
Note: Match played behind closed doors due to the COVID-19 pandemic in the United Kingdom.

5 April 2021 40	Reading	3–1	Derby County	Reading
15:00 BST	Olise 45+2'; Pușcaș 57'; João 84'	Report	Lawrence 79'	Stadium: Madejski Stadium; Attendance: 0 Referee: Jonathan Moss
Note: Match played behind closed doors due to the COVID-19 pandemic in the United Kingdom.

10 April 2021 41	Derby County	0–1	Norwich City	Derby
15:00 BST		Report	Dowell 21'	Stadium: Pride Park Stadium; Attendance: 0 Referee: Michael Salisbury
Note: Match played behind closed doors due to the COVID-19 pandemic in the United Kingdom.

16 April 2021 42	Blackburn Rovers	2–1	Derby County	Blackburn
18:00 BST	Gallagher 42'; Elliott 66'	Report	Lawrence 22'	Stadium: Ewood Park; Attendance: 0 Referee: Steve Martin
Note: Match played behind closed doors due to the COVID-19 pandemic in the United Kingdom.

20 April 2021 43	Preston North End	3–0	Derby County	Preston
19:45 BST	Whiteman 18'; Evans 73'; Ledson 87'	Report		Stadium: Deepdale; Attendance: 0 Referee: Geoff Eltringham
Note: Match played behind closed doors due to the COVID-19 pandemic in the United Kingdom.

24 April 2021 44	Derby County	1–2	Birmingham City	Derby
15:00 BST	Kazim-Richards 36'	Report	Jutkiewicz 62', 84'	Stadium: Pride Park Stadium; Attendance: 0 Referee: Robert Jones
Note: Match played behind closed doors due to the COVID-19 pandemic in the United Kingdom. Live on Sky Sports.

1 May 2021 45	Swansea City	2–1	Derby County	Swansea
15:00 BST	Whittaker 63'; Roberts 66'	Report	Lawrence 63'	Stadium: Liberty Stadium; Attendance: 0 Referee: Darren Bond
Note: Match played behind closed doors due to the COVID-19 pandemic in the United Kingdom. Live on Sky Sports.

8 May 2021 46	Derby County	3–3	Sheffield Wednesday	Derby
12:30 BST	Waghorn 49', 78' (pen.); Roberts 52'	Report	Hutchinson 45+4'; Paterson 62'; Börner 69'	Stadium: Pride Park Stadium; Attendance: 0 Referee: Mike Dean
Note: Match played behind closed doors due to the COVID-19 pandemic in the United Kingdom. Live on Sky Sports.

=== FA Cup ===
The draw for the third round proper of the FA Cup was made on 30 November 2020, live on BBC Sport, by Robbie Savage. Derby were handed a potential banana-skin tie, as they were drawn away to Chorley of the National League North (sixth tier), the lowest ranked side they had played in club history. After a COVID-19 outbreak at Derby's training ground the Monday prior to the game, it was announced that Derby's first-team players and management would have to miss the game due to going into self-isolation, with the fixture instead being fulfilled by players and staff from the club's under-18 and under-23 sides. Testing of the available players the day before the game ruled out a further four players. In the event of a 2–0 defeat, development coach Pat Lyons said "We're disappointed not to get the result and the fairytale we wanted."

9 January 2021 Third round	Chorley	2–0	Derby County	Chorley
12:15 GMT	Hall 10'; Calveley 84'	Report		Stadium: Victoria Park; Attendance: 0 Referee: Kevin Friend
Note: Match played behind closed doors due to the COVID-19 pandemic in the United Kingdom. Live on BT Sport.

=== EFL Cup ===
The first round draw was made on 18 August, live on Sky Sports, by Paul Merson. Derby drew League Two side Barrow, whom they had not played competitively since 1957, at home; Merson described the match as "one of the ties of the round". Derby progressed on penalties to reach the second round, which was drawn at the same time as the third round, on 6 September, live on Sky Sports by Phil Babb. Derby were handed two more potential home ties, as they were first drawn against fellow-Championship side Preston, with a potential third-round tie against the winners of the tie between Premier League Brighton & Hove Albion and EFL League One Portsmouth. In the event of the Preston game, however, Derby let slip a one-goal lead to lose 2–1 and exit the competition at the second round stage for the second time in three seasons.

5 September 2020 First round	Derby County	0–0 (3–2 p)	Barrow	Derby
12:00 BST		Report		Stadium: Pride Park Stadium; Attendance: 0 Referee: Ollie Yates
	Penalties
	Evans (penalty scored); Marriott (penalty missed); Bird (penalty missed); Shinnie (penalty scored); Whittaker (penalty scored)		Angus (penalty scored); Beadling (penalty missed); Hardcastle (penalty missed); Biggins (penalty scored); Hindle (penalty missed)

15 September 2020 Second round	Derby County	1–2	Preston North End	Derby
18:30 BST	Knight 51' te Wierik (red card) 55'	Report	Barkhuizen 79'; Johnson 90+2' (pen.)	Stadium: Pride Park Stadium; Attendance: 0 Referee: Andy Davies

== Statistics ==
=== Appearances and goals ===
As of 8 May 2020

No.	Pos	Nat	Player	Total		Championship		FA Cup		League Cup	
No.	Pos	Nat	Player	Apps	Goals	Apps	Goals	Apps	Goals	Apps	Goals
Goalkeepers
1	GK	(Scotland) SCO	David Marshall	33	0	33	0	0	0	0	0
21	GK	(Netherlands) NED	Kelle Roos	16	0	13+1	0	0	0	2	0
—	GK	(England) ENG	Matt Yates	1	0	0	0	1	0	0	0
Defenders
2	DF	(England) ENG	Andre Wisdom	40	1	36+2	1	0	0	1+1	0
3	DF	(Scotland) SCO	Craig Forsyth	21	0	19+1	0	0	0	1	0
6	DF	(Netherlands) NED	Mike te Wierik	6	0	3+1	0	0	0	2	0
6	DF	(England) ENG	George Edmundson	10	1	8+2	1	0	0	0	0
12	DF	(England) ENG	Nathan Byrne	41	0	39+2	0	0	0	0	0
15	DF	(England) ENG	Teden Mengi	9	0	7+2	0	0	0	0	0
16	DF	(England) ENG	Matthew Clarke	44	0	42	0	0	0	2	0
26	DF	(England) ENG	Lee Buchanan	37	0	28+7	0	0	0	2	0
29	DF	(Republic of Ireland) IRL	Festy Ebosele	4	0	0+3	0	0+1	0	0	0
33	DF	(England) ENG	Curtis Davies	14	0	11+2	0	0	0	0+1	0
37	DF	(England) ENG	Kornell McDonald	7	0	1+6	0	0	0	0	0
—	DF	(Republic of Ireland) IRL	Max Bardell	1	0	0	0	1	0	0	0
—	DF	(England) ENG	Joe Bateman	1	0	0	0	1	0	0	0
—	DF	(England) ENG	Hugo Jinkinson	1	0	0	0	1	0	0	0
—	DF	(England) ENG	Harrison Solomon	1	0	0	0	1	0	0	0
—	DF	(England) ENG	Dylan Williams	1	0	0	0	1	0	0	0
Midfielders
4	MF	(Scotland) SCO	Graeme Shinnie	43	3	41	3	0	0	1+1	0
5	MF	(Poland) POL	Krystian Bielik	13	2	13	2	0	0	0	0
8	MF	(England) ENG	Max Bird	34	0	21+12	0	0	0	1	0
17	MF	(England) ENG	Louie Sibley	31	1	10+19	1	0	0	2	0
22	MF	(England) ENG	George Evans	8	0	5+1	0	0	0	2	0
23	MF	(United States) USA	Duane Holmes	15	1	7+7	1	0	0	1	0
32	MF	(England) ENG	Wayne Rooney	11	1	9+1	1	0	0	1	0
34	MF	(Democratic Republic of the Congo) COD	Beni Baningime	2	0	1+1	0	0	0	0	0
38	MF	(Republic of Ireland) IRL	Jason Knight	45	3	41+2	2	0	0	2	1
40	MF	(Republic of Ireland) IRL	Louie Watson	8	0	1+7	0	0	0	0	0
41	MF	(England) ENG	Kaide Gordon	1	0	0+1	0	0	0	0	0
42	MF	(England) ENG	Jayden Mitchell-Lawson	1	0	0+1	0	0	0	0	0
43	MF	(England) ENG	Liam Thompson	1	0	0	0	1	0	0	0
46	MF	(England) ENG	Jordan Brown	1	0	0	0	0	0	0+1	0
48	MF	(Republic of Ireland) IRL	Olamide Ibrahim	1	0	0	0	0+1	0	0	0
—	MF	(Germany) GER	Osazee Aghatise	1	0	0	0	1	0	0	0
—	MF	(England) ENG	Isaac Hutchinson	1	0	0	0	1	0	0	0
Forwards
7	FW	(Poland) POL	Kamil Jóźwiak	40	1	30+10	1	0	0	0	0
9	FW	(England) ENG	Martyn Waghorn	32	5	21+11	5	0	0	0	0
10	FW	(Wales) WAL	Tom Lawrence	23	3	19+4	3	0	0	0	0
11	FW	(England) ENG	Jordon Ibe	1	0	0+1	0	0	0	0	0
13	FW	(Turkey) TUR	Colin Kazim-Richards	38	8	30+8	8	0	0	0	0
14	FW	(England) ENG	Jack Marriott	6	1	3+1	1	0	0	1+1	0
18	FW	(England) ENG	Morgan Whittaker	11	0	1+8	0	0	0	1+1	0
19	FW	(England) ENG	Lee Gregory	11	3	6+5	3	0	0	0	0
23	FW	(England) ENG	Patrick Roberts	14	1	7+7	1	0	0	0	0
35	FW	(England) ENG	Cameron Cresswell	2	0	0+1	0	1	0	0	0
39	FW	(England) ENG	Jack Stretton	4	0	0+4	0	0	0	0	0
49	FW	(England) ENG	Jahmal Hector-Ingram	7	0	0+7	0	0	0	0	0
—	FW	(Poland) POL	Bartosz Cybulski	1	0	0	0	0+1	0	0	0
—	FW	(England) ENG	Bobby Duncan	1	0	0	0	1	0	0	0

=== Goal scorers ===
As of 8 May 2021

Rank	No.	Nat.	Po.	Name	Championship	FA Cup	League Cup	Total
1	13	(Turkey)	FW	Colin Kazim-Richards	8	0	0	8
2	9	(England)	FW	Martyn Waghorn	5	0	0	5
3	4	(Scotland)	MF	Graeme Shinnie	3	0	0	3
3	10	(Wales)	FW	Tom Lawrence	3	0	0	3
3	19	(England)	FW	Lee Gregory	3	0	0	3
3	38	(Republic of Ireland)	MF	Jason Knight	2	0	1	3
7	5	(Poland)	MF	Krystian Bielik	2	0	0	2
8	2	(England)	DF	Andre Wisdom	1	0	0	1
8	6	(England)	DF	George Edmundson	1	0	0	1
8	7	(Poland)	FW	Kamil Jóźwiak	1	0	0	1
8	14	(England)	FW	Jack Marriott	1	0	0	1
8	17	(England)	MF	Louie Sibley	1	0	0	1
8	23	(England)	FW	Patrick Roberts	1	0	0	1
8	25	(United States)	MF	Duane Holmes	1	0	0	1
8	32	(England)	MF	Wayne Rooney	1	0	0	1
Own goals					2	0	0	2
Total					36	0	1	37
