= Kornell McDonald =

English footballer

Personal information
- Full name: Kornell Mark Marshall Winston McDonald
- Date of birth: 1 October 2001 (age 25)
- Place of birth: Nottingham, England
- Position: Right-back

Team information
- Current team: Barwell

Youth career
- –2020: Derby County

Senior career*
Years	Team	Apps	(Gls)
2020–2022	Derby County	7	(0)
2022–2023	Kettering Town	3	(0)
2023	Bedford Town		
2023	Redditch United	10	(0)
2023	Gloucester City	9	(0)
2023–2024	Matlock Town	20	(0)
2024–2025	Rushall Olympic	13	(0)
2025	Ilkeston Town	13	(0)
2025–	Barwell	0	(0)
- * Club domestic league appearances and goals as of 14:52, 11 June 2025 (UTC)

Kornell Mark Marshall Winston McDonald (born 1 October 2001) is an English professional footballer who plays as a right-back for Northern Premier League Division One Midlands club Barwell.

== Club career ==
After graduating from the clubs academy, McDonald made his debut for Derby County as a substitute in a 0–0 draw with Brentford on 9 December 2020. After 8 first team appearances, McDonald was released by the club in July 2022.

On 27 September 2022, McDonald signed for National League North club Kettering Town. On 6 January 2023, he joined Bedford Town before joining Redditch United less than three weeks later.

On 19 August 2023, McDonald joined Gloucester City, he played 9 times for Gloucester before leaving the club on 13 November 2023. On 15 December 2023, McDonald joined Matlock Town of the Northern Premier League.

In August 2024, McDonald joined National League North side Rushall Olympic having impressed whilst on trial. In January 2025, he joined Ilkeston Town.

In June 2025, McDonald joined Southern League Premier Division Central side Barwell.

== Career statistics ==
As of match played 24 August 2021

Club	Season	League			FA Cup		League Cup		Other		Total	
Club	Season	Division	Apps	Goals	Apps	Goals	Apps	Goals	Apps	Goals	Apps	Goals
Derby County	2020–21	Championship	7	0	0	0	0	0	0	0	7	0
Derby County	2021–22	Championship	0	0	0	0	1	0	0	0	1	0
Career total			7	0	0	0	1	0	0	0	8	0
