= Louie Watson =

English footballer (born 2001)

Personal information
- Full name: Louie Shaun Watson
- Date of birth: 7 June 2001 (age 25)
- Place of birth: Croydon, England
- Height: 1.80 m (5 ft 11 in)
- Position: Attacking midfielder

Team information
- Current team: Crawley Town
- Number: 8

Youth career
- 2012–2020: West Ham United

Senior career*
Years	Team	Apps	(Gls)
2020–2022	Derby County	13	(0)
2022–2024	Luton Town	5	(0)
2023–2024	→ Charlton Athletic (loan)	21	(0)
2025–	Crawley Town	32	(1)

International career^{‡}
2016	England U15	2	(0)
2019	Republic of Ireland U18	2	(0)
2021	Republic of Ireland U21	5	(0)
- * Club domestic league appearances and goals as of 17:10, 6 May 2026 (UTC) ‡ National team caps and goals as of 17:10, 30 April 2024 (UTC)

Louie Shaun Watson (born 7 June 2001) is a professional footballer who plays as an attacking midfielder for EFL League Two club Crawley Town.

== Club career ==
=== Early career ===
Born in Croydon, Watson began playing youth football with Junior Elite FC in Beckenham aged 9 before joining West Ham United's academy at under-11 level. He signed his first professional contract with West Ham in May 2019.

=== Derby County ===
Watson joined Derby County in summer 2020 on a two-year contract. He was named in a Derby first team squad for the first-time for a match against Preston North End on 26 December 2020, and made his debut for Derby County in the following match as a substitute in a 4–0 win against Birmingham City on 29 December. He made his full debut for the club in a 2–2 draw with Brentford in March 2021, and made nine appearances in total during the 2020–21 season for Derby.

=== Luton Town ===
On 1 July 2022, Watson joined Championship club Luton Town for an undisclosed fee.

==== Charlton Athletic (loan) ====
On 1 September 2023, Watson signed for League One club Charlton Athletic on a season-long loan.

On 30 August 2024, Watson departed Luton Town having had his contract terminated by mutual consent.

=== Crawley Town ===
On 21 February 2025, Watson joined Crawley Town on a deal until the end of the 2025–26 season. He extended his contract for another two years in June 2026.

== International career ==
Watson was capped twice for England U15 in two friendlies against United States U15, before playing for the Republic of Ireland at U18 level. On 26 March 2021, Watson made his Republic of Ireland U21 debut playing 73 minutes in a 2–1 away win over Wales U21s. He made a total of 5 appearances for the 21s.

Watson is also eligible to represent Bangladesh through his paternal grandfather's Bangladeshi heritage.

== Personal life ==
He is the son of former footballer Steve Watson, who played non-League football for clubs including Sutton United and Aldershot Town.

== Career statistics ==
As of match played on 2 May 2026

Appearances and goals by club, season and competition
Club	Season	League			FA Cup		League Cup		Other		Total	
Club	Season	Division	Apps	Goals	Apps	Goals	Apps	Goals	Apps	Goals	Apps	Goals
West Ham United U23	2019–20	—							1 (Note: Appearance(s) in EFL Trophy)	0	1	0
Derby County	2020–21	Championship	9	0	0	0	0	0	—		9	0
Derby County	2021–22	Championship	4	0	0	0	2	0	—		6	0
Derby County	Total		13	0	0	0	2	0	—		15	0
Luton Town	2022–23	Championship	5	0	3	0	1	0	0	0	9	0
Luton Town	2023–24	Premier League	0	0	0	0	0	0	—		0	0
Luton Town	Total		5	0	3	0	1	0	0	0	9	0
Charlton Athletic (loan)	2023–24	League One	21	0	2	0	0	0	4	1	27	1
Crawley Town	2024–25	League One	7	0	—		—		—		7	0
Crawley Town	2025–26	League Two	25	1	1	0	1	0	0	0	27	1
Crawley Town	Total		32	1	1	0	1	0	0	0	34	1
Career total			71	1	6	0	4	0	5	1	86	2
