= Kaide Gordon =

English footballer (born 2004)

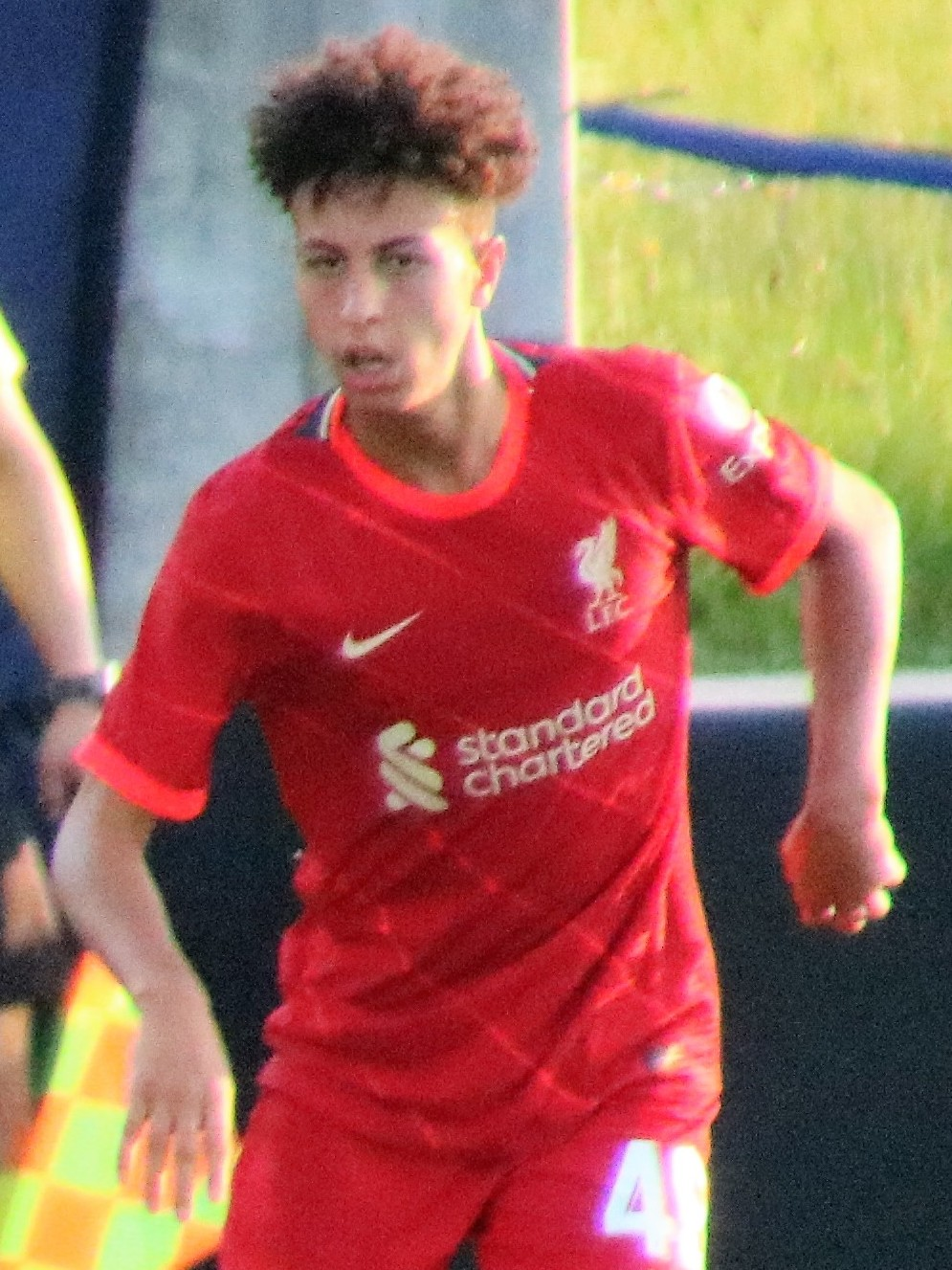
- Gordon playing for Liverpool in 2021

Personal information
- Full name: Kaide Sheene Gordon
- Date of birth: 5 October 2004 (age 22)
- Place of birth: Burton-on-Trent, England
- Height: 5 ft 8 in (1.73 m)
- Positions: Winger; attacking midfielder

Team information
- Current team: Liverpool
- Number: 49

Youth career
- 2013–2020: Derby County

Senior career*
Years	Team	Apps	(Gls)
2020–2021	Derby County	1	(0)
2021–	Liverpool	2	(0)
2024–2025	→ Norwich City (loan)	10	(1)
2025	→ Portsmouth (loan)	5	(0)

International career^{‡}
2020	England U16	2	(0)
2021	England U18	1	(0)
2024–	England U20	6	(1)
- * Club domestic league appearances and goals as of 15 March 2025 (UTC) ‡ National team caps and goals as of 13:34, 12 December 2024 (UTC)

Kaide Gordon (born 5 October 2004) is an English professional footballer who plays as a winger or attacking midfielder for Premier League club Liverpool.

== Early life ==
Gordon was born in Burton-upon-Trent, Staffordshire. He is of Jamaican descent.

== Club career ==
Gordon joined Derby County in 2013 at under-9 level and went onto to make his senior debut on 29 December 2020, as a substitute in a 4–0 win against Birmingham City.

On 5 February 2021, it was announced that Gordon had joined Liverpool. Derby County received an undisclosed compensation fee, reported to be in the region of £1 million, rising to £3 million with add-ons. Gordon made his Liverpool debut in an EFL Cup tie at Carrow Road where Liverpool beat Norwich City 3–0 on 21 September 2021. He scored his first goal for Liverpool against Shrewsbury in his second match for the club in the third round of the FA Cup, becoming Liverpool's second youngest goalscorer in all competitions, and their youngest ever scorer in the FA Cup. He made his English Premier League debut on 16 January 2022 as a second-half substitute against Brentford.

== International career ==
Having represented England at U16 level, Gordon made his England U18s debut during a 1–1 draw with Wales at Newport International Sports Village on 3 September 2021.

Gordon made his debut for the England Elite League squad as substitute during a 5-1 win over Poland at the Bialystok City Stadium on 22 March 2024.

== Personal life ==
Gordon's older brother Kellan Gordon is a professional footballer for Crawley Town.

== Career statistics ==
=== Club ===
As of match played 11 November 2025

Appearances and goals by club, season and competition
Club	Season	League			FA Cup		EFL Cup		Europe		Other		Total	
Club	Season	Division	Apps	Goals	Apps	Goals	Apps	Goals	Apps	Goals	Apps	Goals	Apps	Goals
Derby County	2020–21	Championship	1	0	0	0	0	0	—		—		1	0
Liverpool	2020–21	Premier League	0	0	—		—		0	0	—		0	0
Liverpool	2021–22	Premier League	1	0	1	1	2	0	0	0	—		4	1
Liverpool	2022–23	Premier League	0	0	0	0	0	0	0	0	0	0	0	0
Liverpool	2023–24	Premier League	1	0	1	0	0	0	1 (Note: Appearance in UEFA Europa League)	0	—		3	0
Liverpool	2025–26	Premier League	0	0	0	0	1	0	0	0	0	0	1	0
Liverpool	Total		2	0	2	1	3	0	1	0	0	0	8	1
Liverpool U21	2021–22	—			—		—		—		1 (Note: Appearance(s) in EFL Trophy)	0	1	0
Liverpool U21	2023–24	—			—		—		—		1	0	1	0
Liverpool U21	2025–26	—			—		—		—		3	2	3	2
Liverpool U21	Total		—		—		—		—		5	2	5	2
Norwich City (loan)	2024–25	Championship	10	1	0	0	—		—		—		10	1
Portsmouth (loan)	2024–25	Championship	5	0	—		—		—		—		5	0
Career total			18	1	2	1	3	0	1	0	5	2	29	4
