= Bobby Duncan (footballer, born 2001) =

English footballer (born 2001)

Personal information
- Full name: Bobby Frederick Duncan
- Date of birth: 26 June 2001 (age 25)
- Place of birth: Whiston, England
- Position: Striker

Youth career
- Mossley Hill
- St Helens Town
- 2010–2011: Wigan Athletic
- 2011–2017: Manchester City
- 2018–2019: Liverpool
- 2019–2020: Fiorentina
- 2020–2021: Derby County

Senior career*
Years	Team	Apps	(Gls)
2021–2022	Derby County	0	(0)
2022–2023	Linense	8	(0)
Total		8	(0)

International career
- England U16
- England U17
- * Club domestic league appearances and goals

Bobby Frederick Duncan (born 26 June 2001) is an English former professional footballer who played as a striker.

== Early and personal life ==
Duncan was born in Whiston and raised in Prescot. He attended Cardinal Heenan Catholic High School and St Bede's College.

He is a cousin of Steven Gerrard. He is a lifelong Liverpool fan.

== Club career ==
Duncan began his career with Mossley Hill, St Helens Town, Wigan Athletic and Manchester City.

He left Manchester City in August 2017, and spent a year without a club as they retained his registration, before signing a three-year professional contract with Liverpool in 2018. He was part of the side that won the 2018–19 FA Youth Cup, Liverpool's fourth triumph in the competition, scoring a late equaliser in the final against his former team Manchester City.

He made his senior debut for Liverpool in a pre-season friendly against Tranmere Rovers in July 2019, scoring the final goal in a 6–0 win.

In August 2019 he was linked with a move away from the club, and his agent accused Liverpool of "bullying", which the club denied. He later expressed regret about how he had left Liverpool.

In September 2019 he signed for Italian club Fiorentina. He returned to England in September 2020, signing a three-year contract with Derby County. He made his senior debut on 9 January 2021, in a 2–0 FA Cup loss away at non-league club Chorley. At the start of the 2021–22 season he trained with Plymouth Argyle, although the clubs could not agree terms for a loan move.

In July 2022 he signed for Spanish club Linense. He left the club in 2023, and thereafter remained without a club.

== International career ==
He has represented England at under-16 and under-17 youth level.

== Career statistics ==
As of match played 16 May 2023

Appearances and goals by club, season and competition
Club	Season	League			National cup		League cup		Other		Total	
Club	Season	Division	Apps	Goals	Apps	Goals	Apps	Goals	Apps	Goals	Apps	Goals
Derby County	2020–21	Championship	0	0	1	0	0	0	—		1	0
Linense	2022–23	Primera Federación	8	0	0	0	0	0	—		8	0
Total			8	0	1	0	0	0	0	0	9	0
