= Jahmal Hector-Ingram =

English footballer (born 1998)

Personal information
- Full name: Jahmal Justin Hector-Ingram
- Date of birth: 11 November 1998 (age 28)
- Place of birth: Upton Park, England
- Height: 6 ft 0 in (1.83 m)
- Position: Forward

Team information
- Current team: Sheppey Sports

Youth career
- –2019: West Ham United
- 2019–2020: Derby County

Senior career*
Years	Team	Apps	(Gls)
2020–2021	Derby County	8	(0)
2021	→ Stevenage (loan)	1	(0)
2022	St Johnstone	0	(0)
2022–2023	Hastings United	8	(1)
2023	Maldon & Tiptree	1	(0)
2024	Hythe Town	3	(0)
2024	Sheppey United	5	(0)
2024–2026	Sheppey Sports	25	(16)

International career^{‡}
2013–2014	England U16	2	(1)
2014–2015	England U17	9	(2)
- * Club domestic league appearances and goals as of 10:15, 26 October 2025 (UTC) ‡ National team caps and goals as of 20:40, 8 July 2020 (UTC)

Jahmal Justin Hector-Ingram (born 11 November 1998) is an English professional footballer who plays as a forward for Sheppey Sports. After beginning his career with Derby County, he played briefly for St Johnstone before his release at the end of the 2021–22 season.

== Early life ==
Hector-Ingram was born in Upton Park, London.

== Club career ==
Hector-Ingram started his career at West Ham United's academy, and joined Derby County in August 2019 following a successful trial.

He made his debut for Derby County as a substitute in a 2–0 away defeat to West Bromwich Albion on 8 July 2020. At the end of the 2019–20 Premier League 2 season he was nominated for the Player of the Season award after scoring 22 goals across all competitions prior to the early end to the season due to the COVID-19 pandemic.

On 1 February 2021, he joined Stevenage on loan until the end of the season. He was released by Derby at the end of the 2020–21 season.

On 1 February 2022, Hector-Ingram joined Scottish Premiership side St Johnstone on a free transfer until the end of the season. He departed the club at the end of the season.

On 2 December 2022, following a period of training at the club, Hector-Ingram joined Isthmian League side Hastings United on a permanent deal.

In November 2023, Hector-Ingram joined Maldon & Tiptree.

In October 2024, Hector-Ingram joined Isthmian League South East Division side Sheppey United following a short spell with Hythe Town.

== International career ==
Hector-Ingram has represented England at U16 and U17 level.

== Career statistics ==
As of end of 2022–23 season

Appearances and goals by club, season and competition
Club	Season	League			FA Cup		League Cup		Other		Total	
Club	Season	Division	Apps	Goals	Apps	Goals	Apps	Goals	Apps	Goals	Apps	Goals
West Ham United U21	2016–17	—			—		—		2 (Note: Appearance(s) in EFL Trophy)	0	2	0
West Ham United U21	2017–18	—			—		—		3	0	3	0
West Ham United U21	2018–19	—			—		—		1	0	1	0
West Ham United U21	Total		0	0	0	0	0	0	6	0	6	0
Derby County	2019–20	Championship	1	0	0	0	0	0	0	0	1	0
Derby County	2020–21	Championship	7	0	0	0	0	0	0	0	7	0
Derby County	Total		8	0	0	0	0	0	0	0	8	0
Stevenage (loan)	2020–21	League Two	1	0	0	0	0	0	0	0	1	0
Hastings United	2022–23	Isthmian League Premier Division	8	1	0	0	—		0	0	8	1
Career total			17	1	0	0	0	0	6	0	23	1
