= Bernardo Rosa =

Brazilian footballer (born 2000)

Personal information
- Full name: Bernardo Costa da Rosa
- Date of birth: 20 September 2000 (age 26)
- Place of birth: Rio de Janeiro, Brazil
- Position: Midfielder

Team information
- Current team: Esporte Clube Taubaté

Youth career
- –2016: Flamengo
- 2016–2022: West Ham United

Senior career*
Years	Team	Apps	(Gls)
2022–2025	Pardubice	9	(0)
2022–2025	Pardubice B	12	(3)
2023–2024	→ Viktoria Žižkov (loan)	30	(3)
2024–2025	→ FC Vlašim (loan)	23	(1)
- * Club domestic league appearances and goals

Bernardo Costa da Rosa (born 20 September 2000) is a Brazilian footballer.

== Career ==
In 2016, Rosa joined the youth academy of English Premier League side West Ham United. In 2022, he signed for Pardubice in the Czech Republic. On 31 July 2022, he debuted for Pardubice during a 0–2 loss to Budějovice.

In 2025 he moved back to Brazil, joining Esporte Clube Taubaté, a non-league side competing in Brazil’s second division of the São Paulo state championship.
