= 2008 Victory Shield =

The Victory Shield 2008 is the 63rd edition of the Victory Shield, an annual football tournament that began in 1925 and is competed for by the Under 16 level teams of England, Scotland, Northern Ireland and Wales. It was held from 3 October to 29 November 2008 and won by England.

== Venues ==
Country	Stadium	Capacity
England	Sincil Bank	10,127
Northern Ireland	Ballymena Showgrounds	5,200
Northern Ireland	Mourneview Park	5,000
Scotland	Broadwood Stadium	8,006
Scotland	Dens Park	11,200
Wales	Stebonheath Park	3,700

== Final table ==
Teams	GP	W	D	L	GF	GA	GD	Pts
England	3	3	0	0	9	0	+9	9
Scotland	3	1	1	1	4	5	-1	4
Wales	3	1	0	2	2	3	-1	3
Northern Ireland	3	0	1	2	2	9	-7	1

== Matches and Results ==
3 October 2008

Northern Ireland	0 – 6	England
	Report	Afobe 7' 57'; Ben Oliver 42' (og); Barkley 53'; Jake Fowler 74'; Morrison 80'

Ballymena Showgrounds, Northern Ireland

17 October 2008

Scotland	2 – 1	Wales
David Smith 21'; Fraser Fyvie 80'	Report	Aaron Holloway 55'

Broadwood Stadium, Scotland

31 October 2008

Wales	0 – 1	England
	Report	Afobe

Stebonheath Park, Wales

7 November 2008

Scotland	2 – 2	Northern Ireland
Jamie Walker 59'; Callum McGregor 76'	Report	Josh Carson 66'; John Edgar 78'

Dens Park, Scotland

21 November 2008

Northern Ireland	0 – 1	Wales
	[ Report]

Mourneview Park, Northern Ireland

28 November 2008

England	2 – 0	Scotland
Afobe; Wickham	Report

Sincil Bank, England

== See also ==
- Victory Shield
