= Cameron Cresswell =

English footballer

Personal information
- Full name: Cameron Ian Cresswell
- Date of birth: 12 September 1999 (age 27)
- Height: 1.78 m (5 ft 10 in)
- Position: Forward

Youth career
- –2021: Derby County

Senior career*
Years	Team	Apps	(Gls)
2021	Derby County	1	(0)
2021–2022	Start	26	(2)
2023–2024	Waterford	12	(3)
2026–Present	Savills Dubai F.C	1	(4)
- * Club domestic league appearances and goals as of 18:14, 19 July 2024 (UTC)

Cameron Ian Cresswell (born 12 September 1999) is an English professional footballer who plays as a forward, most recently for League of Ireland Premier Division side Waterford.

== Career ==
Cresswell made his debut for Derby County in a 2–0 FA Cup loss to Chorley on 9 January 2021. He was one of fourteen players from Derby County's academy to make their debut in the game, after the entirety of Derby's first team squad and coaching team were forced to isolate due to a COVID-19 outbreak. He made his league debut as a substitute in a 1–0 loss to Stoke City on 20 March 2021. During the 2020–21 season Cresswell scored 11 goals in 19 games for the Derby County under-23s. Despite this, Cresswell was released by Derby at the end of the 2020–21 season.

On 9 August 2021, Cresswell joined Norwegian First Division side Start on a deal until the end of the 2022 season. He left the club following the end of his contract.

On 13 July 2023, Cresswell signed for League of Ireland First Division side Waterford.

== Career statistics ==
As of match played 2 February 2024

Appearances and goals by club, season and competition
Club	Season	League			National cup (Note: Includes FA Cup, Norwegian Cup & FAI Cup)		League cup		Total	
Club	Season	Division	Apps	Goals	Apps	Goals	Apps	Goals	Apps	Goals
Derby County	2020–21	Championship	1	0	1	0	0	0	2	0
Start	2021	Norwegian First Division	15	1	1	0	—		16	1
Start	2022	Norwegian First Division	11	1	3	5	—		14	6
Start	Total		26	2	4	5	—		30	7
Waterford	2023	LOI First Division	12	3	2	1	2 (Note: Appearances in the 2023 League of Ireland First Division Play-offs)	0	16	4
Waterford	2024	LOI Premier Division	0	0	0	0	2 (Note: Appearances in the Munster Senior Cup)	1	2	1
Waterford	Total		12	3	0	0	4	1	18	5
Career total			39	5	7	6	4	1	50	12
