= Justin Walker (footballer) =

English footballer (born 1975)

Personal information
- Full name: Justin Matthew Walker
- Date of birth: 6 September 1975 (age 51)
- Place of birth: Nottingham, England
- Height: 6 ft 0 in (1.83 m)
- Position: Midfielder

Team information
- Current team: Paris FC (assistant coach)

Youth career
- 1991–1992: Nottingham Forest

Senior career*
Years	Team	Apps	(Gls)
1992–1997	Nottingham Forest	0	(0)
1997–2000	Scunthorpe United	132	(2)
2000–2002	Lincoln City	76	(4)
2002–2003	Exeter City	39	(5)
2003–2005	Cambridge United	59	(2)
2004	→ York City (loan)	9	(0)
2005–2006	Chester City	21	(0)
2006–2008	Ilkeston Town	34	(1)
2008	FC Halifax Town	8	(0)
Total		378	(14)

International career
- England Youth
- England Schoolboys

Managerial career
- 2020: Derby County (co-interim)
- 2022–2024: Hull City (assistant)
- 2024–2026: Strasbourg (assistant)
- 2026–: Paris FC (assistant)
- * Club domestic league appearances and goals

Justin Matthew Walker (born 6 September 1975) is an English professional football manager and former player who is currently assistant coach of Ligue 1 club Paris FC.

As a player he was a midfielder who made more than 300 Football League appearances for six different clubs from 1997 to 2006. He notably played for Scunthorpe United and Lincoln City having come through the Nottingham Forest academy. He later played professionally for Exeter City, Cambridge United, York City and Chester City before finishing his career in Non-league football with Ilkeston Town and FC Halifax Town.

Walker has previously had a spell as co-interim manager of Derby County before the appointment of Wayne Rooney.

== Playing career ==
As a youngster, Walker represented England at youth and schoolboy level and signed professional forms with Nottingham Forest in September 1992. But he failed to break into the first-team with Forest and joined Scunthorpe United in March 1997. Walker was a regular with United until he moved to Lincoln City in July 2000, playing in the 1998–99 Football League Division Three play-off final win at Wembley Stadium against Leyton Orient. After two years with Lincoln, in which he was named Player of the Season for the 2000–01 season, financial difficulties due to the ITV Digital collapse meant that Walker was released at the end of his contract.

Walker joined Exeter City in August 2002, but his solitary season with the Grecians ended in relegation from the Football League.

Walker joined Cambridge United in 2003 and suffered relegation in the 2004–05 season. Walker achieved a possibly unique hat-trick of successive relegations out of the league by playing for York City on loan for two months in the 2003–04 season.

Walker joined Chester City ahead of the 2005–06 campaign, where he was to manage just 13 league starts. With six weeks of the season remaining Chester lay bottom of the League Two table and Walker seemed set for yet another relegation experience, but a late run of wins saved City from the drop. However, Walker was released in the summer of 2006 and joined Ilkeston Town.

On 2 August 2008, he linked up with his former Ilkeston manager Nigel Jemson at FC Halifax Town debuting in their inaugural match, a 3–0 home defeat to Bamber Bridge on 16 August 2008. After starting Town's first seven league games, Walker found himself dropped to the substitutes bench and, after one further league appearance from the bench, he was released in November 2008.

== Coaching career ==
On 3 September 2020, after a number of years as part of Derby County's academy staff, Justin was handed the role of Derby County's first-team development coach in Phillip Cocu's backroom team. In November 2020, he was one of the caretaker management team appointed following the dismissal of Cocu. After Wayne Rooney took sole charge shortly after, Walker returned to his first-team development role.

In November 2022, he joined Hull City as the Assistant Head coach to Liam Rosenior.

In June 2023, Walker gained his UEFA Pro Licence.

In July 2024, Walker joined Rosenior at Strasbourg.

== Honours ==
Scunthorpe United

- Football League Third Division play-offs: 1999
