= Liam Thompson =

Liam Thompson may refer to:

- Liam Thompson (footballer) (born 2002), English footballer
- Liam Thompson (rugby league) (born 1992), English rugby player
- Liam Thompson (YouTuber) (born 2000), New Zealand YouTube personality

== See also ==
- List of people with given name Liam
