= Sonny Bradley =

English footballer (born 1991)

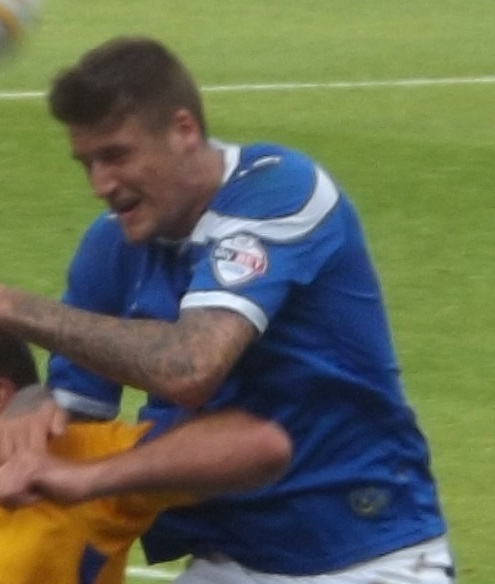
- Bradley playing for Portsmouth 2013

Personal information
- Full name: Sonny Bradley
- Date of birth: 13 September 1991 (age 35)
- Place of birth: Kingston upon Hull, England
- Height: 6 ft 5 in (1.96 m)
- Position: Centre-back

Team information
- Current team: Lincoln City
- Number: 15

Youth career
- 1999–2010: Hull City

Senior career*
Years	Team	Apps	(Gls)
2010–2013	Hull City	2	(0)
2010	→ Harrogate Town (loan)	6	(0)
2011	→ IK Frej (loan)	5	(1)
2012	→ Aldershot Town (loan)	14	(0)
2012–2013	→ Aldershot Town (loan)	42	(1)
2013–2014	Portsmouth	33	(2)
2014–2016	Crawley Town	72	(2)
2016–2018	Plymouth Argyle	84	(11)
2018–2023	Luton Town	163	(5)
2023–2025	Derby County	40	(3)
2025	→ Wycombe Wanderers (loan)	17	(1)
2025–	Lincoln City	57	(3)
- * Club domestic league appearances and goals as of 17:01, 21 November 2026 (UTC)

Sonny Bradley (born 13 September 1991) is an English professional footballer who plays as a centre-back for EFL Championship club Lincoln City.

== Early life ==
Bradley was born and raised in Kingston upon Hull, East Riding of Yorkshire. He progressed through the Hull City youth ranks, joining the club at the age of seven. While in the youth ranks at Hull City, Bradley met his childhood friend, Danny East, who he has known for more than ten years.

== Career ==
=== Hull City ===
In October 2010, he was sent out on loan to Conference North club Harrogate Town, making his debut in a 3–2 win over Worcester City. He made seven appearances for the Town, scoring in an FA Trophy tie with Witton Albion.

In April 2011, he joined Division 1 Norra team IK Frej on a one-month loan after going on trial with the club. Bradley made his debut on 25 April, against BK Forward, and scoring against Dalkurd FF on 7 May. He returned to Hull after making five appearances and scoring once.

He was offered his first professional contract by Hull City in the summer of 2011. Bradley was also a former pupil at Kelvin Hall School and at sixteen, Bradley missed out the apprenticeship.

In January 2012, he joined League Two club Aldershot Town on a one-month loan deal. He made his professional debut on 7 January 2012, in a 3–0 defeat to Oxford United at the Recreation Ground. The loan period was later extended to 7 April 2012. He finished the season with 14 appearances for Aldershot before being recalled by Hull on 29 March 2012.

He made his league debut for Hull on 31 March when he was used as a half-time substitute for captain Jack Hobbs in the 0–2 defeat by Coventry City at the KC Stadium. He was handed his first start on 7 April, in a 0–2 defeat against Millwall.

On 7 August 2012, Bradley returned to Aldershot in a season-long loan. He made his second debut for the club on 11 August, against Wolverhampton Wanderers. On 23 October, Bradley scored his first career goal, an 87th-minute header in a 2–1 win against Southend United. He finished the season with 42 league appearances, scoring once. Despite relegation to Conference Premier, Bradley says his time at Aldershot Town in his second spell helped him improved as a player.

Bradley was released at the end of 2012–13 season.

=== Portsmouth ===
After his release from Hull, Bradley signed a two-year deal with Portsmouth on 9 May 2013, where he will joining with Danny East. Bradley revealed he turned down a move from Championship and League One clubs in favour joining Portsmouth. Bradley would also take number six shirt at the club.

He made his debut in a 4–1 home defeat to Oxford United on 3 August 2013. Despite the loss, Bradley was impressed with the club's supporters attendance at the stadium. Since his debut, Bradley had an extended run of the first team and then on 1 January 2014, Bradley scored his first goal for the club and also the first goal of 2014 for the club, as Portsmouth lose 2–1 to Southend United. But towards the end of the season, Bradley would be often used in first team ins and out, mostly on the substitution bench. Bradley would then score his second goal of the season, just ten minutes after coming on as a substitute, in a 4–4 draw against Bury on 26 April 2014, in which it turns out to be his last appearance for the club.

=== Crawley Town ===
On 17 June 2014, Bradley signed a two-year contract at Crawley Town, from Portsmouth for an undisclosed fee. Crawley had fought off competition from Championship clubs for his signature.

=== Plymouth Argyle ===
On 11 July 2016, Bradley signed for Plymouth Argyle. He was offered a new contract by Plymouth at the end of the 2017–18 season. After two successful campaigns with Plymouth, Bradley opted not to renew his contract and left on 8 June 2018, having made 95 appearances for the Devon club.

=== Luton Town ===
Bradley agreed to sign for newly promoted League One club Luton Town on 12 June 2018 on a three-year contract, effective from 1 July. He scored his first goal for Luton with a half volley from 25 yards on the opening day of the 2019–20 season in a 3–3 home draw with Middlesbrough.

On 10 May 2023, it was announced that Bradley would be departing the club following the conclusion of their play-off campaign.

=== Derby County ===
On 7 July 2023, Bradley signed for Derby County on a free transfer. Bradley made his debut in a 2–1 opening day home defeat against Wigan Athletic, in which his wayward backpass resulted in Wigan's opening goal. After Derby lost two of the next three games, a 2–0 EFL Cup defeat to Blackpool and a 2–1 league defeat to Oxford, Bradley lost his place in the first team following criticism of his performances; Derby subsequently won the next two games.

Bradley came on as a 17th-minute substitute away at Bolton, but, with Derby level at 1–1, again made a vital mistake which led to Derby keeper Joe Wildsmith being sent-off when trying to rescue the situation; Derby went on to lose 2–1. After this, Derby changed formation to a back 4 and Bradley was mainly used as a substitute as Eiran Cashin and Curtis Nelson became the preferred central defensive pairing, Bradley stated his "frustration" at losing his place as his starts in the league came as Cashin picked up minor injuries and suspensions.

In early 2024, Derby head coach Paul Warne went back to a back 5 formation when Warne used this system, Bradley became a starter and then on 24 February 2024, Bradley scored his first goal for the club, a headed goal against Barnsley, Bradley scored the opening goal in the match, but Derby lost 2–1. Bradley's performances were much improved from his August 2023 displays.

Bradley had his longest run in the starting 11, with nine starts in eleven league matches in February and March, however this run would ended as he picked up a direct red card in Derby's 1–0 defeat at Northampton Town for a headbutt at Northampton's Manny Monthé, the red card resulted in an automatic three-game suspension with neither Derby nor the player appealed the suspension despite claims from Bradley of no wrongdoing on his behalf.

On 13 April 2024, Bradley made his return from his suspension in a home match against Leyton Orient, Bradley scored two goals 3–0 win. Bradley would help Derby keep clean sheets in their last two matches of the season, as they gained promotion to the Championship after finishing runners-up in League One. Bradley made 41 appearances for his first season for Derby, scoring three goals.

Bradley; who was fourth choice centre-back behind Eiran Cashin, Curtis Nelson and Nat Phillips only made nine appearances for Derby during the 2024–25 season.

On 16 May 2025; it was announced by Derby County the Bradley's contract would not be renewed upon its expiry in June 2025; he played 50 times for Derby, scoring 3 times in his two seasons at Derby.

==== Wycombe Wanderers (loan) ====
Sonny signed for Wycombe Wanderers of League One on loan on 6 January 2025 for the second half of the season. On 10 January 2025, Bradley scored his first goal for the club in the 2024-25 FA Cup Third Round tie against Portsmouth. On 18 March 2025, Bradley scored in Wycombe's 3–2 win at Rotherham United. Bradley played 21 times for Wycombe during his loan spell; scoring twice as Wycombe's season ended in defeat to Charlton Athletic in the League One play-offs.

=== Lincoln City ===
On 20 June 2025, Lincoln City announced the signing of Bradley to a two-year contract, from 1 July 2025 once his Derby County contract had expired. He made his debut, starting in the opening day 2–0 win against Reading. In August he scored his first goal against Mansfield Town, but in a mixed game he would also see himself get sent off a few minutes later. He received a nomination for player of the month for March, due to being a rock in the Lincoln defence all season, whilst helping keep 3 clean sheets from 5 games that month. In April, he was nominated for League One player of the season, alongside team mate Jack Moylan as well as Dom Ballard and Owen Bailey. After winning promotion from League One in the 2025–26 season, he was named in the EFL League One Team of the Season alongside teammates, George Wickens, Jack Moylan and Tendayi Darikwa as well as being nominated for League One player of the season, alongside team mate Jack Moylan as well as Dom Ballard and Owen Bailey. He was awarded Lincoln City's player of the season following the end of the 2025–26 season.

== Career statistics ==
As of 21 November 2026

Appearances and goals by club, season and competition
Club	Season	League			National cup (Note: Includes FA Cup)		League cup (Note: Includes League/EFL Cup)		Other		Total	
Club	Season	Division	Apps	Goals	Apps	Goals	Apps	Goals	Apps	Goals	Apps	Goals
Hull City	2010–11	Championship	0	0	0	0	0	0	—		0	0
Hull City	2011–12	Championship	2	0	0	0	0	0	—		2	0
Hull City	2012–13	Championship	0	0	—		—		—		0	0
Hull City	Total		2	0	0	0	0	0	—		2	0
Harrogate Town (loan)	2010–11	Conference North	6	0	—		—		1 (Note: Appearance in FA Trophy)	1	7	1
IK Frej (loan)	2011	Division 1 Norra	5	1	—		—		—		5	1
Aldershot Town (loan)	2011–12	League Two	14	0	—		—		—		14	0
Aldershot Town (loan)	2012–13	League Two	42	1	4	0	1	0	1 (Note: Appearance(s) in EFL Trophy)	0	48	1
Aldershot Town (loan)	Total		56	1	4	0	1	0	1	0	62	1
Portsmouth	2013–14	League Two	33	2	1	0	1	0	3	0	38	2
Crawley Town	2014–15	League One	26	1	0	0	1	0	3	0	30	1
Crawley Town	2015–16	League Two	46	1	1	0	1	0	1	0	49	1
Crawley Town	Total		72	2	1	0	2	0	4	0	79	2
Plymouth Argyle	2016–17	League Two	44	7	5	0	1	0	2	0	52	7
Plymouth Argyle	2017–18	League One	40	4	2	0	1	0	1	0	44	4
Plymouth Argyle	Total		84	11	7	0	2	0	3	0	96	11
Luton Town	2018–19	League One	45	0	4	0	1	0	0	0	50	0
Luton Town	2019–20	Championship	40	3	0	0	0	0	—		40	3
Luton Town	2020–21	Championship	37	0	1	0	3	0	—		41	0
Luton Town	2021–22	Championship	22	2	1	0	0	0	2 (Note: Appearance(s) in English Football League play-offs)	1	25	3
Luton Town	2022–23	Championship	20	0	0	0	0	0	0	0	20	0
Luton Town	Total		164	5	6	0	4	0	2	1	176	6
Derby County	2023–24	League One	33	3	2	0	1	0	5	0	41	3
Derby County	2024–25	Championship	7	0	0	0	2	0	—		9	0
Derby County	Total		40	3	2	0	3	0	5	0	50	3
Wycombe Wanderers (loan)	2024–25	League One	17	1	2	1	—		2	0	21	1
Lincoln City	2025–26	League One	45	3	1	0	2	0	3	1	51	4
Lincoln City	2026–27	Championship	12	0	0	0	1	0	—		13	0
Lincoln City	Total		57	3	1	0	3	0	3	0	64	4
Career total			536	29	24	1	16	0	24	3	599	33

== Honours ==
Luton Town

- EFL Championship play-offs: 2023
- EFL League One: 2018–19

Derby County

- EFL League One second-place promotion: 2023–24

Lincoln City

- EFL League One: 2025–26

Individual

- EFL Team of the Season: 2016–17
- PFA Team of the Year: 2016–17 League Two, 2025–26 League One
- EFL League One Team of the Season: 2025–26
- Lincoln City Player of the Season: 2025–26
