= 2024–25 Derby County F.C. season =

141st season in existence of Derby County FC

Derby County
2024–25 season
- Owner: David Clowes
- Head coach: Paul Warne (until 7 February); Matt Hamshaw (interim); John Eustace (from 13 February)
- Stadium: Pride Park Stadium
- Championship: 19th
- FA Cup: Third round
- EFL Cup: Second round
- Top goalscorer: League: Jerry Yates (10); All: Jerry Yates (10)
- Highest home attendance: 32,471 vs Stoke City, 3 May 2025, Championship
- Lowest home attendance: 8,538 vs Chesterfield, 13 August 2024, EFL Cup
- Average home league attendance: 29,018
- Biggest win: 4–0 vs Portsmouth (H), 13 December 2024, Championship
- Biggest defeat: 0–4 vs Queens Park Rangers (A), 14 February 2025, Championship
Home colours	Away colours	Third colours

The 2024–25 season was Derby County's 126th season in the Football League and their 55th in the second tier of English football. It was their first season in the Championship since 2022 following their promotion as runners-up in League One in the previous campaign. They also competed in the FA Cup and the EFL Cup.

== Review ==
=== Pre-season ===
1 July saw the start of pre-season for the 2024–25 campaign, with the players returning to training after the summer break. As 30 June had seen the final day of a number of players contracts, 1 July also saw the official departure of Dwight Gayle, Conor Hourihane, Scott Loach, Korey Smith, Martyn Waghorn, and Joe Wildsmith from the first team as had been announced via the release of the club's retained list six-weeks previously.

Louie Sibley joined Oxford United following his rejection of a new contract. Conversely, Corey Blackett-Taylor saw his loan deal from Charlton Athletic become a permanent deal, and Ben Osborn joined on a free from Sheffield United. The third and fourth signings of the summer followed the next day, with Kayden Jackson arriving on a free transfer following his release by Ipswich Town and Jerry Yates coming in on a season-long loan from Swansea City.

After this flurry, the next signing came a week later, with Dutch midfielder Kenzo Goudmijn joining from AZ Alkmaar; a week after that Gambian midfielder Ebou Adams, a popular loanee in the promotion campaign the previous season, signed on a permanent deal from Cardiff City. The midfield was further strengethed with the signing of Crystal Palace's David Ozoh.

=== August ===
Derby's first Championship game in two years came on Friday 9 August with a trip to Ewood Park to play Blackburn Rovers. The match saw the full debuts of Kenzo Goudmijn, David Ozoh, Ben Osborn, and Kayden Jackson but ended in a 4–2 defeat despite the game being level at 1–1 with 20 minutes remaining. Paul Warne put the late collapse down to Blackburn's substitutes saying 'They changed it and brought on cheat codes all over the place. We looked a little bit leggy and it's my fault because I didn't make the subs quick enough.' Four days later, Derby earned their first win of the campaign with a 2–1 home victory over League Two Chesterfield in the EFL Cup 1st round, with Jackson scoring the winner with his first goal for the club on his home debut. Derby's first week back in the second tier ended with the announcement that the club has completed its protracted pursuit of Djurgårdens IF Sweden international goalkeeper Jacob Widell Zetterström for an undisclosed fee rumoured to be around £1.4m. A surprise outgoing was midfielder Tyrese Fornah who dropped two divisions to join League Two Salford City. Warne said of the move 'I want people that want to be here. He was frustrated he wasn't getting enough game time that his ability deserved. I was disappointed. I didn't want him to go. He goes with my blessing and I wish him all the best.'

Derby's first championship home game of the season came against Middlesbrough, with the Rams gaining their first league win of the new season as they ran out out 1–0 victors thanks to Jackson's 14th-minute goal, his second goal in consecutive games, with Warne believing that the team 'stepped up a level' and praising the efforts of the players. Derby followed up on this victory with a 2–1 defeat away at Watford despite taking a 2nd-minute lead through Ebou Adams first goal of the season.

As Warne continued in his attempts to strengthen the squad, the club signed Wolves winger Tawanda Chirewa on a season-long loan on 26 August. Chirewa went straight into the side for the EFL Cup 2nd round tie away to League Two Barrow, with Derby exiting the competition on penalties following a 0–0 draw; this was Derby's third consecutive cup exit at the hands of a fourth tier side, following defeats to Crewe Alexandra in the FA Cup 1st round and Bradford City in the EFL Trophy round of 16 the previous campaign.

With the transfer window closing on 30 August, Derby concluded their transfer business for the summer with the season long loan signings of Liverpool centre-back Nat Phillips and Ipswich Town winger Marcus Harness. Neither player signed in time for inclusion in the following day's fixture at home to Bristol City. Despite this, Derby ran out comfortable 3–0 winners, their eight consecutive league home win and their biggest win in the second tier since a 4–0 victory at Birmingham City in December 2020. Goudmijn and Ozoh both scored their first goals for the club, either side of a goal from Jackson's third goal in as many games at Pride Park. Warne described it as 'the best Derby performance I’ve seen since I’ve been here'.

== Players ==
As of 5 April 2025

List includes all first team players and any other matchday squad players

No.	Name	Position	Nationality	Date of birth (age)	Signed from	Signed	Fee	Contract ends
Goalkeepers
1	Jacob Widell Zetterström	GK	(Sweden)	11 July 1998 (aged 26)	(Sweden) Djurgården	2024	Undisclosed	2027
13	Rohan Luthra	GK	(England)	6 May 2002 (aged 23)	(Wales) Cardiff City	2024	Free	2025
31	Josh Vickers	GK	(England)	1 December 1995 (aged 29)	Rotherham United	2023	Free	2026
Defenders
2	Kane Wilson	RB	(England)	11 March 2000 (aged 25)	Bristol City	2023	Undisclosed	2026
3	Craig Forsyth	LB	(Scotland)	24 February 1989 (aged 36)	Watford	2013	£150,000	2025
6	Sondre Langås	CB	(Norway)	2 February 2001 (aged 24)	(Norway) Viking	2025	Undisclosed	2029
12	Nat Phillips	CB	(England)	21 March 1997 (aged 28)	Liverpool	2024	Loan	2025
20	Callum Elder	LB	(Australia)	27 January 1995 (aged 30)	Hull City	2023	Free	2026
21	Jake Rooney	CB	(England)	22 August 2003 (aged 21)	Burnley	2022	Free	2026
24	Ryan Nyambe	RB	(Namibia)	4 December 1997 (aged 27)	Free Agent	2023	—N/a	2027
25	Matt Clarke	CB	(England)	22 September 1996 (aged 28)	Middlesbrough	2025	Undisclosed	2028
33	Erik Pieters	CB	(Netherlands)	7 August 1988 (aged 36)	Free Agent	2025	—N/a	2025
35	Curtis Nelson	CB	(England)	21 May 1993 (aged 32)	Blackpool	2023	Free	2026
36	Keilen Robinson	CB	(England)	2 October 2005 (aged 19)	Academy	2022	—N/a	2026
47	Dan Cox	CB	(Wales)	30 January 2006 (aged 19)	Academy	2022	—N/a	
Midfielders
4	David Ozoh	DM	(England)	6 May 2005 (aged 20)	Crystal Palace	2024	Loan	2025
8	Ben Osborn	CM	(England)	5 August 1994 (aged 30)	Sheffield United	2024	Free	2026
16	Liam Thompson	DM	(England)	29 April 2002 (aged 23)	Academy	2018	—N/a	2025
17	Kenzo Goudmijn	CM	(Netherlands)	18 December 2001 (aged 23)	(Netherlands) AZ Alkmaar	2024	Undisclosed	2028
18	Marcus Harness	AM	(Republic of Ireland)	24 February 1996 (aged 29)	Ipswich Town	2024	Loan	2025
23	Joe Ward	RM	(England)	22 August 1995 (aged 29)	Peterborough United	2023	Free	2026
26	Darren Robinson	DM	(Northern Ireland)	29 December 2004 (aged 20)	(Northern Ireland) Dungannon Swifts	2021	Undisclosed	2026
28	Harrison Armstrong	CM	(England)	19 January 2007 (aged 18)	Everton	2025	Loan	2025
29	Jeff Hendrick	CM	(Republic of Ireland)	31 January 1992 (aged 33)	Free Agent	2025	—N/a	2025
32	Ebou Adams	CM	(The Gambia)	15 January 1996 (aged 29)	(Wales) Cardiff City	2024	Undisclosed	2027
37	Owen Eames	CM	(England)	1 November 2006 (aged 18)	Academy	2023	—N/a	2025
40	Freddie Turley	DM	(Republic of Ireland)	3 July 2006 (aged 18)	(Republic of Ireland) Shamrock Rovers	2024	Undisclosed	2027
43	Cruz Allen	AM	(Wales)	25 February 2007 (aged 18)	Academy	2023	—N/a	2026
Forwards
7	Tom Barkhuizen	LW	(England)	4 July 1993 (aged 31)	Preston North End	2022	Free	2025
9	Kemar Roofe	CF	(Jamaica)	6 January 1993 (aged 32)	Free Agent	2025	—N/a	2025
10	Jerry Yates	CF	(England)	10 November 1996 (aged 28)	(Wales) Swansea City	2024	Loan	2025
11	Nathaniel Mendez-Laing	RW	(Guatemala)	15 April 1992 (aged 33)	Sheffield Wednesday	2022	Free	2026
14	Conor Washington	CF	(Northern Ireland)	18 May 1992 (aged 33)	Rotherham United	2023	Undisclosed	2025
15	Lars-Jørgen Salvesen	CF	(Norway)	19 February 1996 (aged 29)	(Norway) Viking	2025	Undisclosed	2027
19	Kayden Jackson	CF	(England)	22 February 1994 (aged 31)	Ipswich Town	2024	Free	2026
27	Corey Blackett-Taylor	LW	(England)	23 September 1997 (aged 27)	Charlton Athletic	2024	Free	2027
38	Charles Ebuka Agbawodikeizu	CF	(England)	31 December 2007 (aged 17)	Free Agent	2024	—N/a	2026
39	Dajaune Brown	CF	(Jamaica)	16 October 2005 (aged 19)	Academy	2022	—N/a	2027
42	Johnson Osong	LW	(England)	19 May 2007 (aged 18)	Academy	2023	—N/a	2025
48	Lennon Wheeldon	CF	(England)	16 February 2006 (aged 19)	Academy	2022	—N/a	
Out on loan
5	Sonny Bradley	CB	(England)	13 September 1991 (aged 33)	Luton Town	2023	Free	2025
22	Tyrese Fornah	CM	(Sierra Leone)	11 September 1999 (aged 25)	Nottingham Forest	2023	Undisclosed	2025

== Transfers ==
=== In ===
Date	Pos.	Player	From	Fee	Ref
1 July 2024 (Note: The transfer was announced on 22 January, and would become official on 1 July once his Charlton Athletic contract expired)	LW	(England) Corey Blackett-Taylor	(England) Charlton Athletic	Free	
1 July 2024 (Note: The transfer was announced on 28 June, and would become official on 1 July once his Sheffield United contract expired)	CM	(England) Ben Osborn	(England) Sheffield United	Free	
2 July 2024	CF	(England) Kayden Jackson	(England) Ipswich Town	Free	
10 July 2024	CM	(Netherlands) Kenzo Goudmijn	(Netherlands) AZ Alkmaar	Undisclosed	
12 July 2024	CF	(England) Emmanuel Ilesanmi (Note: Signed initially for the Under-21s)	(England) Harrogate Town	Free	
12 July 2024	DM	(Norway) Morten Spencer	(England) Leeds United	Free	
12 July 2024	CM	(England) Alex Stepien-Iwumene	(England) Southampton	Free	
17 July 2024	CM	(The Gambia) Ebou Adams	(Wales) Cardiff City	Undisclosed	
26 July 2024	DM	(Republic of Ireland) Freddie Turley	(Republic of Ireland) Shamrock Rovers	Undisclosed	
7 August 2024	GK	(England) Rohan Luthra	(Wales) Cardiff City	Free	
16 August 2024	GK	(Sweden) Jacob Widell Zetterström	(Sweden) Djurgården	Undisclosed	
15 January 2025	CF	(Norway) Lars-Jørgen Salvesen	(Norway) Viking	Undisclosed	
28 January 2025	CB	(England) Matt Clarke	(England) Middlesbrough	Undisclosed	
1 February 2025	CB	(Norway) Sondre Langås	(Norway) Viking	Undisclosed	
20 February 2025	CF	(Jamaica) Kemar Roofe	Free Agent	—N/a	
7 March 2025	CM	(Republic of Ireland) Jeff Hendrick	Free Agent	—N/a	
28 March 2025	CB	(Netherlands) Erik Pieters	Free Agent	—N/a	

=== Out ===
Date	Pos.	Player	To	Fee	Ref.
3 January 2025	CB	(England) Ben Radcliffe	(England) Crawley Town	Undisclosed	
20 January 2025	CF	(Republic of Ireland) James Collins	(England) Lincoln City	Undisclosed	
31 January 2025	CB	(Republic of Ireland) Eiran Cashin	(England) Brighton & Hove Albion	Undisclosed	
25 February 2025	RB	(England) Ryan Bartley	(England) Gateshead	Undisclosed	

=== Loaned in ===
Date	Pos.	Player	From	Date until	Ref.
2 July 2024	CF	(England) Jerry Yates	(Wales) Swansea City	End of Season	
24 July 2024	DM	(England) David Ozoh	(England) Crystal Palace	End of Season	
26 August 2024	AM	(Zimbabwe) Tawanda Chirewa	(England) Wolverhampton Wanderers	13 January 2025 (Note: On 13 January, Chirewa's loan was terminated and he returned to Wolverhampton Wanderers)	
30 August 2024	AM	(Republic of Ireland) Marcus Harness	(England) Ipswich Town	End of Season	
30 August 2024	CB	(England) Nat Phillips	(England) Liverpool	End of Season	
3 February 2025	CM	(England) Harrison Armstrong	(England) Everton	End of Season	

=== Loaned out ===
Date	Pos.	Player	To	Date until	Ref.
1 July 2024	CF	(England) Tony Weston	(England) Boston United	End of Season (Note: On 8 January, Weston's loan at Boston United was extended until the end of the season)	
14 August 2024	CM	(Sierra Leone) Tyrese Fornah	(England) Salford City	End of Season	
17 August 2024	RB	(England) Ryan Bartley	(England) Spennymoor Town	14 September 2024	
20 August 2024	DM	(Northern Ireland) Darren Robinson	(England) Hartlepool United	25 October 2024 (Note: On 25 October, Robinson was recalled from his loan spell at Hartlepool United)	
6 September 2024	CB	(England) Ben Radcliffe	(England) Gateshead	1 January 2025	
11 October 2024	RB	(England) Ryan Bartley	(England) Hereford	2 January 2025 (Note: On 11 November, Bartley's loan at Hereford was extended until January)	
18 October 2024	LB	(England) Riley Moloney	(England) Barwell	15 November 2024	
20 October 2024	CB	(Wales) Dan Cox	(England) Enfield Town	20 November 2024	
30 October 2024	RB	(England) Max Bardell	(England) AFC Fylde	End of Season (Note: On 3 December, Bardell's loan at AFC Fylde was extended until the end of January. On 30 January it was further extended until the end of the season)	
11 November 2024	GK	(England) Josh Shattell	(England) Carlton Town	1 December 2024	
21 November 2024	CM	(England) Alex Stepien-Iwumene	(England) Eastleigh	16 January 2025	
23 November 2024	CF	(England) Lennon Wheeldon	(England) Boston United	1 January 2025	
5 December 2024	GK	(England) Josh Shattell	(England) Erith Town	28 December 2024	
6 December 2024	DM	(England) Harry Hawkins	(England) AFC Telford United	End of Season (Note: On 8 January, Hawkins' loan at AFC Telford United was extended until February. On 3 February it was extended by a further month. On 4 March it was extended until the end of the season)	
6 January 2025	CB	(England) Sonny Bradley	(England) Wycombe Wanderers	End of Season	
17 January 2025	RB	(England) Ryan Bartley	(England) Hereford	15 February 2025	
23 January 2025	CF	(England) Emmanuel Ilesanmi	(England) Torquay United	20 February 2025	
7 February 2025	CB	(England) Keilen Robinson	(England) Kidderminster Harriers	7 March 2025	
25 March 2025	CF	(England) Emmanuel Ilesanmi	(England) Torquay United	End of Season	
1 April 2025	GK	(England) Rohan Luthra	(England) Spennymoor Town	8 April 2025	

=== Released / Out of Contract ===
Date	Pos.	Player	Subsequent club	Join date	Ref.
30 June 2024	CM	(Republic of Ireland) Conor Hourihane	(England) Barnsley	1 July 2024	
30 June 2024	CF	(Republic of Ireland) Owen Oseni	(England) Gateshead	1 July 2024	
30 June 2024	CM	(England) Louie Sibley	(England) Oxford United	3 July 2024	
30 June 2024	AM	(Northern Ireland) Charlie Lindsay	(Northern Ireland) Glentoran	9 July 2024	
30 June 2024	GK	(England) Joe Wildsmith	(England) West Bromwich Albion	10 July 2024	
30 June 2024	CM	(England) Korey Smith	(England) Cambridge United	17 July 2024	
30 June 2024	RB	(England) Callum Moore	(England) Mickleover	9 August 2024	
30 June 2024	CM	(England) Jack Bates	(England) Worthing	23 August 2024	
30 June 2024	RM	(England) Alex Gibson-Hammond	(England) Hythe Town	10 September 2024	
30 June 2024	CF	(England) Dwight Gayle	(Scotland) Hibernian	12 September 2024	
30 June 2024	GK	(Wales) Lewis Ridd	(Northern Ireland) Cliftonville	20 September 2024	
30 June 2024	CF	(England) Martyn Waghorn	(England) Northampton Town	1 November 2024	
30 June 2024	RW	(England) Eno Nto	(England) Harrogate Town	12 November 2024	
30 June 2024	RW	(Gibraltar) Carlos Richards	(England) Dorking Wanderers	1 February 2025	
30 June 2024	CM	(England) Adebayo Fapetu			
30 June 2024	RB	(England) Kwaku Oduroh			
30 June 2024	CM	(England) Bradley Johnson	Retired		
30 June 2024	GK	(England) Scott Loach	Retired		
27 March 2025	DM	(Norway) Morten Spencer	Retired		

== Pre-season and friendlies ==
On 11 May, the club announced a return to Alicante for a weeks training camp and a friendly against Stockport County. Two days later, Derby announced they would travel to Matlock Town for the opening pre-season fixture. A third fixture was later added to the schedule, against Chesterfield. On 6 June, a visit to Shrewsbury Town was also confirmed. A fifth friendly was later announced, versus Barnsley. On 5 July, a sixth and final fixture was added, at home against Spanish La Liga side Real Valladolid.

Win Draw Loss Fixtures

12 July 2024 Friendly	Matlock Town	0–3	Derby County	Matlock
19:45 BST		Report	Jackson 24'; Yates 53'; L. Thompson 66'	Stadium: Causeway Lane

19 July 2024 Friendly	Stockport County	0–1	Derby County	San Pedro del Pinatar, Spain
11:00 CEST (10:00 BST)		Report	Bradley 90'	Stadium: Pinatar Arena

24 July 2024 Friendly	Chesterfield	4–0	Derby County	Chesterfield
19:30 BST	Banks 41'; Grigg 44'; Berry 76', 80'	Report		Stadium: SMH Group Stadium

27 July 2024 Friendly	Shrewsbury Town	2–1	Derby County	Shrewsbury
15:00 BST	O'Reilly 22'; Bloxham (?)	Report	Collins 29'	Stadium: New Meadow

31 July 2024 Friendly	Barnsley	4–3	Derby County	Barnsley
19:45 BST	Hourihane 17'; Phillips 70'; Lofthouse 75'; Marsh 89'	Report	Mendez-Laing 35', 58'; Collins 74'	Stadium: Oakwell

3 August 2024 Friendly	Derby County	2–1	Real Valladolid	Derby
15:00 BST	Ozoh 59'; Wilson 61'	Report	Moro 36'	Stadium: Pride Park Stadium; Attendance: 5,206

== Competitions ==
=== Overall record ===
Competition	Starting round	Final position	Record							
Competition	Starting round	Final position	Pld	W	D	L	GF	GA	GD	Win %
Championship	Matchday 1	19th	46	13	11	22	48	56	−8	28.26
FA Cup	Third round	Third round	1	0	1	0	1	1	+0	0.00
EFL Cup	First round	Second round	2	1	1	0	2	1	+1	50.00
Total			49	14	13	22	51	58	−7	28.57

Source: Soccerway

=== Championship ===
==== League table ====
Pos	Team	Pld	W	D	L	GF	GA	GD	Pts
17	Oxford United	46	13	14	19	49	65	−16	53
18	Stoke City	46	12	15	19	45	62	−17	51
19	Derby County	46	13	11	22	48	56	−8	50
20	Preston North End	46	10	20	16	48	59	−11	50
21	Hull City	46	12	13	21	44	54	−10	49

Source: English Football League
Rules for classification: 1) Points; 2) Goal difference; 3) Number of goals scored; 4) Head-to-head results; 5) Wins; 6) Away goals; 7) Penalty points (sec 9.5); 8) Number of 12-point sending off offences; 9) Play-off (only if needed to determine promotion/relegation)

==== Results summary ====
Overall								Home						Away					
Pld	W	D	L	GF	GA	GD	Pts	W	D	L	GF	GA	GD	W	D	L	GF	GA	GD
46	13	11	22	48	56	−8	50	9	5	9	25	18	+7	4	6	13	23	38	−15

Source: Soccerway

==== Results by round ====
Round	1	2	3	4	5	6	7	8	9	10	11	12	13	14	15	16	17	18	19	20	21	22	23	24	25	26	27	28	29	30	31	32	33	34	35	36	37	38	39	40	41	42	43	44	45	46
Ground	A	H	A	H	H	A	H	A	H	A	A	H	A	A	H	A	H	H	A	A	H	A	H	H	A	A	H	H	A	H	A	H	A	H	A	H	H	A	H	A	H	A	H	A	A	H
Result	L	W	L	W	W	L	L	L	W	D	D	D	L	W	D	D	L	L	L	D	W	L	W	L	L	L	L	L	L	L	D	D	L	L	L	W	W	W	W	L	D	D	L	W	W	D
Position	18	12	15	10	8	10	13	14	12	12	12	12	14	13	12	11	15	15	16	16	14	16	14	16	17	18	19	21	22	22	22	21	22	23	24	22	22	22	20	21	21	21	21	21	19	19
Points	0	3	3	6	9	9	9	9	12	13	14	15	15	18	19	20	20	20	20	21	24	24	27	27	27	27	27	27	27	27	28	29	29	29	29	32	35	38	41	41	42	43	43	46	49	50

Source: EFL
A = Away; H = Home; W = Win; D = Draw; L = Loss; P = Postponed

==== Matches ====
On 26 June, the Championship fixtures were announced.

Win Draw Loss Fixtures

9 August 2024 1	Blackburn Rovers	4–2	Derby County	Blackburn
20:00 BST	Dolan 19'; Weimann 72'; Szmodics 76'; Ohashi 84'	Report	Nelson 67'; Wilson 88'	Stadium: Ewood Park; Attendance: 17,975; Referee: Josh Smith

17 August 2024 2	Derby County	1–0	Middlesbrough	Derby
12:30 BST	Jackson 14'	Report		Stadium: Pride Park Stadium; Attendance: 29,443; Referee: Bobby Madley
Note: Fixture was initially scheduled for a 15:00 kick-off, but was moved for live Sky Sports broadcast.

24 August 2024 3	Watford	2–1	Derby County	Watford
15:00 BST	Bayo 31'; Sissoko 76'	Report	Adams 2'	Stadium: Vicarage Road; Attendance: 18,911; Referee: Geoff Eltringham

31 August 2024 4	Derby County	3–0	Bristol City	Derby
15:00 BST	Goudmijn 28'; Jackson 60'; Ozoh 89'	Report		Stadium: Pride Park Stadium; Attendance: 29,270; Referee: Tom Nield

14 September 2024 5	Derby County	1–0	Cardiff City	Derby
15:00 BST	Goudmijn 28'	Report		Stadium: Pride Park Stadium; Attendance: 28,985; Referee: Matt Donohue

21 September 2024 6	Sheffield United	1–0	Derby County	Sheffield
15:00 BST	Vinícius (yellow card) 38'; Hamer 53'; Ahmedhodžić (yellow card) 56'; Moore (yellow card) 86'	Report	Cashin (yellow card) 50'; Elder (yellow card) 80'	Stadium: Bramall Lane; Attendance: 28,685; Referee: Andy Madley

28 September 2024 7	Derby County	2–3	Norwich City	Derby
12:30 BST	Forsyth (yellow card) 21', (goal) 60'; Chirewa (yellow card) 77'; Goudmijn (yellow card) 79'; Blackett-Taylor 90+1'	Report	Duffy (yellow card) 24'; Sainz 45+3', 65', 87'; Córdoba (yellow card) 90+5'	Stadium: Pride Park Stadium; Attendance: 28,915; Referee: Oliver Langford
Note: Fixture was initially scheduled for a 15:00 kick-off, but was moved for live Sky Sports broadcast.

1 October 2024 8	Sunderland	2–0	Derby County	Sunderland
19:45 GMT	Cirkin (yellow card) 25'; Bellingham 40'; Isidor 55'; Mepham (yellow card) 59'	Report	Harness (yellow card) 36'; Goudmijn (yellow card) 89'	Stadium: Stadium of Light; Attendance: 39,017; Referee: Dean Whitestone

5 October 2024 9	Derby County	2–0	Queens Park Rangers	Derby
15:00 BST	Cashin (yellow card) 38'; Nelson 54'; Harness 55'	Report	Dunne (yellow card) 90+5'	Stadium: Pride Park Stadium; Attendance: 29,305; Referee: David Webb

19 October 2024 10	Millwall	1–1	Derby County	Bermondsey
15:00 BST	Bryan (yellow card) 37'; Ivanović 85'; Wintle (yellow card) 90'	Report	Yates 78'	Stadium: The Den; Attendance: 17,321; Referee: Stuart Attwell

22 October 2024 11	Oxford United	1–1	Derby County	Oxford
19:45 BST	Scarlett 12'; Goodrham (yellow card) 19'	Report	Osborn (yellow card) 38'; Elder (yellow card) 45+1'; Blackett-Taylor (yellow card) 50'; Yates (yellow card) 52'; Mendez-Laing 55'; Cashin (yellow card) 76'	Stadium: Kassam Stadium; Attendance: 11,423; Referee: Gavin Ward

26 October 2024 12	Derby County	1–1	Hull City	Derby
15:00 BST	Brown 66'; Forsyth (yellow card) 90+4'	Report	Simons 57', (yellow card) 72'; Hughes (yellow card) 77'; Burstow (yellow card) 90+1'; João Pedro (yellow card) 90+5'	Stadium: Pride Park Stadium; Attendance: 29,877; Referee: Tom Nield

2 November 2024 13	Stoke City	2–1	Derby County	Stoke-on-Trent
15:00 GMT	Cannon 9'; Moran (yellow card) 71'; Stevens (yellow card) 77'; Gibson 82'	Report	Harness (yellow card) 48'; Phillips (yellow card) 54'; Adams (yellow card) 79'; Johansson 88' (o.g.)	Stadium: Bet365 Stadium; Attendance: 24,511; Referee: Josh Smith
Note: Fixture was initially scheduled for a 15:00 kick-off, but was moved for live Sky Sports broadcast.

6 November 2024 14	Coventry City	1–2	Derby County	Coventry
19:45 GMT	Sakamoto 77'; Eccles (yellow card) 78'	Report	Yates 11'; Cashin (yellow card) 34'; Adams (yellow card) 59'; Thomas 73' (o.g.)	Stadium: Coventry Building Society Arena; Attendance: 27,243; Referee: Sam Allison

9 November 2024 15	Derby County	1–1	Plymouth Argyle	Derby
15:00 BST	Yates 8'; Jackson (yellow card) 57'	Report	Randell 41'; Bundu (yellow card) 42'; Sorinola (yellow card) 65'; Mumba (yellow card) 68'; Grimshaw (yellow card) 85'	Stadium: Pride Park Stadium; Attendance: 29,652; Referee: Simon Hooper

23 November 2024 16	Preston North End	1–1	Derby County	Preston
19:45 GMT	Greenwood 23', (yellow card) 62'; McCann (yellow card) 87'	Report	Yates 29'; Thompson (yellow card) 58'; Harness (yellow card) 90'	Stadium: Deepdale; Attendance: 16,646; Referee: David Webb

27 November 2024 17	Derby County	1–2	Swansea City	Derby
20:00 GMT	Elder (yellow card) 34'; Mendez-Laing 65' (pen.); Nelson (yellow card) 88'; Thompson (yellow card) 90+1'	Report	Vipotnik 2'; Ronald 14'; Peart-Harris (yellow card) 73'	Stadium: Pride Park Stadium; Attendance: 25,141; Referee: Ben Toner
Note: Fixture was initially scheduled for a 19:45 kick-off, but was moved for live Sky Sports broadcast.

1 December 2024 18	Derby County	1–2	Sheffield Wednesday	Derby
15:00 GMT	Adams 9', (yellow card) 37'; Harness (yellow card) 47'; Osborn (yellow card) 71'; Elder (yellow card) 85'; Jackson (yellow card) 90+5'	Report	Bannan (yellow card) 21', (goal) 64'; Lowe 90+4'	Stadium: Pride Park Stadium; Attendance: 29,212; Referee: John Busby
Note: Fixture was initially scheduled for 31 October, but was moved for live Sky Sports broadcast.

7 December 2024 19	Leeds United	2–0	Derby County	Leeds
12:30 GMT	Rodon 39'; Wöber 44'	Report	Jackson (yellow card) 15'	Stadium: Elland Road; Attendance: 36,468; Referee: Matt Donohue
Note: Fixture was initially scheduled for a 15:00 kick-off, but was moved for live Sky Sports broadcast.

10 December 2024 20	Burnley	0–0	Derby County	Burnley
19:45 GMT	Brownhill (yellow card) 80'	Report	Ward (yellow card) 48'; Zetterström (yellow card) 88'	Stadium: Turf Moor; Attendance: 18,813; Referee: Andy Davies

13 December 2024 21	Derby County	4–0	Portsmouth	Derby
20:00 GMT	Wilson 8'; Cashin 23'; Adams 29'; Pack 65' (o.g.)	Report	McIntyre (yellow card) 84'	Stadium: Pride Park Stadium; Attendance: 26,980; Referee: Oliver Langford
Note: Fixture was initially scheduled for 14 December, but was moved for live Sky Sports broadcast.

20 December 2024 22	Luton Town	2–1	Derby County	Luton
20:00 GMT	Andersen (yellow card) 37'; Holmes 89'; Morris 90+2'	Report	Phillips (yellow card) 41'; Jackson 58'; Elder (yellow card) 67'; Nelson (yellow card) 89'	Stadium: Kenilworth Road; Attendance: 11,667; Referee: Andrew Kitchen
Note: Fixture was initially scheduled for 21 December, but was moved for live Sky Sports broadcast.

26 December 2024 23	Derby County	2–1	West Bromwich Albion	Derby
17:30 GMT	Yates 28'; Holgate 68' (o.g.); Adams (yellow card) 90+5'	Report	Fellows (yellow card) 40'; Diangana 81'	Stadium: Pride Park Stadium; Attendance: 31,267; Referee: Jarred Gillett
Note: Fixture was initially scheduled for a 15:00 kick-off, but was moved for live Sky Sports broadcast.

29 December 2024 24	Derby County	0–1	Leeds United	Derby
15:00 GMT	Harness (yellow card) 32'	Report	Ampadu (yellow card) 68'; Aaronson 79'	Stadium: Pride Park Stadium; Attendance: 32,240; Referee: Andy Davies
Note: Fixture was initially scheduled for a 15:00 kick-off, but was moved for live Sky Sports broadcast.

1 January 2025 25	Sheffield Wednesday	4–2	Derby County	Sheffield
15:00 GMT	Bannan 8'; Windass 61'; Gassama 63'; Musaba 74'; Charles (yellow card) 85'	Report	Adams (yellow card) 32', (goal) 90+1'; Goudmijn (yellow card) 34'; Yates 68'	Stadium: Hillsborough Stadium; Attendance: 31,056; Referee: Lewis Smith

4 January 2025 26	Bristol City	1–0	Derby County	Bristol
15:00 GMT	McNally 19'; Mehmeti (yellow card) 28'; McCrorie (yellow card) 35'; Roberts (yellow card) 90+2'	Report	Thompson (yellow card) 45+2'	Stadium: Ashton Gate; Attendance: 22,040; Referee: Will Finnie

18 January 2025 27	Derby County	0–2	Watford	Derby
15:00 GMT	Elder (yellow card) 19'	Report	Abankwah (yellow card) 1'; Louza 4'; Ngakia (yellow card) 31'; Kayembe 66'; Sierralta (yellow card) 90+1'	Stadium: Pride Park Stadium; Attendance: 29,040; Referee: Adam Herczeg

21 January 2025 28	Derby County	0–1	Sunderland	Derby
19:45 GMT	Harness (yellow card) 50'	Report	Mayenda 28'; Bellingham (yellow card) 33'	Stadium: Pride Park Stadium; Attendance: 27,441; Referee: Sam Allison

25 January 2025 29	Cardiff City	2–1	Derby County	Cardiff
15:00 GMT	Chambers (yellow card) 45+4'; Ng (yellow card) 59'; Robinson 62'; El Ghazi 64'	Report	Salvesen 70'; Elder (yellow card) 75'	Stadium: Cardiff City Stadium; Attendance: 19,548; Referee: Dean Whitestone

1 February 2025 30	Derby County	0–1	Sheffield United	Derby
15:00 GMT	Harness (yellow card) 70'	Report	Brereton 49'; Vinícius Souza (yellow card) 70'	Stadium: Pride Park Stadium; Attendance: 29,472; Referee: Tom Nield

8 February 2025 31	Norwich City	1–1	Derby County	Norwich
15:00 GMT	Fisher (yellow card) 29'; Sargent 68'; Doyle (yellow card) 90+3'	Report	Ebou Adams (yellow card) 27'; Phillips (yellow card) 59'; Yates 90+2' (pen.)	Stadium: Carrow Road; Attendance: 26,584; Referee: Ruebyn Ricardo

11 February 2025 32	Derby County	0–0	Oxford United	Derby
19:45 GMT	Harness (yellow card) 90+1'	Report		Stadium: Pride Park Stadium; Attendance: 25,999; Referee: Stephen Martin

14 February 2025 33	Queens Park Rangers	4–0	Derby County	Shepherd's Bush
20:00 GMT	Chair 21', 57'; Saitō 35'; Edwards 66'	Report	Mendez-Laing (yellow card) 65'; Jackson (yellow card) 90+4'	Stadium: Loftus Road; Attendance: 16,591; Referee: David Webb
Note: Fixture was initially scheduled for 15 February, but was moved for live Sky Sports broadcasting.

22 February 2025 34	Derby County	0–1	Millwall	Derby
12:30 GMT	Goudmijn (yellow card) 44'; Nyambe (yellow card) 54'	Report	Coburn (penalty missed) 83', 90+5'	Stadium: Pride Park Stadium; Attendance: 28,321; Referee: Elliot Bell
Note: Fixture was initially scheduled for a 15:00 kick-off, but was moved for live Sky Sports broadcasting.

1 March 2025 35	Middlesbrough	1–0	Derby County	Middlesbrough
15:00 GMT	Azaz 80', (yellow card) 81'	Report	Barkhuizen (yellow card) 19'; Forsyth (yellow card) 90+4'	Stadium: Riverside Stadium; Attendance: 25,839; Referee: Gavin Ward

8 March 2025 36	Derby County	2–1	Blackburn Rovers	Derby
15:00 GMT	Forsyth 3'; Adams 7'	Report	Gueye 40'	Stadium: Pride Park Stadium; Attendance: 29,753; Referee: Andrew Kitchen

11 March 2025 37	Derby County	2–0	Coventry City	Derby
19:45 GMT	Clarke 23'; Armstrong (yellow card) 28'; Harness 48', (yellow card) 54'	Report	Bidwell (yellow card) 46'	Stadium: Pride Park Stadium; Attendance: 28,879; Referee: Sam Allison

15 March 2025 38	Plymouth Argyle	2–3	Derby County	Plymouth
15:00 GMT	Bundu 38'; Phillips 46' (o.g.)	Report	Harness 11'; Armstrong 26'; Phillips (yellow card) 45+5'; Thompson (yellow card) 58'; Adams (yellow card) 80'; Harness 88'	Stadium: Home Park; Attendance: 16978; Referee: John Busby

2 April 2025 39	Derby County	2–0	Preston North End	Derby
19:45 GMT	Thompson (yellow card) 15'; Forsyth 48'; Yates 52'	Report	Brady (yellow card) 72'; Frøkjær-Jensen (yellow card) 90'	Stadium: Pride Park Stadium; Attendance: 26,014; Referee: Stephen Martin
Note: Match was originally scheduled for 29 March but was rescheduled due to Preston's participation in the FA Cup Quarter-finals.

5 April 2025 40	Swansea City	1–0	Derby County	Swansea
15:00 BST	Eom Ji-sung 79'	Report	Forsyth (yellow card) 67'; Harness (yellow card) 82'	Stadium: Swansea.com Stadium; Attendance: 16,501; Referee: Andy Davies

8 April 2025 41	Derby County	0–0	Burnley	Derby
19:45 BST	Langås (yellow card) 33'; Adams (yellow card) 90+3'	Report		Stadium: Pride Park Stadium; Attendance: 27,584; Referee: Bobby Madley
Note: Match was initially scheduled for 9 April but was rescheduled after Burnley's subsequent fixture was moved to 11 April for live TV coverage.

12 April 2025 42	Portsmouth	2–2	Derby County	Portsmouth
15:00 BST	Bishop (penalty missed) 7', (yellow card) 69'; Swanson (yellow card) 27'; Hayden (yellow card) 33'; Saydee (yellow card) 68'; Atkinson 71', 90+1', (yellow card) 80'	Report	Zetterström (yellow card) 6'; Clarke (yellow card) 21'; Mendez-Laing (yellow card) 34'; Adams (yellow card) 57'; Yates 70'; Atkinson 75' (o.g.)	Stadium: Fratton Park; Attendance: 20,412; Referee: Ruebyn Ricardo

18 April 2025 43	Derby County	0–1	Luton Town	Derby
12:30 BST	Langås (yellow card) 29'; Jackson (yellow card) 90+5'	Report	Alli 10', (yellow card) 68'; Morris (yellow card) 38'	Stadium: Pride Park Stadium; Attendance: 32,159; Referee: James Linington
Note: Fixture was initially scheduled for a 15:00 kick-off, but was moved for live Sky Sports broadcasting.

21 April 2025 44	West Bromwich Albion	1–3	Derby County	West Bromwich
15:00 BST	Fellows (yellow card) 53'; Armstrong 70'	Report	Adams 7'; Harness (yellow card) 10'; Yates 30'; Mendez-Laing 87'; Phillips (yellow card) 90+4'	Stadium: The Hawthorns; Attendance: 25,750; Referee: Gavin Ward

26 April 2025 45	Hull City	0–1	Derby County	Kingston upon Hull
15:00 BST		Report	Phillips 84'	Stadium: MKM Stadium; Attendance: 24,451; Referee: Stephen Martin

3 May 2025 46	Derby County	0–0	Stoke City	Derby
12:30 BST	Adams (yellow card) 60'; Thompson (yellow card) 79'	Report	Al-Hamadi (yellow card) 29'	Stadium: Pride Park Stadium; Attendance: 32,471; Referee: Oliver Langford
Note: Fixture was initially scheduled for a 15:00 kick-off, but all EFL Championship final matchday fixtures were moved to an earlier kick-off.

=== FA Cup ===
Derby County entered the FA Cup at the third round stage, and were drawn away to Leyton Orient.

Win Draw Loss Fixtures

14 January 2025 Third round	Leyton Orient	1–1 (a.e.t.) (6–5 p)	Derby County	Leyton
19:45 GMT	Kelman 20'; Pratley (yellow card) 43'; Donley (yellow card) 74'; Clare (yellow card) 90+2' (yellow-red card) 113'	Report	Brown 24'; Adams (yellow card) 84'	Stadium: Brisbane Road; Attendance: 8,279; Referee: Ben Speedie
	Penalties
	Donley (penalty scored); James (penalty scored); Brown (penalty scored); Cooper (penalty scored); Kelman (penalty scored); Obiero (penalty scored)		Collins (penalty scored); Goudmijn (penalty scored); Harness (penalty scored); Jackson (penalty scored); Barkhuizen (penalty scored); Elder (penalty missed)
Note: Fixture was initially scheduled for 11 January, but was postponed and rearranged for three days later due to a frozen pitch.

=== EFL Cup ===
On 27 June, the draw for the first round was made, with Derby being drawn at home against Chesterfield. In the second round, they were drawn away to Barrow.

Win Draw Loss Fixtures

13 August 2024 First round	Derby County	2–1	Chesterfield	Derby
19:45 BST	Thompson 38'; Jackson 68'	Report	Dobra 29'	Stadium: Pride Park Stadium; Attendance: 8,538; Referee: Leigh Doughty

27 August 2024 Second round	Barrow	0–0 (3–2 p)	Derby County	Barrow-in-Furness
19:45 BST		Report		Stadium: Holker Street; Attendance: 3,003; Referee: Seb Stockbridge
	Penalties
	B. Jackson (penalty scored); Gotts (penalty scored); Worrall (penalty scored); Spence (penalty missed)		Collins (penalty missed); Mendez-Laing (penalty scored); Brown (penalty scored); K. Jackson (penalty missed); Forsyth (penalty missed)

== Statistics ==
=== Appearances and goals ===
As of match played 3 May 2025

Players with no appearances are not included on the list
Italics indicate a loaned in player

No.	Pos	Nat	Player	Total		Championship		FA Cup		EFL Cup	
No.	Pos	Nat	Player	Apps	Goals	Apps	Goals	Apps	Goals	Apps	Goals
1	GK	(Sweden) SWE	Jacob Widell Zetterström	42	0	40+0	0	1+0	0	1+0	0
2	DF	(England) ENG	Kane Wilson	35	2	26+7	2	1+0	0	1+0	0
3	DF	(Scotland) SCO	Craig Forsyth	42	3	26+13	3	1+0	0	2+0	0
4	MF	(England) ENG	David Ozoh	12	1	9+1	1	0+0	0	1+1	0
5	DF	(England) ENG	Sonny Bradley	9	0	3+4	0	0+0	0	2+0	0
6	DF	(Norway) NOR	Sondre Langås	14	0	13+1	0	0+0	0	0+0	0
7	FW	(England) ENG	Tom Barkhuizen	22	0	2+17	0	0+1	0	2+0	0
8	MF	(England) ENG	Ben Osborn	26	0	18+7	0	0+0	0	0+1	0
9	FW	(Jamaica) JAM	Kemar Roofe	3	0	0+3	0	0+0	0	0+0	0
10	FW	(England) ENG	Jerry Yates	42	10	40+2	10	0+0	0	0+0	0
11	FW	(Guatemala) GUA	Nathaniel Mendez-Laing	44	3	26+15	3	1+0	0	0+2	0
12	DF	(England) ENG	Nat Phillips	33	1	24+8	1	1+0	0	0+0	0
15	FW	(Norway) NOR	Lars-Jørgen Salvesen	8	1	6+2	1	0+0	0	0+0	0
16	MF	(England) ENG	Liam Thompson	31	1	18+10	0	1+0	0	2+0	1
17	MF	(Netherlands) NED	Kenzo Goudmijn	44	2	29+12	2	1+0	0	2+0	0
18	MF	(Republic of Ireland) IRL	Marcus Harness	42	4	26+15	4	1+0	0	0+0	0
19	FW	(England) ENG	Kayden Jackson	49	4	28+18	3	0+1	0	0+2	1
20	DF	(Australia) AUS	Callum Elder	30	0	24+5	0	0+1	0	0+0	0
22	MF	(Sierra Leone) SLE	Tyrese Fornah	1	0	0+1	0	0+0	0	0+0	0
23	MF	(England) ENG	Joe Ward	8	0	2+5	0	0+0	0	1+0	0
24	DF	(Namibia) NAM	Ryan Nyambe	19	0	14+3	0	0+0	0	1+1	0
25	DF	(England) ENG	Matthew Clarke	16	1	15+1	1	0+0	0	0+0	0
27	FW	(England) ENG	Corey Blackett-Taylor	13	1	4+8	1	1+0	0	0+0	0
28	MF	(England) ENG	Harrison Armstrong	15	1	12+3	1	0+0	0	0+0	0
31	GK	(England) ENG	Josh Vickers	7	0	6+0	0	0+0	0	1+0	0
32	MF	(The Gambia) GAM	Ebou Adams	46	6	42+2	6	0+1	0	1+0	0
33	DF	(Netherlands) NED	Erik Pieters	1	0	0+1	0	0+0	0	0+0	0
35	DF	(England) ENG	Curtis Nelson	30	2	27+0	2	1+0	0	1+1	0
39	FW	(Jamaica) JAM	Dajaune Brown	18	2	3+12	1	1+0	1	1+1	0
48	FW	(England) ENG	Lennon Wheeldon	1	0	0+1	0	0+0	0	0+0	0
Player(s) who featured whilst on loan but returned to parent club during the season:
28	MF	(Zimbabwe) ZIM	Tawanda Chirewa	6	0	1+4	0	0+0	0	1+0	0
Player(s) who featured but departed the club permanently during the season:
6	DF	(Republic of Ireland) IRL	Eiran Cashin	22	1	21+0	1	0+0	0	1+0	0
9	FW	(Republic of Ireland) IRL	James Collins	20	0	1+16	0	0+1	0	1+1	0

== End-of-season awards ==
Award	Player
Jack Stamps Player of the Year	Ebou Adams
Men's Players' Player of the Year	Ebou Adams
Sammy Crooks Young Player of the Year	Liam Thompson
Academy Player of the Year	Tom Marriott
Scholar of the Year	Luke Banks
Goal of the Season	Jerry Yates v Plymouth Argyle on 9.11.2024
Save of the Season	Josh Vickers v West Bromwich Albion on 21.04.2025
Brian Clough Award (Outstanding off-field contribution)	Clare Morris
