= Mount Albert Grammar School =

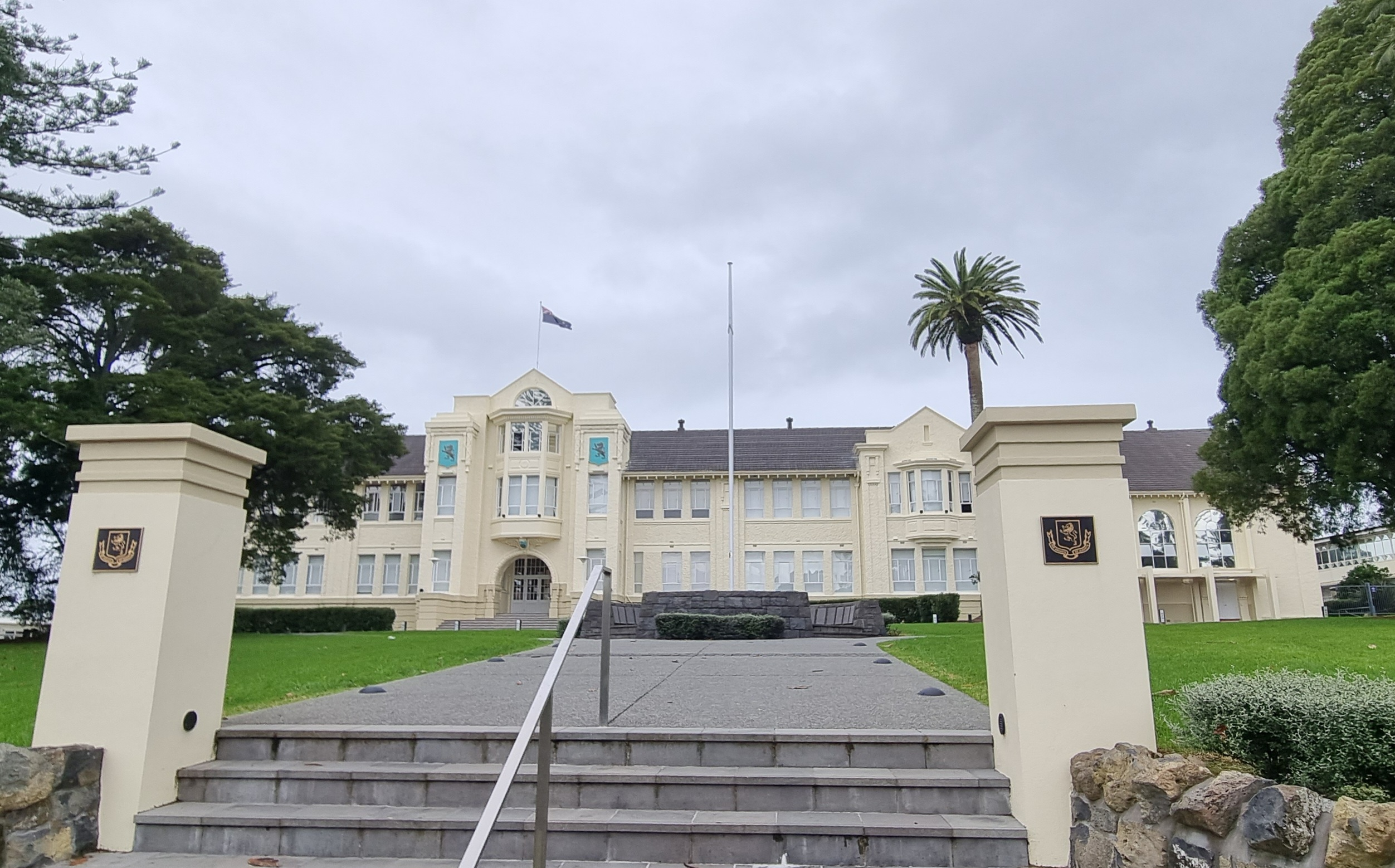

Location
- 36 Alberton Avenue; Auckland, 1025; New Zealand; 36°53′4.52″S 174°43′31.2″E

Information
- Type: State secondary, day and boarding
- Motto: Latin: Per Angusta Ad Augusta (Through Hardship to Glory)
- Established: 1922; 104 years ago
- Ministry of Education Institution no.: 69
- Headmaster: Patrick Drumm
- Grades: 9–13
- Gender: Coeducational
- Enrolment: 3,625 (July 2026)
- Socio-economic decile: 7 (2015)
- Alumni name: Albertians
- Website: mags.school.nz

Mount Albert Grammar School, commonly known as MAGS, is a co-educational state secondary school in Mount Albert in Auckland, New Zealand. It teaches students in year levels 9 to 13. As of March 2026, Mount Albert Grammar School is the second largest school in New Zealand, behind Rangitoto College.

== History ==
Mount Albert Grammar was founded in 1922 as a subsidiary of Auckland Grammar School, but now the two schools are governed separately. Mount Albert Grammar School was originally boys only, but became co-educational in 2000. Junior classes (years 9 and 10) are mostly single-sex while senior classes (years 11 to 13) are all co-educational. The School's Latin motto is Per Angusta Ad Augusta, which means "Through Hardship to Glory". The school hymn, sung at all formal assemblies, was written by a student, J. A. W. Bennett, in 1928.

There have been a number of headmasters since the opening of the school, Frederick Gamble (1922–1946), William Caradus (1946–1954), Murray Nairn (1954–1969), Maurice Hall (1970–1988), Gregory Taylor (1988–2006, the first Albertian to become Headmaster), Dale Burden (2006–2015), and the current headmaster, Patrick Drumm (2016–).

The school's hall was opened on 11 March 1926 by Sir James Parr after construction during 1925.

After the opening of the school, a need for boarding accommodation for students became apparent. In 1927, the Mount Albert Grammar School Hostel opened for boarders at 807 New North Road. This hostel closed in 1970 and a new one was opened in 1971, built on one of the school's playing fields. This is a boys' boarding hostel called School House. It has full-time accommodation for up to 105 students during school terms.

During the Great Depression, the school introduced an agricultural course for familiar who could not afford four years of professional education. The school purchased 20 acres of the Kerr Taylor estate near Alberton with the help of a donation from the Auckland Savings Bank, and established a farm for students in February 1933.

In 1989, the school underwent major reforms under principal Greg Taylor, including the abolition of corporal punishment and the introduction of women teachers. Taylor employed support staff for Pasifika students, who increasingly made up a large proportion of the school in the 1980s.

In the year 2000, the school became coeducational, allowing girls to attend.

In October 2015, an email containing a pornographic image was sent to all the school's 2,700 students after the school's email database was reportedly hacked by one of the school's students. The email database was immediately shut down and an investigation was started into who was responsible. The school laid a complaint with police and sought the assistance of the Department of Internal Affairs.

The school purchased what was meant to be a girls' hostel, but due to the Auckland housing crisis turned into accommodation for teachers as well as being a girls' hostel. The complex is located 6 minute walk away from MAGS on Lloyd Avenue.

On 24 July 2020, Prime Minister Jacinda Ardern officially opened the school's new science block, known as CS block and honouring the school's second headmaster, William Caradus. This was set to take place on March 24, however was postponed due to the COVID-19 pandemic. The block has been in use since classes commenced for the 2020 school year.

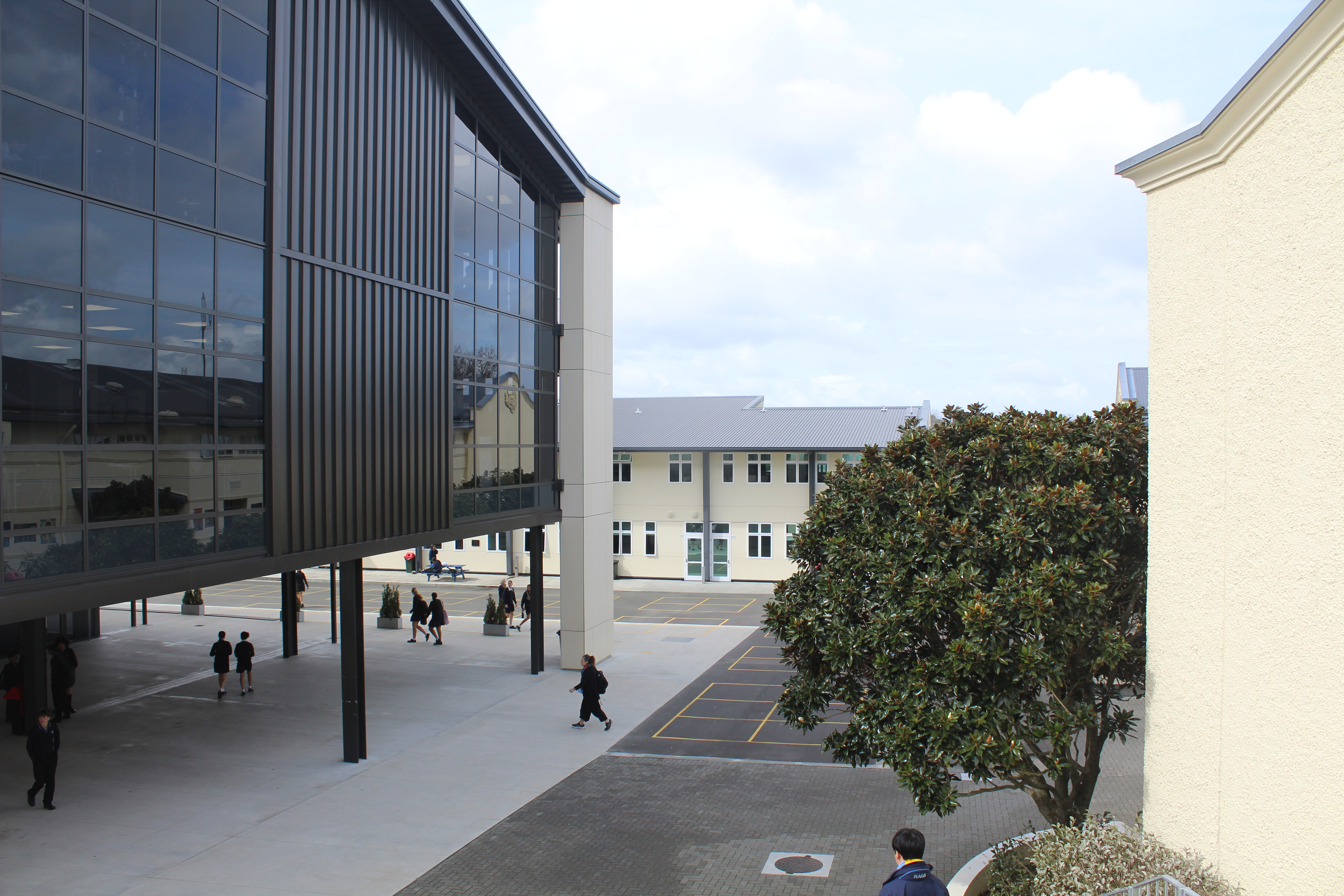
View of the Nairn block (left) and its surrounding courtyard

In 2024, construction finished on the new MN block, named after MAGS' third headmaster, Murray Nairn. The three-story building received a dawn blessing on 3 May 2024, and was subsequently opened by National MP Melissa Lee on 27 June of the same year. Designed by ASC Architects, the MN block houses sixteen social sciences classrooms, as well a specialised room to be used by the school's Māori unit, Te Puna o Wairaka. The entire ground floor is used as the school's library.

== Academia ==
Mount Albert Grammar School pupils participate in various forms of academia, from year 9 to year 13.

In 2015, 93.8 percent of students leaving Mount Albert Grammar held at least NCEA Level 1, 87.7 percent held at least NCEA Level 2, and 67.8 percent held at least NCEA Level 3. This is compared to 88.4%, 79.1%, and 52.8% respectively for all students nationally.

== Sports ==
In 2007 and 2009, MAGS won all the major Auckland titles in rugby, association football and netball. The First XI girls football and the Premier Girls Basketball also won their first Auckland Championships in 2009.

In 2008, one sports staff member and a parent coach were suspended by the schools' sport body College Sport and nine students who had transferred to the school were prevented from playing by rules designed to prevent poaching of young players. As a result, the school implemented a sporting Code of Conduct for all students, staff and coaches. This ultimately led to the dismissal of Director of Football, Kevin Fallon.

== Culture and Arts ==
Mount Albert Grammar School is involved in many cultural activities, with their curriculum including music, dance, drama, and visual arts courses. In recent years, their boys' and girls' choirs have had success in regional and national choral competitions, receiving awards at the Big Sing Auckland Regional Festival in 2025. In 2026, their boys' Centennial Choir was announced as a finalist for the national Big Sing, held in Christchurch.

MAGS has its own school hymn, 'Dusk on the Walls', which is sung at all formal school assemblies, normally accompanied by live piano. It was written by MAGS student Jack A. W. Bennett in 1928. The lyrics to the hymn were analysed in a report written by Brian Murphy, the School Archivist.

Also within the cultural pillar is the school's Māori unit, Te Puna o Owairaka, made up of students from all year levels. The unit focuses on strengthening traditions among Māori students through the teaching of te reo Māori, kapa haka, and waiata.

== Mt Albert Aquatic Centre ==
The Mt Albert Aquatic Centre was developed as a joint project between Mount Albert Grammar School and the Auckland City Council. It was officially opened by the Prime Minister of New Zealand in 1998. The facility contains a 25-metre competition pool with depths measuring from 1.2 metres to 3 metres, and a leisure pool that features wave motion and a water slide. The complex consists of other features visited by the public often. However, in 2016 the pool was noted to be unsafe due to its vulnerability to earthquakes. The pool is set to be either fixed or demolished in the next ten years.

== Mount Albert Grammar School Farm ==
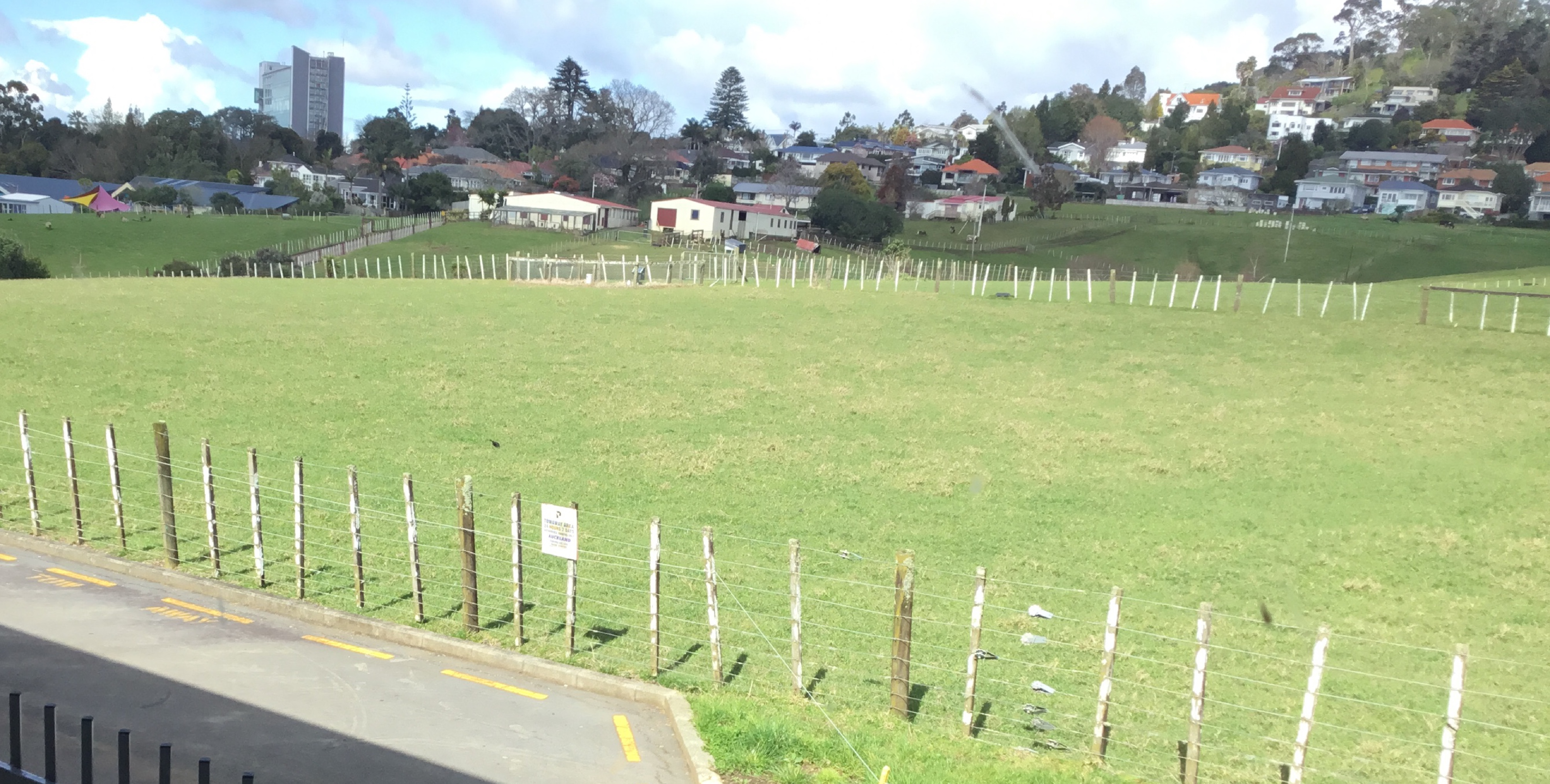
This is a photo of the Mount Albert Grammar School Farm as seen from the upper floor of MH Block, formerly known as D Block.

Since 1933, Mount Albert Grammar School has a 10.8-hectare (27-acre) farm adjacent to its school site in the middle of Auckland city. It is a fully working model farm, home to sheep, pigs, rabbits, cattle and poultry, cared for by a farm manager who lives on site. The land was owned by the ASB Bank, which leased the farm for 1 dollar every year until 2022, when ASB gifted the farm to the school.

== Observatory ==
The school is one of a few schools in New Zealand with an active observatory and possesses a telescope open to students and the public occasionally. Completed in 2008, the observatory has a Meade Instruments LX200R 12-inch Schmidt-Cassegrain f/10 telescope. The observatory uses an SBIG ST7XME CCD camera for imaging and photometry.

The observatory is used for both school education and amateur research.

== ERO report ==
In 2018, the New Zealand Education Review Office carried out a survey, finding that the school uses National Certificate of Educational Achievement and celebrates its students achievements through the Lion Awards programme. Its educational achievement level is above the national average, making Mt Albert Grammar one of the top seven schools in the country. The ethnic minorities of the school have shifted the balance since the 2015 review. By that, 91% of Māori and 85% of Pasifika students gained NCEA Level 2 in 2017.

== Demographics ==
As of 2018, the school enrolls 2,991 students, out of which 57% are male and 43% are female. Out of those, 40% are of European descent, 23% are Asian, 19% are identified as Pasifika, 3% are MELAA (Middle Eastern, Latin American, and African) and 2% are of other ethnicity.

== Notable alumni ==
Notable alumni include:

=== Academia ===
- Michael Bassett, QSO, NZ Medal – former senior lecturer in history at the University of Auckland 1964–1978. J B Smallman Professor of History at the University of Western Ontario 1992–1993. Former MP and Cabinet Minister
- J.A.W. (Jack) Bennett – former Chair of Medieval and Renaissance English at Cambridge University, 1964–1978. Fellow of the British Academy 1971. He is known for writing the school's historic hymn 'Dusk on the Walls'
- Graeme Davies, KBE – former Vice-Chancellor of three universities: the University of London, the University of Glasgow, and the University of Liverpool
- Peter C. B. Phillips – Professor of Economics at Yale University
- Keith Sinclair – New Zealand historian

=== Art ===
- Len Castle – potter
- Peter Siddell – painter
- Professor C. K. Stead ONZ CBE – poet, novelist and literary critic

=== Entertainment ===
- Liam Thompson – YouTube personality

=== Government ===
- Alan Bollard – Former Governor of the Reserve Bank of New Zealand
- Chris Liddell – Former Chief Financial Officer at both Microsoft and General Motors. Former White House Deputy Chief of Staff during the first Trump administration
- Robert Muldoon – Prime Minister of New Zealand 1975 – 1984

=== Industry ===
- Woolf Fisher – Co-Founder of Fisher & Paykel

=== Sports ===
- Michael Boxall – 2008 Summer Olympics participant and former member of New Zealand U-23 football team
- Caleb Clarke – All Black
- Jack Goodhue – All Blacks player, also plays for the Canterbury Crusaders and has represented New Zealand in Rugby Sevens and Under 20s
- Kai Kara-France – mixed martial artist, UFC Flyweight division
- Les Mills – Former Mayor of Auckland and athlete. Represented New Zealand at Olympic Games and Commonwealth Games over two decades
- Peter Snell – Olympic gold medalist – Athletics
- Bryan Williams – Former All Blacks player
- Sonny Bill Williams – rugby league player for the Sydney Roosters, Represented New Zealand national rugby league team, All Blacks and is a heavyweight boxer
- Portia Woodman – New Zealand women's national rugby union team (sevens)

== See also ==
- List of schools in New Zealand
- List of schools in the Auckland region
