= Curtis Nelson =

English footballer

Personal information
- Full name: Curtis Alexander Nelson
- Date of birth: 21 May 1993 (age 33)
- Place of birth: Newcastle-under-Lyme, England
- Height: 6 ft 0 in (1.83 m)
- Position: Centre back

Team information
- Current team: Milton Keynes Dons
- Number: 35

Youth career
- 2002–2008: Stoke City
- 2008–2009: Plymouth Argyle

Senior career*
Years	Team	Apps	(Gls)
2009–2016	Plymouth Argyle	211	(8)
2016–2019	Oxford United	99	(7)
2019–2023	Cardiff City	116	(2)
2023	Blackpool	18	(1)
2023–2026	Derby County	75	(4)
2026–	Milton Keynes Dons	18	(2)

International career
2011	England U18	1	(0)
- * Club domestic league appearances and goals as of 2 May 2026 (UTC)

Curtis Alexander Nelson (born 21 May 1993) is an English professional footballer who plays as a centre back for EFL League Two club Milton Keynes Dons.

He has also played in the English Football League for Derby County, Plymouth Argyle, Oxford United, Cardiff City and Blackpool. Nelson made his debut in the Football League in 2010. He was capped by England at under-18 level.

== Early and personal life ==
Nelson was born in Newcastle-under-Lyme, Staffordshire. He is mixed-race, of Jamaican descent through her paternal grandparents. He is a cousin of sprinters Ashleigh and Alexander Nelson and his younger brother Wes appeared in series 4 of the reality TV show Love Island in 2018.

== Career ==
=== Plymouth Argyle ===
Nelson spent seven years with Stoke City as a schoolboy before being released in February 2009. He joined Plymouth Argyle two months later. His performances in the 2009–10 season for the youth team and reserves, in both defence and midfield, earned him a place in the first-team squad for the club's final match of the campaign against Peterborough United. Nelson trained with the first team during throughout their 2010–11 pre-season and impressed manager Peter Reid. "I was very impressed with young Curtis," said Reid. "I like young players and he will be training with us all the time now. He played centre-back last year but he can play midfield as well." He made his first-team debut on 10 August 2010 in the League Cup against Notts County, replacing Anton Peterlin as a second-half substitute.

He signed his first professional contract in October 2010, one that would last until the end of the 2011–12 season. His performances for Argyle led to a call-up to the England under-18 team to play Italy in April 2011. He replaced George Moncur in the second half as England drew 1–1. Nelson appeared in 35 league matches during his debut season and three more in cup competitions. He finished the season by winning the club's Young Player of the Year award. Nelson began the new season in the team, but lost his place in November after the club signed Maxime Blanchard and Darren Purse. A knee injury in December meant a lengthy spell on the sidelines and new manager Carl Fletcher stressed that it was important Nelson took as long as he needed to make a full recovery.

Nelson signed a new undisclosed contract in April 2012, along with teammates Luke Young and Jared Sims. Nelson finished the season with 21 appearances in all competitions. He scored his first senior goal in a win against Northampton Town in September. "I ran over to the fans to celebrate, but I didn't know what to do," said Nelson. In April 2013, he became the youngest Plymouth Argyle captain since Norman Piper in August 1967 when he led the team in a win against Cheltenham Town. "It was a great honour. To be the captain at such a young age, I wasn't expecting it at all." Nelson made 32 appearances in the 2012–13 campaign and scored three goals. On 7 May 2014, Nelson committed to the Pilgrims by signing a new two-year contract with the club.

=== Oxford United ===
On 4 July 2016, Nelson signed for newly promoted League One club Oxford United on a two-year contract, later extended by a year. An independent transfer tribunal was required as Nelson was an academy graduate aged under 24 and the two clubs were unable to agree a fee. The tribunal ruled a fee of £200,000 was payable with an additional £80,000 depending on appearances. Before the start of his second season at the club, following the departure of John Lundstram, he was appointed team captain. He suffered a ruptured Achilles tendon during a home defeat to Northampton Town in November 2017 and was ruled out for the remainder of the season, teammate John Mousinho replacing him as captain. Nelson returned, earlier than expected, to the first team as a substitute on 14 April 2018 was immediately handed the captain's armband, though Mousinho later took the armband permanently. Nelson declined a contract renewal and left Oxford after the 2018–19 season, having appeared 121 times in all competitions, scoring 8 times, in his three seasons with the club.

=== Cardiff City ===
Nelson signed for newly relegated Championship club Cardiff City on 27 June 2019 on a free transfer on a two-year contract. He made his debut as a substitute in place of Marlon Pack during a 3–0 defeat to Reading. He scored his first goal for Cardiff on 2 November 2019 in a 4–2 win against Birmingham City.

Nelson signed a two-year extension on his contract on 7 September 2020, keeping him in the Welsh capital till 2023.

=== Blackpool ===
On 28 January 2023, Nelson signed for Championship side Blackpool on a deal until the end of the season after leaving Cardiff by mutual consent. He scored his first goal for the club on 14 March 2023 in a 6–1 win against Queens Park Rangers.

=== Derby County ===
On 23 June 2023, free agent Nelson signed a two-year deal with Derby County, becoming manager Paul Warne's fourth summer signing. He made his Derby debut on 5 August against Wigan Athletic. He scored his first goal for the club in a 1–1 draw at Cheltenham Town on 7 October. Nelson and his central defensive partner Eiran Cashin were one of the strongest and most reliable defensive partnerships in League One during the 2023–24 season, as their relationship and trust in each other showed on the field. Nelson played in every single minute of Derby's 46 League One matches, the only outfield player in the league to do so. He featured in a defence which kept 22 clean sheets and conceded the fewest goals in the League at just 37. These performances helped Derby finish runners-up in the division and earn automatic promotion to the Championship. Nelson also won the club's Jack Stamps Trophy as Derby's Player of the Year, with the defender making 51 appearances in total for the club during the season with two goals.

Nelson had added competition in the central defensive role at Derby for the 2024–25 season with Liverpool loanee Nat Phillips, Nelson still retained his place in the starting 11 and was one Derby's top performers in the clubs opening nine matches back in the Championship, scoring two goals with a bullet header in a 2–0 win over QPR on 5 October 2024 being the pick of these. His reputation for being a solid, reliable central defender who makes minimal mistakes was maintained in spite of the higher level of opposition shown in the Championship. On 14 November 2024, Nelson signed a one-year extension to his Derby contract, to extend his stay at Derby until June 2026. After featuring in Derby's first 27 league matches of the season, he was ruled out for the remainder of the season after sustaining a knee ligament injury, this ended a run of 73 consecutive league full-90 minute appearances since joining the club in 2023.

In June 2025, it was confirmed by Derby head coach John Eustace that Nelson would miss the start of the 2025–26 season as he continued his recovery from his knee ligament injury. In September 2025, Nelson was left out of Derby's 25-man squad, which would delay any possible return to the first team until January 2026, when the squads could be readjusted. A serious injury to Owen Beck allowed Nelson to name in the 25-man squad in November 2025 as a replacement player. Nelson made his first appearance for Derby's first team in 11 months on 6 December 2025 against Leicester City. Nelson made one further appearance in December, before leaving the club in January 2026, in a two-and-a-half year spell at Derby, Nelson made 83 appearances for the first team, scoring four goals.

=== Milton Keynes Dons ===
On 15 January 2026, Nelson joined EFL League Two club Milton Keynes Dons for an undisclosed fee, dropping two divisions and re-uniting with former Derby County coach Paul Warne. He made his debut on 17 January 2026 in a 2–0 away win over Accrington Stanley. Nelson scored his first goal for the club on 7 February 2026, in a 2–3 away win over Cheltenham Town.

At the conclusion of his impressive first season, he achieved a second-placed finish as the club earned promotion back to League One.

== Career statistics ==
As of 8 August 2026

Appearances and goals by club, season and competition
Club	Season	League			FA Cup		League Cup		Other		Total	
Club	Season	Division	Apps	Goals	Apps	Goals	Apps	Goals	Apps	Goals	Apps	Goals
Plymouth Argyle	2009–10	Championship	0	0	0	0	0	0	—		0	0
Plymouth Argyle	2010–11	League One	35	0	1	0	1	0	1 (Note: Appearance(s) in Football League Trophy)	0	38	0
Plymouth Argyle	2011–12	League Two	17	0	2	0	1	0	1	0	21	0
Plymouth Argyle	2012–13	League Two	27	3	1	0	2	0	2	0	32	3
Plymouth Argyle	2013–14	League Two	44	1	5	1	1	0	2	0	52	2
Plymouth Argyle	2014–15	League Two	42	1	2	0	1	0	4 (Note: Two appearances in Football League Trophy, two in League Two play-offs)	0	49	1
Plymouth Argyle	2015–16	League Two	46	3	1	0	1	0	6 (Note: Three appearances in Football League Trophy, three in League Two play-offs)	0	54	3
Plymouth Argyle	Total		211	8	12	1	7	0	16	0	246	9
Oxford United	2016–17	League One	33	2	4	1	1	0	5 (Note: Appearances in EFL Trophy)	0	43	3
Oxford United	2017–18	League One	20	1	0	0	1	0	2	0	23	1
Oxford United	2018–19	League One	46	4	4	0	1	0	4	0	55	4
Oxford United	Total		99	7	8	1	3	0	11	0	121	8
Cardiff City	2019–20	Championship	33	1	0	0	1	0	2 (Note: Appearances in Championship play-offs)	1	36	2
Cardiff City	2020–21	Championship	44	1	1	0	1	0	—		46	1
Cardiff City	2021–22	Championship	30	0	1	0	2	0	—		33	0
Cardiff City	2022–23	Championship	9	0	2	0	1	0	0	0	12	0
Cardiff City	Total		116	2	4	0	5	0	2	1	127	3
Blackpool	2022–23	Championship	18	1	—		—		—		18	1
Derby County	2023–24	League One	46	2	2	0	1	0	2	0	51	2
Derby County	2024–25	Championship	27	2	1	0	2	0	—		30	2
Derby County	2025–26	Championship	2	0	0	0	0	0	—		2	0
Derby County	Total		75	4	3	0	3	0	2	0	83	4
Milton Keynes Dons	2025–26	League Two	18	2	—		—		—		18	2
Milton Keynes Dons	2026–27	League One	0	0	0	0	1	0	0	0	1	0
Milton Keynes Dons	Total		18	2	0	0	1	0	0	0	19	2
Career total			537	24	27	2	19	0	31	1	614	27

== Honours ==
Oxford United

- EFL Trophy runner-up: 2016–17

Derby County

- EFL League One runner-up: 2023–24

Milton Keynes Dons

- EFL League Two runner-up: 2025–26

Individual

- PFA Team of the Year: 2015–16 League Two
- Derby County Player of the Year: 2023–24
