= Max Bardell =

English footballer (born 2002)

Personal information
- Full name: Max James Bardell
- Date of birth: 14 November 2002 (age 24)
- Place of birth: Huddersfield, England
- Position: Defender

Team information
- Current team: FC Halifax Town
- Number: 2

Youth career
- Huddersfield Town
- –2019: Manchester City
- 2019–2023: Derby County

Senior career*
Years	Team	Apps	(Gls)
2021–2025	Derby County	0	(0)
2024–2025	→ AFC Fylde (loan)	26	(0)
2025–2026	Buxton	38	(3)
2026–	FC Halifax Town	3	(0)
- * Club domestic league appearances and goals as of 01:43, 7 August 2026 (UTC)

Max James Bardell (born 14 November 2002) is an English professional footballer who plays as a defender for National League club FC Halifax Town.

After featuring in the academies of Huddersfield Town and Manchester City, he joined Derby County's academy in 2019. He made his first team debut at Derby in 2021 and became a professional that summer. In October 2024, Bardell joined AFC Fylde on a loan which lasted until the end of 2024–25 season. Bardell was released by Derby County after this loan spell in 2025 after six years at the club. Bardell joined Buxton in July 2025, where he spent one season winning the clubs player of the year award before joining FC Halifax Town in July 2026.

== Career ==
=== Derby County ===
Bardell started his career at the academies of Huddersfield Town & Manchester City, before joining the Derby County academy in 2019 on a scholarship.

During the 2019–20 season, Bardell played 18 times for the under-18s in, including two appearances in Derby's run to the play-off rounds in the UEFA Youth League. For the 2020–21, in second year of his scholarship, Bardell captained the under-18 side, as well as making his first appearances for the under-21s.

In January 2021, Derby's first team squad suffered a COVID-19 outbreak which forced the first-team players and staff to miss the club's third round FA Cup tie at Chorley and the club's under-21s and 18s players and staff would replace them. On 9 January, the game took place with Bardell playing 73 minutes at right back, the youthful Derby side lost 2–0, but Bardell won praise for his performance.

In the summer of 2021, Bardell signed his first professional contract with Derby County, after completing his two-year scholarship. During the 2021–22 season, Bardell became a permanent member of the club's under-21s, but a hamstring injury limited appearances. He featured in two first match day Championship squads as an unused substitute in February 2022.

The 2022–23 season was another injury affected one for Bardell, he was restricted to four under-21 appearances. Bardell made his second appearance for the first team in a 5–0 FA Cup First Round replay win over Torquay United in November 2022, Derby described this as his "official" debut. On 18 January 2023, Bardell signed a contract extension, extending his stay at Derby until June 2025.

Bardell featured in two-first team matchday squads in August 2024 at the start of the 2023–24 season A few days after being part of the first team squad, Bardell picked up an injury in the under-21 match against Tottenham Hotspur on 25 August 2023. This injury came at a time when all of Derby's professionally contracted right-backs were sidelined with injury. Bardell would return from his injury in January 2024. However, on 1 March 2024, Bardell picked up another injury in an under-21s match against Manchester United which would end his season prematurely. Bardell played in 6 Premier League 2 matches during the season for the under-21s.

On 30 October 2024, Bardell joined National League side AFC Fylde on an initial one-month loan deal. On 3 December, this loan was extended until January 2025, before then being extended for the remainder of the season. Bardell played 27 times for Fylde during this loan spell, as the suffered relegation to the National League North.

On 16 May 2025, it was announced by Derby County that he would leave the club upon the expiry of his contract at the end of June 2025, after six years at the club; at Derby he made two first-team appearances.

=== Buxton ===
On 24 July 2025, Bardell signed with National League North club Buxton. Bardell made 46 appearances for Buxton scoring 3 goals during the 2025–26 season, his performances during season earned him the clubs player of the season award during his only season at Buxton.

=== FC Halifax Town ===
On 28 July 2026, Bardell signed with FC Halifax Town of the National League on a two-year contract.

== Personal life ==
Born in England, Bardell is of Irish descent.

== Career statistics ==
As of match played 2 May 2026

Appearances and goals by club, season and competition
Club	Season	League			FA Cup		League Cup		Other		Total	
Club	Season	Division	Apps	Goals	Apps	Goals	Apps	Goals	Apps	Goals	Apps	Goals
Derby County	2020–21	Championship	0	0	1	0	0	0	—		1	0
Derby County	2021–22	Championship	0	0	0	0	0	0	—		0	0
Derby County	2022–23	League One	0	0	1	0	0	0	0	0	1	0
Derby County	2023–24	League One	0	0	0	0	0	0	0	0	0	0
Derby County	2024–25	Championship	0	0	0	0	0	0	—		0	0
Derby County	Total		0	0	2	0	0	0	0	0	2	0
AFC Fylde (loan)	2024–25	National League	26	0	0	0	—		1 (Note: Appearance(s) in FA Trophy)	0	27	0
Buxton	2025–26	National League North	38	3	5	0	—		3 (Note: Two appearances in the FA Trophy, two appearances in National League North play-offs)	0	46	3
FC Halifax Town	2026–27	National League	3	0	0	0	—		1 (Note: One appearance in the England National League Cup)	1	4	1
Career total			67	0	7	0	0	0	5	1	79	4
