= Morten Spencer =

British footballer (born 2004)

Personal information
- Full name: Morten Lunde Spencer
- Date of birth: 14 March 2004 (age 22)
- Place of birth: England
- Position: Midfielder

Team information
- Current team: Derby County

Youth career
- Years: Team
- –2020: Sunderland
- 2019–2024: Leeds United
- 2024–2025: Derby County

Morten Lunde Spencer (born 14 March 2004) is a former Norwegian footballer who played as a midfielder. He featured in the academies at Sunderland and Leeds United before joining Derby County in 2024. He announced his retirement from professional football in 2025.

== Early life ==
Spencer attended Egglescliffe School in England.

== Career ==
Spencer played for the youth academy of English side Leeds.

Spencer was released by Leeds in June 2024 at the conclusion of his contract.

In July 2024, Spencer signed with Derby County as an under-21 player.

On 27 March 2025, Spencer announced that he would be retiring from football due to a cardiac problem.

== Style of play ==
Spencer mainly operates as a midfielder and is known for his passing ability.

== Personal life ==
Spencer has a younger sister.
