= Liam Thompson (footballer) =

English footballer (born 2002)

Personal information
- Full name: Liam Francis Thompson
- Date of birth: 29 April 2002 (age 24)
- Place of birth: Nottingham, England
- Height: 1.73 m (5 ft 8 in)
- Position: Defensive midfielder

Team information
- Current team: Mansfield Town
- Number: 16

Youth career
- 2015–2021: Derby County

Senior career*
Years	Team	Apps	(Gls)
2021–2026	Derby County	105	(2)
2023	→ Scunthorpe United (loan)	3	(0)
2026–	Mansfield Town	0	(0)
- * Club domestic league appearances and goals as of 17:11, 14 February 2026 (UTC)

Liam Francis Thompson (born 29 April 2002) is an English professional footballer who plays as a defensive midfielder for EFL League One club Mansfield Town.

A youth product of Derby County, Thompson made his Derby debut in 2021, after signing his first professional contract in 2020. He had a spell out on loan at Scunthorpe United in 2023, and in 2024 he helped Derby gain promotion to the Championship. Thompson made 124 first team appearances at Derby County. In August 2026, Thompson joined Mansfield Town.

== Career ==
=== Derby County ===
Thompson joined the Derby County youth set-up as a teenager, having played youth football with Nottingham-based Dunkirk. During the 2018–19 Under 18 season, Thompson played an influential role in Derby's title-winning campaign. In November 2019, he was named in the League Football Education (LFE) 'The 11' to acknowledge his holistic development on and off the pitch.

Thompson signed his first professional contract with the club in 2020. He made his professional debut for the first team in a 2–0 FA Cup third round defeat at non-league Chorley on 9 January 2021. The entire Derby County first team squad was forced to self-isolate for the game because of positive COVID-19 cases, meaning The Rams' under-23 squad fulfilled the fixture. Thompson continued to work with the first team squad, and appeared on the bench, and in pre-season friendlies against teams including Manchester United.

Thompson made his Championship debut in a 3–2 victory over AFC Bournemouth on 21 November 2021, playing the whole game. He went on to make 23 more appearances throughout the season, as Derby were eventually relegated to League One.

On 2 July 2022, following Derby's takeover by David Clowes, Thompson was able to extend his contract with the club until 2024. Thompson was mainly used as a substitute player during the season, starting one league game, he did score his first goal in senior football in the FA Cup first round replay against Torquay United on 15 November 2022.

On 21 March 2023, Thompson signed for National League club Scunthorpe United on loan until the end of the season. However a hip flexor injury restricted Thompson just three appearances for Scunthorpe.

Ahead of the 2023–24 season, Thompson impressed head coach Paul Warne in pre-season and hinted at a possible position to change to left-wing back after playing in this role several time in pre-season friendlies. Thompson would start the season as a substitute for the first four matches of the season, before making his first start in central midfield in a 1–0 win against Fleetwood Town on 20 August 2023, a man of the match award which earned the praise of Warne post match. On 31 August 2023, Thompson tore his quadriceps in training and was ruled out of action for two months, he picked up the injury with ball getting trapped under his feet, this was described as "blow" to Derby County. Thompson did not return to action until December 2023 and on his second appearance back he scored his first career senior league goal at Oxford United on 29 December 2023, his goal came a minute after being substituted into the game as Derby came back from 0–2 to win 3–2. Thompson proved to be versatile player for Derby in the second half of the season, playing in a multitude of positions as they were fighting for an "amazing" promotion back to the Championship. Thompson made 26 appearances during the season, scoring one goal as Derby won promotion to the Championship by finishing runners-up in League One.

On 18 May 2024, it was announced that Derby had trigged a one-year clause to extend Thompson's contract at Derby until June 2025. Thompson score first EFL Cup goal in 2–1 win over Chesterfield on 13 August 2024. A groin injury sustained in a training session in September 2024 restricted his appearances in the early part of the 2024–25 season. Thompson would return to action a month later but struggle to tie down a regular place in the starting 11 until the last two months of the season where under new head coach John Eustace, Thompson found a role in a three man midfield alongside Ebou Adams and Everton loanee Harrison Armstrong, Thompson's performances earned praise from Eustace as improved from Derby in these games helped the club fight off relegation to League One. Thompson played 31 times for Derby during the season, scoring once. Thompson made his 100th appearance for Derby County in March 2025. At Derby County's end of season awards, Thompson was named Sammy Crooks Young Player of the Season.

In May 2025, Derby County confirmed that Thompson was in talks with Derby to extend his contract which expired in June 2025. On 1 July 2025, it was announced that Thompson had signed a new two-year contract at Derby. On 15 December 2025. Thompson scored his first Championship goal in a 3–0 win at Sheffield Wednesday. Thompson found it hard to find a regular place in the Derby team due to injuries and falling down the pecking order. He made 18 appearances during the season, scoring once.

Thompson played 124 times during his spell at Derby County and scored four goals.

=== Mansfield Town ===
On 5 August 2026, Thompson left Derby County to sign with Mansfield for an undisclosed fee, he signed a two-year contract with the League One club.

== Career statistics ==
As of match played 14 February 2026

Appearances and goals by club, season and competition
Club	Season	League			FA Cup		League Cup		Other		Total	
Club	Season	Division	Apps	Goals	Apps	Goals	Apps	Goals	Apps	Goals	Apps	Goals
Derby County	2020–21	Championship	0	0	1	0	0	0	—		1	0
Derby County	2021–22	Championship	23	0	1	0	0	0	—		24	0
Derby County	2022–23	League One	13	0	5	1	3	0	3 (Note: Appearances(s) in EFL Trophy)	0	24	1
Derby County	2023–24	League One	24	1	0	0	1	0	1	0	26	1
Derby County	2024–25	Championship	28	0	1	0	2	1	—		31	1
Derby County	2025–26	Championship	17	1	0	0	1	0	—		18	1
Derby County	Total		105	2	8	1	7	1	4	0	124	4
Scunthorpe United (loan)	2022–23	National League	3	0	—		—		—		3	0
Mansfield Town	2026–27	League One	0	0	0	0	0	0	0	0	0	0
Career total			108	2	8	1	7	1	4	0	127	4

== Honours ==
Derby County

- EFL League One second-place promotion: 2023–24
