= Liam Thompson (rugby league) =

English rugby league footballer

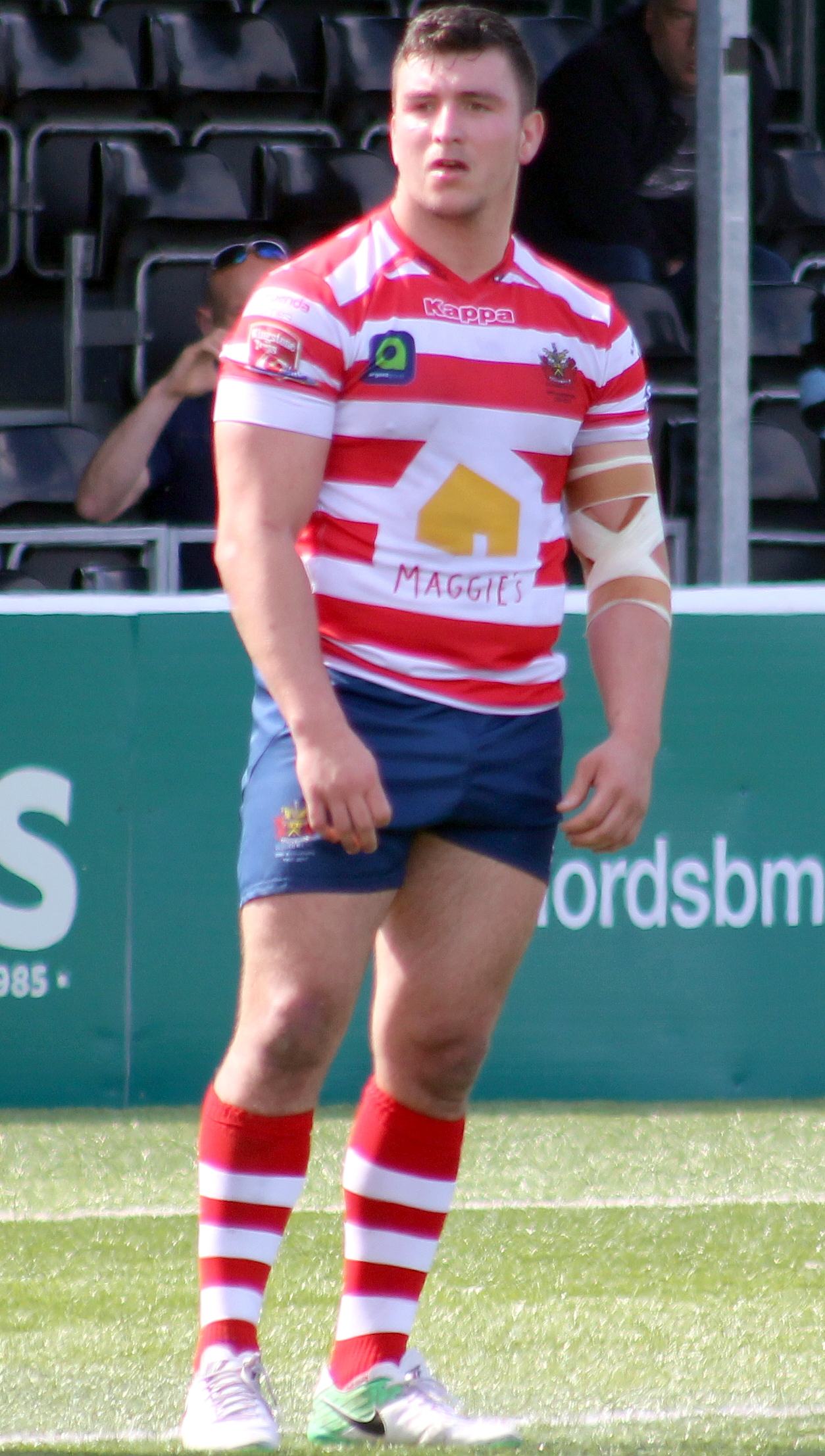

Personal information
- Born: 3 January 1992 (age 34) Wigan, Greater Manchester, England

Playing information
- Position: Second-row, Loose forward, Prop
Club
Years	Team	Pld	T	G	FG	P
2012–17	Oldham	104	14	1	0	58
- Source: As of 3 October 2017

Liam Thompson (born 3 January 1992) is an English professional rugby league footballer who last played for Oldham in League 1. He plays as a second-row or loose forward.

== Background ==
Thompson was born in Wigan, Greater Manchester, England. He attended The University of Central Lancashire making numerous appearances for the Universities first team. He now resides in Surfers Paradise, Queensland, Australia.

== Career ==
Thompson came through the Wigan Warriors academy and was in the junior systems of the Widnes Vikings. He has also represented England at Schoolboy level.

Thompson emigrated to Australia in 2018 signing for Stingrays RLFC Shellharbour later joining Currumbin Eagles.
