= Eiran Cashin =

Irish footballer (born 2001)

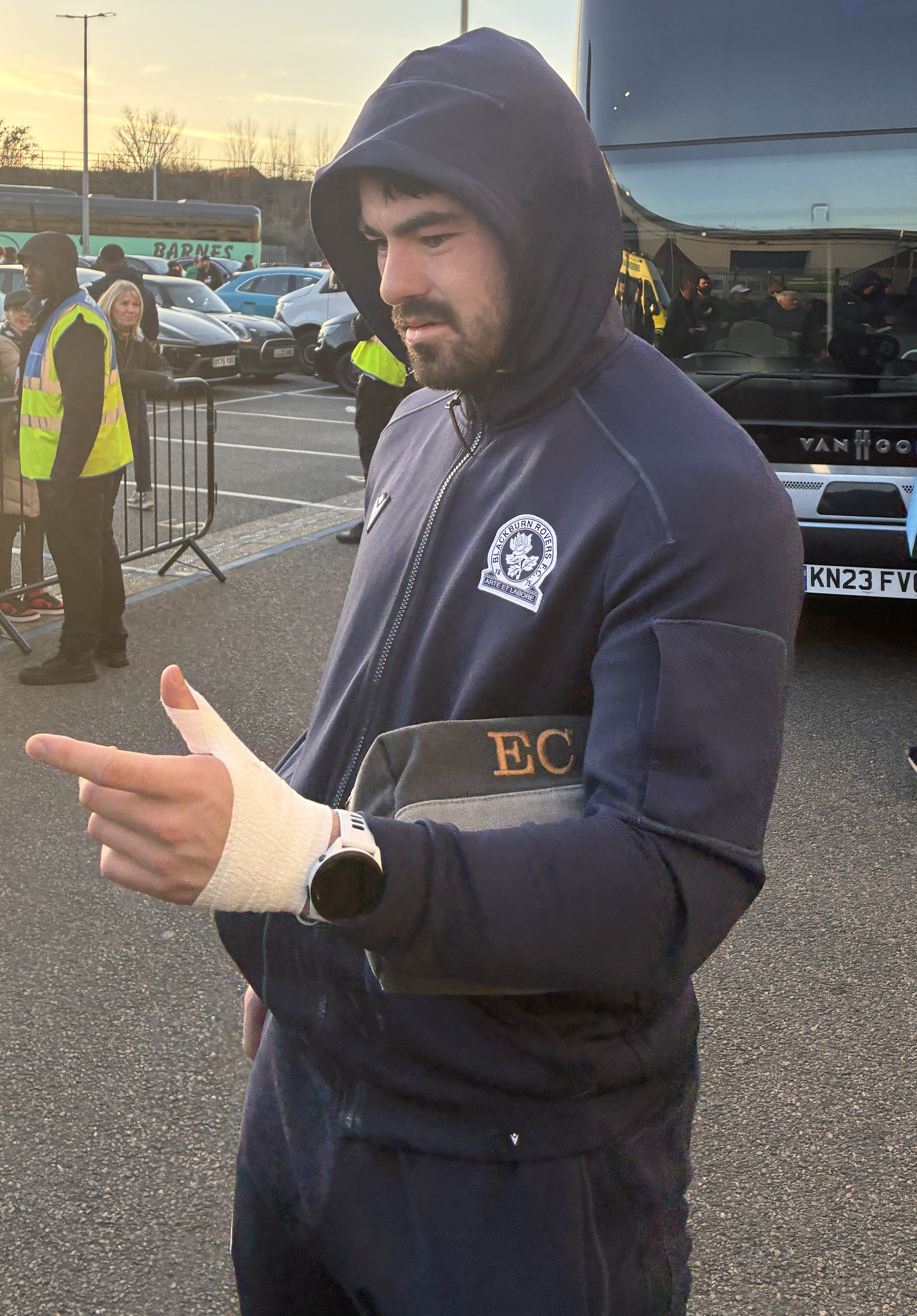
- Cashin in 2026.

Personal information
- Full name: Eiran Joe Cashin
- Date of birth: 9 November 2001 (age 25)
- Place of birth: Mansfield, England
- Height: 1.80 m (5 ft 11 in)
- Position: Centre-back

Team information
- Current team: Derby County (on loan from Brighton & Hove Albion)
- Number: 44

Youth career
- 2009–2021: Derby County

Senior career*
Years	Team	Apps	(Gls)
2021–2025	Derby County	126	(6)
2025–	Brighton & Hove Albion	2	(0)
2025–2026	→ Birmingham City (loan)	11	(0)
2026	→ Blackburn Rovers (loan)	18	(1)
2026–	→ Derby County (loan)	2	(0)

International career^{‡}
2019	Republic of Ireland U18	1	(0)
2022	Republic of Ireland U21	4	(0)
- * Club domestic league appearances and goals as of 13:53, 12 September 2026 (UTC) ‡ National team caps and goals as of 23:52, 27 September 2022 (UTC)

Eiran Joe Cashin (born 9 November 2001) is a professional footballer who plays as a centre-back for EFL Championship club Derby County, on loan from Premier League club Brighton & Hove Albion. Born in England, he was a youth international for the Republic of Ireland.

Cashin joined Derby County's academy and in 2018–19 was a part of Derby's U18 Premier League title success. In 2020, Cashin signed his first professional contract for Derby and in December 2021, he made his first team debut. He was named in the League One Team of the Season for 2023–24.

In January 2025, after 144 appearances and six goals for Derby, Cashin joined Premier League club Brighton & Hove Albion. He has had loan spells at Birmingham City, Blackburn Rovers and Derby County whilst at Brighton.

Born in Nottinghamshire, Cashin is eligible to represent Republic of Ireland through his grandmother and Cashin has been capped at under-18 and under-21 level for the Republic.

== Club career ==
=== Derby County ===
A youth product of Derby County, Cashin first played as a central midfielder for the academy, before being converted to a central defender. Cashin was during the 2018–19 season, a part of Derby's U18 Premier League title success. Despite being very close to being released by the club due to COVID-19 concerns, Cashin signed his first professional contract with the club in the summer of 2020. During the 2020–21 season, Cashin started to feature in first team matchday squads under Wayne Rooney, as well as his role in the under-23 team.

During the 2021–22 season, Cashin broke into the first team. However, his debut for the first team was delayed to the EFL squad registration restrictions due to Derby's administration. He made his professional debut with Derby County on 11 December 2021, coming on as a late substitute in a 1–0 EFL Championship win over Blackpool. His first goal in senior football came on 30 April 2022, in a 2–0 win away to Blackpool. He played a total of eighteen league matches during the season, as Derby were eventually relegated to League One. Cashin thanked Rooney for his loyalty in giving him his first taste of first team action in a difficult season for the club.

On 2 July 2022, following Derby's takeover by Clowes Developments, Cashin was able to extend his contract with the club until 2024. He was a first team regular during the 2022–23 season, making 52 appearances and scoring one goal (against Charlton Athletic) as he was named the club's Young Player of the Year. Cashin played the last six games of the season with a hernia injury, as Derby fell short of the play-offs by a point and a place.

Cashin went into the 2023–24 season once again as the club's first choice central defender and in the summer transfer window was linked with a transfer to Premier League club Brighton & Hove Albion who had multiple bids rejected in July and August 2023, head coach Paul Warne stating that these bids did not match Derby's valuation. Brighton did match Derby's valuation at the end of the transfer window on 1 September 2023, but the transfer did not occur due to inadequate time to find a replacement or arrange a loan back deal for Cashin.

Cashin was not named in Derby's starting line-up the following day against Bolton Wanderers due to arriving at the team hotel 2am the night before the game. In a March 2024 interview for the Derby Telegraph, Cashin stated that he had spent six hours in a Starbucks coffee shop near Little Eaton unsure whether he was going to Brighton to complete a transfer or to Bolton for Derby's match the following day. Cashin stated that Warne was gutted for him that this "life-changing opportunity" had broken down but told Cashin to keep his head down and focus on the season ahead at Derby.

On 23 November 2023, amid speculation that a bigger club might submit an offer for the player, Warne said Cashin would be offered a new contract. Warne told Cashin on 27 December 2023 that he was not for sale. Derby activated a one-year extension clause on Cashin's contract on 1 January 2024, to extend his contract until June 2025 and stated that the player was not for sale in the January transfer window; he also made his 100th senior appearance for Derby on the same day.

On 2 February 2024, he signed another new contract, extending his contract until June 2027. Cashin and his central defensive partner Curtis Nelson, were one of the strongest and most reliable defensive partnerships in League One during this season as their relationship and trust in each other showed on the field. Cashin with these performances was named in the League One Team of the Year in the 2024 EFL Awards for the 2023–24 season, he also featured in the PFA League One Team of the Year. He played 44 times in the league with, statistically, one of the strongest defences during this season, with Derby chalking up 21 league clean sheets while Cashin was on the pitch. Cashin also won back-to-back Young Player of Year awards at Derby. He made 52 appearances in total for Derby during the season as Derby finished runners-up in the division and earned automatically promotion to the Championship.

For the 2024–25 season, Cashin was once again a first choice at centre-back for Derby, but would miss three games with a concussion picked up against Middlesbrough on 17 August 2024. On 1 October 2024, Cashin became captain of Derby County for the first time against Sunderland, later stating that captaining the side at age of 22 was an "honour". On 13 December 2024, Cashin scored his first and only goal for Derby in the 2024–25 season in a 4–0 win over Portsmouth. Cashin suffered a hamstring injury in the same match, which ruled him out of action for a month. Cashin made a total of 22 appearances for Derby during the season. Cashin made a total of 144 appearances for Derby during his career at the club, scoring six goals.

=== Brighton & Hove Albion ===
On 31 January 2025, Cashin signed for Premier League club Brighton & Hove Albion for an undisclosed transfer fee, signing a five-and-a-half-year contract. Just over two months later on 2 April, Cashin made his debut for Brighton as a substitute for club captain Lewis Dunk in a 0–3 loss against Aston Villa.

==== Birmingham City (loan) ====
On 25 July 2025, Cashin moved to Birmingham City on a season-long loan deal until the end of the 2025–26 season. Cashin was recalled on 6 January 2026. During his loan spell, he made 13 appearances for the Blues.

==== Blackburn Rovers (loan) ====
On 6 January 2026, Cashin joined Blackburn Rovers on a short-term loan until the end of the 2025–26 season. On 3 February, Cashin scored his first goal since 2024 in a 1–0 win over Sheffield Wednesday. On 19 May, the club announced that Cashin had returned to Brighton following the conclusion of his loan spell.

==== Derby County (loan) ====
He re-joined former club Derby County on loan on 1 September 2026. He made his second debut for Derby County in a 1–0 defeat to West Bromwich Albion on 9 September.

== International career ==
Born in England, Cashin is a youth international for the Republic of Ireland. He qualifies through a grandmother born in County Leitrim.

He played for the Republic of Ireland U18s in a 4–0 loss to the Turkey U18s in March 2019.

On 6 June 2022, Cashin made his debut for the Republic of Ireland U21 team, assisting the second goal in a 3–1 win over Montenegro U21 at Tallaght Stadium.

On 5 May 2026, Cashin was called up to the Republic of Ireland senior team for a friendly against Grenada in Murcia, Spain.

== Style of play ==
Cashin is a central defender who is strong in aerial duels. He is known for breaking up attacks from the opposition with interceptions and good defensive positioning. Cashin has scored several headed goals from set pieces. He was adaptable in League One as he moved from a slow-possession based system under Liam Rosenior to a faster more direct system under Paul Warne.

== Career statistics ==
As of match played 12 September 2026

Appearances and goals by club, season and competition
Club	Season	League			FA Cup		EFL Cup		Other		Total	
Club	Season	Division	Apps	Goals	Apps	Goals	Apps	Goals	Apps	Goals	Apps	Goals
Derby County	2021–22	Championship	18	1	0	0	0	0	—		18	1
Derby County	2022–23	League One	43	1	5	0	2	0	2 (Note: Appearances in EFL Trophy)	0	52	1
Derby County	2023–24	League One	44	3	2	0	1	0	5	0	52	3
Derby County	2024–25	Championship	21	1	0	0	1	0	—		22	1
Derby County	Total		126	6	7	0	4	0	7	0	144	6
Brighton & Hove Albion	2024–25	Premier League	2	0	0	0	—		—		2	0
Brighton & Hove Albion	2025–26	Premier League	0	0	—		—		—		0	0
Brighton & Hove Albion	2026–27	Premier League	0	0	—		—		0	0	0	0
Brighton & Hove Albion	Total		2	0	0	0	0	0	0	0	2	0
Birmingham City (loan)	2025–26	Championship	11	0	—		2	0	—		13	0
Blackburn Rovers (loan)	2025–26	Championship	18	1	1	0	—		—		19	1
Derby County (loan)	2026–27	Championship	2	0	0	0	—		—		2	0
Career total			159	7	8	0	6	0	7	0	180	7

== Honours ==
Derby County

- EFL League One second-place promotion: 2023–24

Individual

- Derby County Young Player of the Season: 2022–23, 2023–24
- EFL League One Team of the Season: 2023–24
- PFA Team of the Year: 2023–24 League One
