= Liam Thompson (YouTuber) =

New Zealand YouTuber

- Born: Liam Michael Thompson; 25 April 2000 (age 26); Auckland, Auckland, New Zealand
- Education: Mount Albert Grammar School
- Occupation: YouTuber

YouTube information
- Channel: Liam Thompson
- Years active: 2016–present
- Genre: Entertainment
- Subscribers: 2.07 million
- Views: 343 million
- Last updated: 12 August 2026

Liam Michael Thompson (born 25 April 2000) is a New Zealand YouTube personality. As of May 2024, he has over 2.1 million subscribers. Thompson's channel consists of a mix of different videos with no common theme; however, his most successful videos tend to include his pet labradoodle, Max. He often included his cat named Frodo (died 26 February 2022). After Frodo died he got a cat named Samwise which he revealed in a YouTube video. However, it was revealed that Samwise died in 2025.

== Early life ==
Liam Michael Thompson was born in Auckland, Auckland, New Zealand as the second of four siblings. He attended Balmoral School and Mount Albert Grammar School, where he was a Prefect and involved in orienteering, competing successfully at many regional and national championships. In 2018, he was the inaugural recipient of the Service to MAGS Sport award. After graduating in 2018, Thompson began studying engineering. He soon dropped out to pursue YouTube while enrolling in Police college, moving furniture and considering film school. Thompson started a blog called Velterro in 2019, focusing on tips for self-improvement, productivity, money and health. As of 2024, the blog is inactive.

== YouTube career ==
Thompson has been actively posting on YouTube since mid 2019. His channel gained a large amount of traction in September 2019 after posting the video I Taught My Dog To Play Minecraft, which has over 22.3 million views as of February 2022. In an interview with New Zealand media outlet Stuff, he stated that "It took me four months to get 80 [subscribers] and, a week later, I had 150,000". Thompson subsequently decided to pursue YouTube full time. On 20 July 2020, his YouTube channel reached 1 million subscribers. He celebrated the next day with a video, in which he bought Max 1 million dog biscuits, most of which he donated. Thompson is among the top 10 YouTubers in New Zealand, with the 8th most subscribers in March 2024.
