= Nat Phillips =

English footballer (born 1997)

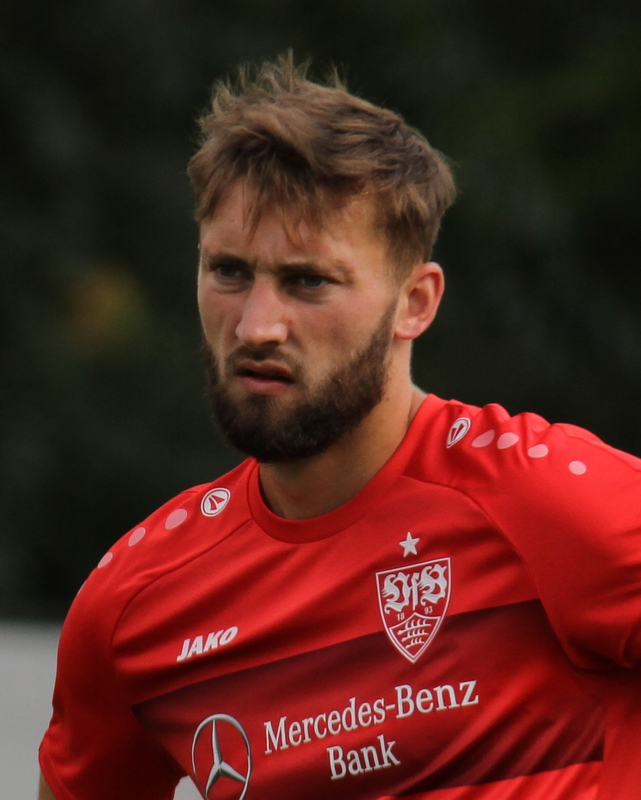
- Phillips training with VfB Stuttgart in 2019

Personal information
- Full name: Nathaniel Harry Phillips
- Date of birth: 21 March 1997 (age 29)
- Place of birth: Bolton, England
- Height: 6 ft 3 in (1.90 m)
- Position: Centre-back

Team information
- Current team: West Bromwich Albion
- Number: 3

Youth career
- –2016: Bolton Wanderers
- 2016–2019: Liverpool

Senior career*
Years	Team	Apps	(Gls)
2019–2025	Liverpool	19	(1)
2019–2020	→ VfB Stuttgart (loan)	9	(0)
2020	→ VfB Stuttgart (loan)	10	(0)
2022	→ AFC Bournemouth (loan)	17	(0)
2023–2024	→ Celtic (loan)	6	(0)
2024	→ Cardiff City (loan)	18	(1)
2024–2025	→ Derby County (loan)	32	(1)
2025–	West Bromwich Albion	53	(3)
- * Club domestic league appearances and goals as of 17:56, 17 November 2026 (UTC)

Nathaniel Harry Phillips (born 21 March 1997) is an English professional footballer who plays as a centre-back for EFL Championship club West Bromwich Albion.

Phillips started his professional career at Liverpool, had two loan spells at VfB Stuttgart, before making his debut for Liverpool in 2020. After his Liverpool debut, he had further loan spells at AFC Bournemouth, Celtic, Cardiff City and Derby County.

== Early life ==
Nathaniel Harry Phillips was born on 21 March 1997 in Bolton, Greater Manchester.

== Career ==
=== Early career ===
In 2016, Phillips left Bolton Wanderers' academy and trained at Huddersfield Town after he secured a scholarship at the University of North Carolina at Charlotte. Two days before his planned flight to the United States, he joined Liverpool's academy instead.

=== Liverpool ===
In the summer of 2018, Phillips started to train with Liverpool's first team and became a member of Jürgen Klopp's squad while still playing for the reserve team.

==== VfB Stuttgart loan and Liverpool recall ====
In 2019, Phillips moved to German second-division club VfB Stuttgart on loan for the season. He made his professional debut for Stuttgart in the first round of the 2019–20 DFB-Pokal, coming on as a half-time substitute for Holger Badstuber in the away match against 3. Liga club Hansa Rostock. Phillips made his first appearance in the 2019–20 2. Bundesliga on 17 August 2019 against FC St. Pauli. On 27 December 2019, Liverpool announced that Phillips would be recalled from his loan on 1 January 2020 due to a defender injury crisis at his parent club. Twelve days later, after making his first team debut for Liverpool on 5 January 2020 in an FA Cup third round match against Everton, he was loaned back to VfB Stuttgart for the remainder of the 2019–20 season.

==== Return to Liverpool ====
On 31 October 2020, Phillips made his league debut for Liverpool, starting in a 2–1 win over West Ham United. On 10 March 2021, Phillips made his Champions League debut, putting in a man of the match performance in a 2–0 win over RB Leipzig, and helping Liverpool advance to the quarter finals 4–0 on aggregate.

Phillips scored his first goal for the club on 19 May 2021, scoring a headed goal and Liverpool's second of the game during a 3–0 away win over Burnley in the Premier League and claimed another man of the match award, this was his only goal for the club. The following season, Phillips played in Liverpool's 2–1 win against AC Milan at the San Siro to complete the Champions League group stage with six wins. Days later it was revealed Phillips suffered a fractured cheekbone during the game. With game time limited in the 2021–22 season, Phillips admitted to being ready to leave the club in the January transfer window.

==== AFC Bournemouth (loan) ====
On 31 January 2022, Phillips joined AFC Bournemouth on loan until the end of the season. Regarding the move, Klopp commented that "he would have loved to have kept him [at Liverpool]" and that Phillips was "incredibly reliable [and a] great figure here at the training ground." He made his debut for the club in the FA Cup on 6 February in a 1–0 loss to non-league side Boreham Wood. Phillips made his league debut for the club, and his first appearance in the Championship, in a 3–1 victory against Birmingham City on 9 February.

==== Celtic (loan) ====
On 31 August 2023, Phillips joined Scottish Premiership side Celtic on loan until January 2024. He made his league debut for the club in a 3–0 win against Dundee on 16 September. On 4 October, Phillips made his Champions League debut for Celtic in a 2–1 loss against Lazio on 4 October. After struggling to break into the first team at Celtic, he was recalled back to Liverpool in January.

==== Cardiff City (loan) ====
On 30 January 2024, Phillips joined EFL Championship club Cardiff City, on loan for the remainder of the 2023–24 season. He made his league debut for the club on 3 February in a 1–0 win against Watford.

==== Derby County (loan) ====
On 30 August 2024, Phillips joined EFL Championship club Derby County, on loan for the remainder of the 2024–25 season. Derby head coach Paul Warne stated that his signing would give him "greater tactical flexibility" in team selection. Phillips made his Derby debut against former loan club Cardiff City on 14 September 2024. He made his first start for Derby at Sunderland on 1 October 2024. Phillips scored his first goal for Derby in a 1–0 win at Hull City on 26 April 2025. Under new head coach John Eustace, Phillips impressed with his performance in a central defensive trio alongside Matt Clarke and Sondre Langås as Derby managed to escape relegation to League One, Phillips played 33 times for Derby during his loan spell and Eustace stated a desire for the player to return for the 2025–26 season.

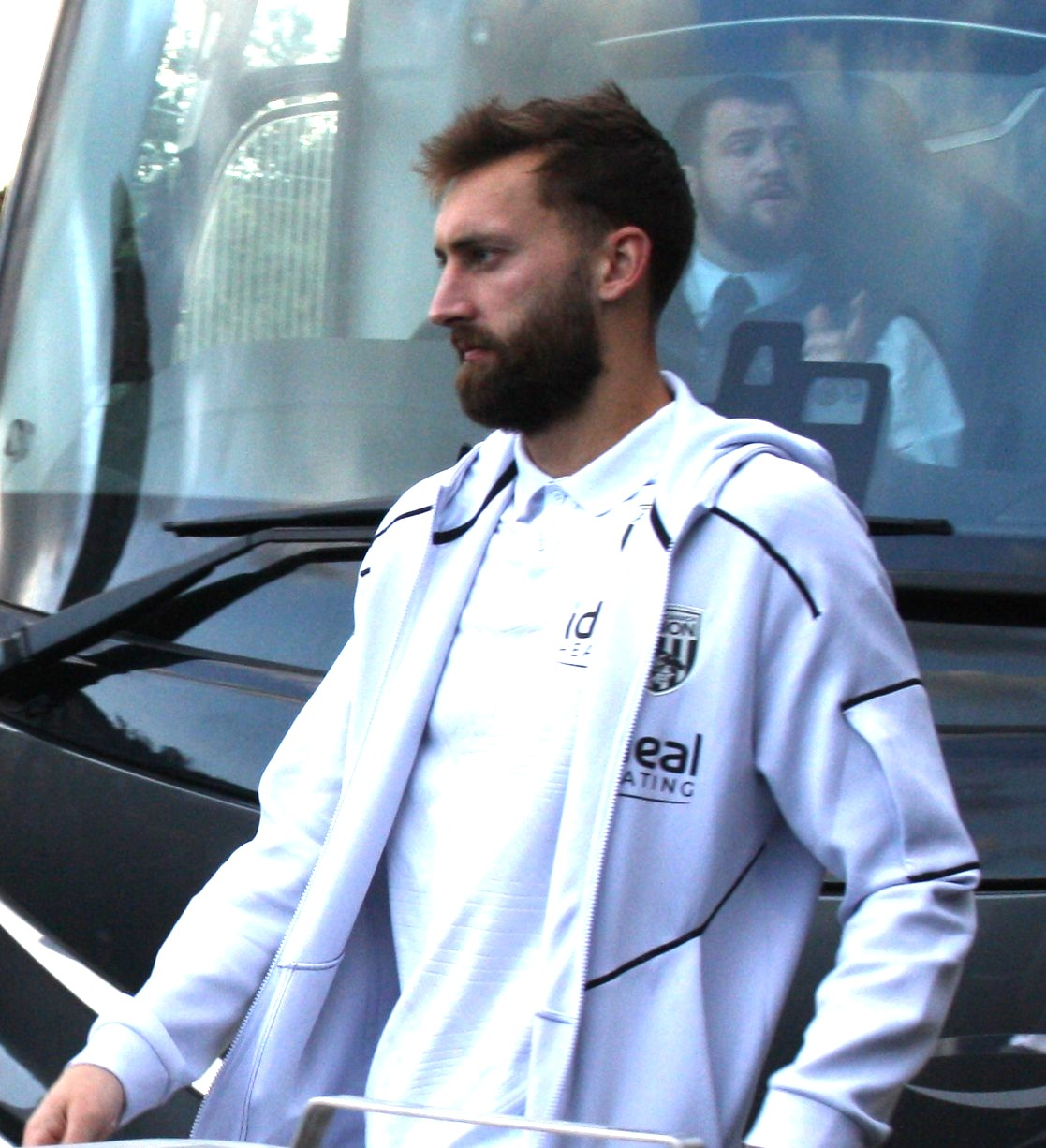
Phillips with West Bromwich in 2025

=== West Bromwich Albion ===
On 23 June 2025, Phillips signed for Championship side West Bromwich Albion on a three-year contract for an undisclosed fee. Nathaniel Phillips made his debut for West Bromwich Albion against Blackburn Rovers on 9 August 2025. His first goal for West Bromwich came on 30 August 2025, as he scored in a 0-1 win over Stoke City.

== Personal life ==
Nathaniel is the son of former footballer Jimmy Phillips and played under his management in the Bolton Wanderers academy.

Since early 2022, Phillips has been dating Molly Moorish-Gallagher, the daughter of Lisa Moorish and Liam Gallagher. In May 2025, Phillips and Moorish-Gallagher announced that they were expecting their first child. Their son was born in September 2025.

== Career statistics ==
As of match played 17 October 2026

Club	Season	League			National cup (Note: Includes FA Cup, DFB-Pokal)		League cup (Note: Includes EFL Cup)		Europe		Other		Total	
Club	Season	Division	Apps	Goals	Apps	Goals	Apps	Goals	Apps	Goals	Apps	Goals	Apps	Goals
Liverpool	2019–20	Premier League	0	0	1	0	—		0	0	0	0	1	0
Liverpool	2020–21	Premier League	17	1	0	0	0	0	3 (Note: Appearances in UEFA Champions League)	0	0	0	20	1
Liverpool	2021–22	Premier League	0	0	0	0	1	0	2	0	—		3	0
Liverpool	2022–23	Premier League	2	0	1	0	2	0	0	0	0	0	5	0
Liverpool	Total		19	1	2	0	3	0	5	0	0	0	29	1
VfB Stuttgart (loan)	2019–20	2. Bundesliga	19	0	3	0	—		—		—		22	0
Liverpool U21	2021–22	—			—		—		—		1 (Note: Appearance in EFL Trophy)	0	1	0
AFC Bournemouth (loan)	2021–22	Championship	17	0	1	0	—		—		—		18	0
Celtic (loan)	2023–24	Scottish Premiership	6	0	—		—		2	0	—		8	0
Cardiff City (loan)	2023–24	Championship	18	1	—		—		—		—		18	1
Derby County (loan)	2024–25	Championship	32	1	1	0	—		—		—		33	1
West Bromwich Albion	2025–26	Championship	40	3	1	0	0	0	—		—		41	3
West Bromwich Albion	2026–27	Championship	13	0	0	0	1	0	—		—		14	0
West Bromwich Albion	Total		53	3	1	0	1	0	—		—		55	3
Career total			153	6	8	0	3	0	7	0	1	0	172	6

== Honours ==
VfB Stuttgart

- 2. Bundesliga runner-up: 2019–20

AFC Bournemouth

- EFL Championship runner-up: 2021–22
