= Cruz Allen =

Welsh footballer (born 2007)

Personal information
- Full name: Cruz Anthony Allen
- Date of birth: 25 February 2007 (age 19)
- Place of birth: England
- Position: Attacking midfielder

Team information
- Current team: FC Halifax Town (on loan from Derby County)
- Number: 27

Youth career
- Burton Albion
- –2025: Derby County

Senior career*
Years	Team	Apps	(Gls)
2023–	Derby County	3	(0)
2026–	→ Halifax Town (loan)	1	(0)

International career^{‡}
2022	Wales U15	3	(0)
2022–2023	Wales U16	7	(1)
2023–2024	Wales U17	13	(2)
2024	Wales U18	3	(0)
2024–2026	Wales U19	18	(1)
- * Club domestic league appearances and goals as of 11:00, 30 August 2026 (UTC) ‡ National team caps and goals as of 19:30, 22 July 2026 (UTC)

Cruz Anthony Allen (born 25 February 2007) is a professional footballer who plays as an attacking midfielder for National League club Halifax Town, on loan from EFL Championship club Derby County. He is a Wales Under 19 international.

A youth product of Derby County, Allen made his first team debut in 2023, he signed his first professional contract in 2024. He made his league debut in 2026. He was loaned out to FC Halifax Town in August 2026.

== Club career ==
Allen started his footballing career in the Burton Albion academy, before joining the Derby County academy at under-10 level. Allen progressed through the age groups in Derby's academy, making his first appearances for the under-18s aged 16 in the 2022–23 season. The 2023–24 saw Allen became a regular in the under-18s, he made his debut for the under-21 at age of 16.

On 8 November 2023, Allen made his debut for the first team of Derby County, aged 16 in a 4–1 win over Wolverhampton Wanderers U21 in the EFL Trophy as a 79th-minute substitute for Adebayo Fapetu. In this game, he showed a good ability on the ball and came close to scoring.

After interest from Premier League clubs such as Chelsea, Manchester United and Newcastle United, Allen signed first professional contract at Derby County in March 2024, on a deal until June 2026. The 2024–25 season saw Allen become a regular in the under-21 team at Derby and he featured in two first team match day squads an unused substitute.

On 21 February 2026, Allen made his second appearance for the first team and his first in the league, as he came as injury time substitute for Lewis Travis in a 2–0 Championship defeat to Watford. Allen made three appearances for the Derby County first team in the 2025–26 season.

On 15 May 2026, it was announced that Allen was "in discussion about his future" at Derby County with his contract expiring in June 2026. On 24 June 2026, it was announced that Allen had signed a new two-year contract at Derby County.

On 28 August 2026, Allen joined FC Halifax Town of the National League on a month's loan. He made his debut for Halifax later that day as a 70th minute substitute in a 2–1 defeat to Altrincham.

== International career ==
Allen has been capped by Wales at under-15, 16, 17, 18 and 19 level. Allen featured in the squad for Wales under-17 in the 2024 UEFA European Under-17 Championship. He qualifies for Wales through his Welsh-born father.

== Style of play ==
An attacking midfielder, Allen has been described as a player with strengths being his composure on the ball, his abilities at taking free-kicks were also notable in his youth career.

== Career statistics ==
As of match played 28 August 2026

Appearances and goals by club, season and competition
Club	Season	League			FA Cup		EFL Cup		Other		Total	
Club	Season	Division	Apps	Goals	Apps	Goals	Apps	Goals	Apps	Goals	Apps	Goals
Derby County	2023–24	League One	0	0	0	0	0	0	1 (Note: Appearances in the EFL Trophy)	0	1	0
Derby County	2024–25	Championship	0	0	0	0	0	0	—		0	0
Derby County	2025–26	Championship	3	0	0	0	0	0	—		3	0
Derby County	2026–27	Championship	0	0	0	0	0	0	—		0	0
Derby County	Total		3	0	0	0	0	0	1	0	4	0
FC Halifax Town (loan)	2026–27	National League	1	0	—		—		—		1	0
Career total			4	0	0	0	0	0	1	0	5	0
