= 2019–20 Derby County F.C. season =

Derby County
2019–20 season
- Chairman: Mel Morris
- Manager: Phillip Cocu
- Stadium: Pride Park Stadium
- Championship: 10th
- FA Cup: Fifth round
- EFL Cup: Second round
- Top goalscorer: League: Martyn Waghorn (12); All: Martyn Waghorn; Chris Martin (12)
- Highest home attendance: 28,454 (vs. Birmingham City)
- Lowest home attendance: 24,697 (vs. Wigan Athletic)
- Average home league attendance: 26,727
Home colours	Away colours	Third colours

The 2019–20 season was Derby County's twelfth consecutive season in the Championship in their 136th year in existence. Along with competing in the Championship, the club also participated in the FA Cup and the EFL Cup. The season covered the period from 1 July 2019 to 22 July 2020.

This season was the first for manager Phillip Cocu, after the previous manager Frank Lampard left on 4 July 2019 to become head coach at Premier League club Chelsea.

After a poor first half of the season saw Derby in 17th and just seven points clear of relegation, the arrival of Wayne Rooney saw a galvanised Derby side lose just three of their sixteen games after the New Year and just three points off the playoff positions with just five games remaining. However a run of four straight defeats - all against teams occupying the top six - ended any hopes of a third consecutive playoff campaign as they finished six points behind Swansea City in 6th. The 10th-placed finish, and a return of 64 points, was Derby's worst league performance since the 2012–13 season, when they also finished 10th but achieved just 61 points.

== Review ==
=== Pre-season ===
The Derby squad reported back for pre-season training on 1 July, with uncertainty remaining over the future over Frank Lampard, who was excused from attending training to undergo talks with Chelsea about their vacant managerial position. With speculation over Lampard's future, Phillip Cocu was installed as favourite to replace Lampard, with former Ram Darren Moore, Lincoln City's Darren Cowley, Derby Academy boss Darren Wassall, Chris Hughton and Wycombe Wanderers manager Gareth Ainsworth also rumoured. Lampard was officially appointed as Chelsea's head coach on 4 July, after just one year at Derby and Phillip Cocu was confirmed as his replacement the next day, becoming the first foreign manager in the club's 136-year history. Following Cocu's arrival, and with the new season just a month away, Derby were given promotion odds of 11/2, putting them as ninth-favourite.

Pre-season preparations began with a 10-day training camp at the IMG Academy in Bradenton, Florida. A 2–0 victory over local USL League Two side Sarasota Metropolis was followed by a match with fellow EFL Championship side Bristol City, which was abandoned at half-time due to extreme weather conditions, with the Rams trailing 1–0. The match was rearranged for the following day and played over two, 30-minute halves, with the Derby winning 2–0. Derby returned to England to round off their pre-season preparations with a 5–2 victory at Burton Albion in the Bass Vase, and 1–0 defeats to Segunda División side Girona and Scottish Premiership side Glasgow Rangers.

Following their failure to gain promotion the previous campaign, Derby set about reshaping the squad with three first team players, former club-record signing Bradley Johnson, Nick Blackman and Jacob Butterfield, leaving the club to join Blackburn Rovers, Maccabi Tel Aviv. and Luton Town respectively. Three players joined the club, Everton midfielder Kieran Dowell and Brighton & Hove Albion defender Matthew Clarke on season-long loans, with the sole permanent signing being Arsenal's Krystian Bielik for a potential club-record fee.

=== August ===
Derby started the season with a 2–1 victory away to recently relegated Huddersfield Town, with the result itself coming against a backdrop of rumours that Manchester United and England all-time leading scorer Wayne Rooney was on his way to the club on a player-coach deal. The deal was confirmed the following day, with Rooney signing a deal which would see him join the club following the end of the MLS season on a £100k-a-week deal, which would be partly subsidised by club-sponsor 32Red. The end of the transfer window on 8 August saw Derby sign Huddersfield Town goalkeeper Ben Hamer and Bristol City's Jamie Paterson on loan, with Scott Carson leaving on loan for Manchester City.

== Friendlies ==
=== Pre-season ===
In June 2019. The Rams announced their pre-season schedule.

10 July 2019 Friendly	Sarasota Metropolis (United States)	0–2	Derby County	Bradenton, Florida
23:00 BST		Report	Marriott 71', 77'	Stadium: IMG Academy; Attendance: N/A; Referee: N/A

14 July 2019 Friendly	Bristol City	1–2	Derby County	Bradenton, Florida
14:30 BST	Baker 57'	Report	Bennett 13'; Anya 43'	Stadium: IMG Academy; Attendance: N/A; Referee: N/A
Note: The game was originally due to be played on 13 July, but was abandoned at half-time due to extreme weather conditions. At the time, Bristol City were 1–0 up from a Famara Diedhiou goal. The game was rescheduled and played over 60 minutes.

20 July 2019 Bass Charity Vase	Burton Albion	2–5	Derby County	Burton-upon-Trent
15:00 BST	Brayford 22'; Fraser 51'		Waghorn 16', 26', 36'; Bennett 47'; Bird 90'	Stadium: Pirelli Stadium

25 July 2019 Friendly	Derby County	0–2	Girona	Derby
19:45 BST			Granell 11'; Soni 61'	Stadium: Pride Park Stadium

28 July 2019 Friendly	Rangers	1–0	Derby County	Glasgow
15:00 BST	Katić 83'			Stadium: Ibrox; Attendance: 19,843; Referee: Kevin Clancy

=== Mid-season ===
On 14 June 2020, ahead of the season's resumption following the enforced break during the COVID-19 pandemic, Derby County played two friendlies at Pride Park against fellow EFL Championship side Stoke City. The club had previously played an inter-squad friendly at Pride Park Stadium on 9 June 2020.

9 June 2020 Friendly	Derby County XI	1–3	Derby County XI	Derby
	Knight		Lawrence; Sibley; Whittaker	Stadium: Pride Park Stadium; Attendance: 0 Referee: N/A

14 June 2020 Friendly	Derby County	1–0	Stoke City	Derby
	Sibley			Stadium: Pride Park Stadium; Attendance: 0 Referee: N/A

14 June 2020 Friendly	Derby County	1–1	Stoke City	Derby
	Jozefzoon		Goal	Stadium: Pride Park Stadium; Attendance: 0 Referee: N/A

== Competitions ==
=== League table ===
Pos	Team	Pld	W	D	L	GF	GA	GD	Pts
7	Nottingham Forest	46	18	16	12	58	50	+8	70
8	Millwall	46	17	17	12	57	51	+6	68
9	Preston North End	46	18	12	16	59	54	+5	66
10	Derby County	46	17	13	16	62	64	−2	64
11	Blackburn Rovers	46	17	12	17	66	63	+3	63
12	Bristol City	46	17	12	17	60	65	−5	63
13	Queens Park Rangers	46	16	10	20	67	76	−9	58

Source: EFL Official Website
Rules for classification: 1) Points; 2) Goal difference; 3) Number of goals scored; 4) Head-to-head results; 5) Wins; 6) Away goals; 7) Penalty points (sec 9.5); 8) 12-point sending off offences

==== Results by matchday ====
Matchday	1	2	3	4	5	6	7	8	9	10	11	12	13	14	15	16	17	18	19	20	21	22	23	24	25	26	27	28	29	30	31	32	33	34	35	36	37	38	39	40	41	42	43	44	45	46
Ground	A	H	A	H	H	A	H	A	H	A	H	A	H	A	H	A	H	A	H	A	H	H	A	A	H	H	A	H	A	H	A	A	H	H	A	A	H	A	H	A	H	A	H	A	H	A
Result	W	D	D	L	D	L	D	D	W	D	W	L	W	L	W	L	W	L	D	L	D	L	L	D	W	W	D	W	L	W	W	L	D	D	L	W	W	W	W	W	D	L	L	L	L	W
Position	5	6	8	14	16	19	19	18	15	16	13	15	14	16	15	16	11	13	14	16	16	16	17	18	17	17	17	15	16	13	13	13	13	13	15	13	12	12	8	7	7	9	10	12	12	10

Updated to match(es) played on 22 July 2020. Source: BBC Sport
A = Away; H = Home; W = Win; D = Draw; L = Loss

==== Result summary ====
Overall								Home						Away					
Pld	W	D	L	GF	GA	GD	Pts	W	D	L	GF	GA	GD	W	D	L	GF	GA	GD
46	17	13	16	62	64	−2	64	11	8	4	33	21	+12	6	5	12	29	43	−14

Last updated: 22 July 2020.
Source: BBC Sport

==== Matches ====
On Thursday, 20 June 2019, the EFL Championship fixtures were revealed. Fixture dates and kick-off times are subject to change due to televised games.

On 13 March 2020, all professional football fixtures in the United Kingdom, including those of Derby County, were postponed until at least 3 April 2020 due to the ongoing COVID-19 pandemic. On 19 March 2020, this postponement was extended until at least 30 April 2020.

5 August 2019 1	Huddersfield Town	1–2	Derby County	Huddersfield
19:45 BST	Ahearne-Grant 30' (pen.)	Report	Lawrence 22', 25'	Stadium: John Smith's Stadium; Attendance: 22,596; Referee: Geoff Eltringham
Note: Live on Sky Sports

10 August 2019 2	Derby County	0–0	Swansea City	Derby
15:00 BST	Waghorn (penalty missed) 42'	Report		Stadium: Pride Park Stadium; Attendance: 27,337; Referee: Jarred Gillett

17 August 2019 3	Stoke City	2–2	Derby County	Stoke-on-Trent
15:00 BST	Lindsay 32'; Hogan 56'	Report	Waghorn 2', 70' (pen.)	Stadium: bet365 Stadium; Attendance: 23,863; Referee: Tim Robinson

20 August 2019 4	Derby County	1–2	Bristol City	Derby
19:45 BST	Marriott 85'	Report	Weimann 16'; Brownhill 45+1'	Stadium: Pride Park Stadium; Attendance: 25,546; Referee: Stephen Martin

24 August 2019 5	Derby County	1–1	West Bromwich Albion	Derby
12:30 BST	Waghorn 6' (pen.) (penalty missed) 43'	Report	Zohore 84' (pen.)	Stadium: Pride Park Stadium; Attendance: 26,718; Referee: Gavin Ward
Note: Live on Sky Sports

31 August 2019 6	Brentford	3–0	Derby County	Brentford
15:00 BST	Mbeumo 17'; Watkins 18', 45'	Report		Stadium: Griffin Park; Attendance: 11,055; Referee: David Webb

13 September 2019 7	Derby County	1–1	Cardiff City	Derby
19:45 BST	Malone 6'	Report	Glatzel 19' (pen.)	Stadium: Pride Park Stadium; Attendance: 25,873; Referee: Darren England
Note: Live on Sky Sports

21 September 2019 8	Leeds United	1–1	Derby County	Leeds
12:30 BST	Lowe 20' (o.g.); Klich (penalty missed) 70'	Report	Martin 90+1'	Stadium: Elland Road; Attendance: 34,741; Referee: Oliver Langford
Note: Live on Sky Sports

28 September 2019 9	Derby County	3–2	Birmingham City	Derby
15:00 BST	Martin 2'; Waghorn 50'; Paterson 74'	Report	Gardner 56'; Sunjic 59'; Jutkiewicz (penalty missed) 70'	Stadium: Pride Park Stadium; Attendance: 28,454; Referee: Simon Hooper

2 October 2019 10	Barnsley	2–2	Derby County	Barnsley
19:45 BST	Halme 13'; Woodrow 90+4'	Report	Martin 34'; Huddlestone 43' (pen.)	Stadium: Oakwell; Attendance: 13,634; Referee: Tony Harrington

5 October 2019 11	Derby County	2–0	Luton Town	Derby
15:00 BST	Pearson 11' (o.g.); Lawrence 70'			Stadium: Pride Park Stadium; Attendance: 27,944; Referee: Geoff Eltringham

19 October 2019 12	Charlton Athletic	3–0	Derby County	Charlton
15:00 BST	Bonne 6'; Sarr 48'; Gallagher 67'	Report		Stadium: The Valley; Attendance: 19,408; Referee: Stephen Martin

23 October 2019 13	Derby County	1–0	Wigan Athletic	Derby
19:45 BST	Shinnie 90+2'	Report		Stadium: Pride Park Stadium; Attendance: 24,697; Referee: Keith Stroud

26 October 2019 14	Hull City	2–0	Derby County	Kingston upon Hull
15:00 BST	Bowen 74', 80'	Report		Stadium: KCOM Stadium; Attendance: 16,326; Referee: Simon Hooper

2 November 2019 15	Derby County	2–0	Middlesbrough	Derby
15:00 GMT	Lawrence 22', 84'	Report	Saville (red card) 32'	Stadium: Pride Park Stadium; Attendance: 26,293; Referee: Darren Bond

9 November 2019 16	Nottingham Forest	1–0	Derby County	West Bridgford
12:30 GMT	Grabban 56'	Report		Stadium: City Ground; Referee: Darren England

23 November 2019 17	Derby County	1–0	Preston North End	Derby
15:00 GMT	Waghorn 33'	Report		Stadium: Pride Park Stadium; Attendance: 27,417; Referee: Tim Robinson

26 November 2019 18	Fulham	3–0	Derby County	Fulham
19:45 GMT	Decordova-Reid 7'; Mitrović 40'; Cairney 89'	Report		Stadium: Craven Cottage; Attendance: 16,856; Referee: Andy Woolmer

30 November 2019 19	Derby County	1–1	Queens Park Rangers	Derby
15:00 GMT	Waghorn 23'	Report	Eze 45+4' (pen.)	Stadium: Pride Park Stadium; Attendance: 26,289; Referee: David Webb

7 December 2019 20	Blackburn Rovers	1–0	Derby County	Blackburn
15:00 GMT	Armstrong 57'	Report		Stadium: Ewood Park; Attendance: 12,800; Referee: Oliver Langford

11 December 2019 21	Derby County	1–1	Sheffield Wednesday	Derby
19:45 GMT	Martin 82' (pen.)	Report	Fletcher 23'; Odubajo (yellow card) 60' (yellow-red card) 90'	Stadium: Pride Park Stadium; Attendance: 26,203; Referee: Steve Martin

14 December 2019 22	Derby County	0–1	Millwall	Derby
15:00 GMT		Report	Bradshaw 25'	Stadium: Pride Park Stadium; Attendance: 26,272; Referee: Chris Kavanagh

21 December 2019 23	Reading	3–0	Derby County	Reading
15:00 GMT	Adam 4' (pen.); João 58'; Méïté 86' (pen.)	Report	Malone (red card) 4'	Stadium: Madejski Stadium; Attendance: 14,831; Referee: Michael Salisbury

26 December 2019 24	Wigan Athletic	1–1	Derby County	Wigan
15:00 GMT	Garner 81'	Report	Waghorn 90+3'	Stadium: DW Stadium; Attendance: 14,211; Referee: Jarred Gillett

30 December 2019 25	Derby County	2–1	Charlton Athletic	Derby
19:45 GMT	Knight 10', 77'; Bielik (red card) 17'	Report	Taylor 83' (pen.)	Stadium: Pride Park Stadium; Attendance: 26,058; Referee: Jeremy Simpson
Note: Live on Sky Sports

2 January 2020 26	Derby County	2–1	Barnsley	Derby
19:45 GMT	Marriott 45'; Waghorn 57'	Report	Simões 50'	Stadium: Pride Park Stadium; Attendance: 27,782; Referee: Dean Whitestone
Note: Live on Sky Sports

11 January 2020 27	Middlesbrough	2–2	Derby County	Middlesbrough
15:00 GMT	Wing 16'; McNair 67' (pen.)	Report	Knight 54'; Holmes 90+1'	Stadium: Riverside Stadium; Attendance: 19,706; Referee: Tim Robinson

18 January 2020 28	Derby County	1–0	Hull City	Derby
15:00 GMT	Clarke 64'	Report		Stadium: Pride Park Stadium; Attendance: 27,412; Referee: Andy Woolmer

28 January 2020 29	Luton Town	3–2	Derby County	Luton
19:45 GMT	Mpanzu 67'; Daniels 73'; Bogle 86' (o.g.)	Report	Rooney 63'; Martin 85'; Lowe (red card) 88'	Stadium: Kenilworth Road; Attendance: 10,057; Referee: Andy Davies
Note: Fixture was postponed from 25 January due to Derby's FA Cup progression.

31 January 2020 30	Derby County	4–0	Stoke City	Derby
19:45 GMT	Waghorn 21'; Martin 24'; Rooney 67'; Bogle 74'	Report		Stadium: Pride Park Stadium; Attendance: 27,984; Referee: Robert Jones
Note: Live on Sky Sports

8 February 2020 31	Swansea City	2–3	Derby County	Swansea
15:00 GMT	Dhanda 56'; Naughton 58'	Report	Waghorn 8'; Holmes 64'; Lawrence 80'	Stadium: Liberty Stadium; Attendance: 16,230; Referee: Matt Donohue

12 February 2020 32	Bristol City	3–2	Derby County	Ashton Gate
19:45 GMT	Wells 38'; Benković 44'; Diédhiou 58'	Report	Waghorn 61'; Martin 82'	Stadium: Ashton Gate Stadium; Attendance: 20,368; Referee: Geoff Eltringham
Note: Live on Sky Sports

15 February 2020 33	Derby County	1–1	Huddersfield Town	Derby
15:00 GMT	Lawrence 61'	Report	Toffolo 81'	Stadium: Pride Park Stadium; Attendance: 27,502; Referee: Craig Pawson

21 February 2020 34	Derby County	1–1	Fulham	Derby
19:45 GMT	Rooney 55' (pen.)	Report	Mitrović 71'	Stadium: Pride Park Stadium; Attendance: 25,442; Referee: Darren Bond
Note: Live on Sky Sports

25 February 2020 35	Queens Park Rangers	2–1	Derby County	White City
19:45 GMT	Hall 34'; Chair 75'	Report	Waghorn 43'	Stadium: Loftus Road; Attendance: 11,669; Referee: Keith Stroud

29 February 2020 36	Sheffield Wednesday	1–3	Derby County	Owlerton
15:00 GMT	Windass 74'	Report	Lawrence 7', 24'; Knight 30'	Stadium: Hillsborough Stadium; Attendance: 25,148; Referee: Dean Whitestone

8 March 2020 37	Derby County	3–0	Blackburn Rovers	Derby
15:00 GMT	Sibley 26'; Martin 41', 85' (pen.)	Report	Buckley (red card) 90+3'	Stadium: Pride Park Stadium; Attendance: 26,590; Referee: John Brooks

20 June 2020 38	Millwall	2–3	Derby County	Bermondsey
13:00 BST	Smith 15'; Böðvarsson 90+3'	Report	Sibley 26', 71', 90'	Stadium: The Den; Attendance: N/A; Referee: Steve Martin
Note: Match played behind closed doors. Rescheduled from the original date of 14 March.

27 June 2020 39	Derby County	2–1	Reading	Derby
13:00 BST	Lawrence 44' (red card) 90+5'; Rooney 45+3' (pen.)	Report	Rinomhota 62'; Miazga (red card) 90+5'	Stadium: Pride Park Stadium; Attendance: N/A; Referee: Scott Duncan
Note: Match played behind closed doors. Rescheduled from the original date of 17 March.

1 July 2020 40	Preston North End	0–1	Derby County	Preston
17:00 BST		Report	Rooney 18'	Stadium: Deepdale; Attendance: N/A; Referee: Jarred Gillett
Note: Match played behind closed doors. Rescheduled from the original date of 21 March.

4 July 2020 41	Derby County	1–1	Nottingham Forest	Derby
12:30 BST	Waghorn (red card) 90+4'; Martin 90+7'	Report	Lolley 12'	Stadium: Pride Park Stadium; Attendance: N/A; Referee: Darren England
Note: Match played behind closed doors. Rescheduled from the original date of 4 April.

8 July 2020 42	West Bromwich Albion	2–0	Derby County	West Bromwich
20:00 BST	Diangana 11'; O'Shea 76'	Report	Sibley (red card) 90+1'	Stadium: The Hawthorns; Attendance: N/A; Referee: Jeremy Simpson
Note: Match played behind closed doors. Rescheduled from the original date of 10 April. Sibley's red card was later rescinded by the EFL.

11 July 2020 43	Derby County	1–3	Brentford	Derby
15:00 BST	Knight 29'	Report	Watkins 3'; Benrahma 49', 64'	Stadium: Pride Park Stadium; Attendance: N/A; Referee: Tim Robinson
Note: Match played behind closed doors. Rescheduled from the original date of 13 April.

14 July 2020 44	Cardiff City	2–1	Derby County	Cardiff
19:45 BST	Hoilett 17'; Tomlin 59'	Report	Knight 30'	Stadium: Cardiff City Stadium; Attendance: N/A; Referee: Darren Bond
Note: Match played behind closed doors. Rescheduled from the original date of 18 April.

19 July 2020 45	Derby County	1–3	Leeds United	Derby
14:00 BST	Martin 54'	Report	Hernández 56'; Shackleton 75'; Clarke 84' (o.g.)	Stadium: Pride Park Stadium; Attendance: N/A; Referee: Oliver Langford
Note: Match played behind closed doors. Rescheduled from the original date of 25 April.

22 July 2020 46	Birmingham City	1–3	Derby County	Bordesley
19:00 BST	Šunjić 56'	Report	Shinnie 6'; Whittaker 87'; Sibley 90+1'	Stadium: St Andrew's; Attendance: N/A; Referee: Tim Robinson
Note: Match played behind closed doors. Rescheduled from the original date of 2 May.

=== FA Cup ===
The third-round draw was made live on BBC Two from Etihad Stadium, Micah Richards and Tony Adams conducted the draw. Derby County were drawn away to Premier League side Crystal Palace. The fourth-round draw was made by Alex Scott and David O'Leary on Monday, 6 January.

5 January 2020 Third round	Crystal Palace	0–1	Derby County	Selhurst, London
14:01 GMT	Milivojevic (red card) 63'	Report	Martin 32'	Stadium: Selhurst Park; Attendance: 15,507; Referee: Michael Oliver

24 January 2020 Fourth round	Northampton Town	0–0	Derby County	Northampton
20:00 GMT		Report		Stadium: Sixfields Stadium; Attendance: 7,798; Referee: Darren England
Note: Live on BT Sport

4 February 2020 Fourth round replay	Derby County	4–2	Northampton Town	Derby
19:45 GMT	Wisdom 28'; Holmes 35'; Marriott 51'; Rooney 77' (pen.)	Report	Adams 47'; Hoskins 84' (pen.)	Stadium: Pride Park Stadium; Attendance: 15,860; Referee: David Webb

5 March 2020 Fifth round	Derby County	0–3	Manchester United	Derby
19:45 GMT		Report	Shaw 33'; Ighalo 41', 70'	Stadium: Pride Park Stadium; Attendance: 31,379; Referee: Craig Pawson
Note: Live on BT Sport

=== EFL Cup ===
The first-round draw was made on 20 June. The second-round draw was made on 13 August 2019 following the conclusion of all but one of the first-round matches.

13 August 2019 First round	Scunthorpe United	0–1	Derby County	Scunthorpe
19:45 BST		Report	Buchanan 78'	Stadium: Glanford Park; Attendance: 3,679; Referee: Robert Jones

27 August 2019 Second round	Nottingham Forest	3–0	Derby County	West Bridgford
19:45 BST	Adomah 25'; Lolley 35'; Carvalho 79'	Report		Stadium: City Ground; Attendance: 26,971; Referee: John Brooks

== Statistics ==
=== Appearances and goals ===
As of 22 July 2020

No.	Pos	Nat	Player	Total		Championship		League Cup		FA Cup	
No.	Pos	Nat	Player	Apps	Goals	Apps	Goals	Apps	Goals	Apps	Goals
Goalkeepers
12	GK	(England) ENG	Ben Hamer	27	0	24+1	0	2	0	0	0
21	GK	(Netherlands) NED	Kelle Roos	26	0	22	0	0	0	4	0
Defenders
2	DF	(England) ENG	Andre Wisdom	20	1	16+2	0	0	0	2	1
3	DF	(Scotland) SCO	Craig Forsyth	25	0	20+2	0	0	0	3	0
6	DF	(Republic of Ireland) IRL	Richard Keogh	8	0	8	0	0	0	0	0
16	DF	(England) ENG	Matthew Clarke	37	1	34+1	1	1	0	1	0
25	DF	(England) ENG	Max Lowe	31	0	24+5	0	1	0	1	0
33	DF	(England) ENG	Curtis Davies	37	0	25+7	0	2	0	3	0
37	DF	(England) ENG	Jayden Bogle	40	1	33+4	1	0	0	2+1	0
46	DF	(England) ENG	Scott Malone	21	1	15+3	1	0	0	3	0
48	DF	(England) ENG	Lee Buchanan	7	1	3+2	0	2	1	0	0
Midfielders
4	MF	(Scotland) SCO	Graeme Shinnie	27	2	12+11	2	2	0	1+1	0
5	MF	(Poland) POL	Krystian Bielik	21	0	19+1	0	1	0	0	0
7	MF	(England) ENG	Jamie Paterson	12	1	5+5	1	2	0	0	0
8	MF	(England) ENG	Kieran Dowell	10	0	8+2	0	0	0	0	0
10	MF	(Wales) WAL	Tom Lawrence	40	10	37	10	0	0	3	0
11	MF	(Netherlands) NED	Florian Jozefzoon	14	0	6+8	0	0	0	0	0
17	MF	(England) ENG	George Evans	20	0	11+6	0	1+1	0	1	0
23	MF	(United States) USA	Duane Holmes	36	3	29+4	2	1	0	1+1	1
32	MF	(England) ENG	Wayne Rooney	24	6	20	5	0	0	4	1
38	MF	(Republic of Ireland) IRL	Jason Knight	35	6	20+11	6	1	0	2+1	0
40	MF	(England) ENG	Louie Sibley	17	5	9+2	5	1+1	0	3+1	0
41	MF	(England) ENG	Max Bird	27	0	21+1	0	1+1	0	2+1	0
43	MF	(England) ENG	Jayden Mitchell-Lawson	1	0	0	0	0+1	0	0	0
44	MF	(England) ENG	Tom Huddlestone	12	1	11	1	0	0	1	0
51	FW	(England) ENG	Jordan Brown	1	0	0+1	0	0	0	0	0
Forwards
9	FW	(England) ENG	Martyn Waghorn	47	12	38+5	12	0	0	1+3	0
14	FW	(England) ENG	Jack Marriott	37	3	10+22	2	1+1	0	2+1	1
19	FW	(Scotland) SCO	Chris Martin	37	12	25+9	11	0	0	3	1
20	FW	(England) ENG	Mason Bennett	9	0	2+5	0	2	0	0	0
49	FW	(England) ENG	Morgan Whittaker	21	1	1+15	1	1+1	0	1+2	0
52	FW	(England) ENG	Jahmal Hector-Ingram	1	0	0+1	0	0	0	0	0

=== Goal scorers ===
As of 22 July 2020

Rank	No.	Nat.	Po.	Name	Championship	FA Cup	League Cup	Total
1	9	(England)	FW	Martyn Waghorn	12	0	0	12
1	19	(England)	FW	Chris Martin	11	1	0	12
3	10	(Wales)	MF	Tom Lawrence	10	0	0	10
4	32	(England)	FW	Wayne Rooney	5	1	0	6
4	38	(Republic of Ireland)	MF	Jason Knight	6	0	0	6
6	40	(England)	MF	Louie Sibley	5	0	0	5
7	14	(England)	FW	Jack Marriott	2	1	0	3
7	23	(United States)	MF	Duane Holmes	2	1	0	3
9	4	(Scotland)	MF	Graeme Shinnie	2	0	0	2
10	2	(England)	DF	Andre Wisdom	0	1	0	1
10	7	(England)	MF	Jamie Paterson	1	0	0	1
10	16	(England)	DF	Matthew Clarke	1	0	0	1
10	32	(England)	DF	Jayden Bogle	1	0	0	1
10	44	(England)	MF	Tom Huddlestone	1	0	0	1
10	46	(England)	DF	Scott Malone	1	0	0	1
10	48	(England)	DF	Lee Buchanan	0	0	1	1
10	52	(England)	FW	Morgan Whittaker	1	0	0	1
Own goals					1	0	0	1
Total					62	5	1	68

=== Assists record ===
As of 22 July 2020

Rank	No.	Nat.	Po.	Name	Championship	FA Cup	League Cup	Total
1	19	(England)	FW	Chris Martin	6	0	0	6
1	37	(England)	DF	Jayden Bogle	5	1	0	6
3	3	(Scotland)	DF	Craig Forsyth	3	0	0	3
3	9	(England)	FW	Martyn Waghorn	3	0	0	3
3	10	(Wales)	MF	Tom Lawrence	3	0	0	3
3	23	(United States)	MF	Duane Holmes	3	0	0	3
3	32	(England)	FW	Wayne Rooney	3	0	0	3
8	7	(England)	MF	Jamie Paterson	2	0	0	2
8	17	(England)	MF	George Evans	1	0	1	2
8	41	(England)	MF	Max Bird	2	0	0	2
8	40	(England)	MF	Louie Sibley	2	0	0	2
12	2	(England)	DF	Andre Wisdom	1	0	0	1
12	8	(England)	MF	Kieran Dowell	1	0	0	1
12	11	(Netherlands)	FW	Florian Jozefzoon	1	0	0	1
12	14	(England)	FW	Jack Marriott	1	0	0	1
12	25	(England)	DF	Max Lowe	1	0	0	1
12	33	(England)	DF	Curtis Davies	1	0	0	1
12	52	(England)	FW	Morgan Whittaker	1	0	0	1
Total					40	1	1	42

== Transfers ==
=== Transfers in ===
Date	Position	Nationality	Name	From	Fee	Ref.
1 July 2019	DM	SCO	Graeme Shinnie	Aberdeen (SCO)	Free transfer	
3 July 2019	CF	ENG	Osazee Aghatise	Manchester City (ENG)	Undisclosed	
2 August 2019	CB	POL	Krystian Bielik	Arsenal (ENG)	Undisclosed	
12 August 2019	CF	ENG	Jahmal Hector-Ingram	West Ham United (ENG)	Free transfer	
1 January 2020	CF	ENG	Wayne Rooney	D.C. United (USA)	Undisclosed	

=== Loans in ===
Date from	Position	Nationality	Name	From	Date until	Ref.
11 July 2019	AM	ENG	Kieran Dowell	Everton (ENG)	3 January 2020	
2 August 2019	CB	ENG	Matthew Clarke	Brighton & Hove Albion (ENG)	30 June 2020	
8 August 2019	GK	ENG	Ben Hamer	Huddersfield Town (ENG)	30 June 2020	
8 August 2019	SS	ENG	Jamie Paterson	Bristol City (ENG)	1 January 2020	
31 January 2020	CF	ENG	Rushian Hepburn-Murphy	Aston Villa (ENG)	30 June 2020	

=== Loans out ===
Date from	Position	Nationality	Name	To	Date until	Ref.
8 August 2019	GK	ENG	Scott Carson	Manchester City (ENG)	30 June 2020	
19 August 2019	DM	ENG	George Thorne	Oxford United (ENG)	January 2020	
4 September 2019	CB	ENG	Max Hunt	Aldershot Town (ENG)	4 January 2020	
24 September 2019	AM	WAL	Alex Babos	FC United of Manchester (ENG)	October 2019	
5 October 2019	GK	ENG	Matthew Yates	AFC Telford United (ENG)	30 June 2020	
26 October 2019	GK	ENG	Sam French	Stevenage (ENG)	2 November 2019	
14 November 2019	GK	ENG	Sam French	Hyde United (ENG)	December 2019	
20 December 2019	CF	ENG	Javaun Splatt	Carshalton Athletic (ENG)	January 2020	
6 January 2020	AM	ENG	Jayden Mitchell-Lawson	Bristol Rovers (ENG)	30 June 2020	
21 January 2020	GK	ENG	Jonathan Mitchell	Macclesfield Town (ENG)	30 June 2020	
30 January 2020	SS	ENG	Mason Bennett	Millwall (ENG)	30 June 2020	
31 January 2020	GK	ENG	Joshua Barnes	Farsley Celtic (ENG)	29 February 2020	

=== Transfers out ===
Date	Position	Nationality	Name	To	Fee	Ref.
1 July 2019	CB	NGA	Efe Ambrose	Free agent	Released	
1 July 2019	CM	SCO	Craig Bryson	Aberdeen (SCO)	Free transfer	
1 July 2019	LB	ENG	Ashley Cole	Retired		
1 July 2019	CM	SVN	Timi Elšnik	Free agent	Released	
1 July 2019	RB	ENG	Aaron Eyoma	Aldershot Town (ENG)	Released	
1 July 2019	CB	SVN	Sven Karič	NK Domžale (SVN)	Released	
1 July 2019	CF	ENG	David Nugent	Preston North End (ENG)	Released	
1 July 2019	LB	SWE	Marcus Olsson	Free agent	Released	
1 July 2019	CB	IRL	Alex Pearce	Millwall (ENG)	Released	
1 July 2019	CB	SWE	Fuseine Rashid	Brommapojkarna (SWE)	Released	
1 July 2019	RW	ENG	Luke Thomas	Barnsley (ENG)	Undisclosed	
5 July 2019	CM	ENG	Bradley Johnson	Blackburn Rovers (ENG)	Free transfer	
12 July 2019	DF	ENG	Panashe Makokowe	Swansea City (WAL)	Undisclosed	
12 July 2019	MF	ENG	Adnaan Moti	Swansea City (WAL)	Undisclosed	
16 July 2019	CF	ENG	Liam Delap	Manchester City (ENG)	Undisclosed	
18 July 2019	RW	BRB	Nick Blackman	Maccabi Tel Aviv (ISR)	Undisclosed	
25 July 2019	RM	ENG	Kellan Gordon	Mansfield Town (ENG)	Undisclosed	
30 July 2019	CM	ENG	Jacob Butterfield	Luton Town (ENG)	Free transfer	
9 August 2019	RW	SCO	Kyle McAllister	St Mirren (SCO)	Undisclosed	
27 August 2019	LB	SCO	Calum MacDonald	Blackpool (ENG)	Free transfer	
30 October 2019	CB	IRL	Richard Keogh	Sacked		
10 January 2020	CB	ENG	Max Hunt	Carlisle United (ENG)	Undisclosed	
22 January 2020	DM	ENG	George Thorne	Oxford United (ENG)	Undisclosed	
