= 2023–24 Derby County F.C. season =

140th season in existence of Derby County FC

Derby County
2023–24 season
- Owner: Clowes Developments
- Head Coach: Paul Warne
- Stadium: Pride Park Stadium
- League One: 2nd (promoted)
- FA Cup: First round
- EFL Cup: First round
- EFL Trophy: Round of 16
- Top goalscorer: League: James Collins (14); All: James Collins (19)
- Highest home attendance: 32,538 vs Bolton Wanderers, 16 March 2024, League One
- Lowest home attendance: 1,952 vs Wolverhampton Wanderers U21, 8 November 2023, EFL Trophy
- Average home league attendance: 27,278
- Biggest win: 4–0 vs Northampton Town (H), 31 October 2023, League One
- Biggest defeat: 0–2 vs Blackpool (H), 8 August 2023, EFL Cup; 1–3 vs Stevenage (A), 28 October 2023, League One; 1–3 vs Crewe Alexandra (H), 14 November 2023, FA Cup
Home colours	Away colours	Third colours

The 2023–24 season was the 140th season in the history of Derby County and their second consecutive season in League One. In addition to the league, the club also competed in the FA Cup, the EFL Cup and the EFL Trophy.

After a slow start to the season which saw the pre-season promotion favourites eight points off of the promotion places with a third of the season gone, Derby's form improved and a mid-season run of 14 wins from 19 games between late-October and mid-February took them into second place and the automatic promotion spots, a position they would not relinquish. A 2–0 home win over already-relegated Carlisle United on the final day of the season confirmed the club's first automatic promotion in 28 years and saw them return to the Football League Championship at the second attempt. Along the way, the team set club records for points in a season (92, eclipsing the 85 achieved in 2013–14) and most away wins (13, eclipising the twelve away wins in 2004-05 and 2006-07), and equalled the club record for most wins in a single league campaign (28, matching that of the 1955–56 season).

== Squad at the end of the season ==
As of 20 March 2024

No.	Name	Position	Nationality	Date of birth (age)	Previous club	Date signed	Fee	Contract end
Goalkeepers
1	Joe Wildsmith	GK	(England)	28 December 1995 (aged 28)	Sheffield Wednesday	2 July 2022	Free	30 June 2024
13	Scott Loach	GK	(England)	27 May 1988 (aged 36)	Chesterfield	13 July 2022	Free	30 June 2024
31	Josh Vickers	GK	(England)	1 December 1995 (aged 28)	Rotherham United	1 July 2023	Free	30 June 2026
Defenders
2	Kane Wilson	RB	(England)	11 March 2000 (aged 24)	Bristol City	11 July 2023	Undisclosed	30 June 2025
3	Craig Forsyth	LB	(Scotland)	24 February 1989 (aged 35)	Watford	1 July 2013	£150,000	30 June 2024
5	Sonny Bradley	CB	(England)	13 September 1991 (aged 32)	Luton Town	7 July 2023	Free	30 June 2025
6	Eiran Cashin	CB	(Republic of Ireland)	9 November 2001 (aged 22)	Academy	1 January 2022	—N/a	30 June 2027
20	Callum Elder	LB	(Australia)	27 January 1995 (aged 29)	Hull City	1 July 2023	Free	30 June 2026
24	Ryan Nyambe	RB	(Namibia)	4 December 1997 (aged 26)	Wigan Athletic	19 September 2023	Free	30 June 2025
34	Jake Rooney	CB	(England)	22 August 2003 (aged 20)	Burnley	8 August 2022	Free	30 June 2026
35	Curtis Nelson	CB	(England)	21 May 1993 (aged 31)	Blackpool	1 July 2023	Free	30 June 2025
41	Daniel Cox	CB	(Wales)	30 January 2006 (age 20)	Academy	1 July 2022	—N/a	30 June 2024
46	Adisa Osayande	CB	(England)	8 October 2006 (aged 17)	Academy	13 July 2023	—N/a	30 June 2025
Midfielders
4	Conor Hourihane	CM	(Republic of Ireland)	2 February 1991 (aged 33)	Aston Villa	6 July 2022	Free	30 June 2024
8	Max Bird	DM	(England)	18 September 2000 (aged 23)	Bristol City	1 February 2024	Loan	31 May 2024
12	Korey Smith	CM	(England)	31 January 1991 (aged 33)	(Wales) Swansea City	16 July 2022	Free	30 June 2024
16	Liam Thompson	DM	(England)	29 April 2002 (aged 22)	Academy	1 January 2022	—N/a	30 June 2024
17	Louie Sibley	CM	(England)	13 September 2001 (aged 22)	Academy	1 January 2020	—N/a	30 June 2024
22	Tyrese Fornah	CM	(Sierra Leone)	11 September 1999 (aged 24)	Nottingham Forest	25 August 2023	Undisclosed	30 June 2025
23	Joe Ward	RM	(England)	22 August 1995 (aged 28)	Peterborough United	1 July 2023	Free	30 June 2026
26	Darren Robinson	DM	(Northern Ireland)	29 December 2004 (aged 19)	(Northern Ireland) Dungannon Swifts	1 July 2021	Free	30 June 2024
32	Ebou Adams	CM	(The Gambia)	15 January 1996 (aged 28)	(Wales) Cardiff City	31 January 2024	Loan	31 May 2024
36	Ben Radcliffe	DM	(England)	11 July 2004 (aged 19)	Burton Albion	7 July 2023	Free	30 June 2024
38	Cruz Allen	CM	(Wales)	25 February 2007 (aged 17)	Academy	1 July 2023	—N/a	30 June 2026
42	Adebayo Fapetu	CM	(England)	18 January 2005 (aged 19)	Arsenal	1 July 2021	Free	30 June 2024
Forwards
7	Tom Barkhuizen	LW	(England)	4 July 1993 (aged 30)	Preston North End	2 July 2022	Free	30 June 2024
9	James Collins	CF	(Republic of Ireland)	1 December 1990 (aged 33)	(Wales) Cardiff City	13 July 2022	Free	30 June 2024
10	Martyn Waghorn	CF	(England)	23 January 1990 (aged 34)	Coventry City	7 August 2023	Free	30 June 2024
11	Nathaniel Mendez-Laing	RW	(Guatemala)	15 April 1992 (aged 32)	Sheffield Wednesday	2 July 2022	Free	30 June 2026
14	Conor Washington	CF	(Northern Ireland)	18 May 1992 (aged 32)	Rotherham United	7 July 2023	Undisclosed	30 June 2025
19	Tyreece John-Jules	CF	(England)	14 February 2001 (aged 23)	Arsenal	25 August 2023	Loan	31 May 2024
25	Dwight Gayle	CF	(England)	17 October 1989 (aged 34)	Stoke City	19 February 2024	Free	30 June 2024
27	Corey Blackett-Taylor	RW	(England)	23 September 1997 (aged 26)	Charlton Athletic	22 January 2024	Loan	31 May 2024
43	Tony Weston	CF	(England)	17 September 2003 (age 23)	(Scotland) Rangers	1 August 2023	Free	30 June 2024
45	Lennon Wheeldon	CF	(England)	16 February 2006 (aged 18)	Academy	1 July 2022	—N/a	30 June 2024
Out on loan
39	Dajaune Brown	CF	(Jamaica)	16 October 2005 (aged 18)	Academy	1 July 2022	—N/a	30 June 2026

- Includes all players who made at least one competitive appearance during the season

== Transfers ==
=== In ===
Date	Pos	Player	Transferred from	Fee	Ref
1 July 2023	LB	(Australia) Callum Elder	(England) Hull City	Free Transfer	
1 July 2023	CB	(England) Curtis Nelson	(England) Blackpool	Free Transfer	
1 July 2023	GK	(England) Josh Vickers	(England) Rotherham United	Free Transfer	
1 July 2023	RM	(England) Joe Ward	(England) Peterborough United	Free Transfer	
7 July 2023	CB	(England) Ryan Bartley †	(England) Crystal Palace	Free Transfer	
7 July 2023	CB	(England) Sonny Bradley	(England) Luton Town	Free Transfer	
7 July 2023	DM	(England) Ben Radcliffe †	(England) Burton Albion	Free Transfer	
7 July 2023	CF	(Northern Ireland) Conor Washington	(England) Rotherham United	Undisclosed	
11 July 2023	RB	(England) Kane Wilson	(England) Bristol City	Undisclosed	
18 July 2023	CM	(England) Bradley Johnson † (Note: Signed as an overage player-coach for Derby County's under-21 team)	(England) Milton Keynes Dons	Free Transfer	
1 August 2023	AM	(Northern Ireland) Charlie Lindsay †	(Scotland) Rangers	Free Transfer	
1 August 2023	GK	(Wales) Lewis Ridd †	(England) Ipswich Town	Free Transfer	
1 August 2023	CF	(England) Tony Weston †	(Scotland) Rangers	Free Transfer	
7 August 2023	CF	(England) Martyn Waghorn	(England) Coventry City	Free Transfer	
25 August 2023	CM	(Sierra Leone) Tyrese Fornah	(England) Nottingham Forest	Undisclosed	
1 September 2023	RM	(England) Alex Gibson-Hammond †	(England) Nottingham Forest	Free Transfer	
19 September 2023	RB	(Namibia) Ryan Nyambe	Free agent	Free Transfer	
23 January 2024	RW	(England) Eno Nto †	(United States) Notre Dame Fighting Irish	Free Transfer	
19 February 2024	CF	(England) Dwight Gayle	Free agent	Free Transfer	

† Signed for Under-21s

=== Out ===
Date	Pos	Player	Transferred to	Fee	Ref
29 June 2023	DM	(Poland) Krystian Bielik	(England) Birmingham City	Undisclosed	
30 June 2023	CM	(England) Osazee Aghatise	Free agent	Released	
30 June 2023	RB	(England) Rhys Brailsford	(England) Barwell	Free Transfer	
30 June 2023	LB	(England) Demico Burton	Free agent	Released	
30 June 2023	CB	(Wales) James Chester	(England) Barrow	Free Transfer	
30 June 2023	CF	(Poland) Bartosz Cybulski	(England) King's Lynn Town	Free Transfer	
30 June 2023	CB	(England) Curtis Davies	(England) Cheltenham Town	Free Transfer	
30 June 2023	CM	(England) Connor Dixon	(England) Ilkeston Town	Free Transfer	
30 June 2023	GK	(England) Harrison Foulkes	(England) Eastbourne Borough	Free Transfer	
30 June 2023	LB	(England) Will Grewal-Pollard	(England) Alfreton Town	Free Transfer	
30 June 2023	CM	(Republic of Ireland) Olamide Ibrahim	Free agent	Released	
30 June 2023	LB	(Republic of Ireland) Cian Kelly	Free agent	Released	
30 June 2023	AM	(England) Sonny Blu Lo-Everton	(England) Yeovil Town	Free Transfer	
30 June 2023	CF	(Republic of Ireland) David McGoldrick	(England) Notts County	Free Transfer	
30 June 2023	GK	(England) Alfie Roberts	Free agent	Released	
30 June 2023	CB	(England) Harrison Solomon	(United States) UNH Wildcats	Free Transfer	
30 June 2023	CB	(England) Richard Stearman	(England) Solihull Moors	Free Transfer	
11 July 2023	CM	(Republic of Ireland) Jason Knight	(England) Bristol City	Undisclosed	
1 February 2024	DM	(England) Max Bird	(England) Bristol City	Undisclosed	

=== Loaned in ===
Date	Pos	Player	Loaned from	Date until	Ref
25 August 2023	CF	(England) Tyreece John-Jules	(England) Arsenal	End of Season (Note: On 19 January, John-Jules' loan from Arsenal was extended until the end of season.)	
1 September 2023	AM	(England) Elliot Embleton	(England) Sunderland	10 January 2024 (Note: On 10 January, Embleton's season long loan was terminated early by Derby.)	
1 September 2023	LB	(England) Henry Jeffcott †	(England) Arsenal	End of Season	
22 January 2024	RW	(England) Corey Blackett-Taylor	(England) Charlton Athletic	End of Season	
31 January 2024	CM	(The Gambia) Ebou Adams	(Wales) Cardiff City	End of Season	
1 February 2024	DM	(England) Max Bird	(England) Bristol City	End of Season	

† Signed for Under-21s

=== Loaned out ===
Date	Pos	Player	Loaned to	Date until	Ref
5 July 2023	RB	(England) Kwaku Oduroh	(England) Rochdale	10 January 2024 (Note: On 10 January, Oduroh's season long loan was terminated early by Rochdale.)	
3 August 2023	CF	(Republic of Ireland) George Nunn	(England) Mickleover	2 October 2023 (Note: On 1 September, Nunn's loan at Mickleover was extended by a further month.)	
4 August 2023	GK	(England) Harry Evans	(England) Coalville Town	31 August 2023	
21 September 2023	CF	(Republic of Ireland) George Nunn	(England) Braintree Town	21 October 2023	
21 September 2023	CF	(Republic of Ireland) Owen Oseni	(England) Nuneaton Borough	1 January 2024 (Note: On 21 November, Oseni's loan at Nuneaton Borough was extended until 1 January 2024.)	
13 October 2023	GK	(England) Harry Evans	(England) Barwell	14 February 2024 (Note: On 19 January, Evans' loan at Barwell was extended by a further month.)	
2 November 2023	CF	(Republic of Ireland) George Nunn	(England) Hampton & Richmond Borough	1 January 2024	
14 November 2023	CM	(England) Jack Bates	(England) Hastings United	14 December 2023	
21 November 2023	RM	(England) Alex Gibson-Hammond	(England) Buxton	1 January 2024	
26 December 2023	GK	(Wales) Lewis Ridd	(England) Mickleover	End of Season (Note: On 19 January, Ridd's loan at Mickleover was extended until the end of season.)	
12 January 2024	AM	(Northern Ireland) Charlie Lindsay	(Northern Ireland) Glentoran	End of Season	
18 January 2024	RB	(England) Callum Moore	(England) Matlock Town	15 February 2024	
23 January 2024	CF	(Jamaica) Dajaune Brown	(England) Gateshead	End of Season	

== Pre-season and friendlies ==
On 19 May, Derby announced their first pre-season friendly, against Matlock Town. Less than a week later, a second fixture was confirmed against Stoke City to celebrate Craig Forsyth's association with the club. On June 1, a trip to face Chesterfield and a visit from Sheffield United was added to the pre-season calendar. A training camp in Alicante was also confirmed along with a fixture against Salford City.

Win Draw Loss Fixtures

8 July 2023 Friendly	Matlock Town	0–2	Derby County	Matlock
15:00 BST		Report	Collins 39'; Radcliffe 90'	Stadium: Causeway Lane; Attendance: 2,300

15 July 2023 Friendly	Salford City	1–1	Derby County	San Pedro del Pinatar, Spain
12:00 CEST; 11:00 BST	Bailey 50'	Report	Mendez-Laing 58'	Stadium: Pinatar Arena

19 July 2023 Friendly	Chesterfield	0–1	Derby County	Chesterfield
15:00 BST		Report	Collins 60'	Stadium: Technique Stadium

22 July 2023 Craig Forsyth Testimonial	Derby County	3–0	Stoke City	Derby
15:00 BST	Nelson 19'; Collins 26'; Mendez-Laing 40'	Report		Stadium: Pride Park Stadium; Attendance: 9,119 (1,349 Stoke City supporters)

29 July 2023 Friendly	Derby County	1–3	Sheffield United	Derby
15:00 BST	Smith 58'	Report	Ben Slimane 18'; Baldock 82'; Ndiaye 84'	Stadium: Pride Park Stadium; Attendance: 7,406 (inc. 1,648 away supporters)

== Competitions ==
=== Overall record ===
Competition	Starting round	Final position	Record							
Competition	Starting round	Final position	Pld	W	D	L	GF	GA	GD	Win %
League One	Matchday 1	2nd (promoted)	46	28	8	10	79	37	+42	60.87
FA Cup	First round	First round	2	0	1	1	3	5	−2	0.00
EFL Cup	First round	First round	1	0	0	1	0	2	−2	0.00
EFL Trophy	Group stage	Round of 16	5	4	0	1	11	3	+8	80.00
Total			54	32	9	13	93	47	+46	59.26

Last updated: 27 April 2024
Source: Soccerway

=== League One ===
==== League table ====
Pos	Team	Pld	W	D	L	GF	GA	GD	Pts	Promotion, qualification or relegation
1	Portsmouth (C, P)	46	28	13	5	78	41	+37	97	Promotion to EFL Championship
2	Derby County (P)	46	28	8	10	78	37	+41	92	Promotion to EFL Championship
3	Bolton Wanderers	46	25	12	9	86	51	+35	87	Qualification for League One play-offs
4	Peterborough United	46	25	9	12	89	61	+28	84	Qualification for League One play-offs
5	Oxford United (O, P)	46	22	11	13	79	56	+23	77	Qualification for League One play-offs
6	Barnsley	46	21	13	12	82	64	+18	76	Qualification for League One play-offs

Source: EFL Official Website
Rules for classification: 1) Points; 2) Goal difference; 3) Number of goals scored; 4) Head-to-head results; 5) Wins; 6) Away goals; 7) Penalty points (sec 9.5); 8) 12-point sending off offences
(C) Champions; (O) Play-off winners; (P) Promoted

==== Results summary ====
Overall								Home						Away					
Pld	W	D	L	GF	GA	GD	Pts	W	D	L	GF	GA	GD	W	D	L	GF	GA	GD
46	28	8	10	78	37	+41	92	15	4	4	41	18	+23	13	4	6	37	19	+18

Last updated: 27 April 2024.
Source: Soccerway

==== Results by round ====
Round	1	2	3	4	5	6	8	9	10	11	12	14	15	16	7 (Note: Matchday 7, vs Northampton Town (H), was postponed due to international call-ups.)	17	19	20	21	22	23	24	25	26	27	28	29	18 (Note: Matchday 18, vs Reading (A), was postponed due to international call-ups.)	30	31	32	33	34	35	13 (Note: Matchday 13, vs Charlton Athletic (H), was postponed due to international call-ups.)	36	37	38	39	40	41	42	43	44	45	46
Ground	H	A	H	H	A	A	H	A	H	A	A	A	H	A	H	H	H	A	A	H	H	A	A	H	A	H	A	A	H	A	H	A	H	A	H	H	A	H	H	A	H	A	A	H	A	H
Result	L	W	L	W	W	L	D	W	D	W	D	L	W	L	W	W	W	W	W	D	W	W	W	L	W	W	D	L	W	W	D	W	W	L	L	W	W	W	W	L	W	D	D	W	W	W
Position	14	9	14	10	8	11	11	9	12	7	8	11	8	9	7	7	6	6	5	6	4	4	4	4	4	3	3	4	4	2	2	2	2	2	2	2	2	2	2	2	2	2	2	2	2	2

Updated to match(es) played on 27 April 2024. Source: Soccerway
A = Away; H = Home; W = Win; D = Draw; L = Loss; P = Postponed

==== Matches ====
On 22 June, the EFL League One fixtures were released.

Win Draw Loss Fixtures

5 August 2023 1	Derby County	1–2	Wigan Athletic	Derby
15:00 BST	Smith (yellow card) 37'; Cashin (yellow card) 48'; Forsyth 57'	Report	Wyke 37', 72'; Hughes (yellow card) 49'; Smith (yellow card) 88'	Stadium: Pride Park Stadium; Attendance: 29,957; Referee: Scott Oldham

12 August 2023 2	Burton Albion	0–3	Derby County	Burton upon Trent
15:00 BST	Seddon (yellow card) 2'	Report	Collins 7'; Mendez-Laing (yellow card) 45+2'; Hourihane (yellow card) 68', (goal) 78'; Washington 84'; Cashin (yellow card) 90+6'	Stadium: Pirelli Stadium; Attendance: 6,410; Referee: James Bell

15 August 2023 3	Derby County	1–2	Oxford United	Derby
19:45 BST	Collins (yellow card) 27'; Bird (yellow card) 37'; Hourihane (yellow card) 42'; Wilson (yellow card) 68'; Cashin (yellow card) 82'; Waghorn 87'	Report	Harris 32', 72'; Long (yellow card) 52'; Beadle (yellow card) 90+1'	Stadium: Pride Park Stadium; Attendance: 25,292; Referee: Ben Toner

19 August 2023 4	Derby County	1–0	Fleetwood Town	Derby
15:00 BST	Waghorn 23', (yellow card) 55'; Mendez-Laing (yellow card) 30'; Thompson (yellow card) 40'	Report	Mayor (yellow card) 39'; Johnston (yellow card) 69'; Quitirna (yellow card) 90+2'	Stadium: Pride Park Stadium; Attendance: 24,565; Referee: Mark Jones

26 August 2023 5	Peterborough United	2–4	Derby County	Peterborough
15:00 BST	Clarke-Harris 23'; Burrows (yellow card) 39'; Kioso (yellow card) 67'; Poku 90'	Report	Waghorn 29', 40', 45'; Cashin 37'; Forsyth (yellow card) 86'	Stadium: Weston Homes Stadium; Attendance: 7,133; Referee: Andrew Hickman

2 September 2023 6	Bolton Wanderers	2–1	Derby County	Horwich
15:00 BST	Charles 43' (pen.); Santos (yellow card) 60'; Dacres-Cogley 65'; Thomason (yellow card) 70'; Williams (yellow card) 84'	Report	Hourihane 34' (pen.); Smith (yellow card) 43'; Wildsmith (red card) 48'; Forsyth (yellow card) 70'	Stadium: Toughsheet Community Stadium; Attendance: 21,754; Referee: Charles Breakspear

16 September 2023 8	Derby County	1–1	Portsmouth	Derby
15:00 BST	Fornah (yellow card) 26'; Collins 86' (pen.), (yellow card) 88'	Report	Pack (yellow card) 10'; Poole (yellow card) 28'; Robertson (yellow card) 65'; Bishop 90+5'	Stadium: Pride Park Stadium; Attendance: 27,999; Referee: Rebecca Welch

23 September 2023 9	Carlisle United	0–2	Derby County	Carlisle
15:00 BST	Lavelle (yellow card) 90+4'	Report	Collins 18', 84' (pen.); Cashin (yellow card) 75'	Stadium: Brunton Park; Attendance: 11,186; Referee: Martin Coy

30 September 2023 10	Derby County	0–0	Cambridge United	Derby
15:00 BST	Nyambe (yellow card) 75'; Collins (yellow card) 83'	Report	Gordon (yellow card) 72'; Bennett (yellow card) 85'	Stadium: Pride Park Stadium; Attendance: 26,122; Referee: Ollie Yates

3 October 2023 11	Blackpool	1–3	Derby County	Blackpool
19:45 BST	Connolly (yellow card) 30'; Dougall 73'	Report	Forsyth (yellow card) 32'; Smith 54'; Collins 71'; Waghorn 89'	Stadium: Bloomfield Road; Attendance: 11,137; Referee: Will Finnie

7 October 2023 12	Cheltenham Town	1–1	Derby County	Cheltenham
15:00 BST	Street 39'; Bradbury (yellow card) 70'	Report	Nelson 45+7'	Stadium: The Completely-Suzuki Stadium; Attendance: 5,292; Referee: Peter Wright

21 October 2023 14	Shrewsbury Town	1–0	Derby County	Shrewsbury
15:00 BST	Hourihane 56' (o.g.); Flanagan (yellow card) 86'	Report	Nelson (yellow card) 86'; Bradley (yellow card) 90+6'	Stadium: The Croud Meadow; Attendance: 8,088; Referee: Martin Woods

24 October 2023 15	Derby County	2–0	Exeter City	Derby
19:45 BST	Mendez-Laing 30'; Hourihane (yellow card) 34'; Sibley (yellow card) 55'; Washington 79'	Report	Watts (yellow card) 62'	Stadium: Pride Park Stadium; Attendance: 24,040; Referee: Sunny Gill

28 October 2023 16	Stevenage	3–1	Derby County	Stevenage
15:00 BST	Roberts 32'; MacDonald 45+2'; Reid (yellow card) 59'; Piergianni (yellow card) 71'; Hemmings 84'	Report	Cashin (yellow card) 11'; Forsyth (yellow card) 30'; Mendez-Laing 38'	Stadium: Lamex Stadium; Attendance: 5,866; Referee: Thomas Kirk

31 October 2023 7	Derby County	4–0	Northampton Town	Derby
19:45 GMT	Bird 14', 32'; Washington 22', (yellow card) 57'; Mendez-Laing 49'	Report	Brough (yellow card) 2'; Odimayo (yellow card) 71'	Stadium: Pride Park Stadium; Attendance: 24,719; Referee: Simon Mather
Note: Originally scheduled for 9 September 2023, this match was postponed due to international call-ups.

11 November 2023 17	Derby County	3–0	Barnsley	Derby
15:00 GMT	Collins (yellow card) 17', (goal) 35' (pen.), 63'; Forsyth (yellow card) 36', (goal) 48'	Report	Russell (yellow card) 66'	Stadium: Pride Park Stadium; Attendance: 28,019; Referee: John Busby

25 November 2023 19	Derby County	2–1	Bristol Rovers	Derby
15:00 GMT	Hunt 66' (o.g.); Mendez-Laing 90'	Report	Martin 87'	Stadium: Pride Park Stadium; Attendance: 26,623; Referee: Tom Reeves

28 November 2023 20	Port Vale	0–1	Derby County	Burslem
19:45 GMT	Iacovitti (yellow card) 71'; Loft (yellow card) 84'	Report	John-Jules 77'	Stadium: Vale Park; Attendance: 8,062; Referee: Paul Howard

9 December 2023 21	Leyton Orient	0–3	Derby County	Leyton
15:00 GMT	Cooper (red card) 44'; El Mizouni (yellow card) 47'	Report	Hourihane (yellow card) 8'; Sibley 34'; Mendez-Laing 47'; Barkhuizen 79'	Stadium: Brisbane Road; Attendance: 8,499; Referee: David Rock

16 December 2023 22	Derby County	1–1	Wycombe Wanderers	Derby
15:00 GMT	Sibley (yellow card) 14'; Mendez-Laing (yellow card) 15'; Hourihane (yellow card) 20'; Collins (yellow card) 30'; Bird (yellow card) 31'; Barkhuizen 83'	Report	Leahy (yellow card) 30', (goal) 90+8' (pen.); Forino-Joseph (yellow card) 51'; Vokes (yellow card) 82'	Stadium: Pride Park Stadium; Attendance: 25,385; Referee: Rebecca Welch

21 December 2023 23	Derby County	3–1	Lincoln City	Derby
19:45 GMT	Hourihane 26', (yellow card) 84'; Wilson 65'; Collins 77', (yellow card) 90+3'	Report	Mandroiu 45+2' (pen.); Jackson (yellow card) 57'; Vale (yellow card) 85'; Erhahon (yellow card) 90'	Stadium: Pride Park Stadium; Attendance: 27,192; Referee: Peter Wright

26 December 2023 24	Wigan Athletic	0–1	Derby County	Wigan
15:00 GMT	Morrison (yellow card) 14'; Adeeko (yellow card) 15'; Clare (yellow card) 36'; Lang (yellow card) 45'	Report	Hourihane (yellow card) 7'; Nelson 19'; Mendez-Laing (yellow card) 35'; Collins (yellow card) 45+2'	Stadium: DW Stadium; Attendance: 13,601; Referee: Thomas Parsons

29 December 2023 25	Oxford United	2–3	Derby County	Oxford
19:45 GMT	Brannagan 2' (pen.), 13'; Beadle (yellow card) 67'	Report	Wildsmith (yellow card) 2'; Bird (yellow card) 24'; Forsyth 45+3'; Barkhuizen (yellow card) 59'; John-Jules (yellow card) 71'; Thompson 81'; Cashin 86'	Stadium: The Kassam Stadium; Attendance: 11,219; Referee: Will Finnie

1 January 2024 26	Derby County	2–3	Peterborough United	Derby
15:00 GMT	Collins 1', 60'; Forsyth (yellow card) 41'	Report	Burrows 9'; Kyprianou (yellow card) 30'; Poku 84'; Jones 90+4'	Stadium: Pride Park Stadium; Attendance: 29,917; Referee: Ross Joyce

6 January 2024 27	Fleetwood Town	1–3	Derby County	Fleetwood
12:30 GMT	Vela (yellow card) 31'; Stockley 76'	Report	Mendez-Laing 27'; Collins 45+1', (yellow card) 73'; Barkhuizen 90'	Stadium: Highbury Stadium; Attendance: 4,045; Referee: Ben Speedie
Note: Originally scheduled for a 15:00 kick-off, this match was rescheduled for TV coverage.

15 January 2024 28	Derby County	3–2	Burton Albion	Derby
20:00 GMT	Barkhuizen 29'; Collins 49'; Hourihane 90+3'	Report	Seddon 54'; Oshilaja (yellow card) 64'; Hugill 65'	Stadium: Pride Park Stadium; Attendance: 25,580; Referee: Ben Toner
Note: Originally scheduled for 13 January 2024, this match was rescheduled for TV coverage.

20 January 2024 29	Lincoln City	0–0	Derby County	Lincoln
15:00 GMT	Taylor (yellow card) 68'; Draper (yellow card) 68'	Report	Elder (yellow card) 18'; Wilson (yellow card) 45+2'	Stadium: LNER Stadium; Attendance: 9,735; Referee: Ollie Yates

23 January 2024 18	Reading	1–0	Derby County	Reading
20:00 GMT	Mukairu 54'; Mbengue (yellow card) 73'	Report		Stadium: Select Car Leasing Stadium; Attendance: 9,914; Referee: Darren Drysdale
Note: Originally scheduled for 18 November 2023, this match was postponed due to international call-ups.

27 January 2024 30	Derby County	2–1	Cheltenham Town	Derby
15:00 GMT	Bird 60'; Collins 81'; Wilson (yellow card) 89'	Report	Sercombe 50'; Freestone (yellow card) 55'; Long (yellow card) 70'	Stadium: Pride Park Stadium; Attendance: 27,014; Referee: Leigh Doughty

3 February 2024 31	Charlton Athletic	0–1	Derby County	Charlton
15:00 GMT	Ramsay (yellow card) 70'; Kanu (yellow card) 82'	Report	Mendez-Laing 31'; Adams (yellow card) 41'; Cashin (yellow card) 51'; Sibley (yellow card) 68'; Vickers (yellow card) 90+1'; Hourihane (yellow card) 90+5'	Stadium: The Valley; Attendance: 16,014; Referee: Edward Duckworth

10 February 2024 32	Derby County	1–1	Shrewsbury Town	Derby
15:00 GMT	Bird 54'; Hourihane (yellow card) 67'; Adams (yellow card) 84'	Report	Winchester (yellow card) 36'; Pierre (yellow card) 82', (goal) 87'; Benning (yellow card) 84'	Stadium: Pride Park Stadium; Attendance: 27,240; Referee: James Bell

13 February 2024 33	Exeter City	0–3	Derby County	Exeter
19:45 GMT	Aitchison (yellow card) 49'; Carroll (yellow card) 72'	Report	Bird 24'; Mendez-Laing (yellow card) 26', (goal) 52'; Adams (yellow card) 43'; Barkhuizen 62'; Cashin (yellow card) 68'	Stadium: St James Park; Attendance: 7,754; Referee: Scott Tallis

17 February 2024 34	Derby County	1–0	Stevenage	Derby
15:00 GMT	Sibley 90'	Report	Forster-Caskey (yellow card) 62'; Ashby-Hammond (yellow card) 84'	Stadium: Pride Park Stadium; Attendance: 27,055; Referee: Tom Reeves

24 February 2024 35	Barnsley	2–1	Derby County	Barnsley
15:00 GMT	Phillips 33', 66'; Earl (yellow card) 79'; Cosgrove (yellow card) 86'; Cole (yellow card) 90+1'; Roberts (yellow card) 90+8'	Report	Bradley 18'; Nelson (yellow card) 86'	Stadium: Oakwell; Attendance: 18,332; Referee: Andrew Kitchen

27 February 2024 13	Derby County	1–2	Charlton Athletic	Derby
19:45 GMT	Bradley (yellow card) 22'; Cashin 39'; Wildsmith (yellow card) 64'	Report	May 65' (pen.); Anderson 80'; Gillesphey (yellow card) 82'; Aneke (yellow card) 90+5'	Stadium: Pride Park Stadium; Referee: Jeremy Simpson
Note: Originally scheduled for 14 October 2023, this match was postponed due to international call-ups.

2 March 2024 36	Derby County	3–0	Port Vale	Derby
15:00 GMT	Sibley 5', 58'; Gayle 44'	Report	Ojo (yellow card) 40'; Massey (yellow card) 90+4'	Stadium: Pride Park Stadium; Attendance: 27,392; Referee: Sunny Sukhvir Gill

9 March 2024 37	Bristol Rovers	0–3	Derby County	Horfield
15:00 GMT	Conteh (yellow card) 34'; Martin (yellow card) 45+2'	Report	Adams (yellow card) 38'; Gayle 55', (yellow card) 68'; Barkhuizen 58'; Waghorn 89'	Stadium: Memorial Stadium; Attendance: 9,937; Referee: Lee Swabey

12 March 2024 38	Derby County	2–1	Reading	Derby
19:45 GMT	Cashin (yellow card) 47'; Gayle 53'; Adams (yellow card) 57'; Hourihane 70' (pen.); Sibley (yellow card) 79'	Report	Bindon (yellow card) 10'; Yiadom (yellow card) 32' (yellow-red card) 59'; Mola (yellow card) 49'; Smith 56'; Pereira (yellow card) 69'; Wareham (yellow card) 90+4'	Stadium: Pride Park Stadium; Attendance: 24,821; Referee: Charles Breakspear

16 March 2024 39	Derby County	1–0	Bolton Wanderers	Derby
15:00 GMT	Mendez-Laing (yellow card) 59'; Wilson 78'	Report	Toal (yellow card) 28'	Stadium: Pride Park Stadium; Attendance: 32,538; Referee: Marc Edwards

23 March 2024 40	Northampton Town	1–0	Derby County	Northampton
15:00 GMT	Pinnock (yellow card) 14'; Hoskins 23'; Leonard (yellow card) 65'	Report	Sibley (yellow card) 45'; Cashin (yellow card) 50'; Bradley (red card) 90+10'	Stadium: Sixfields Stadium; Attendance: 7,679; Referee: Scott Oldham

29 March 2024 41	Derby County	1–0	Blackpool	Derby
15:00 GMT	Adams 40'; Sibley (yellow card) 90+5'	Report	Dembélé (yellow card) 33'; Coulson (yellow card) 60'; Norburn (yellow card) 64'	Stadium: Pride Park Stadium; Attendance: 30,089; Referee: Thomas Kirk

2 April 2024 42	Portsmouth	2–2	Derby County	Portsmouth
20:00 BST	Lane (yellow card) 20'; Kamara 27'; Ogilvie (yellow card) 72'; Moxon 77'	Report	Ward 23', 35'; Collins (yellow card) 43'	Stadium: Fratton Park; Attendance: 20,129; Referee: Will Finnie
Note: Originally scheduled for 1 April 2024, this match was rescheduled for live Sky Sports broadcasting.

10 April 2024 43	Wycombe Wanderers	0–0	Derby County	High Wycombe
19:45 BST	Sadlier (yellow card) 67'	Report	Smith (yellow card) 28'	Stadium: Adams Park; Attendance: 5,515; Referee: Matt Donohue
Note: Originally scheduled for 6 April 2024, this match was postponed due to Wycombe's participation in the 2024 EFL Trophy final.

13 April 2024 44	Derby County	3–0	Leyton Orient	Derby
15:00 GMT	Wilson 10'; Bradley 18', 86'	Report		Stadium: Pride Park Stadium; Attendance: 30,247; Referee: Lewis Smith

20 April 2024 45	Cambridge United	0–1	Derby County	Cambridge
15:00 BST	Andrew (yellow card) 41'; Digby (yellow card) 45'	Report	Sibley (yellow card) 24'; Mendez-Laing 39'; Adams (yellow card) 45'	Stadium: Abbey Stadium; Attendance: 7,649; Referee: Paul Howard

27 April 2024 46	Derby County	2–0	Carlisle United	Derby
12:30 BST	Bird 5'; Collins 59'	Report		Stadium: Pride Park Stadium; Attendance: 31,027; Referee: Ben Toner

=== FA Cup ===
Derby were drawn away to Crewe Alexandra in the first round.

Win Draw Loss Fixtures

5 November 2023 First round	Crewe Alexandra	2–2	Derby County	Crewe
14:45 GMT	Baker-Richardson 41'; Nevitt 54'	Report	Mendez-Laing 89'; Hourihane 90+3'	Stadium: Mornflake Stadium; Attendance: 5,201; Referee: Scott Oldham

14 November 2023 First round replay	Derby County	1–3	Crewe Alexandra	Derby
19:45 GMT	Barkhuizen 3'; Wilson (yellow card) 28'; Sibley (yellow card) 37'	Report	Rowe 7', 21'; Demetriou 65'; Tracey (yellow card) 79'; Thomas (yellow card) 90+1'	Stadium: Pride Park Stadium; Attendance: 6,439; Referee: Christopher Pollard

=== EFL Cup ===
Derby were drawn at home to Blackpool in the first round.

Win Draw Loss Fixtures

8 August 2023 First round	Derby County	0–2	Blackpool	Derby
19:45 BST	Forsyth (yellow card) 55'	Report	Beesley 7', 32'; Trybull (yellow card) 84'; O'Donnell (yellow card) 88'	Stadium: Pride Park Stadium; Attendance: 7,033; Referee: Jeremy Simpson

=== EFL Trophy ===
In the group stage, Derby were drawn in Northern Group G alongside Lincoln City, Notts County and Wolverhampton Wanderers U21. They were then drawn at home to Fleetwood Town in the second round and Bradford City in the third round.

Pos	Div	Team	Pld	W	PW	PL	L	GF	GA	GD	Pts	Qualification
1	L1	Derby County	3	3	0	0	0	8	2	+6	9	Advance to Round 2
2	L1	Lincoln City	3	2	0	0	1	4	2	+2	6	Advance to Round 2
3	ACA	Wolverhampton Wanderers U21	3	1	0	0	2	3	7	−4	3	
4	L2	Notts County	3	0	0	0	3	2	6	−4	0	

Updated to match(es) played on 8 November 2023. Source: EFL.com

Win Draw Loss Fixtures

19 September 2023 Group stage	Derby County	2–0	Lincoln City	Derby
19:00 BST	Fornah (yellow card) 4'; Elder (yellow card) 36'; Barkhuizen 51'; Sibley 77'	Report	Duffy (yellow card) 53'	Stadium: Pride Park Stadium; Attendance: 2,726; Referee: Seb Stockbridge

10 October 2023 Group stage	Notts County	1–2	Derby County	Nottingham
19:00 BST	Morias 78' (pen.); Gill (yellow card) 90+3'	Report	Sibley 20', 57', (yellow card) 83'; Forsyth (yellow card) 45+2'; Cashin (yellow card) 66'; Collins (yellow card) 78'	Stadium: Meadow Lane; Attendance: 5,946; Referee: Christopher Pollard

8 November 2023 Group stage	Derby County	4–1	Wolverhampton Wanderers U21	Derby
19:00 GMT	Fapetu (yellow card) 34'; Sibley (yellow card) 36'; Collins 43', 55', 62'; Weston 79'	Report	Kandola (yellow card) 20'; González (yellow card) 24'; Esen 49' (yellow card) 71'	Stadium: Pride Park Stadium; Attendance: 1,952; Referee: Scott Simpson

5 December 2023 Second round	Derby County	3–0	Fleetwood Town	Derby
19:00 GMT	Collins 25', 77'; Waghorn (yellow card) 43'; Hourihane (yellow card) 79'; John-Jules 88'	Report	Heneghan (yellow card) 18'; Earl (yellow card) 26'; Sarpong-Wiredu (yellow card) 35'	Stadium: Pride Park Stadium; Attendance: 1,981; Referee: Scott Jackson

9 January 2024 Third round	Derby County	0–1	Bradford City	Derby
19:00 GMT	Nelson (yellow card) 55'	Report	Ridehalgh (yellow card) 40'; Smallwood (yellow card) 58'; Stubbs 67'; Gilliead (yellow card) 76'	Stadium: Pride Park Stadium; Attendance: 3,831; Referee: Carl Brook

== Statistics ==
=== Goals record ===
As of 27 April 2024

Rank	No.	Nat.	Po.	Name	League One	FA Cup	EFL Cup	EFL Trophy	Total
1	9	(Republic of Ireland)	FW	James Collins	14	0	0	5	19
2	11	(Guatemala)	FW	Nathaniel Mendez-Laing	9	1	0	0	10
3	7	(England)	FW	Tom Barkhuizen	6	1	0	1	8
4	17	(England)	MF	Louie Sibley	4	0	0	3	7
4	10	(England)	FW	Martyn Waghorn	7	0	0	0	7
6	8	(England)	MF	Max Bird	6	0	0	0	6
6	4	(Republic of Ireland)	MF	Conor Hourihane	5	1	0	0	6
8	5	(England)	DF	Sonny Bradley	3	0	0	0	3
8	6	(Republic of Ireland)	DF	Eiran Cashin	3	0	0	0	3
8	3	(Scotland)	DF	Craig Forsyth	3	0	0	0	3
8	25	(England)	FW	Dwight Gayle	3	0	0	0	3
8	14	(Northern Ireland)	FW	Conor Washington	3	0	0	0	3
8	2	(England)	DF	Kane Wilson	3	0	0	0	3
14	19	(England)	FW	Tyreece John-Jules	1	0	0	1	2
14	35	(England)	DF	Curtis Nelson	2	0	0	0	2
14	23	(England)	DF	Joe Ward	2	0	0	0	2
17	32	(The Gambia)	MF	Ebou Adams	1	0	0	0	1
17	12	(England)	MF	Korey Smith	1	0	0	0	1
17	16	(England)	MF	Liam Thompson	1	0	0	0	1
17	43	(England)	FW	Tony Weston	0	0	0	1	1
Own Goals					1	0	0	0	1
Total					78	3	0	11	92
