= Max Bird =

English footballer (born 2000)

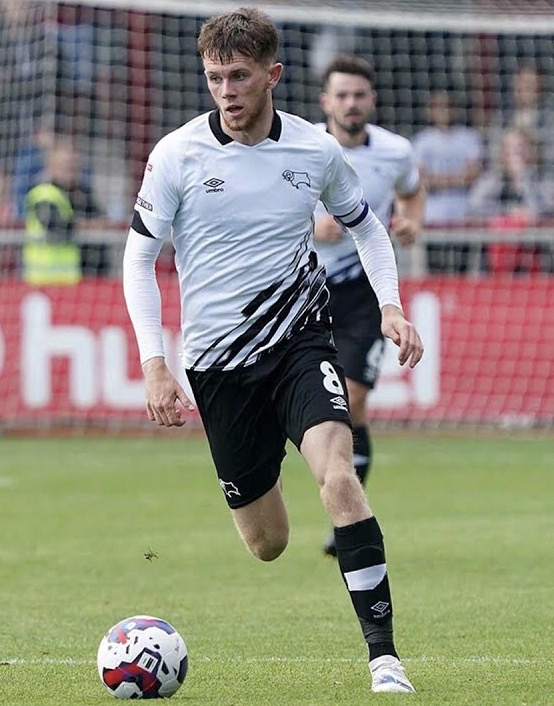
- Bird in 2022

Personal information
- Full name: Max Andrew Bird
- Date of birth: 18 September 2000 (age 26)
- Place of birth: Burton upon Trent, England
- Height: 6 ft 0 in (1.83 m)
- Position: Defensive midfielder

Team information
- Current team: Birmingham City
- Number: 18

Youth career
- 2008-2010: Birmingham City
- 2010–2017: Derby County

Senior career*
Years	Team	Apps	(Gls)
2017–2024	Derby County	163	(6)
2024–2026	Bristol City	61	(3)
2024	→ Derby County (loan)	9	(3)
2026–	Birmingham City	1	(1)
- * Club domestic league appearances and goals as of 10:37, 14 August 2026 (UTC)

Max Andrew Bird (born 18 September 2000) is an English professional footballer who plays as a defensive midfielder for EFL Championship club Birmingham City.

Bird joined Birmingham City’s academy in 2008 before joining Derby County's academy two years later aged 10 in 2010. He made his first-team debut for Derby in September 2017, aged 16. He would make his league debut in December 2018, aged 18. Under Philip Cocu, Bird started to become a mainstay in the Derby first team in late December 2019 and in September 2020, he signed a four-year contract with Derby. Bird scored his first league goal in September 2021 and when Derby entered administration Bird's influence increased as they were relegated to League One from the Championship.

During Derby's spell in League One, Bird became vice-captain for Derby and wore the captain's armband whenever Curtis Davies was unable to play in the 2022–23 season, also he was linked with several moves away from Derby and in January 2024, Bristol City signed Bird on a three-and-a-half-year contract for an undisclosed transfer fee, Bird was loaned back for the remainder of the season as he helped the club regain promotion back to the Championship with six goals in the 2023–24 season, including the first goal in Derby's promotion decider against Carlisle United in his 200th and final appearance for the club, he scored ten times for Derby.

== Career ==
=== Derby County ===
Having progressed through the Derby County Academy, Bird made his debut for the first team against Barnsley in the EFL Cup on 12 September 2017. Aged 16 at the time, he became Derby's eighth-youngest player. Shortly afterwards, he signed a new contract running until 2020.

Bird's first league appearance for Derby County came in the closing seconds of a 2–1 win over Swansea City on 1 December 2018, replacing Mason Mount. He made his first start on 2 March 2019 in a 4–0 away defeat to Aston Villa, playing the full 90 minutes of the game. He was named 2019 EFL Apprentice of the Year and played a part in the U18 Premier League title success.

In the second half of the 2019–20 season Bird broke in to the Derby County first team and became a regular feature in the squad at the age of 19. On 17 September 2020, Bird signed a new deal with Derby to take him through to the end of the 2023–24 season. During the 2020–21 season, Bird would make 34 first team appearances.

In the 2021–22 season, Bird scored his first goal for Derby in a 2–1 win against Stoke City on 18 September 2021, he would score another goal he made 42 appearances as financial issues off the pitch caused the club to be relegated to EFL League One.

Ahead of the 2022–23 season, Bird was named vice-captain of the club by interim manager Liam Rosenior. With club captain Curtis Davies injured, Bird handed the captain's armband in several games. Bird made 48 appearances during the season scoring two goals, as Derby fell short of the League One promotional play-offs by 1 points. His only League One goal against Cheltenham Town on 14 January 2023 was named the club's goal of the season. Bird also reached a milestone 150th first team appearance for the club during the season.

During the summer pre-season and first month of the 2023–24 season, Bird was linked with a return to the Championship with Hull City, managed by former Derby coach Liam Rosenior interested in signing 22-year old Bird, but no offers met Derby's valuation. Bird started the first four games of the season, but this run came to an end after Bird was ruled out for two months after picking up an ankle ligament injury during a match against Oxford United on 15 August 2023. Upon his return, Bird regained his place in the centre of midfield for Derby and scored the first brace of his career in a 4–0 win over Northampton Town on 31 October 2023. On 23 November 2023, amid speculation that a bigger club might put in an offer for the player, manager Paul Warne said Bird would be offered a new contract. In January 2024 Warne stated that Bird would not be allowed to leave Derby in the January transfer window, despite there only being six months left on his contract.

=== Bristol City ===
On 1 February 2024, having rejected the latest contract offer and a fee having been agreed in order to avoid a tribunal case, Bird signed a three-and-a-half-year contract with Bristol City, returning to Derby County on loan until the end of the season.

==== Derby County (loan) ====
After scoring three goals for Derby in a four game period either side of transfer and loan back, Bird stated his desire to help Derby ensure a top-two automatic promotion finish, which he stated would be a perfect end to his association with Derby. A calf injury sustained in early March would rule Bird out of action for a month. On 27 April 2024, Bird would score the opening goal in Derby's 2–0 win against Carlisle United, a result which ensured Derby finish runners-up in League One and earn promotion to the Championship automatically in Bird's 200th and final game for Derby. Bird scored 10 goals in his 200 appearances for Derby and had a very emotional send-off as he was substituted late in the game to a standing ovation by the nearly 30,000 home fans, in his final moment for the club he had been at since being a ten-year old.

=== Birmingham City ===
On 14 August 2026, Bird signed a three year contract with rival EFL Championship club Birmingham City, for an undisclosed fee.

== Personal life ==
On 24 February 2019, Bird's 45-year father, Andrew died from a combination of pneumonia and sepsis, Bird played in an under-23 Derby cup fixture 8 hours after his father's death who had just seen his 18-year-old son make his league debut two months earlier.

== Career statistics ==
As of end of 2025–26 season

Appearances and goals by club, season and competition
Club	Season	League			FA Cup		League Cup		Other		Total	
Club	Season	Division	Apps	Goals	Apps	Goals	Apps	Goals	Apps	Goals	Apps	Goals
Derby County	2017–18	Championship	0	0	0	0	1	0	—		1	0
Derby County	2018–19	Championship	4	0	2	0	2	0	—		8	0
Derby County	2019–20	Championship	22	0	3	0	2	0	—		27	0
Derby County	2020–21	Championship	33	0	0	0	1	0	—		34	0
Derby County	2021–22	Championship	42	2	1	0	0	0	—		43	2
Derby County	2022–23	League One	38	1	5	0	2	0	3 (Note: Appearance(s) in EFL Trophy)	1	48	2
Derby County	2023–24	League One	24	3	2	0	1	0	3	0	30	3
Derby County	Total		163	6	13	0	9	0	6	1	191	7
Bristol City	2023–24	Championship	0	0	—		—		—		0	0
Bristol City	2024–25	Championship	46	1	1	0	0	0	2 (Note: Appearances in EFL Championship play-offs)	0	49	1
Bristol City	2025–26	Championship	15	2	1	0	2	0	—		18	2
Bristol City	Total		61	3	2	0	2	0	2	0	67	3
Derby County (loan)	2023–24	League One	9	3	—		—		—		9	3
Career total			233	12	15	0	11	0	8	1	267	13

== Honours ==
Derby County

- U18 Premier League Champions: 2018–19
- EFL League One second-place promotion: 2023–24
