= George Nunn =

English footballer (born 2001)

Personal information
- Full name: George Johannes Nunn
- Date of birth: 23 November 2001 (age 24)
- Place of birth: Crewe, England
- Height: 1.90 m (6 ft 3 in)
- Position: Forward

Youth career
- Crewe Alexandra
- 2018–2022: Chelsea
- 2022: Derby County

Senior career*
Years	Team	Apps	(Gls)
2022–2024	Derby County	0	(0)
2022	→ Mickleover (loan)	3	(1)
2023	→ Mickleover (loan)	7	(2)
2023	→ Cheshunt (loan)	2	(0)
2023	→ Mickleover (loan)	7	(0)
2023	→ Braintree Town (loan)	1	(0)
2023–2024	→ Hampton & Richmond Borough (loan)	2	(0)
2024	→ Barwell (loan)	5	(1)
2024	HK Kópavogs	25	(1)
2025	Cobh Ramblers	5	(0)
2025	Cheshunt	14	(3)
2025–2026	Ramsgate	4	(0)

International career^{‡}
2019	Republic of Ireland U19	2	(0)
- * Club domestic league appearances and goals as of 27 July 2026 ‡ National team caps and goals as of 27 January 2023

George Johannes Nunn (born 23 November 2001) is a British professional footballer who plays as a forward.

His former clubs are Derby County, Mickleover, Cheshunt, Braintree Town, Hampton & Richmond Borough, Barwell, HK Kópavogs and Cobh Ramblers.

== Club career ==
Born in Crewe, Nunn started his career with local side Crewe Alexandra. He attracted attention from Premier League side Tottenham Hotspur in 2017, having scored a hat-trick against them at under-18 level. However, just a year later, Nunn rejected scholarship terms at Crewe Alexandra to join Premier League side Chelsea, who reportedly paid £300,000 in compensation. The move left Crewe Alexandra coaches somewhat taken aback, with then-manager David Artell stating that he was "fairly confident" that Nunn "would have played in our first team but there's no guarantee", while head of coaching, James Collins, saying "In my opinion he could have been around our first team in 12 month's time".

Nunn signed his first professional contract with Chelsea, a two-year deal, in February 2020. In January 2022, he was linked with a loan move away from the Blues, with clubs in Germany and the Netherlands reportedly interested. He was again linked with a move in July 2022, with Southampton and Derby County being the clubs linked.

Following a trial spell with Derby County, he signed for the Rams in July 2022. In October 2022, he moved to Southern Football League side Mickleover on a month-long loan deal. His loan spell got off to a good start, scoring on his debut against Barwell. He was loaned to Mickleover on another month-long loan in January 2023. He was the loaned out to National League South side Cheshunt for the remainder of the 2022–23 season on 17 March 2023.

At the start of the following season, Nunn joined Mickleover on a third month-long loan spell on 3 August 2023. The loan was extended by a month.

On 21 September 2023, Nunn agreed to join National League South side, Braintree Town on an initial one-month loan. He only made one appearance for the club.

On 3 November 2023, Nunn joined another National League South side, Hampton & Richmond Borough, on a two-month loan to last until 1 January 2024.

Following the conclusion of his loan at Hampton & Richmond, Nunn joined Barwell on loan in January 2024.

Nunn's contract was mutually terminated by Derby on 6 April 2024, in order for the player to sign a permanent deal abroad.

Following his departure from Derby County, Nunn joined Icelandic club HK Kópavogs.

On 7 March 2025, he signed for League of Ireland First Division club Cobh Ramblers. On 27 May 2025, it was announced that he had departed the club by mutual consent in order to facilitate a move back home, following 6 appearances in all competitions without a goal for the club.

In July 2025, Nunn joined Isthmian League Premier Division side Cheshunt. In December 2025, he joined divisional rivals Ramsgate.

== International career ==
Nunn is eligible to represent England, Germany and the Republic of Ireland at international level. He has played for the Republic of Ireland under-19s.

== Personal life ==
Nunn wears shin pads with a photo of football manager Sean Dyche on them. Nunn himself explained that before games he would receive messages of support, along with pictures of Dyche, from his father, who shares a resemblance with the manager.

== Career statistics ==
As of end of 2025–26 season

Appearances and goals by club, season and competition
Club	Season	League			National Cup (Note: Includes FA Cup & Icelandic Football Cup)		League Cup (Note: Includes EFL Cup)		Other		Total	
Club	Season	Division	Apps	Goals	Apps	Goals	Apps	Goals	Apps	Goals	Apps	Goals
Chelsea U23	2019–20	—			—		—		2 (Note: Appearances in EFL Trophy)	0	2	0
Chelsea U23	2020–21	—			—		—		3	0	3	0
Chelsea U23	2021–22	—			—		—		5	0	5	0
Chelsea U23	Total		—		—		—		10	0	10	0
Derby County	2022–23	League One	0	0	0	0	0	0	0	0	0	0
Derby County	2023–24	League One	0	0	—		0	0	0	0	0	0
Derby County	Total		0	0	0	0	0	0	0	0	0	0
Mickleover (loan)	2022–23	Southern League Premier Division Central	10	3	—		—		0	0	10	3
Cheshunt (loan)	2022–23	National League South	2	0	—		—		—		2	0
Mickleover (loan)	2023–24	Southern League Premier Division Central	7	0	2	0	—		0	0	9	0
Braintree Town (loan)	2023–24	National League South	1	0	—		—		0	0	1	0
Hampton & Richmond Borough (loan)	2023–24	National League South	2	0	—		—		2 (Note: Appearances in FA Trophy)	0	4	0
Barwell (loan)	2023–24	Southern League Premier Division Central	5	1	—		—		—		5	1
HK Kópavogs	2024	Besta deild	25	1	2	2	—		—		27	3
Cobh Ramblers	2025	League of Ireland First Division	5	0	—		—		1 (Note: Appearance in the Munster Senior Cup)	0	6	0
Cheshunt	2025–26	Isthmian League Premier Division	14	3	1	0	—		7 (Note: Four appearances and one goal in FA Trophy, one appearance and one goal in Alan Turvey Trophy, two appearances in London Senior Cup)	2	22	5
Ramsgate	2025–26	Isthmian League Premier Division	4	0	—		—		0	0	4	0
Career total			75	8	5	2	0	0	20	2	100	12
