= Adebayo Fapetu =

English footballer (born 2005)

Personal information
- Full name: Adebayo Joseph Ifeoluwa Fapetu
- Date of birth: 18 January 2005 (age 21)
- Position: Midfielder

Team information
- Current team: Cliftonville
- Number: 42

Youth career
- –2021: Arsenal
- 2021–2023: Derby County

Senior career*
Years	Team	Apps	(Gls)
2023–2024	Derby County	1	(0)
2025–	Cliftonville	17	(1)
- * Club domestic league appearances and goals as of 29 April 2026

Adebayo Joseph Ifeoluwa Fapetu (born 18 January 2005) is an English professional footballer who plays as a midfielder for Cliftonville.

He has previously played for Arsenal and Derby County.currently plays for Cliftonville

== Career ==
Fapetu started his career in Arsenal's academy before he joined Derby County's academy on a two-year scholarship in the summer of 2021. In the 2021–22 season, Fapetu became a regular in Derby's under 18 side, making 19 Premier League U18 appearances, scoring one goal as well as making a single appearance for the under-23s. The 2022–23 season would be a breakout season for Fapetu with 5 goals in 22 appearances for the under-18s as well as three appearances for the under-21s.

Ahead of the 2023–24 season, Fapetu graduated the under-21 squad on a full time basis and signed professional terms with Derby. Fapetu became a regular in the under-21s and made his first team debut starting in a 4–1 win over Wolverhampton Wanderers U-21s in the EFL Trophy on 8 November 2023, playing 79 minutes. Fapetu impressed Derby head coach Paul Warne, with his pressing play, interceptions and 40 yard lob which nearly caught out Wolves keeper Daniel Bentley being highlights. Fapetu also featured in Derby's FA Cup first round replay loss to Crewe Alexandra on 14 November 2023 as a 83rd-minute substitute for Derby captain Conor Hourihane. Fapetu would feature in three first team appearances for Derby during the season, two in the EFL Trophy as well as one in the FA Cup and he would also feature as an unused substitute in three League One matches. For the under-21s he would play in 15 Premier League 2 matches, scoring one goal.

On 18 May 2024, Derby County confirmed that Fapetu was in talks to extend his contract at Derby with his deal expiring in June 2024. Fapetu rejected this contract offer subsequently left Derby County.

== Career statistics ==
As of match played 5 December 2023

Appearances and goals by club, season and competition
Club	Season	League			FA Cup		EFL Cup		Other		Total	
Club	Season	Division	Apps	Goals	Apps	Goals	Apps	Goals	Apps	Goals	Apps	Goals
Derby County	2023–24	League One	0	0	1	0	0	0	2 (Note: Appearances in EFL Trophy)	0	3	0
Career total			0	0	1	0	0	0	2	0	3	0
