= Krystian Bielik =

Polish footballer (born 1998)

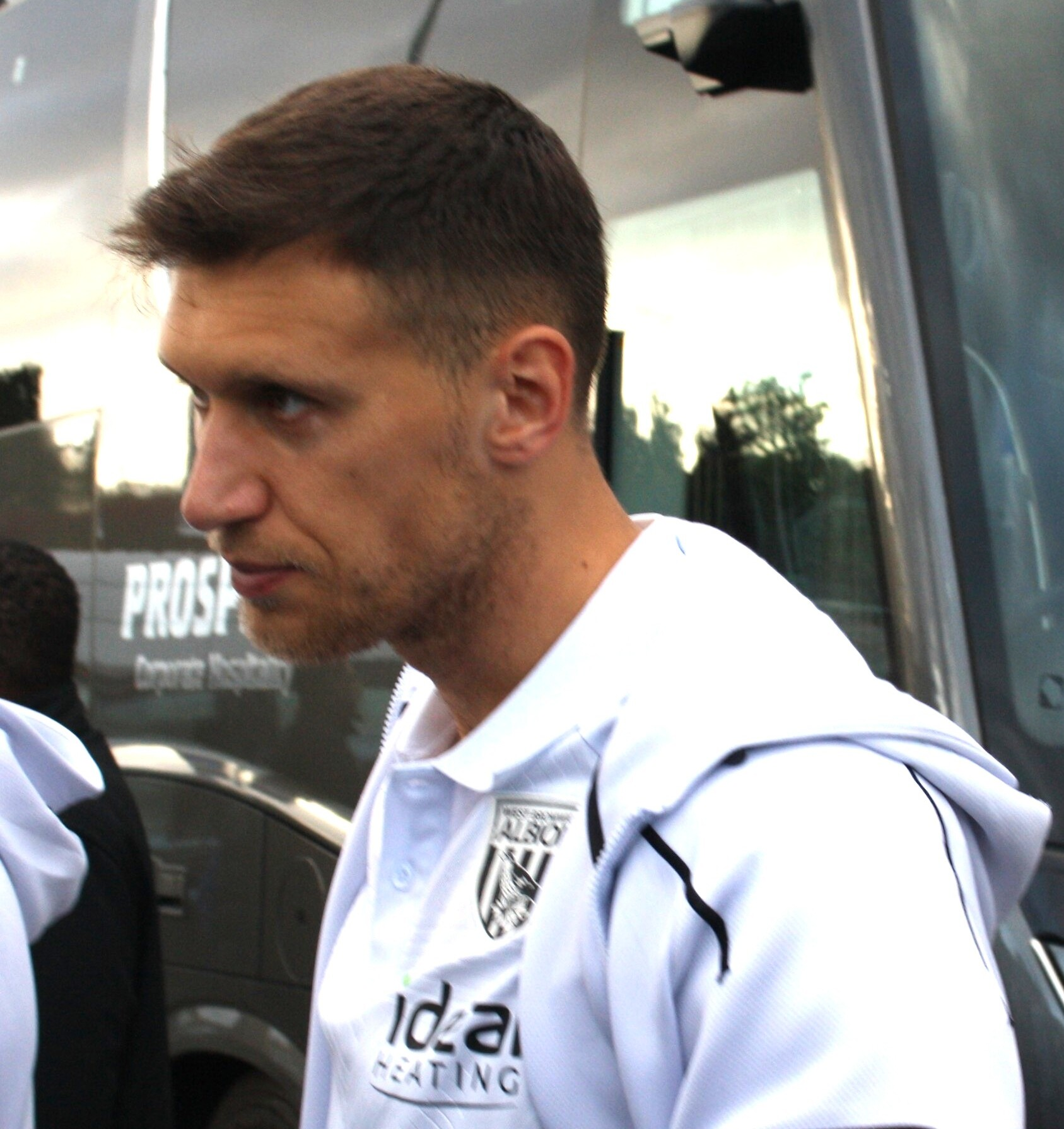
- Bielik with West Bromwich Albion in 2025

Personal information
- Full name: Krystian Bielik
- Date of birth: 4 January 1998 (age 28)
- Place of birth: Konin, Poland
- Height: 1.89 m (6 ft 2 in)
- Positions: Centre back; defensive midfielder

Team information
- Current team: Cardiff City
- Number: 5

Youth career
- Górnik Konin
- 2012–2014: Lech Poznań

Senior career*
Years	Team	Apps	(Gls)
2014–2015	Legia Warsaw II	6	(2)
2014–2015	Legia Warsaw	5	(0)
2015–2019	Arsenal	0	(0)
2017	→ Birmingham City (loan)	10	(0)
2018	→ Walsall (loan)	0	(0)
2018–2019	→ Charlton Athletic (loan)	31	(3)
2019–2023	Derby County	48	(3)
2022–2023	→ Birmingham City (loan)	35	(1)
2023–2025	Birmingham City	68	(1)
2025–2026	West Bromwich Albion	18	(0)
2026–	Cardiff City	8	(0)

International career^{‡}
2013–2014	Poland U16	3	(0)
2014–2015	Poland U17	8	(3)
2015	Poland U18	3	(0)
2017	Poland U19	2	(0)
2017–2019	Poland U21	6	(3)
2019–2023	Poland	11	(0)
- * Club domestic league appearances and goals as of 8 November 2026 (UTC) ‡ National team caps and goals as of 17:10, 18 September 2026 (UTC)

Krystian Bielik (pronounced [ˈkrɨstjan ˈbjɛlik]; born 4 January 1998) is a Polish professional footballer who plays as a centre back or defensive midfielder for EFL Championship club Cardiff City.

Bielik first played senior football with Legia Warsaw in 2014. He then joined Arsenal in 2015, spent the second half of the 2016–17 season on loan at EFL Championship club Birmingham City, and then the 2018–19 season on loan at Charlton Athletic, helping them gain promotion from League One. He joined Derby County in August 2019, rejoined Birmingham on loan for the 2022–23 season, and signed for them on a permanent contract in June 2023. In 2025, he moved to West Bromwich Albion. In August 2026, he joined Cardiff City.

== Club career ==
=== Early career ===
Bielik started playing football for his hometown club, Górnik Konin before being spotted by Lech Poznań scouts in 2012, and later joining their developmental academy. He won the Polish U-17 Championships with the club in early 2014. However, in July 2014, Bielik joined Lech's archrivals, Legia Warsaw for 50,000 zł (£9,000), and on 24 August, he made his Ekstraklasa debut against Korona Kielce.

=== Arsenal ===
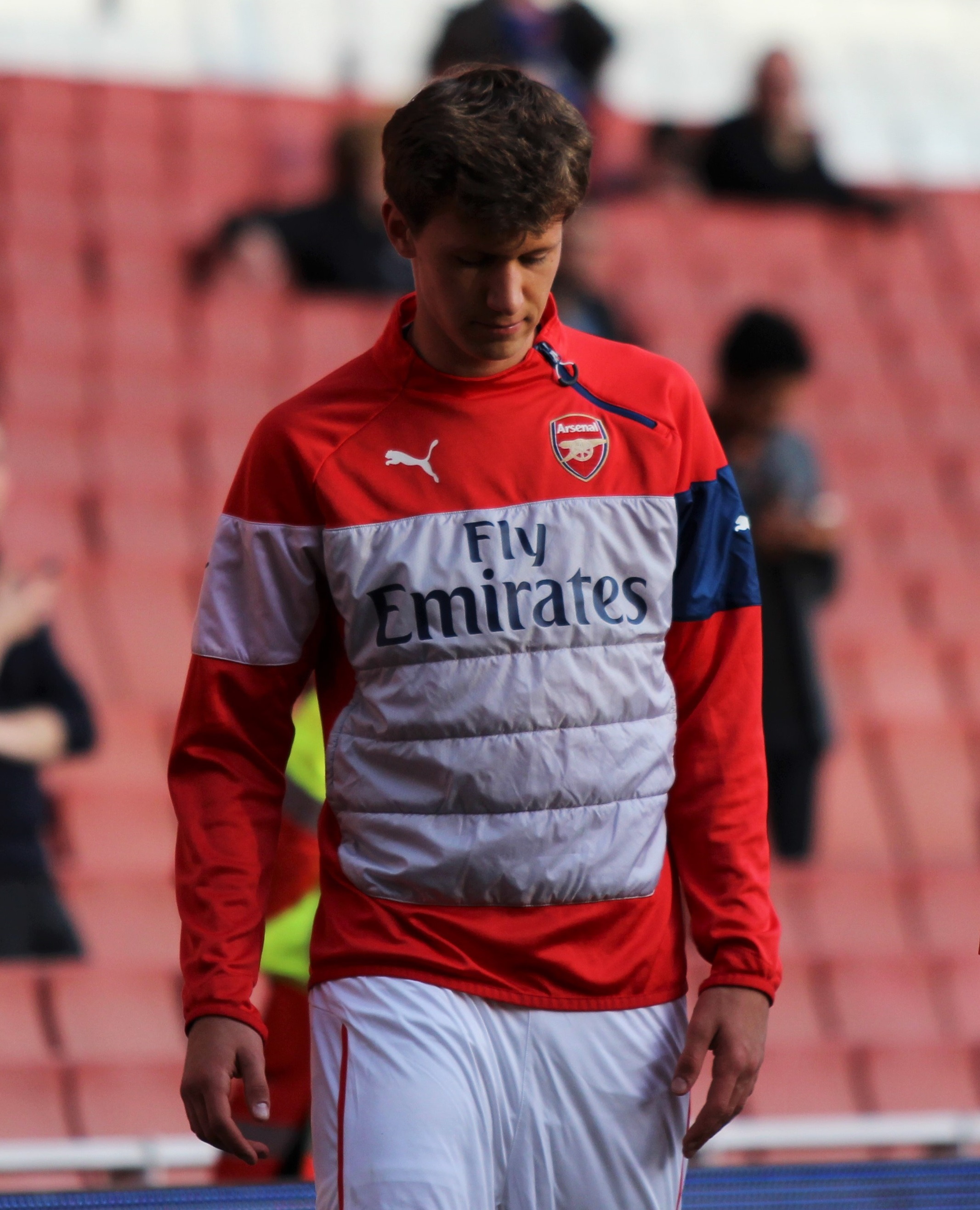
Bielik with Arsenal in 2015

Arsenal completed a reported £2.4 million deal for the 17-year-old Bielik on 21 January 2015; the fee was officially undisclosed.

Bielik made his senior Arsenal debut in the League Cup fourth round on 27 October 2015, replacing fellow debutant Glen Kamara after 60 minutes of a 3–0 loss at Sheffield Wednesday. He was a member of the Arsenal under-21 team that reached the 2015–16 U21 Premier League Division 2 play-off final, held at the Emirates Stadium in May 2016, in which they beat Aston Villa U21 3–1.

==== Birmingham City (loan) ====
On 31 January 2017, Bielik joined EFL Championship club Birmingham City on loan until the end of the 2016–17 season. He made his debut in the starting eleven for the visit to Preston North End on 14 February, and played the whole match as Birmingham lost 2–1. His next appearance was ten days later, as a substitute after centre-back Paul Robinson was sent off with Birmingham 2–0 up away to Wolverhampton Wanderers. Bielik partnered Ryan Shotton in central defence as Birmingham conceded once but, thanks in part to his "two last-ditch challenges in the closing stages", managed to hold on for the win. Playing on the right of a back three alongside Shotton and Robinson in mid-March against Newcastle United, Bielik contributed to a clean sheet, a performance that confirmed his place in the starting eleven for the next few weeks and encouraged manager Gianfranco Zola to consider trying to loan him again in 2017–18.

Zola's dismissal coincided with the return to fitness of Michael Morrison and Birmingham's need for points, and incoming manager Harry Redknapp reverted to a back four and prioritised playing to the team's strengths for the last three matches of the season. He used Bielik only in the final match, away to Bristol City, as a substitute playing in front of the defence to help the team hold on to their one-goal lead and thus avoid relegation to League One.

==== Walsall (loan) ====
A shoulder injury that required surgery prevented Bielik going out on loan in the summer 2017 transfer window, but on 31 January 2018, he signed for Walsall of League One on loan until the end of the season.

==== Charlton Athletic (loan) ====
On 16 August 2018, Bielik joined Charlton Athletic on a season-long loan. His first senior goal gave Charlton a 2–1 win against Southend United on 1 September. He scored in the League One play-off semifinals against Doncaster Rovers, and was awarded Man of the Match in the final against Sunderland, a 2–1 victory at Wembley Stadium by which Charlton Athletic secured promotion to the Championship.

He played 34 games in all competitions and scored four goals during his spell at Charlton, used in both centre back and defensive midfielder positions.

=== Derby County ===
On 2 August 2019, Bielik joined Derby County on a five-year contract. The fee was undisclosed, but reported by the Telegraph as an initial fee of below Derby's record fee paid of £8 million, plus performance-related clauses that could take it "towards the £10 million mark".

In January 2020, Bielik was stretchered off in an under-23 match with what proved to be an anterior cruciate ligament injury. This kept him out of action for the remainder of the 2019–20 season. Bielik made his return to action in November 2020, returning in a 2–0 home defeat to Barnsley that saw Derby fall to bottom of the Championship. He scored his first goal for Derby in a 4–0 win over Birmingham City on 29 December.

On 30 January 2021, Bielik suffered another ACL injury that kept him out for the rest of the year. Bielik made his long-awaited return a year to the day since he suffered it, coming off of the bench and scoring a 96th-minute equaliser with an overhead kick as Derby got a much-needed 2–2 draw with Birmingham City. He made 15 appearances by the end of the season as Derby were relegated to League One, and regained his international place, but was told by Poland's manager Czesław Michniewicz that he would not be considered for the 2022 World Cup if he were a third-tier player.

=== Return to Birmingham City ===
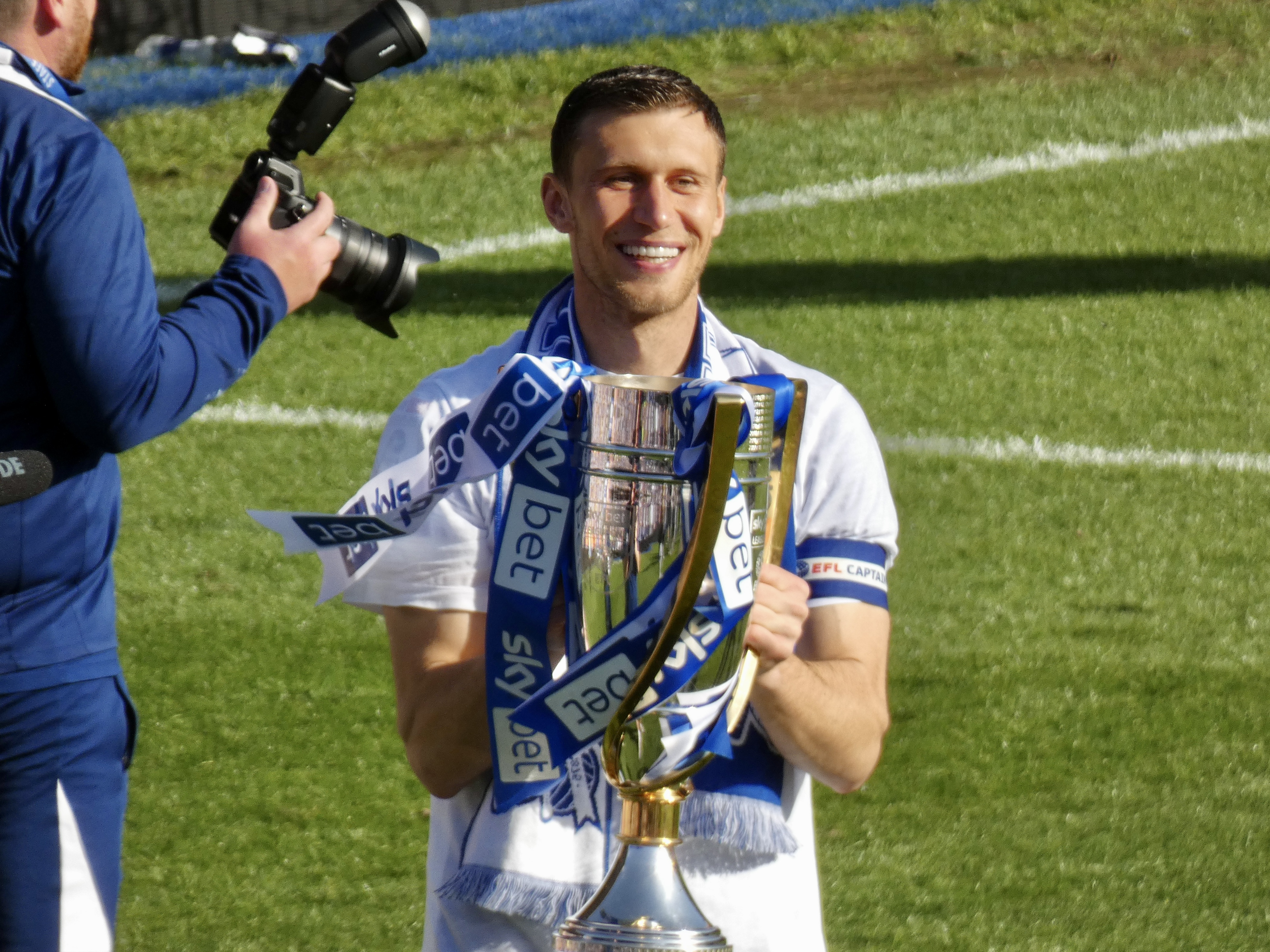
Bielik with the League One trophy following a 4–0 win over Mansfield Town in 2025

Bielik rejoined Championship club Birmingham City on 29 July 2022 on loan for the 2022–23 season. Bielik played 37 times during his loan spell, the best seasonal appearance record of his career, with one goal being scored in a 2–0 win over West Bromwich Albion in February 2023.

He signed a three-year contract with Birmingham City effective from 1 July 2023; the fee was undisclosed. Bielik played 39 games in the 2023–24 season as Birmingham were relegated to League One.

=== West Bromwich Albion ===
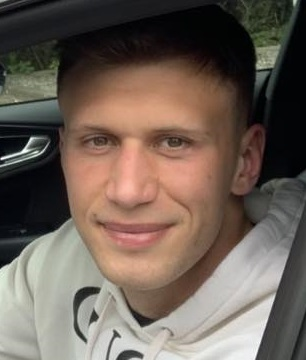
Bielik in 2024

On 14 August 2025, Bielik signed a three-year contract with EFL Championship side West Bromwich Albion for an undisclosed fee.

=== Cardiff City ===
On 26 August 2026, Bielik moved to fellow EFL Championship club Cardiff City on a three-year contract. In October he was suspended for two matches after an altercation with a fan during a match against Portsmouth.

== International career ==
Bielik was named in Poland's squad for the 2017 UEFA European Under-21 Championship, but did not play. He was called up for the 2019 UEFA European Under-21 Championship, at which he scored twice in three matches.

Bielik received his first call-up to Poland's senior team for UEFA Euro 2020 qualifiers in September 2019. On 6 September 2019, he debuted as a substitute against Slovenia at the 70th minute, ending in a 2–0 loss. Bielik started three days later in a goalless draw against Austria.

After leaving Derby on loan at the start of the 2022–23 season to enhance his chances of playing international football, Bielik was named in Poland's squad for the 2022 World Cup. He played in all four of Poland's matches at the tournament as they reached the round of 16, in which they lost to eventual runners-up France. He played twice more for his country that season, but not at all in 2023–24, and was omitted from Poland's squad for Euro 2024.

== Style of play ==
Bielik can play either as a centre back or as a defensive midfielder. He is known for his technique, passing ability and also his aerial dominance.

== Career statistics ==
=== Club ===
As of match played 19 September 2026

Appearances and goals by club, season and competition
Club	Season	League			National cup (Note: Includes Polish Cup, FA Cup)		League cup (Note: Includes EFL Cup)		Other		Total	
Club	Season	Division	Apps	Goals	Apps	Goals	Apps	Goals	Apps	Goals	Apps	Goals
Legia Warsaw II	2014–15	III liga, group A	6	2	—		—		—		6	2
Legia Warsaw	2014–15	Ekstraklasa	5	0	0	0	—		1 (Note: Appearance in UEFA Europa League)	0	6	0
Arsenal	2014–15	Premier League	0	0	0	0	0	0	0	0	0	0
Arsenal	2015–16	Premier League	0	0	0	0	1	0	0	0	1	0
Arsenal	2016–17	Premier League	0	0	0	0	1	0	0	0	1	0
Arsenal	2017–18	Premier League	0	0	0	0	0	0	0	0	0	0
Arsenal	2018–19	Premier League	0	0	0	0	0	0	0	0	0	0
Arsenal	Total		0	0	0	0	2	0	0	0	2	0
Birmingham City (loan)	2016–17	Championship	10	0	—		—		—		10	0
Walsall (loan)	2017–18	League One	0	0	—		—		—		0	0
Charlton Athletic (loan)	2018–19	League One	31	3	0	0	0	0	3 (Note: Appearances in League One play-offs)	1	34	4
Derby County	2019–20	Championship	20	0	0	0	1	0	—		21	0
Derby County	2020–21	Championship	13	2	0	0	0	0	—		13	2
Derby County	2021–22	Championship	15	1	0	0	0	0	—		15	1
Derby County	Total		48	3	0	0	1	0	0	0	49	3
Birmingham City (loan)	2022–23	Championship	35	1	2	0	0	0	—		37	1
Birmingham City	2023–24	Championship	36	0	3	0	0	0	—		39	0
Birmingham City	2024–25	League One	32	1	2	0	2	0	3 (Note: Appearances in EFL Trophy)	0	39	1
Birmingham City	Total		103	2	7	0	2	0	3	0	115	2
West Bromwich Albion	2025–26	Championship	17	0	2	0	0	0	—		19	0
West Bromwich Albion	2026–27	Championship	1	0	—		0	0	—		1	0
West Bromwich Albion	Total		18	0	2	0	0	0	—		20	0
Cardiff City	2026–27	Championship	6	0	0	0	0	0	—		6	0
Career total			227	10	9	0	5	0	7	1	248	11

=== International ===
Appearances and goals by national team and year
National team	Year	Apps	Goals
Poland
Poland	2019	3	0
Poland	2020	0	0
Poland	2021	0	0
Poland	2022	6	0
Poland	2023	2	0
Total		11	0

== Honours ==
Arsenal U21

- U21 Premier League Division 2 play-offs: 2015–16

Charlton Athletic

- EFL League One play-offs: 2019

Birmingham City

- EFL League One: 2024–25
