= Darren Cowley =

English cricketer

Personal information
- Full name: Darren James Cowley
- Born: 30 October 1976 (age 50); Winchester, Hampshire, England
- Batting: Left-handed
- Bowling: Slow left-arm orthodox
- Relatives: Nigel Cowley (Father)

Domestic team information
- Years: Team
- 2000–2008: Dorset

Career statistics
Competition	LA
Matches	1
Runs scored	11
Batting average	11.00
100s/50s	–/–
Top score	11
Balls bowled	–
Wickets	–
Bowling average	–
5 wickets in innings	–
10 wickets in match	–
Best bowling	–
Catches/stumpings	–/–
- Source: Cricinfo, 21 March 2010

Darren James Cowley (born 30 October 1976) is a former English List A cricketer. Cowley was a left-handed batsman who bowled slow left-arm orthodox.

It can be assumed that Cowley spent a large part of his early years in South Africa, due to his representing of the South Africa U-19, where he played 3 Youth One Day Internationals against India U-19 during their tour of India in April 1996.

Cowley made his debut for Dorset in the 2000 Minor Counties Championship against Herefordshire. From 2000 to 2012, Cowley represented Dorset in 68 Minor Counties Championship matches, with his final appearance for the county coming against Berkshire where he scored 125 in his final innings.

In 2004, Cowley played his only List-A match for Dorset in the 2004 Cheltenham & Gloucester Trophy against Yorkshire, where he scored 11 runs.

== Family ==
Colwey's father Nigel played first-class cricket for Hampshire and Glamorgan. His father also represented Dorset in Minor County Championship matches.
