= 2026–27 Blackburn Rovers F.C. season =

English football club season

Blackburn Rovers
2026–27 season
- Owner: Venkys London Ltd.
- CEO: Steve Curwood
- Head coach: Tony Mowbray (until 17 November)
- Stadium: Ewood Park
- Championship: 18th
- EFL Cup: Second round
- Top goalscorer: League: Andri Guðjohnsen (2); All: Andri Guðjohnsen (3)
Home colours	Away colours	Third colours

The 2026–27 season is the 139th season in the history of Blackburn Rovers Football Club and their ninth consecutive season in the Championship. In addition to the domestic league, the club would also participate in the FA Cup, and the EFL Cup.

== Season summary ==
=== May ===
On 19 May 2026, Rovers announced their retained list. The club confirmed they activated the one-year options in the contract of Kristi Montgomery. The club made a contract offer to Nathan Dlamini, while Igor Tyjon, Valentin Joseph and Bruce Leeming all had their scholarship agreements extended into a third year.

The club confirmed that Ryan Hedges, Sondre Tronstad and Nathan Redmond would all leave Ewood Park when their contracts expire at the end of June. Under-21s players Leo Duru, Harley O'Grady-Macken, Adam Khan, Harrison Wood, Joe Boggan, Zack Stritch and Patrik Farkas, along with scholars Aaron Potter, Blake Wolsoncroft, Leon Kelley-Quinn and Luke Thompson, will not be retained by the club upon the expiration of their current contracts.

On 23 May 2026, Rovers announced the appointment of Steve Curwood as the club's Chief Executive Officer.

=== June ===
On 5 June, Rovers announced the return of Tony Mowbray as head coach on a long-term contract.

On 11 June, Rovers announced first team coach Phil Jones had left the club.

On 23 June, Rovers announced the appointment of Paul Butler as under-21 head coach steeping up from his role as under-18 head coach.

On 27 June, Rovers announced the appointment of Mike Dodds as assistant head coach.

=== July ===
On 1 July, Rovers announced new kit manufacturers Umbro in a long-term partnership.

On 18 July, Rovers announced the appointment of Gareth Stewart as first team goalkeeper coach.

On 20 July, Rovers announced that Damien Johnson had been promoted to assistant head coach & head of player development.

On 24 July, it was announced Rovers Head of Medical Andrew Proctor had left to join Norwich City as Head of Physiotherapy.

=== August ===
On 11 August, Rovers announced that Dan Stubberfield had been appointed as the new head coach of the under-18s.

=== September ===
On 2 September, Rovers announced announced the appointment of Wayne Gill as Head of Physiotherapy & Dave Fevre who returns as a Medical Consultant.

=== November ===
On 17 November, Tony Mowbray stepped down from his position as head coach due to "health issues".

== Backroom staff ==
As of 19 May 2025

=== Senior football ===
Position	Staff
Head Coach	(England) Tony Mowbray
Head of Football Operations	(Benin) Rudy Gestede
Head of Technical Development	(Wales) Adam Owen
Assistant Head Coach	(England) Mike Dodds
Assistant Head Coach & Head of Player Development	(Northern Ireland) Damien Johnson
First-Team Coach	Vacant
Goalkeeping Coach	(England) Gareth Stewart
Head of Performance	(Spain) Nacho Sancho
Consultant	(England) Dr. Chris Dalton
Head of Physiotherapy	(England) Wayne Gill
Medical Consultant	(England) Dave Fevre
Loan Manager	(Scotland) Jordan Rhodes
Kit Manager	(England) Carl Brighty

=== Academy football ===
Position	Staff
Head of Academy	(Northern Ireland) Paul Gray
Head of Academy Coaching	(England) John Prince
Under-21s Lead Coach	(England) Paul Butler
Under-21s Assistant Coach	(Republic of Ireland) Darragh Tuffy
Under-18s Lead Coach	(England) Dan Stubberfield
Under-18s Assistant Coach	(England) Ryan Kidd
Academy Goalkeeper Coach	(England) Matthew Urwin
Head of Academy Sports Science and Medical	(England) Rob Pulling
Head of Academy Recruitment	(England) Michael Cribley
Academy Secretary	(England) Dawn Dunn

== Current squad ==
Players and squad numbers last updated on 19 May 2026. List is representative of players who have made an appearance for the first-team this season and of information available on Rovers.co.uk.

Note: Flags indicate national team as has been defined under FIFA eligibility rules. Players may hold more than one non-FIFA nationality.

No.	Pos.	Nat.	Name	Date of birth & age	Year joined	Contract expires	Joined from	Other	Ref
Goalkeepers
34	GK	(England)	Jack Barrett	4 June 2002 (age 24)	2024	2027 (+1)	(England) Everton	Option for 12-month extension.	
37	GK	(England)	Felix Goddard	9 March 2004 (age 22)	2020	2027 (+1)	Academy	Option for 12-month extension	
1	GK	(England)	Aynsley Pears	23 April 1998 (age 28)	2020	2027	(England) Middlesbrough		
38	GK	(England)	Finley Taylor	10 January 2008 (age 18)	2026	2028 (+1)	(England) Brighton & Hove Albion	Option for 12-month extension	
22	GK	(Hungary)	Balázs Tóth	4 September 1997 (age 29)	2024	2027	(Hungary) Fehérvár		
Defenders
6	DF	(Northern Ireland)	Tom Atcheson	22 October 2006 (age 20)	2023	2030	Academy		
2	DF	(Nigeria)	Ryan Alebiosu	17 December 2001 (age 24)	2025	2028 (+1)	(Belgium) Kortrijk	Option for 12-month extension	
17	DF	(England)	Hayden Carter	17 December 1999 (age 26)	2014	2027	Academy		
27	DF	(France)	Gady Beyuku	23 November 2005 (age 20)	2026		(Italy) Modena		
46	DF	(Italy)	Michael Decandia	17 October 2007 (age 19)	2024	2028 (+1)	Academy	Option for 12-month extension	
47	DF	(England)	Lucas Houghton	13 November 2006 (age 20)	2025	2027 (+1)	Academy	Option for 12-month extension	
40	DF	(England)	Matty Litherland	31 October 2005 (age 21)	2011	2027 (+1)	Academy	Option for 12-month extension	
15	DF	(Republic of Ireland)	Sean McLoughlin	13 November 1996 (age 30)	2025		(England) Hull City		
33	DF	(Australia)	Lewis Miller	24 August 2000 (age 26)	2025	2028 (+1)	(Scotland) Hibernian	Option for 12-month extension.	
26	DF	(Republic of Ireland)	Connor O'Riordan	19 October 2003 (age 23)	2024	2028	(England) Crewe Alexandra	On loan at Barnsley	
39	DF	(England)	Harvey Pates	24 April 2008 (age 18)	2026	2028 (+1)	Academy	Option for 12-month extension	
3	DF	(England)	Harry Pickering	29 December 1998 (age 27)	2021	2027 (+1)	(England) Crewe Alexandra	Option for 12-month extension	
43	DF	(England)	George Pratt	17 September 2003 (age 23)	2021	2030	Academy	On loan at Bradford City	
4	DF	(Portugal)	Yuri Ribeiro	24 January 1997 (age 29)	2025	2027 (+1)	(Portugal) Braga	Option for 12-month extension	
16	DF	(England)	Scott Wharton	3 October 1997 (age 29)	2010	2028 (+1)	Academy	Option for 12-month extension	
Midfielders
24	MF	(France)	Moussa Baradji	20 November 2000 (age 26)	2025		(Switzerland) Yverdon Sport		
10	MF	(England)	Todd Cantwell	27 March 1998 (age 28)	2024	2027	(Scotland) Rangers		
14	MF	(Belgium)	Dion De Neve	12 June 2001 (age 25)	2025	2028 (+1)	(Belgium) Kortrijk	Option for 12-month extension.	
48	MF	(England)	Isaac Dunn	31 December 2008 (age 17)	2014	2028 (+1)	Academy	Option for 12-month extension.	
28	MF	(England)	Adam Forshaw	8 October 1991 (age 35)	2025	2027	(England) Plymouth Argyle		
30	MF	(England)	Jake Garrett	10 March 2003 (age 23)	2013	2027	Academy		
18	MF	(Sweden)	Axel Henriksson	16 April 2002 (age 24)	2025	2029 (+1)	(Sweden) GAIS	Option for 12-month extension, On loan at Randers	
42	MF	(England)	Harry Lister	11 November 2008 (age 18)	2025	2027	Academy		
31	MF	(Scotland)	Kristi Montgomery	31 May 2004 (age 22)	2013		Academy		
25	MF	(Japan)	Ryōya Morishita	11 April 1997 (age 29)	2025	2028 (+1)	(Poland) Legia Warsaw	Option for 12-month extension	
8	MF	(Egypt)	Sam Morsy	10 September 1991 (age 35)	2026	2027 (+1)	(England) Bristol City	Option for 12-month extension	
5	MF	(Portugal)	Sidnei Tavares	29 September 2001 (age 25)	2025	2028	(Portugal) Moreirense	On loan at Wisła Płock	
53	MF	(England)	Frank Vare	12 September 2007 (age 19)	2024	2028 (+1)	Academy	Option for 12-month extension	
Forwards
21	FW	(England)	Dapo Afolayan	11 September 1997 (age 29)	2026	2027 (+1)	(Germany) St Pauli	Option for 12-month extension	
11	FW	(England)	Jayden Fevrier	14 April 2003 (age 23)	2026		(England) Stockport County		
9	FW	(Iceland)	Andri Guðjohnsen	29 January 2002 (age 24)	2025		(Belgium) Gent		
45	FW	(England)	Harvey Higgins	12 January 2009 (age 17)	2016	2028 (+1)	Academy	Option for 12-month extension	
29	FW	(Denmark)	Mathias Jørgensen	20 September 2000 (age 26)	2026	2029 (+1)	(Norway) Bodø/Glimt	Option for 12-month extension	
7	FW	(Sierra Leone)	Augustus Kargbo	24 August 1999 (age 27)	2025	2027	(Italy) Cesena		
23	FW	(Japan)	Yūki Ōhashi	27 July 1996 (age 30)	2024	2027 (+1)	(Japan) Sanfrecce Hiroshima	Option for 12-month extension	

== Transfers and contracts ==
=== In ===
Date	Pos.	Player	From	Fee	Ref.
First team
19 May 2026	CM	(France) Moussa Baradji	(Switzerland) Yverdon Sport	£2,000,000	
28 July 2026	RW	(England) Jayden Fevrier	(England) Stockport County	£500,000	
10 August 2026	CM	(Egypt) Sam Morsy	(England) Bristol City	Free	
2 September 2026	RB	(France) Gady Beyuku	(Italy) Modena	Undisclosed	
Academy
18 May 2026	CAM	(Lithuania) Kajus Čepas	(England) Bracknell Town	Undisclosed	
18 May 2026	LW	(England) Chase Whiffing	(England) AFC Portchester	Undisclosed	
1 July 2026	RW	(England) Theo Chimpango	(England) Manchester City	Undisclosed	
23 July 2026	GK	(England) Finley Taylor	(England) Brighton & Hove Albion	Free	
27 July 2026	LB	(England) Tino Goremusandu	(England) Southampton	Free	
30 July 2026	CM	(England) Yerime Ouattara	(England) Brentford	Free	
4 August 2026	CB	(England) Alfie Rice	(England) Notts County	Undisclosed	
17 August 2026	CM	(England) Josh Ubah	(England) Newcastle United	Undisclosed	

=== Out ===
Date	Pos.	Player	To	Fee	Ref.
First team
Academy
1 August 2026	CF	(England) Valentin Joseph	(England) Brighton & Hove Albion	£500,000	
4 August 2026	RB	(England) Finley Wilkinson	(England) Bolton Wanderers	Free	
28 August 2026	CF	(England) Igor Tyjon	(England) Arsenal	£1,000,000 (Note: A potential further £2,000,000 in add-ons.)	

=== Loaned in ===
Date	Pos.	Player	From	Loaned until	Ref.
First team
Academy

=== Loaned out ===
Date	Pos.	Player	To	Loaned until	Ref.
First team
27 August 2026	CB	(Republic of Ireland) Connor O'Riordan	(England) Barnsley	End of Season (Note: Option to make the move permanent.)	
27 August 2026	CB	(England) George Pratt	(England) Bradford City	End of Season	
28 August 2026	CM	(Sweden) Axel Henriksson	(Denmark) Randers	End of Season	
1 September 2026	CDM	(Portugal) Sidnei Tavares	(Poland) Wisła Płock	End of Season	
Academy
17 July 2026	CB	(England) Max Davies	(England) Southport	End of Season	
25 July 2026	LW	(Northern Ireland) Aodhan Doherty	(Scotland) Falkirk	End of Season	
1 August 2026	LW	(Sierra Leone) Osman Kamara	(England) Crawley Town	End of Season	
1 August 2026	GK	(England) Nicholas Michalski	(England) Crawley Town	End of Season	
7 August 2026	GK	(England) Jack Barrett	(England) Marine	25 September 2026 (Note: On 25 September, Barrett was recalled from his initial season-long loan at Marine.)	
25 September 2026	CM	(England) Tyler Mansbridge	(England) Bamber Bridge	25 October 2026	
30 October 2026	RB	(England) Lucas Houghton	(England) FC Halifax Town	30 November 2026	

=== Released / Out of Contract ===
Date	Pos.	Player	Subsequent club	Joined date	Ref.
First team
30 June 2026	DM	(Norway) Sondre Tronstad	(Norway) Brann	12 August 2026	
30 June 2026	RW	(Wales) Ryan Hedges	(England) Derby County	20 August 2026	
30 June 2026	RW	(England) Nathan Redmond			
Academy
30 June 2026	CM	(England) Harley O'Grady-Macken	(England) Radcliffe	5 July 2026	
30 June 2026	CF	(England) Joe Boggan	(Scotland) Livingston	15 July 2026	
30 June 2026	RB	(United States) Leo Duru	(England) Carlisle United	25 July 2026	
30 June 2026	GK	(England) Luke Thompson	(England) Avro	26 July 2026	
30 June 2026	RW	(England) Harrison Wood	(England) Warrington Rylands	1 August 2026	
30 June 2026	CB	(England) Leon Kelley-Quinn	(United States) Siena Saints	8 August 2026	
30 June 2026	CAM	(England) Zack Stritch	(England) AFC Fylde	8 August 2026	
30 June 2026	LW	(England) Nathan Dlamini	(England) West Bromwich Albion	17 August 2026	
30 June 2026	CM	(Hungary) Patrik Farkas	(England) Liverpool	15 September 2026	
30 June 2026	GK	(Pakistan) Adam Khan			
30 June 2026	CM	(England) Aaron Potter			
30 June 2026	GK	(England) Blake Wolsoncroft			

=== New Contract ===
Date	Pos.	Player	Contract expiry	Ref.
First team
19 May 2026	CM	(Scotland) Kristi Montgomery	30 June 2027	
6 July 2026	CM	(Scotland) Kristi Montgomery	Undisclosed	
10 November 2026	CB	(Republic of Ireland) Sean McLoughlin	Undisclosed	
Academy
19 May 2026	CF	(England) Valentin Joseph	30 June 2027	
19 May 2026	LB	(Wales) Bruce Leeming	30 June 2027	
19 May 2026	CF	(England) Igor Tyjon	30 June 2027	
25 July 2026	LW	(Northern Ireland) Aodhan Doherty	30 June 2030	
3 August 2026	LW	(England) Archie McCoy	Undisclosed (Note: First professional contract)	
16 September 2026	RB	(Wales) Theo Pitt	30 June 2029	
28 October 2026	CDM	(England) Levi Ball	30 June 2029	

== Pre-season and friendlies ==
On 20 May, Blackburn Rovers announced pre season friendlies with Accrington Stanley and Huddersfield Town. In June, a pre-season training camp in Algarve between 19 and 25 July was confirmed along with a fixture against Nottingham Forest. On 6 July, a behind closed doors meeting with Strasbourgh was also added to the Portugal training camp.

Win Draw Loss Fixtures

11 July 2026 Friendly	Accrington Stanley	0–0	Blackburn Rovers	Accrington
15:00 BST		Report		Stadium: The Wham Stadium

18 July 2026 Friendly	Blackburn Rovers	3–0	Barnsley	Brockhall, Blackburn
15:00 BST	Litherland 24'; Guðjohnsen 33'; Morishita 66'	Report		Stadium: Blackburn Rovers Senior Training Centre; Attendance: 0 (BCD)

22 July 2026 Friendly	Blackburn Rovers	0–3	Nottingham Forest	Ferreiras, Portugal
12:00 WEST		Report	Jesus 40'; Kalimuendo 48'; Awoniyi 51'	Stadium: Estádio da Nora

25 July 2026 Friendly	Blackburn Rovers	2–0	Strasbourg	TBC, Portugal
18:00 WEST	O.G. 3'; Cantwell 84'	Report		Stadium: TBC; Attendance: 0 (BCD)

29 July 2026 Friendly	Blackpool	1–1	Blackburn Rovers	Blackpool
17:30 BST	Ennis 51'	Report	Morishita 31'	Stadium: Bloomfield Road; Attendance: 0 (BCD)

1 August 2026 Friendly	Huddersfield Town	1−1	Blackburn Rovers	Huddersfield
15:00 CEST	Harness 40'	Report	Garrett 73'	Stadium: Accu Stadium

2 October 2026 Friendly	Everton	3−3	Blackburn Rovers	Vauxhall
14:00 BST		Report	Cantwell; Afolayan; Kargbo	Stadium: Hill Dickinson Stadium; Attendance: 0 (BCD)

== Competitions ==
=== Overall record ===
Competition	Starting round	Final position	Record							
Competition	Starting round	Final position	Pld	W	D	L	GF	GA	GD	Win %
Championship	Matchday 1		16	6	4	6	24	25	−1	37.50
FA Cup	Third round	Third round					—			
EFL Cup	First round	First round	2	1	0	1	3	3	+0	50.00
Total			18	7	4	7	27	28	−1	38.89

Last updated: 22 November 2026
Source: Soccerway

=== EFL Championship ===
==== League table ====
Pos	Team	Pld	W	D	L	GF	GA	GD	Pts
11	Norwich City	16	8	0	8	34	25	+9	24
12	Portsmouth	16	6	5	5	21	19	+2	23
13	Blackburn Rovers	15	6	3	6	22	23	−1	21
14	Wrexham	16	5	6	5	19	20	−1	21
15	Cardiff City	16	4	6	6	28	29	−1	18

Updated to match(es) played on 21 November 2026. Source: EFL Official Website
Rules for classification: 1) Points; 2) Goal difference; 3) Number of goals scored; 4) Head-to-head results; 5) Wins; 6) Away goals; 7) Penalty points (sec 9.5); 8) Number of 12-point sending off offences; 9) Play-off (only if needed to determine promotion/relegation)

==== Results summary ====
Overall								Home						Away					
Pld	W	D	L	GF	GA	GD	Pts	W	D	L	GF	GA	GD	W	D	L	GF	GA	GD
16	6	4	6	24	25	−1	22	5	0	3	14	10	+4	1	4	3	10	15	−5

Last updated: 22 November 2026.
Source: Soccerway

==== Results by round ====
Round	1	2	3	4	5	6	7	8	9	10	11	12	13	14	15	16	17	18	19	20	21	22	23	24	25	26	27	28	29	30	31
Ground	A	H	H	A	A	H	H	A	H	A	A	H	A	H	H	A	A	H	A	H	H	A	H	A	A	H	H	A	A	H	A
Result	D	W	L	D	L	L	W	D	W	W	L	W	L	L	W	D															
Position	9	5	10	10	16	19	15	16	13	9	10	10	13	14	13	13															
Points	1	4	4	5	5	5	8	9	12	15	15	18	18	18	21	22															

Source: EFL
A = Away; H = Home; W = Win; D = Draw; L = Loss; P = Postponed; AB = Abandoned

==== Matches ====
On 25 June, the Championship fixtures were revealed.

Win Draw Loss Fixtures

14 August 2026 1	Wolverhampton Wanderers	2–2	Blackburn Rovers	Wolverhampton
20:00 BST	Munetsi 18'; Mané (yellow card) 52'; Jiménez 90+3' (pen.)	Report	McLoughlin 27'; Pickering (yellow card) 34'; Cantwell (yellow card) 35'; Forshaw (yellow card) 45'; Guðjohnsen 48'	Stadium: Molineux Stadium; Attendance: 30,984 (2,015 away); Referee: Farai Hallam

22 August 2026 2	Blackburn Rovers	2–1	Middlesbrough	Blackburn
15:00 BST	Afolayan (yellow card) 24'; McLoughlin (yellow card) 45+2'; Guðjohnsen 49'; Cantwell 55', (yellow card) 76'; Morsy (yellow card) 58'	Report	Sarmiento 12'; Lankshear (yellow card) 90'	Stadium: Ewood Park; Attendance: 18,918 (6,236 away); Referee: Tom Reeves

29 August 2026 3	Blackburn Rovers	1–2	Queens Park Rangers	Blackburn
15:00 BST	Morishita 49'; Guðjohnsen (yellow card) 65'; McLoughlin (yellow card) 76'; Morsy (yellow card) 80'		Clarke-Salter (yellow card) 30'; Edwards (yellow card) 40'; Smyth 51'; Dunne 74'	Stadium: Ewood Park; Attendance: 12,905; Referee: Gavin Ward

1 September 2026 4	Lincoln City	0–0	Blackburn Rovers	Lincoln
19:45 BST	McGrandles (yellow card) 90+4'		Atcheson (yellow card) 13' (red card) 69'; Garrett (yellow card) 85'; Forshaw (yellow card) 90+5'	Stadium: LNER Stadium; Attendance: 10,267; Referee: Will Finnie

5 September 2026 5	Preston North End	2–1	Blackburn Rovers	Preston
12:30 BST	Lang 9', 28'; Burgzorg (yellow card) 42'; Mills (yellow card) 52'; Clarke (yellow card) 65'; Thompson (yellow card) 89'	Report	Ribeiro (yellow card) 25'; Morsy (yellow card) 40'; Mills 51' (o.g.)	Stadium: Deepdale; Attendance: 19,645; Referee: Anthony Backhouse
Note: Fixture was initially scheduled for a 15:00 kick-off, but was brought forward for live Sky Sports.

8 September 2026 6	Blackburn Rovers	1–2	Sheffield United	Blackburn
19:45 BST	Montgomery 20', (yellow card) 59'	Report	Cannon 35'; Peck 44'; Donovan (yellow card) 48'; Tanganga (yellow card) 76'	Stadium: Ewood Park; Attendance: 11,188; Referee: Matt Donohue

12 September 2026 7	Blackburn Rovers	3–1	Millwall	Blackburn
15:00 BST	Carter (yellow card) 13'; Morsy (yellow card) 38'; Afolayan 41', 58'; Pickering (yellow card) 45'; Beyuku (yellow card) 50'; Fevrier (yellow card) 86'; Guðjohnsen 90+3'	Report	Sturge (yellow card) 45+4'; Dykes 51' (pen.); Metcalfe (yellow card) 81'; Sykes (yellow card) 90+2'	Stadium: Ewood Park; Attendance: 12,330 (988 away); Referee: Josh Smith

19 September 2026 8	Portsmouth	2–2	Blackburn Rovers	Milton
15:00 BST	Swanson 4', (yellow card) 89'; Pack (yellow card) 40'; Bishop 74'	Report	Afolayan 11'; Atcheson (yellow card) 47'; Morishita 56'	Stadium: Fratton Park; Attendance: 20,244; Referee: John Busby

10 October 2026 9	Blackburn Rovers	2–1	Cardiff City	Blackburn
15:00 BST	Guðjohnsen 28'; Cantwell 38', (yellow card) 90+6'	Report	Robinson 53'	Stadium: Ewood Park; Referee: Anthony Backhouse

13 October 2026 10	Bristol City	0–1	Blackburn Rovers	Ashton Gate
19:45 BST			Afolayan 38'	Stadium: Ashton Gate Stadium; Attendance: 18,712; Referee: David Webb

17 October 2026 11	West Bromwich Albion	3–2	Blackburn Rovers	West Bromwich
15:00 BST	Stewart 19'; Campbell (yellow card) 23'; Mepham (yellow card) 41'; Price 72' (pen.); Myhre 89'		Guðjohnsen 6', 12'; Montgomery (yellow card) 21'; Afolayan (yellow card) 32'; McLoughlin (yellow card) 71'	Stadium: The Hawthorns; Referee: Adam Herczeg

24 October 2026 12	Blackburn Rovers	2–0	Wrexham	Blackburn
15:00 BST	Pickering (yellow card) 16'; Guðjohnsen 44', 79'; Morsy (yellow card) 65'; Cantwell (yellow card) 80'	Report	Hyam (yellow card) 27'; James (yellow card) 45'	Stadium: Ewood Park; Referee: Matthew Corlett

31 October 2026 13	Swansea City	4–0	Blackburn Rovers	Landore
15:00 GMT	Eustáquio 11'; Opoku 32'; Lissah 36'; Stewart 59'	Report	Baradji (yellow card) 22'	Stadium: Swansea.com Stadium; Attendance: 16,867; Referee: Gavin Ward

3 November 2026 14	Blackburn Rovers	1–2	Stoke City	Blackburn
19:45 GMT	Carter (yellow card) 33'; Kargbo (yellow card) 81'; Guðjohnsen 87', (yellow card) 90'	Report	Soumaré (yellow card) 30'; McGlynn 43'; Boženík (yellow card) 62'; Baradji 68' (o.g.); Johansson (yellow card) 74'	Stadium: Ewood Park; Referee: Andrew Kitchen

7 November 2026 15	Blackburn Rovers	2–1	West Ham United	Blackburn
15:00 GMT	Beyuku (yellow card) 34'; Guðjohnsen 54'; Montgomery (yellow card) 67'; Afolayan 71'; Kargbo (yellow card) 87'	Report	Kilman (yellow card) 72'; Piroe 82'; Engels (yellow card) 86'	Stadium: Ewood Park; Attendance: 20,471 (7,035 away); Referee: Thomas Kirk

22 November 2026 16	Burnley	2–2	Blackburn Rovers	Burnley
12:00 GMT	Ramazani 82'; Walker (yellow card) 30'; Sonne (yellow card) 45+3'; Banel 51'; Laurent (yellow card) 57'; Cullen (yellow card) 79'	Report	Guðjohnsen 31'; McLoughlin (yellow card) 60'; Beyuku (yellow card) 68'; Cantwell 74'; Carter (yellow card) 83'	Stadium: Turf Moor; Referee: Lewis Smith
Note: Fixture was initially scheduled for 21 November, but was pushed back a day for live Sky Sports and ITV Sport broadcasting.

25 November 2026 17	Watford	v	Blackburn Rovers	Watford
19:45 GMT				Stadium: Vicarage Road

28 November 2026 18	Blackburn Rovers	v	Charlton Athletic	Blackburn
12:30 GMT				Stadium: Ewood Park
Note: Fixture was initially scheduled for a 15:00 kick-off, but was brought forward for live Sky Sports broadcasting.

5 December 2026 19	Bolton Wanderers	v	Blackburn Rovers	Horwich
12:30 GMT				Stadium: Toughsheet Community Stadium
Note: Fixture was initially scheduled for a 15:00 kick-off, but was brought forward for live Sky Sports broadcasting.

8 December 2026 20	Blackburn Rovers	v	Norwich City	Blackburn
19:45 GMT				Stadium: Ewood Park

12 December 2026 21	Blackburn Rovers	v	Derby County	Blackburn
15:00 GMT				Stadium: Ewood Park

19 December 2026 22	Southampton	v	Blackburn Rovers	Southampton
15:00 GMT				Stadium: St Mary's Stadium

26 December 2026 23	Blackburn Rovers	v	Birmingham City	Blackburn
15:00 GMT				Stadium: Ewood Park

29 December 2026 24	Wrexham	v	Blackburn Rovers	Wrexham
18:00 GMT				Stadium: Racecourse Ground
Note: Fixture was initially scheduled for a 19:45 kick-off, but was brought forward for live Sky Sports broadcasting.

1 January 2027 25	Derby County	v	Blackburn Rovers	Derby
15:00 GMT				Stadium: Pride Park Stadium

16 January 2027 26	Blackburn Rovers	v	West Bromwich Albion	Blackburn
15:00 GMT				Stadium: Ewood Park

23 January 2027 27	Blackburn Rovers	v	Swansea City	Blackburn
15:00 GMT				Stadium: Ewood Park

26 January 2027 28	Stoke City	v	Blackburn Rovers	Stoke-on-Trent
19:45 GMT				Stadium: bet365 Stadium

30 January 2027 29	West Ham United	v	Blackburn Rovers	Stratford
15:00 GMT				Stadium: London Stadium

6 February 2027 30	Blackburn Rovers	v	Burnley	Blackburn
15:00 GMT				Stadium: Ewood Park
Note: Fixture was initially scheduled for 6 February, but was pushed back a day for live Sky Sports broadcasting.

13 February 2027 31	Millwall	v	Blackburn Rovers	Bermondsey
12:30 GMT				Stadium: The Den
Note: Fixture was initially scheduled for a 15:00 kick-off, but was brought forward for live Sky Sports broadcasting.

=== EFL Cup ===
Blackburn were drawn away to Burton Albion in the first round and at home to Sheffield United in the second round.

Win Draw Loss Fixtures

8 August 2026 First round	Burton Albion	1–2	Blackburn Rovers	Burton upon Trent
15:00 BST	Scutt 14'; Delap (yellow card) 28'; Dennis (yellow card) 56'	Report	Cantwell (yellow card) 32'; Guðjohnsen 81'; Fevrier 88'	Stadium: Pirelli Stadium; Attendance: 2,839; Referee: Andrew Humphries

25 August 2026 Second round	Blackburn Rovers	1–2	Sheffield United	Blackburn
19:45 BST	Afolayan 55'		Cannon 20'; Donovan 81'	Stadium: Ewood Park; Attendance: 6,826; Referee: David Webb

== Statistics ==
=== Appearances and goals ===
As of match played 7 November 2026

Players with no appearances are not included on the list

No.	Pos	Nat	Player	Total		Championship		FA Cup		EFL Cup	
No.	Pos	Nat	Player	Apps	Goals	Apps	Goals	Apps	Goals	Apps	Goals
1	GK	(England) ENG	Aynsley Pears	4	0	3+0	0	0+0	0	1+0	0
2	DF	(Nigeria) NGR	Ryan Alebiosu	14	0	13+0	0	0+0	0	1+0	0
3	DF	(England) ENG	Harry Pickering	13	0	10+1	0	0+0	0	2+0	0
4	DF	(Portugal) POR	Yuri Ribeiro	8	0	5+3	0	0+0	0	0+0	0
5	MF	(Portugal) POR	Sidnei Tavares	1	0	0+0	0	0+0	0	0+1	0
6	DF	(Northern Ireland) NIR	Tom Atcheson	11	0	10+0	0	0+0	0	1+0	0
7	FW	(Sierra Leone) SLE	Augustus Kargbo	6	0	0+6	0	0+0	0	0+0	0
8	MF	(Egypt) EGY	Sam Morsy	15	0	12+2	0	0+0	0	1+0	0
9	FW	(Iceland) ISL	Andri Guðjohnsen	15	11	11+3	10	0+0	0	0+1	1
10	MF	(England) ENG	Todd Cantwell	17	2	15+0	2	0+0	0	1+1	0
11	FW	(England) ENG	Jayden Fevrier	17	1	5+10	0	0+0	0	1+1	1
14	MF	(Belgium) BEL	Dion De Neve	2	0	0+1	0	0+0	0	1+0	0
15	DF	(Republic of Ireland) IRL	Sean McLoughlin	17	1	15+0	1	0+0	0	2+0	0
17	DF	(England) ENG	Hayden Carter	12	0	7+4	0	0+0	0	1+0	0
21	FW	(England) ENG	Dapo Afolayan	17	6	15+0	5	0+0	0	1+1	1
22	GK	(Hungary) HUN	Balázs Tóth	13	0	12+0	0	0+0	0	1+0	0
23	FW	(Japan) JPN	Yūki Ōhashi	7	0	0+5	0	0+0	0	2+0	0
24	MF	(France) FRA	Moussa Baradji	8	0	2+6	0	0+0	0	0+0	0
25	MF	(Japan) JPN	Ryōya Morishita	13	1	11+0	1	0+0	0	2+0	0
27	DF	(France) FRA	Gady Beyuku	5	0	1+4	0	0+0	0	0+0	0
28	MF	(England) ENG	Adam Forshaw	6	0	3+2	0	0+0	0	1+0	0
29	FW	(Denmark) DEN	Mathias Jørgensen	2	0	0+2	0	0+0	0	0+0	0
30	MF	(England) ENG	Jake Garrett	8	0	0+6	0	0+0	0	2+0	0
31	MF	(Scotland) SCO	Kristi Montgomery	16	1	14+0	1	0+0	0	0+2	0
39	DF	(England) ENG	Harvey Pates	2	0	0+1	0	0+0	0	0+1	0
45	FW	(England) ENG	Harvey Higgins	2	0	0+2	0	0+0	0	0+0	0
47	DF	(England) ENG	Lucas Houghton	2	0	0+1	0	0+0	0	1+0	0
53	MF	(England) ENG	Frank Vare	2	0	0+1	0	0+0	0	0+1	0

=== Goalscorers ===
As of match played 7 November 2026

Rank	No.	Pos.	Name	League	FA Cup	EFL Cup	Total
1	9	CF	(Iceland) Andri Guðjohnsen	10	0	1	11
2	21	RW	(England) Dapo Afolayan	5	0	1	6
3	10	CM	(England) Todd Cantwell	2	0	0	2
3	25	RW	(Japan) Ryōya Morishita	2	0	0	2
4	11	RW	(England) Jayden Fevrier	0	0	1	1
4	15	CB	(Republic of Ireland) Sean McLaughlin	1	0	0	1
4	31	CM	(Scotland) Kristi Montgomery	1	0	0	1
Total				21	0	3	24

=== Assists ===
As of match played 7 November 2026

Rank	No.	Pos.	Name	League	FA Cup	EFL Cup	Total
1	25	RW	(Japan) Ryōya Morishita	2	0	1	3
2	3	LB	(England) Harry Pickering	2	0	0	2
2	10	CM	(England) Todd Cantwell	1	0	1	2
2	11	RW	(England) Jayden Fevrier	2	0	0	2
2	21	RW	(England) Dapo Afolayan	2	0	0	2
6	2	RB	(Nigeria) Ryan Alebiosu	0	0	1	1
6	6	CB	(Northern Ireland) Tom Atcheson	1	0	0	1
6	8	CM	(Egypt) Sam Morsy	1	0	0	1
6	9	CF	(Iceland) Andri Guðjohnsen	1	0	0	1
6	15	CB	(Republic of Ireland) Sean McLaughlin	1	0	0	1
6	23	CF	(Japan) Yuki Ohashi	1	0	0	1
6	31	CM	(Scotland) Kristi Montgomery	1	0	0	1
Total				15	0	3	18

== Awards ==
=== Player Awards ===
==== EFL Championship Player of the Month ====
Month	Player	Result	Ref.
September	(England) Dapo Afolayan	Nominated	
October	(Iceland) Andri Guðjohnsen	Nominated	

==== EFL Championship Goal of the Month ====
Month	Player	Opposition	Result	Ref.
August	(Japan) Ryoya Morishita	v. Queens Park Rangers	Nominated	

==== PFA Player of the Month ====
Month	Player	Result	Ref.
October	(Iceland) Andri Guðjohnsen	Nominated	
