= Blackburn Rovers F.C. Under-23s and Academy =

Blackburn Rovers Academy and Under-21s
- Full name: Blackburn Rovers Academy and Under-21s
- Nicknames: Rovers, Blue and Whites, The Riversiders
- Founded: 1875; 151 years ago
- Ground: County Ground (Leyland), Leyland, Lancashire
- Capacity: ~2,300
- Head of Academy: Paul Gray
- U21 Lead Coach: Paul Butler
- League: Premier League 2 U18 Premier League
Home colours	Away colours	Third colours

Blackburn Rovers F.C. Academy and Under-21s are the youth teams of Blackburn Rovers. The Blackburn Rovers Academy holds Category One status. The current manager of the Under 21's side is Mike Sheron. The team play in the Premier League 2 Division 1, after gaining promotion from the Premier League 2 Division 2 in the 2017/18 season.

== Under-21s team ==
Blackburn Rovers Under-21s play in the Premier League 2 Division 1.

Damien Johnson is the former manager the Under-21. His predecessor, Eric Kinder left the role to take over as the club's Head of Academy. Kinder was appointed Gary Bowyer's replacement following his appointment as first team manager following two successful caretaker spells. However, the new current head of Academy at Blackburn Rovers is Paul Gray. The Under 21s play their home games at The Lancashire FA County Ground at Leyland, Preston.

The team now is mainly made up of players acquired from local academies like Manchester United, Manchester City, Liverpool and Everton. Several Under 21's players have recently made the step up into John Eustace's first team, including Lewis Travis, John Buckley, Joe Rankin-Costello and Hayden Carter.

== The Academy ==
Blackburn Rovers Academy holds Category One status, the highest possible. The club maintained this status in a full audit which took place during the 2017/18 season. The Academy trains at Brockhall training village, the same location as the first team and the Under 21s. It also provides a stepping stone for youngsters to progress to the highest levels of football at Blackburn Rovers producing high quality players in the past. Former players such as Damien Duff, Phil Jones, Damien Johnson, James Beattie, Neil Danns, Jonathan Walters, and Anthony Pilkington were all nurtured in The Academy. Current professional football players also include Jason Lowe, Martin Olsson, Grant Hanley, Josh Morris, Adam Henley, Connor Mahoney, Ryan Nyambe, David Raya and Jack O'Connell have graduated from the clubs academy. Recent graduates such as Scott Wharton and Hayden Carter among others, play for Blackburn Rovers Championship team currently.

=== History & Facilities ===
In January 1991, British industrialist and businessman Jack Walker a lifelong fan of Blackburn Rovers completed the takeover of the club. In the following years, the Brockhall Village Academy, was constructed at a cost of approximately £4.75 million. The centre included state of the art facilities on a par with top training facilities elsewhere in Europe. It includes 6 full-size pitches, indoor training facilities, an indoor running track, outdoor running "hill", a swimming pool, goalkeeper training facilities as well as accommodation for the youth players.

=== Blackburn Rovers India Academy ===
On 19 November 2010, Pune based chicken meat processing, and pharmaceutical company, Venkateshwara Hatcheries Private Limited., completed the takeover of Blackburn Rovers, under the name Venky's London Limited.

One of the companies early ambitions was to open an Academy back in their home nation of India. Managing director, told The Indian Express newspaper the club was planning a centre of excellence near Pune which is 100 km (60 miles) from Mumbai.

"We are getting an academy and a stadium in Pune," Venky's B. Balaji Rao was quoted as saying. "The site is near the Mumbai-Pune highway and will be ready in a year-and-a-half or two years." Rao said the academy, on the outskirts of the city, will be run exactly like a Rovers' training centre at Brockhall in northwest England, taking players from the age of 11 and 12. As of 2016 however no academy or stadium has been constructed.

== Squads ==
=== Development Squad ===
As of 1 July 2025

Note: Flags indicate national team as defined under FIFA eligibility rules; some limited exceptions apply. Players may hold more than one non-FIFA nationality.

No.	Pos.	Nation	Player
37	GK	ENG	Felix Goddard
—	GK	ENG	Finley Taylor
—	DF	ENG	Tino Goremusandu
47	DF	ENG	Lucas Houghton
40	DF	ENG	Matty Litherland
—	DF	ENG	Lorenze Mullarkey-Matthews
46	DF	ITA	Micheal Decandia
39	DF	ENG	Harvey Pates
—	DF	ENG	Alfie Rice

No.	Pos.	Nation	Player
48	MF	ENG	Isaac Dunn
36	MF	ENG	James Edmondson
—	MF	ENG	Freddie Leatherbarrow
—	MF	ENG	Tyler Mansbridge
—	MF	USA	Brandon Powell
53	MF	ENG	Frank Vare
—	MF	ENG	Yerime Ouattara
—	FW	ENG	Jayden Sergeant

=== Out on Loan ===
Note: Flags indicate national team as defined under FIFA eligibility rules; some limited exceptions apply. Players may hold more than one non-FIFA nationality.

No.	Pos.	Nation	Player
34	GK	ENG	Jack Barrett (on loan at Marine)
—	GK	ENG	Nicholas Michalski (on loan at Crawley Town)
—	DF	ENG	Max Davies (on loan at Southport)
—	FW	NIR	Aodhan Doherty (on loan at Falkirk)
—	FW	SLE	Osman Kamara (on loan at Crawley Town)

==== Academy (Under-18s) ====
Updated 1 July 2025.

Note: Flags indicate national team as defined under FIFA eligibility rules; some limited exceptions apply. Players may hold more than one non-FIFA nationality.

No.	Pos.	Nation	Player
—	GK	ENG	Teddy Garside
—	GK	ENG	Harry Holt
—	GK	POL	Karol Krajewski
—	DF	ENG	Theo Chimpango
—	DF	ITA	Silver Eze
—	DF	ENG	Alfie Leech
—	DF	WAL	Bruce Leeming
—	DF	ENG	Ethan Low
—	DF	ENG	Alfie McIlroy
—	DF	ENG	Archie Henderson
—	DF	NGR	David Odogun
—	DF	ENG	Xavier Nosegbe
—	DF	WAL	Theo Pitt

No.	Pos.	Nation	Player
—	MF	ENG	Levi Ball
—	MF	ENG	Charlie Clanford
—	MF	ENG	Charlie Fletcher
42	MF	ENG	Harry Lister
—	MF	ENG	Archie McCoy
—	MF	ENG	Ty Daniel Livesey
—	MF	WAL	Archie Walls
—	MF	ENG	Chase Whiffing
—	FW	ENG	Tom Cryer
—	FW	ENG	Oliver Flynn
45	FW	ENG	Harvey Higgins
—	FW	LTU	Kajus Čepas

== Noted graduates ==
Blackburn Rovers' youth system has been successful over the years. Several of these players have also moved on to play for the first-teams of other professional clubs during their careers.

=== Current/Former Rovers first teamers ===
- (Northern Ireland) Tom Atcheson
- (England) James Beattie
- (England) Marlon Broomes
- (England) John Buckley
- (England) Ben Burgess
- (England) Hayden Carter
- (England) Neil Danns
- (England) Matt Derbyshire
- (Republic of Ireland) Jonathan Douglas
- (Republic of Ireland) Damien Duff
- (England) David Dunn
- (Republic of Ireland) Rory Finneran
- (Scotland) Paul Gallagher
- (England) Jake Garrett
- (Scotland) Grant Hanley
- (Wales) Adam Henley
- (England) Keith Hill
- (Canada) Junior Hoilett
- (England) Damien Johnson
- (United States) Jemal Johnson
- (England) Phil Jones
- (England) Jake Kean
- (Republic of Ireland) Darragh Lenihan
- (England) Harry Leonard
- (England) Matty Litherland
- (England) Jason Lowe
- (Scotland) Jay McEveley
- (England) Tyler Magloire
- (England) Connor Mahoney
- (England) Josh Morris
- (Namibia) Ryan Nyambe
- (Sweden) Martin Olsson
- (Republic of Ireland) John O'Sullivan
- (Germany) Sergio Peter
- (England) George Pratt
- (England) Ashley Phillips
- (England) Joe Rankin-Costello
- (Spain) David Raya
- (England) Martin Taylor
- (Wales) James Thomas
- (England) Willem Tomlinson
- (England) Lewis Travis
- (Republic of Ireland) Keith Treacy
- (England) Adam Wharton
- (England) Scott Wharton
- (England) Jason Wilcox

=== Other notable academy graduates ===
- (England) Michael Aspin
- (England) Jason Banton
- (England) Keith Barker
- (France) Flavien Enzo Boyomo
- (Northern Ireland) Alex Bruce
- (England) Joel Byrom
- (England) James Connolly
- (England) Shaun Corcoran
- (England) Jamie Clarke
- (England) Neil Danns
- (Italy) Raffaele De Vita
- (England) Ciaran Donnelly
- (Republic of Ireland) Aaron Doran
- (England) Jack Doyle
- (England) Darren Dunning
- (England) Ryan Edwards
- (England) Frank Fielding
- (England) Andy Fisher
- (England) Joe Garner
- (England) Joe Grayson
- (Republic of Ireland) Gavin Gunning
- (Northern Ireland) Gary Hamilton
- (England) Lewis Hardcastle
- (England) Andy Haworth
- (England) Callum Hendry
- (England) Tom Hitchcock
- (Scotland) Bryan Hodge
- (Republic of Ireland) Alan Judge
- (England) Sam Lavelle
- (Australia) Jamie Maclaren
- (England) Lewis Mansell
- (England) Alex Marrow
- (England) Marcus Marshall
- (England) Eddie Nolan
- (England) John Nutter
- (England) Jack O'Connell
- (Republic of Ireland) Anthony O'Connor
- (Republic of Ireland) Josh O'Keefe
- (Nigeria) Osayamen Osawe
- (Canada) Ben Paton
- (England) Matty Pearson
- (Germany) Kevin Pezzoni
- (England) Dan Pike
- (Republic of Ireland) Anthony Pilkington
- (England) Matthew Platt
- (England) Marc Richards
- (England) Leam Richardson
- (England) Ryan Robinson
- (England) Gareth Stewart
- (Republic of Ireland) Gary Tallon
- (England) Andy Taylor
- (England) Michael Taylor
- (England) Lewis Thompson
- (England) Peter Thorne
- (England) Matthew Urwin
- (Republic of Ireland) Jonathan Walters
- (England) Jerome Watt
- (Wales) Anthony Williams
- (Wales) Ben Williams
- (England) Dean Winnard
- (England) Callum Wright
- (England) Chanka Zimba
