= Kristi Montgomery =

Scottish association football player (born 2004)

Personal information
- Full name: Kristi Julian Montgomery
- Date of birth: 31 May 2004 (age 22)
- Place of birth: Leeds, England
- Height: 1.84 m (6 ft 0 in)
- Position: Midfielder

Team information
- Current team: Blackburn Rovers
- Number: 31

Youth career
- 2013–2025: Blackburn Rovers

Senior career*
Years	Team	Apps	(Gls)
2025–	Blackburn Rovers	35	(1)
2024–2025	→ Marine (loan)	17	(1)
2025	→ Chorley (loan)	7	(1)

International career^{‡}
2019	Scotland U16	2	(0)
2025	Scotland U20	1	(0)
2025–	Scotland U21	5	(0)
2026–	Scotland	1	(0)
- * Club domestic league appearances and goals as of 17:21, 17 October 2026 (UTC) ‡ National team caps and goals as of 18 November 2025

Kristi Julian Montgomery (born 31 May 2004) is a professional footballer who plays as a midfielder for EFL Championship side Blackburn Rovers and the Scotland national team.

== Career ==
On 29 June 2022, Montgomery signed his first professional contract a two-year deal until 2024, with the option of a further 12 months. On 2 February 2024, Montgomery signed a new contract, a two-and-a half-year deal until 2026, with the option of a further 12 months.

On 6 August 2024, Montgomery joined Marine on loan with teammate Tom Atcheson until January 2025.

On 14 February 2025, Montgomery joined Chorley on a month loan, On 14 March his loan was extended until the end of the season however on 4 April he was recalled and given first team squad number 51.

On 8 April, Montgomery made his professional EFL Championship debut for Blackburn Rovers against Sheffield Wednesday, coming off the bench for Joe Rankin-Costello in a 2–2 draw. Four days later, on 12 April, he made his first Championship start in a 1–0 win over Luton Town, but was sent off after receiving a second yellow card.

On 8 September 2026, Montgomery scored his first senior goal for the club after dispossessing Sydie Peck in a 2–1 defeat to Sheffield United at Ewood Park.

== International career ==
Born in England, Montgomery is of Scottish descent through his mother. He debuted with the Scotland U21s for a set of 2027 UEFA European Under-21 Championship qualification matches in September 2025.

On 21 September 2026, Montgomery was called up to the senior Scotland squad for their upcoming UEFA Nations League games after Kieran Tierney and Kenny McLean dropped out. Montgomery made his international debut on 16 November, coming on as a substitute for Lewis Ferguson during Scotland's 4–0 defeat to Switzerland at the Sitterstadion.

== Career statistics ==
As of match played 17 October 2026

Appearances and goals by club, season and competition
Club	Season	League			National cup		League cup		Other		Total	
Club	Season	Division	Apps	Goals	Apps	Goals	Apps	Goals	Apps	Goals	Apps	Goals
Blackburn Rovers	2023–24	Championship	0	0	0	0	0	0	—		0	0
Blackburn Rovers	2024–25	Championship	3	0	0	0	0	0	—		3	0
Blackburn Rovers	2025–26	Championship	21	0	1	0	1	0	—		23	0
Blackburn Rovers	2026–27	Championship	11	1	0	0	2	0	—		13	1
Blackburn Rovers	Total		35	1	1	0	3	0	—		39	1
Marine (loan)	2024–25	National League North	17	1	1 (Note: Marine's statistics record Montgomery as making 19 appearances and scoring one goal, while Opta records 17 league appearances and one FA Trophy appearance but omits his appearance in the FA Cup tie against Stockton Town on 14 September 2024.)	0	—		1 (Note: One appearance in FA Trophy)	0	19	1
Chorley (loan)	2024–25	National League North	7	1	—		—		—		7	1
Career total			59	3	2	0	3	0	1	0	65	3

=== International ===
As of match played 16 November 2026

Appearances and goals by national team and year
National team	Year	Apps	Goals
Scotland	2026	1	0
Total		1	0
