= Harvey Higgins =

English footballer (born 2009)

Personal information
- Full name: Harvey Paul Higgins
- Date of birth: 12 January 2009 (age 17)
- Place of birth: England
- Position: Forward

Team information
- Current team: Blackburn Rovers
- Number: 45

Youth career
- 2016–2026: Blackburn Rovers

Senior career*
Years	Team	Apps	(Gls)
2026–	Blackburn Rovers	2	(0)

International career^{‡}
2024–2025	England U16		
2026–	England U17	3	(2)
- * Club domestic league appearances and goals as of 17:49, 29 September 2026 (UTC) ‡ National team caps and goals as of 17:49, 29 September 2026 (UTC)

Harvey Paul Higgins (born 12 January 2009) is an English professional footballer who plays as a forward for EFL Championship club Blackburn Rovers. A Blackburn Rovers academy graduate, he signed his first professional contract in February 2026 and made his senior debut in September 2026.

At international level, Higgins has represented England at under-16 and under-17 level. He made his England under-17 debut in March 2026 and scored twice in three appearances during UEFA European Under-17 Championship qualifying.

== Career ==
=== Club career ===
Higgins progressed through the Blackburn Rovers academy before signing his first professional contract with the club in February 2026. He made his senior debut on 5 September 2026, replacing Sam Morsy in the 74th minute of a 2–1 Championship defeat away to Preston North End in a Lancashire derby. Three days later, he made his home debut at Ewood Park against Sheffield United, playing eight minutes as Blackburn again lost by the same scoreline.

At the time of his debut, Higgins was the third-youngest player to appear in the Championship during the 2026–27 season. Manager Tony Mowbray described him as "physically ready" for senior football.

=== International career ===
Higgins represented England at under-16 level before advancing to the under-17 side. He made his under-17 debut on 25 March 2026 against the Faroe Islands in the second round of UEFA European Under-17 Championship qualifying, entering the match as a 76th-minute substitute before marking his debut with a 90th-minute goal, calmly tapping the ball into an unguarded net after receiving a pass from Oliver Boast to seal a 3–0 victory. Three days later, he started against Israel in a 3–1 defeat, before being withdrawn in the 63rd minute. On 31 March, he again started against Estonia and struck in the 90th minute to score England's second goal in a 2–0 victory. He ended the qualification campaign with three appearances and two goals.

== Personal life ==
Raised in Blackburn, Higgins is a lifelong Blackburn Rovers supporter. He has credited his parents, family and friends with supporting his football development and transition into senior football. He has also cited Adam Wharton, another Blackburn Rovers academy graduate, as a player he looked up to, expressing his hope of following Wharton's path from the club's academy to the first team.

== Career statistics ==
As of match played on 8 September 2026

Appearances and goals by club, season and competition
Club	Season	League			National cup		League cup		Other		Total	
Club	Season	Division	Apps	Goals	Apps	Goals	Apps	Goals	Apps	Goals	Apps	Goals
Blackburn Rovers	2026–27	Championship	2	0	0	0	0	0	0	0	2	0
Career total			2	0	0	0	0	0	0	0	2	0
