= Adam Khan (footballer) =

Pakistani footballer

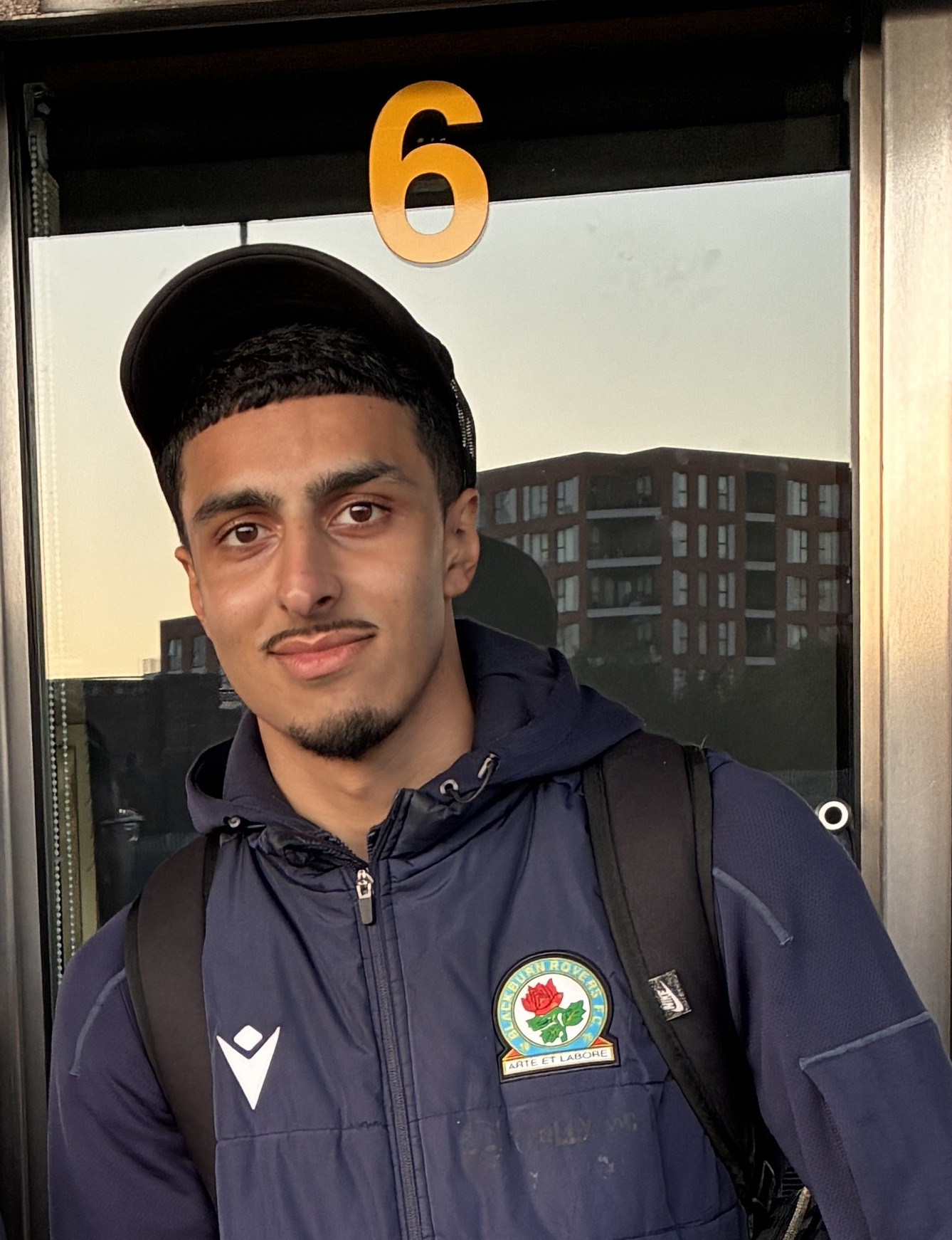
- Adam Khan in 2026.

Personal information
- Full name: Adam Najeeb Khan
- Date of birth: 24 October 2005 (age 21)
- Place of birth: Berkshire, England
- Position: Goalkeeper

Youth career
- Crystal Palace
- 2022–2024: Blackburn Rovers

Senior career*
| Years | Team | Apps | (Gls) |
| 2024–2026 | Blackburn Rovers | 0 | (0) |
| 2024 | →City of Liverpool (loan) | 2 | (0) |

International career^{‡}
| 2025 | Pakistan U23 | 2 | (0) |
| 2025– | Pakistan | 1 | (0) |
- * Club domestic league appearances and goals as of 00:16, 20 November 2025 (UTC) ‡ National team caps and goals as of 00:16, 20 November 2025 (UTC)

Adam Najeeb Khan (Urdu: آدم خان; born 24 October 2005) is a professional footballer who most recently played as a goalkeeper for the EFL Championship club Blackburn Rovers. Born in England, he has also played for the Pakistan national team.

== Club career ==
Khan is a product of the youth academies of the English clubs Crystal Palace and Blackburn Rovers. On 3 July 2024, he signed his first professional contract with Blackburn Rovers for one season with an option to extend for another. On 12 November 2024, he joined Northern Premier League side City of Liverpool on a short-term loan. On 19 May 2025, Blackburn Rovers triggered the option to extend his contract for another season. On 19 May 2026, Rovers announced Khan would leave the club when his contract expired on 30 June 2026.

In October 2026, Khan went on trial with Reading, and was named on the bench for their Academy's Premier League 2 against Liverpool on 17 October 2026.

== International career ==
Born in England, Khan is of Pakistani descent and holds dual British and Pakistani citizenship. In May 2025, he was called up to the Pakistan national team for a training camp. He was called up to the Pakistan U23s for a set of 2026 AFC U-23 Asian Cup qualification matches in September 2025. In November 2025, he was formally called up to the senior national team for a set of 2027 AFC Asian Cup qualification matches. He made his debut on 18 November 2025 in Pakistan's 5–0 defeat by Syria in Islamabad.
