= Sean McLoughlin (footballer) =

Irish footballer (born 1996)

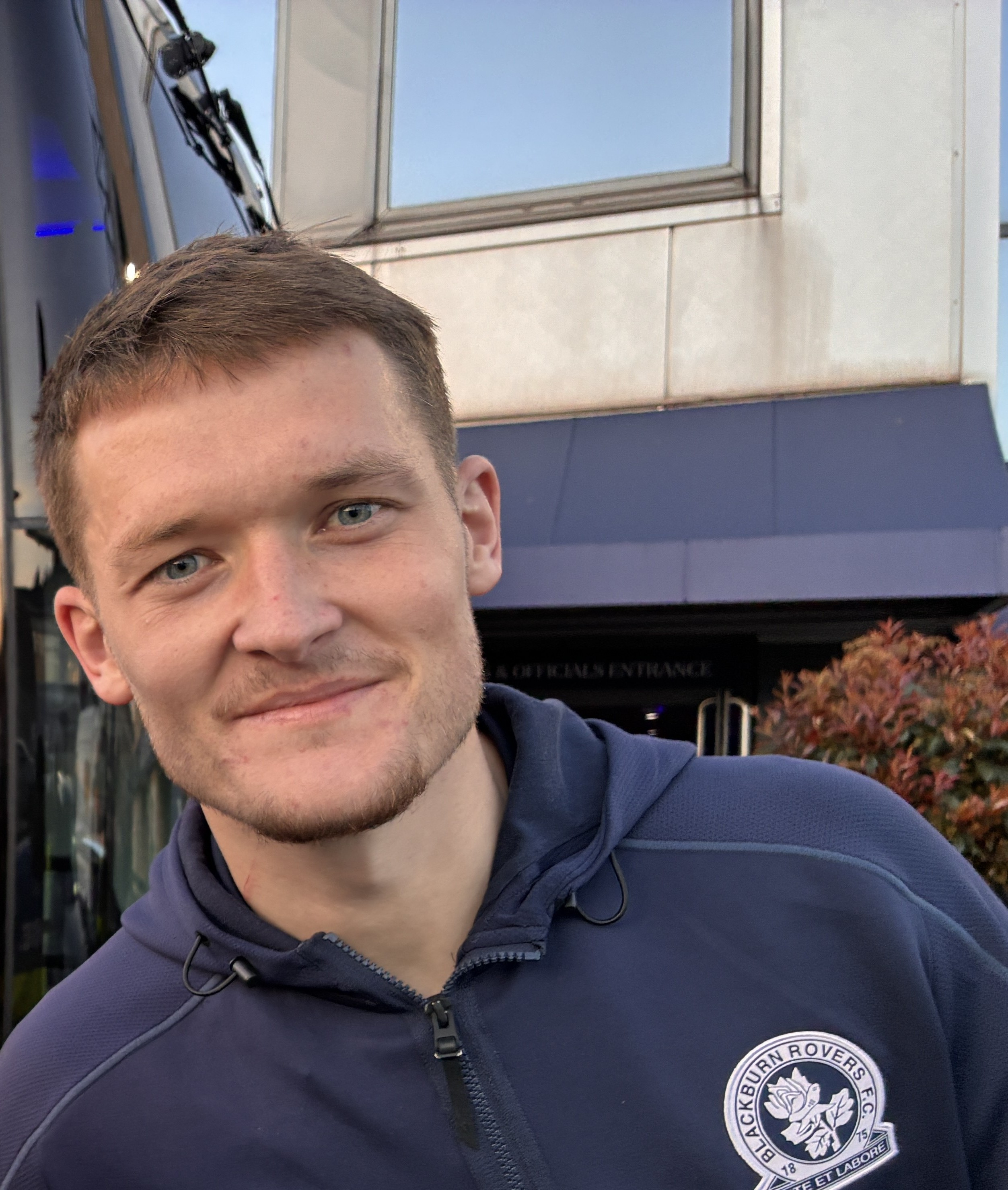
- McLoughlin with Blackburn Rovers in 2026

Personal information
- Full name: Sean Desmond McLoughlin
- Date of birth: 13 November 1996 (age 30)
- Place of birth: Cork, Ireland
- Height: 1.91 m (6 ft 3 in)
- Position: Defender

Team information
- Current team: Blackburn Rovers
- Number: 15

Youth career
- Springfield Ramblers
- 2013–2015: Cork City
- 2015–2016: College Corinthians
- 2016–2017: UCC

Senior career*
| Years | Team | Apps | (Gls) |
| 2017–2019 | Cork City | 48 | (5) |
| 2019–2025 | Hull City | 129 | (0) |
| 2019 | → St Mirren (loan) | 21 | (1) |
| 2025– | Blackburn Rovers | 60 | (1) |

International career
- Republic of Ireland U21
- * Club domestic league appearances and goals as of 14:42, 22 November 2026 (UTC)

Sean Desmond McLoughlin (born 13 November 1996) is an Irish professional footballer who plays as a defender for EFL Championship club Blackburn Rovers.

== Club career ==
=== Early career ===
Born in Cork, McLoughlin signed for Cork City in 2013 after previously playing for Springfield Ramblers. He moved to College Corinthians in 2015, returning to Cork City in 2017 after a spell with UCC. He made his debut for Cork City in October 2017. He signed a new 18-month contract in July 2018.

=== Hull City ===
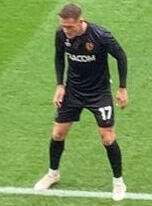
McLoughlin with Hull City in 2022.

McLoughlin signed for Hull City in July 2019. He moved on loan to Scottish club St Mirren later that month. McLoughlin was an ever-present for St Mirren in the first part of the 2019–20 Scottish Premiership season, and returned to Hull at the end of the loan on 31 December 2019.

He made his first start for Hull on 8 February 2020 in a 1–1 draw away to Reading.

On 5 March 2021, McLoughlin signed a new three-year contract with Hull City.

In March 2023, McLoughlin was named Hull City Player of the Month for February.

On 18 April 2023, McLoughlin signed a new three-year contract with the club.

=== Blackburn Rovers ===
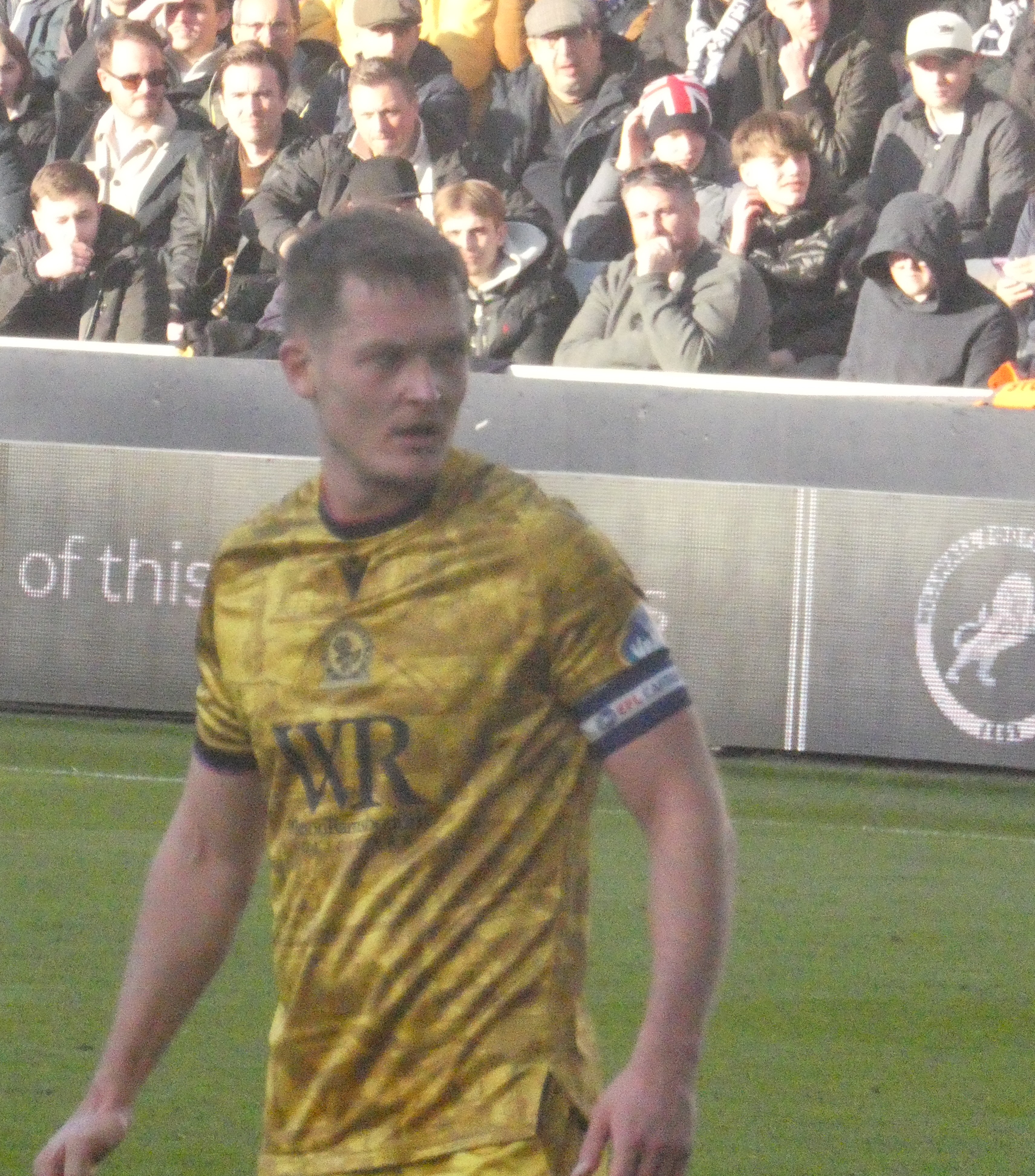
McLoughlin playing for Blackburn Rovers in 2026.

On 19 July 2025, McLoughlin signed for fellow Championship club Blackburn Rovers on an initial two-year deal for an undisclosed fee.

McLoughlin scored his first goal for the club and his first in English football in the opening round of the 2026–27 season, equalising against Wolverhampton Wanderers at Molineux Stadium in a 2–2 draw.

On 10 November 2026, McLoughlin signed a contract extension with the club for an undisclosed duration.

== International career ==
McLoughlin has represented Ireland at under-21 level.

== Playing style ==
Primarily a central defender, McLoughlin made his debut in October 2017 as a left-back.

== Career statistics ==
As of match played 22 November 2026.

| Club | Season | League | | | National Cup | | League Cup | | Europe | | Other | | Total | |
| Club | Season | Division | Apps | Goals | Apps | Goals | Apps | Goals | Apps | Goals | Apps | Goals | Apps | Goals |
|---|---|---|---|---|---|---|---|---|---|---|---|---|---|---|
| Cork City | 2017 | League of Ireland Premier Division | 1 | 0 | 0 | 0 | 0 | 0 | 0 (Note: Appearances in UEFA Europa League) | 0 | — | | 1 | 0 |
| Cork City | 2018 | League of Ireland Premier Division | 27 | 3 | 3 | 0 | 1 | 0 | 4 (Note: 2 appearances in UEFA Champions League & 2 appearances in UEFA Europa League) | 0 | 3 (Note: 1 appearance in President's Cup and 2 appearances in Munster Senior Cup) | 0 | 38 | 3 |
| Cork City | 2019 | League of Ireland Premier Division | 20 | 2 | — | | 2 | 0 | 2 | 0 | 2 (Note: 1 appearance in President's Cup and 1 appearance in Munster Senior Cup) | 0 | 26 | 2 |
| Cork City | Total | | 48 | 5 | 3 | 0 | 3 | 0 | 6 | 0 | 5 | 0 | 65 | 5 |
| Hull City | 2019–20 | EFL Championship | 7 | 0 | 0 | 0 | — | | — | | — | | 7 | 0 |
| Hull City | 2020–21 | EFL League One | 3 | 0 | 1 | 0 | 2 | 0 | — | | 6 (Note: Appearances in the EFL Trophy) | 0 | 12 | 0 |
| Hull City | 2021–22 | EFL Championship | 32 | 0 | 1 | 0 | 0 | 0 | — | | 0 | 0 | 33 | 0 |
| Hull City | 2022–23 | EFL Championship | 26 | 0 | 1 | 0 | 1 | 0 | — | | 0 | 0 | 28 | 0 |
| Hull City | 2023–24 | EFL Championship | 23 | 0 | 2 | 0 | 1 | 0 | — | | 0 | 0 | 26 | 0 |
| Hull City | 2024–25 | EFL Championship | 36 | 0 | 1 | 0 | 1 | 0 | — | | 0 | 0 | 38 | 0 |
| Hull City | Total | | 129 | 0 | 6 | 0 | 5 | 0 | 0 | 0 | 6 | 0 | 146 | 0 |
| St Mirren (loan) | 2019–20 | Scottish Premiership | 21 | 1 | — | | — | | — | | — | | 21 | 1 |
| Blackburn Rovers | 2025–26 | EFL Championship | 44 | 0 | 1 | 0 | 0 | 0 | — | | — | | 45 | 0 |
| Blackburn Rovers | 2026–27 | EFL Championship | 16 | 1 | 0 | 0 | 2 | 0 | — | | — | | 18 | 1 |
| Blackburn Rovers | Total | | 60 | 1 | 1 | 0 | 2 | 0 | 0 | 0 | 0 | 0 | 63 | 1 |
| Career Total | | | 259 | 7 | 10 | 0 | 10 | 0 | 6 | 0 | 11 | 0 | 295 | 7 |
