= Augustus Kargbo =

Sierra Leonean footballer (born 1999)

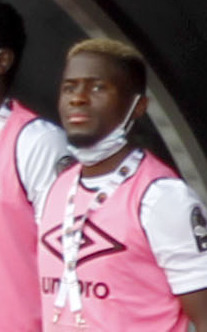
- Kargbo in 2022

Personal information
- Full name: Augustus Kargbo
- Date of birth: 24 August 1999 (age 27)
- Place of birth: Freetown, Sierra Leone
- Height: 1.72 m (5 ft 8 in)
- Position: Forward

Team information
- Current team: Blackburn Rovers
- Number: 7

Senior career*
| Years | Team | Apps | (Gls) |
| 2017–2018 | Campobasso | 20 | (6) |
| 2018–2023 | Crotone | 68 | (6) |
| 2018–2019 | → Roccella (loan) | 11 | (3) |
| 2019–2020 | → Reggiana (loan) | 24 | (11) |
| 2020–2021 | → Reggiana (loan) | 20 | (2) |
| 2023–2025 | Cesena | 51 | (13) |
| 2025– | Blackburn Rovers | 21 | (1) |

International career^{‡}
| 2021– | Sierra Leone | 24 | (5) |
- * Club domestic league appearances and goals as of 01:26, 25 October 2026 (UTC) ‡ National team caps and goals as of 8 October 2025

Augustus Kargbo (born 24 August 1999) is a Sierra Leonean professional footballer who plays as a forward for EFL Championship club Blackburn Rovers.

== Early career ==
As a boy Augustus Kargbo was scouted by his agent Numukeh Tunkara in Freetown, Sierra Leone aged 13 years. Believing in his quality he then persuaded the family to allow him to take the boy to Guinea where he could have a better training and development opportunity.

== Club career ==
Kargbo started his professional career with Serie D club Campobasso. In the summer of 2018, he joined Serie B club Crotone and was loaned back to Serie D, to Rocella. He returned from loan in January 2019. He made his Serie B debut for Crotone on 19 January 2019 in a game against Cittadella, as a 68th-minute substitute for Marco Firenze.

On 2 September 2019, Kargbo joined Reggiana on loan. On 22 July, he scored an important goal for the promotion of the club in Serie B in the final against Bari. He made his Serie A debut for Crotone on 20 September 2020 in a 1–4 away loss against Genoa. On 29 September 2020 he returned to Reggiana on a new loan.

On 26 August 2023, Kargbo signed a three-year contract with Cesena. On 31 January 2025, Kargbo signed for EFL Championship club Blackburn Rovers on a two-and-a-half-year deal for an undisclosed fee. On 15 February 2025, Kargbo assisted Tyrhys Dolan in a 2–0 win over Plymouth Argyle.

On 1 October 2025, Kargbo was involved in the build-up to the winning goal in a 2–1 defeat to Swansea City, losing possession near the halfway line which led to a counter-attack and an eventual goal scored by Liam Cullen. Following the match, Kargbo temporarily deactivated his Instagram account after receiving online abuse.

Later that week, on 5 October 2025, Kargbo scored his first goal for the club, netting the equaliser in a 1–1 draw with Stoke City.

== International career ==
On 29 September 2020, he was called up by Sierra Leone for the first team. He made his debut for the Sierra Leone national football team on 6 October 2021 in a friendly against South Sudan.

In December 2021, he was named in the Sierra Leone squad for the upcoming 2021 Africa Cup of Nations as the nation prepared for their first appearance at the competition since 1996.

== Career statistics ==
=== Club ===
As of match played 24 October 2026

Appearances and goals by club, season and competition
| Club | Season | League | | | National cup (Note: Includes Coppa Italia, FA Cup) | | League cup | | Other | | Total | |
| Club | Season | Division | Apps | Goals | Apps | Goals | Apps | Goals | Apps | Goals | Apps | Goals |
|---|---|---|---|---|---|---|---|---|---|---|---|---|
| Campobasso | 2017–18 | Serie D | 20 | 6 | — | | — | | — | | 20 | 6 |
| Crotone | 2018–19 | Serie B | 5 | 0 | 0 | 0 | — | | — | | 5 | 0 |
| Crotone | 2019–20 | Serie B | 0 | 0 | 0 | 0 | — | | — | | 0 | 0 |
| Crotone | 2020–21 | Serie A | 1 | 0 | 0 | 0 | — | | — | | 1 | 0 |
| Crotone | 2021–22 | Serie B | 32 | 3 | 1 | 0 | — | | — | | 33 | 3 |
| Crotone | 2022–23 | Serie C | 30 | 3 | 0 | 0 | — | | — | | 30 | 3 |
| Crotone | Total | | 68 | 6 | 1 | 0 | — | | — | | 69 | 6 |
| Roccella (loan) | 2018–19 | Serie D | 11 | 3 | — | | — | | — | | 11 | 3 |
| Reggiana (loan) | 2019–20 | Serie C | 24 | 11 | 0 | 0 | — | | — | | 24 | 11 |
| Reggiana (loan) | 2020–21 | Serie B | 20 | 2 | 1 | 0 | — | | — | | 21 | 2 |
| Reggiana (loan) | Total | | 44 | 13 | 1 | 0 | — | | — | | 45 | 13 |
| Cesena | 2023–24 | Serie C | 33 | 10 | 0 | 0 | — | | — | | 33 | 10 |
| Cesena | 2024–25 | Serie B | 18 | 3 | 3 | 1 | — | | — | | 21 | 4 |
| Cesena | Total | | 51 | 13 | 3 | 1 | — | | — | | 54 | 14 |
| Blackburn Rovers | 2024–25 | Championship | 8 | 0 | 1 | 0 | 0 | 0 | — | | 9 | 0 |
| Blackburn Rovers | 2025–26 | Championship | 10 | 1 | 0 | 0 | 1 | 0 | — | | 11 | 1 |
| Blackburn Rovers | 2026–27 | Championship | 3 | 0 | 0 | 0 | 0 | 0 | — | | 3 | 0 |
| Blackburn Rovers | Total | | 21 | 1 | 1 | 0 | 1 | 0 | — | | 23 | 1 |
| Career total | | | 215 | 42 | 6 | 1 | 1 | 0 | 0 | 0 | 222 | 43 |

=== International ===
As of match played 8 October 2025

Appearances and goals by national team and year
| National team | Year | Apps | Goals |
|---|---|---|---|
| Sierra Leone | 2021 | 2 | 0 |
| Sierra Leone | 2022 | 6 | 1 |
| Sierra Leone | 2023 | 6 | 1 |
| Sierra Leone | 2024 | 6 | 3 |
| Sierra Leone | 2025 | 4 | 0 |
| Total | | 24 | 5 |

=== International goals ===
| No. | Date | Venue | Opponent | Score | Result | Competition |
|---|---|---|---|---|---|---|
| 1. | 13 June 2022 | General Lansana Conté Stadium, Conakry, Guinea | Guinea-Bissau | 1–2 | 2–2 | 2023 Africa Cup of Nations qualification |
| 2. | 18 June 2023 | Samuel Kanyon Doe Sports Complex, Paynesville, Liberia | Nigeria | 2–2 | 2–3 | 2023 Africa Cup of Nations qualification |
| 3. | 5 June 2024 | Ben M'Hamed El Abdi Stadium, El Jadida, Morocco | Djibouti | 2–1 | 2–1 | 2026 FIFA World Cup qualification |
| 4. | 10 June 2024 | Stade du 26 Mars, Bamako, Mali | Burkina Faso | 1–2 | 2–2 | 2026 FIFA World Cup qualification |
| 5. | 10 September 2024 | Levy Mwanawasa Stadium, Ndola, Zambia | Zambia | 1–1 | 2–3 | 2025 Africa Cup of Nations qualification |
