= Gady Beyuku =

French footballer (born 2005)

- Beyuku in 2026

Personal information
- Full name: Gady-Pierre Beyuku Bowutankoyi
- Date of birth: 23 November 2005 (age 20)
- Place of birth: Clichy, France
- Height: 1.88 m (6 ft 2 in)
- Position: Right-back

Team information
- Current team: Blackburn Rovers
- Number: 27

Youth career
- 2015–2018: FC Boissy
- 2018: Paris 13 Atletico
- 2018–2019: FC Boissy
- 2019–2020: ES Trappes
- 2020–2023: Versailles
- 2023–2024: FC 93
- 2024: Triestina

Senior career*
Years	Team	Apps	(Gls)
2024–2026	Modena	44	(3)
2026–	Blackburn Rovers	2	(0)

International career^{‡}
2025–	France U20	9	(0)
- * Club domestic league appearances and goals as of 16:29, 16 October 2026 (UTC) ‡ National team caps and goals as of 23:30, 18 October 2025 (UTC)

Gady-Pierre Beyuku Bowutankoyi (born 23 November 2005) is a French professional footballer who plays as a right-back for EFL Championship club Blackburn Rovers.

== Club career ==
Beyuku is a product of the youth academies of the French clubs FC Boissy, Paris 13 Atletico, ES Trappes, Versailles, and FC 93, before finishing his development with the Italian club Triestina in 2024. After a half season with Triestina, Beyuku transferred to Modena in the summer of 2024. He made his senior and professional debut with Modena in a 3–0 Serie B win over Juve Stabia on 21 September 2024.

=== Blackburn Rovers ===
On 2 September 2026, Beyuku joined EFL Championship club Blackburn Rovers on a long-term contract. He made his debut six days later on 8 September, coming on as a substitute for Sam Morsy in a 2–1 defeat to Sheffield United at Ewood Park.

== International career ==
Born in France, Beyuku is of DR Congolese descent and holds dual French-Congolese citizenship. He was called up to the France U20s for the 2025 FIFA U-20 World Cup.

== Career statistics ==
As of match played 12 September 2026

Club	Season	League			National cup (Note: Includes appearance(s) in the Coppa Italia)		League cup		Total	
Club	Season	Division	Apps	Goals	Apps	Goals	Apps	Goals	Apps	Goals
Modena	2024–25	Serie B	13	2	0	0	–		13	2
Modena	2025–26	Serie B	31	1	1	0	–		32	1
Modena	Total		44	3	1	0	–		45	3
Blackburn Rovers	2026–27	Championship	2	0	0	0	–		2	0
Career total			46	3	0	0	0	0	47	3
