= Burial of the Coffin =

Football fan tradition

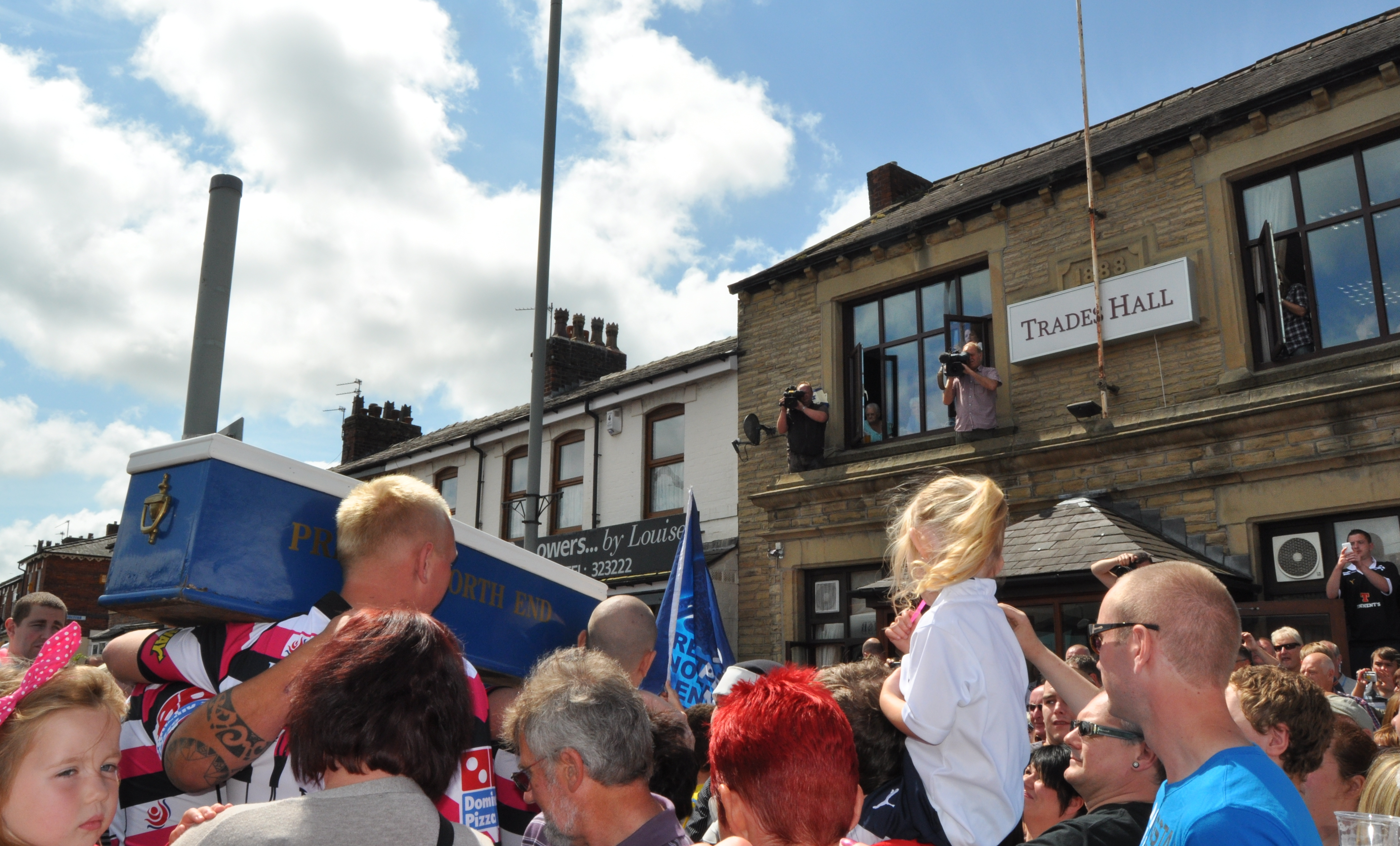
A Preston North End coffin being buried in 2011 when the club were relegated to League One.

In a tradition going back to 1948, fans of Blackburn Rovers and Preston North End bury a coffin of relegation in the cellar of the Trades Halls club in Bamber Bridge. Supporters take to the streets of Bamber Bridge for a carnival style burial of a club-branded coffin to mark their team's relegation.

The event has happened whenever either of the two teams have been relegated and the coffin has then been 'raised' when either side has been promoted again. The parade started in 1948 after a greengrocer in Bamber Bridge packed a coffin full of vegetables and buried it following Blackburn’s relegation to the old Division Two. The vegetables were supposed to represent the players in the team, although nowadays a dummy called Chucky lies in the coffin in the club kit.

== History ==
After Blackburn's promotion back to the Premier League in 2000–01, the coffin was paraded down Station Road in a cortege of five carnival-type milk floats headed by bands, dancers, fire crews and people dressed as bishops and nuns.

A burial was held ahead of the start of the 2011–12 campaign, on Sunday 24 July 2011, after Preston were relegated from the Football League Championship the previous season. The procession started from Church Road at the south end of Station Road in Bamber Bridge, close to Ye Old Hob Inn public house.

There was another procession after the 2011–12 season after Blackburn Rovers were relegated to the Championship after an 11-year stay in the Premier League, however this was held in Blackburn on police advice. The funeral procession went from the Fox and Hounds pub on Albion Road to The Aqueduct pub on Bolton Road near Ewood Park.

The last Preston raising occurred on Sunday 12 July 2015 after Preston's promotion from League One back to the Championship and the coffin was driven in a hearse and paraded around.

Another burial occurred in July 2017 after Blackburn's relegation to League One, but the coffin was raised again on Sunday 22 July 2018 after their immediate promotion back to the Championship.

== Events ==
Club	Coffin Buried	Coffin Raised
Blackburn Rovers	1948 – 1966 – 1971 – 1979 – 1999 – 2012 – 2017	1958 – 1975 – 1980 – 1992 – 2001 – 2018
Preston North End	1949 – 1961 – 1970 – 1974 – 1981 – 1985 – 1993 – 2011	1951 – 1971 – 1978 – 1987 – 1996 – 2000 – 2015
