= Aodhan Doherty =

Northern Irish association football player

Personal information
- Full name: Aodhan Patrick Doherty
- Date of birth: 3 May 2006 (age 20)
- Place of birth: Belfast, Northern Ireland
- Height: 1.76 m (5 ft 9 in)
- Position: Right winger

Team information
- Current team: Falkirk (on loan from Blackburn Rovers)
- Number: 47

Youth career
- –2023: Linfield

Senior career*
| Years | Team | Apps | (Gls) |
| 2023–2024 | Linfield | 9 | (0) |
| 2024– | Blackburn Rovers | 3 | (0) |
| 2026– | → Falkirk (loan) | 0 | (0) |

International career^{‡}
| 2023 | Northern Ireland U17 | 3 | (0) |
| 2024– | Northern Ireland U18 | 1 | (0) |
| 2024 | Northern Ireland U19 | 9 | (0) |
| 2025– | Northern Ireland U21 | 2 | (0) |
- * Club domestic league appearances and goals as of 17:04 (UTC) 24 January 2026 ‡ National team caps and goals as of 22:14, 18 November 2025 (UTC)

Aodhan Patrick Doherty (born 3 May 2006) is a Northern Irish footballer who plays as a right winger for Scottish Premiership club Falkirk, on loan from EFL Championship club Blackburn Rovers, as a forward. He is a Northern Ireland youth international.

== Club career ==
In September 2023, he signed a three-year professional contract with Linfield. He made his senior Linfield that month in the County Antrim Shield. He went on to make his debut in the NIFL Premiership that season. He made a total of 13 appearances in all competitions for Linfield as an 18 year-old during the 2023–24 season.

He signed a three-year contract with EFL Championship side Blackburn Rovers in June 2024. He scored for Blackburn in the 2024–25 National League Cup against Forest Green Rovers. On 11 January 2026, Doherty made his debut in a 0–0 draw with Hull City in the FA Cup. During the penalty shoot-out, Doherty scored his spot-kick, although Rovers were eliminated after losing 4–3 on penalties.

On 25 July 2026, Doherty signed a new contract with the club, before completing a season-long loan move to Scottish Premiership side Falkirk. He made his debut for the club the following day, coming on as a substitute in a 3–1 victory over Stranraer in the Scottish League Cup.

== International career ==
He represented Northern Ireland at U17 level. He made his debut for Northern Ireland U18 against England U18 at St. George's Park in May 2024. He featured for Northern Ireland U19 at the European U19 Championships in 2024.

== Career statistics ==
As of match played 26 July 2026

Appearances and goals by club, season and competition
| Club | Season | League | | | National Cup (Note: Includes appearances in the Irish Cup, FA Cup) | | League Cup (Note: Includes appearances in the League Cup, Scottish League Cup) | | Other | | Total | |
| Club | Season | Division | Apps | Goals | Apps | Goals | Apps | Goals | Apps | Goals | Apps | Goals |
|---|---|---|---|---|---|---|---|---|---|---|---|---|
| Linfield | 2023–24 | Premiership | 9 | 0 | 2 | 0 | 3 | 0 | 0 | 0 | 14 | 0 |
| Blackburn Rovers | 2025–26 | Championship | 3 | 0 | 1 | 0 | 0 | 0 | — | | 4 | 0 |
| Falkirk (loan) | 2026–27 | Scottish Premiership | 0 | 0 | 0 | 0 | 1 | 0 | — | | 1 | 0 |
| Career total | | | 12 | 0 | 3 | 0 | 4 | 0 | 0 | 0 | 19 | 0 |
