= Matty Litherland =

English footballer

Personal information
- Full name: Matthew Isaac Mark Litherland
- Date of birth: 31 October 2005 (age 21)
- Place of birth: Blackburn, England
- Height: 1.85 m (6 ft 1 in)
- Positions: Centre-back; right-back; right wing-back

Team information
- Current team: Blackburn Rovers
- Number: 40

Youth career
- 2012–2025: Blackburn Rovers

Senior career*
Years	Team	Apps	(Gls)
2025–	Blackburn Rovers	5	(0)
2025	→ Curzon Ashton (loan)	6	(0)
- * Club domestic league appearances and goals as of 17:02, 2 May 2026 (UTC)

Matthew Isaac Mark Litherland (born 31 October 2005) is an English professional footballer who plays as a centre-back or right wing-back for EFL Championship club Blackburn Rovers.

== Club career ==
A youth product of Blackburn Rovers since the age of 6, Litherland signed his first contract with the club on 4 July 2024 for 1 season. He joined Curzon Ashton on a short-term loan in the Northern Premier League on 21 March 2025. He extended his contract with Blackburn Rovers on 12 May 2025 until 2027. On 20 December 2025, he debuted with Blackburn Rovers in a 2–0 EFL Championship win over Millwall, where he earned the Player of the Match award.

== Career statistics ==
As of match played on 2 May 2026

Appearances and goals by club, season and competition
Club	Season	League			National cup		League Cup		Other		Total	
Club	Season	Division	Apps	Goals	Apps	Goals	Apps	Goals	Apps	Goals	Apps	Goals
Blackburn Rovers	2024–25	Championship	0	0	0	0	0	0	—		0	0
Blackburn Rovers	2025–26	Championship	5	0	0	0	0	0	—		5	0
Blackburn Rovers	2026–27	Championship	0	0	0	0	0	0	—		0	0
Blackburn Rovers	Total		5	0	0	0	0	0	—		5	0
Curzon Ashton (loan)	2024–25	National League	6	0	—		—		—		6	0
Career total			11	0	0	0	0	0	0	0	11	0
