= Felix Goddard =

English footballer (born 2004)

Personal information
- Full name: Felix Benjamin Goddard
- Date of birth: 9 March 2004 (age 22)
- Place of birth: Frankfurt, Germany
- Height: 1.84 m (6 ft 0 in)
- Position: Goalkeeper

Team information
- Current team: Blackburn Rovers
- Number: 37

Youth career
- 2013–2017: JSSL Singapore
- 2017–2020: Manchester City
- 2020–2021: Blackburn Rovers

Senior career*
Years	Team	Apps	(Gls)
2021–	Blackburn Rovers	0	(0)
2021	→ Lancaster City (loan)	1	(0)
2022	→ Lancaster City (loan)	1	(0)
2022–2023	→ Bamber Bridge (loan)	24	(0)
2023	→ Bamber Bridge (loan)	8	(0)
2023	→ Marine (loan)	17	(0)
2024	→ Dundalk (loan)	6	(0)
2025	→ Ebbsfleet United (loan)	1	(0)
- * Club domestic league appearances and goals as of 18:54, 10 May 2025 (UTC)

Felix Benjamin Goddard (born 9 March 2004) is an English professional footballer who plays as a goalkeeper for EFL Championship side Blackburn Rovers.

== Early life ==
Goddard was born in Frankfurt, Germany to British parents and moved to Singapore in 2006 at the age of 2. He attended Tanglin Trust School.

== Career ==
=== Youth career ===
Having been in Singapore for seven years, Goddard joined JSSL Singapore aged 9 in 2013 and he reverted from being a defender to goalkeeper, whilst under the guidance of former Singapore international goalkeeper, Rezal Hassan. In November 2017, 17-year-old Goddard left Singapore for England and signed for Premier League side Manchester City.

On 9 November 2017, Goddard joined Manchester City and was immediately put into their U-13 side, After progressing through various age categories at Manchester City; which included appearances for the Under-18's and Under-21's, Goddard was released by the club in the summer of 2020.

=== Blackburn Rovers ===
On 28 September 2020, after being on a two-week trial for the under-18's side at Blackburn Rovers, Goddard penned a two-year scholarship deal with the club, and on 25 June 2022, he signed a two-year professional contract with an option of a further year. On 3 August 2023, over a year after signing his pro deal, Goddard penned a new initial two-year deal with Rovers, which ties him down until the summer of 2025. On 4 June 2025, Goddard signed a two-year contract; which ties him down at Blackburn until the summer of 2027.

=== Lancaster City (loan) ===
On 10 December 2021, Goddard was loaned out to Northern Premier League Premier Division side Lancaster City on loan until the 18 December; following an injury to fellow Blackburn loanee goalkeeper, Aidan Dowling. He made his debut for the club a day later during the league game against Basford United; and kept a clean sheet in a 1–0 win for The Dolly Blues at the Giant Axe. He returned to his parent club, Blackburn at the conclusion of the loan and on 28 January 2022, Goddard returned to Lancaster City on loan; following the departure of Wyll Stanway to a club higher up the league pyramid. However, he went off injured a day later after suffering a suspected broken collarbone - after being involved in a collision with an attacker and defender; during a 2–1 home win against Radcliffe.

=== Bamber Bridge (loan) ===
On 2 July 2022, after signing his professional contract at Ewood Park, Goddard was loaned back to the Northern Premier League Premier Division, as he joined Bamber Bridge on loan for six months. After being a main stay in between the sticks for Brig, Goddard returned to parent club, Blackburn - after he picked up a knee injury, which ruled him out for two months. On 9 March 2023, after recovering from the knee injury, Goddard re-joined Bamber Bridge on loan until the end of the season.

=== Marine (loan) ===
On 3 August 2023, Goddard was loaned out to another Northern Premier League Premier Division side in Marine on a deal until the end of the campaign, on 16 December, after making 17 league appearances for Marine, Goddard was recalled by his parent club, after suffering a meniscus tear in the 1–0 defeat against Morpeth Town four days earlier.

=== Dundalk (loan) ===
On 11 July 2024, Goddard was loaned out League of Ireland side Dundalk until the end of the campaign, and he made his professional league debut a day later; playing the whole 90 minutes as Dundalk beat Drogheda United 4–2 at Oriel Park. Seven days later, Goddard made his professional debut in cup football as Dundalk lost 2–1 against Drogheda United in the Second Round of the FAI Cup; during the game he made an error, by fumbling the ball into his own net following a shot by Drogheda debutant, James Bolger.

=== Ebbsfleet United (loan) ===
On 7 January 2025, Goddard joined Ebbsfleet United on loan until the end of the season.

== Career statistics ==
As of match played 5 May 2025

Appearances and goals by club, season and competition
Club	Season	League			National cup (Note: Includes FA Cup & FAI Cup)		League cup (Note: Includes EFL Cup & National League Cup)		Other		Total	
Club	Season	Division	Apps	Goals	Apps	Goals	Apps	Goals	Apps	Goals	Apps	Goals
Blackburn Rovers	2021–22	Championship	0	0	0	0	0	0	—		0	0
Blackburn Rovers	2022–23	Championship	0	0	0	0	0	0	—		0	0
Blackburn Rovers	2023–24	Championship	0	0	0	0	0	0	—		0	0
Blackburn Rovers	2024–25	Championship	0	0	0	0	0	0	—		0	0
Blackburn Rovers	2025–26	Championship	0	0	0	0	0	0	—		0	0
Blackburn Rovers	2026–27	Championship	0	0	0	0	0	0	—		0	0
Blackburn Rovers	Total		0	0	0	0	0	0	—		0	0
Lancaster City (loan)	2021–22	Northern Premier League; Premier Division	1	0	—		—		—		1	0
Lancaster City (loan)	2021–22	Northern Premier League; Premier Division	1	0	—		—		—		1	0
Bamber Bridge (loan)	2022–23	Northern Premier League; Premier Division	24	0	3	0	—		1 (Note: Appearance(s) in FA Trophy)	0	28	0
Bamber Bridge (loan)	2022–23	Northern Premier League; Premier Division	8	0	—		—		1 (Note: 1 appearance in Play-offs)	0	9	0
Marine (loan)	2023–24	Northern Premier League; Premier Division	17	0	7	0	—		2	0	26	0
Dundalk (loan)	2024	LOI Premier Division	6	0	1	0	—		—		7	0
Ebbsfleet United (loan)	2024–25	National League	1	0	—		1	0	—		2	0
Career total			58	0	11	0	1	0	4	0	74	0
