= Moussa Baradji =

French footballer

Personal information
- Full name: Moussa Baradji
- Date of birth: 20 November 2000 (age 26)
- Place of birth: France
- Height: 1.82 m (6 ft 0 in)
- Position: Central midfielder

Team information
- Current team: Blackburn Rovers
- Number: 24

Youth career
- 2009–2013: ALJ Limay
- 2013–2020: FC Mantois

Senior career*
| Years | Team | Apps | (Gls) |
| 2020–2022 | Team Altamura | 45 | (5) |
| 2022–2024 | Legnago Salus | 46 | (8) |
| 2024–2026 | Yverdon-Sport | 28 | (4) |
| 2025–2026 | → Blackburn Rovers (loan) | 32 | (2) |
| 2026– | Blackburn Rovers | 9 | (0) |
- * Club domestic league appearances and goals as of 14:42, 22 November 2026 (UTC)

Moussa Baradji (born 20 November 2000) is a French professional footballer who plays as a central midfielder for Blackburn Rovers.

== Career ==
=== Early career ===
Baradji started his career in France with ALJ Limay and FC Mantois. He signed for Italian club Team Altamura in October 2020, moving to Legnago Salus in August 2022. He signed with Swiss club Yverdon-Sport in July 2024.

=== Blackburn Rovers ===
He signed on loan for English club Blackburn Rovers in August 2025, having originally failed a medical the previous month from a pre-existing injury Baradji underwent surgery in September 2025 and returned to fitness in November.

He made his Blackburn debut on 21 November, coming on as a late substitute in a 2–1 league win away to Preston North End. Baradji scored his first goals for the club on 4 January 2026, scoring twice in a 2–2 draw with Charlton Athletic.

On 19 May 2026, Blackburn Rovers announced that they had exercised their option to sign Baradji on a permanent basis, signing a long-term contract with the club.

== Personal life ==
Born in France, Baradji is of Malian descent.
