= Tom Atcheson =

Northern Irish association football player (born 2006)

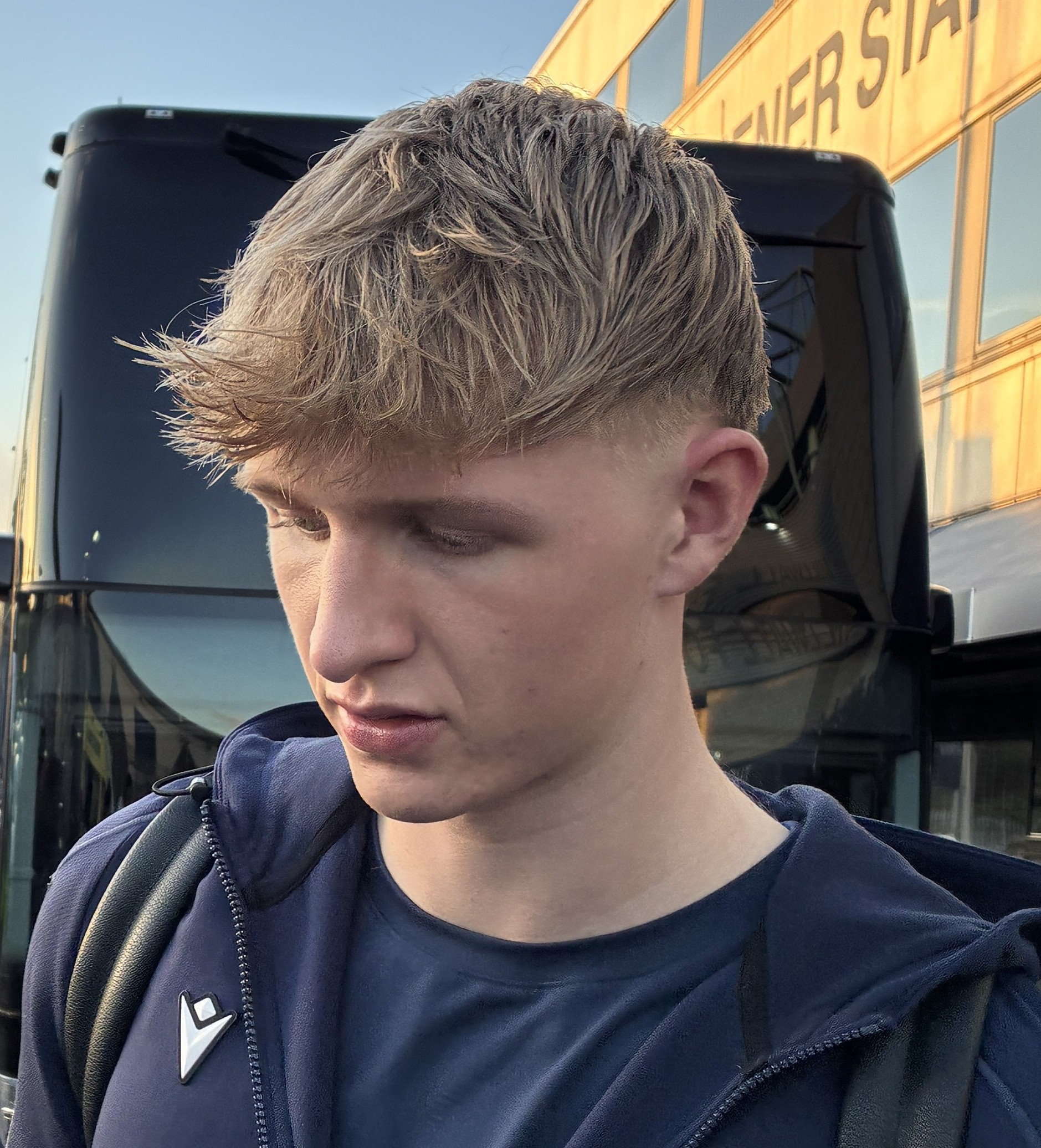
- Atcheson in 2026.

Personal information
- Full name: Tom Joseph Atcheson
- Date of birth: 22 September 2006 (age 20)
- Place of birth: Blackpool, England
- Position: Defender

Team information
- Current team: Blackburn Rovers
- Number: 6

Youth career
- 2017–2023: Blackburn Rovers

Senior career*
Years	Team	Apps	(Gls)
2023–	Blackburn Rovers	23	(0)
2024	→ Marine (loan)	14	(0)

International career^{‡}
2023	Northern Ireland U17	3	(0)
2024	Northern Ireland U18	2	(0)
2023–2024	Northern Ireland U19	8	(0)
2025–	Northern Ireland U21	5	(0)
2026–	Northern Ireland	8	(1)
- * Club domestic league appearances and goals as of 17:13, 17 October 2026 (UTC) ‡ National team caps and goals as of 00:10, 18 November 2026 (UTC)

Tom Joseph Atcheson (born 22 September 2006) is a Northern Irish professional footballer who plays as a defender for EFL Championship club Blackburn Rovers and the Northern Ireland national team.

== Club career ==
Atcheson was born in Blackpool, England and attended Rossall School in nearby Fleetwood. He joined Blackburn Rovers at under-12 level. He made his senior debut in the EFL Cup against Harrogate Town and also featured for the club in the FA Cup against Wrexham during the 2023–24 season. On 29 February 2023, he signed his first professional contract with Blackburn until 2026.

He spent time on loan at Marine during the 2024–25 season. In November 2024, he signed a new four-year contract with Blackburn.

On 20 December 2025, he debuted in the EFL Championship with Blackburn in a 2–0 win over Millwall.

== International career ==
A Northern Ireland youth international, qualifying through his grandparents, he featured for Northern Ireland U19 at the European U19 Championships in 2024.

Atcheson earned his first senior call-up to the Northern Ireland national team as an injury replacement for Daniel Ballard, with his Blackburn Rovers manager Michael O'Neill selecting him ahead of the 2026 FIFA World Cup play-off against Italy. He made his senior debut on 31 March 2026 as an 80th minute substitute in a 1–1 friendly draw with Wales at Cardiff City Stadium.

Atcheson made his full debut in a friendly match against Guinea on 4 June 2026, scoring his first senior goal in the match to help secure a 1–0 victory. He was later sent off in the second half after receiving a straight red card.

== Career statistics ==
=== Club ===
As of match played 17 October 2026

Appearances and goals by club, season and competition
Club	Season	League			National cup		League Cup		Other		Total	
Club	Season	Division	Apps	Goals	Apps	Goals	Apps	Goals	Apps	Goals	Apps	Goals
Blackburn Rovers	2023–24	Championship	0	0	1	0	1	0	0	0	2	0
Blackburn Rovers	2024–25	Championship	0	0	0	0	0	0	0	0	0	0
Blackburn Rovers	2025–26	Championship	14	0	1	0	0	0	0	0	15	0
Blackburn Rovers	2026–27	Championship	9	0	0	0	1	0	—		10	0
Blackburn Rovers	Total		23	0	2	0	2	0	0	0	27	0
Marine (loan)	2024–25	National League North	14	0	1 (Note: Marine's statistics record Atcheson as making 15 appearances, while Opta records 14 league appearances but omits his appearance in the FA Cup tie against Stockton Town on 14 September 2024.)	0	—		—		15	0
Career total			37	0	3	0	2	0	0	0	42	0

=== International ===
As of match played 17 November 2026

Appearances and goals by national team and year
National team	Year	Apps	Goals
Northern Ireland	2026	8	1
Total		8	1

List of international goals scored by Tom Atcheson
No.	Date	Venue	Opponent	Score	Result	Competition
1	4 June 2026	Estadio Municipal de La Línea de la Concepción, La Línea de la Concepción, Spain	Guinea	1–0	1–0	Friendly
