= Paul Gray (footballer) =

Northern Irish footballer

Personal information
- Full name: Robert Paul Gray
- Date of birth: 28 January 1970 (age 56)
- Place of birth: Portsmouth, England
- Height: 5 ft 10 in (1.78 m)
- Position: Forward

Team information
- Current team: Blackburn Rovers (Head of Academy)

Youth career
- Bangor

Senior career*
Years	Team	Apps	(Gls)
1985–1986	Bangor	19	(3)
1986–1991	Luton Town	7	(2)
1991–1992	Wigan Athletic	5	(0)
1993–1996	Bangor	19	(1)
1996–1997	Ards	3	(0)
Total		53	(5)

International career
1990	Northern Ireland U21	1	(1)
- * Club domestic league appearances and goals

Robert Paul Gray (born 28 January 1970 in Portsmouth) is a Northern Irish former footballer who played as a forward.

== Club career ==
Gray started his career in Northern Ireland with Bangor, and was still a teenager when he began playing for the first-team before moving to Luton Town in 1986. He rose through the youth ranks at the club, eventually signing professional terms in 1988. He made his first-team debut in December 1989 against Arsenal. He made six further appearances during the 1989–90 season, but did not feature the following season, and was sold to Wigan Athletic. He made his debut for the Latics in August 1991 against Shrewsbury Town. Gray appeared five times in the first-team before suffering a serious ankle injury against Sheffield United which ended his professional career. He returned to Bangor in 1993, and played out the rest of his career in Northern Ireland.

== International career ==
Although Gray was born in England, he grew up in Northern Ireland and represented the country at youth level. His only under-21 cap came as a substitute against Israel in 1990.
