= Paul Butler (football coach) =

English football coach

Paul Butler (born 1985/1986) is an English football coach.

== Coaching career ==
After enrolling as a Sport and Exercise Science degree student at Manchester Metropolitan University, Butler completed work placements at Manchester City and Middlesbrough before spending time at the Australian Institute of Sport and then undertaking a season-long internship as fitness coach for Premier League side Fulham as part of Roy Hodgson's coaching staff.

In June 2010, he joined Oldham Athletic as part of Paul Dickov's managerial team with the role of Head of Sports Science as well as working as Fitness Coach. On 31 December 2012, Butler was placed on 'gardening leave' by the club alongside coaches Gerry Taggart and Lee Duxbury.

After leaving Oldham, Butler became part of Paul Ince's coaching staff at Blackpool in the Championship. He left the club in June 2013 upon the expiry of his contract. He linked up with Paul Dickov again on 28 June 2013 when he was named as First Team Coach of Championship side Doncaster Rovers, continuing to work at Doncaster after the dismissal of Dickov in September 2015, working alongside new manager Darren Ferguson. Butler left Doncaster and joined fellow Championship side Derby County's coaching staff under Steve McClaren.

On 9 July 2017, Butler joined Leeds United as First Team Coach as part of Thomas Christiansen's backroom staff. Leeds officially announced Butler on 20 July and that his role was that of Assistant Head Coach. Butler left the club when Christiansen was dismissed on 4 February 2018, after a poor run of results and with the team tenth in the table.

He was appointed as a coach at ADO Den Haag in January 2020 following the appointment of Alan Pardew as manager, leaving in April when Pardew departed the club.

Butler re-joined Oldham in early 2021 supporting Harry Kewell as manager. After Kewell's departure, he became assistant to new head coach Keith Curle.

He then linked up with Kewell again when he was appointed First Team Coach at Barnet in July 2021. Butler left the club when Kewell was sacked after failing to win any of his first seven games.

On 19 November 2023, Butler joined the staff of Blackburn Rovers as assistant coach to the under-21s.
