= Jack Barrett (footballer, born 2002) =

English footballer

Personal information
- Full name: Jack Joseph Barrett
- Date of birth: 4 June 2002 (age 24)
- Place of birth: Sefton, England
- Height: 1.91 m (6 ft 3 in)
- Position: Goalkeeper

Team information
- Current team: Blackburn Rovers
- Number: 34

Youth career
- 2011–2024: Everton

Senior career*
Years	Team	Apps	(Gls)
2024	Everton	0	(0)
2024	→ Cavalry FC (loan)	1	(0)
2024–	Blackburn Rovers	0	(0)
2025	→ Workington (loan)	8	(0)
2025–2026	→ Tranmere Rovers (loan)	4	(0)
2026	→ Marine (loan)	3	(0)
- * Club domestic league appearances and goals as of 21:43, 17 November 2026 (UTC)

Jack Joseph Barrett (born 4 June 2002) is an English football player who plays as a goalkeeper for EFL Championship club Blackburn Rovers.

== Early life ==
Barrett joined the Everton Academy at age nine. He signed multiple extensions with the club, while progressing through the youth system. He made his debut with the U21 squad in the Premier League 2 during the 2021–22 season.

== Club career ==
In February 2024, Everton sent Barrett on loan to Canadian Premier League squad Cavalry FC. He made his professional debut on 11 May 2024 against the HFX Wanderers.

In July 2024, Barrett joined Championship side Blackburn Rovers on an initial one-year deal with the option for a further season, having impressed the club's management team whilst on trial. In February 2025, Barrett joined Workington in the Northern Premier League Premier Division, on loan until the end of the season.

In September 2025, Barrett joined Tranmere Rovers in League Two on loan until January. Having made his league debut on 1 January in a 2–0 victory over Harrogate Town, his loan was extended until the end of the season the following day.

In August 2026, Barrett joined Marine on loan for the season.

== Career statistics ==
As of match played 1 January 2026

Appearances and goals by club, season and competition
Club	Season	League			Domestic cup		League cup		Other		Total	
Club	Season	Division	Apps	Goals	Apps	Goals	Apps	Goals	Apps	Goals	Apps	Goals
Everton U21	2021–22	—			—		—		1 (Note: Appearance(s) in EFL Trophy)	0	1	0
Cavalry FC (loan)	2024	Canadian Premier League	1	0	0	0	—		0	0	1	0
Blackburn Rovers	2024–25	Championship	0	0	0	0	0	0	—		0	0
Blackburn Rovers	2025–26	Championship	0	0	0	0	0	0	—		0	0
Blackburn Rovers	Total		0	0	0	0	0	0	0	0	0	0
Workington (loan)	2024–25	Northern Premier League Premier Division	7	0	0	0	—		0	0	7	0
Tranmere Rovers (loan)	2025–26	League Two	1	0	1	0	0	0	4	0	6	0
Career total			9	0	1	0	0	0	5	0	15	0
