= Blackburn Rovers F.C. =

Association football club in England

Coordinates: 53°43′43″N 2°29′21″W

Blackburn Rovers
- Full name: Blackburn Rovers Football Club
- Nicknames: Rovers; The Blue and Whites; The Riversiders
- Founded: 5 November 1875; 151 years ago
- Ground: Ewood Park
- Capacity: 31,367
- Owner: Venkys London Ltd. (99.9%)
- CEO: Steve Curwood
- Head coach: Vacant
- League: EFL Championship
- 2025–26: EFL Championship, 20th of 24
- Website: rovers.co.uk
Home colours	Away colours	Third colours

Blackburn Rovers Football Club is a professional football club based in Blackburn, Lancashire, England, which competes in the EFL Championship, the second level of the English football league system. They have played home matches at Ewood Park since 1890. The club's motto is Arte et Labore, meaning "By Skill and Hard Work" in Latin. They have a long-standing rivalry with nearby club Burnley, with whom they contest the East Lancashire derby.

Blackburn Rovers was founded in 1875, becoming a founding member of The Football League in 1888. They won five FA Cup finals in the 19th century: 1884, 1885, 1886, 1890 and 1891. The team was crowned English League champions in 1911–12 and 1913–14, then won a sixth FA Cup in 1928. They were relegated for the first time in 1936, but returned to the top-flight as Second Division champions in 1938–39. Relegated in 1948, Rovers secured promotion again in 1957–58, but were relegated in 1966 and again in 1971. Blackburn won the Third Division title in 1974–75, and were again promoted in 1979–80 after suffering relegation the previous year. They won the Full Members' Cup in 1987.

In 1992, Rovers gained promotion to the new Premier League via the play-offs, a year after being taken over by local entrepreneur Jack Walker, who installed Kenny Dalglish as manager. In 1994–95, Rovers became Premier League champions. Relegated four seasons after being crowned champions, they secured promotion in 2001, and won the Football League Cup Final the following year. They spent eleven successive seasons in the Premier League, but were relegated in 2012 and again into the third tier in 2017. Blackburn secured promotion out of League One at the end of the 2017–18 season.

== History ==
=== Early years ===
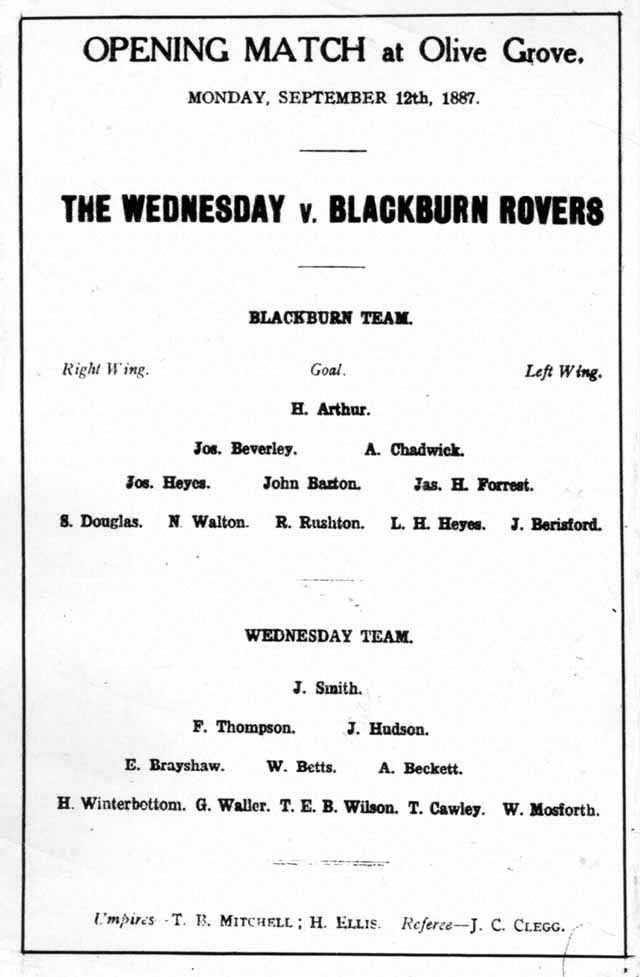
Leaflet advertising a Blackburn Rovers match on 12 September 1887 against 'The Wednesday' at Olive Grove.

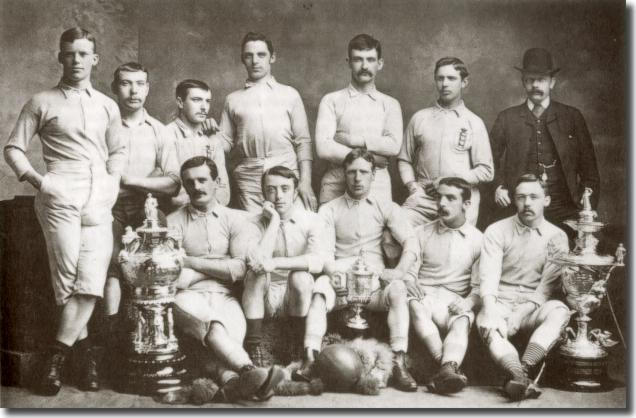
Blackburn Rovers cup winners in 1883–84. The first FA Cup win for the team. The photograph includes the East Lancashire Charity Cup; the FA Cup and the Lancashire Cup. Back row (left to right): J. M. Lofthouse, H. McIntrye, J. Beverly, Kurt Edwards, F. Suter, J. Forrest, R. Birtwistle (umpire) Front row (left to right): J. Douglas, J. E. Sowerbutts, J. Brown, G. Avery, J. Hargreaves.

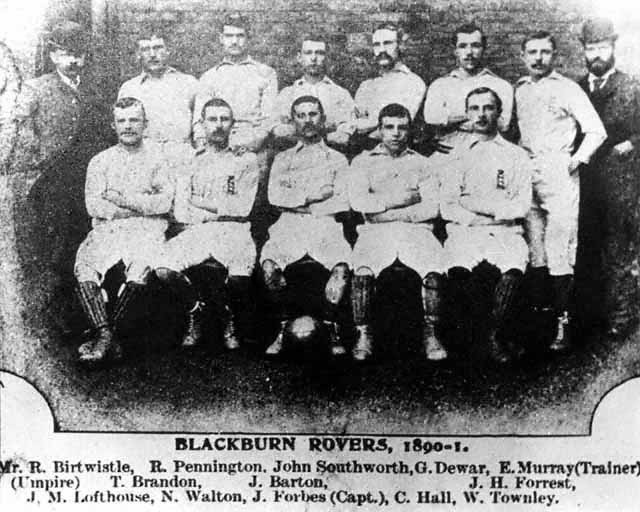
FA Cup winning side of the 1890–91 season

The club was founded following a meeting, at the Leger Hotel, Blackburn, on 5 November 1875. The meeting was organised by two young men, namely John Lewis and Arthur Constantine, two old-boys of Shrewsbury School. The purpose of the meeting was "to discuss the possibility of forming a football club to play under Association rules". The first match played by Blackburn Rovers took place in Church, Lancashire on 18 December 1875 and was a 1–1 draw.

On 28 September 1878, Blackburn Rovers became one of 23 clubs to form the Lancashire Football Association. On 1 November 1879 the club played in the FA Cup for the first time, beating the Tyne Association Football Club 5–1. Rovers were eventually put out of the competition in the third round after suffering a heavy 6–0 defeat by Nottingham Forest.

On 25 March 1882 the club won through to the final of the FA Cup against the Old Etonians. Blackburn Rovers was the first provincial team to reach the final, but the result was a 1–0 defeat by the Old Etonians.

Rovers finally won the FA Cup on 29 March 1884 with a 2–1 victory over the Scottish team Queen's Park. The same teams played the FA Cup final again the next season, with Blackburn Rovers again emerging victorious, with a 2–0 score. Rovers repeated this success yet again the next season, winning the final replay 2–0 against West Bromwich Albion. For this three-in-a-row of FA Cup victories, the club was awarded a specially commissioned silver shield.

The 1885–86 season was the birth of the legal professional footballer, and Blackburn Rovers spent £615 on player wages for the season.

=== Football League commences ===
Blackburn Rovers were founder members of the Football League in 1888. Their first ever league match was played on 15 September 1888 against Accrington, in which they were held to a 5–5 draw. Blackburn Rovers eventually finished 4th in the inaugural Football League table. The following season they finished 3rd winning 12 of their 22 matches and scoring more goals than any other club in the competition, including home victories of 7–0 against Aston Villa and 7–1 against Burnley in October, a 9–1 thrashing of Notts County in November, 7–1 against Bolton in December, and an 8–0 win over Stoke in January.

Blackburn Rovers again reached the FA Cup final on 29 March 1890 at the Kennington Oval. The club claimed the trophy for the fourth time, by beating Sheffield Wednesday a hefty 6–1 with left forward William Townley scoring three goals and becoming the first player to achieve a hat-trick in the FA Cup final.

The 1890–91 season saw Blackburn Rovers win the FA Cup for the fifth time against Notts County with a 3–1 victory. During the 1897–98 season the club were relegated but were elected back into the first division at the Football League's AGM along with Newcastle United. The season marked the beginning of Bob Crompton's 45-year association with the club, as a player and later an FA Cup-winning manager.

=== Early 20th century ===
Blackburn Rovers continued to struggle during the early years of the 20th century, but the results began a gradual improvement. Major renovations were made to Ewood Park: in 1905 the Darwen End was covered at a cost of £1680 and the new Nuttall Stand was opened on New Year's Day 1907. During the first three decades of the 20th century, Blackburn Rovers were still considered a top side in the English league. They were First Division champions in 1911–12 and 1913–14, and F.A Cup winners in 1927–28 with a 3–1 victory against Huddersfield Town, but the F.A Cup win was their last major trophy for nearly 70 years.

=== Mid 20th century ===
Chart showing the progress of Blackburn Rovers F.C. through the English football league system from the inaugural season in 1888–89 to present

Blackburn Rovers maintained a respectable mid-table position in the First Division until they were finally relegated (along with Aston Villa) from the top flight (for the first time since the foundation of the league) in the 1935–36 season.

When the league resumed after the war, Blackburn Rovers were relegated in their second season (1947–48). At this time the tradition of burying a coffin began. The club remained in the second division for the following ten years. After promotion in 1958, they again returned to the mid-table position they had occupied in the earlier part of the century. During this time, they seldom made a serious challenge for a major trophy – although they did reach the 1960 FA Cup Final when managed by Scot Dally Duncan. Rovers lost this game 3–0 to Wolverhampton Wanderers after playing most of the game with only 10 men on the field following an injury to Dave Whelan, who broke a leg.

There were brief hopes of a return to glory in the 1963–64 season, when a remarkable 8–2 away win over West Ham United in east London on Boxing Day took them to the top of the league. Their lead of the league was short-lived, and they finished the season some way down the table, as the title was seized by a Liverpool side who would record a further 12 league titles over the next 26 years, while Blackburn's fortunes took a very different route. They were relegated from the First Division in 1966 and began a 26-year exile from the top division.

=== 1970s and 1980s ===
During the 1970s, Blackburn Rovers bounced between the Second and Third Divisions, winning the Third Division title in 1975, but never mounted a challenge for promotion to the First Division despite the efforts of successive managers to put the club back on track, and fell back into the Third Division in 1979. They went up as runners-up in the Third Division in 1980 and, save for one season in League One in 2017–18, have remained in the upper two tiers of the English league ever since. A second successive promotion was nearly achieved the following year, but the club missed out on goal difference, and promotion-winning manager Howard Kendall moved to Everton that summer. Kendall's successor, Bobby Saxton only managed mid-table finishes for the next three seasons, then nearly achieved promotion in the 1984–85 season, but a poor finish the following year (just one place above relegation) followed by an abysmal start to the 1986–87 season cost Saxton his job.

Saxton was replaced by Don Mackay, who steered them to a decent finish that season and also victory in the Full Members Cup. In the following three seasons Mackay re-established Rovers as promotion contenders, but they fell just short of promotion each time; the closest they came was in 1988–89 reached the Second Division play-off final in its last season of the home-away two-legged format – but lost to Crystal Palace. A defeat in the 1989–90 Second Division playoff semi-finals brought more frustration to Ewood Park, but the following season saw the club taken over by local steelworks owner and lifelong supporter Jack Walker (1929–2000).

=== 1990s ===
Following the Walker takeover Rovers finished 19th in the Second Division at the end of the 1990–91 season, but the new owner had made millions of pounds available to spend on new players and appointed Kenny Dalglish as manager in October 1991. Rovers secured promotion to the new FA Premier League at the end of 1991–92 season as play-off winners, ending 26 years outside the top flight.

Rovers made headlines in the summer of 1992 by paying an English record fee of £3.5million for the 22-year-old Southampton and England centre forward Alan Shearer. After finishing fourth in 1992–93 and runners-up in 1993–94, they went on to win the Premier League title in 1994–95. The title chase went down to the last game of the season, but despite Rovers losing to Liverpool at Anfield they edged out rivals Manchester United to win the championship.

Kenny Dalglish moved upstairs to the position of Director of Football at the end of the Premier League winning season, and handed over the reins to his assistant Ray Harford. Blackburn Rovers made a poor start to the 1995–96 season, and found themselves in the bottom half for most of the first half of the season. Rovers also struggled in the Champions League and finished bottom of their group with just four points.

A poor start to the 1996–97 Premier League campaign saw Harford resign in late October with the club bottom of the division, having failed to win any of their first ten games. Relegation looked a real possibility, just two seasons after winning the league. After an abortive attempt to bring in Sven-Göran Eriksson as manager, long-serving coach Tony Parkes took over as manager for the rest of the campaign, narrowly steering the side to survival. That summer, the manager's job was taken by Roy Hodgson, who joined the club from Internazionale. UEFA Cup football was secured with a 6th-place finish. Rovers made a poor start to the 1998–99 campaign and Hodgson was sacked in December less than an hour after a 2–0 home defeat by bottom side Southampton, a result that locked Rovers in the relegation zone. He was replaced as manager by Brian Kidd. Kidd failed to save Rovers from relegation.

=== 2000s ===
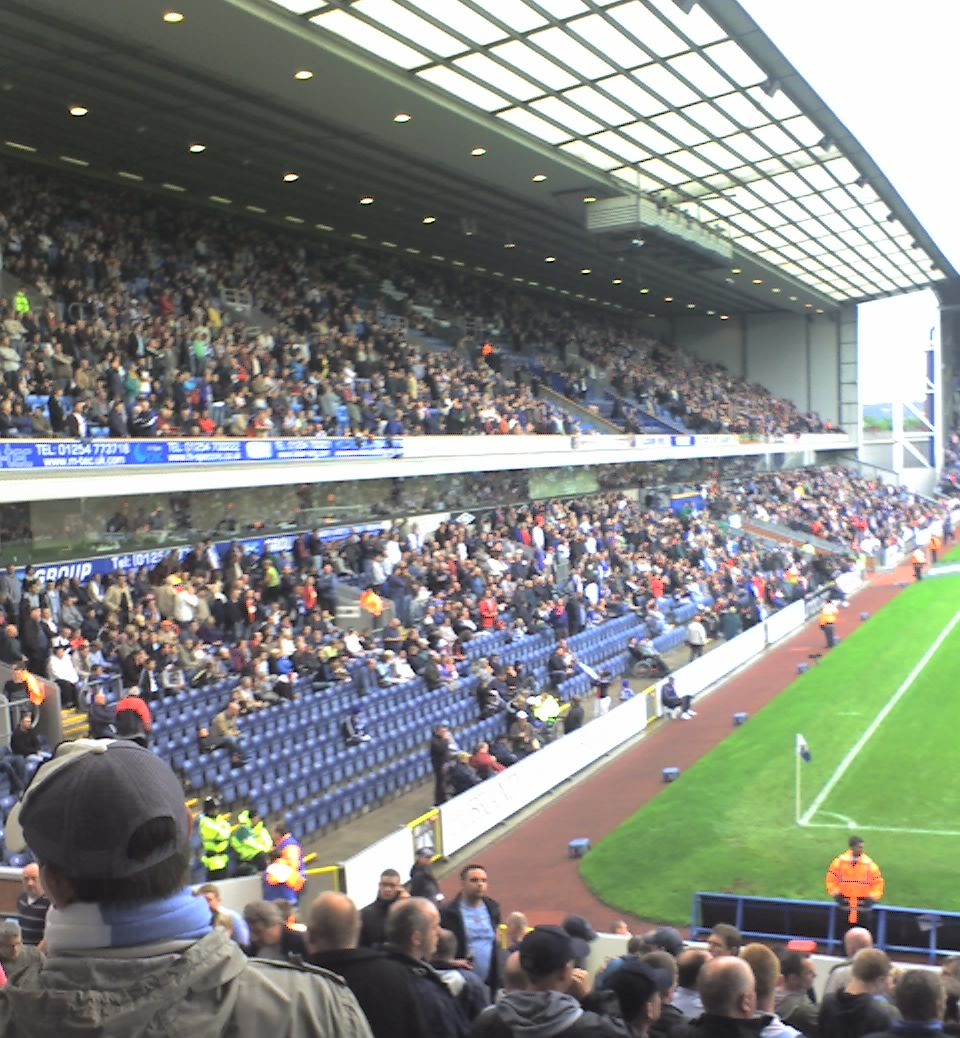
The Jack Walker Stand during a match on 2 September 2007 (Blackburn 1-0 Manchester City)

In 1999–2000 Rovers began the season as promotion favourites, but with the club hovering just above the Division One relegation zone Brian Kidd was sacked in October and replaced in March by Graeme Souness. Jack Walker died just after the start of the 2000–01 season, and the club dedicated its promotion challenge in memory of their benefactor. Fittingly, they returned to the Premier League after a much improved season, finishing second behind Fulham.

In 2001–02, record signing Andy Cole was bought in for £8million, and Rovers won their first-ever League Cup by beating Tottenham Hotspur 2–1 at the Millennium Stadium in Cardiff, Cole scoring the winner in the 69th minute. The following season Rovers finished sixth to qualify for the UEFA Cup for the second season running. Souness left just after the start of 2004–05 to take charge at Newcastle, and he was replaced by Welsh national coach Mark Hughes. Hughes secured Rovers' Premier League survival for the 2004–05 season as well as an FA Cup semi-final against Arsenal, with Rovers finishing 15th once again. He led the team to sixth the following season and Rovers's third European qualification in five years.

Rovers reached the semi-final of the 2006–07 FA Cup, but lost to Chelsea in extra time, and finished that season's league in tenth, qualifying for the Intertoto Cup, which led to a short run in the 2007–08 UEFA Cup. In May 2008, Mark Hughes left Blackburn Rovers for the vacancy at Manchester City. He was replaced by Paul Ince, whose first job was to persuade some of the wantaway players to stay. with Archie Knox coming in as his assistant. Ince's time in charge started well, but following a run of eleven games without a win he was sacked in December 2008. Sam Allardyce was appointed as Ince's replacement and in 2009–10 he led the team to a tenth-place finish and a League Cup semi-final.

=== 2010 onwards ===
In November 2010, the Indian company V H Group bought Blackburn Rovers under the name of Venky's London Limited for £23 million. The new owners immediately sacked manager Sam Allardyce and replaced him with first-team coach Steve Kean, initially on a temporary basis, but by January 2011 he had been awarded a full-time contract until June 2013. Kean's appointment was shrouded in controversy since his agent Jerome Anderson had earlier played a major role in advising Venky's during the takeover of the club in the preceding months.

In December 2011, Blackburn Rovers posted an annual pre-tax loss of £18.6m for the year ending 30 June 2011. Despite this, the owners of Blackburn Rovers provided assurances over the continued funding of the club, even if they were relegated.

On 7 May 2012, Blackburn were relegated to the Championship after being defeated at home by Wigan Athletic in the penultimate game of the season, ending eleven years in the Premier League. At the start of the 2012–2013 season, Kean was given a chance by the owners to win promotion and kept his job as the manager. Ultimately though, pressure from the supporters who had been calling for the manager's removal for months resulted in his resignation as manager on 29 September 2012.

On 7 May 2017, Blackburn were relegated to League One. On 24 April 2018, the club were promoted back to the second tier with a 1–0 win at Doncaster Rovers.

In recent years, they have finished 15th (2018–2019), 11th (2019–2020), 15th (2020–2021), 8th (2021–2022), and 7th (2022–2023) in the Championship.

In the 2023–2024 season, Blackburn narrowly avoided relegation on the final matchday, finishing in 19th place after a 2–0 win against title winners Leicester City, their lowest finish since their promotion back to the Championship in 2018.

== Players ==
=== Current squad ===
As of 2 October 2026

Note: Flags indicate national team as defined under FIFA eligibility rules; some limited exceptions apply. Players may hold more than one non-FIFA nationality.

No.	Pos.	Nation	Player
1	GK	ENG	Aynsley Pears
2	DF	NGR	Ryan Alebiosu
3	DF	ENG	Harry Pickering
4	DF	POR	Yuri Ribeiro
6	DF	NIR	Tom Atcheson
7	FW	SLE	Augustus Kargbo
8	MF	EGY	Sam Morsy
9	FW	ISL	Andri Guðjohnsen
10	MF	ENG	Todd Cantwell (captain)
11	MF	ENG	Jayden Fevrier
14	MF	BEL	Dion De Neve
15	DF	IRL	Sean McLoughlin
16	DF	ENG	Scott Wharton
17	DF	ENG	Hayden Carter

No.	Pos.	Nation	Player
21	FW	ENG	Dapo Afolayan
22	GK	HUN	Balázs Tóth
23	FW	JPN	Yūki Ōhashi
24	MF	FRA	Moussa Baradji
25	MF	JPN	Ryōya Morishita
27	DF	FRA	Gady Beyuku
28	MF	ENG	Adam Forshaw
29	FW	DEN	Mathias Jørgensen
30	MF	ENG	Jake Garrett
31	MF	SCO	Kristi Montgomery
33	DF	AUS	Lewis Miller
34	GK	ENG	Jack Barrett
40	DF	ENG	Matty Litherland
45	FW	ENG	Harvey Higgins

==== Out on loan ====
Note: Flags indicate national team as defined under FIFA eligibility rules; some limited exceptions apply. Players may hold more than one non-FIFA nationality.

No.	Pos.	Nation	Player
5	MF	POR	Sidnei Tavares (at Wisła Płock until 30 June 2027)
18	MF	SWE	Axel Henriksson (at Randers until 30 June 2027)
26	DF	IRL	Connor O'Riordan (at Barnsley until 30 June 2027)

No.	Pos.	Nation	Player
35	GK	ENG	Nicholas Michalski (at Crawley Town until 30 June 2027)
43	DF	ENG	George Pratt (at Bradford City until 30 June 2027)

For recent transfers, see 2026–27 Blackburn Rovers F.C. season.

=== Development/Academy squad ===
Players with at least one first-team appearance for Blackburn Rovers.

Note: Flags indicate national team as defined under FIFA eligibility rules; some limited exceptions apply. Players may hold more than one non-FIFA nationality.

No.	Pos.	Nation	Player
36	MF	ENG	James Edmondson
37	GK	ENG	Felix Goddard
39	DF	ENG	Harvey Pates

No.	Pos.	Nation	Player
47	DF	ENG	Lucas Houghton
48	MF	ENG	Isaac Dunn
53	MF	ENG	Frank Vare

=== Notable players ===
For a list of notable Blackburn Rovers players in sortable-table format see List of Blackburn Rovers F.C. players.

== Staff ==
=== Footballing staff ===
As of 17 November 2026

Senior football
Head of Football Operations	(Benin) Rudy Gestede
Head of Technical Development	(Wales) Adam Owen
Head Coach	(England) Vacant
Assistant Head Coach	(England) Mike Dodds
Assistant Head Coach & Head of Player Development	(Northern Ireland) Damien Johnson
Goalkeeping Coach	(England) Gareth Stewart
Loan Manager	(Scotland) Jordan Rhodes
Academy
Head of Academy	(Northern Ireland) Paul Gray
Head of Academy Coaching	(England) John Prince
Under-21s Lead Coach	(England) Paul Butler
Under-18s Lead Coach	(England) Dan Stubberfield
Head of Academy Recruitment	(England) Michael Cribley
Medical & Performance
Head of Performance	(Spain) Nacho Sancho
Consultant	(England) Chris Dalton
Head of Physiotherapy	(England) Wayne Gill
Consultant	(England) Dave Fevre
Head of Academy Sports Science and Medical	(England) Rob Pulling

=== Senior management ===
As of 13 February 2026

Board
Chief Executive Officer	(England) Steve Curwood
Chief Operating Officer	(India) Suhail Shaikh
Director	(India) Gandhi Babu
Director	(India) Mr. M Sreenivasa Rao
Non-Executive Director	(England) Robert Coar
Chief Financial Officer	(England) Matt Wright

=== Club operations ===
As of 13 February 2026

Club staff
Head of Football Administration	Brett Baker
Head of Operations	Lynsey Talbot
Head of HR & Safeguarding	Faye Billington
Head of IT	Kieran Shellard
Head of Media & Communications	Rob Gill
Head of Commercial and Partnerships	Yasir Sufi
Head of Marketing	Anna Melia
Head of Community Trust/CEO	Gary Robinson

== Awards ==
=== Player of the season ===
Year	Winner
1980–81	(England) Mick Speight
1981–82	(England) Mick Rathbone
1982–83	(England) Derek Fazackerley
1983–84	(England) Simon Garner
1984–85	(England) Terry Gennoe
1985–86	(England) Simon Barker
1986–87	(England) David Mail
1987–88	(Scotland) Colin Hendry
1988–89	(England) Howard Gayle
1989–90	(England) Scott Sellars

Year	Winner
1990–91	(Republic of Ireland) Kevin Moran
1991–92	(Scotland) David Speedie
1992–93	(Scotland) Colin Hendry
1993–94	(England) David Batty
1994–95	(England) Alan Shearer
1995–96	(England) Alan Shearer
1996–97	(Scotland) Colin Hendry
1997–98	(England) Chris Sutton
1998–99	(Australia) John Filan
1999–2000	(Republic of Ireland) Damien Duff

Year	Winner
2000–01	(England) Matt Jansen
2001–02	(Republic of Ireland) Damien Duff
2002–03	(United States) Brad Friedel
2003–04	(Turkey) Tugay Kerimoğlu
2004–05	(England) Andy Todd
2005–06	(Wales) Craig Bellamy
2006–07	(England) David Bentley
2007–08	(Paraguay) Roque Santa Cruz
2008–09	(England) Stephen Warnock
2009–10	(France) Steven Nzonzi

Year	Winner
2010–11	(England) Paul Robinson
2011–12	(Nigeria) Yakubu
2012–13	(Scotland) Jordan Rhodes
2013–14	(Scotland) Tom Cairney
2014–15	(Sweden) Marcus Olsson
2015–16	(Scotland) Grant Hanley
2016–17	(Republic of Ireland) Derrick Williams
2017–18	(England) Bradley Dack
2018–19	(England) Danny Graham
2019–20	(England) Adam Armstrong

Year	Winner
2020–21	(Belgium) Thomas Kaminski
2021–22	(Netherlands) Jan Paul van Hecke
2022–23	(Scotland) Dominic Hyam
2023–24	(Republic of Ireland) Sammie Szmodics
2024–25	(Norway) Sondre Tronstad
2025–26	(Japan) Ryōya Morishita

=== European football ===
Blackburn Rovers in Europe
Season	Competition	Round	Country	Club	Home	Away	Aggregate
1994–95	UEFA Cup	First round	(Sweden)	Trelleborg	0–1	2–2	2–3
1995–96	UEFA Champions League	Group B	(Russia)	Spartak Moscow	0–1	0–3	4th
1995–96	UEFA Champions League	Group B	(Poland)	Legia Warsaw	0–0	0–1	4th
1995–96	UEFA Champions League	Group B	(Norway)	Rosenborg	4–1	1–2	4th
1998–99	UEFA Cup	First round	(France)	Lyon	0–1	2–2	2–3
2002–03	UEFA Cup	First round	(Bulgaria)	CSKA Sofia	1–1	3–3	4–4 (a)
2002–03	UEFA Cup	Second round	(Scotland)	Celtic	0–2	0–1	0–3
2003–04	UEFA Cup	First round	(Turkey)	Gençlerbirliği	1–1	1–3	2–4
2006–07	UEFA Cup	First round	(Austria)	Red Bull Salzburg	2–0	2–2	4–2
2006–07	UEFA Cup	Group E	(France)	Nancy	1–0	—N/a	1st
2006–07	UEFA Cup	Group E	(Netherlands)	Feyenoord	—N/a	0–0	1st
2006–07	UEFA Cup	Group E	(Poland)	Wisła Kraków	—N/a	2–1	1st
2006–07	UEFA Cup	Group E	(Switzerland)	Basel	3–0	—N/a	1st
2006–07	UEFA Cup	Round of 32	(Germany)	Bayer Leverkusen	0–0	2–3	2–3
2007–08	UEFA Intertoto Cup	Third round	(Lithuania)	Vėtra	4–0	2–0	6–0
2007–08	UEFA Cup	Second qualifying round	(Finland)	MyPa	2–0	1–0	3–0
2007–08	UEFA Cup	First round	(Greece)	AEL	2–1	0–2	2–3

== Colours ==
Unlike most teams, Blackburn Rovers have only ever had one design to their home kit. The distinctive blue and white halved jersey is widely acknowledged as the "town colour". Although the design has remained the same, the side in which the colours fall has often changed. Blue has resided on the wearers left since 1946; prior to this, the blue and white often switched order almost yearly.

Photographic evidence from 1878 shows the team in Blue and white halved (quartered) jerseys, white shorts and blue socks, complete with blue and white cap and Maltese Cross.

== Badge ==
Through its history the club has adopted four badges as its crest; the Maltese Cross, the towns coat of arms, Lancashire Rose and the present day Blackburn Rovers Badge. From 1875 to approximately 1882 the Maltese Cross was present on the club's first ever home kit and was worn by both the Shrewsbury and Malvern school teams. Two former Malvernians and two former Salopians played in that first team, so there is a clear link with these public schools.

During FA Cup finals it is tradition for the club to adopt the town's coat of arms as their badge. This tradition has carried through all eight FA Cup finals the club has been a part of all the way to their last FA Cup final against Wolverhampton Wanderers in 1960.

From roughly 1882 and excluding cup finals the club did not use a badge until 1974. In this year the club opted for an embroidered Lancashire Rose with the club's initials "B.R.F.C." below. This badge lasted for 15 years until it was changed in 1989 due to visibility issues of the dark red rose on the dark blue of the shirt.

From 1989 to the present day the current Blackburn Rovers badge has been used. It has encompassed the previous badge in a newer design for the Lancashire Red Rose. Circling the rose is the team name "Blackburn Rovers F.C." and the date in which the club was founded "1875". At the base of the badge is the club motto, "Arte Et Labore" which translated means, "by skill and by labour". This motto has been taken from the town motto which was adopted in 1852.

== Grounds ==
=== Oozehead Ground 1875–1877 ===
Rovers first home ground was a field at Oozehead on Preston New Road to the north west of the town. This field was farmland and was owned by a local farmer; when Blackburn Rovers weren't using the field it was used to graze cows. In the centre of the field was a large watering hole, which on match days was covered with timber and turf.

=== Pleasington Cricket Ground 1877 ===
Due to the rough conditions at Oozehead, the committee felt an established sports ground would be best to play on. Therefore, during the 1877 season they acquired the use of Pleasington's cricket ground to the south west of the town. Play stopped on this ground after Henry Smith of Preston North End died of a heart attack whilst playing.

=== Alexandra Meadows 1877–1881 ===
Still adopting cricket grounds, the committee acquired the use of the East Lancashire Cricket Club's ground in the centre of the town, Alexandra Meadows. Sources differ as to the date of the first match played by Rovers at Alexandra Meadows. A programme from Clitheroe F.C. states that Clitheroe was the first team to beat Blackburn at Alexandra Meadows on 17 November 1877. Other sources indicate that the first match took place on 2 January 1878 with a Blackburn victory against Partick Thistle. It was on this ground Blackburn Rovers played for the first time under artificial light against Accrington on 4 November 1878.

=== Leamington Road 1881–1890 ===
Due to the increasing demand in football in the area and in particular for Blackburn Rovers the committee felt that a private ground was more fitting. Therefore, in 1881 the club moved to Leamington Road, Blackburn Rovers' first purpose built ground including a 700-person capacity seated grandstand, costing £500. The first game played at this ground was held on 8 October 1881 against Blackburn Olympic resulting in a 4–1 win for Rovers. Whilst at Leamington Road and under James Fielding the club won three FA Cups and was inaugurated into the Football League as a founding Member in 1888. Despite the club's success, they left Leamington Road due to an increase in lease costs.

=== Ewood Park 1890–present ===
Built in April 1882 as Ewood Bridge. The ground was an all purpose sporting venue hosting football, athletics and dog racing. The Blackburn Rovers committee felt this was the ideal venue for the club after having already played numerous games there in 1882. The first game played at the new Ewood Park ground was on 13 September 1890 against Accrington, the 0–0 draw was viewed by 10,000 people and on 31 October 1892 artificial lights were installed. Ewood sits on the bank of the River Darwen in Blackburn, Lancashire.

==== 1913 terrorist incident ====
An attempt was made to destroy the ground in 1913. As part of the suffragette bombing and arson campaign, suffragettes carried out a series of bombings and arson attacks nationwide to publicise their campaign for women's suffrage. In November 1913, suffragettes attempted to burn down Ewood Park's grandstand but were foiled. In the same year, suffragettes succeeded in burning down Arsenal's then South London stadium, and also attempted to burn down Preston North End's ground. More traditionally male sports were targeted in order to protest against male dominance.

== Supporters and rivalries ==
Blackburn Rovers supporters have formed several support clubs related to the team, and almost all of them are partially focused on making trips to Ewood Park easier. Rovers home games were well attended as a percentage of the Blackburn population throughout the 2000s with average attendances of around 25,000, equal to roughly a quarter of Blackburn's population (approximately 100,000). The supporters' long-running fanzine is called 4,000 Holes.

Clement Charnock and his brother Harry were Blackburn Rovers fans who introduced football into Russia in the 1880s.

Blackburn's primary rivals are Burnley, with whom they contest the East Lancashire derby. Other rivalries for Rovers include Manchester United, Preston North End, Bolton Wanderers and Wigan Athletic, all based in North-West England.

== Statistics and records ==
=== Records ===
- Most League appearances:

Derek Fazackerley, 593+3 sub, 1970–71 to 1986–87

- Record goalscorer:

Simon Garner, 194 goals (168 league), 1978–79 to 1991–92

- Record attendance at Ewood Park:

62,255 v Bolton Wanderers, FA Cup 6th round, 2 March 1929

- Transfer fee paid:

£8m to Manchester United for Andy Cole in December 2001
£8m to Huddersfield Town for Jordan Rhodes in August 2012

- Transfer fee received:

Up to £22m from Crystal Palace for Adam Wharton in February 2024.

- Record win:

11–0 v Rossendale United, Ewood Park, FA Cup 1st round 13 October 1884

- Record League win:

9–0 v Middlesbrough, Ewood Park, Division 2, 6 November 1954

- Record away win:

8–2 v West Ham United, Division 1, 26 December 1963

- Record League defeat:

0–8 v Arsenal, Division 1, 25 February 1933, 0–8 v Lincoln City, Division 2, 29 August 1953

- Record home League defeat:

0–7 v Fulham, 3 November 2021.

- Record aggregate League score:

13: 5–8 v Derby County, 6 September 1890

- Most points gained in a season (2pts):

60 (1974–75)

- Most points gained in a season (3pts):

91 (2000–01)

- Fewest points gained in a season (2pts):

20 (1965–66)

- Fewest points gained in a season (3pts):

31 (2011–12)

- Most consecutive League appearances:

Walter Crook, 208 (1934–46)

- Most goals scored by a player in a season:

Ted Harper, 43, Division 1, 1925–26

- Most goals scored by a player in a match:

Tommy Briggs, 7 v Bristol Rovers, Ewood Park, Division 2, 5 February 1955

- Most hat-tricks in a season:

8, 1963–64

- Most individual hat-tricks:

13, Jack Southworth, 1887–1893

- Most FA Cup appearances:

Ronnie Clayton, 56, 1949–1969

- Most League Cup appearances:

Derek Fazackerley, 38, 1969–1987

- Youngest player to appear for Rovers:

Harry Dennison, aged 16 yrs and 155 days against Bristol City, Division 1, 8 April 1911

- Oldest player to appear for Rovers:

Bob Crompton, 40 yrs and 150 days against Bradford City, Division 1, 23 February 1920

- Longest undefeated FA Cup run:

24 games including 3 consecutive FA Cup wins, 1884–86. Still an FA Cup record

Reference for above facts

== Honours ==
League

- First Division / Premier League (level 1)
  - Champions: 1911–12, 1913–14, 1994–95
  - Runners-up: 1993–94
- Second Division / First Division / Championship (level 2)
  - Champions: 1938–39
  - Runners-up: 1957–58, 2000–01
  - Play-off winners: 1992
- Third Division / League One (level 3)
  - Champions: 1974–75
  - Runners-up: 1979–80, 2017–18

Cup

- FA Cup
  - Winners (6): 1883–84, 1884–85, 1885–86, 1889–90, 1890–91, 1927–28
  - Runners-up: 1881–82, 1959–60
- Football League Cup
  - Winners: 2001–02
- FA Charity Shield
  - Winners: 1912
  - Runners-up: 1928, 1994, 1995
- Full Members' Cup
  - Winners: 1986–87
- Football League War Cup
  - Runners-up: 1939–40

Regional

- Lancashire Cup (Note: The club has fielded its reserve team in the competition since the mid-1990s)
  - Winners (20): 1881–82, 1882–83, 1883–84, 1884–85, 1895–96, 1900–01, 1901–02, 1903–04, 1906–07, 1908–09, 1910–11, 1944–45, 1983–84, 1985–86, 1987–88, 1989–90, 2006–07, 2010–11, 2018–19, 2020–21
