= James Edmondson (footballer) =

English association football player (born 2005)

Personal information
- Full name: James Stephen Edmondson
- Date of birth: 1 November 2005 (age 21)
- Place of birth: England
- Position: Midfielder

Team information
- Current team: Blackburn Rovers
- Number: 36

Youth career
- 2012–2023: Blackburn Rovers

Senior career*
Years	Team	Apps	(Gls)
2023–	Blackburn Rovers	0	(0)
2024–2025	→ Macclesfield (loan)	11	(2)
2025–2026	→ Macclesfield (loan)	37	(3)
- * Club domestic league appearances and goals as of 15:58, 3 May 2026 (UTC)

James Stephen Edmondson (born 1 November 2005) is an English professional footballer who plays as a midfielder for EFL Championship club Blackburn Rovers.

== Career ==
=== Blackburn Rovers ===
Edmondson joined the youth academy of Blackburn Rovers at the age of 6, and worked his way up all their youth categories, debuting with their U21s at the age of 15.

On 17 November 2022, he signed his first professional contract with the club until June 2025. He started training with the senior team in the preseason in the summer of 2023.

On 30 August 2023, Edmondson made his professional debut for Rovers in the club's 8–0 EFL Cup win over Harrogate Town at Wetherby Road. Replacing Andrew Moran in the 63rd minute, Edmondson scored the club's 8th goal of the game and the first of his professional career.

==== Macclesfield (loan) ====
On 21 October 2024, Edmondson joined Macclesfield on a short-term loan deal. On 8 January 2025, Edmondson returned to Blackburn Rovers having made 14 appearances, scoring 3 goals in all competitions.

On 4 September 2025, Edmondson returned to National League North side Macclesfield on another short-term loan deal.

Edmondson played the full 90 minutes in a 2–1 victory over FA Cup holders Crystal Palace on 10 January 2026, a result widely described as one of the greatest shocks in FA Cup history, as his side defeated the Premier League opposition. Former Blackburn Rovers academy product Adam Wharton also featured in midfield for Palace.

On 2 February, Edmondson's loan was extended until the end of the 2025–26 season.

== Personal life ==
Edmondson is of American descent through his grandfather from Florida. His brother Stephen also plays in the Blackburn Rovers academy setup.

== Career statistics ==
As of match played 6 September 2025

Appearances and goals by club, season and competition
Club	Season	League			FA Cup		League Cup		Other		Total	
Club	Season	Division	Apps	Goals	Apps	Goals	Apps	Goals	Apps	Goals	Apps	Goals
Blackburn Rovers	2023-24	Championship	0	0	0	0	1	1	—		1	1
Blackburn Rovers	2024-25	Championship	0	0	0	0	0	0	—		0	0
Blackburn Rovers	2025-26	Championship	0	0	0	0	0	0	—		0	0
Blackburn Rovers	Total		0	0	0	0	1	1	—		1	1
Macclesfield (loan)	2025-26	National League North	1	0	0	0	—		2 (Note: Appearance(s) in FA Trophy)	0	3	0
Career total			1	0	0	0	1	1	2	0	4	1
