= Thomas Bloxham =

Thomas Bloxham may refer to:

- Tom Bloxham (property developer) (born 1963), English property developer
- Tom Bloxham (footballer, born 2003), English football striker for Blackpool
- Tom Bloxham (footballer, born 2005), Irish football winger for Blackburn Rovers
