= Zak Gilsenan =

Irish association footballer

Personal information
- Full name: Zak Thomas Gilsenan
- Date of birth: 8 May 2003 (age 23)
- Place of birth: Joondalup, Perth, Australia
- Height: 1.78 m (5 ft 10 in)
- Position: Left winger

Team information
- Current team: FC Halifax Town

Youth career
- Carramar Cougars
- –2012: Sorrento
- 2011–2012: Perth Glory
- 2012–2014: Barcelona
- 2014–2019: Liverpool
- 2019–2023: Blackburn Rovers

Senior career*
Years	Team	Apps	(Gls)
2023–2025	Blackburn Rovers	2	(0)
2025–2026	Grimsby Town	2	(0)
2026	→ Buxton (loan)	8	(3)
2026	→ Gateshead (loan)	6	(0)
2026–	FC Halifax Town	3	(3)

International career^{‡}
- Australia U17
2021	Republic of Ireland U19	1	(1)
2023–2024	Republic of Ireland U21	4	(1)
- * Club domestic league appearances and goals as of 16:14, 6 May 2026 (UTC) ‡ National team caps and goals as of 01:16, 16 October 2024 (UTC)

Zak Thomas Gilsenan (born 8 May 2003) is a professional footballer who plays as a left winger for National League club FC Halifax Town. Born in Australia, he represents the Republic of Ireland at international level.

== Early life ==
Gilsenan was born in Joondalup, Perth to Irish parents from Blanchardstown, and is the youngest of three siblings.

== Club career ==
=== Early career ===
Gilsenan started playing football at a young age, initially playing indoor soccer with local side Carramar Cougars. He trialled unsuccessfully with ECU Joondalup, before joining Sorrento. In 2011, he was scouted and signed by A-League side Perth Glory, where he played in holiday clinics while remaining with Sorrento at the same time. He attended a two-week training camp organised by English club Tottenham Hotspur, where he was named player of the tournament, and was invited to trial with the north-London side. During the trial, he was scouted by Spanish giants Barcelona, and moved to the Catalonian side in 2012.

Despite captaining the Barcelona youth teams, his parents relocated to England after two years in Spain, and Gilsenan again went on trial, this time with Liverpool. He signed for Liverpool in 2014. He suffered a run of injuries, which eventually ended his spell in Merseyside, and despite interest from Premier League sides, he signed for Blackburn Rovers at the age of sixteen.

=== Blackburn Rovers ===
He signed his first professional contract with Blackburn Rovers in May 2021. Later the same year, he suffered an ACL injury, which kept him out until June 2022. Having recovered from his injury and returning to action in October 2022, he established himself as a regular in the club's under-21 squad, and he signed a contract extension in June 2023.

On 8 August 2023, Gilsenan made his professional debut for Blackburn Rovers in their EFL Cup first round 4–3 victory over EFL League Two side Walsall, going on to score his first professional goal in addition to assisting the winning goal. He received the club's Player of the Match award for his debut performance. In the following round, he helped Blackburn Rovers to their biggest ever away win, scoring a free kick as they beat Harrogate Town 8–0.

Having made his league debut against Queens Park Rangers in October 2023, he stated in January 2024 that he was looking to secure a loan move in that month's transfer window. However, during pre-season ahead of the 2024–25 season, Blackburn Rovers manager John Eustace confirmed that Gilsenan had suffered a muscle injury, and would be out for up to eight weeks. In October 2024, having still not recovered from the injury, Gilsenan stated that he would "come back stronger". A scan later revealed that the injury had not improved, and Gilsenan underwent surgery, extending his time out of the first team to a year; from April 2024 to April 2025.

On 19 May 2025, it was announced he will be leaving the club upon the expiration of his current contract.

=== Grimsby Town ===
On 2 July 2025, Gilsenan signed for EFL League Two side Grimsby Town on a two-year contract.

He moved on loan to National League North side Buxton F.C. originally until the end of the 2025–2026 season, however was recalled on March 4, 2026, to join National League team Gateshead on loan until the end of the season.

On 19 May 2026, the club announced that he would leave the club upon expiry of his contract on 30 June 2026.

=== FC Halifax Town ===
On 6 July 2026, Gilsenan signed for National League team FC Halifax Town on a one-year deal with the option of an additional year.

== International career ==
Eligible to represent Australia and the Republic of Ireland, Gilsenan has represented both at international level, before declaring for Ireland in 2021. He scored on his debut for the Republic of Ireland under-19s in a 2–2 draw with Sweden. On 31 August 2023, Gilsenan received his first call up to the Republic of Ireland U21 squad for their 2025 UEFA European Under-21 Championship qualification fixtures against Turkey U21 and San Marino U21 on 8 and 12 September 2023. On 8 September 2023, he made his Republic of Ireland U21 debut, in a 3–2 win over Turkey U21 at Turners Cross, scoring an 87th-minute penalty to put his side level.

== Career statistics ==
As of match played on 2 May 2026

Appearances and goals by club, season and competition
Club	Season	League			FA Cup		EFL Cup		Other		Total	
Club	Season	Division	Apps	Goals	Apps	Goals	Apps	Goals	Apps	Goals	Apps	Goals
Blackburn Rovers	2023–24	Championship	2	0	0	0	3	2	–		5	2
Blackburn Rovers	2024–25	Championship	0	0	0	0	0	0	–		0	0
Blackburn Rovers	Total		2	0	0	0	3	2	–		5	2
Grimsby Town	2025–26	League Two	2	0	1	0	0	0	2 (Note: Appearance(s) in the EFL Trophy)	1	5	1
Buxton (loan)	2025–26	National League North	8	3	0	0	0	0	0	0	8	3
Gateshead (loan)	2025–26	National League	6	0	0	0	0	0	0	0	6	0
FC Halifax Town	2026-27	National League	3	3								
Career total			18	3	1	0	3	2	2	1	24	6
