= 2023–24 Blackburn Rovers F.C. season =

Blackburn Rovers
2023–24 season
- Owner: Venkys London Ltd
- CEO: Steve Waggott
- Head coach: Jon Dahl Tomasson (until 9 February); John Eustace (from 9 February)
- Stadium: Ewood Park
- Championship: 19th
- FA Cup: Fifth round
- EFL Cup: Fourth round
- Top goalscorer: League: Sammie Szmodics (27); All: Sammie Szmodics (33)
Home colours	Away colours	Third colours

The 2023–24 season was the 136th season in the existence of Blackburn Rovers Football Club and the club's sixth consecutive season in the Championship. In addition to the domestic league, they also competed in the FA Cup and the EFL Cup.

== Season summary ==
=== May ===
On 19 May 2023, Rovers confirmed their retained list for the 2023–24 season. The club confirmed Bradley Dack, Ben Brereton Diaz, Daniel Ayala, Danny Butterworth, Dan Pike, Sam Burns, Aidan Dowling, George Chmiel, Will Blease & Ryan Wilson will all leave the club when their contracts end on 30 June. Jared Harlock, Lenni Cirino & Alex Baker have all had their contracts extended by a further 12 months, whilst Zak Gilsenan, Patrick Gamble and Isaac Whitehall have been offered new contracts. The following scholars have also been offered their first professional contracts with the club Dominik Biniek, Adam Caddick, Leo Duru, Ben Fyles and Charlie Olson.

On 22 May 2023, Rovers announced academy defender Charlie Olson had signed his 1st professional contract, a 1-year deal until 2024 with the option of a further 12 months.

On 23 May 2023, Rovers announced academy midfielder Adam Caddick had signed his 1st professional contract, a 1-year deal until 2024 with the option of a further 12 months.

On 24 May 2023, Rovers announced academy midfielder Ben Fyles had signed his 1st professional contract, a 1-year deal until 2024 with the option of a further 12 months.

On 25 May 2023, Rovers announced academy defender Leo Duru had signed his 1st professional contract, a 1-year deal until 2024 with the option of a further 12 months.

On 26 May 2023, Rovers announced academy forward Dominik Biniek had signed his 1st professional contract, a 1-year deal until 2024 with the option of a further 12 months.

On 27 May 2023, Rovers announced u21 defender Patrick Gamble had signed a new contract, a 2-year deal until 2025 with the option of a further 12 months.

=== June ===
On 19 June 2023, Rovers announced u21 attacker Zak Gilsenan had signed a new contract, a 2-year deal until 2025 with the option of a further 12 months.

On 28 June 2023, Rovers announced u21 midfielder Isaac Whitehall had signed a new contract, a 1-year deal until 2024.

=== July ===
On 10 July 2023, Rovers announced defender Joe Rankin-Costello had signed a new long-term contract, a 4-year deal until 2027.

On 29 July 2023, Rovers announced striker Harry Leonard had signed a new long-term contract, a 4-year deal until 2027.

=== August ===
On 3 August 2023, Rovers announced u21 goalkeeper Felix Goddard had signed a new 2-year deal until 2025.

=== September ===
On 29 September 2023, Rovers announced u18 defender Tom Atcheson had signed his 1st professional contract, a 2 and half year deal until 2026.

=== November ===
On 28 November 2023, Rovers announced midfielder Sammie Szmodics had signed a new contract, a 2 and half year deal until 2026, with the option of a further 12 months.

=== February ===
On 2 February 2024, Rovers announced u21 midfielder Kristi Montgomery had signed a new contract, a 2 and half year deal until 2026, with the option of a further 12 months.

On 8 February 2024, Rovers announced they had been unsuccessful in attempts to sign Duncan McGuire on loan from MLS side Orlando City, A deal had been agreed between the two clubs on February 1 for the player to join on loan until the end of the season, with a view to making the move permanent in the summer but despite all relevant paperwork being completed and uploaded onto the system in good time, the signed registration documents were not submitted prior to the 11pm deadline.

On 9 February 2024, Rovers announced Jon Dahl Tomasson had left his position as head coach by mutual consent along with assistant coach Remy Reynierse, with immediate effect. Rovers announced John Eustace as the new head coach, signing a two-and-a-half-year deal. He will be joined by Matt Gardiner who will be his assistant coach.

On 24 February 2024, Rovers announced Keith Downing as John Eustace's assistant coach alongside Matt Gardiner, also Ben Rosen will leave the club at the end of the month, with Karl Hodges stepping up as interim Head of Performance.

=== March ===
On 18 March 2024, Rovers announced u21 goalkeeper Nicholas Michalski had signed his 1st professional contract, a 2-year deal until 2026

=== April ===
On 23 April 2024, Rovers announced Sammie Szmodics had been voted Player of the Season & also voted Players Player of the Season, he also won most Player of the Match award shared with Scott Wharton, Ryan Hedges's goal against Watford was voted Goal of the Season & Sondre Tronstad was named Newcomer of the year.

=== May ===
On 4 May 2024, Sammie Szmodics was presented with the Championships Golden Boot award.

On 13 May 2024, Rovers announced u21 defender Leo Duru had signed a new contract, a 2-year deal until 2026, with the option of a further 12 months. Rovers also announced club secretary Ian Silvester had left the club & have appointed Brett Baker as head of football administration.

On 15 May 2024, Rovers announced u21 midfielder James Edmondson had signed a new contract, a 3-year deal until 2027.

On 17 May 2024, Rovers announced u18 forward Joe Boggan had signed his 1st professional contract, a 2-year deal until 2026.

On 18 May 2024, Rovers announced Director of Football Gregg Broughton had left the club by mutual consent.

== Backroom staff ==
Backroom staff last updated on 9 February 2024. List is representative of staff available on rovers.co.uk.

Position	Staff
Director of Football	(England) Gregg Broughton
Head Coach	(England) John Eustace
Assistant Head Coach/Set-Piece Coach	(England) Matt Gardiner
Assistant Head Coach	(England) Keith Downing
First Team Coach	(England) David Lowe
Goalkeeping Coach	(England) Ben Benson
First Team Technical Coach & Head of Player Development	(Northern Ireland) Damien Johnson
Head of Performance	(England) Karl Hodges
Consultant	(England) Dr Chris Dalton
Head of Medical Services	(England) Andrew Procter
Head of Performance Analysis	(England) Adam Collins
Head of Recruitment	(England) Sean Kimberley
Head of Academy	(England) Stuart Jones
Head of Academy Coaching	(England) Jordan McCann
Under-23s Lead Coach	(England) Mike Sheron
Head of Education & Welfare	(England) Neil Chadwick
Head of Academy Sports Science and Medical	(England) Russ Wrigley
Head of Academy Recruitment	(England) Michael Cribley
Under-18s Lead Coach	(England) Ryan Kidd

Last updated: 9 February 2024
Source: https://www.rovers.co.uk/club/staff/

== First-team squad ==
Players and squad numbers last updated on 1 February 2024. List is representative of players who have made an appearance for the first-team this season and of information available on Rovers.co.uk.

Note: Flags indicate national team as has been defined under FIFA eligibility rules. Players may hold more than one non-FIFA nationality.

No.	Pos.	Nat.	Player	Date of birth (age)	Year joined	Contract expires	Joined from	Other	Ref.
Goalkeepers
1	GK	(England)	Aynsley Pears	23 April 1998 (age 28)	2020	2027	(England) Middlesbrough		
12	GK	(Sweden)	Leopold Wahlstedt	4 July 1999 (age 27)	2023	2026	(Norway) Odd		
34	GK	(England)	Joe Hilton	11 October 1999 (age 27)	2019	2025	(England) Everton	On loan at Macclesfield	
35	GK	(England)	Jordan Eastham	8 September 2001 (age 25)	2018	2025	Academy	on loan at Hyde United	
38	GK	(England)	Nicholas Michalski	14 March 2007 (age 19)	2023	2026	Academy		
Defenders
2	DF	(England)	Callum Brittain	12 March 1998 (age 28)	2022	2026	(England) Barnsley		
3	DF	(England)	Harry Pickering	29 December 1998 (age 27)	2021	2027 (+1)	(England) Crewe Alexandra	Option for 12-month extension	
4	DF	(Republic of Ireland)	Connor O'Riordan	19 October 2003 (age 23)	2024	2028	(England) Crewe Alexandra		
5	DF	(Scotland)	Dominic Hyam	20 December 1995 (age 30)	2022	2025	(England) Coventry City		
14	DF	(France)	Billy Koumetio	14 November 2002 (age 23)	2024	2024	(England) Liverpool	On loan for the 2023–24 season	
15	DF	(England)	Patrick Gamble	3 October 2003 (age 23)	2010	2025 (+1)	Academy	Option for 12-month extension	
16	DF	(England)	Scott Wharton	3 October 1997 (age 29)	2010	2027	Academy		
17	DF	(England)	Hayden Carter	17 December 1999 (age 26)	2014	2027	Academy		
25	DF	(England)	Jake Batty	5 April 2005 (age 21)	2021	2025	Academy		
26	DF	(England)	Sam Barnes	10 March 2001 (age 25)	2012	2024 (+1)	Academy	Option for 12-month extension	
31	DF	(Northern Ireland)	Tom Atcheson	22 October 2006 (age 20)	2023	2026	Academy		
40	DF	(England)	Rhys Doherty	30 December 2005 (age 20)	2017	2024	Academy		
41	DF	(England)	Leo Duru	12 January 2005 (age 21)	2015	2026 (+1)	Academy	Option for 12-month extension	
45	DF	(England)	Ben Chrisene	12 January 2004 (age 22)	2024	2024	(England) Aston Villa	On loan for the 2023–24 season	
55	DF	(England)	Kyle McFadzean	28 February 1987 (age 39)	2024	2024	(England) Coventry City		
Midfielders
6	MF	(Norway)	Sondre Tronstad	26 August 1995 (age 31)	2023	2026	(Netherlands) Vitesse		
7	MF	(Iceland)	Arnór Sigurðsson	15 May 1999 (age 27)	2023	2025	(Russia) CSKA Moscow		
8	MF	(Republic of Ireland)	Sammie Szmodics	24 September 1995 (age 31)	2022	2026 (+1)	(England) Peterborough United	Option for 12-month extension	
10	MF	(England)	Tyrhys Dolan	28 December 2001 (age 24)	2020	2024 (+1)	(England) Preston North End	Option for 12-month extension	
11	MF	(England)	Joe Rankin-Costello	26 July 1999 (age 27)	2014	2027	Academy		
19	MF	(Wales)	Ryan Hedges	8 July 1995 (age 31)	2022	2025 (+1)	(Scotland) Aberdeen	Option for 12-month extension	
21	MF	(England)	John Buckley	13 October 1999 (age 27)	2006	2027	Academy		
22	MF	(Republic of Ireland)	Zak Gilsenan	8 May 2003 (age 23)	2019	2025 (+1)	(England) Liverpool	Option for 12-month extension	
23	MF	(Scotland)	John Fleck	24 August 1991 (age 35)	2024	2024	(England) Sheffield United		
24	MF	(Republic of Ireland)	Andrew Moran	15 October 2003 (age 23)	2023	2024	(England) Brighton & Hove Albion	On loan for the 2023–24 season	
27	MF	(England)	Lewis Travis	16 October 1997 (age 29)	2014	2026	Academy	on loan at Ipswich Town	
28	MF	(England)	Charlie Weston	13 July 2004 (age 22)	2019	2024	Academy	on loan at Kidderminster Harriers	
30	MF	(England)	Jake Garrett	10 March 2003 (age 23)	2013	2027	Academy		
36	MF	(England)	James Edmondson	1 November 2005 (age 21)	2011	2027	Academy		
39	MF	(Scotland)	Kristi Montgomery	31 May 2004 (age 22)	2013	2026 (+1)	Academy	Option for 12-month extension	
42	MF	(Republic of Ireland)	Rory Finneran	29 February 2008 (age 18)	2016		Academy		
44	MF	(Sweden)	Yasin Ayari	6 October 2003 (age 23)	2024	2024	(England) Brighton & Hove Albion	On loan for the 2023–24 season	
Forwards
9	FW	(England)	Sam Gallagher	15 September 1995 (age 31)	2019	2024 (+1)	(England) Southampton	Option for 12-month extension	
18	FW	(England)	Dilan Markanday	20 August 2001 (age 25)	2022	2025 (+1)	(England) Tottenham Hotspur	Option for 12-month extension	
20	FW	(England)	Harry Leonard	12 September 2003 (age 23)	2013	2027	Academy		
29	FW	(Wales)	Jack Vale	3 March 2001 (age 25)	2017	2025 (+1)	Academy	Option for 12-month extension, On loan at Motherwell	
32	FW	(England)	Igor Tyjon	20 March 2008 (age 18)	2023		Academy		
33	FW	(Germany)	Semir Telalović	23 December 1999 (age 26)	2023	2026 (+1)	(Germany) Borussia Mönchengladbach	Option for 12-month extension	
37	FW	(Republic of Ireland)	Tom Bloxham	30 April 2005 (age 21)	2023	2025	(England) Tottenham Hotspur	On loan at Harrogate Town	

== Transfers ==
=== In ===
Date	Pos	Player	Transferred from	Fee	Ref	Other
15 May 2023	MF	(England) Nathan Dlamini	(England) Aston Villa	Free Transfer		Signed for Blackburn Rovers U18's
21 June 2023	AM	(Iceland) Arnór Sigurðsson	(Russia) CSKA Moscow	End of Season		Joins until the end of season after exercising his right to move clubs in accordance with current FIFA regulations
1 July 2023	CF	(England) Niall Ennis	(England) Plymouth Argyle	Free Transfer		
1 July 2023	CM	(Norway) Sondre Tronstad	(Netherlands) Vitesse	Free Transfer		
1 July 2023	LW	(Republic of Ireland) Tom Bloxham	(England) Tottenham Hotspur	Free Transfer		Signed for Blackburn Rovers U21's
8 August 2023	GK	(Sweden) Leopold Wahlstedt	(Norway) Odds	Undisclosed		
1 September 2023	CF	(Germany) Semir Telalović	(Germany) Borussia Mönchengladbach	Undisclosed		
1 January 2024	AM	(Iceland) Arnór Sigurðsson	(Russia) CSKA Moscow	Free Transfer		
24 January 2024	CB	(Republic of Ireland) Connor O'Riordan	(England) Crewe Alexandra	Undisclosed		
31 January 2024	CB	(England) Kyle McFadzean	(England) Coventry City	Free Transfer		
1 February 2024	CM	(Scotland) John Fleck	(England) Sheffield United	Free Transfer		

=== Out ===
Date	Pos	Player	Transferred to	Fee	Ref
30 June 2023	CB	(Spain) Daniel Ayala	(England) Rotherham United	Released	
30 June 2023	GK	(Republic of Ireland) Will Blease	Unattached	Released	
30 June 2023	LW	(Chile) Ben Brereton Diaz	(Spain) Villarreal	Released	
30 June 2023	CF	(England) Sam Burns	(Greece) Panachaiki	Released	
30 June 2023	CF	(England) Danny Butterworth	(England) Carlisle United	Released	
30 June 2023	CF	(Poland) George Chmiel	(England) Barnoldswick Town	Released	
30 June 2023	AM	(England) Bradley Dack	(England) Sunderland	Released	
30 June 2023	GK	(England) Aidan Dowling	(Northern Ireland) Larne	Released	
30 June 2023	RB	(England) Dan Pike	(England) Tranmere Rovers	Released	
30 June 2023	CB	(England) Ryan Wilson	(England) Sheffield Wednesday	Released	
7 July 2023	RB	(Republic of Ireland) James Brown	(Scotland) Ross County	Free Transfer	
25 July 2023	LB	(England) Tayo Edun	(England) Charlton Athletic	Undisclosed	
3 August 2023	GK	(Belgium) Thomas Kaminski	(England) Luton Town	Undisclosed	
5 August 2023	CB	(England) Ash Phillips	(England) Tottenham Hotspur	Undisclosed	
1 February 2024	CM	(England) Adam Wharton	(England) Crystal Palace	Undisclosed	
1 February 2024	CF	(England) Niall Ennis	(England) Stoke City	Undisclosed	

=== Loans in ===
Date	Pos	Player	Loaned from	On loan until	Ref	Other
26 August 2023	AM	(Republic of Ireland) Andrew Moran	(England) Brighton & Hove Albion	End of Season		
31 August 2023	CB	(England) James Hill	(England) Bournemouth	10 January 2024 (Note: On 10 January, Hill's loan was cut short after being recalled by Bournemouth.)		
5 January 2024	CM	(Sweden) Yasin Ayari	(England) Brighton & Hove Albion	End of Season		
5 January 2024	LB	(England) Ben Chrisene	(England) Aston Villa	End of Season		
1 February 2024	CB	(France) Billy Koumetio	(England) Liverpool	End of Season		

=== Loans out ===
Date	Pos	Player	Loaned to	On loan until	Ref	Other
3 August 2023	GK	(England) Felix Goddard	(England) Marine	30 December 2023 (Note: On 30 December, Goddard's loan at Marine was cut short due to picking up an injury.)		
9 August 2023	CM	(England) Jared Harlock	(Wales) The New Saints	End of Season		
1 September 2023	CM	(England) John Buckley	(England) Sheffield Wednesday	2 January 2024 (Note: On 2 January, Buckley's loan at Sheffield Wednesday was cut short due to picking up an injury.)		
1 September 2023	LB	(England) Georgie Gent	(Scotland) Motherwell	End of Season		
1 September 2023	CF	(Wales) Jack Vale	(England) Lincoln City	5 January 2024 (Note: On 2 January, Vale's loan at Lincoln City was cut short.)		
1 September 2023	LW	(England) Ethan Walker	(England) Morecambe	2 January 2024 (Note: On 2 January, Walker's loan at Morecambe was cut short.)		
9 November 2023	CB	(France) Jalil Saadi	(England) Marine	15 January 2024		
2 January 2024	LW	(England) Ethan Walker	(England) Oldham Athletic	End of Season		
5 January 2024	CM	(England) Lewis Travis	(England) Ipswich Town	End of Season		
6 January 2024	GK	(England) Jordan Eastham	(England) Hyde United	End of Season		
31 January 2024	CF	(Wales) Jack Vale	(Scotland) Motherwell	End of Season		
1 February 2024	LW	(Republic of Ireland) Tom Bloxham	(England) Harrogate Town	End of Season		
23 February 2024	GK	(England) Joe Hilton	(England) Macclesfield	End of Season		
19 March 2024	CM	(England) Charlie Weston	(England) Kidderminster Harriers	End of Season		

== Pre-season and friendlies ==
On May 26, Blackburn announced their first pre-season fixture, against Accrington Stanley. Two further friendlies were added to the schedule on 5 June, against Fleetwood Town and Barnsley. A day later, another two additions were added to the pre-season calendar, Stockport County and Girona. A pre-season training camp in Austria was also announced, along with a friendly against TSV Hartberg.

8 July 2023 Friendly	Accrington Stanley	0–0	Blackburn Rovers	Accrington
15:00 BST		Report		Stadium: Wham Stadium
Note: Match one of two 60-minute matches

8 July 2023 Friendly	Accrington Stanley	2–2	Blackburn Rovers	Accrington
16:20 BST	Nolan 4'; Adedoyin 42' (pen.)	Report	Hedges 44'; Dolan 53'	Stadium: Wham Stadium
Note: Match two of two 60-minute matches

15 July 2023 Friendly	TSV Hartberg	0–6	Blackburn Rovers	Hartberg, Austria
10:30 CEST; 09:30 BST		Report	Rankin-Costello 32', 52', 65' (pen.); Leonard 47'; Hedges 48'; Travis 59'	Stadium: Profertil Arena Hartberg
Note: Match one of two 70-minute matches

15 July 2023 Friendly	TSV Hartberg	1–4	Blackburn Rovers	Hartberg, Austria
14:00 CEST; 13:00 BST	Entrup 57'	Report	Hyam 7'; Szmodics 26'; Weston 35'; Gallagher 65'	Stadium: Profertil Arena Hartberg
Note: Match two of two 70-minute matches

21 July 2023 Friendly	Fleetwood Town	0–0	Blackburn Rovers	Fleetwood
19:30 BST		Report		Stadium: Highbury Stadium

22 July 2023 Friendly	Barnsley	3–4	Blackburn Rovers	Brockhall Village
15:00 BST	Norwood 68', 80'; Cole 90'	Report	Leonard 62'; Buckley 72' (pen.); Gilsenan 74'; Bloxham 84'	Stadium: Brockhall; Attendance: 0 (Behind closed doors)

28 July 2023 Friendly	Stockport County	0–1	Blackburn Rovers	Stockport
19:30 BST		Report	Gilsenan 71'	Stadium: Edgeley Park; Attendance: 2,460 (878 away)

29 July 2023 Friendly	Blackburn Rovers	2–3	Girona	Blackburn
15:00 BST	Leonard 37'; Markanday 67'	Report	Stuani 24'; Tsyhankov 30'; Blind 51'	Stadium: Ewood Park

== Competitions ==
=== Overall record ===
Competition	First match	Last match	Starting round	Final position	Record							
Competition	First match	Last match	Starting round	Final position	Pld	W	D	L	GF	GA	GD	Win %
Championship	5 August 2023	4 May 2024	Matchday 1	19th	46	14	11	21	60	74	−14	30.43
FA Cup	6 January 2024	27 February 2024	Third round	Fifth round	4	3	0	1	10	4	+6	75.00
EFL Cup	8 August 2023	1 November 2023	First round	Fourth round	4	3	0	1	17	7	+10	75.00
Total					54	20	11	23	87	85	+2	37.04

Source: Soccerway

=== Championship ===
==== League table ====
Pos	Team	Pld	W	D	L	GF	GA	GD	Pts	Promotion, qualification or relegation
16	Sunderland	46	16	8	22	52	54	−2	56	
17	Stoke City	46	15	11	20	49	60	−11	56	
18	Queens Park Rangers	46	15	11	20	47	58	−11	56	
19	Blackburn Rovers	46	14	11	21	60	74	−14	53	
20	Sheffield Wednesday	46	15	8	23	44	68	−24	53	
21	Plymouth Argyle	46	13	12	21	59	70	−11	51	
22	Birmingham City (R)	46	13	11	22	50	65	−15	50	Relegated to EFL League One

Source: EFL official website
Rules for classification: 1) Points; 2) Goal difference; 3) Number of goals scored; 4) Head-to-head results; 5) Wins; 6) Away goals; 7) Penalty points (sec 9.5); 8) Number of 12-point sending off offences; 9) Play-off (only if needed to determine promotion/relegation)
(R) Relegated

==== Results summary ====
Overall								Home						Away					
Pld	W	D	L	GF	GA	GD	Pts	W	D	L	GF	GA	GD	W	D	L	GF	GA	GD
46	14	11	21	60	74	−14	53	6	7	10	27	34	−7	8	4	11	33	40	−7

Source: Soccerway

==== Results by round ====
Round	1	2	3	4	5	6	7	8	9	10	11	12	13	14	15	16	17	18	19	20	21	22	23	24	25	26	27	28	30	31	32	33	29^{1}	34	35	36	37	38	39	40	41	42	43	44	45	46
Ground	H	A	H	A	A	H	H	A	H	A	A	H	A	H	A	H	A	H	A	H	H	A	H	A	A	H	A	H	H	H	A	A	A	H	A	H	H	A	H	A	H	A	A	H	H	A
Result	W	D	L	W	L	W	L	L	L	L	W	W	W	L	W	L	W	W	L	L	W	L	L	L	L	D	L	D	L	W	L	D	D	D	L	D	D	D	L	W	D	L	W	L	D	W
Position	6	7	12	9	13	8	12	14	18	20	17	15	11	12	10	11	10	7	7	11	9	11	14	15	15	17	18	17	18	17	17	17	16	16	17	17	18	17	19	17	16	18	17	19	19	19

Source: Soccerway
A = Away; H = Home; W = Win; D = Draw; L = Loss
Notes:
- ^{1} Matchday 29 (vs Cardiff City) was postponed due to FA Cup involvement.

==== Matches ====
On 22 June, the EFL Championship fixtures were released.

Win Draw Loss Fixtures

5 August 2023 1	Blackburn Rovers	2–1	West Bromwich Albion	Blackburn
15:00 BST	Markanday 20'; Leonard 22'; Travis (yellow card) 29'; Szmodics (yellow card) 30'; Carter (yellow card) 48'; Hedges (yellow card) 87'	Report	Yokuşlu (yellow card) 45+4'; Phillips 50'; Kipré (yellow card) 53'; Wallace (yellow card) 55'	Stadium: Ewood Park; Attendance: 16,741; Referee: Dean Whitestone

12 August 2023 2	Rotherham United	2–2	Blackburn Rovers	Rotherham
15:00 BST	Odoffin 23'; Cafú (yellow card) 33'; Lembikisa (yellow card) 45+1'; Onyedinma 48', (yellow card) 49' (yellow-red card) 50'; Johansson (yellow card) 55'	Report	Szmodics (penalty missed) 15', (yellow card) 38', (goal) 75', 78'	Stadium: AESSEAL New York Stadium; Attendance: 10,828; Referee: Bobby Madley

19 August 2023 3	Blackburn Rovers	1–2	Hull City	Blackburn
15:00 BST	Pickering (red card) 17'; Gallagher 74', (yellow card) 83'	Report	Greaves (yellow card) 41'; Traoré (yellow card) 43'; Connolly 81', 88'	Stadium: Ewood Park; Attendance: 13,943; Referee: Oliver Langford

27 August 2023 4	Watford	0–1	Blackburn Rovers	Watford
12:00 BST	Hoedt (yellow card) 24'; Louza (yellow card) 69'; Andrews (yellow card) 69'	Report	Hyam (yellow card) 63'; Hedges 72'; Rankin-Costello (yellow card) 77'	Stadium: Vicarage Road; Attendance: 17,810; Referee: Gavin Ward

2 September 2023 5	Plymouth Argyle	3–0	Blackburn Rovers	Plymouth
15:00 BST	Azaz 27'; Whittaker (yellow card) 36'; Hardie (yellow card) 41', (goal) 77'; Cundle 80'	Report	Pickering (yellow card) 88'	Stadium: Home Park; Attendance: 16,067; Referee: Stephen Martin

16 September 2023 6	Blackburn Rovers	2–1	Middlesbrough	Blackburn
15:00 BST	Carter (yellow card) 28'; Szmodics 31', 49'	Report	Lenihan (yellow card) 40'; Crooks 55'; Hackney (yellow card) 88'	Stadium: Ewood Park; Attendance: 16,348; Referee: James Bell

20 September 2023 7	Blackburn Rovers	1–3	Sunderland	Blackburn
19:45 BST	Travis (yellow card) 31'; Leonard 35', (yellow card) 50'; Wharton (yellow card) 45+3'; Garrett (yellow card) 77'; Rankin-Costello (yellow card) 90+6'	Report	Clarke 28' (pen.), 78'; Neil 45+1'; Pritchard (yellow card) 71'; Ba (yellow card) 86'; Ballard (yellow card) 90+7'	Stadium: Ewood Park; Attendance: 15,621; Referee: John Busby

23 September 2023 8	Ipswich Town	4–3	Blackburn Rovers	Ipswich
15:00 BST	Clarke 4'; Broadhead 18'; Hirst 25', (yellow card) 59'; Morsy (yellow card) 48'; Chaplin (yellow card) 74'; Luongo 79'	Report	Sigurðsson 9', (yellow card) 40'; Moran (yellow card) 31'; Clarke 52' (o.g.); Carter (yellow card) 62'; Szmodics 65'; Travis (yellow card) 72'	Stadium: Portman Road; Attendance: 28,792; Referee: Keith Stroud

1 October 2023 9	Blackburn Rovers	1–4	Leicester City	Blackburn
12:00 BST	Szmodics 9'; Carter (yellow card) 48'; Wharton (yellow card) 70'	Report	Faes 4'; Fatawu (yellow card) 15'; Vardy 28'; Mavididi (yellow card) 30'; Vestergaard (yellow card) 46'; Iheanacho 82' (pen.); Dewsbury-Hall 88'	Stadium: Ewood Park; Attendance: 15,937; Referee: James Linington

4 October 2023 10	Coventry City	1–0	Blackburn Rovers	Coventry
19:45 BST	Binks (yellow card) 60'; Eccles (yellow card) 67'; Wright 85'	Report	Hill (yellow card) 66'	Stadium: Coventry Building Society Arena; Attendance: 22,370; Referee: Jeremy Simpson

7 October 2023 11	Queens Park Rangers	0–4	Blackburn Rovers	Shepherd's Bush
15:00 BST	Clarke-Salter (yellow card) 22'; Smyth (yellow card) 90+3'	Report	Dolan 19'; Sigurðsson 23', 69'; Szmodics (yellow card) 45', (goal) 66'; Gilsenan (yellow card) 90'	Stadium: Loftus Road Stadium; Attendance: 15,376; Referee: Josh Smith

21 October 2023 12	Blackburn Rovers	1–0	Cardiff City	Blackburn
15:00 BST	Dolan (yellow card) 33'; Rankin-Costello 53'; Hyam (yellow card) 87'	Report	Collins (yellow card) 68'	Stadium: Ewood Park; Attendance: 13,572; Referee: Bobby Madley

24 October 2023 13	Millwall	1–2	Blackburn Rovers	Bermondsey
19:45 BST	Harding 3'	Report	Rankin-Costello 22'; Brittain 51'; Dolan (yellow card) 90+3'	Stadium: The Den; Attendance: 13,834; Referee: Andy Davies

28 October 2023 14	Blackburn Rovers	0–1	Swansea City	Blackburn
15:00 BST	Carter (yellow card) 32'; Rankin-Costello (yellow card) 37'; Szmodics (yellow card) 60'; Wharton (yellow card) 63'; Moran (yellow card) 89'	Report	Cullen 28', (yellow card) 50'; Fulton (yellow card) 70'; Ashby (yellow card) 79'	Stadium: Ewood Park; Attendance: 13,102; Referee: Stephen Martin

5 November 2023 15	Norwich City	1–3	Blackburn Rovers	Norwich
12:00 GMT	Hernández (yellow card) 24'; Duffy (yellow card) 46'; Núñez (yellow card) 86'; Sara 90+2'	Report	Dolan 8'; Szmodics 15', 49'; Rankin-Costello (yellow card) 30'; Wharton (red card) 54'; Travis (yellow card) 90+4'	Stadium: Carrow Road; Attendance: 25,696; Referee: Josh Smith

10 November 2023 16	Blackburn Rovers	1–2	Preston North End	Blackburn
20:00 GMT	Szmodics 49'	Report	Browne 35'; Whiteman (yellow card) 72'; Lindsay 90'	Stadium: Ewood Park; Attendance: 20,596; Referee: Thomas Bramall

25 November 2023 17	Stoke City	0–3	Blackburn Rovers	Stoke-on-Trent
15:00 GMT	Thompson (yellow card) 90+1'; Pearson (yellow card) 90+2'	Report	Wharton 4'; Dolan (yellow card) 45+1'; Moran 86'; Szmodics 90+1'	Stadium: Bet365 Stadium; Attendance: 22,652; Referee: Andrew Kitchen

29 November 2023 18	Blackburn Rovers	4–2	Birmingham City	Blackburn
19:45 GMT	Tronstad (yellow card) 31'; Travis (yellow card) 33'; Szmodics 47', 52'; Hill 59'; Wharton (yellow card) 80'; Leonard (yellow card) 87', (goal) 90+2'	Report	Aiwu (yellow card) 28'; Bielik (yellow card) 35'; Dembélé 63', 78'	Stadium: Ewood Park; Attendance: 12,693; Referee: Leigh Doughty

2 December 2023 19	Sheffield Wednesday	3–1	Blackburn Rovers	Owlerton
15:00 GMT	Cadamarteri 5'; Bernard (yellow card) 24'; Johnson 78'; Windass 90+1'; Vaulks (yellow card) 90+4'	Report	Szmodics 65'; Hill (yellow card) 82'	Stadium: Hillsborough Stadium; Attendance: 24,507; Referee: David Webb

9 December 2023 20	Blackburn Rovers	0–2	Leeds United	Blackburn
12:30 GMT	Moran (yellow card) 17'; Wharton (yellow card) 65'; Carter (yellow card) 79'	Report	James 27'; Gray (yellow card) 63'; Summerville 75'; Ampadu (yellow card) 85'	Stadium: Ewood Park; Attendance: 20,963; Referee: Bobby Madley

12 December 2023 21	Blackburn Rovers	2–1	Bristol City	Blackburn
19:45 GMT	Carter (yellow card) 22'; Sigurðsson 35'; Wharton 52'; Brittain (yellow card) 85'; Szmodics (yellow card) 88'; Travis (yellow card) 89'	Report	Knight (yellow card) 51'; Sykes 60'	Stadium: Ewood Park; Attendance: 11,092; Referee: James Linington

16 December 2023 22	Southampton	4–0	Blackburn Rovers	Southampton
15:00 GMT	Downes (yellow card) 37'; Edozie 44'; Armstrong 64'; Smallbone (yellow card) 67'; Aribo (yellow card) 76'; Alcaraz (penalty missed) 86', 90+9'; Mara 90+7'	Report	Brittain (yellow card) 26' (yellow-red card) 55'; Szmodics (yellow card) 67'; Carter (yellow card) 90+10'	Stadium: St Mary's Stadium; Attendance: 27,545; Referee: Graham Scott

23 December 2023 23	Blackburn Rovers	1–2	Watford	Blackburn
15:00 GMT				Stadium: Ewood Park

26 December 2023 24	Huddersfield Town	3–0	Blackburn Rovers	Huddersfield
15:00 GMT	Headley 28'; Lees (yellow card) 49'; Thomas 55'; Burgzorg 68'	Report	Carter (yellow card) 35'; Wharton (yellow card) 51'; Brittain (yellow card) 90+1'; Travis (yellow card) 90+5'	Stadium: John Smith's Stadium; Attendance: 20,516; Referee: Darren England

29 December 2023 25	Hull City	3–2	Blackburn Rovers	Kingston upon Hull
19:45 GMT	Tufan (yellow card) 5'; Delap 11'; Connolly 18'; Jones 63'; Seri (yellow card) 72'; Morton (yellow card) 81'	Report	Garrett (yellow card) 29'; Szmodics 33'; Hill (yellow card) 37'; Pickering 45+3'; Tronstad (yellow card) 52'; Hyam (yellow card) 58' (yellow-red card) 74'	Stadium: MKM Stadium; Attendance: 21,876; Referee: Matt Donohue

1 January 2023 26	Blackburn Rovers	2–2	Rotherham United	Blackburn
15:00 GMT	Sigurðsson 8'; Szmodics 46'	Report	Morrison 31', (yellow card) 44'; Eaves 82'	Stadium: Ewood Park; Attendance: 13,054; Referee: Jarred Gillett

13 January 2024 27	West Bromwich Albion	4–1	Blackburn Rovers	West Bromwich
15:00 GMT	Fellows 11'; Thomas-Asante 30', 63'; Hyam 33' (o.g.); Bartley (yellow card) 40'; Kipre (yellow card) 43'	Report	Garrett 60'	Stadium: Hawthorns; Attendance: 24,409 (1,258 away); Referee: Stephen Martin

20 January 2024 28	Blackburn Rovers	1–1	Huddersfield Town	Blackburn
15:00 GMT	Wharton 7', (yellow card) 90+1'; Tronstad (yellow card) 39'	Report	Helik 23'; Hogg (yellow card) 65'; Radulović (yellow card) 90+2'	Stadium: Ewood Park; Attendance: 14,529; Referee: James Linington

3 February 2024 30	Blackburn Rovers	1–2	Queens Park Rangers	Blackburn
15:00 GMT	Tronstad (yellow card) 39'; Gallagher 73'; Ayari (yellow card) 90+9'	Report	Armstrong (yellow card) 41'; Dixon-Bonner (yellow card) 54'; Pears 61' (o.g.); Hodge 64'; Begovic (yellow card) 90+4'	Stadium: Ewood Park; Attendance: 12,888; Referee: Geoff Eltringham

10 February 2024 31	Blackburn Rovers	3–1	Stoke City	Blackburn
15:00 GMT	Dolan 7', 37'; Szmodics 20'	Report	McNally (yellow card) 29'; Ennis 39'; Tchamadeu (yellow card) 54'	Stadium: Ewood Park; Attendance: 15,104; Referee: Gavin Ward

13 February 2024 32	Birmingham City	1–0	Blackburn Rovers	Bordesley
19:45 GMT	Laird (yellow card) 64'; Dozzell 77'; Dembélé (yellow card) 84'	Report	Garrett (yellow card) 49'; Hyam (yellow card) 49'; Tronstad (yellow card) 90+1'	Stadium: St Andrew's Stadium; Attendance: 18,117; Referee: Thomas Kirk

17 February 2024 33	Preston North End	2–2	Blackburn Rovers	Preston
15:00 GMT	Brady 39'; Riis 43'	Report	Szmodics 7'; Gallagher 23'	Stadium: Deepdale; Attendance: 20,924; Referee: David Webb

20 February 2024 29	Cardiff City	0–0	Blackburn Rovers	Leckwith
19:45 GMT	Wintle (yellow card) 90+3'; Goutas (yellow card) 90+3'	Report	Hyam (yellow card) 46'; Tronstad (yellow card) 66'; Buckley (yellow card) 75'	Stadium: Cardiff City Stadium; Attendance: 17,131; Referee: Leigh Doughty

24 February 2024 34	Blackburn Rovers	1–1	Norwich City	Blackburn
15:00 GMT	Dolan (yellow card) 14'; Hyam 56'; Wharton (yellow card) 90+4'	Report	Núñez 22'; Fassnacht (yellow card) 79'; Gibson (yellow card) 90+4'	Stadium: Ewood Park; Attendance: 12,956; Referee: Oliver Langford

2 March 2024 35	Swansea City	2–1	Blackburn Rovers	Landore
15:00 GMT	Allen 7'; Paterson 19'; Tymon (yellow card) 72'	Report	McFadzean (yellow card) 15'; Dolan (yellow card) 34'; Szmodics 67'	Stadium: Swansea.com Stadium; Attendance: 15,369; Referee: Rebecca Welch

5 March 2024 36	Blackburn Rovers	1–1	Millwall	Blackburn
19:45 GMT	Szmodics 63'	Report	Tanganga (yellow card) 36'; Obafemi 54'	Stadium: Ewood Park; Attendance: 11,711; Referee: Jeremy Simpson

9 March 2024 37	Blackburn Rovers	1–1	Plymouth Argyle	Blackburn
15:00 GMT	Szmodics 7'; Brittain (yellow card) 33'; McFadzean (red card) 54'; Ayari (yellow card) 90'	Report	Mumba (yellow card) 56'; Whittaker 74'	Stadium: Ewood Park; Attendance: 14,108; Referee: Andrew Kitchen

16 March 2024 38	Middlesbrough	0–0	Blackburn Rovers	Middlesbrough
15:00 GMT	Latte Lath (yellow card) 31'; Ayling (yellow card) 57'; Greenwood (yellow card) 90'	Report	Wharton (yellow card) 31'; Hedges (yellow card) 81'; Ayari (yellow card) 89'	Stadium: Riverside Stadium; Attendance: 25,554; Referee: Keith Stroud

29 March 2024 39	Blackburn Rovers	0–1	Ipswich Town	Blackburn
17:30 GMT	Pickering (yellow card) 6'; Dolan (yellow card) 45'	Report	Davis (yellow card) 3'; Chaplin 9'; Luongo (yellow card) 81'; Jackson (yellow card) 84'	Stadium: Ewood Park; Attendance: 18,235; Referee: Stuart Attwell
Note: Fixture was initially scheduled for a 15:00 kick-off, but was moved for live Sky Sports broadcasting.

1 April 2024 40	Sunderland	1–5	Blackburn Rovers	Sunderland
15:00 BST	Rigg 77'	Report	Szmodics 29', 36'; Hedges 47'; Dolan 54'; Moran 81'	Stadium: Stadium of Light; Attendance: 42,019; Referee: John Busby

6 April 2024 41	Blackburn Rovers	0–0	Southampton	Blackburn
15:00 BST	Dolan (yellow card) 59'; Pickering (yellow card) 89'; Rankin-Costello (yellow card) 90+3'	Report	Brooks (yellow card) 62'; Adams (yellow card) 90+5'	Stadium: Ewood Park; Attendance: 15,679; Referee: Craig Pawson

10 April 2024 42	Bristol City	5–0	Blackburn Rovers	Bristol
19:45 BST	Conway 24', 32'; Mehmeti 73'; Wells 78', 90+6'	Report	Rankin-Costello (yellow card) 29'; McFadzean (yellow card) 77'	Stadium: Ashton Gate; Attendance: 19,672; Referee: Robert Madley

13 April 2024 43	Leeds United	0–1	Blackburn Rovers	Leeds
12:30 BST	Joseph (yellow card) 90+7'	Report	Carter (yellow card) 28'; Dolan (yellow card) 42'; Tronstad (yellow card) 47'; Szmodics 82'; Pears (yellow card) 85'	Stadium: Elland Road; Attendance: 36,518; Referee: James Bell
Note: Fixture was initially scheduled for a 15:00 kick-off, but was moved for live Sky Sports coverage.

21 April 2024 44	Blackburn Rovers	1–3	Sheffield Wednesday	Blackburn
12:30 BST	Szmodics 9', (yellow card) 61'; Carter (yellow card) 77'; Hyam (yellow card) 90+2'	Report	Windass 6'; Johnson 58', (yellow card) 67'; Pears 64' (o.g.); Palmer (yellow card) 69'; Vaulks (yellow card) 90+3'	Stadium: Ewood Park; Attendance: 21,718; Referee: Josh Smith
Note: Fixture was initially scheduled for 20 April, but was moved for live Sky Sports coverage.

27 April 2024 45	Blackburn Rovers	0–0	Coventry City	Blackburn
15:00 BST		Report	Palmer (yellow card) 50'; Kitching (red card) 62'	Stadium: Ewood Park; Attendance: 20,026; Referee: Anthony Backhouse

4 May 2024 46	Leicester City	0–2	Blackburn Rovers	Leicester
12:30 BST	Fatawu (yellow card) 36'; Justin (yellow card) 58'	Report	Szmodics 68', 90+4', (yellow card) 69'; Rankin-Costello (yellow card) 86'	Stadium: King Power Stadium; Attendance: 32,117; Referee: Andrew Kitchen

=== FA Cup ===
Rovers entered the competition in the third round and were drawn at home to Cambridge United then to Wrexham in the fourth round and Newcastle United in the fifth round.

6 January 2024 Third round	Blackburn Rovers	5–2	Cambridge United	Blackburn
15:00 GMT	Szmodics 23', 37', 45+3'; Sigurðsson 66'; Leonard 81'	Report	Lankester 6'; Kaikai 26'; Bennett (yellow card) 53'	Stadium: Ewood Park; Attendance: 8,311; Referee: Geoff Eltringham

29 January 2024 Fourth round	Blackburn Rovers	4–1	Wrexham	Blackburn
19:30 GMT	Szmodics 32', 45+1'; Gallagher 34'; Garrett (yellow card) 51'; Tronstad 59'	Report	Cannon 19'	Stadium: Ewood Park; Attendance: 18,169; Referee: Andrew Madley

27 February 2024 Fifth round	Blackburn Rovers	1–1 (a.e.t.) (3–4 p)	Newcastle United	Blackburn
20:00 GMT	Moran (yellow card) 18'; Szmodics 79'; Chrisene (yellow card) 110'; Ayari (yellow card) 118'	Report	Gordon 71'; Lascelles (yellow card) 103'; Longstaff (yellow card) 120+1'	Stadium: Ewood Park; Attendance: 22,730; Referee: Jarred Gillett
	Penalties
	Szmodics (penalty missed); Brittain (penalty scored); Sigurðsson (penalty scored); Ayari (penalty scored); Hyam (penalty missed)		(penalty scored) Schär; (penalty missed) Barnes; (penalty scored) Guimarães; (penalty scored) Anderson; (penalty scored) Gordon

=== EFL Cup ===
Blackburn were drawn at home against Walsall in the first round, away to Harrogate Town in the second round, back at home against Cardiff City for the third round and then away again, against Chelsea, in the fourth round.

8 August 2023 First round	Blackburn Rovers	4–3	Walsall	Blackburn
19:45 BST	Gilsenan 21'; Ennis 40'; Garrett 50'; Buckley 67'	Report	McEntee 19'; Tierney 37'; Johnson (yellow card) 81'; Maher 84'	Stadium: Ewood Park; Attendance: 6,173; Referee: Ben Speedie

30 August 2023 Second round	Harrogate Town	0–8	Blackburn Rovers	Harrogate
19:45 BST		Report	Garrett 10' (yellow card) 22'; Gallagher 13'; Buckley 34', 52' (pen.); Markanday 45+1'; Gilsenan 67'; Bloxham 72'; Edmondson 75' (yellow card) 90+3'	Stadium: EnviroVent Stadium; Attendance: 2,653; Referee: Will Finnie

26 September 2023 Third round	Blackburn Rovers	5–2	Cardiff City	Blackburn
19:45 BST	Garrett 13'; Sigurðsson 36' (penalty missed) 53'; Moran 49', 54'; Markanday 69'	Report	Robinson 18'; Etete 45+3'	Stadium: Ewood Park; Attendance: 5,371; Referee: Andrew Kitchen

1 November 2023 Fourth round	Chelsea	2–0	Blackburn Rovers	Fulham
19:45 GMT	Badiashile 30'; Sterling 59'	Report	Pickering (yellow card) 23'; Sigurðsson (yellow card) 81'	Stadium: Stamford Bridge; Attendance: 39,548; Referee: Tim Robinson

== Squad statistics ==
=== Appearances and goals ===
As of 4 May 2024

No.	Pos	Nat	Player	Total		Championship		FA Cup		EFL Cup	
No.	Pos	Nat	Player	Apps	Goals	Apps	Goals	Apps	Goals	Apps	Goals
1	GK	(England) ENG	Aynsley Pears	28	0	26+0	0	2+0	0	0+0	0
12	GK	(Sweden) SWE	Leopold Wahlstedt	25	0	20+1	0	1+0	0	3+0	0
38	GK	(England) ENG	Nicholas Michalski	0	0	0+0	0	0+0	0	0+0	0
2	DF	(England) ENG	Callum Brittain	49	1	40+4	1	2+0	0	2+1	0
3	DF	(England) ENG	Harry Pickering	41	1	35+1	1	1+0	0	3+1	0
4	DF	(Republic of Ireland) IRL	Connor O'Riordan	2	0	0+2	0	0+0	0	0+0	0
5	DF	(Scotland) SCO	Dominic Hyam (C)	40	1	35+0	1	3+0	0	1+1	0
14	DF	(France) FRA	Billy Koumetio (on loan from Liverpool)	1	0	0+0	0	0+1	0	0+0	0
15	DF	(England) ENG	Patrick Gamble	2	0	0+0	0	0+1	0	1+0	0
16	DF	(England) ENG	Scott Wharton	34	2	24+4	2	2+0	0	3+1	0
17	DF	(England) ENG	Hayden Carter	35	0	29+2	0	1+0	0	1+2	0
25	DF	(England) ENG	Jake Batty	1	0	0+0	0	0+0	0	1+0	0
26	DF	(England) ENG	Sam Barnes	1	0	0+0	0	0+0	0	1+0	0
31	DF	(Northern Ireland) NIR	Tom Atcheson	2	0	0+0	0	0+1	0	0+1	0
40	DF	(England) ENG	Rhys Doherty	0	0	0+0	0	0+0	0	0+0	0
41	DF	(England) ENG	Leo Duru	0	0	0+0	0	0+0	0	0+0	0
45	DF	(England) ENG	Ben Chrisene (on loan from Aston Villa)	18	0	7+9	0	1+1	0	0+0	0
55	DF	(England) ENG	Kyle McFadzean	13	0	10+2	0	1+0	0	0+0	0
6	MF	(Norway) NOR	Sondre Tronstad	41	1	34+2	0	1+1	1	2+1	0
7	MF	(Iceland) ISL	Arnór Sigurðsson	34	7	17+12	5	2+1	1	1+1	1
8	MF	(Republic of Ireland) IRL	Sammie Szmodics (VC)	48	33	44+0	27	3+0	6	0+1	0
10	MF	(England) ENG	Tyrhys Dolan	39	5	29+7	5	2+0	0	0+1	0
11	MF	(England) ENG	Joe Rankin-Costello	29	2	21+6	2	1+0	0	1+0	0
19	MF	(Wales) WAL	Ryan Hedges	18	2	13+4	2	0+0	0	1+0	0
21	MF	(England) ENG	John Buckley	14	3	5+6	0	1+0	0	2+0	3
22	MF	(Republic of Ireland) IRL	Zak Gilsenan	5	2	0+2	0	0+0	0	1+2	2
23	MF	(Scotland) SCO	John Fleck	1	0	1+0	0	0+0	0	0+0	0
24	MF	(Republic of Ireland) IRL	Andrew Moran (on loan from Brighton & Hove Albion)	41	4	19+16	2	3+0	0	3+0	2
30	MF	(England) ENG	Jake Garrett	28	4	6+15	1	2+1	0	4+0	3
36	MF	(England) ENG	James Edmondson	1	1	0+0	0	0+0	0	0+1	1
39	MF	(Scotland) SCO	Kristi Montgomery	0	0	0+0	0	0+0	0	0+0	0
42	MF	(Republic of Ireland) IRL	Rory Finneran	1	0	0+0	0	0+1	0	0+0	0
44	MF	(Sweden) SWE	Yasin Ayari (on loan from Brighton & Hove Albion)	13	0	2+8	0	0+3	0	0+0	0
9	FW	(England) ENG	Sam Gallagher	27	5	20+4	3	2+0	1	1+0	1
18	FW	(England) ENG	Dilan Markanday	27	3	7+14	1	0+2	0	3+1	2
20	FW	(England) ENG	Harry Leonard	22	4	9+10	3	0+1	1	1+1	0
32	FW	(England) ENG	Igor Tyjon	0	0	0+0	0	0+0	0	0+0	0
33	FW	(Germany) GER	Semir Telalović	20	0	2+15	0	1+1	0	1+0	0
Players out on loan:
27	MF	(England) ENG	Lewis Travis (on loan at Ipswich Town)	22	0	12+8	0	0+0	0	1+1	0
28	MF	(England) ENG	Charlie Weston (on loans at Kidderminster Harriers)	0	0	0+0	0	0+0	0	0+0	0
29	FW	(Wales) WAL	Jack Vale (on loan at Motherwell)	0	0	0+0	0	0+0	0	0+0	0
34	GK	(England) ENG	Joe Hilton (on loan at Macclesfield)	1	0	0+0	0	0+0	0	1+0	0
35	GK	(England) ENG	Jordan Eastham (on loan at Hyde United)	0	0	0+0	0	0+0	0	0+0	0
37	MF	(Republic of Ireland) IRL	Tom Bloxham (on loan at Harrogate Town)	2	1	0+1	0	0+0	0	0+1	1
Players that played for Blackburn Rovers this season that have left the club:
4	DF	(England) ENG	James Hill (on loan from Bournemouth)	20	1	14+4	1	0+0	0	2+0	0
14	FW	(England) ENG	Niall Ennis	13	1	3+8	0	0+0	0	1+1	1
23	MF	(England) ENG	Adam Wharton	29	2	22+4	2	1+0	0	2+0	0

=== Goalscorers ===
As of 4 May 2024

Rank	No.	Pos.	Name	League	FA Cup	EFL Cup	Total
1	8	MF	(Republic of Ireland) Sammie Szmodics	27	6	0	33
2	7	MF	(Iceland) Arnór Sigurðsson	5	1	1	7
3	9	FW	(England) Sam Gallagher	3	1	1	5
=	10	MF	(England) Tyrhys Dolan	5	0	0	5
5	20	FW	(England) Harry Leonard	3	1	0	4
=	24	MF	(Republic of Ireland) Andrew Moran	2	0	2	4
=	30	MF	(England) Jake Garrett	1	0	3	4
8	18	FW	(England) Dilan Markanday	1	0	2	3
=	21	MF	(England) John Buckley	0	0	3	3
10	11	MF	(England) Joe Rankin-Costello	2	0	0	2
=	16	DF	(England) Scott Wharton	2	0	0	2
=	19	MF	(Wales) Ryan Hedges	2	0	0	2
=	22	MF	(Republic of Ireland) Zak Gilsenan	0	0	2	2
=	23	MF	(England) Adam Wharton	2	0	0	2
15	2	DF	(England) Callum Brittain	1	0	0	1
=	3	DF	(England) Harry Pickering	1	0	0	1
=	4	DF	(England) James Hill	1	0	0	1
=	5	DF	(England) Dominic Hyam	1	0	0	1
=	6	MF	(Norway) Sondre Tronstad	0	1	0	1
=	14	FW	(England) Niall Ennis	0	0	1	1
=	36	MF	(England) James Edmondson	0	0	1	1
=	37	MF	(Republic of Ireland) Tom Bloxham	0	0	1	1
—	—	—	Own goal	1	0	0	1
Total				60	10	17	87

=== Assists ===
As of 4 May 2024

Rank	No.	Pos.	Name	League	FA Cup	EFL Cup	Total
1	24	MF	(Republic of Ireland) Andrew Moran	6	0	3	9
2	2	DF	(England) Callum Brittain	6	1	1	8
=	9	FW	(England) Sam Gallagher	3	2	1	6
4	19	MF	(Wales) Ryan Hedges	3	0	2	5
5	4	DF	(England) James Hill	3	0	1	4
=	7	MF	(Iceland) Arnór Sigurðsson	2	2	0	4
=	8	MF	(Republic of Ireland) Sammie Szmodics	4	0	0	4
=	10	MF	(England) Tyrhys Dolan	4	0	0	4
=	11	MF	(England) Joe Rankin-Costello	4	0	0	4
=	17	DF	(England) Hayden Carter	2	2	0	4
11	21	MF	(England) John Buckley	1	0	2	3
=	23	MF	(England) Adam Wharton	3	0	0	3
13	3	DF	(England) Harry Pickering	1	1	0	2
=	6	MF	(Norway) Sondre Tronstad	1	1	0	2
=	20	FW	(England) Harry Leonard	2	0	0	2
=	27	MF	(England) Lewis Travis	2	0	0	2
=	30	MF	(England) Jake Garrett	1	0	1	2
18	22	MF	(Republic of Ireland) Zak Gilsenan	0	0	1	1
=	44	MF	(Sweden) Yasin Ayari	1	0	0	1
Total				47	9	12	68
