= Leopold Wahlstedt =

Swedish footballer (born 1999)

Personal information
- Date of birth: 4 July 1999 (age 27)
- Place of birth: Stockholm, Sweden
- Height: 1.90 m (6 ft 3 in)
- Position: Goalkeeper

Team information
- Current team: Rosenborg
- Number: 1

Youth career
- AIK
- Norrtulls SK
- AIK
- 2015–2017: FC Djursholm

Senior career*
| Years | Team | Apps | (Gls) |
| 2018 | Dalkurd FF | 0 | (0) |
| 2019–2020 | Arendal | 41 | (0) |
| 2021 | Odd 2 | 14 | (0) |
| 2021–2023 | Odd | 60 | (0) |
| 2023–2024 | Blackburn Rovers | 21 | (0) |
| 2024–2026 | AGF | 5 | (0) |
| 2026– | Rosenborg | 27 | (0) |

International career
| 2017 | Sweden U19 | 1 | (0) |
| 2023 | Sweden | 1 | (0) |
- * Club domestic league appearances and goals as of 22 November 2026

Leopold Wahlstedt (born 4 July 1999) is a Swedish professional footballer who plays as a goalkeeper for Eliteserien club Rosenborg.

== Club career ==
=== Early years ===
Born in Stockholm, Wahlstedt played youth football for AIK and Norrtulls SK, before moving to FC Djursholm. In April 2018, he signed with recently promoted Allsvenskan club Dalkurd FF. He made his professional debut for the club on 21 August 2018, starting in a 2–1 Svenska Cupen win against Karlbergs BK. During his sole season at the club, he failed to make a single league appearance, only playing the one match in Svenska Cupen.

=== Arendal ===
In January 2019, Wahlstedt moved to Norwegian third tier club Arendal. Through the first three games of the season, Wahlstedt was a backup, but he soon earned the starting job after making his debut on 1 May 2019 in the Norwegian Football Cup match against Vindbjart, which his team won 3–0. His league debut followed three days later in a 5–3 loss to Fredrikstad.

=== Odd ===
Wahlstedt joined the Eliteserien side Odd from Arendal ahead of the 2021 season as a backup for Sondre Rossbach. On 12 September 2021, he made his Eliteserien debut for the club in a 1–1 draw against Bodø/Glimt. From that date, he made the place his own. In the following two seasons, he was considered the best and most potential goalkeeper in Eliteserien, with many rumors of moving to bigger clubs. Representatives from clubs such as Liverpool, Villarreal and FC Schalke 04 were present during the games at Skagerak Arena.

=== Blackburn Rovers ===
On 8 August 2023, Wahlstedt joined Championship club Blackburn Rovers on a three-year deal for an undisclosed fee. He made his debut for Blackburn on 1 October 2023, coming on as a substitute for the injured Aynsley Pears during a 4–1 defeat to Leicester City. Throughout the 2023–24 season, Wahlstedt made 21 Championship appearances, starting in 20 matches. His debut season in English football included periods of scrutiny, particularly in December 2023, when he was criticised for a series of errors on aerial balls that led to goals against Southampton, Watford, Rotherham United, and Huddersfield Town. Blackburn manager Jon Dahl Tomasson addressed the situation publicly, attributing the mistakes to Wahlstedt’s inexperience and highlighting the learning curve associated with playing regularly in the Championship.

=== AGF ===
On 3 July 2024, Wahlstedt joined Danish Superliga club AGF for an undisclosed fee. He made his competitive debut on 25 September in a third-round Danish Cup match against VSK Aarhus, but was substituted after 15 minutes following an ankle injury. Initial examinations revealed a broken bone, sidelining him for an extended period. He resumed training in January 2025 during AGF's winter camp in Estepona, Spain.

Initially serving as backup to veteran Jesper Hansen, Wahlstedt was named starting goalkeeper by head coach Uwe Rösler on 24 April 2025. The change followed a poor run of form, with the club winless in its previous four matches.

Following the conclusion of the 2024–25 season, AGF appointed Jakob Poulsen as head coach, succeeding Rösler. Under Poulsen, the goalkeeping position continued to rotate between Wahlstedt and Hansen. Wahlstedt started Poulsen's first league match in charge, but after an error in the opening fixture of the 2025–26 season, Hansen was restored as first-choice goalkeeper from the second match onwards. Poulsen stated that the decision was based on an overall assessment of the team's needs and the desire for stability in goal. Wahlstedt subsequently did not feature in competitive matches during the early part of the season, including AGF's cup fixtures, with Hansen remaining the preferred option. Despite the lack of playing time, Poulsen indicated that Wahlstedt continued to perform well in training and remained part of the club's goalkeeping rotation.

=== Rosenborg ===
On 25 January 2026, Wahlstedt returned to Norway, signing a four-year contract with Eliteserien club Rosenborg.

== International career ==
In September 2022, Wahlstedt received his first call-up to the Sweden national team after a convincing season in Eliteserien. He made his full international for debut Sweden on 9 January 2023, playing for 90 minutes in a friendly 2–0 win against Finland.

== Personal life ==
Wahlstedt's paternal grandfather is from Sicily, Italy.

== Career statistics ==
=== Club ===
As of match played 22 November 2026

Appearances and goals by club, season and competition
| Club | Season | League | | | National cup (Note: Includes Svenska Cupen, Norwegian Cup, Danish Cup) | | League cup (Note: Includes EFL Cup) | | Other | | Total | |
| Club | Season | Division | Apps | Goals | Apps | Goals | Apps | Goals | Apps | Goals | Apps | Goals |
|---|---|---|---|---|---|---|---|---|---|---|---|---|
| Dalkurd FF | 2018 | Allsvenskan | 0 | 0 | 1 | 0 | — | | — | | 1 | 0 |
| Arendal | 2019 | 2. divisjon | 22 | 0 | 0 | 0 | — | | — | | 22 | 0 |
| Arendal | 2020 | 2. divisjon | 19 | 0 | 0 | 0 | — | | — | | 19 | 0 |
| Arendal | Total | | 41 | 0 | 0 | 0 | — | | — | | 41 | 0 |
| Odd 2 | 2021 | 2. divisjon | 14 | 0 | — | | — | | — | | 14 | 0 |
| Odd | 2021 | Eliteserien | 13 | 0 | 2 | 0 | — | | — | | 15 | 0 |
| Odd | 2022 | Eliteserien | 30 | 0 | 1 | 0 | — | | — | | 31 | 0 |
| Odd | 2023 | Eliteserien | 17 | 0 | 1 | 0 | — | | — | | 18 | 0 |
| Odd | Total | | 60 | 0 | 4 | 0 | — | | — | | 64 | 0 |
| Blackburn Rovers | 2023–24 | Championship | 21 | 0 | 0 | 0 | 3 | 0 | — | | 24 | 0 |
| AGF | 2024–25 | Danish Superliga | 4 | 0 | 1 | 0 | — | | — | | 5 | 0 |
| AGF | 2025–26 | Danish Superliga | 1 | 0 | 0 | 0 | — | | — | | 1 | 0 |
| AGF | Total | | 5 | 0 | 1 | 0 | — | | — | | 6 | 0 |
| Rosenborg | 2026 | Eliteserien | 27 | 0 | 1 | 0 | — | | — | | 28 | 0 |
| Career total | | | 168 | 0 | 7 | 0 | 3 | 0 | 0 | 0 | -78 | 0 |

=== International ===
Appearances and goals by national team and year
| National team | Year | Apps | Goals |
|---|---|---|---|
| Sweden | 2023 | 1 | 0 |
| Total | | 1 | 0 |
