= Aynsley Pears =

English footballer (born 1998)

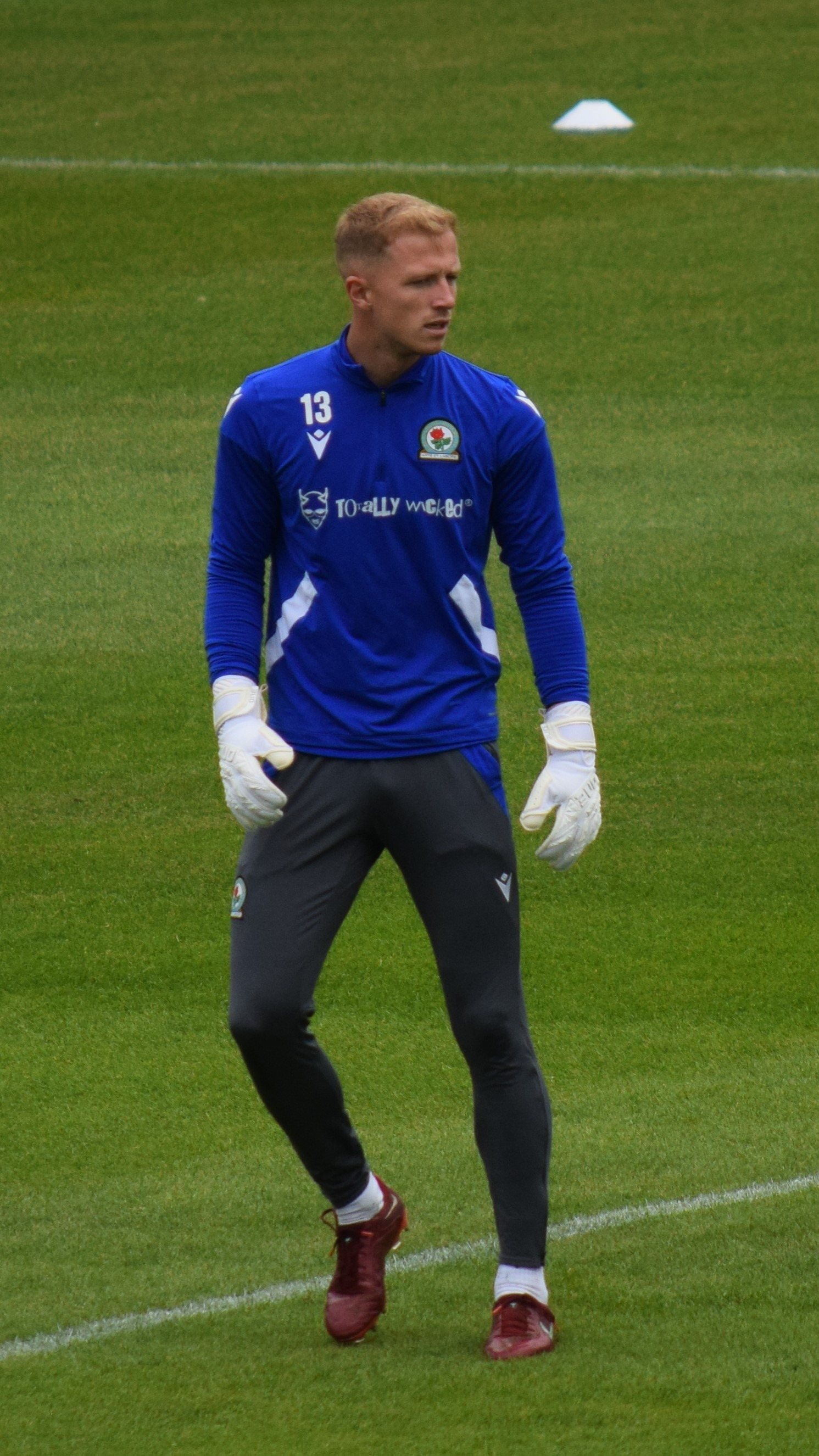
- Pears warming up for Blackburn Rovers in 2022

Personal information
- Full name: Aynsley Alan William Pears
- Date of birth: 23 April 1998 (age 28)
- Place of birth: Durham, England
- Height: 6 ft 1 in (1.85 m)
- Position: Goalkeeper

Team information
- Current team: Blackburn Rovers
- Number: 1

Youth career
- 2007–2016: Middlesbrough

Senior career*
Years	Team	Apps	(Gls)
2016–2020	Middlesbrough	24	(0)
2018	→ Darlington (loan)	16	(0)
2018–2019	→ Gateshead (loan)	44	(0)
2020–	Blackburn Rovers	106	(0)

International career
2016	England U19	2	(0)
- * Club domestic league appearances and goals as of 00:11, 15 October 2026 (UTC)

Aynsley Alan William Pears (born 23 April 1998) is an English professional footballer who plays as a goalkeeper for EFL Championship club Blackburn Rovers.

== Early life ==
Pears is the son of former Middlesbrough goalkeeper Stephen Pears.

== Club career ==
=== Middlesbrough ===
On 17 January 2018, Pears was loaned out to Darlington, first for one month, then again for the remainder of the season. He would make a total of 16 appearances for the National League North side, keeping 5 clean sheets in his first 9 games.

On 27 July 2018, Pears joined Gateshead on a season-long loan. He would go on to make a total of 45 appearances, keeping 12 clean sheets and netting the club's Player's Player of the Year award at the season's close.

Following this previous campaign, Pears made his debut for parent club Middlesbrough in a 2–2 draw with Crewe Alexandra in the EFL Cup, which Crewe won 4–2 on penalties. In total, Pears made 25 competitive appearances for Middlesbrough before departing for fellow Championship side Blackburn Rovers.

=== Blackburn Rovers ===
On 16 October 2020, Pears joined EFL Championship club Blackburn Rovers for an undisclosed fee, signing a four-year deal with the Lancashire outfit. It saw Pears end his 13-year association with Middlesbrough, although the move saw Pears link-up with former Boro manager Tony Mowbray and academy teammate Harry Chapman once again.

On 27 October, Pears made his debut for his new side, a game which saw Blackburn record a 4–2 defeat against Championship league leaders Reading.

On 1 October 2023, Pears had to be substituted off having sustained an injury to his foot following a collision with Jamie Vardy in Blackburn's 4–1 defeat at home against Leicester City. He was replaced by debutant Leopold Wahlstedt.

On 12 April 2025, Pears sustained a late ankle injury ahead of a 1–0 win over Luton Town, which resulted in him being dropped to the bench in favour of Balázs Tóth. On 4 November, Pears made his first appearance since the injury after coming on as a late substitute for Tóth, keeping a clean sheet in a 1–0 win over Bristol City.

On 26 December 2025, Pears made his 100th appearance for Rovers against his former club Middlesbrough in a 0–0 draw.

== International career ==
On 24 August 2016, Pears was called up alongside academy teammate Hayden Coulson by the England under-19s national team for their international friendly fixtures against the Netherlands and Belgium.

Pears made his England U19s debut on 1 September in a 1–1 draw against the Netherlands, coming on as a substitute for Will Mannion in the 46th minute. His final appearance for the U19s national team came on 10 October in England's 2–1 win against Bulgaria.

On 21 March 2018, Pears was called up by the under-20s for their games against Poland and Portugal after Leeds United youngster Will Huffer was forced to withdraw at the last minute due to an injury. It would be the last time Pears was called up for the England youth setup.

== Career statistics ==
As of match played 8 September 2026

Appearances and goals by club, season and competition
Club	Season	League			FA Cup		League Cup		Other		Total	
Club	Season	Division	Apps	Goals	Apps	Goals	Apps	Goals	Apps	Goals	Apps	Goals
Middlesbrough	2016–17	Premier League	0	0	0	0	0	0	0	0	0	0
Middlesbrough	2017–18	Championship	0	0	0	0	0	0	0	0	0	0
Middlesbrough	2018–19	Championship	0	0	0	0	0	0	0	0	0	0
Middlesbrough	2019–20	Championship	24	0	0	0	1	0	0	0	25	0
Middlesbrough	Total		24	0	0	0	1	0	0	0	25	0
Darlington (loan)	2017–18	National League North	16	0	—		—		0	0	16	0
Gateshead (loan)	2018–19	National League	44	0	1	0	—		1 (Note: One appearance in FA Trophy)	0	46	0
Blackburn Rovers	2020–21	Championship	3	0	1	0	0	0	0	0	4	0
Blackburn Rovers	2021–22	Championship	3	0	1	0	0	0	0	0	4	0
Blackburn Rovers	2022–23	Championship	18	0	4	0	4	0	0	0	26	0
Blackburn Rovers	2023–24	Championship	26	0	2	0	0	0	0	0	28	0
Blackburn Rovers	2024–25	Championship	40	0	0	0	2	0	0	0	42	0
Blackburn Rovers	2025–26	Championship	13	0	0	0	0	0	0	0	13	0
Blackburn Rovers	2026–27	Championship	3	0	0	0	1	0	0	0	4	0
Blackburn Rovers	Total		106	0	8	0	7	0	0	0	121	0
Career total			190	0	9	0	8	0	1	0	208	0
