= Scott Wharton =

English footballer

Personal information
- Full name: Scott Bradley Wharton
- Date of birth: 3 October 1997 (age 29)
- Place of birth: Blackburn, England
- Height: 6 ft 2 in (1.87 m)
- Position: Defender

Team information
- Current team: Blackburn Rovers
- Number: 16

Youth career
- 2010–2016: Blackburn Rovers

Senior career*
Years	Team	Apps	(Gls)
2016–	Blackburn Rovers	101	(5)
2017	→ Cambridge United (loan)	9	(1)
2018	→ Lincoln City (loan)	14	(2)
2018–2019	→ Lincoln City (loan)	11	(1)
2019	→ Bury (loan)	15	(2)
2019–2020	→ Northampton Town (loan)	32	(3)
- * Club domestic league appearances and goals as of 22 April 2026 (UTC)

Scott Bradley Wharton (born 3 October 1997) is an English professional footballer who plays as a defender for EFL Championship club Blackburn Rovers.

== Early life ==
Wharton attended Ribblesdale High School, leaving at 16 in 2014.

== Career ==
In October 2015, Wharton signed his first professional contract for two years and six months at Blackburn Rovers. In August 2016, he made his first team debut for Blackburn in the 2–2 draw against Burton Albion. He scored his first goal for Blackburn in a 4–3 EFL Cup win against Crewe Alexandra on 23 August 2016.

Wharton was on loan at Lincoln City through much of 2018 and, as a result, was cup-tied for Lincoln's win in the 2018 EFL Trophy Final. In January 2019, he joined Bury on loan until the end of the 2018–19 season. In July 2019 he joined Northampton Town on loan until the end of the season. Whilst on loan at Northampton Town, He was awarded the PFA Fans' League Two Player of the month award for November 2019.

== Personal life ==
Scott's younger brother, Adam Wharton, is also a professional footballer who plays for Crystal Palace and the England national team.

== Career statistics ==
As of match played 22 April 2026

Appearances and goals by club, season and competition
Club	Season	League			FA Cup		League Cup		Other		Total	
Club	Season	Division	Apps	Goals	Apps	Goals	Apps	Goals	Apps	Goals	Apps	Goals
Blackburn Rovers	2016–17	Championship	2	0	0	0	2	1	3 (Note: Appearances in EFL Trophy with Blackburn's U-23 side.)	0	7	1
Blackburn Rovers	2017–18	League One	0	0	1	0	0	0	1 (Note: Appearances in EFL Trophy)	0	2	0
Blackburn Rovers	2018–19	Championship	0	0	0	0	0	0	0	0	0	0
Blackburn Rovers	2019–20	Championship	0	0	0	0	0	0	0	0	0	0
Blackburn Rovers	2020–21	Championship	7	0	0	0	1	0	0	0	8	0
Blackburn Rovers	2021–22	Championship	30	2	0	0	0	0	0	0	30	2
Blackburn Rovers	2022–23	Championship	22	1	4	0	2	2	0	0	28	3
Blackburn Rovers	2023–24	Championship	28	2	2	0	4	0	0	0	34	2
Blackburn Rovers	2024–25	Championship	0	0	0	0	0	0	0	0	0	0
Blackburn Rovers	2025–26	Championship	12	0	0	0	1	0	0	0	13	0
Blackburn Rovers	2026–27	Championship	0	0	0	0	0	0	0	0	0	0
Blackburn Rovers	Total		101	5	7	0	10	3	4	0	122	8
Cambridge United (loan)	2016–17	League Two	9	1	0	0	0	0	0	0	9	1
Lincoln City (loan)	2017–18	League Two	14	2	0	0	0	0	1	0	15	2
Lincoln City (loan)	2018–19	League Two	11	1	1	0	1	0	3	0	16	1
Bury (loan)	2018–19	League Two	15	2	0	0	0	0	0	0	15	2
Northampton Town (loan)	2019–20	League Two	32	3	4	1	1	0	6 (Note: Three appearances in League Two play-offs)	0	43	4
Career total			182	14	12	1	12	3	14	0	220	18

== Honours ==
Lincoln City

- EFL League Two: 2018–19

Bury

- EFL League Two runner-up: 2018–19

Northampton Town

- EFL League Two play-offs: 2020
