= Tom Bloxham (footballer, born 2005) =

Irish association football player (born 2005)

Personal information
- Full name: Thomas Joel Bloxham
- Date of birth: 30 April 2005 (age 21)
- Place of birth: Welwyn Garden City, England
- Height: 1.77 m (5 ft 10 in)
- Position: Winger

Team information
- Current team: IFK Luleå

Youth career
- 2012–2023: Tottenham Hotspur

Senior career*
Years	Team	Apps	(Gls)
2023–2025	Blackburn Rovers	1	(0)
2024	→ Harrogate Town (loan)	5	(0)
2025–2026	Grasshopper II	8	(2)
2026–	IFK Luleå	0	(0)

International career^{‡}
2020	England U15	1	(0)
2021	England U17	3	(0)
2022	Republic of Ireland U17	2	(0)
2022	Republic of Ireland U18	2	(0)
2023	Republic of Ireland U19	4	(0)
- * Club domestic league appearances and goals as of 22:20, 6 October 2026 (UTC) ‡ National team caps and goals as of 12:00, 23 September 2025 (UTC)

Thomas Joel Bloxham (born 30 April 2005) is a professional footballer who plays as a winger for IFK Luleå. Born in England, he is a youth international for the Republic of Ireland.

== Career ==
Bloxham is a youth product of Tottenham Hotspur since the age of seven, and worked his way up their youth categories. On 20 June 2023, he transferred to Blackburn Rovers on a two-year contract. He made his senior and professional debut with Blackburn Rovers as a substitute in a 8–0 EFL Cup win over Harrogate Town on 30 August 2023, scoring his side's seventh goal. He made his Championship League debut coming on as a substitute in a 3–0 defeat to Plymouth Argyle on 1 September 2023.

On 1 February 2024, Bloxham joined Harrogate Town on loan for the remainder of the 2023–24 season.

On 19 May 2025, it was announced he would be leaving the club upon the expiration of his contract.

On 22 September 2025, he joined the U21 team of Swiss Super League side Grasshopper Club Zurich on a one-year contract.

In August 2026, Bloxham signed for Swedish fourth tier club IFK Luleå.

== International career ==
Born in England, Bloxham is of Irish descent. He formerly played for England, having been called up to the England U15s and England U17s. In 2022, he was called up to the Republic of Ireland U18 side. On 3 September 2023, Bloxham was called up to the Republic of Ireland U19 squad.

== Playing style ==
Bloxham is a left-footed winger, with a low centre of gravity, and likes to cut in from the flank.

== Career statistics ==
As of match played 22 November 2025

Appearances and goals by club, season and competition
Club	Season	League			National Cup (Note: Includes FA Cup & Swedish Cup)		League Cup (Note: Includes EFL Cup & National League Cup)		Other		Total	
Club	Season	Division	Apps	Goals	Apps	Goals	Apps	Goals	Apps	Goals	Apps	Goals
Blackburn Rovers	2023–24	Championship	1	0	0	0	1	1	–		2	1
Blackburn Rovers	2024–25	Championship	0	0	0	0	0	0	–		0	0
Blackburn Rovers	Total		1	0	0	0	1	1	–		2	1
Harrogate Town (loan)	2023–24	League Two	5	0	–		–		–		5	0
Blackburn Rovers U21	2024–25	–					2 (Note: Appearances in the National League Cup)	0	–		2	0
Grasshopper II	2025–26	1. Liga Classic	8	2	–		–		–		8	2
IFK Luleå	2026	Division 2	0	0	0	0	–		–		0	0
Career total			14	2	0	0	3	1	0	0	17	3
