= Jake Garrett =

English footballer

Personal information
- Full name: Jake Joseph Garrett
- Date of birth: 10 March 2003 (age 23)
- Place of birth: Liverpool, England
- Height: 1.88 m (6 ft 2 in)
- Position: Defensive midfielder

Team information
- Current team: Blackburn Rovers
- Number: 30

Youth career
- Liverpool
- Everton
- 2012–2022: Blackburn Rovers

Senior career*
Years	Team	Apps	(Gls)
2022–	Blackburn Rovers	35	(1)
2024–2025	→ Bristol Rovers (loan)	7	(0)
2025	→ Tranmere Rovers (loan)	11	(1)

International career
2017–2018	England U15	4	(0)
2018	England U16	4	(0)
- * Club domestic league appearances and goals as of 16:15, 24 October 2026 (UTC)

Jake Joseph Garrett (born 10 March 2003) is an English professional footballer who plays as a defensive midfielder for EFL Championship club Blackburn Rovers.

== Club career ==
Having played for Merseyside clubs Liverpool and Everton, Garrett joined Blackburn Rovers's academy at the age of nine. He signed his first professional contract in March 2020.

Garrett featured for Blackburn in the 2021–22 pre-season, but was unable to break into the first team that year. He again featured in pre-season in July 2022, and there was interest from clubs to sign him on loan. However, he stayed with Blackburn Rovers, and made his professional debut in an EFL Cup tie against Bradford City in August 2022. He went on to make his Championship debut in October of the same year, in a 2–0 win over Sunderland. Following his league debut, manager Jon Dahl Tomasson praised Garrett for his development since the beginning of the season.

In March 2023, Garrett signed a new four-and-a-half year contract with Rovers, talking of his aims to help the club return to the Premier League.

He scored his first goal for Blackburn in a 4–3 win over Walsall in the EFL Cup on 8 August 2023. He was named as Blackburn's Young Player of the Year for the 2023–24 season.

On 3 August 2024, Garrett joined League One side Bristol Rovers on a season-long loan deal. Having made seven League One appearances during the first half of the season, he was recalled on 3 January 2025. Before the end of the transfer window, he returned out on loan, joining League Two side Tranmere Rovers for the remainder of the season.

== International career ==
Garrett has represented England at under-15 and under-16 level.

== Career statistics ==
As of match played 24 October 2026

Appearances and goals by club, season and competition
Club	Season	League			FA Cup		EFL Cup		Other		Total	
Club	Season	Division	Apps	Goals	Apps	Goals	Apps	Goals	Apps	Goals	Apps	Goals
Blackburn Rovers	2022–23	Championship	8	0	2	0	3	0	—		13	0
Blackburn Rovers	2023–24	Championship	21	1	3	0	4	3	—		28	4
Blackburn Rovers	2024–25	Championship	0	0	0	0	0	0	—		0	0
Blackburn Rovers	2025–26	Championship	0	0	0	0	0	0	—		0	0
Blackburn Rovers	2026–27	Championship	6	0	0	0	2	0	—		8	0
Blackburn Rovers	Total		35	1	5	0	9	3	0	0	49	4
Bristol Rovers (loan)	2024–25	League One	7	0	0	0	1	0	3 (Note: Appearance(s) in EFL Trophy)	0	11	0
Tranmere Rovers (loan)	2024–25	League Two	11	1	—		—		—		11	1
Career total			53	2	5	0	10	3	3	0	71	5

== Honours ==
Individual

- Blackburn Rovers Young Player of the Year: 2023–24
