= John Eustace =

English football coach and player (born 1979)

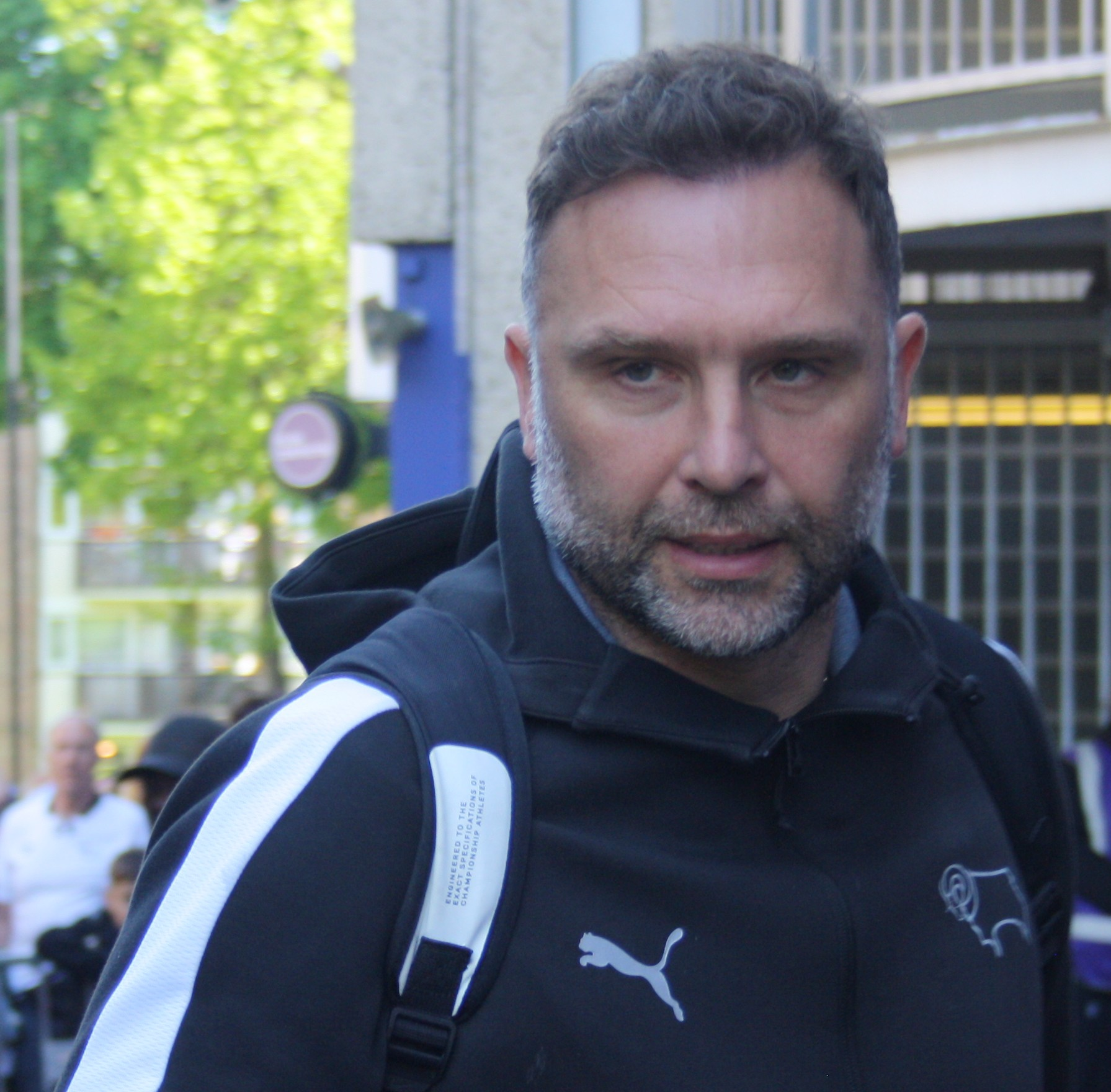
- Eustace in 2026

Personal information
- Full name: John Mark Eustace
- Date of birth: 3 November 1979 (age 47)
- Place of birth: Solihull, England
- Position: Midfielder

Team information
- Current team: Derby County (head coach)

Youth career
- Coventry City

Senior career*
Years	Team	Apps	(Gls)
1996–2003	Coventry City	85	(7)
1998–1999	→ Dundee United (loan)	11	(1)
2003	→ Middlesbrough (loan)	1	(0)
2003–2008	Stoke City	74	(5)
2006	→ Hereford United (loan)	8	(0)
2008–2013	Watford	157	(16)
2009	→ Derby County (loan)	9	(1)
2013–2015	Derby County	48	(2)
Total		393	(32)

Managerial career
- 2016–2018: Kidderminster Harriers
- 2019: Queens Park Rangers (caretaker)
- 2022–2023: Birmingham City
- 2024–2025: Blackburn Rovers
- 2025–: Derby County
- * Club domestic league appearances and goals

John Mark Eustace (born 3 November 1979) is an English professional football coach and former player who is head coach of EFL Championship club Derby County.

During his playing career, he played as a central midfielder for Coventry City, Stoke City, Watford and Derby County. He also spent time on loan at Dundee United, Middlesbrough and Hereford United.

After retiring as a player, Eustace served as manager of Kidderminster Harriers between 2016 and 2018, eventually leaving to become assistant manager of Queens Park Rangers in 2018. He had a brief spell as caretaker manager of QPR in 2019. Eustace served as head coach of Birmingham City between July 2022 to October 2023. He was appointed head coach of Blackburn Rovers in February 2024, before leaving to become Derby County head coach in February 2025.

== Playing career ==
=== Coventry City ===
Born in Solihull, Eustace began his career as a trainee at Coventry City. Despite the fact that he was at the club for seven years, he only recorded 98 appearances in all competitions due to injuries. At 19 he went out on loan to Dundee United to gain first team experience. He played eleven matches and scored one goal against Hearts, becoming popular with United fans who voted him their young player of the year.

He returned to Coventry where he began to establish himself in the first team. In the 2000–01 season, he appeared in 32 league games. Despite his efforts, the club were relegated from the Premier League. At the start of the next season, he was named as captain by manager Gordon Strachan. However, on 8 September 2001, Eustace suffered a knee injury during Coventry's league defeat to Grimsby which kept him sidelined for seven months. He returned to action in April 2002.

Eustace started the 2002–03 season well and attracted interest from Premier League club Middlesbrough, to whom he was loaned out for one month in January 2003. He only made one substitute appearance, away to Liverpool, where he appeared for only the final two minutes of the game, but earned himself a yellow card. Eustace made 33 league appearances over the season, his last with Coventry.

=== Stoke City ===
At the start of the 2003–04 season, Eustace left Coventry for fellow second-tier team Stoke City on a free transfer. He made his debut in a 3–0 win over Derby County at the start of the 2003–04 season and helped the side to 11th place in the Championship, scoring five goals. Injury problems restricted him to a handful of appearances over the next two seasons – in the Potters' 1–0 win over Wigan Athletic in February 2005, Eustace suffered a serious knee injury and was then substituted, in only his 8th appearance of the season. He missed the rest of the 2004–05 season and all of the 2005–06 season because of the injury. However, Eustace signed a one-year contract extension at the beginning of the season, which lasted until the end of the 2006–07 season.

Eustace returned from his long injury lay off in June 2006. He made his first appearance for Stoke City in over 18 months in their 2–0 friendly win over local opposition Newcastle Town. On 13 October 2006, Eustace joined Hereford United on loan to gain first team football to aid his comeback. During his time at Edgar Street he was a key part of the Hereford midfield, and his loan was extended to the New Year. However, on 14 December 2006 he was suddenly recalled by Stoke due to them suffering several injuries in midfield. John's grandfather Ken Eustace also played one match for Hereford during the 1949–50 season.

Eustace returned to the Stoke starting line up in the 3rd round FA Cup match against Millwall. On 11 February 2007, he started his first league match of the season in Stoke's 1–0 loss to Birmingham City. In total, Eustace made 23 league appearances over the course of the season for Stoke and Hereford. Eustace later signed a one-year contract extension with the club, to take him up until the summer of 2008. He was a regular for Stoke during the first half of the 2007–08 season and captained the team up until his move to Watford on the last day of the transfer window.

=== Watford ===
On 31 January 2008, Eustace joined Watford from Stoke City for a fee of £250,000. On 20 September 2008, Eustace "scored" a bizarre opening own goal in the game between Watford and Reading, where a goalmouth scramble saw the ball go nowhere near the goal line, despite the linesman flagging for a goal to the bemusement of everyone in the ground. A corner from Stephen Hunt bounced off of Eustace and was hooked back by Noel Hunt. What could have been a debatable corner for Reading, initially given as a goal kick, was actually then given as a goal. The game ended Watford 2–2 Reading.

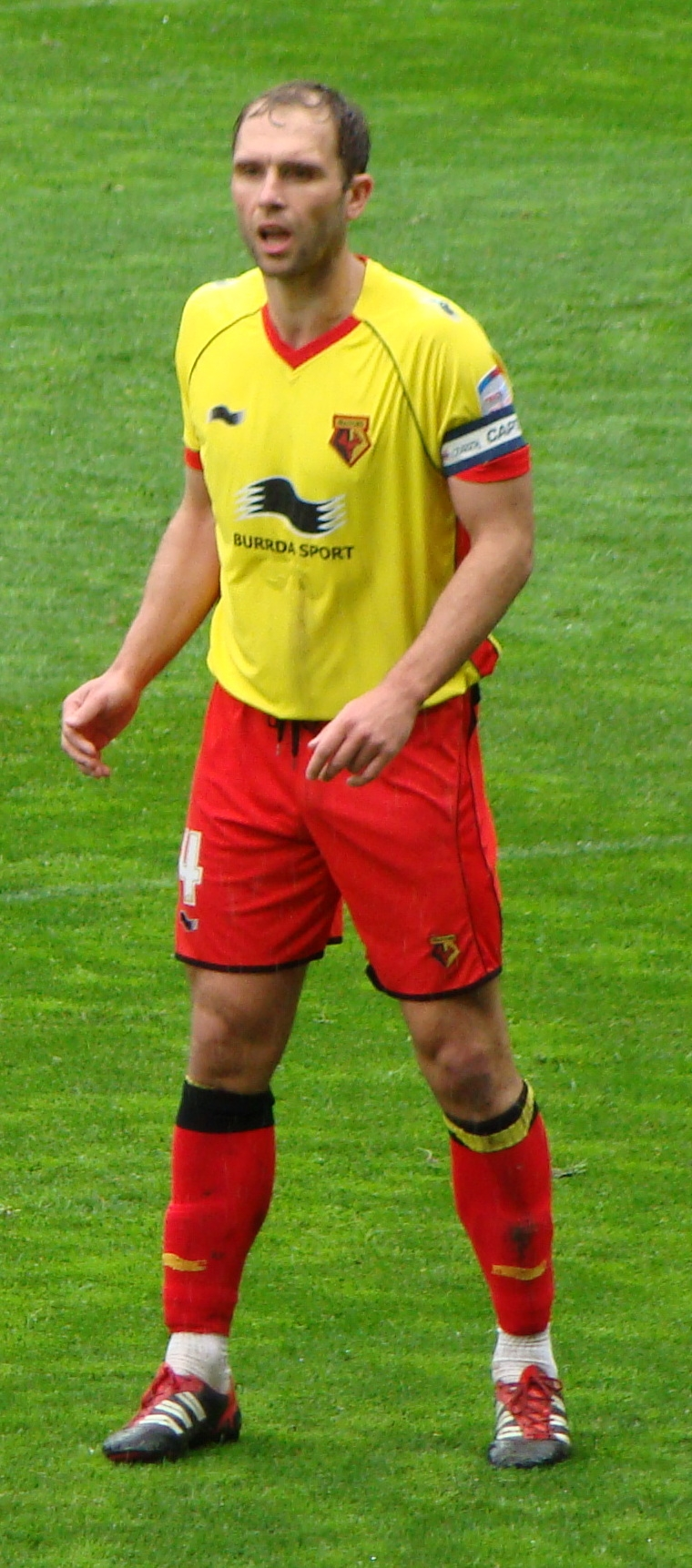
Eustace playing for Watford in 2012

On 9 March 2009, he joined Championship rivals Derby County on loan until the end of the 2008–09 season, in order to help solve the Rams' midfield injury crisis. He made his Derby debut in the 1–1 draw away to Southampton, and scored against his parent club on the final day of the season. Eustace was unable to secure a permanent move to Derby at the end of his loan spell with the club and returned to Watford at the beginning of May. However, Derby manager Nigel Clough said "He's got a year left at Watford. If he's still in the same situation at the start of next season, needing a loan, then we might look at that."

With his Hornets career seemingly in jeopardy, Eustace signed an amended contract stipulating that he would not receive his sizeable appearance fee, freeing up Malky Mackay to pick the tenacious midfielder. Eustace went on to play a key role as Watford retained their Championship status for another season. He was also given the captaincy on a number of occasions with first-choice skipper Jay DeMerit sidelined through injury. Eustace made over forty appearances in league and cup competitions and was the 'Player's Player of the Season' as voted by his peers.

After much speculation throughout the 2009–10 off-season, Eustace finally signed a new two-year contract with Watford. Eustace and Mackay later revealed that he had passed a medical at Leeds United, and that there was interest from other clubs.

Ahead of the season, Mackay handed Eustace the captaincy, after DeMerit was released on a Bosman transfer. He started the season in good form, scoring Watford's first goal of the season in a 3–2 win at Norwich City, followed a week later with an over-head finish in a 2–2 draw against former club Coventry which was later named as the 2010–11 goal of the season. Eustace kept the captain's armband following the managerial appointment of Sean Dyche in June 2011 and signed a new two-year contract until 2013 at the end of July despite interest from Derby County.

In June 2013, Eustace was offered a new contract with a player/coach role, which he declined, stating that he was not ready to turn away from playing just yet, therefore leaving the club as a free agent.

=== Derby County ===
In July 2013, it was confirmed by Derby County that Eustace had rejoined the club on trial, with a view to earning a contract and after impressing Nigel Clough in pre-season training and friendly games, Eustace verbally agreed a one-year contract with Derby and the move was made official on 24 July. According to Clough, Eustace was signed to act as cover in his natural central midfield position as well as being an emergency central defender. Eustace came on as a late substitute for Will Hughes in Derby's opening game against Blackburn Rovers. His first Derby start was in the 1–0 League Cup win at Oldham Athletic. He scored the first goal of his second spell at Derby with a looping header against Queens Park Rangers on 10 February 2014, at Pride Park.

Eustace suffered a serious knee cartilage injury against Ipswich Town in a 1–0 victory on 10 January 2015. His manager Steve McClaren described Eustace's injury as a 'big blow'. A focal point in defensive central midfield, Eustace had only been on the losing side once in 14 appearances prior to his injury for Derby during the 2014–15 season. The injury required an operation and ruled him out for the remainder of the season. Eustace was released by Derby in June 2015.

On 22 June 2015, Eustace was linked with a move to Scottish club Rangers, with newly appointed manager Mark Warburton stating: "People like John Eustace are few and far between, people like John are ultra-professional on and off the pitch. They are great role models." Despite the link to Rangers, Eustace retired from playing due to his injury.

== Coaching career ==
=== Early career ===
Following his retirement as a player, Eustace moved into coaching. On 21 April 2016, he was named manager of National League side Kidderminster Harriers on a one-year contract for the 2016–17 season. While at the club, Eustace transformed the side's style of play, with the Harriers being dubbed the "non-league Barcelona". Eustace led his side to the play-offs in two seasons, as well as the First Round Proper of the FA Cup.

He left the club on 25 May 2018 to join former manager Steve McClaren at Queens Park Rangers as assistant manager. At QPR, he had a brief spell as caretaker manager in 2019, helping the club avoid relegation from the Championship with 7 points from his 7 games in charge. Following Mark Warburton's arrival as manager in May 2019, Eustace remained as his assistant and began studying for his UEFA Pro Licence. In March 2022, he joined the Republic of Ireland national team in the same capacity, working under Stephen Kenny, combining this with his existing role at QPR. Eustace, along with Matt Gardiner, left his role at QPR in June 2022, following the appointment of new manager Michael Beale.

=== Birmingham City ===
Eustace succeeded Lee Bowyer as head coach of Championship club Birmingham City on 3 July 2022. His first managerial role in the football league, he signed a three-year contract. Eustace's first competitive game in charge was a 0–0 draw away to Luton Town. Eustace gained his first victory as Birmingham manager in the following match day, defeating Huddersfield Town at home on 5 August 2022. Eustace was able to guide the club to its highest points tally since 2016, successfully avoiding relegation.

On 9 October 2023, Eustace was dismissed by Birmingham. The club cited the importance of the board of directors and management being fully aligned on the culture of the football club as the reason behind the decision. Following Eustace's dismissal, the club rapidly declined and fell to 20th by the end of the calendar year, which was succeeded by relegation to League One at the end of the season, with his replacement Wayne Rooney being dismissed after just fifteen matches.

=== Blackburn Rovers ===
On 9 February 2024, Eustace was appointed head coach of Championship club Blackburn Rovers on a two-and-a-half-year deal. Eustace helped the club avoid relegation in the 2023–24 season and left Blackburn in February 2025 with the club in the play-off places after two-thirds of the 2024–25 season.

=== Derby County ===
Derby County announced that Eustace had been appointed as head coach on 13 February 2025 until the summer of 2028. When Eustace joined, Derby were only out of the relegation zone in the Championship on goal difference, with Eustace admitting in his press conference the risk of leaving a battle for a play-off place at Blackburn to join a relegation battle at his new club, but he felt the Derby job was a better long-term prospect. He also said he had more conversations with the Derby owner David Clowes than with previous ownership groups combined at Birmingham and Blackburn. Eustace's first game in charge of Derby ended in a 4–0 defeat to Queens Park Rangers on 14 February 2025, a result which dropped Derby into the relegation zone on goal difference. After three defeats in his first three matches as head coach, Eustace secured his first victory at home to former club Blackburn Rovers. This win was followed by successive victories against Coventry City and Plymouth Argyle to move Derby within one point of safety. A 2–0 victory over Preston North End on 2 April 2025 extended this winning run to four. In the last seven games of the season, Derby won two matches, drew three and lost two as the club were able to secure survival in the Championship on the final day of the season, finishing 19th in the league, three places and one point above the relegation zone.

Derby made 13 new signings in the summer transfer window for the 2025–26 season, as Derby started the first month of league action winless, picking up two draws in their first four Championship matches. In Derby's first ten league matches of the season, they had won one match, drew four and lost five, with Eustace being disappointed with Derby's lack of aggression in 1–0 loss over Oxford United in October. After this match, Derby went on five-match winning run. Eustace was nominated for Championship Manager of the month in November. Derby's results in the first half of the season were stronger away from home. This strong away form was highlighted on 30 January 2026, with Derby winning 5–0 at Ashton Gate against Bristol City, the first time Derby won by five goals away from home since 12 September 1959. Improved home form, including a run with six consecutive home wins left Derby with a chance to secure a top 6 play-off place in the final game of the season, with Derby being one point behind 6th place. On the final day of the season a win for Hull City ended the possibility of a play-off place and defeat for Derby County, left Eustace's side in 8th place on 69 points, four points and two places behind the play-off places, Eustace said he was proud of the improvement the club had made compared to the previous season.

In the run up to the 2026–27 season, there was repeated speculation about potential investment and later a takeover of the club by Saudi government official Turki Al-Sheikh, however this takeover collapsed in August 2026 just as it was set to be announced, with current owner David Clowes then taking the club "off the market" after the deal broke down. Eustace said the speculation had delayed his squad rebuilding but was thankful for support from Clowes and for the speculation to end, after a frustrating pre-season which also saw a first round EFL Cup exit to Lincoln City on the eve of his second full season in charge at Pride Park.

== Career statistics ==
Appearances and goals by club, season and competition
Club	Season	League			National cup		League cup		Other		Total	
Club	Season	Division	Apps	Goals	Apps	Goals	Apps	Goals	Apps	Goals	Apps	Goals
Coventry City	1998–99	Premier League	0	0	0	0	0	0	—		0	0
Coventry City	1999–2000	Premier League	16	1	3	1	2	0	—		21	2
Coventry City	2000–01	Premier League	31	2	1	0	4	2	—		36	4
Coventry City	2001–02	First Division	6	0	0	0	0	0	—		6	0
Coventry City	2002–03	First Division	32	4	1	0	2	0	—		35	4
Coventry City	Total		85	7	5	1	8	2	—		98	10
Dundee United (loan)	1998–99	Scottish Premier League	11	1	2	0	0	0	—		13	1
Middlesbrough (loan)	2002–03	Premier League	1	0	0	0	0	0	—		1	0
Stoke City	2003–04	First Division	26	5	2	1	2	0	—		30	6
Stoke City	2004–05	Championship	7	0	1	0	0	0	—		8	0
Stoke City	2005–06	Championship	0	0	0	0	0	0	—		0	0
Stoke City	2006–07	Championship	15	0	1	0	1	0	—		17	0
Stoke City	2007–08	Championship	26	0	2	0	1	0	—		29	0
Stoke City	Total		74	5	6	1	4	0	—		84	6
Hereford United (loan)	2006–07	League Two	8	0	0	0	0	0	0	0	8	0
Watford	2007–08	Championship	13	0	0	0	0	0	2 (Note: Appearances in Championship play-offs)	0	15	0
Watford	2008–09	Championship	17	2	0	0	0	0	—		17	2
Watford	2009–10	Championship	42	4	1	0	2	0	—		45	4
Watford	2010–11	Championship	41	6	0	0	1	0	—		42	6
Watford	2011–12	Championship	39	4	2	0	1	0	—		42	4
Watford	2012–13	Championship	5	0	1	0	1	0	0	0	7	0
Watford	Total		157	16	4	0	5	0	2	0	168	16
Derby County (loan)	2008–09	Championship	9	1	0	0	0	0	—		9	1
Derby County	2013–14	Championship	35	1	1	0	2	0	1	0	39	1
Derby County	2014–15	Championship	13	1	0	0	1	0	—		14	1
Derby County	Total		57	3	1	0	3	0	1	0	62	3
Career total			393	32	18	2	20	2	3	0	434	36

== Managerial statistics ==
As of match played 21 November 2026

Managerial record by team and tenure
Team	From	To	Record					Ref.
Team	From	To	P	W	D	L	Win %	Ref.
Kidderminster Harriers	1 June 2016 (Note: Eustace's Kidderminster appointment was announced on 21 April 2016 but he did not take charge of the team for what remained of the 2015–16 season.)	25 May 2018	104	57	21	26	54.8	
Queens Park Rangers (caretaker)	1 April 2019	8 May 2019	7	2	1	4	28.6	
Birmingham City	3 July 2022	9 October 2023	63	21	16	26	33.3	
Blackburn Rovers	11 February 2024 (Note: Eustace's Blackburn appointment was announced on 9 February, but first-team coaches David Lowe and Damien Johnson took charge of the following day's match.)	13 February 2025 (Note: Soccerbase include the win against West Bromwich Albion on 12 February 2025, the day before Eustace formally left Blackburn, which was taken by Lowe.)	52	18	15	19	34.6	
Derby County	13 February 2025	Present	80	28	17	35	35.0	
Total			306	126	70	110	41.2	
