= Adam Wharton =

English footballer (born 2004)

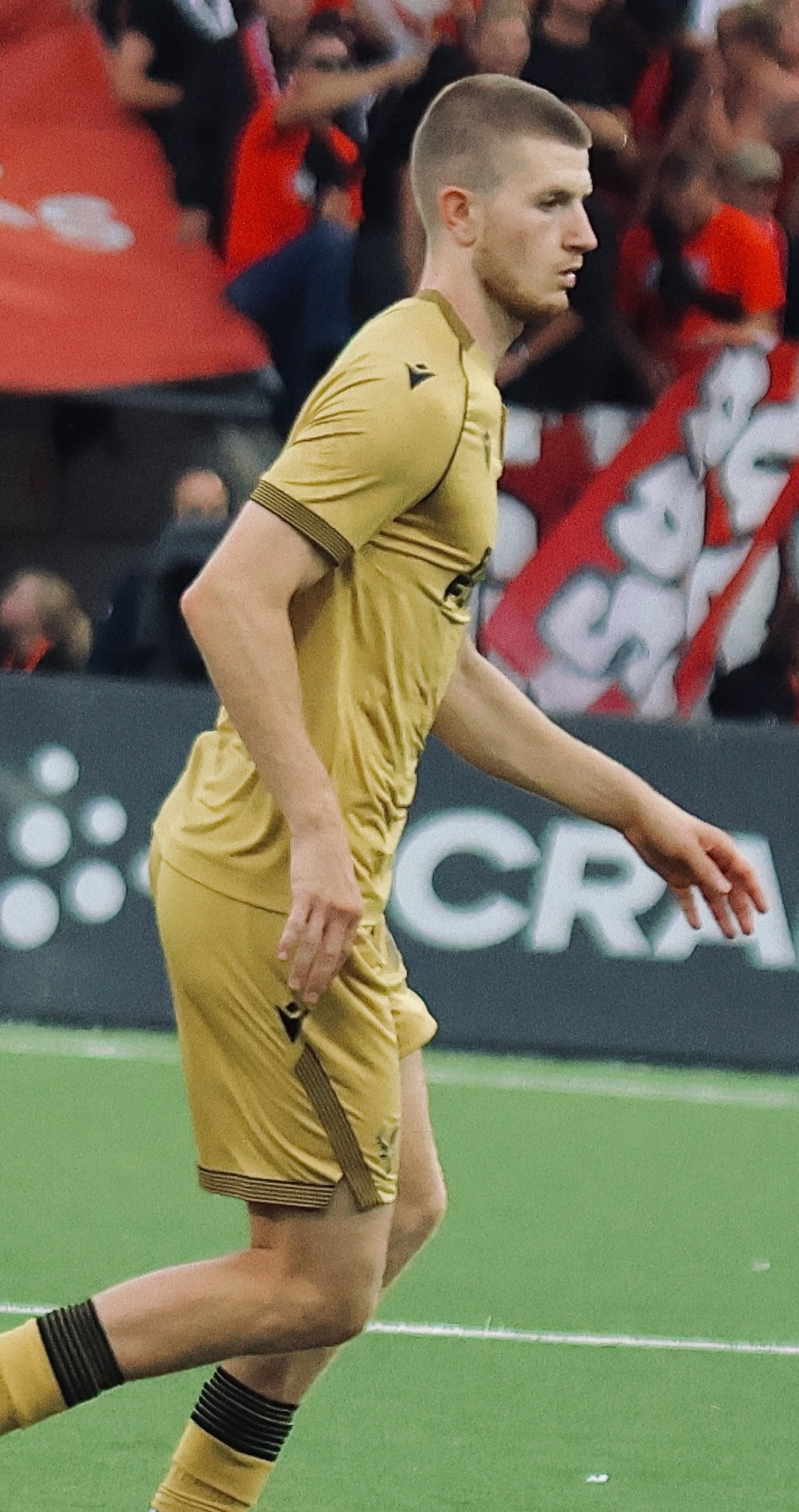
- Wharton in 2025

Personal information
- Full name: Adam James Wharton
- Date of birth: 6 February 2004 (age 22)
- Place of birth: Blackburn, Lancashire, England
- Height: 6 ft 0 in (1.82 m)
- Position: Central midfielder

Team information
- Current team: Crystal Palace
- Number: 20

Youth career
- 2010–2022: Blackburn Rovers

Senior career*
Years	Team	Apps	(Gls)
2022–2024	Blackburn Rovers	44	(4)
2024–	Crystal Palace	80	(1)

International career^{‡}
2022–2023	England U19	6	(0)
2023	England U20	3	(0)
2024–	England U21	3	(0)
2024–	England	4	(0)
Medal record
Men's football
Representing England
UEFA European Championship
Runner-up	2024 Germany	Team
- * Club domestic league appearances and goals as of 19:30, 8 November 2026 (UTC) ‡ National team caps and goals as of 23:03, 27 March 2026 (UTC)

Adam James Wharton (born 6 February 2004) is an English professional footballer who plays as a central midfielder for Premier League club Crystal Palace and the England national team.

A Blackburn Rovers Academy graduate, Wharton made his senior debut in the EFL Championship in 2022. He was signed by Crystal Palace in 2024, where he won the FA Cup, the club's first ever major trophy, in his first full season in 2025. The following year, he won the Community Shield and the UEFA Conference League, being named man of the match in the final.

Wharton made his senior debut for England in June 2024, and was included in the squad for UEFA Euro 2024.

== Club career ==
=== Blackburn Rovers ===
Wharton supported Blackburn Rovers as a young child and aged four, in 2008, he was club mascot for a Blackburn game against Chelsea. Two years later, he joined the Blackburn Academy.

In February 2022, Wharton signed his first professional contract at Blackburn, a two-and-a-half-year deal with an option through to 2025.

On 10 August 2022, Wharton made his professional debut after being named in the starting XI for a 4–0 EFL Cup first round victory at Ewood Park against Hartlepool United.

On 27 August 2022, Wharton made his league debut against Stoke City coming off the bench at half time for Joe Rankin-Costello. On 31 August 2022, Wharton made his full 90 minutes league debut against Blackpool, winning player of the match. On 22 October 2022, Wharton scored his first goal for the club during a victory over Birmingham City.

=== Crystal Palace ===
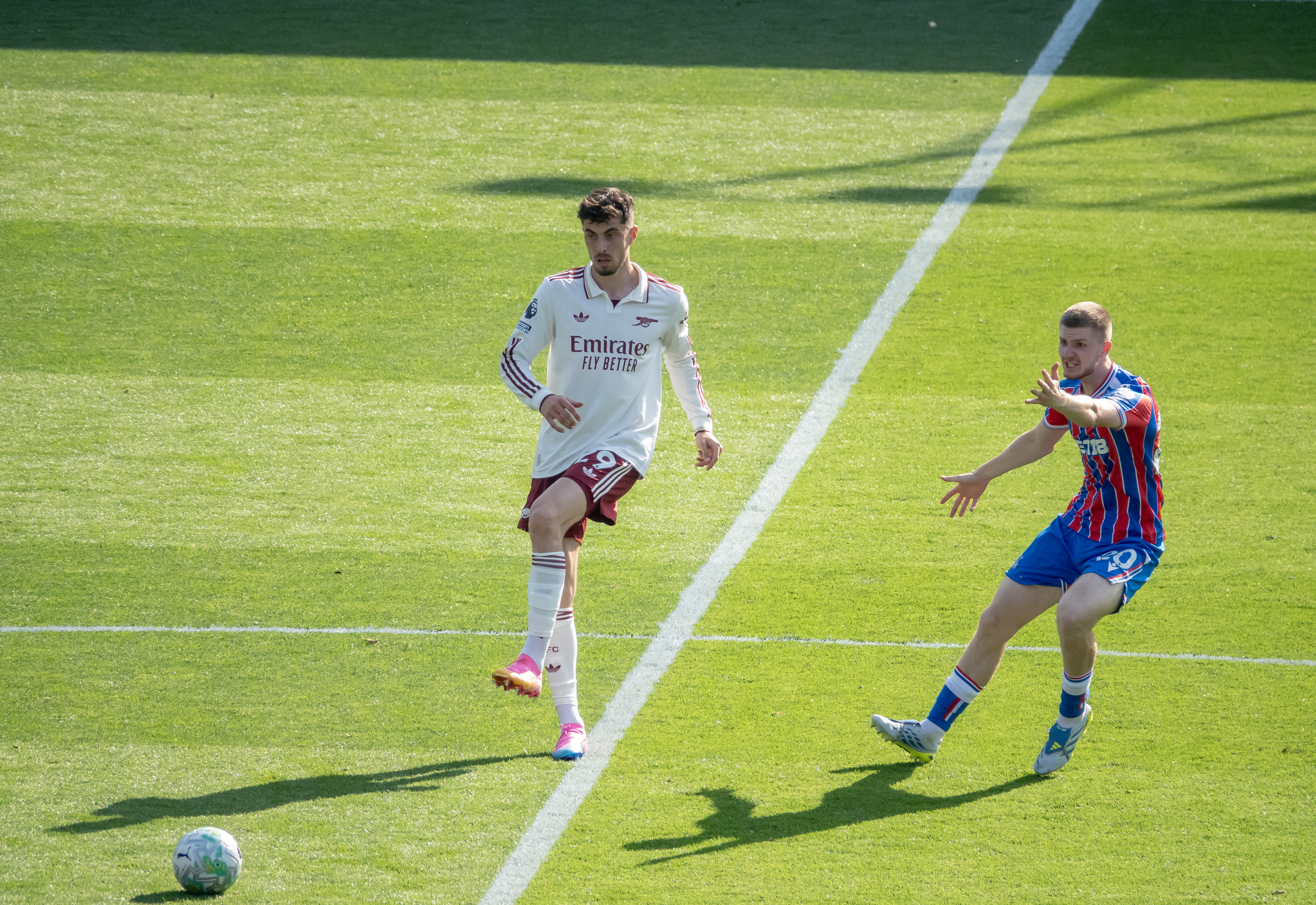
Wharton playing against Arsenal in 2026

On 1 February 2024, Premier League side Crystal Palace announced the signing of Wharton on a five-and-a-half-year contract. The fee was undisclosed by the club, but reported to be an initial fee of £18 million, which could potentially rise to £22 million. He made his first appearance for the club two days later, coming off the bench against rivals Brighton & Hove Albion in a 4–1 defeat. Wharton started all 15 of Crystal Palace's remaining league fixtures that season.

In October 2024, Wharton suffered a groin injury that required surgery and kept him sidelined for three months. On 17 May 2025, Wharton started in the FA Cup final against Manchester City, helping his side to a 1–0 victory that secured Palace's first ever major trophy.

Wharton started in the 2025 FA Community Shield against Liverpool on 10 August 2025 as Palace won on penalties following a 2–2 draw. On 5 March 2026, he assisted twice in a 3–1 victory at Tottenham Hotspur; his second assist, a clipped pass to Ismaïla Sarr, was praised by pundits as "beautiful" and "superb", and later was awarded the Premier League Creative Moment of the Month. On 17 May, he scored his first goal for the club in a 2–2 away draw against Brentford. He started in the 2026 UEFA Conference League final on 28 May, playing all 90 minutes as Palace won 1–0 against Rayo Vallecano, and was awarded man of the match for his performance, having set up several big chances, including Jean-Philippe Mateta's winning goal.

== International career ==
On 16 September 2022, Wharton along with Blackburn teammate Ashley Phillips was called up to the England under-19 squad. Wharton made his debut in a 2–0 win against Montenegro. On 31 August 2023, Wharton was included in England under-20 training camp squad. On 16 November, he made his U20 debut during a 3–0 defeat to Italy at the Eco-Power Stadium. On 25 March 2024, he received his first call up for the England under-21 team for a Euro qualifying match, and made his debut the following day, coming on as a substitute in a 7–0 win over Luxembourg.

On 21 May 2024, Wharton received his first senior call up as part of the 33-player preliminary squad for UEFA Euro 2024. He made his England debut, as a substitute on 3 June during a 3–0 win against Bosnia and Herzegovina. On 6 June, he was named in the final 26-man squad for the tournament, where he remained an unused substitute.

Wharton made his first start for England on 16 November 2025 in a 2026 FIFA World Cup qualifying match against Albania. He was left out of the final 26-man squad for the 2026 FIFA World Cup, and was considered by many a surprise omission.

== Style of play ==
Wharton's intelligence and technical ability is a notable characteristic of his playing style. The head of Blackburn Rovers Academy, Stuart Jones, told BBC Radio 5 Live: "In terms of his attributes, he was always an outstanding footballer, his ability on the football, his football intelligence and game understanding, he sees things that possibly other players don't see and he's always shown that from a young age." Following his England debut, Gareth Southgate commented on his ability to receive the ball.

== Personal life ==
Adam is the younger brother of Scott Wharton, a professional footballer at Blackburn. Wharton was privately educated at Moorland School in Lancashire.

== Career statistics ==
=== Club ===
As of match played 8 November 2026

Appearances and goals by club, season and competition
Club	Season	League			FA Cup		EFL Cup		Europe		Other		Total	
Club	Season	Division	Apps	Goals	Apps	Goals	Apps	Goals	Apps	Goals	Apps	Goals	Apps	Goals
Blackburn Rovers	2022–23	Championship	18	2	0	0	4	0	—		—		22	2
Blackburn Rovers	2023–24	Championship	26	2	1	0	2	0	—		—		29	2
Blackburn Rovers	Total		44	4	1	0	6	0	—		—		51	4
Crystal Palace	2023–24	Premier League	16	0	—		—		—		—		16	0
Crystal Palace	2024–25	Premier League	20	0	5	0	2	0	—		—		27	0
Crystal Palace	2025–26	Premier League	34	1	1	0	1	0	16 (Note: Appearances in UEFA Conference League)	0	1 (Note: Appearance in FA Community Shield)	0	53	1
Crystal Palace	2026–27	Premier League	10	0	0	0	2	0	4 (Note: Appearances in UEFA Europa League)	0	—		16	0
Crystal Palace	Total		80	1	6	0	5	0	20	0	1	0	112	1
Career total			124	5	7	0	11	0	20	0	1	0	163	5

=== International ===
As of match played 27 March 2026

Appearances and goals by national team and year
National team	Year	Apps	Goals
England	2024	1	0
England	2025	2	0
England	2026	1	0
Total		4	0

== Honours ==
Crystal Palace

- FA Cup: 2024–25
- FA Community Shield: 2025
- UEFA Conference League: 2025–26

England

- UEFA European Championship runner-up: 2024

Individual

- UEFA Conference League Team of the Season: 2025–26
