= Andrew Moran =

Irish footballer (born 2003)

- Moran with Preston North End in 2026.

Personal information
- Full name: Andrew Moran
- Date of birth: 15 October 2003 (age 23)
- Place of birth: Knocklyon, Dublin, Ireland
- Height: 1.77 m (5 ft 10 in)
- Position: Midfielder

Team information
- Current team: Preston North End
- Number: 23

Youth career
- Knocklyon United
- St Joseph's Boys
- Bray Wanderers
- 2020–2023: Brighton & Hove Albion

Senior career*
| Years | Team | Apps | (Gls) |
| 2019–2020 | Bray Wanderers | 3 | (1) |
| 2021–2026 | Brighton & Hove Albion | 1 | (0) |
| 2023–2024 | → Blackburn Rovers (loan) | 35 | (2) |
| 2024–2025 | → Stoke City (loan) | 35 | (4) |
| 2025 | → Los Angeles FC (loan) | 8 | (1) |
| 2026– | Preston North End | 11 | (1) |

International career^{‡}
- Republic of Ireland U15
- Republic of Ireland U16
- Republic of Ireland U17
| 2021–2022 | Republic of Ireland U19 | 5 | (1) |
| 2021–2024 | Republic of Ireland U21 | 15 | (5) |
| 2023– | Republic of Ireland | 4 | (0) |
- * Club domestic league appearances and goals as of 16:16, 2 May 2026 (UTC) ‡ National team caps and goals as of 19:18, 16 May 2026 (UTC)

Andrew Moran (born 15 October 2003) is an Irish professional footballer who plays as a midfielder for EFL Championship club Preston North End and the Republic of Ireland national team.

== Club career ==
=== Early career ===
Moran was born in the Dublin suburb of Knocklyon, and started out at his local club Knocklyon United. He later moved to schoolboy club St Joseph's Boys, before moving onto the academy of League of Ireland club Bray Wanderers, for whom St Joseph's are a feeder club.

=== Bray Wanderers ===
Moran made his first team debut for the club in a victory over Drogheda United in August 2019 aged just 15 years 307 days old, making him the youngest player in the club's history. On 28 February 2020, he became the club's youngest ever goalscorer at 16 years 135 days old when he scored in a 2–0 win over Wexford at the Carlisle Grounds.

=== Brighton & Hove Albion ===
In July 2020, Moran signed for the academy of Premier League outfit Brighton & Hove Albion, alongside Bray Wanderers teammate Leigh Kavanagh. April 2021 saw Moran linked with a move to fellow Premier League sides Manchester United and Chelsea. After a year at the club, he signed his first professional contract with Brighton in July 2021. On 24 August 2021, Moran made his first team debut for the club, coming off the bench in the 67th minute of a 2–0 win away over Championship side Cardiff City in the EFL Cup second round.

Moran signed a three-year contract extension with the club in August 2022. On 6 September, Moran scored his first professional goal in England whilst playing for the Brighton under-21s, scoring the opener in the 2–1 loss at League Two side Colchester United in Albion's first group stage match of the 2022–23 EFL Trophy. He made his Premier League debut on 3 January 2023, coming on as a 79th-minute substitute replacing Solly March in a 4–1 away win over Everton. On 22 August 2023, Moran scored a brace with the under-21s in a 3–2 away win over League Two side Walsall in the opening group stage match of the 2023–24 EFL Trophy.

==== Blackburn Rovers loan ====
Moran signed for EFL Championship side Blackburn Rovers on a season-long loan on 26 August 2023. He made his debut a day later, coming on as a 57th-minute substitute in a 1–0 away win over Watford. Moran started in the next match on 30 August, where he assisted John Buckley's goal, in Blackburn's 8–0 away win over League Two side Harrogate Town in the EFL Cup second round.

==== Stoke City loan ====
Moran joined Stoke City on 16 August 2024 on loan for the 2024–25 season. Moran made 39 appearances for Stoke scoring four goals, as they finished in 18th position, avoiding relegation on the final day of the season.

==== Los Angeles FC loan ====
Moran joined Major League Soccer club Los Angeles FC on 21 August 2025 on loan for the remainder of the 2025 season. On 18 October 2025, Moran scored his first goal for the club, a 90th-minute equaliser in a 2–2 draw away to Colorado Rapids.

==== Preston North End ====
On 2 February 2026, Preston announced the club had signed the player on a three-and-a-half year deal.

== International career ==
Moran has captained the Republic of Ireland under-15s and has also represented his country at under-16, under-17, under-19 and under-21 level. On 27 August 2021, he was called up alongside Brighton & Hove Albion team-mate Evan Ferguson to the Republic of Ireland U21s for the first time, for their 2023 UEFA European Under-21 Championship qualifiers against Bosnia and Herzegovina and Luxembourg. He made his Ireland under-21 debut in a 1–1 draw with Luxembourg at the Stade Jos Nosbaum in Dudelange on 7 September 2021.

Moran's first international goal came on 29 March 2022 in the Republic of Ireland U19s 4–0 win over Armenia U19s in the 2022 UEFA European Under-19 Championship qualifying Elite round. Moran scored his first goal for the Republic of Ireland U21s on 16 June 2023 in a 2–2 draw with Ukraine U21s in a friendly played in Austria.

On 21 November 2023, Moran made his senior debut for the Republic of Ireland, replacing Mikey Johnston from the bench in a 1–1 draw with New Zealand in a friendly at the Aviva Stadium.

== Career statistics ==
=== Club ===
As of match played 8 August 2026

Appearances and goals by club, season and competition
| Club | Season | League | | | National Cup (Note: Includes FAI Cup & FA Cup) | | League Cup (Note: Includes League of Ireland Cup & EFL Cup) | | Other | | Total | |
| Club | Season | Division | Apps | Goals | Apps | Goals | Apps | Goals | Apps | Goals | Apps | Goals |
|---|---|---|---|---|---|---|---|---|---|---|---|---|
| Bray Wanderers | 2019 | League of Ireland First Division | 2 | 0 | 0 | 0 | 0 | 0 | 0 (Note: Appearances in Leinster Senior Cup) | 0 | 2 | 0 |
| Bray Wanderers | 2020 | League of Ireland First Division | 1 | 1 | 0 | 0 | 0 | 0 | — | | 1 | 1 |
| Bray Wanderers | Total | | 3 | 1 | 0 | 0 | 0 | 0 | 0 | 0 | 3 | 1 |
| Brighton & Hove Albion U21s | 2021–22 | — | | | | | | | 2 (Note: Appearances in EFL Trophy) | 0 | 2 | 0 |
| Brighton & Hove Albion U21s | 2022–23 | — | | | | | | | 2 | 1 | 2 | 1 |
| Brighton & Hove Albion U21s | 2023–24 | — | | | | | | | 1 | 2 | 1 | 2 |
| Brighton & Hove Albion U21s | Total | — | | | | | | | 5 | 3 | 5 | 3 |
| Brighton & Hove Albion | 2021–22 | Premier League | 0 | 0 | 0 | 0 | 1 | 0 | — | | 1 | 0 |
| Brighton & Hove Albion | 2022–23 | Premier League | 1 | 0 | 0 | 0 | 1 | 0 | — | | 2 | 0 |
| Brighton & Hove Albion | 2023–24 | Premier League | 0 | 0 | 0 | 0 | 0 | 0 | 0 | 0 | 0 | 0 |
| Brighton & Hove Albion | 2024–25 | Premier League | 0 | 0 | 0 | 0 | 0 | 0 | — | | 0 | 0 |
| Brighton & Hove Albion | 2025–26 | Premier League | 0 | 0 | 0 | 0 | 0 | 0 | — | | 0 | 0 |
| Brighton & Hove Albion | Total | | 1 | 0 | 0 | 0 | 2 | 0 | 0 | 0 | 3 | 0 |
| Blackburn Rovers (loan) | 2023–24 | Championship | 35 | 2 | 3 | 0 | 2 | 2 | — | | 40 | 4 |
| Stoke City (loan) | 2024–25 | Championship | 35 | 4 | 1 | 0 | 3 | 0 | — | | 39 | 4 |
| Los Angeles FC (loan) | 2025 | Major League Soccer | 8 | 1 | — | | — | | 2 (Note: Two appearances in MLS Cup playoffs) | 0 | 10 | 1 |
| Preston North End | 2025–26 | Championship | 11 | 1 | — | | — | | — | | 11 | 1 |
| Preston North End | 2026–27 | Championship | 0 | 0 | 0 | 0 | 1 | 0 | 0 | 0 | 1 | 0 |
| Preston North End | Total | | 11 | 1 | 0 | 0 | 1 | 0 | 0 | 0 | 12 | 1 |
| Career total | | | 93 | 9 | 4 | 0 | 7 | 2 | 7 | 3 | 111 | 14 |

=== International ===
As of match played 16 May 2026

Appearances and goals by national team and year
| National team | Year | Apps | Goals |
|---|---|---|---|
Republic of Ireland
| Republic of Ireland | 2023 | 1 | 0 |
| Republic of Ireland | 2024 | 1 | 0 |
| Republic of Ireland | 2025 | 1 | 0 |
| Republic of Ireland | 2026 | 1 | 0 |
| Total | | 4 | 0 |
