= Matthew Gardiner (footballer) =

English footballer (born 1974)

Personal information
- Full name: Matthew Gardiner
- Date of birth: 28 March 1974 (age 52)
- Place of birth: Birmingham, England
- Position: Full back

Team information
- Current team: Derby County (assistant head coach)

Youth career
- 1992: Torquay United

Senior career*
Years	Team	Apps	(Gls)
1992–1993	Torquay United	7	(0)
1993–1995	Shrewsbury Town	0	(0)
2000–2001	Hereford United		
2001	Worcester City	4	(0)
2001	Hereford United		
2001–2002	Hednesford Town		
2002	Evesham United		
2003–2005	Redditch United		
- Worcester City
- Bromsgrove Rovers

Managerial career
- 2010–2011: Redditch United
- 2011–2016: Worcester City (assistant)
- 2016–2018: Kidderminster Harriers (head of coaching)
- 2018–2022: Queens Park Rangers (assistant coach)
- 2022–2023: Birmingham City (joint assistant head coach)
- 2024–2025: Blackburn Rovers (assistant head coach)
- 2025–: Derby County (assistant head coach)
- * Club domestic league appearances and goals

Matthew Gardiner (born 28 March 1974) is an English former professional footballer.

== Playing career ==
Gardiner was born in Birmingham and began his career as an apprentice with Torquay United, turning professional in July 1992. He made his league debut in September the same year, coming on as a substitute for Danis Salman in a 2–0 defeat away to Bury, but left Plainmoor the following summer after making seven league appearances. He joined Shrewsbury Town but failed to make their first team, later playing for non-league side Moor Green, Stourbridge and Halesowen Town.

In June 2000 he joined Conference side Hereford United and although Hereford were one of the mainly full-time Conference sides, Gardiner remained a part-time player, making his Conference debut on 2 September in a 3–0 win away at Woking. He was released by Hereford in the summer of 2001 after missing the end of the season through injury having undergone a double hernia operation.

Following a brief spell at Worcester City where he played four games he linked up again with Hereford United on non-contract terms in September 2001. He then moved to Hednesford Town in November 2001 where he was one of new manager Kenny Hibbitt's first signings. Gardiner started the 2002–03 season at Evesham United before linking up with Redditch United in January 2003. In February 2005 he teamed up with Worcester City before signing for Worcestershire neighbours Bromsgrove Rovers.

== Coaching career ==
After a spell coaching at Bromsgrove Rovers, Gardiner returned to their Worcestershire neighbours Redditch United for his first management job. In spite of challenging times financially, he guided the club to the fourth qualifying round of the FA Cup and helped to develop a number of players including striker Matt Smith who went on to play for Oldham Athletic, Leeds United, Fulham, Queens Park Rangers and Millwall.

He left in February 2011 when the playing budget was cut to zero and linked up with Worcester City – first on the scouting side and then, in May 2011, as assistant manager to Carl Heeley. Over the next few seasons City made a name for themselves as non-league giant-killers in the FA Cup, knocking out a number of Football League sides. In 2014–15 they beat League One club Coventry City at the Ricoh Arena before losing to another League One side Scunthorpe United 14–13 on penalties – a record for the longest shoot-out in FA Cup history. He was appointed joint manager alongside Heeley the following season and another FA Cup run ended in a first round defeat at Bramall Lane against Sheffield United. Gardiner's ability to develop players continued at City with defender George Williams joining League One side Barnsley.

The start of the 2016–17 season saw Gardiner named head of coaching at Kidderminster Harriers, the first appointment of new manager John Eustace. Gardiner explained that the chance to continue his player development work on a full-time basis was key to his decision. He had a chance to further enhance those skills in the summer of 2017 when he worked alongside former QPR manager Chris Ramsey at the V9 Academy founded by England international Jamie Vardy.

In June 2018, Gardiner linked up with QPR with the remit of nurturing the younger squad members while developing his own skills under the guidance of manager Steve McClaren and assistant Eustace who had moved from Harriers the previous month. As assistant coach he helped with the development of emerging players including Eberechi Eze, Darnell Furlong and Bright Osayi-Samuel.

From May 2019 he was part of Mark Warburton's backroom team. Gardiner and Eustace left QPR in June 2022 after Warburton was replaced by Michael Beale, and when Eustace became head coach of Birmingham City a couple of weeks later, Gardiner was appointed as one of his two assistants. He left the club on 10 October 2023 after Eustace's dismissal.

In February 2024, he reunited with Eustace again when appointed as an assistant head coach at Blackburn Rovers. Eustace changed jobs to manage Derby County 12 months later and Gardiner followed him to Pride Park Stadium to become his assistant head coach.
