= Svenska Cupen (disambiguation) =

Svenska Cupen or Swedish Cup may refer to

- Svenska Cupen (association football)
- Svenska Cupen (women) (association football)
- Svenska Cupen (bandy)
- Copa Suecia (association football, Argentina 1958–1960)
