= 2024–25 National League Cup =

Tournament details
- Country: England
- Teams: 32

Final positions
- Champions: Leeds United U21 (1st title)
- Runners-up: Sutton United

Tournament statistics
- Matches played: 46
- Goals scored: 177 (3.85 per match)
- Attendance: 23,673 (515 per match)
- All statistics correct as of 15 October 2024.

The 2024–25 National League Cup is the 26th season in the history of the competition, and the first since its revival. It is a knock-out tournament involving 16 clubs in the National League, the fifth tier of the English football league system, and 16 professional under-21 teams playing in Premier League 2.

A prize fund of £1 million is distributed to non-league clubs in the fifth and sixth tiers, with the intention to provide younger players from the PL2 with senior experience. The relaunch of the competition has otherwise been controversial, with criticism and negativity from non-league clubs and their supporters.

== Participating clubs ==
- 16 invited clubs from the National League. (Note: Initially the 14 teams in the 2023-24 National League who were not promoted, plus the two teams relegated from League Two, were due to compete. However Barnet, Eastleigh, Hartlepool United, Solihull Moors and Southend United declined the invitation to the competition. AFC Fylde, Yeovil Town and York City also declined to compete, with the remaining teams from outside the top 16 from the previous season making up the numbers.)
- 16 invited Premier League 2 under-21 teams. (Note: Premier League 2 side Reading withdrew from the competition and were replaced by Derby County. (Note: Reading were originally allocated to Group A. On 25 September, Reading withdrew citing lack of available players and due to the "higher than expected demands on the squad", adding the "original decision to enter [the competition] was made back in June". On the same day, Derby County confirmed their participation in the competition as Reading's replacement.))

	National League	Premier League 2
Clubs	Aldershot Town; Altrincham; Boston United; Braintree Town; Dagenham & Redbridge; Ebbsfleet United; FC Halifax Town; Forest Green Rovers; Gateshead; Maidenhead United; Oldham Athletic; Rochdale; Sutton United; Tamworth; Wealdstone; Woking	Blackburn Rovers; Brighton & Hove Albion; Derby County; Fulham; Leeds United; Manchester United; Middlesbrough; Newcastle United; Nottingham Forest; Southampton; Stoke City; Sunderland; Tottenham Hotspur; West Bromwich Albion; West Ham United; Wolverhampton Wanderers
Total	16	16

== Competition format ==
League phase

- Four groups of eight teams.
- All groups will include four National League sides and four academy sides.
- All National League clubs will play each academy side once, and all academy sides will play each National League side once (academy sides will play all group matches away from home).
- Clubs will be awarded three points for a win and one point for a draw. Drawn matches will end in a penalty shoot-out with an extra point for the winners.
- The top two teams in each group will progress to the knockout stage.

Knockout stage

- In Round 2, the group winners will be seeded and the group runners-up will be unseeded in the draw.
- In Round 2, teams who played in the same group as each other in the group stage will be kept apart.

== Broadcasting ==
The National League announced all fixtures would be streamed live and free on NLTV.

== League phase ==
The group stage draw was made on 19 September 2024, when the competition was announced.

=== Group A ===
Pos	Div	Team	Pld	W	PW	PL	L	GF	GA	GD	Pts	Qualification
1	NL	Aldershot Town	4	3	0	0	1	9	5	+4	9	Advance to knockout stage
2	ACA	Brighton & Hove Albion U21	4	2	1	0	1	7	6	+1	8	Advance to knockout stage
3	NL	Maidenhead United	4	2	1	0	1	7	10	−3	8	
4	NL	Wealdstone	4	2	0	0	2	5	4	+1	6	
5	NL	Woking	4	1	1	1	1	10	9	+1	6	
6	ACA	Fulham U21	4	2	0	0	2	6	6	0	6	
7	ACA	Southampton U21	4	1	0	1	2	12	9	+3	4	
8	ACA	Derby County U21	4	0	0	1	3	3	10	−7	1	

Source: Premier League

1 October 2024	Woking	2–2 (3–4 p)	Brighton & Hove Albion U21	Woking
19:00 BST (UTC+1)	Andrews 89'; Kelly-Evans 90+6'	Report	Duffus 33'; McConville 54'	Stadium: The Laithwaite Community Stadium; Attendance: 227; Referee: Paul Johnson
	Penalties
	Walker (penalty scored); Beautyman (penalty scored); Anderson (penalty missed); Andrews (penalty scored); Leahy (penalty missed)		(penalty scored) Mullins; (penalty scored) Vickers; (penalty scored) Slater; (penalty scored) Moulton; (penalty missed) Simmonds

1 October 2024	Maidenhead United	2–0	Fulham U21	Maidenhead
19:30 BST (UTC+1)	McCoulsky 35'; Barratt 45+1'	Report		Stadium: York Road; Attendance: 210; Referee: Ross Martin

15 October 2024	Aldershot Town	3–0	Derby County U21	Aldershot
19:00 BST (UTC+1)	R. Jones 18', 59'; A. Jones 32'	Report		Stadium: The EBB Stadium; Attendance: 190; Referee: James Durkin

5 November 2024	Aldershot Town	2–3	Brighton & Hove Albion U21	Aldershot
19:00 GMT (UTC+0)	Henry 64', 86' (pen.)	Report	Ifill 80'; Duffus 82'; Vickers 90+3'	Stadium: The EBB Stadium; Attendance: 317; Referee: Farai Hallam

5 November 2024	Wealdstone	0–2	Fulham U21	Ruislip
19:00 GMT (UTC+0)		Report	Gordon 43'; Works 45+1'	Stadium: Grosvenor Vale; Attendance: 190; Referee: Jamie O'Connor

5 November 2024	Woking	4–4 (3–0 p)	Southampton U21	Woking
19:00 GMT (UTC+0)	Stretton 39'; Leahy 41'; Walker 53', 61'	Report	Ehibhatiomhan 2'; Robinson 35'; MacLeod 85'; Akachukwu 90+4'	Stadium: The Laithwaite Community Stadium; Attendance: 157; Referee: Michael Doyle
	Penalties
	Walker (penalty scored); Judge (penalty scored); Harries (penalty scored)		(penalty missed) Buck; (penalty missed) MacLeod; (penalty missed) Robinson

5 November 2024	Maidenhead United	3–3 (7–6 p)	Derby County U21	Maidenhead
19:30 GMT (UTC+0)	Sho-Silva 17'; Ajose 27', 70'	Report	Wheeldon 48'; Robinson 61'; Hawkins 73'	Stadium: York Road; Attendance: 145; Referee: Greg Rollason
	Penalties
	Sho-Silva (penalty scored); De Havilland (penalty scored); Carvalho (penalty scored); Pettit (penalty scored); Cochrane (penalty scored); Ajose (penalty scored); Bell (penalty missed); McMenemy (penalty scored)		(penalty scored) Spencer; (penalty scored) Rooney; (penalty scored) Robinson; (penalty scored) Eames; (penalty scored) Wheeldon; (penalty scored) Gill; (penalty missed) Hawkins; (penalty missed) Robinson

12 November 2024	Wealdstone	3–1	Southampton U21	Ruislip
GMT (UTC+0)	Adarkwa 4'; Sandat 31'; Thorpe 52'	Report	Merry 77'	Stadium: Grosvenor Vale; Attendance: 160; Referee: Paul Johnson

3 December 2024	Aldershot Town	2–1	Southampton U21	Aldershot
GMT (UTC+0)	Barrett 44'; Frost 51'	Report	Robinson 14'	Stadium: The EBB Stadium; Attendance: 272

3 December 2024	Wealdstone	2–0	Derby County U21	Ruislip
GMT (UTC+0)	Sandat 4'; Woodman 31'	Report		Stadium: Grosvenor Vale; Attendance: 93; Referee: Callum Walchester

3 December 2024	Woking	2–3	Fulham U21	Woking
GMT (UTC+0)	Ward 34'; Kelly-Evans 59'	Report	Loupalo-Bi 9'; Osmand 64', 88'	Stadium: The Laithwaite Community Stadium; Attendance: 222

4 December 2024	Maidenhead United	2–1	Brighton & Hove Albion U21	Maidenhead
19:30GMT (UTC+0)	Abrahams 11', 46'	Report	Vickers 87'	Stadium: York Road; Attendance: 160; Referee: Jason Richardson

14 January 2025	Woking	2–0	Derby County U21	Woking
GMT (UTC+0)	Beautyman 74'; Lewis 89'	Report		Stadium: The Laithwaite Community Stadium; Attendance: 91; Referee: Steve Parkinson

21 January 2025	Aldershot Town	2–1	Fulham U21	Aldershot
19:00 GMT (UTC+0)	Tetek 21'; Maghoma 60'	Report	Loupalo-Bi 84'	Stadium: The EBB Stadium; Attendance: 367; Referee: Jason Richardson

21 January 2025	Wealdstone	0–1	Brighton & Hove Albion U21	Ruislip
19:00 GMT (UTC+0)		Report	Peupion 69'	Stadium: Grosvenor Vale; Attendance: 116; Referee: Aaron Farmer

11 February 2025	Maidenhead United	0–6	Southampton U21	Maidenhead
19:45 GMT (UTC+0)		Report	Ehibhatiomhan 18', 32', 45'; Moore 51'; Sesay 65'; Bragg 87' (pen.)	Stadium: York Road; Referee: Sam Mulhall
Note: The match was originally scheduled for 28 January, but was postponed due to a waterlogged pitch.

=== Group B ===
Pos	Div	Team	Pld	W	PW	PL	L	GF	GA	GD	Pts	Qualification
1	ACA	Manchester United U21	4	4	0	0	0	13	2	+11	12	Advance to knockout stage
2	NL	Altrincham	4	2	1	0	1	9	9	0	8	Advance to knockout stage
3	NL	Rochdale	4	2	0	1	1	8	4	+4	7	
4	ACA	Wolverhampton Wanderers U21	4	1	2	0	1	7	6	+1	7	
5	NL	Oldham Athletic	4	2	0	1	1	7	10	−3	7	
6	ACA	Stoke City U21	4	1	0	0	3	6	8	−2	3	
7	NL	Forest Green Rovers	4	1	0	0	3	6	11	−5	3	
8	ACA	Blackburn Rovers U21	4	0	0	1	3	8	14	−6	1	

Source: Premier League

1 October 2024	Oldham Athletic	2–1	Stoke City U21	Oldham
19:00 BST (UTC+1)	Reid 29'; Charsley 72'	Report	Mears 67'	Stadium: Boundary Park; Attendance: 455; Referee: Stuart Morland

8 October 2024	Altrincham	3–3 (6–5 p)	Blackburn Rovers U21	Altrincham
19:30 BST (UTC+1)	Kosylo 7'; Crawford 55'; Weaver 83'	Report	Mafoumbi 47'; Stritch 79'; Leatherbarrow 88'	Stadium: Moss Lane; Attendance: 783; Referee: Richard Aspinall
	Penalties
	Crawford (penalty scored); Banks (penalty scored); Newby (penalty scored); Jones (penalty scored); Reddin (penalty missed); Kosylo (penalty scored); Weaver (penalty scored)		(penalty scored) Edmondson; (penalty missed) Stritch; (penalty scored) Montgomery; (penalty scored) Tyjon; (penalty scored) Litherland; (penalty scored) Bell; (penalty missed) Powell

9 October 2024	Forest Green Rovers	2–3	Manchester United U21	Nailsworth
19:00 BST (UTC+1)	Doidge 3'; Bunker 35'	Report	Sharpe 29'; Ennis 33'; Musa 77'	Stadium: The New Lawn; Attendance: 1,273; Referee: Jason Richardson

5 November 2024	Rochdale	4–1	Blackburn Rovers U21	Rochdale
GMT (UTC+0)	Dennis 18'; Barlow 47', 55'; Henderson 90+1'	Report	Litherland 41'	Stadium: Crown Oil Arena; Attendance: 426; Referee: Paul Cooper

5 November 2024	Forest Green Rovers	0–4	Stoke City U21	Nailsworth
GMT (UTC+0)		Report	Tezgel 6' (pen.), 18', 39', 49'	Stadium: The New Lawn; Attendance: 257; Referee: Elliott Swallow

6 November 2024	Oldham Athletic	2–2 (2–4 p)	Wolverhampton Wanderers U21	Oldham
GMT (UTC+0)	Stones 21'; Uchegbulam 27'	Report	Holman 25', 68'	Stadium: Boundary Park; Attendance: 520; Referee: Aaron Jackson
	Penalties
	Gardner (penalty missed); Khan (penalty scored); Kay (penalty missed); Hammond (penalty scored)		(penalty scored) Holman; (penalty scored) Okoduwa; (penalty scored) Sutherland; (penalty scored) Bradbury

19 November 2024	Altrincham	0–4	Manchester United U21	Altrincham
GMT (UTC+0)		Report	Ennis 16', 26', 90'; Ibragimov 70'	Stadium: J. Davidson Stadium; Attendance: 3,663; Referee: Stuart Morland

3 December 2024	Rochdale	0–1	Manchester United U21	Rochdale
GMT (UTC+0)		Report	Ibragimov 82'	Stadium: Crown Oil Arena; Attendance: 3,681; Referee: John Mulligan

3 December 2024	Altrincham	4–1	Stoke City U21	Altrincham
GMT (UTC+0)	Jones 43'; Golden 50'; Crawford 58'; Bickerstaff 90+1'	Report	Griffiths 23'	Stadium: J. Davidson Stadium; Attendance: 879; Referee: Paul Cooper

10 December 2024	Oldham Athletic	3–2	Blackburn Rovers U21	Oldham
GMT (UTC+0)	Teixeira 18'; Garner 38'; Moore 41'	Report	Stritch 35'; Doherty 90+1'	Stadium: Boundary Park; Attendance: 356; Referee: Callum Jones

18 December 2024	Forest Green Rovers	0–2	Wolverhampton Wanderers U21	Nailsworth
GMT (UTC+0)		Report	Ojinnaka 49'; Holman 56'	Stadium: The New Lawn

21 January 2025	Forest Green Rovers	4–2	Blackburn Rovers U21	Nailsworth
GMT (UTC+0)	Marquez 8', 33'; Quigley 57'; McCormick 90+1'	Report	Baker 17'; Doherty 53'	Stadium: The New Lawn; Attendance: 117; Referee: Ross Martin

21 January 2025	Rochdale	2–0	Stoke City U21	Rochdale
GMT (UTC+0)	Ayinde 14'; Weston 47'			Stadium: Crown Oil Arena

28 January 2025	Altrincham	2–1	Wolverhampton Wanderers U21	Altrincham
19:30 GMT (UTC+0)	Pasiek 67'; Weaver 77'	Report	Sutherland 31'	Stadium: J. Davidson Stadium; Attendance: 1,038; Referee: James Westgate

29 January 2025	Oldham Athletic	0–5	Manchester United U21	Oldham
19:00 GMT (UTC+0)		Report	Moorhouse 64'; Obi 70'; Sharpe 73'; Mather 84'; Musa 90+3'	Stadium: Boundary Park; Attendance: 1,895; Referee: Jamie O’Connor

11 February 2025	Rochdale	2–2 (1–4 p)	Wolverhampton Wanderers U21	Rochdale
19:00 GMT (UTC+0)	Henderson 36', 67'	Report	Whittingham 2'; Hubner 90+6'	Stadium: Crown Oil Arena; Attendance: 331; Referee: Gareth Rhodes
	Penalties
	Allarakhia (penalty missed); Edwards (penalty missed); Weston (penalty scored)		(penalty scored) Ángel; (penalty scored) Whittingham; (penalty scored) Lopes; (penalty scored) Hubner

=== Group C ===
Pos	Div	Team	Pld	W	PW	PL	L	GF	GA	GD	Pts	Qualification
1	ACA	Newcastle United U21	4	2	1	0	1	9	7	+2	8	Advance to knockout stage
2	ACA	Leeds United U21	4	2	1	0	1	9	8	+1	8	Advance to knockout stage
3	NL	Boston United	4	2	1	0	1	8	7	+1	8	
4	ACA	Middlesbrough U21	4	2	0	1	1	7	3	+4	7	
5	NL	Gateshead	4	1	1	0	2	6	8	−2	5	
6	ACA	Sunderland U21	4	1	0	1	2	8	6	+2	4	
7	NL	FC Halifax Town	4	1	0	1	2	6	9	−3	4	
8	NL	Tamworth	4	1	0	1	2	4	9	−5	4	

Source: Premier League

1 October 2024	FC Halifax Town	1–2	Newcastle United U21	Halifax
19:00 BST (UTC+1)	Oluwabori 18'	Report	Emerson 59'; Ford 71' (o.g.)	Stadium: The Shay; Attendance: 292; Referee: Michael Crusham

1 October 2024	Boston United	3–4	Leeds United U21	Boston
19:30 BST (UTC+1)	Ward 14', 76'; Marriott 39'	Report	Green 15' (o.g.); Thomas 54', 85'; Cresswell 83'	Stadium: Boston Community Stadium; Attendance: 467; Referee: Jamie O'Connor

1 October 2024	Gateshead	1–0	Middlesbrough U21	Gateshead
19:45 BST (UTC+1)	Malcolm 13'	Report		Stadium: Gateshead International Stadium; Attendance: 407; Referee: Ross Martin

5 November 2024	Boston United	1–0	Sunderland U21	Boston
GMT (UTC+0)	Mooney 42'	Report		Stadium: Boston Community Stadium; Attendance: 414; Referee: William Davis

5 November 2024	Tamworth	1–1 (5–6 p)	Newcastle United U21	Tamworth
GMT (UTC+0)	Tshikuna 84'	Report	Donaldson 63'	Stadium: The Lamb Ground; Attendance: 387; Referee: Robert Massey-Ellis
	Penalties
	Wallace (penalty missed); Fletcher (penalty scored); Creaney (penalty scored); Tshikuna (penalty scored); Digie (penalty scored); Cockerill-Mollett (penalty scored); Williams (penalty missed)		(penalty scored) Parkinson; (penalty missed) Huntley; (penalty scored) Turner-Cooke; (penalty scored) Donaldson; (penalty scored) Emerson; (penalty scored) McArthur; (penalty scored) Shahar

6 November 2024	Gateshead	1–2	Leeds United U21	Gateshead
GMT (UTC+0)	Adom 40'	Report	Chadwick-Chaplin 2'	Stadium: Gateshead International Stadium; Attendance: 272; Referee: Gareth Rhodes

12 November 2024	FC Halifax Town	1–4	Middlesbrough U21	Halifax
GMT (UTC+0)	Bray 55'	Report	Matthews 24'; Finch 37', 49', 81'	Stadium: The Shay; Attendance: 256; Referee: James Westgate

19 November 2024	Tamworth	1–5	Sunderland U21	Tamworth
GMT (UTC+0)	Cockerill-Mollett 42'	Report	Samuel-Ogunsuyi 2', 52'; Lavery 11'; Jones 69'; Crompton 83'	Stadium: The Lamb Ground; Attendance: 403; Referee: Mr. R. Eley

3 December 2024	Boston United	3–2	Newcastle United U21	Boston
GMT (UTC+0)	Osbourne 3'; Aderoju 76'; Maguire 81'	Report	Parkinson 11', 40'	Stadium: Boston Community Stadium; Attendance: 386; Referee: Michael Crusham

3 December 2024	FC Halifax Town	2–2 (3–5 p)	Leeds United U21	Halifax
GMT (UTC+0)	Bray 62'; Senior 90+5'	Report	Chadwick-Chaplin 34'; Snowdon 80'	Stadium: The Shay; Attendance: 471; Referee: Stuart Morland
	Penalties
	Senior (penalty missed); Hoti (penalty scored); Alimi-Adetoro (penalty scored); Cooke (penalty scored)		(penalty scored) Snowdon; (penalty scored) Chadwick-Chaplin; (penalty scored) Toulson; (penalty scored) Chambers; (penalty scored) Cresswell

4 December 2024	Gateshead	2–2 (5–4 p)	Sunderland U21	Gateshead
GMT (UTC+0)	Hannant 52'; Malcolm 56'		Aouchiche 63'; Samuel-Ogunsuyi 68'	Stadium: Gateshead International Stadium; Attendance: 100; Referee: Robert Massey-Ellis
	Penalties
	Whelan (penalty scored); Malcolm (penalty scored); Home (penalty scored); Worman (penalty scored); Radcliffe (penalty scored)		(penalty scored) Jones; (penalty missed) Ba; (penalty scored) Bennette; (penalty scored) Aouchiche; (penalty scored) Aleksić

21 January 2025	Boston United	1–1 (5–4 p)	Middlesbrough U21	Boston
GMT (UTC+0)	Hazel 90'	Report	Woolston 86'	Stadium: Boston Community Stadium; Attendance: 273; Referee: John Mulligan
	Penalties
	Green (penalty scored); Weston (penalty scored); Hazel (penalty scored); Ward (penalty scored); Marriott (penalty scored)		(penalty scored) Stott; (penalty scored) Nkrumah; (penalty scored) Woolston; (penalty scored) Lennon; (penalty missed) Matthews

21 January 2025	Gateshead	2–4	Newcastle United U21	Gateshead
GMT (UTC+0)	Malcolm 14'; Tripp 23'	Report	Harrison 8'; Donaldson 18'; Kuol 75'; Palmer 82'	Stadium: Gateshead International Stadium; Attendance: 470

21 January 2025	Tamworth	2–1	Leeds United U21	Tamworth
GMT (UTC+0)	Digie 25'; Tshikuna 42'	Report	Coleman 74'	Stadium: The Lamb Ground; Attendance: 351

28 January 2025	FC Halifax Town	2–1	Sunderland U21	Halifax
19:00 GMT (UTC+0)	Emmerson 57'; Cummings 90'	Report	Samuel-Ogunsuyi 20'	Stadium: The Shay; Attendance: 195; Referee: Michael Barlow

28 January 2025	Tamworth	0–2	Middlesbrough U21	Tamworth
19:45 GMT (UTC+0)		Report	McCabe 62'; Finch 76'	Stadium: The Lamb Ground; Attendance: 355; Referee: Stuart Morland

=== Group D ===
Pos	Div	Team	Pld	W	PW	PL	L	GF	GA	GD	Pts	Qualification
1	NL	Braintree Town	4	4	0	0	0	11	5	+6	12	Advance to knockout stage
2	NL	Sutton United	4	2	1	0	1	8	6	+2	8	Advance to knockout stage
3	NL	Dagenham & Redbridge	4	2	0	1	1	8	9	−1	7	
4	ACA	West Ham United U21	4	2	0	0	2	6	5	+1	6	
5	NL	Ebbsfleet United	4	0	2	1	1	4	5	−1	5	
6	ACA	Nottingham Forest U21	4	1	0	1	2	6	6	0	4	
7	ACA	Tottenham Hotspur U21	4	0	2	0	2	7	12	−5	4	
8	ACA	West Bromwich Albion U21	4	0	0	2	2	5	7	−2	2	

Source: Premier League

1 October 2024	Ebbsfleet United	2–2 (5–4 p)	West Bromwich Albion U21	Northfleet
19:00 BST (UTC+1)	Domi 17'; Ondo 35'	Report	Williams 81'; Deeming 90+4' (pen.)	Stadium: Kuflink Stadium; Attendance: 213; Referee: Abigail Byrne
	Penalties
	Wright (penalty scored); Thomas (penalty scored); Tanga (penalty scored); Cundle (penalty scored); Randall (penalty scored)		(penalty scored) Deeming; (penalty scored) Onyemachi; (penalty scored) Sule; (penalty scored) Chimeziri; (penalty missed) Higgins

1 October 2024	Dagenham & Redbridge	5–5 (3–5 p)	Tottenham Hotspur U21	Dagenham
19:30 BST (UTC+1)	Stephenson 4'; Hill 5', 39'; Remy 37'; Mbiya-Kalambayi 71'	Report	Williams 29', 78'; Kyerematen 51'; Robson 68'; Akhamrich 80'	Stadium: Chigwell Construction Stadium; Attendance: 184; Referee: Alan Dale
	Penalties
	Morias (penalty scored); Stephenson (penalty scored); Vincent (penalty missed); Remy (penalty scored)		(penalty scored) Williams; (penalty scored) Hall; (penalty scored) Black; (penalty scored) Andiyapan; (penalty scored) Akhamrich

29 October 2024	Ebbsfleet United	1–1 (3–4 p)	Tottenham Hotspur U21	Northfleet
19:00 GMT (UTC+0)	Chapman 41'	Report	Kyerematen 23'	Stadium: Kuflink Stadium; Attendance: 865; Referee: Elliott Swallow
	Penalties
	Domi (penalty missed); Fonguck (penalty missed); John (penalty scored); Tanga (penalty missed); Manktelow (penalty scored); Chapman (penalty scored); Tanner (penalty missed)		(penalty scored) Hall; (penalty missed) Williams; (penalty missed) Black; (penalty missed) Akhamrich; (penalty scored) Cassanova; (penalty scored) Kyerematen; (penalty scored) McKnight

5 November 2024	Braintree Town	4–2	West Ham United U21	Braintree
GMT (UTC+0)	Akinde 15'; Effiong 60'; Lisbie 64'; Langston 86'		Ajala 9'; Scarles 36'	Stadium: Rare Breed Meat Co. Stadium; Attendance: 437

5 November 2024	Dagenham & Redbridge	2–1	West Bromwich Albion U21	Dagenham
GMT (UTC+0)	Umerah 40'; Adigun 49'	Report	Chimeziri 66'	Stadium: Chigwell Construction Stadium; Attendance: 183

3 December 2024	Braintree Town	3–2	West Bromwich Albion U21	Braintree
GMT (UTC+0)	Fyfield 15'; Lisbie 45'; Effiong 77'	Report 1 Report 2	Cleary 29', 40'	Stadium: Rare Breed Meat Co. Stadium; Attendance: 123

3 December 2024	Dagenham & Redbridge	1–3	Nottingham Forest U21	Dagenham
GMT (UTC+0)	Rees 32'	Report	Berry 43', 55'; Nadin 79'	Stadium: Chigwell Construction Stadium; Attendance: 174

3 December 2024	Sutton United	3–0	Tottenham Hotspur U21	Sutton
GMT (UTC+0)	Simper 8'; Williams 51'; Ransom 90+2'	Report		Stadium: VBS Community Stadium; Attendance: 1,092; Referee: Stephen Parkinson

10 December 2024	Braintree Town	1–0	Nottingham Forest U21	Braintree
GMT (UTC+0)	Blackwell 45'			Stadium: Rare Breed Meat Co. Stadium; Attendance: 148

17 December 2024	Sutton United	0–2	West Ham United U21	Sutton
GMT (UTC+0)		Report	Ajala 29'; Robinson 82'	Stadium: VBS Community Stadium; Attendance: 1,164; Referee: Matthew Russell

7 January 2025	Ebbsfleet United	1–2	West Ham United U21	Northfleet
GMT (UTC+0)	Odokonyero 86'	Report	Ajala 9'; Simon-Swyer 55'	Stadium: Kuflink Stadium; Attendance: 508

21 January 2025	Ebbsfleet United	1–1 (2–1 p)	Nottingham Forest U21	Northfleet
19:00 GMT (UTC+0)	Thomas 90+2'	Report	McAdam 84'	Stadium: Kuflink Stadium; Attendance: 215; Referee: Stephen Parkinson
	Penalties
	Bingham (penalty scored); Thomas (penalty scored); Moncur (penalty missed); Tanga (penalty missed)		(penalty scored) Norkett; (penalty missed) Berry; (penalty missed) Sinclair; (penalty missed) McAdam; (penalty missed) Thompson

21 January 2025	Sutton United	2–2 (3–1 p)	West Bromwich Albion U21	Sutton
19:30 GMT (UTC+0)	Boateng 24'; Coley 29'	Report	Mandey 14', 55'	Stadium: VBS Community Stadium; Attendance: 657; Referee: Richard Aspinall
	Penalties
	Simper (penalty scored); Trickett (penalty scored); Moore (penalty missed); Boateng (penalty scored)		(penalty missed) Deeming; (penalty scored) Williams; (penalty missed) Dupont; (penalty missed) Richards

21 January 2025	Dagenham & Redbridge	2–0	West Ham United U21	Dagenham
19:45 GMT (UTC+0)	Pereira 3' (pen.); Mahorn 52'	Report		Stadium: Chigwell Construction Stadium; Attendance: 733; Referee: Paul Johnson

29 January 2025	Braintree Town	3–1	Tottenham Hotspur U21	Braintree
19:45 GMT (UTC+0)	Cooper 28', 45'; Lisbie 82' (pen.)	Report	Irow 76'	Stadium: Rare Breed Meat Co. Stadium; Attendance: 543; Referee: Jason Richardson

4 February 2025	Sutton United	3–2	Nottingham Forest U21	Sutton
19:30 GMT (UTC+0)	De Silva 10'; Kirk 16'; Boateng 75' (pen.)	Report	Fletcher 39'; McAdam 90'	Stadium: VBS Community Stadium; Attendance: 723; Referee: Jason Richardson

== Quarter-finals ==
Teams who played in the same group in the group stage are kept apart. The draw was completed on 13 February 2025.

=== Qualified teams ===
Group	Winners	Runners-up
A	Aldershot Town	Brighton & Hove Albion U21
B	Manchester United U21	Altrincham
C	Newcastle United U21	Leeds United U21
D	Braintree Town	Sutton United

25 February 2025	Sutton United	3–0	Manchester United U21	Sutton
19:00	Barbrook 27'; Boateng 66'; Wadham 68'	Report		Stadium: VBS Community Stadium; Attendance: 1,729; Referee: Stephen Parkinson

25 February 2025	Altrincham	3–3 (3–2 p)	Newcastle United U21	Altrincham
19:30	Reddin 6'; Taylor 9'; Amaluzor 89'	Report	Kuol 19', 57'; Turner-Cooke 29' (pen.)	Stadium: Moss Lane; Attendance: 623; Referee: William Davis
	Penalties
	Griffiths (penalty missed); Reddin (penalty scored); Cooper (penalty missed); Kosylo (penalty scored); Amaluzor (penalty scored)		(penalty scored) Harrison; (penalty missed) Stanton; (penalty scored) Turner-Cooke; (penalty missed) Neave; (penalty missed) Shahar

11 March 2025	Aldershot Town	1–3	Leeds United U21	Aldershot
19:00	Corbett 31'	Report	Chadwick-Chaplain 56', 71'; Pickles 60'	Stadium: Recreation Ground; Attendance: 851; Referee: Harry Wager

11 March 2025	Braintree Town	2–1	Brighton & Hove Albion U21	Braintree
19:45	Francis 1'; Lisbie 52'	Report	Bashir 47'	Stadium: Cressing Road; Attendance: 408; Referee: Aaron Farmer

== Semi-finals ==
Leeds United U21 were the only remaining semi-finalist who plays in Premier League 2. The semi-finals were scheduled to be played on 1 April.

=== Qualified teams ===
Altrincham (Group B)

Braintree Town (Group D)

Leeds United U21 (Group C)

Sutton United (Group D)

1 April 2025	Altrincham	1–2	Leeds United U21	Altrincham
19:30 PM	Amaluzor 66'	Report	Monteiro 38'; McDonald 52'	Stadium: Moss Lane; Attendance: 1,025; Referee: Gary Rhodes

1 April 2025	Braintree Town	0–0 (4–5 p)	Sutton United	Braintree
19:45 PM		Report		Stadium: Cressing Road; Attendance: 728; Referee: Stephen Parkinson
	Penalties
	Akinde (penalty scored); Robinson (penalty scored); Marshall-Miranda (penalty scored); Langston (penalty scored); Francis (penalty missed); Clampin (penalty missed); Pinnington (penalty missed)		(penalty scored) Simper; (penalty scored) Odelusi; (penalty scored) Topalloj; (penalty scored) Boateng; (penalty missed) Wadham; (penalty missed) Nadesan; (penalty scored) Vaz

== Final ==
29 April 2025
19:00

Sutton United	1–2	Leeds United U21
Simper 77'	Report	Monteiro 25'; Gray 56'

VBS Community Stadium, Sutton
Attendance: 3,062
Referee: Sam Mulhall
