= 2026–27 National League Cup =

Tournament details
- Country: England
- Teams: 32

Tournament statistics
- Matches played: 64
- Goals scored: 237 (3.7 per match)
- Attendance: 19,675 (307 per match)
- Top goal scorer(s): (England) Frankie Coulson (Middlesbrough) (7 goals)
- All statistics correct as of 3 November 2026.

The 2026–27 National League Cup, is the 28th season in the history of the competition, and the third since its revival in 2024–25. It is a knock-out tournament between clubs in the National League, the fifth tier of the English football league system, 16 professional under-21 teams playing in Premier League 2 and 2 National League South clubs.

A prize fund of £1 million is to be shared only with participating National League clubs, and with sixth tier clubs. Premier League 2 clubs do not receive any prize money or participation fee.

The 10–0 victory for Middlesbrough U21s over Hartlepool United on 11 August 2026, was the biggest victory in the competition's history, alongside the biggest defeat that Hartlepool United had ever suffered.

== Participating clubs ==
- 14 invited clubs from the National League.
- 2 invited clubs from National League South.
- 16 invited Premier League 2 under-21 teams.

| | National League | National League South | Premier League 2 |
|---|---|---|---|
| Clubs | Aldershot Town; Boreham Wood; Boston United; FC Halifax Town; Gateshead; Hartlepool United; Hornchurch; Scunthorpe United; Solihull Moors; Sutton United; Tamworth; Wealdstone; Woking; Worthing | Braintree Town; Truro City | Birmingham City; Derby County; Everton; Fulham; Ipswich Town; Leeds United; Leicester City; Middlesbrough; Newcastle United; Norwich City; Nottingham Forest; Southampton; Stoke City; West Bromwich Albion; West Ham United; Wolverhampton Wanderers |
| Total | 14 | 2 | 16 |

== Competition format ==
League phase

- Four groups of eight teams.
- All groups will include four fifth or sixth tier sides and four academy sides.
- All National League clubs will play each academy side once, and all academy sides will play each National League side once (academy sides will play all group matches away from home).
- Clubs will be awarded three points for a win and one point for a draw. Drawn matches will end in a penalty shoot-out with an extra point for the winners.
- The top two teams in each group will progress to the knockout stage.

Knockout stage

== Broadcasting ==
The National League announced all fixtures would be streamed live and free on the National League YouTube channel.

== Group stage ==
The group stage draw was made on 6 August 2026.

=== Group A ===
| Pos | Div | Team | Pld | W | PW | PL | L | GF | GA | GD | Pts | Qualification |
|---|---|---|---|---|---|---|---|---|---|---|---|---|
| 1 | NL | FC Halifax Town | 4 | 3 | 0 | 0 | 1 | 16 | 8 | +8 | 9 | Advance to knockout stage |
| 2 | NL | Scunthorpe United | 4 | 2 | 1 | 1 | 0 | 10 | 5 | +5 | 9 | Advance to knockout stage |
| 3 | NL | Wealdstone | 4 | 2 | 1 | 0 | 1 | 10 | 5 | +5 | 8 | |
| 4 | ACA | Wolverhampton Wanderers U21 | 4 | 1 | 2 | 0 | 1 | 5 | 6 | −1 | 7 | |
| 5 | NL | Gateshead | 4 | 1 | 0 | 2 | 1 | 5 | 5 | 0 | 5 | |
| 6 | ACA | Nottingham Forest U21 | 4 | 1 | 1 | 0 | 2 | 6 | 7 | −1 | 5 | |
| 7 | ACA | Derby County U21 | 4 | 1 | 0 | 2 | 1 | 9 | 11 | −2 | 5 | |
| 8 | ACA | Stoke City U21 | 4 | 0 | 0 | 0 | 4 | 3 | 17 | −14 | 0 | |

Updated to match(es) played on 3 November 2026. Source: Premier League

| 18 August 2026 | Gateshead | 1–1 (4–5 p) | Nottingham Forest U21 | Gateshead |
| 19:00 BST (UTC+1) | Anifowose 61' | Report | Sillah 69' | Stadium: Gateshead International Stadium; Attendance: 262; Referee: James Westgate |
| | Penalties |
| | Smith (penalty scored); Bowen (penalty missed); Fenton (penalty scored); Coyle (penalty scored); Chapman (penalty scored) | | (penalty scored) Sinclair; (penalty scored) Powell; (penalty scored) McDonnell; (penalty scored) Blake; (penalty scored) Sillah |

| 18 August 2026 | FC Halifax Town | 6–2 | Derby County U21 | Halifax |
| 19:00 BST (UTC+1) | Carty 9'; Morgan-Smith 37', 45+2'; Allen 53'; Bardell 70'; Bray 72' | Report | Oguntolu 30' (pen.); Eames 44' | Stadium: The Shay; Attendance: 253; Referee: Gareth Rhodes |

| 18 August 2026 | Scunthorpe United | 4–0 | Stoke City U21 | Scunthorpe |
| 19:00 BST (UTC+1) | Parker 45+2'; Shipstone 68'; Gale 74', 89' | Report | | Stadium: Glanford Park; Attendance: 513; Referee: Matthew McQuillan |

| 18 August 2026 | Wealdstone | 1–3 | Wolverhampton Wanderers U21 | Ruislip |
| 19:00 BST (UTC+1) | Lee 46' | Report | Ji 66'; Anunlopo 73'; Gonzales-Osbourne 81' | Stadium: Grosvenor Vale; Attendance: 227; Referee: Richie Watkins |

| 8 September 2026 | Gateshead | 1–3 | Derby County U21 | Gateshead |
| 19:00 BST (UTC+1) | Osayande 64' (o.g.) | Report | Mintus 15'; Marsh 44'; Oguntolu 54' | Stadium: Gateshead International Stadium; Referee: Paul Marsden |

| 8 September 2026 | FC Halifax Town | 3–0 | Wolverhampton Wanderers U21 | Halifax |
| 19:00 BST (UTC+1) | Tollitt 36'; C. Allen 55'; A. Allen 67' | Report | | Stadium: The Shay; Attendance: 198; Referee: William Davis |

| 8 September 2026 | Scunthorpe United | 2–1 | Nottingham Forest U21 | Scunthorpe |
| 19:00 BST (UTC+1) | Howe 35'; Brennan 52' | Report | Bradshaw 76' | Stadium: Glanford Park; Attendance: 513; Referee: Aaron Bannister |

| 8 September 2026 | Wealdstone | 6–0 | Stoke City U21 | Ruislip |
| 19:00 BST (UTC+1) | Waweru 28', 50', 78'; Kaunda 62', 80'; Olomola 68' | Report | | Stadium: Grosvenor Vale; Attendance: 146; Referee: Sam Mitchell |

| 13 October 2026 | Gateshead | 0–0 (1–4 p) | Wolverhampton Wanderers U21 | Gateshead |
| 19:00 BST (UTC+1) | | Report | | Stadium: Gateshead International Stadium; Referee: Andrew Miller |
| | Penalties |
| | Coyle (penalty missed); Eguaibor (penalty scored); Supyk (penalty missed) | | (penalty scored) González; (penalty scored) Rawlings; (penalty scored) Bradbury; (penalty scored) Ángel |

| 13 October 2026 | FC Halifax Town | 4–2 | Stoke City U21 | Halifax |
| 19:00 BST (UTC+1) | McDermott 16'; Morgan-Smith 31'; Douglas 69'; Tollitt 90+4' | Report | Martin 32'; Fearn 70' | Stadium: The Shay; Referee: Gareth Thomas |

| 13 October 2026 | Scunthorpe United | 2–2 (4–3 p) | Derby County U21 | Scunthorpe |
| 19:00 BST (UTC+1) | Gale 6'; Richards 25' | Report | Wilson 86', 80' | Stadium: Glanford Park; Referee: Robert Massey-Ellis |
| | Penalties |
| | Batty (penalty missed); Brennan (penalty scored); Howe (penalty scored); Starbuck (penalty missed); Bailey (penalty scored); Gale (penalty scored) | | (penalty missed) Oguntolu; (penalty scored) Wilson; (penalty scored) Mintus; (penalty scored) Hodges; (penalty missed) Jones; (penalty missed) Robinson |

| 20 October 2026 | Wealdstone | 1–0 | Nottingham Forest U21 | Ruislip |
| 19:00 BST (UTC+1) | Kaunda 67' | Report | | Stadium: Grosvenor Vale; Attendance: 128; Referee: Robert Massey-Ellis |

| 3 November 2026 | Gateshead | 3–1 | Stoke City U21 | Gateshead |
| 19:00 GMT | Anifowose 18'; Issaka 64'; Boatswain 71' | Report | Holgate 75' (o.g.) | Stadium: Gateshead International Stadium; Referee: Michael Barlow |

| 3 November 2026 | FC Halifax Town | 3–4 | Nottingham Forest U21 | Halifax |
| 19:00 GMT | Modupe 43' (o.g.); Gilsenan 67'; Morgan-Smith 76' | Report | Samuels 10'; Smith 29' (pen.); Powell 51' (pen.); Bradshaw 90+8' | Stadium: The Shay; Attendance: 236; Referee: Stuart Morland |

| 3 November 2026 | Scunthorpe United | 2–2 (4–5 p) | Wolverhampton Wanderers U21 | Scunthorpe |
| 19:00 GMT | Parker 7'; Howe 56' | Report | González 6', 48' | Stadium: Glanford Park; Referee: Jamie O'Connor |
| | Penalties |
| | Brennan (penalty scored); Jones (penalty scored); Rose (penalty scored); Hurst (penalty scored); Beestin (penalty missed); Clayton (penalty missed) | | (penalty scored) González; (penalty scored) Ji; (penalty missed) Bradbury; (penalty scored) Ballard-Matthews; (penalty scored) Okoduwa; (penalty scored) Lochhead |

| 3 November 2026 | Wealdstone | 2–2 (3–2 p) | Derby County U21 | Ruislip |
| 19:00 GMT | Uchenna 65'; Banjoko 79' | Report | Oguntolu 75', 90+1' (pen.) | Stadium: Grosvenor Vale; Attendance: 146; Referee: Kirsty Dowle |
| | Penalties |
| | Kaunda (penalty scored); Lee (penalty scored); Uchenna (penalty scored); Oni (penalty missed) | | (penalty scored) Oguntolu; (penalty scored) Jones; (penalty missed) Smith; (penalty missed) Osong; (penalty missed) Tola |

=== Group B ===
| Pos | Div | Team | Pld | W | PW | PL | L | GF | GA | GD | Pts | Qualification |
|---|---|---|---|---|---|---|---|---|---|---|---|---|
| 1 | ACA | West Ham United U21 | 4 | 3 | 0 | 0 | 1 | 9 | 5 | +4 | 9 | Advance to knockout stage |
| 2 | ACA | Ipswich Town U21 | 4 | 2 | 1 | 0 | 1 | 8 | 5 | +3 | 8 | Advance to knockout stage |
| 3 | NL | Hornchurch | 4 | 2 | 0 | 1 | 1 | 7 | 3 | +4 | 7 | |
| 4 | NLS | Braintree | 4 | 2 | 0 | 1 | 1 | 8 | 7 | +1 | 7 | |
| 5 | ACA | Norwich City U21 | 4 | 1 | 1 | 0 | 2 | 6 | 9 | −3 | 5 | |
| 6 | NL | Worthing | 4 | 1 | 0 | 1 | 2 | 4 | 5 | −1 | 4 | |
| 7 | ACA | Fulham U21 | 4 | 0 | 2 | 0 | 2 | 5 | 7 | −2 | 4 | |
| 8 | NL | Aldershot Town | 4 | 1 | 0 | 1 | 2 | 7 | 13 | −6 | 4 | |

Updated to match(es) played on 3 November 2026. Source: Premier League

| 18 August 2026 | Hornchurch | 1–2 | Norwich City U21 | Upminster |
| 19:00 BST (UTC+1) | Walker 34' | Report | Ameen 28'; Myles 53' | Stadium: Hornchurch Stadium; Attendance: 356; Referee: Jason Richardson |

| 18 August 2026 | Braintree Town | 1–1 (3–4 p) | Ipswich U21 | Braintree |
| 19:30 BST (UTC+1) | Al. Lewis 90' | Report | Fletcher 50' | Stadium: Cressing Road; Attendance: 347; Referee: Adam Merchant |
| | Penalties |
| | An. Lewis (penalty scored); Evans (penalty missed); Al. Lewis (penalty scored); Senior (penalty missed); Bennett (penalty scored) | | (penalty scored) Mendel-Idowu; (penalty scored) Mažionis; (penalty missed) Nicolaou; (penalty scored) Eldred; (penalty scored) Mthunzi |

| 18 August 2026 | Worthing | 1–2 | West Ham United U21 | Worthing |
| 19:30 BST (UTC+1) | Moulton 27' | Report | Landers 59'; Battrum 64' | Stadium: Woodside Road; Attendance: 1,321; Referee: Aaron Farmer |

| 18 August 2026 | Aldershot Town | 2–2 (2–4 p) | Fulham U21 | Aldershot |
| 19:45 BST (UTC+1) | Wyllie 36'; Sandah 65' | Report | Quashie 1'; Benchaita 40' | Stadium: Recreation Ground; Attendance: 445; Referee: Matthew Scholes |
| | Penalties |
| | Abrahams (penalty missed); Peart (penalty scored); Wyllie (penalty scored); Lawless (penalty missed) | | (penalty missed) Sani Isah; (penalty scored) Casey; (penalty scored) Slade; (penalty scored) Olyott; (penalty scored) Vally |

| 8 September 2026 | Hornchurch | 3–0 | Ipswich U21 | Upminster |
| 19:00 BST (UTC+1) | Kizzi 31'; Kelman 59'; Sandat 84' | Report | | Stadium: Hornchurch Stadium; Attendance: 211; Referee: James Oldham |

| 8 September 2026 | Aldershot Town | 0–3 | West Ham United U21 | Aldershot |
| 19:30 BST (UTC+1) | | Report | Cummings 9'; Medine 32', 35' | Stadium: Recreation Ground; Attendance: 491; Referee: Robert Massey-Ellis |

| 8 September 2026 | Braintree Town | 2–1 | Fulham U21 | Braintree |
| 19:30 BST (UTC+1) | Paternoster 18'; Bolovan 81' | Report | Kusi-Asare 62' | Stadium: Cressing Road; Attendance: 199; Referee: Daniel Blades |

| 8 September 2026 | Worthing | 0–0 (4–5 p) | Norwich City U21 | Worthing |
| 19:30 BST (UTC+1) | | Report | | Stadium: Woodside Road; Attendance: 638; Referee: Adam Merchant |
| | Penalties |
| | Packham (penalty missed); Makowski (penalty scored); Godziemski (penalty scored); Nathaniel-George (penalty scored); Moore (penalty scored) | | (penalty scored) Towler; (penalty scored) Chilvers; (penalty scored) Corke; (penalty scored) Mundle; (penalty scored) Domeracki |

| 6 October 2026 | Hornchurch | 1–1 (5–6 p) | Fulham U21 | Upminster |
| 19:00 BST (UTC+1) | Hearn 32' | Report | Zepa 26' | Stadium: Hornchurch Stadium; Referee: Jason Richardson |
| | Penalties |
| | Powell (penalty scored); Balanta (penalty scored); Loft (penalty scored); Dallison (penalty missed); Sagaf (penalty scored); Pegrum (penalty scored); McKnight (penalty missed) | | (penalty scored) Casey; (penalty scored) Olyott; (penalty scored) White; (penalty scored) Slade; (penalty missed) Kondau-Wall; (penalty scored) Cavell; (penalty scored) Evans |

| 13 October 2026 | Braintree Town | 2–4 | West Ham United U21 | Braintree |
| 19:30 BST (UTC+1) | Dyer 41'; Matthews 71' | Report | Cummings 13', 26'; Kerr 50'; Dike 57' | Stadium: Cressing Road; Referee: Alex Chilowicz |

| 13 October 2026 | Aldershot Town | 5–3 | Norwich City U21 | Aldershot |
| 19:45 BST (UTC+1) | Dinanga 16' (pen.), 25', 60'; Abrahams 23'; Wyllie 64' | Report | Myles 42'; Chilvers 67'; Corke 72' | Stadium: Recreation Ground; Referee: Leigh Doughty |

| 13 October 2026 | Worthing | 1–2 | Ipswich U21 | Worthing |
| 19:45 BST (UTC+1) | Sutton 6' | Report | Nicolaou 43'; Fletcher 60' | Stadium: Woodside Road; Attendance: 521; Referee: Isaac Searle |

| 3 November 2026 | Hornchurch | 2–0 | West Ham United U21 | Upminster |
| 19:00 GMT | Pegrum 64'; Loft 87' | Report | | Stadium: Hornchurch Stadium; Referee: Richie Watkins |

| 3 November 2026 | Braintree Town | 3–1 | Norwich City U21 | Braintree |
| 19:30 GMT | Hambury 5'; Matthews 41' (pen.); Dyer 49' | Report | Corke 10' | Stadium: Cressing Road; Referee: Jason Richardson |

| 3 November 2026 | Aldershot Town | 0–5 | Ipswich U21 | Aldershot |
| 19:45 GMT | | Report | Mažionis 5'; Runham 60', 86'; Lewis 63'; Nicolaou 90+2' | Stadium: Recreation Ground; Referee: Sam Mulhall |

| 3 November 2026 | Worthing | 2–1 | Fulham U21 | Worthing |
| 19:45 Greenwich Mean Time | Colbran 4'; Benchaita 85' (o.g.) | Report | Sani 71' | Stadium: Woodside Road; Attendance: 404 |

=== Group C ===
| Pos | Div | Team | Pld | W | PW | PL | L | GF | GA | GD | Pts | Qualification |
|---|---|---|---|---|---|---|---|---|---|---|---|---|
| 1 | NL | Boreham Wood | 4 | 3 | 0 | 1 | 0 | 15 | 5 | +10 | 10 | Advance to knockout stage |
| 2 | ACA | Middlesbrough U21 | 4 | 3 | 0 | 0 | 1 | 17 | 9 | +8 | 9 | Advance to knockout stage |
| 3 | ACA | Everton U21 | 4 | 2 | 1 | 0 | 1 | 5 | 4 | +1 | 8 | |
| 4 | NL | Tamworth | 4 | 2 | 0 | 0 | 2 | 9 | 9 | 0 | 6 | |
| 5 | NL | Solihull Moors | 4 | 2 | 0 | 0 | 2 | 6 | 7 | −1 | 6 | |
| 6 | ACA | Newcastle United U21 | 4 | 1 | 0 | 0 | 3 | 7 | 10 | −3 | 3 | |
| 7 | ACA | Leeds United U21 | 4 | 1 | 0 | 0 | 3 | 6 | 11 | −5 | 3 | |
| 8 | NL | Hartlepool United | 4 | 1 | 0 | 0 | 3 | 4 | 14 | −10 | 3 | |

Updated to match(es) played on 3 November 2026. Source: Premier League

| 11 August 2026 | Hartlepool United | 0–10 | Middlesbrough U21 | Hartlepool |
| 19:00 BST (UTC+1) | | Report | Coulson 5', 50', 70', 90'; Campbell 8', 52'; Tika-Lemba 37'; James 54'; Kaikai 60'; Harrison 65' | Stadium: Victoria Park; Referee: Stuart Morland |

| 18 August 2026 | Boreham Wood | 5–2 | Leeds United U21 | Borehamwood |
| 19:00 BST (UTC+1) | Booty 8'; Richardson 31', 45+4'; Ali Wahid 41'; Allarakhia 45+2' | Report | Chambers 69'; McDonald 75' | Stadium: Meadow Park; Attendance: 704; Referee: Sam Mulhall |

| 18 August 2026 | Solihull Moors | 1–3 | Middlesbrough U21 | Solihull |
| 19:00 BST (UTC+1) | McFarlane 28' | Report | Campbell 3'; Coulson 24', 56' | Stadium: Damson Park; Referee: Paul Marsden |

| 18 August 2026 | Tamworth | 5–3 | Newcastle United U21 | Tamworth |
| 19:45 BST (UTC+1) | McGlinchey 15'; Hutchinson 19', 31'; Creaney 73'; Silva 90' | Report | Sanusi 45'; Salia 48'; Lovett 71' (o.g.) | Stadium: The Lamb Ground; Attendance: 439; Referee: Declan Brown |

| 8 September 2026 | Boreham Wood | 2–1 | Newcastle United U21 | Borehamwood |
| 19:00 BST (UTC+1) | Ali Wahid 45'; Brunt 72' | Report | Ferreira 10' | Stadium: Meadow Park; Attendance: 536; Referee: Matthew Norton |

| 8 September 2026 | Hartlepool United | 0–1 | Everton U21 | Hartlepool |
| 19:00 BST (UTC+1) | | Report | Lambert 9' | Stadium: Victoria Park; Attendance: 205; Referee: James Westgate |

| 8 September 2026 | Solihull Moors | 2–3 | Leeds United U21 | Solihull |
| 19:00 BST (UTC+1) | Wodskou 10'; High 90+7' | Report | Vincent 19'; Lane 38', 73' | Stadium: Damson Park; Attendance: 543; Referee: Steven Copeland |

| 9 September 2026 | Tamworth | 1–3 | Middlesbrough U21 | Tamworth |
| 19:45 BST (UTC+1) | Calder 45' | Report | Carbon 47'; Ibeh 48', 51' | Stadium: The Lamb Ground; Attendance: 411; Referee: Gareth Rhodes |

| 23 September 2026 | Boreham Wood | 1–1 (2–4 p) | Everton U21 | Borehamwood |
| 19:00 BST (UTC+1) | Brunt 89' (pen.) | Report | Benjamin 73' | Stadium: Meadow Park; Referee: James Durkin |
| | Penalties |
| | Booty (penalty missed); Brunt (penalty scored); White (penalty scored); O'Connell (penalty missed) | | (penalty scored) Benjamin; (penalty missed) Foster; (penalty scored) Loney; (penalty scored) Gardner; (penalty scored) Carrington |

| 6 October 2026 | Solihull Moors | 2–1 | Newcastle United U21 | Solihull |
| 19:00 BST (UTC+1) | Wodskou 37'; Coffey 55' | Report | Seldon 4' | Stadium: Damson Park; Referee: Daniel Blades |

| 6 October 2026 | Tamworth | 1–0 | Leeds United U21 | Tamworth |
| 19:45 BST (UTC+1) | Dyson 43' | Report | | Stadium: The Lamb Ground; Attendance: 415; Referee: Stuart Morland |

| 13 October 2026 | Hartlepool United | 1–2 | Newcastle United U21 | Hartlepool |
| 19:00 BST (UTC+1) | Nolan 26' | Report | Thompson 9'; McNally 35' (o.g.) | Stadium: Victoria Park; Referee: Paul Marsden |

| 13 October 2026 | Solihull Moors | 1–0 | Everton U21 | Solihull |
| 19:00 BST (UTC+1) | Barnsley 79' (o.g.) | Report | | Stadium: Damson Park; Referee: Aaron Bannister |

| 20 October 2026 | Boreham Wood | 7–1 | Middlesbrough U21 | Borehamwood |
| 19:00 BST (UTC+1) | Cashman 6' (pen.), 56'; Allarkhia 21'; Dede 37' (o.g.); Bainbridge 70', 75'; Brunt 79' | Report | Coulson 60' | Stadium: Meadow Park; Referee: Jason Richardson |

| 3 November 2026 | Hartlepool United | 3–1 | Leeds United U21 | Hartlepool |
| 19:00 GMT | Bondo 25' (pen.), 70'; Popov 28' | Report | Hodja 75' | Stadium: Victoria Park; Referee: Andrew Miller |

| 3 November 2026 | Tamworth | 2–3 | Everton U21 | Tamworth |
| 19:45 GMT | Calder 24', 53' | Report | Finney 18'; Gomez 33'; Graham 59' | Stadium: The Lamb Ground; Referee: Niall Smith |

=== Group D ===
| Pos | Div | Team | Pld | W | PW | PL | L | GF | GA | GD | Pts | Qualification |
|---|---|---|---|---|---|---|---|---|---|---|---|---|
| 1 | NLS | Truro City | 4 | 4 | 0 | 0 | 0 | 10 | 2 | +8 | 12 | Advance to knockout stage |
| 2 | NL | Woking | 4 | 2 | 1 | 1 | 0 | 9 | 4 | +5 | 9 | Advance to knockout stage |
| 3 | NL | Sutton United | 4 | 1 | 2 | 1 | 0 | 4 | 3 | +1 | 8 | |
| 4 | ACA | West Bromwich Albion U21 | 4 | 1 | 1 | 0 | 2 | 3 | 4 | −1 | 5 | |
| 5 | ACA | Birmingham City U21 | 4 | 1 | 1 | 0 | 2 | 5 | 9 | −4 | 5 | |
| 6 | ACA | Southampton U21 | 4 | 1 | 0 | 1 | 2 | 8 | 11 | −3 | 4 | |
| 7 | NL | Boston United | 4 | 1 | 0 | 0 | 3 | 8 | 10 | −2 | 3 | |
| 8 | ACA | Leicester City U21 | 4 | 0 | 0 | 2 | 2 | 3 | 7 | −4 | 2 | |

Updated to match(es) played on 3 November 2026. Source: Premier League

| 18 August 2026 | Boston United | 2–3 | Birmingham City U21 | Boston |
| 19:00 BST (UTC+1) | Aboh 37'; Wheeldon 51' | Report | Reilly 70', 90+2'; McGreevy 75' | Stadium: Boston Community Stadium; Attendance: 425; Referee: Jamie Robinson |

| 18 August 2026 | Sutton United | 0–0 (3–1 p) | Leicester City U21 | Sutton |
| 19:00 BST (UTC+1) | | Report | | Stadium: Gander Green Lane; Attendance: 331; Referee: Tolu Sangowawa |
| | Penalties |
| | Osadebe (penalty scored); Francis (penalty scored); Babalola (penalty scored) | | (penalty scored) King; (penalty missed) Donnelly; (penalty missed) Gray; (penalty missed) Daniels |

| 18 August 2026 | Truro City | 2–1 | Southampton U21 | Truro |
| 19:00 BST (UTC+1) | Kinsey 53'; Stretton 89' | Report | Gathercole 90+1' | Stadium: Truro City Stadium; Attendance: 1,581; Referee: Sunny Gill |

| 18 August 2026 | Woking | 0–0 (1–4 p) | West Bromwich Albion U21 | Woking |
| 19:45 BST (UTC+1) | | Report | | Stadium: Kingfield Stadium; Referee: Alan Young |
| | Penalties |
| | Forster-Caskey (penalty missed); Ayres (penalty missed); Dulson (penalty scored) | | (penalty scored) Deeming; (penalty scored) French; (penalty scored) Colesby; (penalty scored) Parmar |

| 8 September 2026 | Boston United | 0–1 | West Bromwich Albion U21 | Boston |
| 19:00 BST (UTC+1) | | Report | Hammond 62' (o.g.) | Stadium: Boston Community Stadium; Attendance: 387; Referee: Kavan Hurn |

| 8 September 2026 | Sutton United | 1–1 (5–6 p) | Birmingham City U21 | Sutton |
| 19:00 BST (UTC+1) | Ogbonna 14' | Report | Maddox 85' | Stadium: Gander Green Lane; Attendance: 245; Referee: Aaron Farmer |
| | Penalties |
| | Mussa (penalty scored); Francis (penalty missed); Babalola (penalty missed); Folarin (penalty scored); Bell (penalty scored); Topalloj (penalty scored); Ogbonna (penalty scored); Nzuzi (penalty missed) | | (penalty missed) Quirk; (penalty scored) Burrell; (penalty missed) Mazwi; (penalty scored) Maddox; (penalty scored) Elmansuri; (penalty scored) Chahal; (penalty scored) McGreevy; (penalty scored) Warmington |

| 8 September 2026 | Truro City | 4–1 | Leicester City U21 | Truro |
| 19:00 BST (UTC+1) | Jephcott 4' (pen.), 29'; Johnson-Fisher 20', 49' | Report | De Lisle 22' | Stadium: Truro City Stadium; Attendance: 1,255; Referee: Richie Watkins |

| 8 September 2026 | Woking | 4–1 | Southampton U21 | Woking |
| 19:45 BST (UTC+1) | O'Brien 37'; Sohna 47'; Dulson 51'; Kayi Sanda 75' (o.g.) | Report | Day 45+2' | Stadium: Kingfield Stadium; Attendance: 232; Referee: Callum Jones |

| 13 October 2026 | Boston United | 5–6 | Southampton U21 | Boston |
| 19:00 BST (UTC+1) | Bostock 5'; Canavan 7', 34'; Aboh 16'; Rooney 86' | Report | Ehibhatiomhan 15', 30'; Sillah Dibaga 26'; Gathercole 48'; McMullan 59'; Akachukwu 70' | Stadium: Boston Community Stadium; Referee: Gareth Rhodes |

| 13 October 2026 | Sutton United | 3–2 | West Bromwich Albion U21 | Sutton |
| 19:00 BST (UTC+1) | Folarin 14'; Amartey 19'; Mussa 66' | Report | Parmar 9'; Seven-Seven 77' | Stadium: Gander Green Lane; Referee: Aji Ajibola |

| 13 October 2026 | Truro City | 3–0 | Birmingham City U21 | Truro |
| 19:00 BST (UTC+1) | Tweedy 13'; Starkie 59'; Greenslade 85' | Report | | Stadium: Truro City Stadium; Attendance: 1,172; Referee: James Durkin |

| 13 October 2026 | Woking | 2–2 (4–2 p) | Leicester City U21 | Woking |
| 19:45 BST (UTC+1) | Harris 58'; Kelly 65' | Report | Hutchinson 54'; Diallo 77' | Stadium: Kingfield Stadium; Referee: Matthew Scholes |
| | Penalties |
| | O'Brien (penalty scored); Sohna (penalty scored); Syla (penalty scored); Dulson (penalty missed); Adarkwa (penalty scored) | | (penalty missed) Hutchinson; (penalty scored) de Lisle; (penalty scored) King; (penalty scored) Anugo; (penalty missed) French |

| 3 November 2026 | Boston United | 1–0 | Leicester City U21 | Boston |
| 19:00 GMT | Wheeldon 37' | Report | | Stadium: Boston Community Stadium; Attendance: 243; Referee: James Oldham |

| 3 November 2026 | Sutton United | 0–0 (3–1 p) | Southampton U21 | Sutton |
| 19:00 GMT | | Report | | Stadium: Gander Green Lane; Attendance: 424; Referee: Abigail Byrne |
| | Penalties |
| | Mussa (penalty scored); Folarin (penalty missed); Njoku (penalty scored); Nightingale (penalty scored) | | (penalty missed) Comley; (penalty missed) Daley; (penalty scored) Linton; (penalty missed) Anderson |

| 3 November 2026 | Truro City | 1–0 | West Bromwich Albion U21 | Truro |
| 19:00 GMT | Bogle 86' | Report | | Stadium: Truro City Stadium; Attendance: 2,531; Referee: Alex Chilowicz |

| 3 November 2026 | Woking | 3–1 | Birmingham City U21 | Woking |
| 19:45 GMT | Dryer 3'; Dulson 12'; Adarkwa 62' | Report | Mazwi 49' | Stadium: Kingfield Stadium; Referee: Matthew Norton |
