= 2025 National League Cup final =

Association football match in England

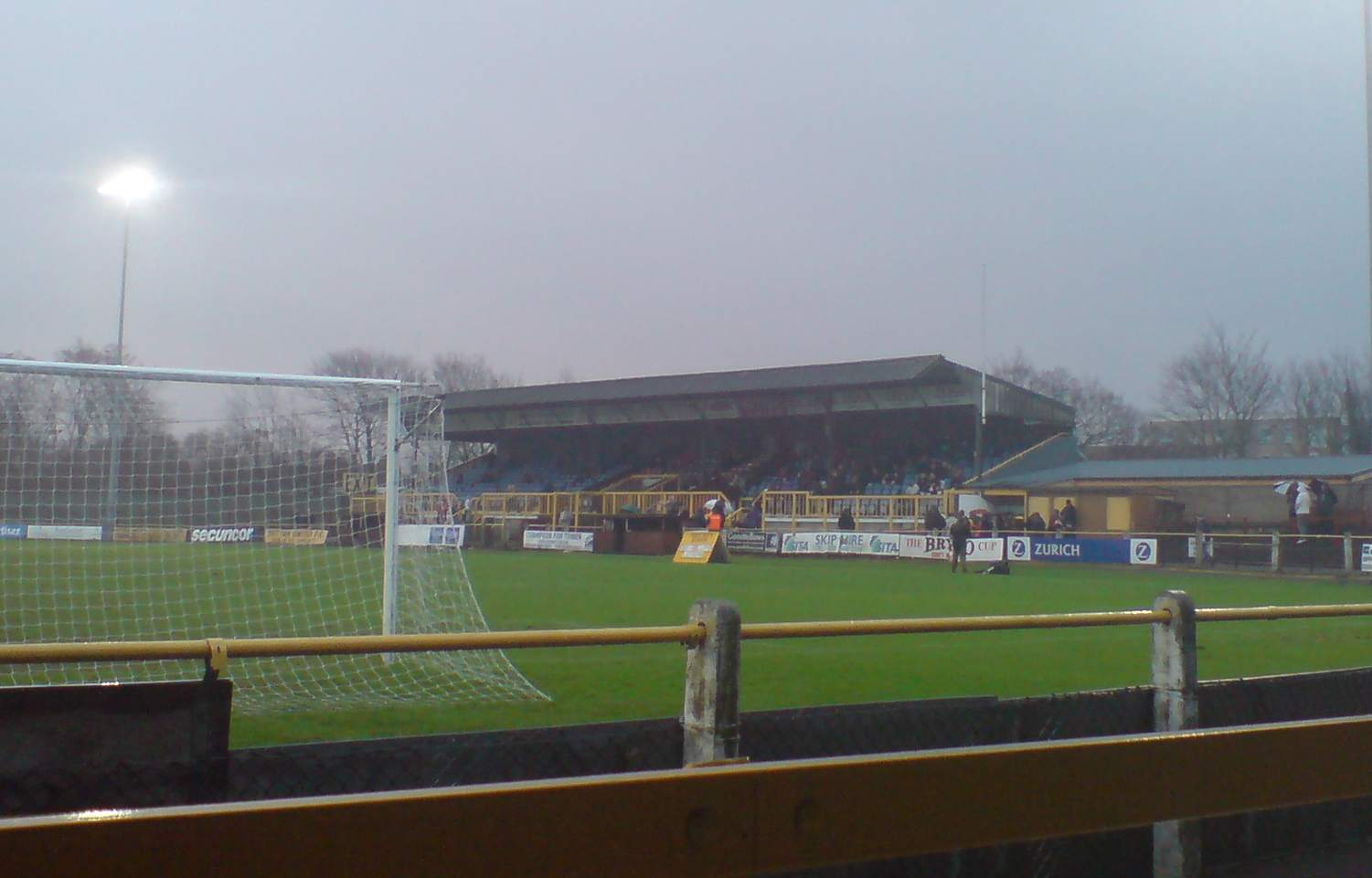
- The VBS Community Stadium hosted the final.
- Event: 2024–25 National League Cup
Sutton United	Leeds United U21
1	2
- Date: 29 April 2025
- Venue: VBS Community Stadium, London (Sutton)
- Referee: Sam Mulhall
- Attendance: 3,062

The 2025 National League Cup final was an association football match. It was played on 29 April 2025 between Premier League 2 side Leeds United U21 and National League side Sutton United and decided the winners of the relaunched 2024–25 National League Cup, a knock-out tournament comprising clubs from National League and Premier League 2

== Route to the final ==
Note: In all results below, the score of the finalist is given first (H: home; A: away).

Leeds United U21		Round	Sutton United	
Opponent	Result	Group stage	Opponent	Result
Boston United	3–4 (A)	Matchday 1	Tottenham Hotspur	3–0 (H)
Gateshead	1–2 (A)	Matchday 2	West Ham United U21	0–2 (H)
FC Halifax Town	2–2 (A) (3–5p.)	Matchday 3	West Bromwich Albion U21	2–2 (H) (3–1p.)
Tamworth	2–1 (A)	Matchday 4	Nottingham Forest U21	3–2 (H)
Group C: Pos / Team / Pld / Pts; 1 / Newcastle United U21 / 4 / 8; 2 / Leeds United U21 / 4 / 8; 3 / Boston United / 4 / 8; 4 / Middlesbrough U21 / 4 / 7; 5 / Gateshead / 4 / 5; Source: Premier League		Final standings	Group D: Pos / Team / Pld / Pts; 1 / Braintree Town / 4 / 12; 2 / Sutton United / 4 / 8; 3 / Dagenham & Redbridge / 4 / 7; 4 / West Ham United U21 / 4 / 6; 5 / Ebbsfleet United / 4 / 5; Source: Premier League	
Opponent	Result	Knockout stage	Opponent	Result
Aldershot Town	1–3 (A)	Quarter-final	Manchester United U21	3–0 (H)
Altrincham	1–2 (A)	Semi-final	Braintree Town	0–0 (A) (4–5p.)

=== Leeds United U21 ===
Leeds United U21's 2024–25 National League Cup campaign commenced in the group stage, competing in Group C along with Boston United, FC Halifax Town, Gateshead, teams from the Middlesbrough U21, Newcastle United U21, Sunderland U21 and Tamworth. All their matches against the National League teams. At the Matchday 1, they faced Boston United, which they won that dramatic match 3–4 with Green's own goal in 15th minute, Thomas's brace in 54th and 85th minute, and Cresswell's goal in 83rd minute. At their next match, they took on Gateshead, and they scored very fast, with Reece Chadwick-Chaplin's goal at second minute, but Kain Adom equalised at 40th minute, four minutes after half-time Connor Douglas scored a second goal, and Leeds won 2–1, at the third match they challenged FC Halifax Town, which they drew 2–2, but they won at penalties 3–5. If Leeds United U21 win the last match again Tamworth, they will end placed first, but they lost with Digie, and Thsikuna goals, while Cian Coleman scored for Leeds, but they failed to equalize, and got drawn with Group A winner, Aldershot Town, they were chasing the game 1–0 after Kai Corbett's goal, but brace by Chadwick-Chaplin, changed the game, and Leeds took 1–2 lead, and Oliver Pickles's goal sealed Aldershot's loss. At semi-finals the took on Altrincham, which Diogo Monteiro scored right before the half-time, and Josh McDonald doubled the lead, but Justin Amaluzor's goal kept Altrincham's fans hopes, but nothing more happened, and Leeds qualified to the final, and they will face Sutton.

=== Sutton United ===
Sutton were placed in Group D for the group stage, alongside Braintree Town, Dagenham & Redbridge, Ebbsfleet United, and teams from the Nottingham Forest U21, Tottenham Hotspur U21, West Bromwich Albion U21 and West Ham United U21. All their matches against the youth teams will be played at their home ground, the VBS Community Stadium. In their opening match they faced Tottenham Hotspur U21, within eight minutes, the Ambers took the lead with Simper's goal, which they carried their one-goal lead until the half-time, then at the 51st minute thanks to Williams, they raised the lead to 2–0, and in stoppage time Sutton defender Harry Ransom sealed Spurs loss, and the match ended 3–0, in their next match they faced West Ham United U21, after half an hour Joshua Ajala of West Ham United U21 won a in-box matchup against Sam Roberts, which ended up a goal for the West Ham, 53 minutes later Junior Robinson, raised it to 0–2 for West Ham, and Sutton lost the game. At the Matchday 3, against the West Bromwich Albion U21, Sutton unfortunately conceded Souleyman Mandey's goal, and they were chasing the game for about ten minutes, while Nana Boateng equalised the game with his goal, and five minutes later Josh Coley scored a 2–1 goal for Sutton, and took the lead, which they carried for the half-time, but in the half, at the 55th Souleyman Mandey of West Brom equalised, and took the game to penalties, which resulted in Sutton's win, 3–1 after penalties, as Mat Williams missed the deciding penalty, so Sutton still has a chance of qualifying to the quarter-finals, if they defeat Nottingham Forest U21 at home, which Sutton United took the lead at 10th minute with Dillon De Silva's goal, and they doubled the lead at 16th minute, thanks to Alex Kirk's goal, but Nottingham Forest U21's Kristian Fletcher scored a contact goal, and Sutton led 2–1 at half-time, 30 minutes later at the second half, Nana Boateng scored a 3–1 goal, then Forest's Kyle McAdam scored at a stoppage time a 3-2 goal, but it was too late for Forest to equalize, and Sutton won, in final they got placed second and qualified with Braintree Town to the quarter-finals. They got drawn with the Group B winners Manchester United U21, which Sutton defeated them 3–0 after Barbrook, Boateng and Wadham's goals at 27th, 66th and 68th minute, and qualified to the semi-finals to play with their Group D rivals, Braintree Town, who eliminated Brighton U21, 2–1. At that match, against Braintree Town and Sutton, nothing much happened as a tense match, and resulted in the penalty shootout, which Sutton United player Eduino Vaz scored a deciding penalty, which made the Ambers qualify to the final, and Sutton goalkeeper Jack Sims was the hero of the shootout, saving three penalties.

== Match ==
=== Details ===
29 April 2025
19:00

Sutton United	1–2	Leeds United U21
Simper 77'	Report	Monteiro 25'; Gray 56'

VBS Community Stadium, Sutton
Attendance: 3,062
Referee: Sam Mulhall

Sutton United	Leeds United U21

GK	1	(England) Jack Sims
RB	22	(England) Ryan Jackson		(substituted off) 61'
CB	15	(England) Hayden Muller
CB	5	(England) Harry Ransom
LB	33	(Kosovo) Besart Topalloj
CM	20	(England) Jack Wadham
CM	6	(England) Siju Odelusi
RW	24	(England) Ashley Nadesan	(yellow card) 78'
AM	8	(England) Lewis Simper
LW	17	(England) Nana Boateng	(yellow card) 35'	(substituted on) 46'
CF	9	(England) Will Davies (c)
Substitutes:
GK	31	(England) Matt Kerbey
DF	4	(England) Tyler French		(substituted on) 61'
DF	12	(Guinea-Bissau) Eduino Vaz
DF	27	(England) Vinnie Tume
MF	11	(Sri Lanka) Dillon De Silva		(substituted on) 46'
MF	30	(England) Alex Woodyard
Manager:
(Wales) Steve Morison

GK	1	(Scotland) Rory Mahady	(yellow card) 78'
CB	5	(England) James Debayo
CB	4	(Portugal) Diogo Monteiro
CB	6	(England) Kris Moore
RM	2	(England) Connor Douglas
CM	8	(England) Alfie Cresswell (c)
CM	10	(England) Reece Chadwick	(yellow card) 90+1'
LM	3	(England) Connor Ferguson	(yellow card) 78'	(substituted off) 86'
RW	7	(England) Harvey Vincent		(substituted off) 76'
CF	9	(England) Harry Gray		(substituted off) 90+4'
LW	11	(Scotland) Joshua McDonald		(substituted off) 26'
Substitutes:
GK	12	(England) Owen Grainger
DF	19	(England) Coban Bird
MF	14	(England) Joseph Richards		(substituted on) 86'
MF	16	(England) Reuben Lopata-White
MF	17	(England) Joseph Snowdon		(substituted on) 76'
MF	18	(England) Oliver Pickles		(substituted on) 26'
FW	15	(England) Brooklyn Nfonkeu		(substituted on) 90+4'
Manager:
(England) Scott Gardner

Match rules

- 90 minutes
- Penalty shoot-out if necessary
- Seven named substitutes
- Maximum of five substitutions
