= 2026–27 Professional U21 Development League =

Youth Football League in England

Premier League 2
- Season: 2026–27
- Dates: 21 August 2026 – 12 April 2027
- Matches: 96
- Goals: 385 (4.01 per match)
- Top goalscorer: (England) Princewill Ehibhatiomhan (Southampton U21s) (9 Goals)
- Biggest home win: Manchester United U21s 5–0 Ipswich Town U21s (24 August 2026); Ipswich Town U21s 5–0 Birmingham City U21s (23 October 2026)
- Biggest away win: Newcastle United U21s 0–4 Fulham U21s (31 August 2026); Birmingham City U21s 0–4 Derby County U21s (19 October 2026)
- Highest scoring: Cobham Next Gen U21s 5–4 West Ham United U21s (31 August 2026)
- Longest winning run: 5 Games; Southampton U21s
- Longest unbeaten run: 6 Games; Tottenham Hotspur U21s; Southampton U21s; Cobham Next Gen U21s
- Longest winless run: 7 Games; Middlesbrough U21s
- Longest losing run: 4 Games; Stoke City U21s
- Highest attendance: 5,645; Newcastle United U21s 3–2 Sunderland U21s (26 October 2026)
- Lowest attendance: 50; Birmingham City U21s 4–3 Arsenal U21s (18 September 2026); Ipswich Town U21s 5–0 Birmingham City U21s (23 October 2026)
- Total attendance: 28,521
- Average attendance: 356
- All statistics correct as of 9 November 2026.

The 2026–27 Premier League 2 is the 15th season of the Professional Development League system. It continues to use the same format as the previous 3 seasons. 31 teams will compete in this season, the most in league history. Bournemouth U21s, and Brentford U21s joined after being promoted to Category One status after 3, and 2 seasons as Category Two Academies respectively. The Chelsea Under-21 team are now known as Cobham Next Gen.

== Premier League 2 ==
=== Table ===
Pos	Team	Pld	W	D	L	GF	GA	GD	Pts	
1	Southampton U21s	6	5	1	0	17	6	+11	16	Qualification to the Elimination Playoffs and Premier League International Cup
2	Cobham Next Gen U21s	7	5	1	1	20	12	+8	16	Qualification to the Elimination Playoffs and Premier League International Cup
3	Tottenham Hotspur U21s	7	5	1	1	18	11	+7	16	Qualification to the Elimination Playoffs and Premier League International Cup
4	Fulham U21s	7	4	1	2	20	15	+5	13	Qualification to the Elimination Playoffs and Premier League International Cup
5	Norwich City U21s	7	4	1	2	16	15	+1	13	Qualification to the Elimination Playoffs and Premier League International Cup
6	Nottingham Forest U21s	7	4	1	2	13	13	0	13	Qualification to the Elimination Playoffs and Premier League International Cup
7	Liverpool U21s	6	3	2	1	11	6	+5	11	Qualification to the Elimination Playoffs and Premier League International Cup
8	Reading U21s	7	3	2	2	10	9	+1	11	Qualification to the Elimination Playoffs and Premier League International Cup
9	Manchester United U21s	5	3	1	1	15	7	+8	10	Qualification to the Elimination Playoffs and Premier League International Cup
10	Leeds United U21s	6	3	1	2	17	14	+3	10	Qualification to the Elimination Playoffs and Premier League International Cup
11	Sunderland U21s	7	3	1	3	18	16	+2	10	Qualification to the Elimination Playoffs and Premier League International Cup
12	Bournemouth U21s	7	3	1	3	15	18	−3	10	Qualification to the Elimination Playoffs and Premier League International Cup
13	Everton U21s	6	2	3	1	7	5	+2	9	Qualification to the Elimination Playoffs and Premier League International Cup
14	Brentford U21s	7	3	0	4	15	15	0	9	Qualification to the Elimination Playoffs and Premier League International Cup
15	West Ham United U21s	7	2	3	2	12	12	0	9	Qualification to the Elimination Playoffs and Premier League International Cup
16	Blackburn Rovers U21s	5	3	0	2	10	10	0	9	Qualification to the Elimination Playoffs and Premier League International Cup
17	Crystal Palace U21s	6	2	2	2	10	9	+1	8	Qualification to the PL2/PDL Playoffs
18	Derby County U21s	7	2	2	3	17	17	0	8	Qualification to the PL2/PDL Playoffs
19	Brighton & Hove Albion U21s	6	2	2	2	14	14	0	8	Qualification to the PL2/PDL Playoffs
20	Aston Villa U21s	6	2	2	2	10	13	−3	8	Qualification to the PL2/PDL Playoffs
21	Arsenal U21s	7	1	4	2	12	15	−3	7	Qualification to the PL2/PDL Playoffs
22	Manchester City U21s	4	2	0	2	11	9	+2	6	Qualification to the PL2/PDL Playoffs
23	Ipswich Town U21s	4	2	0	2	11	10	+1	6	Qualification to the PL2/PDL Playoffs
24	Wolverhampton Wanderers U21s	5	2	0	3	4	11	−7	6	Qualification to the PL2/PDL Playoffs
25	Leicester City U21s	6	1	2	3	7	12	−5	5	
26	Stoke City U21s	7	1	1	5	12	15	−3	4	
27	Burnley U21s	7	1	1	5	10	14	−4	4	
28	Newcastle United U21s	5	1	1	3	5	12	−7	4	
29	Middlesbrough U21s	7	0	3	4	10	15	−5	3	
30	Birmingham City U21s	6	0	3	3	7	18	−11	3	
31	West Bromwich Albion U21s	5	0	1	4	11	17	−6	1	

Updated to match(es) played on 9 November 2026. Source: Premier League 2 Table

=== Matches ===
Home \ Away	ARS	AVL	BIR	BLB	BOU	BRE	BHA	BUR	CNG	CRY	DER	EVE	FUL	IPS	LEE	LEI	LIV	MNC	MNU	MID	NEW	NOR	NFO	REA	SOU	STK	SUN	TOT	WBA	WHU	WOL
Arsenal U21s	—	5–2	—	—	19 Feb	—	—	—	1–4	1–1	5 Mar	—	15 Jan	—	12 Mar	—	—	20 Dec	—	—	13 Dec	—	—	—	—	—	2–2	—	—	—	—
Aston Villa U21s	—	—	5 Mar	—	—	—	2–1	—	26 Feb	0–2	—	—	—	—	2 Apr	—	—	—	12 Dec	2–2	8 Jan	—	—	—	—	5 Feb	—	—	—	—	22 Jan
Birmingham City U21s	0–0	—	—	—	—	—	—	—	—	—	0–4	—	—	—	26 Feb	—	—	14 Dec	—	—	18 Jan	—	8 Feb	21 Dec	12 Feb	22 Mar	—	—	—	2–2	—
Blackburn Rovers U21s	30 Nov	18 Jan	—	—	—	—	—	—	—	—	—	—	—	—	25 Jan	—	—	—	12 Apr	15 Mar	—	14 Dec	—	2–3	—	—	—	8 Mar	4–2	—	22 Feb
Bournemouth U21s	—	—	—	—	—	3–4	—	—	2–1	—	15 Jan	1 Mar	—	—	—	—	15 Feb	—	15 Mar	3–1	—	—	—	30 Nov	—	2–1	14 Dec	—	—	—	—
Brentford U21s	—	—	10 Jan	14 Feb	—	—	—	24 Jan	—	20 Dec	—	0–2	1–2	—	—	—	14 Mar	—	—	—	—	—	—	—	—	—	5–1	21 Feb	—	—	0–2
Brighton & Hove Albion U21s	2–2	—	—	—	3–3	26 Feb	—	6 Mar	—	7 Feb	—	—	—	—	—	3–0	—	—	—	—	21 Mar	—	—	17 Jan	29 Nov	—	—	—	—	—	9 Jan
Burnley U21s	—	0–1	—	19 Mar	—	—	—	—	—	—	4–1	—	—	—	—	8 Jan	—	26 Feb	1–1	18 Dec	—	—	—	1–3	7 Feb	—	—	—	12 Feb	—	—
Cobham Next Gen U21s	—	—	19 Feb	—	—	5 Feb	—	12 Mar	—	—	—	—	3–1	—	—	—	2–2	—	—	—	5 Mar	—	22 Jan	—	—	—	8 Jan	—	—	5–4	11 Dec
Crystal Palace U21s	—	—	—	0–1	—	—	—	14 Dec	—	—	—	1–1	—	15 Feb	—	—	—	24 Jan	—	—	1 Mar	2 Apr	11 Jan	—	2–5	—	—	—	—	19 Mar	—
Derby County U21s	—	—	—	1 Mar	—	—	12 Apr	—	—	—	—	—	14 Dec	30 Nov	15 Feb	—	—	—	—	—	—	3–4	15 Mar	—	11 Jan	—	—	1–3	4–4	—	—
Everton U21s	—	—	—	—	—	—	—	—	—	—	—	—	—	—	30 Nov	—	1–1	—	—	2–1	—	12 Feb	—	—	1–2	—	5 Mar	19 Mar	21 Dec	22 Jan	9 Apr
Fulham U21s	—	3–3	—	8 Jan	22 Jan	—	2–4	4–3	—	—	—	—	—	—	—	—	—	9 Mar	26 Feb	—	—	—	27 Nov	—	—	—	—	12 Feb	5 Mar	—	—
Ipswich Town U21s	—	19 Feb	5–0	4–1	—	—	—	16 Jan	—	—	—	8 Jan	—	—	—	—	2 Apr	5 Mar	—	—	—	—	—	5 Feb	—	—	—	—	—	27 Feb	12 Mar
Leeds United U21s	—	—	—	—	5–1	12 Dec	—	22 Feb	—	1–4	—	—	—	8 Mar	—	—	—	6 Feb	—	—	2–0	—	—	—	—	—	22 Mar	8 Jan	4–3	—	—
Leicester City U21s	4–1	30 Nov	—	1 Feb	—	5 Mar	—	—	21 Dec	—	—	5 Feb	—	19 Mar	15 Jan	—	—	—	—	—	—	—	—	—	—	—	12 Feb	—	—	0–0	—
Liverpool U21s	20 Mar	19 Dec	28 Nov	—	—	—	5–1	—	—	6 Mar	23 Jan	—	—	—	2–1	—	—	—	6 Feb	—	—	—	20 Feb	1–0	—	—	—	—	—	—	—
Manchester City U21s	—	—	—	—	9 Apr	—	19 Feb	—	—	—	—	15 Jan	—	—	—	—	11 Jan	—	5 Apr	12 Feb	—	—	—	—	12 Mar	4–3	—	—	27 Nov	—	4–0
Manchester United U21s	—	—	—	—	—	3–2	—	—	15 Feb	30 Nov	21 Mar	19 Feb	—	5–0	—	4–1	—	—	—	8 Mar	—	—	—	—	—	10 Jan	—	—	—	17 Jan	—
Middlesbrough U21s	—	—	—	—	—	—	24 Jan	—	21 Mar	—	1–1	—	21 Feb	—	4–4	11 Dec	—	—	—	—	—	0–1	11 Apr	28 Feb	—	—	—	1–2	—	—	—
Newcastle United U21s	—	—	—	—	21 Dec	30 Nov	—	—	—	—	22 Feb	—	0–4	25 Jan	—	15 Mar	—	12 Apr	—	—	—	8 Feb	—	—	—	—	3–2	1–3	—	—	—
Norwich City U21s	22 Jan	—	4–2	—	5 Mar	—	12 Mar	—	27 Nov	—	—	—	—	19 Dec	—	19 Feb	15 Jan	—	—	—	—	—	—	—	—	0–0	—	—	—	4–2	—
Nottingham Forest U21s	—	22 Mar	—	—	—	16 Jan	12 Feb	1–0	—	—	—	11 Dec	—	—	—	2–2	—	2–1	3–2	—	—	—	—	—	5 Mar	26 Feb	—	—	—	—	—
Reading U21s	8 Jan	15 Feb	—	—	—	—	—	—	—	—	1–3	0–0	—	—	—	—	—	—	22 Jan	—	1–1	—	2–1	—	—	7 Mar	—	—	19 Mar	15 Dec	—
Southampton U21s	9 Apr	—	—	—	3–1	19 Mar	—	—	—	—	—	—	—	6 Apr	—	26 Feb	—	—	18 Dec	—	—	5–2	—	19 Feb	—	12 Dec	—	15 Jan	—	—	—
Stoke City U21s	—	—	—	18 Dec	—	2–3	—	9 Apr	1–2	15 Jan	—	12 Mar	1–4	—	—	22 Jan	—	—	—	—	—	—	—	—	—	—	—	—	—	12 Feb	4–0
Sunderland U21s	—	—	25 Jan	1–2	—	—	—	—	—	12 Mar	—	—	21 Dec	4–2	—	—	27 Feb	—	—	5 Feb	—	3–1	5–1	—	—	30 Nov	—	—	—	—	—
Tottenham Hotspur U21s	5 Feb	—	3–3	—	—	—	21 Dec	—	1–3	—	—	—	—	11 Apr	—	2–0	—	4–2	—	—	—	1 Mar	—	15 Mar	—	—	—	—	22 Jan	—	—
West Bromwich Albion U21s	—	9 Apr	12 Mar	—	5 Feb	—	11 Dec	—	15 Jan	19 Feb	—	—	—	—	—	—	29 Jan	—	—	—	2 Apr	9 Jan	1–3	—	—	—	—	—	—	—	—
West Ham United U21s	—	—	—	5 Feb	—	—	—	3–1	—	—	—	—	12 Mar	—	18 Dec	—	1–0	—	—	8 Jan	—	—	—	—	0–0	—	19 Feb	27 Nov	—	—	5 Mar
Wolverhampton Wanderers U21s	1 Mar	—	12 Apr	—	19 Mar	—	—	—	—	—	21 Dec	—	8 Feb	—	—	—	—	—	—	30 Nov	12 Feb	—	—	—	0–2	—	18 Jan	—	2–1	—	—

Updated to match(es) played on 9 November 2026. Source: Premier League 2 Results
Legend: Blue = home team win; Yellow = draw; Red = away team win.

=== Top goalscorers ===
As of 8 November 2026

Rank	Player	Club	Goals
1	(England) Princewill Ehibhatiomhan	Southampton U21s	9
2	(Belgium) Trey Samuel-Ogunsuyi	Sunderland U21s	7
3	(England) Carrick Njinko	Leeds United U21s	6
3	(England) Will Wright	Liverpool U21s	6
5	(England) Dan Casey	Fulham U21s	5
5	(England) Cruz Ibeh	Middlesbrough U21s	5
5	(Jamaica) Tyrese Hall	Tottenham Hotspur U21s	5
5	(England) Luke Towler	Norwich City U21s	5
5	(England) Reggie Watson	Cobham Next Gen U21s	5
5	(Cameroon) Macaulay Zepa	Fulham U21s	5

=== Hat-tricks ===
As of 26 October 2026

Player	For	Against	Result	Date	Ref.
(England) Carrick Njinko	Leeds United U21s	West Bromwich Albion U21s	4–3 (H)	23 August 2026	
(Belgium) Trey Samuel-Ogunsuyi	Sunderland U21s	Nottingham Forest U21s	5–1 (H)	24 August 2026	
(Scotland) Josh Landers^{4}	West Ham United U21s	Cobham Next Gen U21s	5–4 (A)	31 August 2026	
(Belgium) Kaye Furo	Brentford U21s	Sunderland U21s	4–1 (H)	31 August 2026	
(England) Cruz Ibeh	Middlesbrough U21s	Leeds United U21s	4–4 (H)	13 September 2026	
(Portugal) Adler Nascimento	Crystal Palace U21s	Leeds United U21s	1–4 (A)	18 October 2026	
(England) Princewill Ehibhatiomhan	Southampton U21s	Crystal Palace U21s	2–5 (A)	26 October 2026	

(H) – Home; (A) – Away
^{4} – player scored 4 goals

== Awards ==
=== Player of the Month ===
Month	Player	Club	Ref.
August	(Belgium) Kaye Furo	Brentford U21s	
September	(England) Reggie Watson	Cobham Next Gen U21s	
October	(Jamaica) Tyrese Hall	Tottenham Hotspur U21s	

== Professional Development League ==
Professional Development League 2
- Season: 2026–27
- Dates: 14 August 2026 – 14 April 2027
- Matches: 76
- Goals: 305 (4.01 per match)
- Top goalscorer: (England) Cole Simms (Wigan Athletic U21s) (10 Goals)
- Biggest home win: Bolton Wanderers U21s 7–0 Colchester United U21s (25 August 2026)
- Biggest away win: Fleetwood Town U21s 0–4 Colchester United U21s (14 August 2026); Queens Park Rangers U21s 1–5 Coventry City U21s (6 October 2026); Peterborough United U21s 0–4 Sheffield United U21s (13 October 2026); Bolton Wanderers U21s 2–6 Huddersfield Town U21s (27 October 2026); Colchester United U21s 0–4 Charlton Athletic U21s (10 November 2026)
- Highest scoring: Wigan Athletic U21s 6–4 Colchester United U21s (15 September 2026)
- Longest winning run: (6 Games); Bolton Wanderers U21s
- Longest unbeaten run: (7 Games); Cardiff City U21s
- Longest winless run: (6 Games); Barnsley U21s; Sheffield Wednesday U21s
- Longest losing run: (4 Games); Millwall U21s
- All statistics correct as of 18 November 2026.

The Professional Development League, sometimes known as the Professional Development League 2, is Under-21 football's second tier, designed for those academies with Category 2 status.

17 teams compete in the league this season, three fewer than the previous season and tied for the lowest amount of teams in the league's history. Two teams joined the Premier League 2 with Category One status with Bournemouth U21s, and Brentford U21s joined after being promoted to Category One status after 3, and 2 seasons as Category Two Academies respectively, with Brentford playing 6 seasons in the league total. While 2 Academies downgraded themselves to Category Three, with founding member Crewe Alexandra U21s after 14 seasons, alongside Watford U21s after 11 seasons. However, Bolton Wanderers U21s returned after being granted Category Two academy status after 6 years.

=== Table ===
Pos	Team	Pld	W	D	L	GF	GA	GD	Pts	
1	Bolton Wanderers U21s	10	7	1	2	25	13	+12	22	Qualification for PL2/PDL Playoffs
2	Fleetwood Town U21s	10	6	1	3	13	16	−3	19	Qualification for PL2/PDL Playoffs
3	Swansea City U21s	10	6	0	4	20	15	+5	18	Qualification for PL2/PDL Playoffs
4	Coventry City U21s	9	4	2	3	19	15	+4	14	Qualification for PL2/PDL Playoffs
5	Cardiff City U21s	9	3	4	2	20	14	+6	13	Qualification for PL2/PDL Playoffs
6	Sheffield United U21s	8	4	1	3	13	8	+5	13	Qualification for PL2/PDL Playoffs
7	Wigan Athletic U21s	10	3	4	3	24	27	−3	13	Qualification for PL2/PDL Playoffs
8	Huddersfield Town U21s	6	4	0	2	19	11	+8	12	Qualification for PL2/PDL Playoffs
9	Bristol City U21s	9	3	3	3	20	19	+1	12	
10	Charlton Athletic U21s	10	3	3	4	20	19	+1	12	
11	Peterborough United U21s	9	3	3	3	17	22	−5	12	
12	Hull City U21s	8	3	2	3	16	15	+1	11	
13	Queens Park Rangers U21s	11	3	2	6	19	28	−9	11	
14	Colchester United U21s	9	3	0	6	19	26	−7	9	
15	Barnsley U21s	9	2	2	5	18	27	−9	8	
16	Sheffield Wednesday U21s	9	1	4	4	15	20	−5	7	
17	Millwall U21s	6	2	0	4	8	10	−2	6	

Updated to match(es) played on 18 November 2026. Source: Professional Development League table

=== Matches ===
Home \ Away	BAR	BOL	BRI	CAR	CHA	COL	COV	FLE	HUD	HUL	MIL	PET	QPR	SHU	SHW	SWA	WIG
Barnsley U21s	—	23 Nov	11 Apr		2–2			20 Dec	21 Feb	0–2	5 Jan	3–6		0–2	25 Jan	19 Mar	2–4
Bolton Wanderers U21s	9 Feb	—	6 Apr			7–0	3–1	2 Feb	2–6	16 Feb		12 Jan	3–1	23 Feb	2 Mar		22 Dec
Bristol City U21s			—	15 Dec	4–1	8 Jan	23 Feb	23 Mar		4–1	1–3		12 Jan	3–1		9 Feb	2–2
Cardiff City U21s	1–2	13 Apr	2 Feb	—	12 Jan	1 Dec	2–2		2 Mar		9 Feb	6–0	16 Feb		0–0	27 Nov	
Charlton Athletic U21s		0–1	16 Feb	3–4	—	9 Feb	24 Nov	13 Apr		23 Mar	1–0		1 Dec	3–1		19 Jan	2–2
Colchester United U21s	3–4		26 Jan	23 Feb	0–4	—	15 Dec		13 Apr		12 Jan	23 Mar	5–1		2–1	1–2	
Coventry City U21s	5–3		1 Dec	19 Jan	26 Jan	1–0	—	1–2		13 Apr	16 Feb	5 Apr	0–2		16 Mar	2–0	
Fleetwood Town U21s	2–2	9 Mar		6 Apr		0–4		—	26 Jan	19 Jan	1–0	16 Feb		15 Dec	3–1	2–1	30 Mar
Huddersfield Town U21s	23 Mar	15 Dec	16 Mar		6 Apr		8 Jan	1 Dec	—	5 Feb		26 Feb	3–1	12 Jan	9 Mar		16 Feb
Hull City U21s	6 Mar	1–2		16 Mar		6 Apr		3–0	22 Dec	—	5 Jan	9 Feb		1 Dec	12 Jan	0–2	2–2
Millwall U21s		0–3	19 Jan	3–0	15 Dec	2 Feb	2 Mar		2–4		—		26 Jan	6 Apr		23 Feb	16 Mar
Peterborough United U21s	15 Dec	1–1	3–3		16 Mar			0–1	20 Jan	25 Nov	14 Apr	—	2–0	0–4	2–2		26 Jan
Queens Park Rangers U21s	16 Mar		3–1	1–1	23 Feb	19 Jan	1–5	4–1		3–3	26 Feb		—		9 Apr	15 Dec	
Sheffield United U21s	16 Feb	2–0		1–1		15 Mar	19 Mar	0–1	17 Nov	26 Jan		9 Mar	13 Apr	—	30 Mar		19 Jan
Sheffield Wednesday U21s	1 Dec	19 Jan	1–1		2–2			23 Feb	2–5	2–4	21 Mar	22 Dec		9 Feb	—	14 Apr	4–1
Swansea City U21s		15 Mar	4–1	25 Jan	3–2	16 Feb	11 Jan		2–0		30 Nov	2–3	4–2	0–2		—	5 Apr
Wigan Athletic U21s	12 Jan	1–3		2–5		6–4	2–2	9 Feb	2–1	23 Feb		8 Dec	23 Mar	20 Apr	15 Dec		—

Updated to match(es) played on 18 November 2026. Source: Professional Development League Results
Legend: Blue = home team win; Yellow = draw; Red = away team win.

=== Top goalscorers ===
As of 6 November 2026

Rank	Player	Club	Goals
1	(England) Cole Simms	Wigan Athletic U21s	10
2	(Nigeria) Adrian Akande	Colchester United U21s	7
3	(Wales) Yori Griffith	Swansea City U21s	6
3	(England) Daeshon Lawrence	Bolton Wanderers U21s	6
3	(England) Ellis McMillan	Charlton Athletic U21s	6
6	(Northern Ireland) Chris Conn-Clarke	Peterborough United U21s	5
6	(Wales) Jake Davies	Cardiff City U21s	5
6	(Scotland) Chris Eadie	Sheffield United U21s	5
6	(England) Max Lott	Bolton Wanderers U21s	5
6	(England) Kai Enslin	Charlton Athletic U21s	5
6	(England) George Shepherd	Coventry City U21s	5

=== Hat-tricks ===
As of 28 October 2026

Player	For	Against	Result	Date	Ref.
(England) Emmerson Sutton	Queens Park Rangers U21s	Fleetwood Town U21s	4–1 (H)	13 September 2026	
(Jamaica) Kurtis Simmons	Peterborough United U21s	Bristol City U21s	3–3 (H)	15 September 2026	
(England) Cole Simms	Wigan Athletic U21s	Colchester United U21s	6–4 (H)	15 September 2026	
(Nigeria) Adrian Akande	Colchester United U21s	Wigan Athletic U21s	6–4 (A)	15 September 2026	
(England) George Shepherd	Coventry City U21s	Queens Park Rangers U21s	1–5 (A)	6 October 2026	
(Northern Ireland) Chris Conn-Clarke^{5}	Peterborough United U21s	Barnsley U21s	3–6 (A)	26 October 2026	
(England) Leon Chiwome	Colchester United U21s	Queens Park Rangers U21s	5–1 (H)	27 October 2026	
(Wales) Yori Griffith	Swansea City U21s	Bristol City U21s	4–1 (H)	6 November 2026	
(England) Reece Greenhalgh	Wigan Athletic U21s	Barnsley U21s	2–4 (A)	17 November 2026	

Note

(H) – Home; (A) – Away
^{5} – player scored 5 goals
