= Ben Chapman (footballer, born 1998) =

English footballer

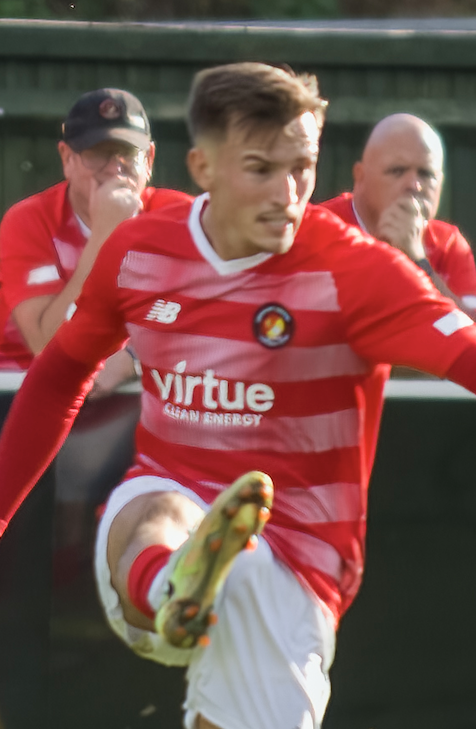
- Ben Chapman playing for Ebbsfleet United in 2022

Personal information
- Full name: Benjamin Scott Chapman
- Date of birth: 31 December 1998 (age 27)
- Place of birth: Aylesford, England
- Height: 1.75 m (5 ft 9 in)
- Position: Central midfielder

Team information
- Current team: Ebbsfleet United
- Number: 22

Youth career
- Crystal Palace
- Bearsted
- Gillingham

Senior career*
Years	Team	Apps	(Gls)
2017–2019	Gillingham	3	(0)
2018	→ Faversham Town (loan)		
2019–2020	Dulwich Hamlet	20	(0)
2020–	Ebbsfleet United	198	(16)

International career
2024	England C	1	(0)
- * Club domestic league appearances and goals as of 18:08, 8 March 2020 (UTC)

Benjamin Scott Chapman (born 31 December 1998) is an English professional footballer who plays as a central midfielder for National League South club Ebbsfleet United.

== Club career ==
Born in Aylesford, Chapman had stints at Crystal Palace and Bearsted's youth setups before graduating with Gillingham. On 14 March 2017, he signed a professional deal with the club. He made his professional debut on 8 August 2017, coming on as a substitute for Jake Hessenthaler in a 2–0 away loss against Reading in the EFL Cup.

Chapman was offered a new contract by Gillingham at the end of the 2018–19 season, but chose instead to sign for National League South side Dulwich Hamlet.

On 24 July 2020 Chapman signed for National League South side Ebbsfleet United. At the end of the 2021/22 season, he was voted the club's Supporters' Player of the Year.
