= National League Cup (football) =

Association football tournament in England

- Founded: 1979 (original); 2024 (revived)
- Region: England
- Teams: 32
- Current champions: Boreham Wood (2025–26)
- Most championships: Leeds United U21; Boreham Wood (1 title)
- 2026–27 National League Cup

The National League Cup is an annual association football competition in England. The National League Cup is open to clubs playing in the National League and, since its revival in 2024, professional under-21 teams playing in the Premier League 2.

== History ==
The competition was formed for the inaugural season of what was then called the Alliance Premier League, in 1979–80 and existed for twenty-two seasons before being axed at the end of the 2000–01 season. It was briefly reformed for the 2004–05 season, in the form of the Conference Challenge Cup, but following a poor response it was again agreed not to renew the competition for the next season.

With the transfer of sponsorship of the Conference to Blue Square for the start of the 2007–08 season two seasons later, the re-introduction of the competition was announced, scheduled to commence that year. On 23 June 2009, the Conference League Cup's sponsor, Setanta's GB division, went into administration and ceased broadcasting.

In the 2024–25 season, the competition was revived as the 32-team National League Cup, with 16 National League clubs and 16 under-21 teams from Premier League 2.

== Format ==
The competition was a knockout tournament with pairings drawn at random – like the FA Cup there is a minimal form of seeding, in that members of the (higher-level) Conference National entered together at a later stage in the tournament, and the draw for each round took place after the completion of the round before.

The revived edition for 2024–25 consists of four groups of four National League and four Premier League 2 teams each, with each National League team playing four home games against the under-21 teams in their group. The top 2 teams from each group advance to the quarter-finals.

== Winners ==
Season	Winner	Runner-up
Bob Lord Challenge Trophy
1979–80	Northwich Victoria	Altrincham
1980–81	Altrincham	Kettering Town
1981–82	Weymouth	Enfield
1982–83	Runcorn	Scarborough
1983–84	Scarborough	Barnet
1984–85	Runcorn	Maidstone United
1985–86	Stafford Rangers	Barnet
1986–87	Kettering Town	Hendon
1987–88	Horwich RMI	Weymouth
1988–89	Barnet	Hyde United
1989–90	Yeovil Town	Kidderminster Harriers
1990–91	Sutton United	Barrow
1991–92	Wycombe Wanderers	Runcorn
1992–93	Northwich Victoria	Wycombe Wanderers
1993–94	Macclesfield Town	Yeovil Town
1994–95	Bromsgrove Rovers	Kettering Town
1995–96	Bromsgrove Rovers	Macclesfield Town
1996–97	Kidderminster Harriers	Macclesfield Town
1997–98	Morecambe	Woking
1998–99	Doncaster Rovers	Farnborough Town
1999–2000	Doncaster Rovers	Kingstonian
2000–01	Chester City	Kingstonian
Conference Cup
2004–05	Woking	Stalybridge Celtic
Setanta Shield
2007–08	Aldershot Town	Rushden & Diamonds
2008–09	AFC Telford United	Forest Green Rovers
National League Cup
2024–25	Leeds United U21	Sutton United
2025–26	Boreham Wood	West Ham United U21

Source: (note: source does not list finals for 1986–87 to 1988–89)
