= Victor Musa =

English footballer (born 2006)

Personal information
- Full name: Victor Osezele Musa Aigbomian
- Birth name: Víctor Musa Aigbomian (Note: In this Spanish name, the first or paternal surname is Musa and the second or maternal family name is Aigbomian.)
- Date of birth: 5 September 2006 (age 20)
- Place of birth: Tudela, Spain
- Position: Forward

Team information
- Current team: Manchester United
- Number: 64

Youth career
- 2014–2017: Lourdes
- 2017–2022: Bradford City
- 2022–: Manchester United

International career^{‡}
Years	Team	Apps	(Gls)
2021	Spain U16	1	(0)
2021	England U16	2	(0)
- ‡ National team caps and goals as of 30 October 2024

Victor Osezele Musa Aigbomian (born 5 September 2006) is a footballer who plays as a forward for Premier League club Manchester United. Born in Spain, he has represented both that nation and England at youth international level, and is also eligible for Nigeria.

== Life and career ==
Musa was born in Tudela in Navarre, Spain. He is of Nigerian descent through his parents and has obtained a Nigerian passport. He moved with his mother to England in 2017, a year after his father moved there for work. He attended St Bede's and St Joseph's Catholic College in Bradford. He mainly operates as a forward. He can also operate as a left-winger. He is left-footed. He is known for his versatility.

As a youth player, he spent time with Lourdes in Spain, then with Bradford City after moving to England. In 2017, he joined the youth academy of Manchester United. In 2023, he was described as "one of the strong men of United's U18s" while playing for the club.

On 5 April 2025, Musa scored six first-half goals and claimed an assist in a 13–1 victory against Leeds United U18s in the U18 Premier League.

== International career ==
Musa made his debut as a substitute for the Spain national under-16 football team on 24 November 2021. He subsequently appeared for the England national under-16 football team the following month.
