= Truro City Stadium =

Football stadium in Truro, England

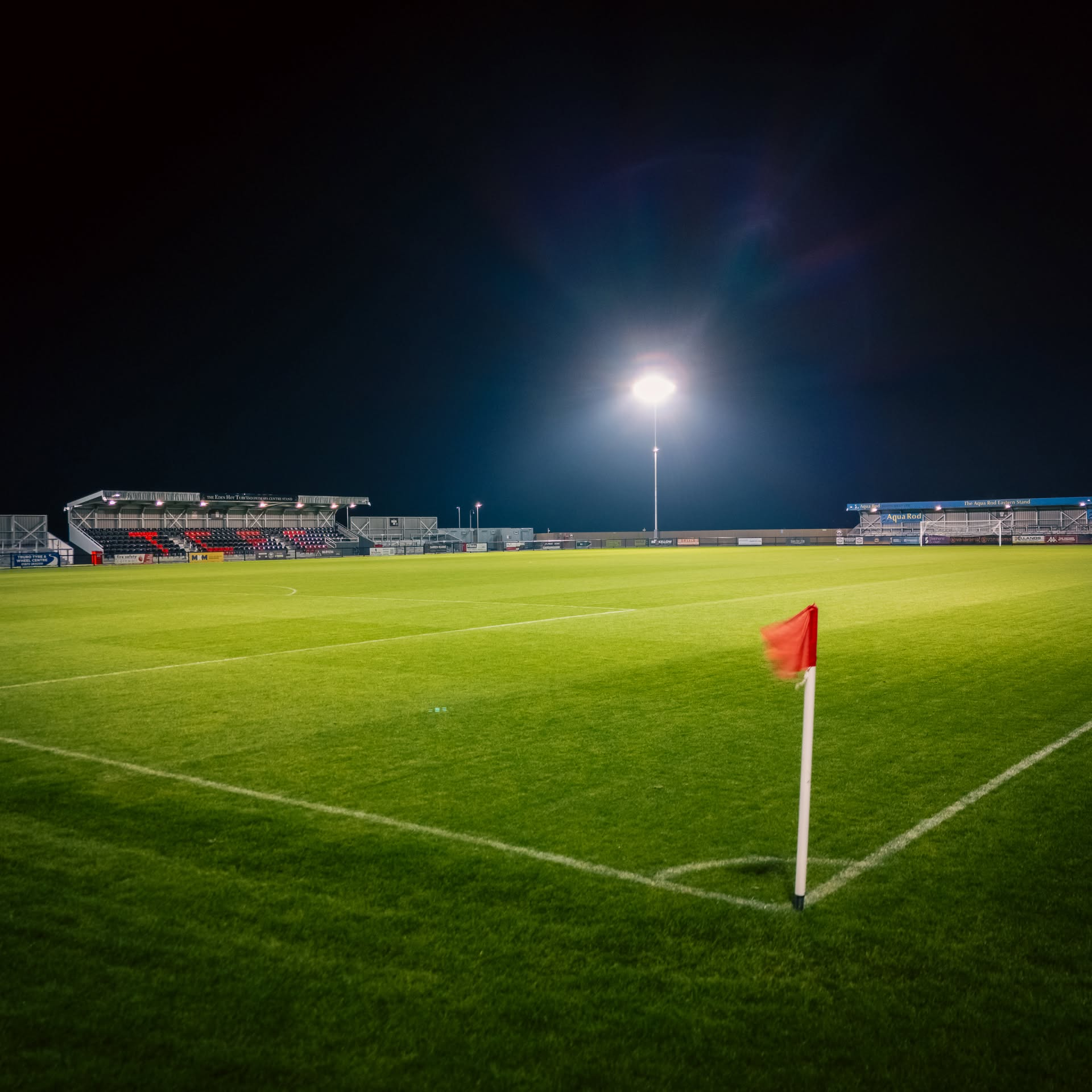
- Interactive map of Truro City Stadium
- Full name: Truro City Stadium
- Address: Truro City Stadium; West Langarth; Threemilestone; Truro; TR4 9AN
- Coordinates: 50°16′04″N 5°07′25″W
- Capacity: 3,597
- Surface: Grass

Construction
- Built: July 2024

Tenant
- Truro City F.C. (2024–present)

Truro City Stadium is a football stadium in Truro, Cornwall, England, and is the home of Truro City F.C. Completed in July 2024, with the first match played on 10 August 2024, it forms part of the development known as Langarth Garden Village.

The capacity of Truro City Stadium is 3,597.

== Stands ==
Truro City Stadium has 3 stands, on the northern, eastern, and western elevations of the pitch, while the southern elevation is open for standing. For sponsorship purposes the northern stand is known as the Eden Hot Tubs & Swim Spa Centre North Stand, and the eastern stand as Aqua Rod Eastern Stand.

== History ==
For most of its history, since 1905, Truro City F.C. played their home fixtures at the Treyew Road Stadium. However, this stadium was closed in 2021, with no replacement, after being sold for development. Truro City were hopeful that plans for the Stadium for Cornwall would provide them a new home ground, but these did not come to fruition.

Having no replacement for their home stadium, Truro City were forced to play their home fixtures between 2021 - 2024 at stadiums in Plymouth and Taunton, a significant distance away.

Alongside plans for Langarth Garden Village, a significant residential development, a new home ground for Truro City was proposed. Following public consultation in 2023, the plans for the new stadium and sport's hub were approved by Cornwall Council, and the construction of the new stadium was completed in-time for the start of the 2024/25 football season.
