= Dan Casey =

Dan Casey may refer to:

- Dan Casey (baseball) (1862–1943), American baseball player
- Dan Casey (footballer) (born 1997), Irish footballer

== See also ==
- Daniel Casey, English actor
- Daniel Casey (screenwriter), American screenwriter
