= Nana Boateng (footballer, born 2002) =

English footballer (born 2002)

Personal information
- Full name: Nana Osei Boateng
- Date of birth: 17 September 2002 (age 24)
- Place of birth: Lambeth, England
- Position: Forward

Team information
- Current team: Hampton & Richmond Borough (on loan from Sutton United)

Youth career
- Millwall

Senior career*
Years	Team	Apps	(Gls)
2022–2024	Millwall	0	(0)
2023–2024	→ Woking (loan)	8	(0)
2024	→ Solihull Moors (loan)	4	(0)
2024–	Sutton United	27	(0)
2025	→ Hemel Hempstead Town (loan)	3	(0)
2026–	→ Hampton & Richmond Borough (loan)	0	(0)
- * Club domestic league appearances and goals as of 14:27, 18 January 2026 (BST)

Nana Osei Boateng (born 17 September 2002) is an English professional footballer who plays as a forward for Hampton & Richmond Borough on loan from National League club Sutton United.

== Career ==
=== Millwall ===
After progressing through Millwall's academy, Boateng's first involvement in a matchday squad for the club was on 29 December 2021 in Millwall's 1–0 win away to Coventry City, where he was an unused substitute. On 8 January 2022, Boateng made his debut for Millwall, coming on as an 81st-minute substitute in a 2–1 FA Cup loss against rivals Crystal Palace.

On 24 July 2023, Boateng joined National League side, Woking on loan until January 2024.

On 28 March 2024, he returned to the National League, to join promotion hopefuls, Solihull Moors on loan for the remainder of the campaign.

In May 2024, Millwall confirmed that Boateng would be departing the club upon the expiration of his contract.

=== Sutton United ===
On 10 June 2024, Boateng agreed to join National League side Sutton United on a two-year deal.

In November 2025, he joined National League South side Hemel Hempstead Town on loan. In January 2026, he joined Hampton & Richmond Borough on loan for the remainder of the season.

On 1 May 2026, Sutton announced it would be releasing the player.

== Career statistics ==
As of match played 22 March 2025

Appearances and goals by club, season and competition
Club	Season	League			FA Cup		EFL Cup		Other		Total	
Club	Season	Division	Apps	Goals	Apps	Goals	Apps	Goals	Apps	Goals	Apps	Goals
Millwall	2021–22	Championship	—		1	0	—		—		1	0
Woking (loan)	2023–24	National League	8	0	—		—		—		8	0
Solihull Moors (loan)	2023–24	National League	4	0	—		—		4 (Note: Two appearances in FA Trophy, two appearances in National League play-offs)	0	8	0
Sutton United	2024–25	National League	20	0	—		—		8 (Note: Three appearances in FA Trophy, five appearances in National League Cup)	4	28	4
Career total			32	0	1	0	—		12	4	45	4

== Honours ==
Solihull Moors

- FA Trophy runner-up: 2023–24
