= Shiloh Remy =

Footballer (born 2000)

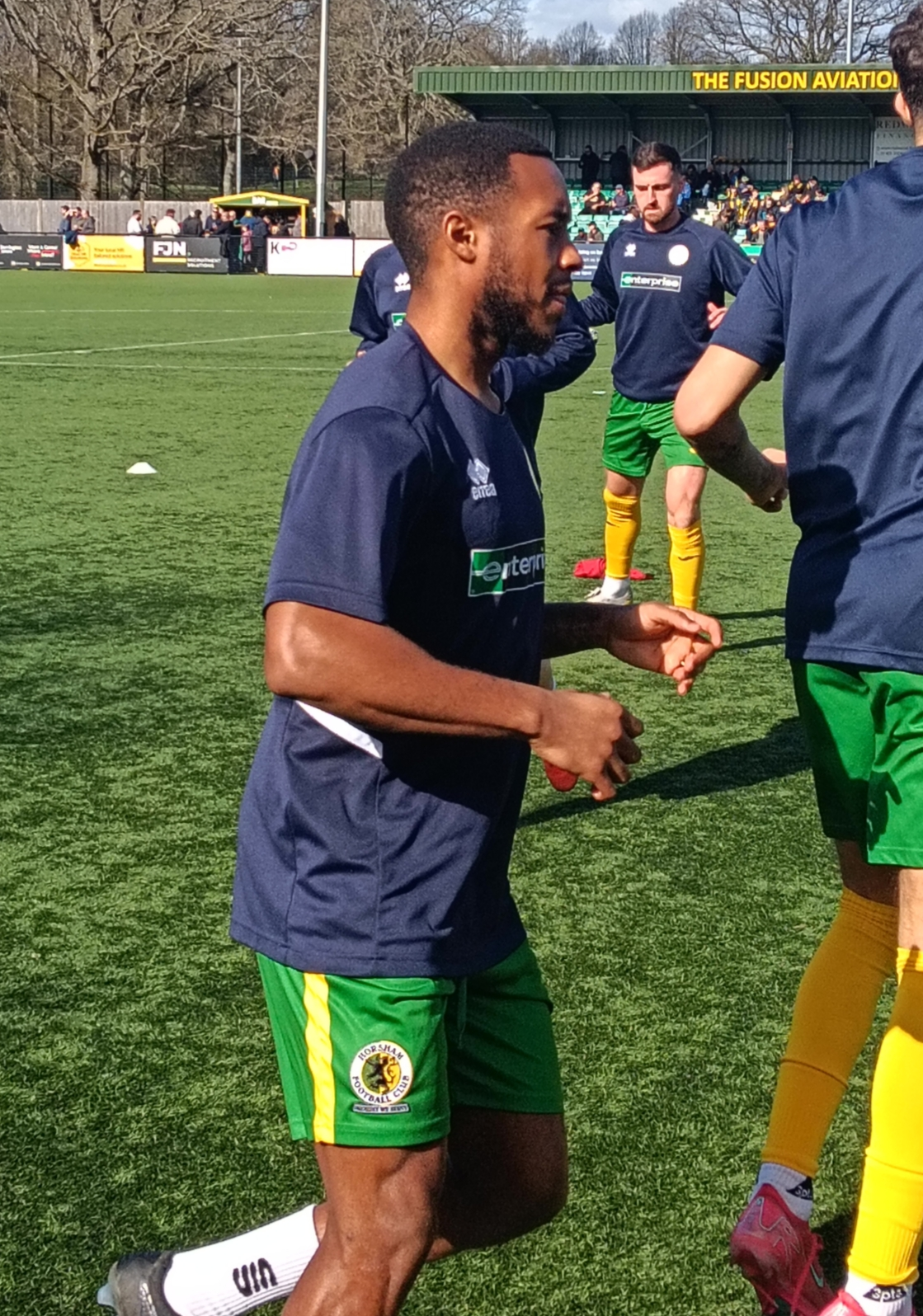
- Shiloh Remy warming up for Horsham

Personal information
- Full name: Shiloh Samuel Remy
- Date of birth: 28 December 2000 (age 25)
- Place of birth: London, England
- Height: 1.70 m (5 ft 7 in)
- Position: Winger

Team information
- Current team: Enfield Town

Youth career
- Tottenham Hotspur
- 2014–2019: Queens Park Rangers

Senior career*
Years	Team	Apps	(Gls)
2019–2022	Queens Park Rangers	0	(0)
2019–2020	→ Stratford Town (loan)	2	(0)
2020	→ Waltham Abbey (loan)	7	(2)
2022–2023	Eastbourne Borough	55	(14)
2023–2025	Dagenham & Redbridge	32	(1)
2025	Chelmsford City	15	(2)
2025–2026	Worthing	11	(0)
2026	→ Horsham (loan)	2	(0)
2026–	Enfield Town	1	(1)

International career^{‡}
2024–	Saint Lucia	2	(0)
- * Club domestic league appearances and goals as of 17:57, 8 August 2026 (UTC) ‡ National team caps and goals as of 15:00, 7 July 2025 (UTC)

Shiloh Samuel Remy (born 28 December 2000) is a professional footballer who plays as a winger for Isthmian League Premier Division club Enfield Town. Born in England, he represents the Saint Lucia national team at international level.

== Club career ==
Shiloh began his career in the academies at Tottenham Hotspur and Queens Park Rangers. On 16 December 2019, Remy was loaned out to Stratford Town. Following his loan at Stratford, Remy was loaned out to Waltham Abbey. Following the culmination of the 2021–22 season, Remy was released by Queens Park Rangers.

On 21 July 2022, following a successful trial, Remy was signed by National League South club Eastbourne Borough.

On 23 December 2023, Remy moved up a division, signing for National League side Dagenham & Redbridge. On 12 June 2025, following Dagenham's relegation to the National League South, Remy was released by the club.

On 30 June 2025, Remy signed for Chelmsford City.

On 23 December 2025, Remy signed for fellow National League South side Worthing.

On 10 March 2026, Remy signed for Horsham on loan until the end of the season.

On 5 August 2026, Remy joined Isthmian League side Enfield Town.

== International career ==
Remy is of Jamaican and Saint Lucian descent.

On 15 November 2024, Remy made his debut for Saint Lucia, starting in a 4–0 defeat against Grenada.

== Career statistics ==
As of 14 March 2026

Appearances and goals by club, season and competition
Club	Season	League			National cup		League cup		Other		Total	
Club	Season	Division	Apps	Goals	Apps	Goals	Apps	Goals	Apps	Goals	Apps	Goals
Queens Park Rangers U23	2020−21	Professional Development League	1	1	—		—		—		1	1
Queens Park Rangers U23	2021−22	Professional Development League	3	2	—		—		—		3	2
Queens Park Rangers U23	Total		4	3	—		—		—		4	3
Eastbourne Borough	2022−23	National League South	44	13	1	1	0	0	1	1	46	15
Eastbourne Borough	2023−24	National League South	11	1	0	0	0	0	—		11	1
Eastbourne Borough	Total		55	14	1	1	—		1	1	57	16
Dagenham & Redbridge	2023−24	National League	9	0	0	0	0	0	—		9	0
Dagenham & Redbridge	2024−25	National League	23	1	2	1	3	1	—		28	3
Dagenham & Redbridge	Total		32	1	2	1	3	1	—		37	3
Chelmsford City	2025−26	National League South	15	2	1	0	0	0	—		16	2
Worthing	2025–26	National League South	11	0	0	0	0	0	—		11	0
Horsham (loan)	2025–26	National League South	2	0	0	0	0	0	—		2	0
Career total			119	20	4	2	3	1	1	1	127	24
