= Cruz Ibeh =

English footballer (born 2003)

Personal information
- Full name: Cruz Jonathan Ibeh
- Date of birth: 16 October 2008 (age 18)
- Place of birth: England
- Height: 6 ft 2 in (1.87 m)
- Position: Midfielder

Team information
- Current team: Middlesbrough
- Number: 44

Youth career
- 2016–2025: Middlesbrough

Senior career*
Years	Team	Apps	(Gls)
2025–	Middlesbrough	1	(0)
- * Club domestic league appearances and goals as of 11 April 2026 (UTC)

Cruz Jonathan Ibeh (born 16 October 2008) is an English professional footballer who plays as a midfielder for EFL Championship club Middlesbrough.

== Club career ==
Ibeh joined the Middlesbrough academy at under-9 level and progressed through the club's youth ranks. On 17 November 2025, he signed his first professional contract with the club. Ibeh made his senior and professional debut on 10 January 2026, coming on as a late substitute in a 3–1 defeat to Fulham in the third round of the FA Cup. He made three senior appearances across all competitions during his debut season.

== Career statistics ==
As of match played 7 August 2026

Appearances and goals by club, season and competition
Club	Season	League			FA Cup		EFL Cup		Other		Total	
Club	Season	Division	Apps	Goals	Apps	Goals	Apps	Goals	Apps	Goals	Apps	Goals
Middlesbrough
Middlesbrough	2025–26	Championship	1	0	1	0	0	0	1 (Note: Appearance in EFL Championship play-offs)	0	3	0
Middlesbrough	2026–27	Championship	0	0	0	0	1	0	0	0	1	0
Middlesbrough	Total		1	0	1	0	1	0	1	0	4	0
Career total			1	0	1	0	1	0	1	0	4	0
