= Boston Community Stadium =

Football stadium in Boston, England

Jakemans Community Stadium
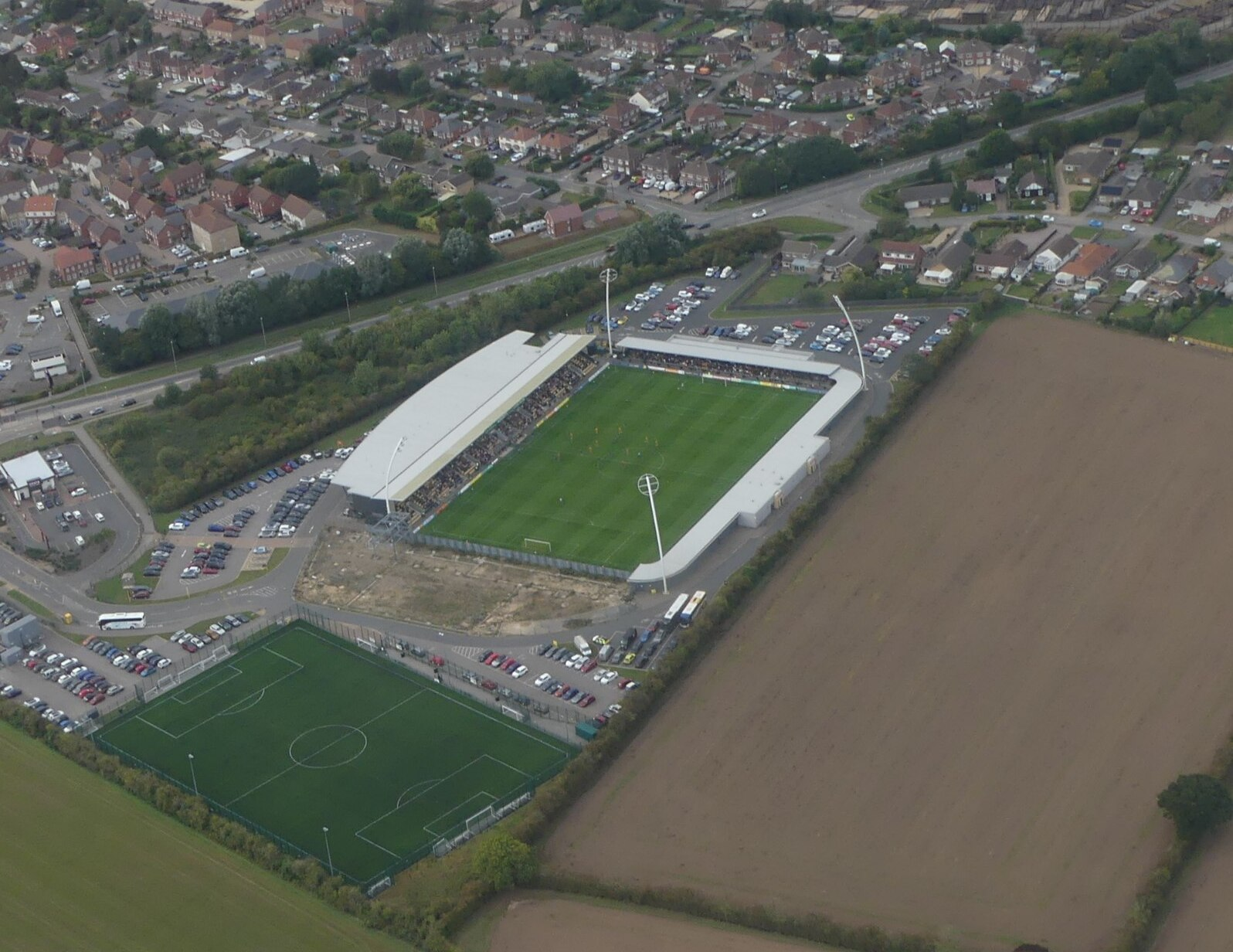
- Aerial view of the stadium in September 2025
- Interactive map of Jakemans Community Stadium
- Address: The Quadrant; Pilgrim Way; Wyberton; PE21 7NE
- Location: Boston, Lincolnshire, England
- Coordinates: 52.9563°N 0.0286°W
- Owner: Boston United F.C.
- Operator: Boston United F.C.
- Capacity: 5,061
- Record attendance: 3,865 (Boston United vs. Wealdstone, 18 April 2025)

Construction
- Opened: 2020
- Cost: £11.5m
- Architect: WMA Architects

Tenant
- Boston United (2020–present)

The Boston Community Stadium, currently known as the Jakemans Community Stadium for sponsorship reasons, is a football stadium in Boston, Lincolnshire, England. It has been the home of National League side Boston United since 2020. The stadium has a capacity of 5,061 spectators.

== History ==
Boston United played at York Street from their inception in 1933. However, on 10 April 2019, the club announced they were to be leaving the ground at the end of the 2019–20 season, with a new stadium set to begin construction on a site in Wyberton. Despite the impacts of the COVID-19 pandemic, the new stadium was completed within two years. For the first few months of the 2020–21 season, Boston groundshared with nearby Gainsborough Trinity at the Northolme.

On 5 December 2020, the Pilgrims played their first fixture at the new stadium. Played behind closed doors due to the pandemic, they were beaten 2–0 by visitors Chorley. The first fixture played at the ground with spectators was Boston's 5–0 friendly win over Lincoln City on 17 July 2021, which saw 1,004 spectators attend.

== Upgrades ==
On 13 March 2025, Pilgrims' vice-chairman Neil Kempster announced that the club was hoping that work on the still unbuilt South Stand would begin later that year, also accompanying a new "sports hub". The stand is expected to house away supporters when complete. Six months later, on 20 September, it was reported that the funding agreement for the project's construction had officially been signed.

There are also currently plans to replace the pitch at the ground, a renovation which is set to cost the club approximately £60,000.

== Records ==
The record attendance set at the stadium is 3,865 spectators, which was recorded on 18 April 2025 when Boston won 2–0 at home to Wealdstone in the National League.

== Attendances ==
As of match played 22 August 2026

Season	League	Position	Average att.	Highest att.	Lowest att.
2020–21	NLN (6)	6th	0 (Note: Because of the COVID-19 pandemic, all matches were held behind closed doors)	0	0
2021–22	NLN (6)	7th	1,652	2,138	1,335
2022–23	NLN (6)	15th	1,547	2,694	890
2023–24	NLN (6)	6th ▲	1,693	2,683	1,170
2024–25	NL (5)	19th	2,126	3,865	1,529
2025–26	NL (5)	12th	1,964	3,198	1,356
2026–27	NL (5)	6th	2,007	2,384	1,630
