= Diogo Monteiro =

Professional footballer (born 2005)

Personal information
- Full name: Diogo Pinheiro Monteiro
- Date of birth: 28 January 2005 (age 21)
- Place of birth: Geneva, Switzerland
- Height: 1.84 m (6 ft 0 in)
- Position: Centre back

Team information
- Current team: Arouca
- Number: 6

Youth career
- 2018–2021: Servette

Senior career*
Years	Team	Apps	(Gls)
2021–2023	Servette	4	(0)
2022	Servette U21	3	(0)
2023–2025	Leeds United	0	(0)
2025–	Arouca	8	(0)

International career^{‡}
2019	Portugal U15	4	(0)
2019–2020	Portugal U16	10	(1)
2021–2022	Portugal U17	17	(3)
2022	Portugal U18	7	(0)
2022–2024	Portugal U19	12	(0)
2025	Portugal U20	1	(1)
- * Club domestic league appearances and goals as of 25 May 2026 ‡ National team caps and goals as of 21 March 2025

Diogo Pinheiro Monteiro (born 28 January 2005) is a professional footballer who plays as a centre-back for Primeira Liga club Arouca. Born in Switzerland, he represents Portugal at youth level.

== Club career ==
On 15 June 2020, Monteiro signed his first professional contract with Servette. He made his professional debut for Servette on 6 March 2021 in the Swiss Super League. At 16 years old, one month and nine days, Monteiro was the third youngest footballer to debut with Swiss Super League, and the youngest defender to do so.

On 31 January 2023, Monteiro joined Premier League side Leeds United for an undisclosed fee, signing a contract until June 2026 with the English club and being initially registered for the under-21 squad.

On 11 August 2025 Monteiro joined Portuguese club Arouca on a permanent contract.

== International career ==
With the national team, Monteiro has more than 30 caps at U15, U16, U17 and U18 level. He has been the captain of the 2005 generation so far and he was a crucial player in the campaign this generation had on the Euro championship in 2022, in Israel. Portugal reached the semi-finals and Monteiro was the only Portuguese player to have played every minute of the tournament.
