= Brandon Powell =

Brandon Powell may refer to:

- Brandon Powell (American football) (born 1995), American gridiron football wide receiver and punt returner
- Brandon Powell (soccer) (born 2005), American association football left-back
