= Yūki Ōhashi =

Japanese footballer

Yūki Ōhashi 大橋 祐紀
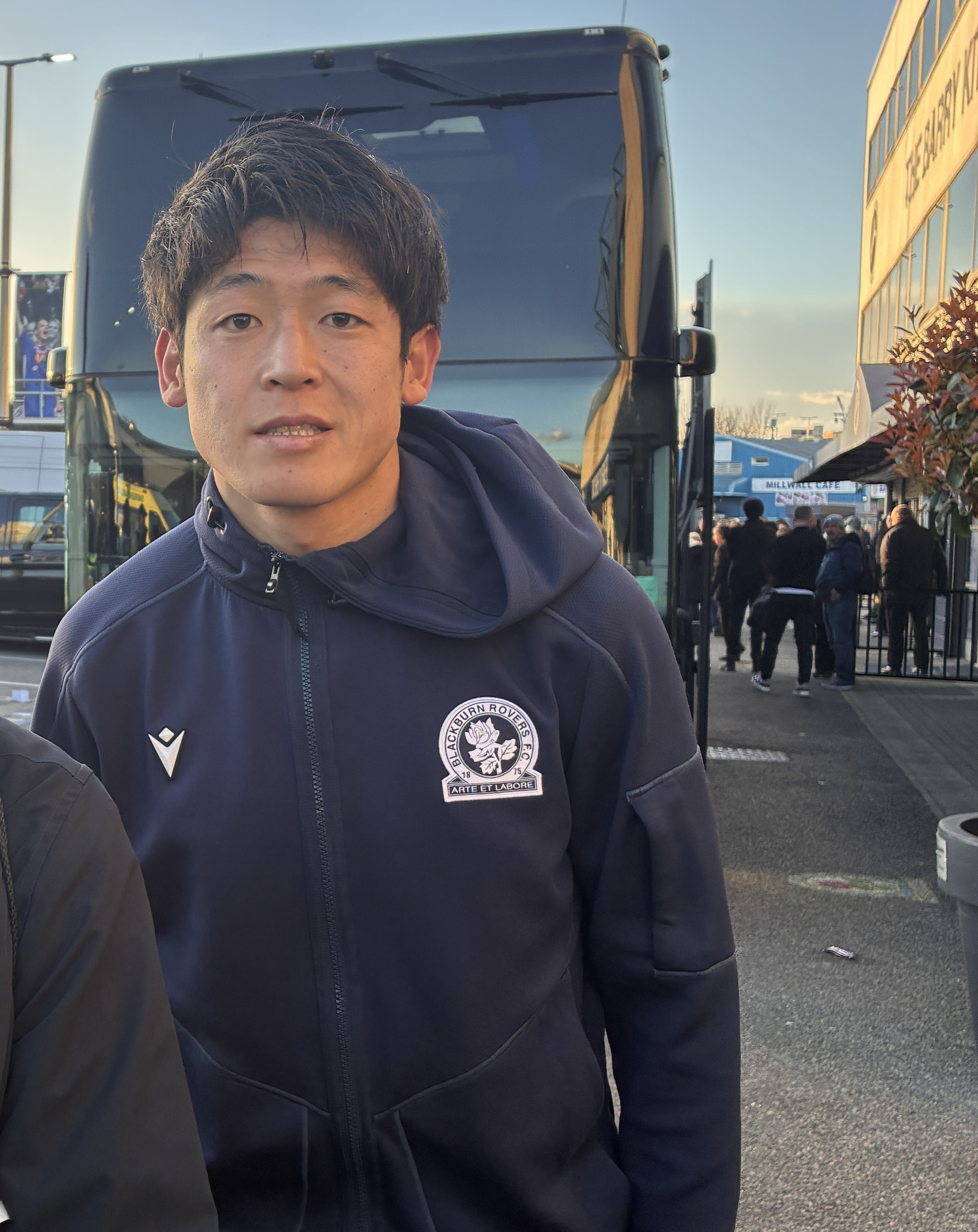
- Ōhashi playing for Blackburn Rovers in 2026

Personal information
- Full name: Yuki Ōhashi
- Date of birth: July 27, 1996 (age 30)
- Place of birth: Matsudo, Chiba, Japan
- Height: 1.81 m (5 ft 11 1/2 in)
- Position: Forward

Team information
- Current team: Blackburn Rovers
- Number: 23

Youth career
- 2003–2005: Tokiwadaira SC
- 2006–2008: Kashiwa Eagles
- 2009–2011: JEF United Chiba
- 2012–2014: Yachiyo High School

College career
Years	Team	Apps	(Gls)
2015–2018	Chuo University		

Senior career*
Years	Team	Apps	(Gls)
2018–2023	Shonan Bellmare	90	(20)
2024	Sanfrecce Hiroshima	22	(11)
2024–	Blackburn Rovers	84	(19)

International career^{‡}
2024–	Japan	2	(0)
- * Club domestic league appearances and goals as of 16:54, 22 August 2026 (UTC) ‡ National team caps and goals as of 23:08, 5 June 2025 (UTC)

Yūki Ōhashi (大橋 祐紀, Ōhashi Yūki; born July 27, 1996) is a Japanese professional footballer who plays as a forward for EFL Championship club Blackburn Rovers and the Japan national team.

== Club career ==
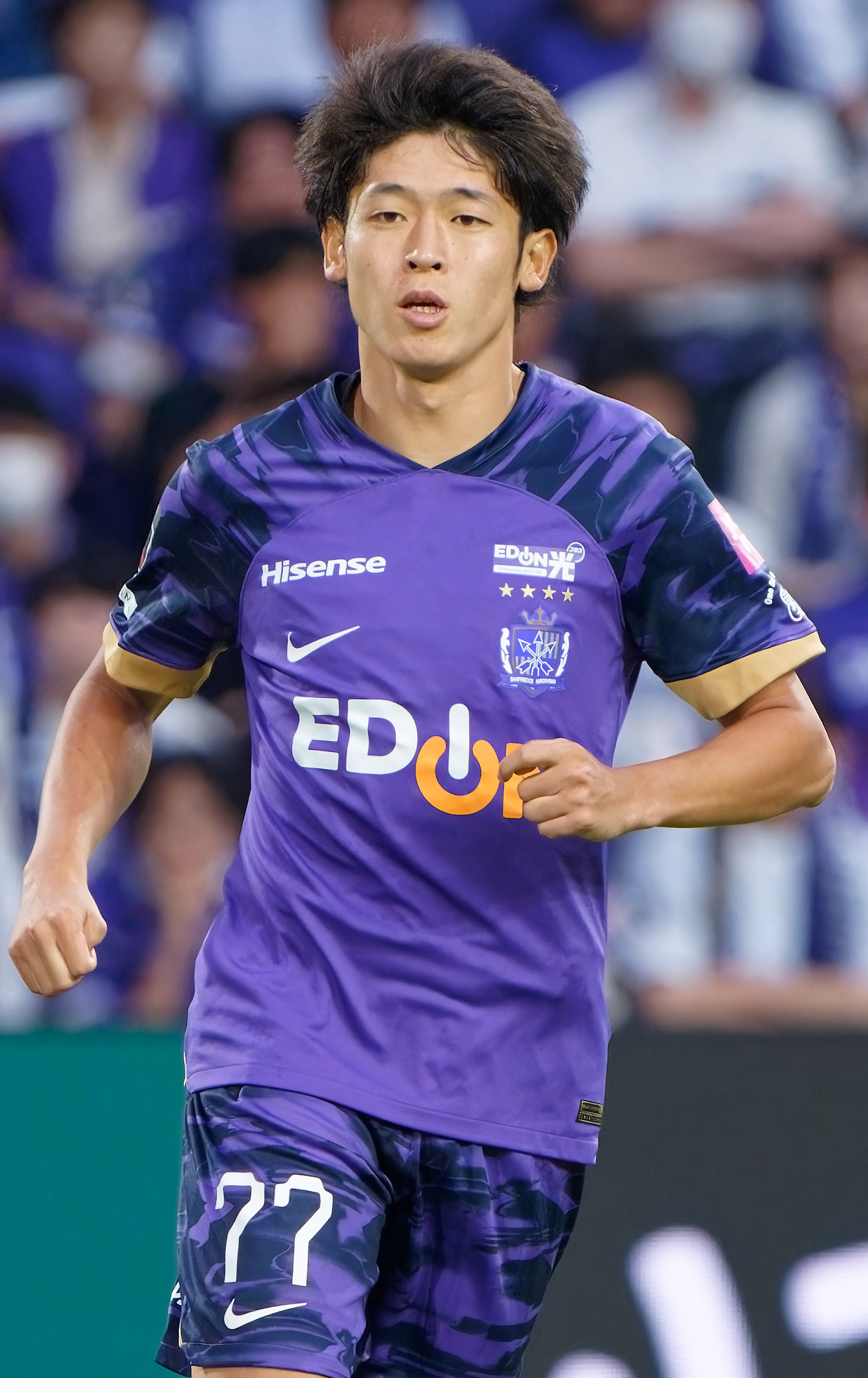
Ōhashi playing for Sanfrecce Hiroshima in 2024.

=== Shonan Bellmare and Sanfrecce Hiroshima ===
He joined J1 League club Shonan Bellmare in 2018. He joined J1 League club Sanfrecce Hiroshima for the 2024 season.

=== Blackburn Rovers ===
On 31 July 2024, Ōhashi moved abroad for the first time, joining Championship side Blackburn Rovers for an undisclosed fee, signing a three-year deal. He scored on his debut in a 4–2 win over Derby County.

On 14 September 2024, Ōhashi scored a brace in a 3–0 home win over Bristol City at Ewood Park. Both goals were later nominated for the club's Goal of the Season award. Ōhashi finished the 2024–25 season as Blackburn's top goalscorer, scoring 10 goals in his first season in England.

Ōhashi scored his first goal of the 2025–26 season in a 3–0 win over Hull City on 7 September 2025, a week later on 14 September 2025, he provided an assist for Japanese international teammate Ryōya Morishita in a 1–0 win over Watford, marking the first time two Japanese players had combined for a goal in the English divisions.

On 20 February 2026, Ōhashi scored his first goal of the calendar year in a 1–0 win over local rivals Preston North End, netting in the fifth minute of added time. In the following match on 24 February, he scored again in a 2–1 defeat to Bristol City. On April 22, Ohashi scored a brace in a 3–1 over Sheffield United, securing Rovers safety in the Championship for the 2026–27 season.

== International career ==
Ōhashi made his Japan national team debut on 15 November 2024 in a World Cup qualifier against Indonesia at the Gelora Bung Karno Stadium. He came on for Kōki Ogawa in the 80th minute as Japan won 4–0.

== Career statistics ==
=== Club ===
As of match played 25 August 2026

Appearances and goals by club, season and competition
Club	Season	League			National cup (Note: Includes Emperor's Cup)		League cup (Note: Includes J.League Cup, EFL Cup)		Continental		Other		Total	
Club	Season	Division	Apps	Goals	Apps	Goals	Apps	Goals	Apps	Goals	Apps	Goals	Apps	Goals
Shonan Bellmare	2018	J1 League	1	0	0	0	0	0	0	0	0	0	1	0
Shonan Bellmare	2019	J1 League	5	1	0	0	4	0	0	0	0	0	9	1
Shonan Bellmare	2020	J1 League	7	0	0	0	2	0	—		—		9	0
Shonan Bellmare	2021	J1 League	31	4	2	0	3	0	—		—		36	4
Shonan Bellmare	2022	J1 League	23	2	1	0	7	1	0	0	—		31	3
Shonan Bellmare	2023	J1 League	23	13	2	1	1	2	0	0	—		26	16
Shonan Bellmare	Total		90	20	5	1	17	3	0	0	0	0	112	24
Sanfrecce Hiroshima	2024	J1 League	22	11	1	1	4	4	0	0	—		27	16
Blackburn Rovers	2024–25	Championship	36	9	0	0	2	1	—		—		38	10
Blackburn Rovers	2025–26	Championship	46	10	1	0	1	0	—		—		48	10
Blackburn Rovers	2026–27	Championship	2	0	0	0	2	0	—		—		4	0
Blackburn Rovers	Total		84	19	1	0	5	1	—		—		90	20
Career total			196	50	7	2	25	8	0	0	0	0	229	60

=== International ===
As of match played 5 June 2025

Appearances and goals by national team and year
National team	Year	Apps	Goals
Japan	2024	1	0
Japan	2025	1	0
Total		2	0
