= Axel Henriksson =

Swedish footballer (born 1998)

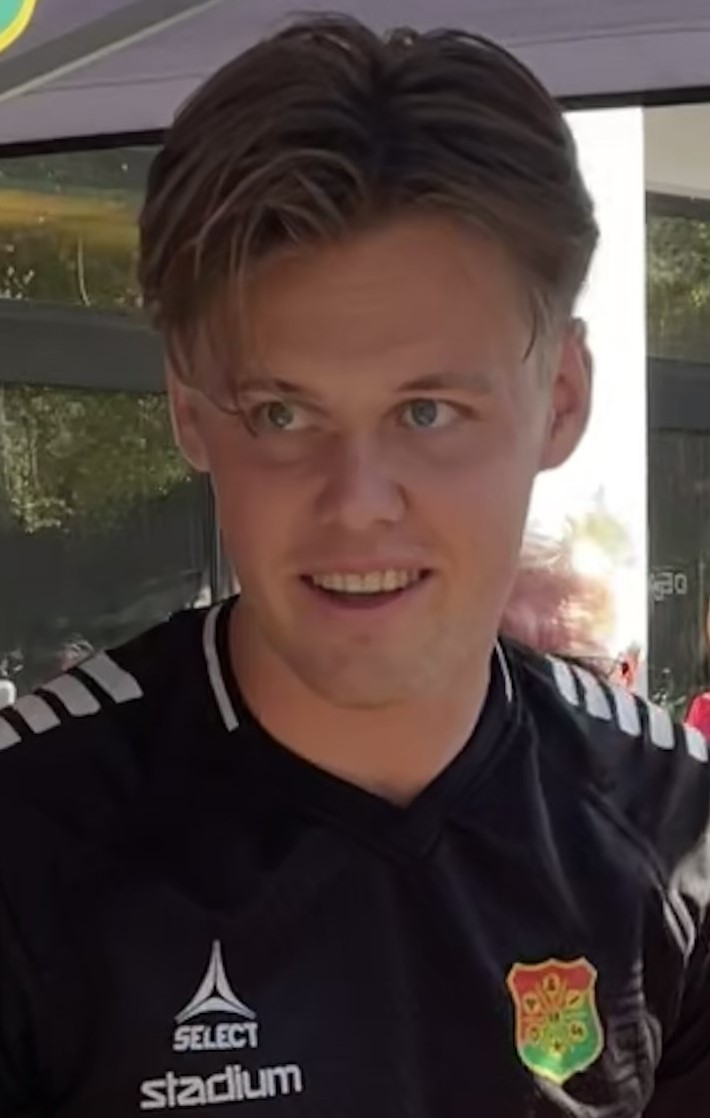
- Henriksson in 2024

Personal information
- Full name: Per Axel Nils Henriksson
- Date of birth: 16 April 2002 (age 24)
- Place of birth: Sweden
- Height: 1.89 m (6 ft 2 in)
- Position: Central midfielder

Team information
- Current team: Randers (on loan from Blackburn Rovers)

Youth career
- IK Zenith
- –2021: BK Häcken

Senior career*
Years	Team	Apps	(Gls)
2021	BK Häcken	0	(0)
2022–2025	GAIS	75	(26)
2025–	Blackburn Rovers	18	(0)
2026–	→ Randers (loan)	1	(0)
- * Club domestic league appearances and goals as of 30 August 2026

Per Axel Nils Henriksson (born 16 April 2002) is a Swedish professional footballer who plays as a central midfielder for Danish Superliga club Randers FC on loan from EFL Championship club Blackburn Rovers.

== Career ==
Henriksson hails from Björlanda, and started his youth career in IK Zenith before joining BK Häcken's academy. He also participated in athletics as a child.

For Häcken's senior team, he featured in three pre-season matches in 2021. He made his debut for Häcken in March 2021, in the 2020–21 Svenska Cupen semi-final against Västerås. He then missed the rest of the 2021 season through knee injury. He was not offered a contract in Häcken and instead signed for GAIS in the Ettan, immediately becoming a starting player.

Henriksson scored 11 goals in 2022 to help secured promotion to the Superettan for GAIS. In 2023, GAIS secured its second straight promotion, with Henriksson described as a "crowd favourite".

Henriksson made his Allsvenskan debut in March 2024 against Brommapojkarna. He scored his first double goal in Allsvenskan against Elfsborg in May 2024. He was described as a "key player" for GAIS.

At the same time, he became somewhat controversial. After scoring in the GAIS–IFK Göteborg derby in May 2024, Henriksson was heard singing "Pissa, pissa på, pissa på IFK" after the match. In October 2024, he apologized after praising the use of bangers in the stands.

On 6 August 2025, Henriksson signed for Blackburn Rovers on a four-year deal with an option to extend for a further season.

On 28 August 2026, Henriksson signed for Danish Superliga club Randers on loan until the end of the season with the option to make the move permanent. On 30 August 2026, two days later, Henriksson made his debut, coming on as a substitute for Martin Sjølstad. He received a red card following a VAR review within 10 minutes of coming on in a 2–1 win over AGF. His following match after his suspension came on 16 September in the Danish Cup where he scored a brace against Vendsyssel FF.

== Personal life ==
In February 2022, he was diagnosed with Crohn's disease.

== Career statistics ==
As of match played 16 September 2026

Appearances and goals by club, season and competition
Club	Season	League			National cup (Note: Includes appearance(s) in the Svenska Cupen, FA Cup, and Danish Cup)		League Cup (Note: Includes appearance(s) in the EFL Cup)		Other		Total	
Club	Season	Division	Apps	Goals	Apps	Goals	Apps	Goals	Apps	Goals	Apps	Goals
BK Häcken	2021	Allsvenskan	0	0	1	0	—		—		1	0
GAIS	2022	Ettan Fotboll	20	11	1	0	—		—		21	11
GAIS	2023	Superettan	17	6	1	0	—		—		18	6
GAIS	2024	Allsvenskan	26	8	1	0	—		—		27	8
GAIS	2025	Allsvenskan	12	1	2	0	—		—		14	1
GAIS	Total		75	26	5	0	—		—		80	26
Blackburn Rovers	2025–26	Championship	18	0	1	0	1	0	—		20	0
Randers (loan)	2026–27	Danish Superliga	1	0	1	2	0	0	0	0	2	2
Career total			94	26	8	2	1	0	0	0	103	28
