= Ryōya Morishita =

Japanese footballer

Ryōya Morishita 森下 龍矢
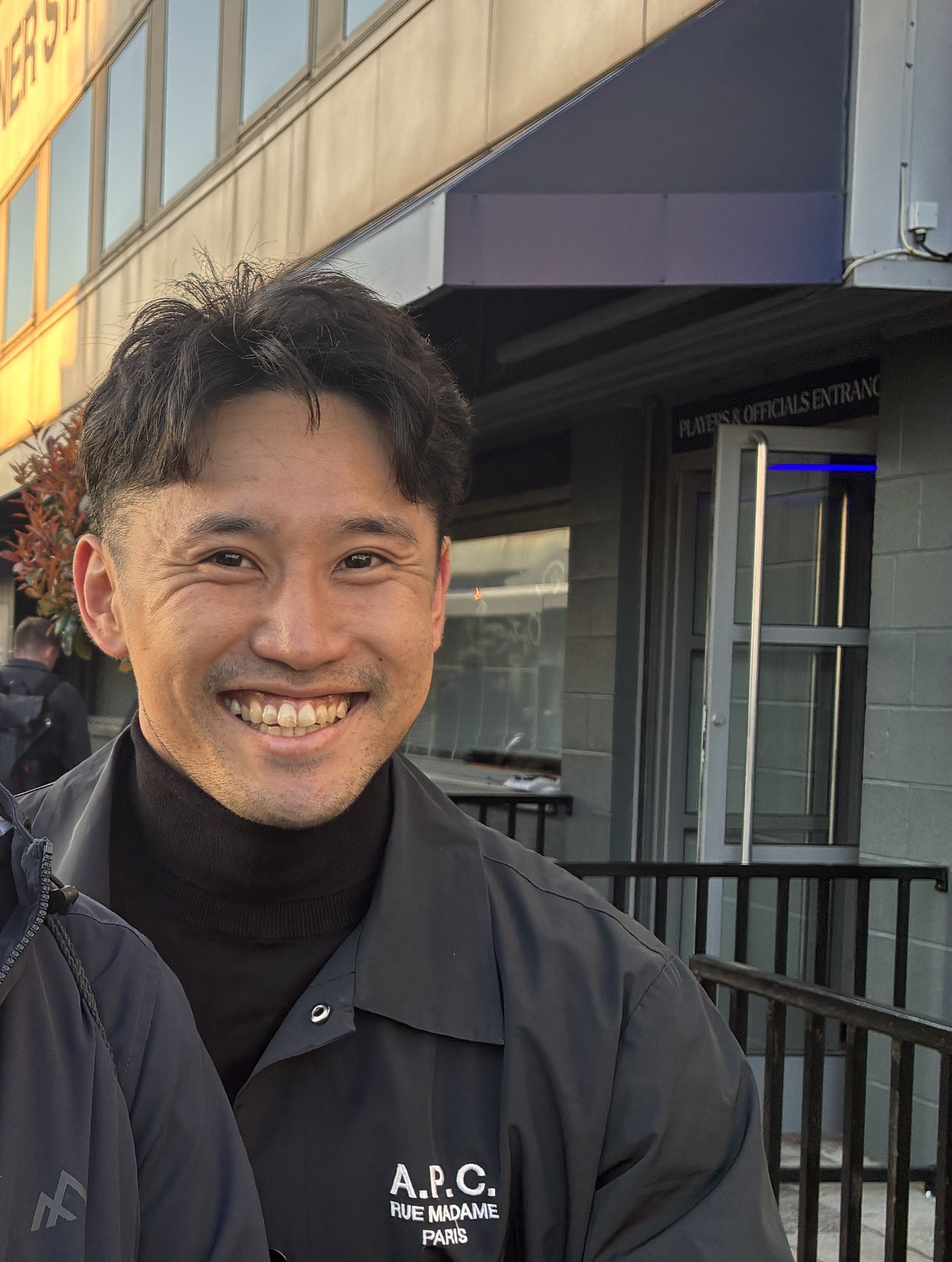
- Morishita in 2026

Personal information
- Full name: Ryōya Morishita
- Date of birth: 11 April 1997 (age 29)
- Place of birth: Shizuoka, Japan
- Height: 1.68 m (5 ft 6 in)
- Positions: Midfielder; winger

Team information
- Current team: Blackburn Rovers
- Number: 25

Youth career
- 2004–2009: Kakegawa JFC 01
- 2010–2015: Júbilo Iwata

College career
| Years | Team | Apps | (Gls) |
| 2016–2019 | Meiji University | | |

Senior career*
| Years | Team | Apps | (Gls) |
| 2020 | Sagan Tosu | 33 | (3) |
| 2021–2024 | Nagoya Grampus | 87 | (5) |
| 2024 | → Legia Warsaw (loan) | 30 | (4) |
| 2024–2025 | Legia Warsaw | 18 | (3) |
| 2025– | Blackburn Rovers | 48 | (6) |

International career^{‡}
| 2023– | Japan | 3 | (1) |
- * Club domestic league appearances and goals as of 17:23, 17 October 2026 (UTC) ‡ National team caps and goals as of 10 June 2025

Ryōya Morishita (森下 龍矢, Morishita Ryōya; born 11 April 1997) is a Japanese professional footballer who plays as a midfielder or winger for EFL Championship club Blackburn Rovers and the Japan national team.

== Club career ==
=== Sagan Tosu ===
On 3 August 2019, Morishita was promoted to the Sagan Tosu first team from the 2020 season. He made his league debut for the club on 22 February 2020 against Kawasaki Frontale. Morishita scored his first league goal against FC Tokyo on 1 August 2020.

=== Nagoya Grampus ===
On 29 December 2020, Morishita was announced at Nagoya Grampus. During his time at Nagoya Grampus, he was played as a wing-back.

=== Legia Warsaw ===
Morishita moved to Legia Warsaw on 9 January 2024 on loan. He was the first Japanese player in Legia's history, and the fourteenth in the Polish Ekstraklasa. On 9 February 2024, he made his debut with the club, in an away 1–0 victory over Ruch Chorzów at Stadion Śląski. On 8 August 2024, he scored his first goal for Legia during the third elimination round for the UEFA Conference League in a 2–3 away victory over Brøndby IF. Morishita scored his first goal in Ekstraklasa three days later, in a 2–2 draw against Puszcza Niepołomice.

On 17 December 2024, Morishita signed a contract until the end of 2028–29 season after Legia exercised his release clause. Morishita scored two goals and provided an assist in the Polish Cup quarterfinal against Jagiellonia Białystok. On 2 May 2025, in the final of the competition, he scored a goal and provided two assists against Pogoń Szczecin. Legia won the match 4–3, securing the club's 21st Polish Cup trophy. Morishita was named the Player of the Match.

=== Blackburn Rovers ===
On 25 August 2025, Morishita joined English club Blackburn Rovers on a three-year deal for an undisclosed fee. He made his debut as a substitute in a 2–0 home defeat to Norwich City. He made his full debut starting against Watford on 13 September where he scored a 47th minute winner in a 1–0 away win.

Morishita scored four goals and registered nine assists in 37 Championship appearances during the season. In a 3–1 win over Queens Park Rangers, he assisted Mathias Jørgensen for the opening goal before scoring his first header in senior football. He played a key role in Rovers securing their EFL Championship status in a 3–1 win over Sheffield United, assisting fellow Japanese forward Yūki Ōhashi for the opener before scoring from the rebound after Ryan Alebiosu's initial effort. Morishita was later named 2025–26 player of the season with 38% of the vote.

== International career ==
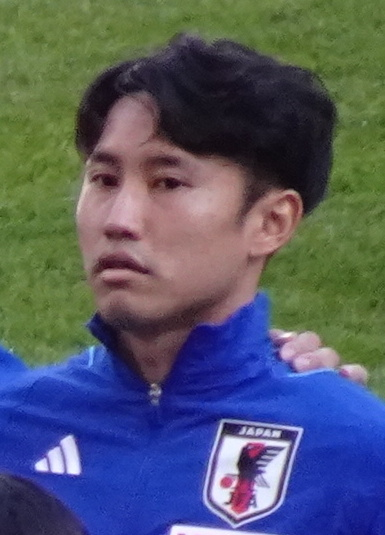
Morishita in 2024 with Japan.

Morishita scored his first international goal against Indonesia on 10 June 2025, scoring in the 55th minute.

== Career statistics ==
=== Club ===
As of match played 17 October 2026

Appearances and goals by club, season and competition
| Club | Season | League | | | National cup (Note: Includes Emperor's Cup, Polish Cup, FA Cup) | | League cup (Note: Includes J.League Cup, EFL Cup) | | Continental | | Other | | Total | |
| Club | Season | Division | Apps | Goals | Apps | Goals | Apps | Goals | Apps | Goals | Apps | Goals | Apps | Goals |
|---|---|---|---|---|---|---|---|---|---|---|---|---|---|---|
| Meiji University | 2019 | — | | | 1 | 1 | 0 | 0 | — | | — | | 1 | 1 |
| Sagan Tosu | 2020 | J1 League | 33 | 3 | — | | 1 | 0 | — | | — | | 34 | 3 |
| Nagoya Grampus | 2021 | J1 League | 22 | 0 | 4 | 0 | 5 | 0 | 7 (Note: Appearances in AFC Champions League) | 0 | — | | 38 | 0 |
| Nagoya Grampus | 2022 | J1 League | 32 | 1 | 2 | 0 | 8 | 1 | — | | — | | 42 | 2 |
| Nagoya Grampus | 2023 | J1 League | 33 | 4 | 4 | 0 | 5 | 1 | — | | — | | 42 | 5 |
| Nagoya Grampus | Total | | 87 | 5 | 10 | 0 | 18 | 2 | 7 | 0 | 0 | 0 | 122 | 7 |
| Legia Warsaw | 2023–24 | Ekstraklasa | 13 | 0 | — | | — | | 2 (Note: Appearances in UEFA Conference League) | 0 | — | | 15 | 0 |
| Legia Warsaw | 2024–25 | Ekstraklasa | 31 | 6 | 5 | 4 | — | | 15 | 4 | — | | 51 | 14 |
| Legia Warsaw | 2025–26 | Ekstraklasa | 4 | 1 | 0 | 0 | — | | 7 (Note: Six appearances in UEFA Europa League, one appearance in UEFA Conference League) | 0 | 1 (Note: Appearance in Polish Super Cup) | 0 | 12 | 1 |
| Legia Warsaw | Total | | 48 | 7 | 5 | 4 | 0 | 0 | 24 | 4 | 1 | 0 | 78 | 15 |
| Blackburn Rovers | 2025–26 | Championship | 37 | 4 | 0 | 0 | 0 | 0 | — | | — | | 37 | 4 |
| Blackburn Rovers | 2026–27 | Championship | 11 | 2 | 0 | 0 | 2 | 0 | — | | — | | 13 | 2 |
| Blackburn Rovers | Total | | 48 | 6 | 0 | 0 | 2 | 0 | — | | — | | 50 | 6 |
| Career total | | | 216 | 21 | 16 | 5 | 21 | 2 | 31 | 4 | 1 | 0 | 285 | 32 |

=== International ===
As of match played 10 June 2025

Appearances and goals by national team and year
| National team | Year | Apps | Goals |
|---|---|---|---|
Japan
| Japan | 2023 | 1 | 0 |
| Japan | 2024 | 1 | 0 |
| Japan | 2025 | 1 | 1 |
| Total | | 3 | 1 |

Scores and results list Japan's goal tally first, score column indicates score after each Morishita goal.

List of international goals scored by Ryōya Morishita
| No. | Date | Venue | Opponent | Score | Result | Competition |
|---|---|---|---|---|---|---|
| 1 | 10 June 2025 | Suita City Football Stadium, Suita, Japan | Indonesia | 4–0 | 6–0 | 2026 FIFA World Cup qualification |

== Honours ==
Nagoya Grampus

- J.League Cup: 2021

Legia Warsaw

- Polish Cup: 2024–25
- Polish Super Cup: 2025

Individual

- Polish Cup top scorer: 2024–25
