= Fiyinfoluwa =

Fiyinfoluwa (Yoruba: Fìyìnfólúwa, pronounced [fìjĩ̀fólúwā]) is a Yoruba unisex given name of Nigerian origin. It means 'Give glory to God.'

== Person with the name ==
- Ryan Fiyinfoluwa Alebiosu, Nigerian professional footballer
