= Igor Tyjon =

English footballer (born 2008)

Personal information
- Full name: Igor Julian Tyjon
- Date of birth: 20 March 2008 (age 18)
- Place of birth: Southport, England
- Height: 1.67 m (5 ft 6 in)
- Position: Forward

Team information
- Current team: Arsenal
- Number: 64

Youth career
- –2023: Rochdale
- 2023–2026: Blackburn Rovers
- 2026–: Arsenal

Senior career*
Years	Team	Apps	(Gls)
2024–2026	Blackburn Rovers	2	(0)
2026–	Arsenal	0	(0)

International career^{‡}
2024	England U16	3	(2)
2024	Poland U16	3	(2)
2024–2025	England U17	12	(2)
2025–	England U18	5	(3)
- * Club domestic league appearances and goals as of 23:01, 21 April 2025 (UTC) ‡ National team caps and goals as of 01:43, 19 November 2025 (UTC)

Igor Julian Tyjon (born 20 March 2008) is an English-Polish professional footballer who plays as a forward for Premier League club Arsenal. He is an England youth international.

== Early life ==
Tyjon was born in Southport to Marcin and Marcelina Tyjon, both immigrants from Poland. He has a younger brother.

== Club career ==
Tyjon joined Blackburn Rovers from Rochdale in July 2023. He made his debut for the Blackburn U21 side as a fifteen year-old in November 2023. He went on to appear in first-team match day squads during the 2023–24 season for EFL Championship fixtures against Bristol City and Leicester City, though he remained an unused substitute. He signed a scholarship contract with Blackburn in July 2024.

On 27 August 2024, Tyjon was named amongst the match-day substitutes for the Blackburn Rovers first-team for the EFL Cup against Blackpool. He made his professional debut in the EFL Championship on 14 September 2024, appearing as a second-half substitute in a 3–0 home win over Bristol City.

=== Arsenal ===
On 28 August 2026, Tyjon signed for Premier League club Arsenal.

== International career ==
On 21 February 2024, Tyjon scored two goals on his debut for England U16 in a 3-1 win over Saudi Arabia. In April that year, he represented Poland at under-16 level. In September 2024, Tyjon played for England U17. The following month saw him score in qualifiers against Malta and Latvia.

On 3 September 2025, Tyjon made his England U18 debut during a 3–1 win over Uzbekistan. He scored two goals in their next game against Morocco. The following month saw him score again during a draw with France U18.

On 21 October 2025, Tyjon was included in the England squad for the 2025 FIFA U-17 World Cup. He featured as a substitute in all of their group games against Venezuela, Haiti and Egypt. Tyjon also came off the bench during their round of sixteen defeat by Austria.

== Career statistics ==
As of match played 12 August 2025

Appearances and goals by club, season and competition
Club	Season	League			FA Cup		EFL Cup		Other		Total	
Club	Season	Division	Apps	Goals	Apps	Goals	Apps	Goals	Apps	Goals	Apps	Goals
Blackburn Rovers	2024–25	Championship	2	0	0	0	0	0	—		2	0
Blackburn Rovers	2025–26	Championship	0	0	0	0	1	0	—		1	0
Career total			2	0	0	0	1	0	0	0	3	0
