= Todd Cantwell =

English footballer (born 1998)

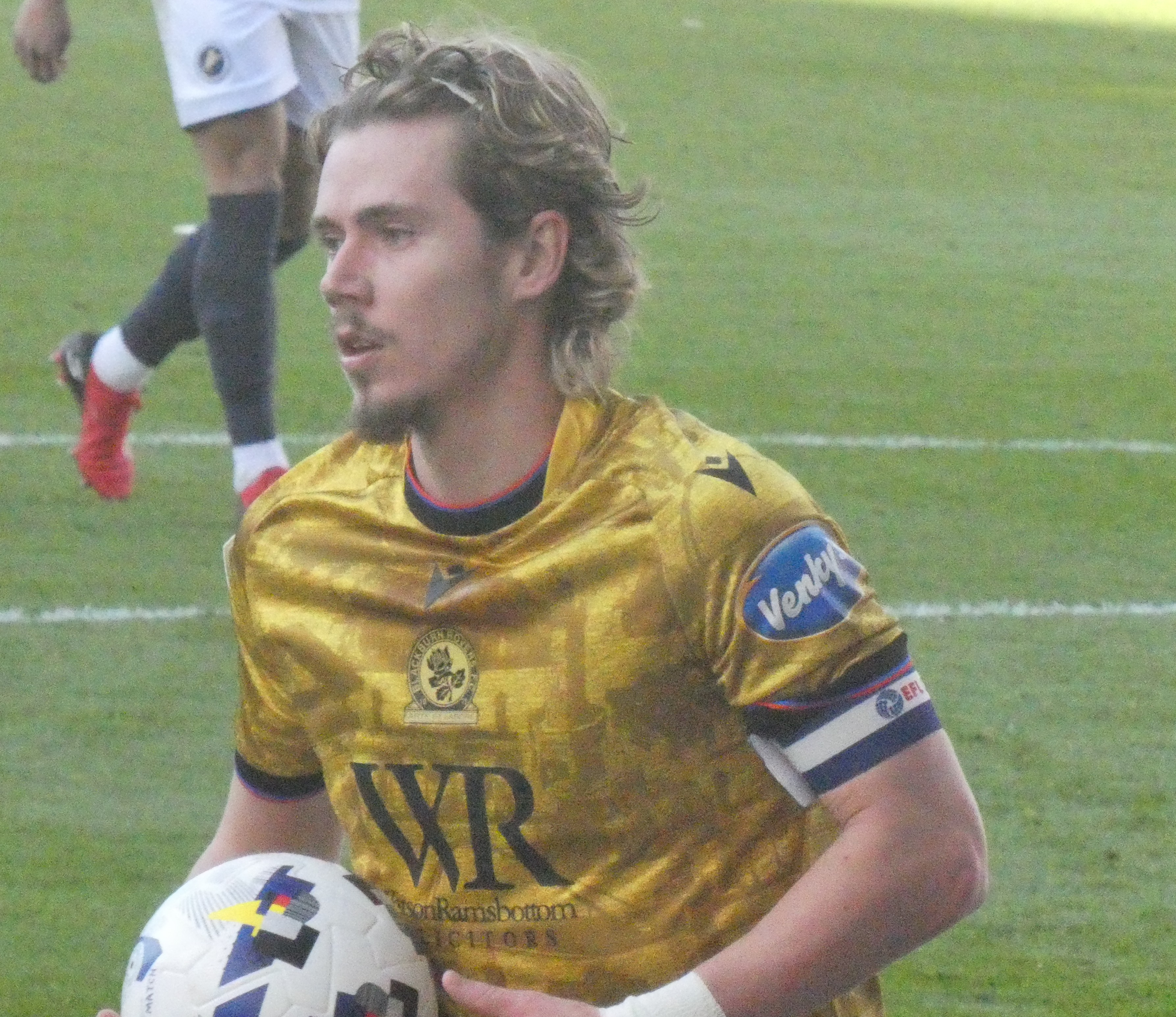
- Cantwell with Blackburn Rovers in 2026

Personal information
- Full name: Todd Owen Cantwell
- Date of birth: 27 February 1998 (age 28)
- Place of birth: Dereham, England
- Height: 5 ft 10 in (1.77 m)
- Position: Attacking midfielder

Team information
- Current team: Blackburn Rovers
- Number: 10

Youth career
- 2008–2017: Norwich City

Senior career*
Years	Team	Apps	(Gls)
2017–2023	Norwich City	120	(13)
2018	→ Fortuna Sittard (loan)	10	(2)
2022	→ AFC Bournemouth (loan)	11	(0)
2023–2024	Rangers	47	(13)
2024–	Blackburn Rovers	77	(10)

International career
2014	England U17	4	(1)
2019–2021	England U21	4	(0)
- * Club domestic league appearances and goals as of 16:06, 24 October 2026 (UTC)

Todd Owen Cantwell (born 27 February 1998) is an English professional footballer who plays as an attacking midfielder for and captains EFL Championship club Blackburn Rovers.

Cantwell began his career at Norwich City, joining the club at under-10 level in 2008 and making his first-team debut in January 2018. He made 129 appearances for Norwich over six seasons and had loan spells at Fortuna Sittard and AFC Bournemouth. He joined Scottish side Rangers in January 2023, before returning to England in August 2024 when he signed for Blackburn Rovers.

Cantwell played youth international football for England at under-17 and under-21 levels.

== Club career ==
=== Norwich City ===
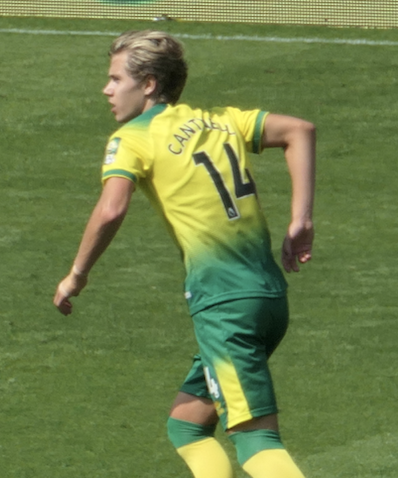
Cantwell playing for Norwich City in 2019.

Cantwell was born in Dereham, Norfolk, and attended Northgate High School. He joined the Norwich City Academy at under-10 level in 2008. He was shortlisted for the Premier League 2 player of the season award for the 2016–17 season. In October 2017, he was named as a substitute for two Norwich City matches, but did not make an appearance. He made his senior debut in January 2018, in an FA Cup match against Chelsea at Stamford Bridge. In the same month, he was loaned to Dutch club Fortuna Sittard for the rest of the season.

Cantwell made his first start for Norwich City in the team's first round EFL Cup match against Stevenage on 14 August 2018. He made his Norwich City league debut in September 2018 against Reading. In December 2018, he scored his first senior goal in a 3–1 victory over Rotherham United. He had his contract extended by Norwich at the end of the 2018–19 season, after the club exercised a one-year option. On 17 August 2019, he assisted two Teemu Pukki goals, as Norwich defeated Newcastle United 3–1.

On 31 January 2022, Cantwell joined AFC Bournemouth on loan until the end of the season. Bournemouth chose not to buy him at the end of his loan deal, and so he returned to Norwich. He signed a one-year contract extension with Norwich for the 2022–23 season.

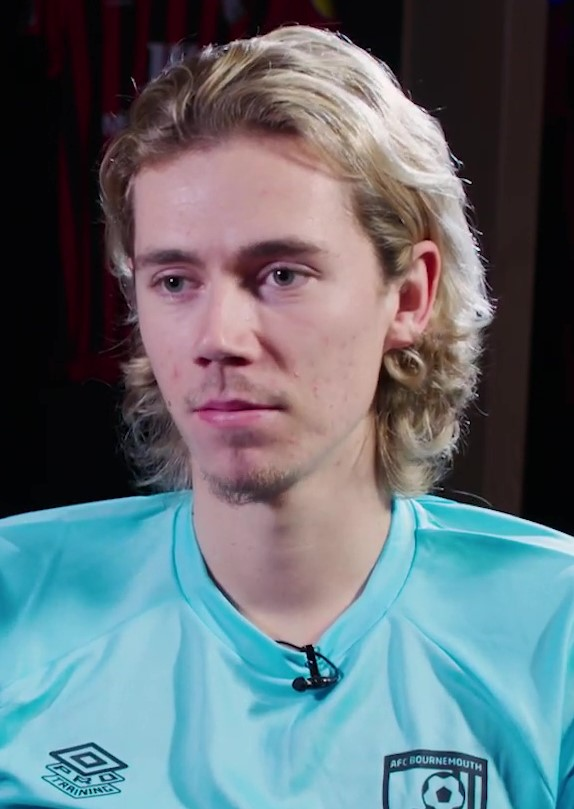
Cantwell with AFC Bournemouth in 2022.

=== Rangers ===
On 23 January 2023, Cantwell joined Scottish Premiership club Rangers for an undisclosed fee. He scored his first goal for the club on 18 March 2023 in a 4–2 win against Motherwell. Cantwell scored the first goal of the game in a 3–0 victory over Celtic at Ibrox on 13 May 2023, rifling home a shot on the rebound after Joe Hart parried John Lundstram's initial long range effort.

In his second season at Rangers, Cantwell continued to be a key player in midfield and in supporting the attack. On 24 January 2024, he scored the second goal of the game in a 3–0 away victory for Rangers against Hibernian. On 3 February 2024, Cantwell scored the third goal of the game in a 3–0 victory over Livingston at Ibrox.

=== Blackburn Rovers ===
On 30 August 2024, Blackburn Rovers announced the signing of Cantwell on a three-year deal for an undisclosed fee. He scored his first goal for the club—a penalty—in a 1–0 home win over Leeds on 30 November 2024.

On 20 September 2025, Cantwell scored a 60th-minute penalty against Ipswich Town to give his side a 1–0 lead. The match was later abandoned in the 79th minute by the referee due to a waterlogged pitch after torrential rain during the game. Therefore, his goal was voided in the replay match on 3 December 2025, which ended 1–1 with goals from his teammate Andri Guðjohnsen and the opposing player Sindre Walle Egeli.

== International career ==
Cantwell represented the England under-17 team at the 2014 Nordic tournament, making his debut against Iceland and scoring in a draw against Finland. He scored one goal in four appearances in total at under-17 level.

On 30 August 2019, Cantwell was included in the England under-21 squad for the first time and made his debut as a 61st-minute substitute for Morgan Gibbs-White during the 2021 U21 EURO 2–0 qualifying win over Kosovo at Hull City on 9 September 2019. In March 2021, he was included in the England squad for the group stage matches of the 2021 UEFA European Under-21 Championship. He was a late call-up to replace Mason Greenwood, who was ruled out by injury. Cantwell made four appearances in total for the under-21 team.

== Career statistics ==
As of match played 24 October 2026

Appearances and goals by club, season and competition
Club	Season	League			National cup (Note: Includes FA Cup and Scottish Cup)		League cup (Note: Includes EFL Cup and Scottish League Cup)		Europe		Other		Total	
Club	Season	Division	Apps	Goals	Apps	Goals	Apps	Goals	Apps	Goals	Apps	Goals	Apps	Goals
Norwich City U21	2016–17	—	—		—		—		—		2 (Note: Appearances in EFL Trophy)	0	2	0
Norwich City	2017–18	Championship	0	0	1	0	0	0	—		—		1	0
Norwich City	2018–19	Championship	24	1	1	0	2	0	—		—		27	1
Norwich City	2019–20	Premier League	37	6	3	1	0	0	—		—		40	7
Norwich City	2020–21	Championship	33	6	1	0	0	0	—		—		34	6
Norwich City	2021–22	Premier League	8	0	—		0	0	—		—		8	0
Norwich City	2022–23	Championship	18	0	0	0	1	0	—		—		19	0
Norwich City	Total		120	13	6	1	3	0	—		—		129	14
Fortuna Sittard (loan)	2017–18	Eerste Divisie	10	2	—		—		—		—		10	2
AFC Bournemouth (loan)	2021–22	Championship	11	0	1	0	—		—		—		12	0
Rangers	2022–23	Scottish Premiership	16	6	3	0	1	0	—		—		20	6
Rangers	2023–24	Scottish Premiership	30	7	4	0	2	0	8 (Note: Four appearances in UEFA Champions League, four appearances and one goal in UEFA Europa League)	1	—		44	8
Rangers	Total		46	13	7	0	3	0	8	1	—		64	14
Blackburn Rovers	2024–25	Championship	37	3	2	0	—		—		—		39	3
Blackburn Rovers	2025–26	Championship	28	5	0	0	1	0	—		—		29	5
Blackburn Rovers	2026–27	Championship	12	2	0	0	2	0	—		—		14	2
Blackburn Rovers	Total		77	10	2	0	3	0	—		—		82	10
Career total			264	38	16	1	9	0	8	1	2	0	299	40

== Honours ==
Norwich City

- EFL Championship: 2018–19, 2020–21

Rangers

- Scottish League Cup: 2023–24
