= 2025–26 Blackburn Rovers F.C. season =

English football club season

Blackburn Rovers
2025–26 season
- Owner: Venkys London Ltd.
- Head coach: Valérien Ismaël (until 2 February); Damien Johnson (interim); Michael O'Neill (from 13 February)
- Stadium: Ewood Park
- Championship: 20th
- FA Cup: Third round
- EFL Cup: First round
- Top goalscorer: League: Yūki Ōhashi (10); All: Yūki Ōhashi (10)
| Home colours | Third colours |

The 2025–26 season was the 138th season in the history of Blackburn Rovers Football Club and their eighth consecutive season in the Championship. In addition to the domestic league, the club participated in the FA Cup and the EFL Cup.

== Season summary ==
=== May ===
On 19 May 2025, Blackburn announced their retained list. The club confirmed they activated the one-year option in the contract of Ryan Hedges. Under-21s players Harrison Wood, Zack Stritch and Adam Khan were also informed that the club had taken up the option to extend their contract by a further year. Tyrhys Dolan, Danny Batth, Andi Weimann, Jake Batty and Felix Goddard were offered new contracts while Lorenze Mullarkey-Matthews was offered his first professional contract.

Dilan Markanday, Jack Vale, Zak Gilsenan, Patrick Gamble, Tom Bloxham, Jordan Eastham, Rhys Doherty, Isaac Whitehall, Jalil Saadi, Alex Baker, Adam Caddick, Paul Murphy-Worrell, Lewis Bell, Bradley Taylor, Jackson Shorrocks, Nathan Willis, Stephen Edmondson and Teddy Ramwell were not retained by the club upon the expiration of their current agreements. The club kept close contact with Adam Forshaw.

=== June ===
On 4 June 2025, Rovers announced u21 goalkeeper Felix Goddard had signed a new 2-year contract until 2027, with the option of a further 12 months.

On 19 June 2025, Rovers announced Adam Forshaw had re-joined the club on a 1-year contract.

=== July ===
On 1 July 2025, Rovers announced Jake Batty had signed a new contract until 2026 with the option of a further 12 months.

On 2 July 2025, Rovers announced u21 midfielder Lorenze Mullarkey-Matthews had signed his first professional contract until 2026.

On 7 July 2025, Rovers announced highly regarded defender Silver Eze had signed a two-year scholarship with the club. Rovers also announced David Odogun had joined as a scholar from Wolverhampton Wanderers.

On 14 July 2025, it was confirmed that first team coach David Lowe would be leaving the club.

On 23 July 2025, it was announced Rovers had appointed Nacho Sancho, who is a strength and conditioning coach. Sancho replaced Karl Hodges, Lead Sports Scientist, who left to join Derby County.

=== August ===
On 12 August 2025, Rovers announced highly rated young goalkeeper Nicholas Michalski has committed his long-term future to the club, new four-year contract at Ewood Park through to June 2029, with a one-year option.

On 15 August 2025, Rovers announced Paul Butler will be the new Under-18s Lead Coach for the upcoming season, He'll be assisted by Ryan Kidd and takes over the role from Darragh Tuffy, who steps up as the new Under-21s assistant coach to support the long-serving Mike Sheron, who'll continue as Under-21s Lead Coach for the coming campaign.

=== September ===
On 3 September 2025, Rovers announced u18 defender Silver Eze had signed his 1st professional contract until 2028, Rovers also announced former forward Jordan Rhodes had rejoined the club as a loan manager.

On 19 September 2025, Rovers announced under 21 head coach Mike Sheron had left the club.

=== November ===
On 10 November 2025, Rovers announced the appointment of Grégory Vignal as the under 21 head coach, it was confirmed Danny Ventre as a set piece coach.

=== January ===
On 28 January 2026, Rovers announced u21 defender Max Davies had signed a contract until 2029, with the option of a further 12 months.

=== February ===
On 2 February 2026, Blackburn announced Valérien Ismaël had left his position as head coach by mutual consent along with assistant head coach Dean Whitehead. Damien Johnson was placed in temporary charge.

On 13 February 2026, Blackburn announced the appointment of Michael O'Neill as head coach on a short-term deal, He took charge of first team matters at the club while continuing in his role as Northern Ireland manager. O'Neill brought in Phil Jones and Steven Davis as new first team coaches. Damien Johnson continued as first team technical coach and head of player development.

On 20 February 2026, Rovers announced u18 midfielder Isaac Dunn had signed his first professional contract until 2028, with the option of a further 12 months.

On 26 February 2026, Rovers announced u18 forward Harvey Higgins had signed his first professional contract until 2028, with the option of a further 12 months.

=== March ===
On 24 March 2026, Rovers announced u18 midfielder Frank Vare had signed his first professional contract until 2028, with the option of a further 12 months.

=== April ===
On 28 April 2026, Rovers announced winger Jayden Sergeant had signed his first professional contract until 2028, with the option of a further 12 months.

On 29 April 2026, Rovers announced midfielder Freddie Leatherbarrow had signed his first professional contract until 2028, with the option of a further 12 months.

=== May ===
On 2 May 2026, Ryōya Morishita was voted Player of the Season, Balázs Tóth was voted Players Player of the Season, Tom Atcheson won Young Player of the Season, Yūki Ōhashi was voted Junior Rovers Player of the Season and Adam Forshaw's goal against Stoke City was voted Goal of the Season.

On 6 May 2026, Rovers announced defender Michael Decandia had signed his first professional contract until 2028, with the option of a further 12 months.

On 11 May 2026, Rovers announced defender Harvey Pates had signed his first professional contract until 2028, with the option of a further 12 months. Rovers also announced u21 head coach Grégory Vignal had left his role.

On 12 May 2026, Rovers announced head coach Michael O'Neill would not be extending his current agreement to become the club's permanent Head Coach beyond the conclusion of his existing period with the club.

On 19 May 2026, Rovers announced midfielder Tyler Mansbridge had signed his first professional contract until 2027, with the option of a further 12 months.

== Backroom staff ==
As of 19 May 2025

=== Senior football ===
| Position | Staff |
|---|---|
| Head Coach | (Northern Ireland) Michael O'Neill |
| Head of Football Operations | (Benin) Rudy Gestede |
| Head of Technical Development | (Wales) Adam Owen |
| First-Team Coach | (England) Phil Jones |
| First-Team Coach | (Northern Ireland) Steven Davis |
| First Team Technical Coach & Head of Player Development | (Northern Ireland) Damien Johnson |
| Goalkeeping Coach | (England) Ben Benson |
| Head of Performance | (Spain) Nacho Sancho |
| Consultant | (England) Dr. Chris Dalton |
| Head of Medical Services | (England) Andrew Procter |
| Loan Manager | (Scotland) Jordan Rhodes |
| Kit Manager | (England) Paul Schofield |

=== Academy football ===
| Position | Staff |
|---|---|
| Head of Academy | (Northern Ireland) Paul Gray |
| Head of Academy Coaching | (England) John Prince |
| Under-21s Lead Coach | (France) Grégory Vignal |
| Under-21s Assistant Coach | (Republic of Ireland) Darragh Tuffy |
| Under-18s Lead Coach | (England) Paul Butler |
| Under-18s Assistant Coach | (England) Ryan Kidd |
| Academy Goalkeeper Coach | (England) Matthew Urwin |
| Head of Academy Sports Science and Medical | (England) Russ Wrigley |
| Head of Academy Recruitment | (England) Michael Cribley |
| Academy Secretary | (England) Dawn Dunn |

== First-team squad ==
Players and squad numbers last updated on 19 May 2025. List is representative of players who have made an appearance for the first-team this season and of information available on Rovers.co.uk.

Note: Flags indicate national team as has been defined under FIFA eligibility rules. Players may hold more than one non-FIFA nationality.

| No. | Pos. | Nat. | Name | Date of birth & age | Year joined | Contract expires | Joined from | Other | Ref |
Goalkeepers
| 34 | GK | (England) | Jack Barrett | 4 June 2002 (age 24) | 2024 | 2027 (+1) | (England) Everton | On loan at Tranmere Rovers, Option for 12-month extension | |
| 37 | GK | (England) | Felix Goddard | 9 March 2004 (age 22) | 2020 | 2027 (+1) | Academy | Option for 12-month extension | |
| 35 | GK | (England) | Nicholas Michalski | 14 March 2007 (age 19) | 2023 | 2029 (+1) | Academy | Option for 12-month extension | |
| 1 | GK | (England) | Aynsley Pears | 23 April 1998 (age 28) | 2020 | 2027 | (England) Middlesbrough | | |
| 22 | GK | (Hungary) | Balázs Tóth | 4 September 1997 (age 29) | 2024 | 2027 | (Hungary) Fehérvár | | |
Defenders
| 38 | DF | (Northern Ireland) | Tom Atcheson | 22 October 2006 (age 20) | 2023 | 2030 | Academy | | |
| 2 | DF | (Nigeria) | Ryan Alebiosu | 17 December 2001 (age 24) | 2025 | 2028 (+1) | (Belgium) Kortrijk | Option for 12-month extension | |
| 17 | DF | (England) | Hayden Carter | 17 December 1999 (age 26) | 2014 | 2027 | Academy | | |
| 20 | DF | (Republic of Ireland) | Eiran Cashin | 9 November 2001 (age 25) | 2026 | 2026 | (England) Brighton & Hove Albion | On loan. | |
| 40 | DF | (England) | Matty Litherland | 31 October 2005 (age 21) | 2011 | 2027 (+1) | Academy | Option for 12-month extension | |
| 15 | DF | (Republic of Ireland) | Sean McLoughlin | 13 November 1996 (age 30) | 2025 | 2027 (+1) | (England) Hull City | Option for 12-month extension | |
| 12 | DF | (Australia) | Lewis Miller | 24 August 2000 (age 26) | 2025 | 2028 (+1) | (Scotland) Hibernian | Option for 12-month extension. | |
| 26 | DF | (Republic of Ireland) | Connor O'Riordan | 19 October 2003 (age 23) | 2024 | 2028 | (England) Crewe Alexandra | | |
| 3 | DF | (England) | Harry Pickering | 29 December 1998 (age 27) | 2021 | 2027 (+1) | (England) Crewe Alexandra | Option for 12-month extension | |
| 44 | DF | (United States) | Brandon Powell | 17 October 2005 (age 21) | 2022 | 2027 (+1) | Academy | On loan at Barrow, Option for 12-month extension | |
| 43 | DF | (England) | George Pratt | 17 September 2003 (age 23) | 2021 | 2030 | Academy | | |
| 4 | DF | (Portugal) | Yuri Ribeiro | 24 January 1997 (age 29) | 2025 | 2027 (+1) | (Portugal) Braga | Option for 12-month extension | |
| 16 | DF | (England) | Scott Wharton | 3 October 1997 (age 29) | 2010 | 2028 (+1) | Academy | Option for 12-month extension | |
Midfielders
| 24 | MF | (France) | Moussa Baradji | 20 November 2000 (age 25) | 2025 | 2026 | (Switzerland) Yverdon Sport | On loan with an option for the move to be made permanent. | |
| 10 | MF | (England) | Todd Cantwell | 27 March 1998 (age 28) | 2024 | 2027 | (Scotland) Rangers | | |
| 14 | MF | (Belgium) | Dion De Neve | 12 June 2001 (age 25) | 2025 | 2028 (+1) | (Belgium) Kortrijk | Option for 12-month extension. | |
| 36 | MF | (England) | James Edmondson | 1 November 2005 (age 21) | 2011 | 2027 | Academy | On loan at Macclesfield | |
| 28 | MF | (England) | Adam Forshaw | 8 October 1991 (age 35) | 2025 | 2027 | (England) Plymouth Argyle | | |
| 30 | MF | (England) | Jake Garrett | 10 March 2003 (age 23) | 2013 | 2027 | Academy | | |
| 5 | MF | (England) | Taylor Gardner-Hickman | 30 December 2001 (age 24) | 2026 | 2027 | (England) Birmingham City | On loan with an option for the move to be made permanent. | |
| 18 | MF | (Sweden) | Axel Henriksson | 16 April 2002 (age 24) | 2025 | 2029 (+1) | (Sweden) GAIS | Option for 12-month extension | |
| 31 | MF | (Scotland) | Kristi Montgomery | 31 May 2004 (age 22) | 2013 | 2026 (+1) | Academy | Option for 12-month extension | |
| 25 | MF | (Japan) | Ryōya Morishita | 11 April 1997 (age 29) | 2025 | 2028 (+1) | (Poland) Legia Warsaw | Option for 12-month extension | |
| 41 | MF | (England) | Lorenze Mullarkey-Matthews | 20 February 2007 (age 19) | 2014 | | Academy | | . |
| 8 | MF | (Portugal) | Sidnei Tavares | 29 September 2001 (age 25) | 2025 | 2028 | (Portugal) Moreirense | | |
| 6 | MF | (Norway) | Sondre Tronstad | 26 August 1995 (age 31) | 2023 | 2026 | (Netherlands) Vitesse | | |
| 53 | MF | (England) | Frank Vare | 12 September 2007 (age 19) | 2024 | 2028 (+1) | Academy | Option for 12-month extension | |
Forwards
| 21 | FW | (England) | Dapo Afolayan | 11 September 1997 (age 29) | 2026 | 2027 | (Germany) St Pauli | | |
| 52 | FW | (England) | Nathan Dlamini | 11 April 2007 (age 19) | 2023 | 2026 | (England) Aston Villa | | |
| 47 | FW | (Northern Ireland) | Aodhan Doherty | 3 May 2006 (age 20) | 2024 | 2027 | (Northern Ireland) Linfield | | |
| 11 | FW | (Iceland) | Andri Guðjohnsen | 29 January 2002 (age 24) | 2025 | | (Belgium) Gent | | |
| 19 | FW | (Wales) | Ryan Hedges | 8 July 1995 (age 31) | 2022 | 2026 | (Scotland) Aberdeen | | |
| 29 | FW | (Denmark) | Mathias Jørgensen | 20 September 2000 (age 26) | 2026 | 2029 (+1) | (Norway) Bodø/Glimt | Option for 12-month extension | |
| 54 | FW | (England) | Valentin Joseph | 4 June 2008 (age 18) | 2024 | 2026 | Academy | | |
| 7 | FW | (Sierra Leone) | Augustus Kargbo | 24 August 1999 (age 27) | 2025 | 2027 | (Italy) Cesena | | |
| 23 | FW | (Japan) | Yūki Ōhashi | 27 July 1996 (age 30) | 2024 | 2027 (+1) | (Japan) Sanfrecce Hiroshima | Option for 12-month extension | |
| 27 | FW | (England) | Nathan Redmond | 6 March 1994 (age 32) | 2026 | 2026 | (England) Sheffield Wednesday | | |
| 32 | FW | (England) | Igor Tyjon | 20 March 2008 (age 18) | 2023 | 2026 | Academy | | |

== Transfers and contracts ==
=== In ===
| Date | Pos. | Player | From | Fee | Ref. |
|---|---|---|---|---|---|
| 10 June 2025 | LM | (Belgium) Dion De Neve | (Belgium) Kortrijk | £800,000 | |
| 20 June 2025 | CM | (Portugal) Sidnei Tavares | (Portugal) Moreirense | £2,000,000 | |
| 1 July 2025 | CM | (England) Finley Wilkinson (Note: Signed initially for the Under-18s) | (England) Accrington Stanley | Free Transfer | |
| 7 July 2025 | RB | (Nigeria) David Odogun | (England) Wolverhampton Wanderers | Free Transfer | |
| 10 July 2025 | RB | (Nigeria) Ryan Alebiosu | (Belgium) Kortrijk | £500,000 | |
| 19 July 2025 | CB | (Republic of Ireland) Sean McLoughlin | (England) Hull City | £500,000 | |
| 4 August 2025 | RB | (Australia) Lewis Miller | (Scotland) Hibernian | £1,000,000 | |
| 6 August 2025 | CAM | (Sweden) Axel Henriksson | (Sweden) GAIS | £1,500,000 | |
| 25 August 2025 | LM | (Japan) Ryōya Morishita | (Poland) Legia Warsaw | £1,700,000 | |
| 31 August 2025 | CF | (Iceland) Andri Guðjohnsen | (Belgium) Gent | £1,700,000 | |
| 15 January 2026 | CF | (Denmark) Mathias Jørgensen | (Norway) Bodø/Glimt | £3,500,000 | |
| 1 February 2026 | RW | (England) Dapo Afolayan | (Germany) St Pauli | undisclosed | |
| 2 February 2026 | LW | (Sierra Leone) Osman Kamara (Note: Signed initially for the Under-21s) | (England) Arsenal | Free Transfer | |
| 27 March 2026 | RW | (England) Nathan Redmond | Free Agent | Free Transfer | |

Expenditure: ▼ ~ £13,200,000

=== Out ===
| Date | Pos. | Player | To | Fee | Ref. |
|---|---|---|---|---|---|
| 11 July 2025 | CM | (England) Joe Rankin-Costello | (England) Charlton Athletic | £1,000,000 | |
| 4 August 2025 | RB | (England) Callum Brittain | (England) Middlesbrough | £3,500,000 | |
| 26 August 2025 | CM | (England) John Buckley | (Saudi Arabia) Al-Kholood | £1,000,000 | |
| 27 August 2025 | CDM | (England) Lewis Travis | (England) Derby County | £3,000,000 | |
| 1 September 2025 | CF | (England) Harry Leonard | (England) Peterborough United | £1,000,000 | |
| 1 September 2025 | CB | (Scotland) Dominic Hyam | (Wales) Wrexham | £2,700,000 | |
| 13 January 2026 | CF | (Senegal) Makhtar Gueye | (China) Shanghai Shenhua | £1,800,000 | |
| 2 February 2026 | CB | (England) Charlie Olson | (England) Altrincham | Free Transfer | |
| 2 February 2026 | LB | (England) Jake Batty | (England) Swindon Town | Undisclosed | |
| 4 February 2026 | GK | (England) Solomon Honor | (England) Manchester United | Undisclosed | |

Income: ▲ ~ £14,000,000

=== Loaned in ===
| Date | Pos. | Player | From | Date until | Ref. |
|---|---|---|---|---|---|
| 22 August 2025 | CM | (France) Moussa Baradji | (Switzerland) Yverdon Sport | 31 May 2026 | |
| 1 September 2025 | CM | (England) Taylor Gardner-Hickman | (England) Birmingham City | 31 May 2026 | |
| 6 January 2026 | CB | (Republic of Ireland) Eiran Cashin | (England) Brighton & Hove Albion | 31 May 2026 | |

=== Loaned out ===
| Date | Pos. | Player | To | Date until | Ref. |
|---|---|---|---|---|---|
| 27 June 2025 | CB | (Republic of Ireland) Connor O'Riordan | (England) Doncaster Rovers | 2 January 2026 (Note: On 2 January, O'Riordan was recalled from his loan at Doncaster) | |
| 11 August 2025 | CB | (England) Charlie Olson | (England) Oldham Athletic | 2 January 2026 (Note: On 2 January, Olson was recalled from his loan at Oldham) | |
| 20 August 2025 | RB | (United States) Leo Duru | (United States) San Diego | 7 March 2026 (Note: On 31 December, Duru's loan at San Diego was extended until the end of June, but then on 7 March he was recalled and subsequently joined Birmingham Legion on loan) | |
| 1 September 2025 | GK | (England) Jack Barrett | (England) Tranmere Rovers | 31 May 2026 (Note: On 2 January, Barrett's loan at Tranmere was extended until the end of the season) | |
| 2 September 2025 | CM | (England) Harley O'Grady-Macken | (England) Oldham Athletic | 1 January 2026 | |
| 4 September 2025 | CM | (England) James Edmondson | (England) Macclesfield | 31 May 2026 (Note: On 2 January, Edmondson's loan at Macclesfield was extended until the end of January. Then on 2 February it was extended again until the end of the season) | |
| 6 September 2025 | CB | (England) George Pratt | (England) Chorley | 8 November 2025 (Note: On 3 October, Pratt's loan at Chorley was extended by a further month. Then on 4 November, it was extended again until January. Then four days later, Pratt was recalled) | |
| 7 October 2025 | RW | (England) Harrison Wood | (England) Warrington Rylands | 31 May 2026 (Note: On 2 January, Wood's loan at Warrington Rylands was extended until the end of January. Then on 2 February it was extended again until the end of the season) | |
| 10 October 2025 | CM | (Hungary) Patrik Farkas | (England) Prescot Cables | 11 January 2026 | |
| 14 November 2025 | CF | (England) Joe Boggan | (England) FC United of Manchester | 11 December 2025 | |
| 14 November 2025 | CF | (England) Jayden Sergeant | (England) Bootle | 11 December 2025 | |
| 14 November 2025 | GK | (England) Blake Wolsoncroft | (England) Hyde United | 11 December 2025 | |
| 29 January 2026 | LB | (United States) Brandon Powell | (England) Barrow | 31 May 2026 | |
| 24 February 2026 | CAM | (England) Zack Stritch | (England) Curzon Ashton | 31 May 2026 | |
| 7 March 2026 | RB | (United States) Leo Duru | (United States) Birmingham Legion | 30 June 2026 | |
| 27 March 2026 | CM | (England) Harley O'Grady-Macken | (England) Radcliffe | 31 May 2026 | |

=== Released / Out of Contract ===
| Date | Pos. | Player | Subsequent club | Join date | Ref. |
|---|---|---|---|---|---|
| 30 June 2025 | CB | (England) Danny Batth | (England) Derby County | 1 July 2025 | |
| 30 June 2025 | GK | (England) Jordan Eastham | (England) Ashton United | 1 July 2025 | |
| 30 June 2025 | RW | (England) Dilan Markanday | (England) Chesterfield | 1 July 2025 | |
| 30 June 2025 | CF | (Austria) Andreas Weimann | (England) Derby County | 1 July 2025 | |
| 30 June 2025 | DM | (Morocco) Jalil Saadi | (Cyprus) Ethnikos Achna | 1 July 2025 | |
| 30 June 2025 | AM | (Republic of Ireland) Zak Gilsenan | (England) Grimsby Town | 2 July 2025 | |
| 30 June 2025 | CM | (England) Nathan Willis | (England) Barnsley | 15 July 2025 | |
| 30 June 2025 | CM | (England) Paul Murphy-Worrell | (England) Southport | 16 July 2025 | |
| 30 June 2025 | RW | (England) Tyrhys Dolan | (Spain) Espanyol | 25 July 2025 | |
| 30 June 2025 | CM | (England) Adam Caddick | (England) Warrington Rylands | 30 July 2025 | |
| 30 June 2025 | RW | (England) Lewis Bell | (England) Marine | 30 July 2025 | |
| 30 June 2025 | CB | (England) Rhys Docherty | (England) King's Lynn Town | 1 August 2025 | |
| 30 June 2025 | CM | (England) Jackson Shorrocks | (England) Huddersfield Town | 6 August 2025 | |
| 30 June 2025 | CM | (England) Bradley Taylor | (England) Ashton United | 8 August 2025 | |
| 30 June 2025 | CB | (England) Patrick Gamble | (England) Warrington Town | 16 August 2025 | |
| 30 June 2025 | AM | (England) Daniel Shaw | (England) Rugby Town | 18 August 2025 | |
| 30 June 2025 | CB | (England) Teddy Ramwell | (Spain) Almunecar City | 28 August 2025 | |
| 30 June 2025 | CF | (Wales) Jack Vale | (England) Northampton Town | 18 September 2025 | |
| 30 June 2025 | LW | (Republic of Ireland) Tom Bloxham | (Switzerland) Grasshoppers | 22 September 2025 | |
| 30 June 2025 | CM | (England) Stephen Edmondson | (England) Bootle | 8 November 2025 | |
| 30 June 2025 | DM | (England) Isaac Whitehall | (England) Workington | 7 December 2025 | |
| 30 June 2025 | CF | (England) Alex Baker | | | |
| 20 August 2025 | CF | (France) Exaucé Mafoumbi | (Switzerland) Lausanne Ouchy | 21 August 2025 | |

=== New Contract ===
| Date | Pos. | Player | Contract expiry | Ref. |
|---|---|---|---|---|
| 4 June 2025 | GK | (England) Felix Goddard | 30 June 2027 (Note: Option of a further year) | |
| 19 June 2025 | CM | (England) Adam Forshaw | 30 June 2026 | |
| 1 July 2025 | LB | (England) Jake Batty | 30 June 2027 | |
| 2 July 2025 | CM | (England) Lorenze Mullarkey-Matthews | 30 June 2026 (Note: First professional contract) | |
| 12 August 2025 | GK | (England) Nicholas Michalski | 30 June 2029 | |
| 3 September 2025 | CB | (Italy) Silver Eze | 30 June 2028 | |
| 3 October 2025 | CB | (England) Scott Wharton | 30 June 2028 | |
| 28 January 2026 | CB | (England) Max Davies | 30 June 2029 | |
| 20 February 2026 | CM | (England) Isaac Dunn | 30 June 2028 | |
| 26 February 2026 | CF | (England) Harvey Higgins | 30 June 2028 | |
| 24 March 2026 | CM | (England) Frank Vare | 30 June 2028 | |
| 1 April 2026 | CB | (Northern Ireland) Tom Atcheson | 30 June 2030 | |
| 1 April 2026 | CB | (England) George Pratt | 30 June 2030 | |
| 28 April 2026 | LW | (England) Jayden Sergeant | 30 June 2028 | |
| 29 April 2026 | CM | (England) Freddie Leatherbarrow | 30 June 2028 | |
| 30 April 2026 | CM | (England) Adam Forshaw | 30 June 2027 | |
| 6 May 2026 | CB | (Italy) Michael Decandia | 30 June 2028 | |
| 12 May 2026 | LB | (England) Harvey Pates | 30 June 2028 | |
| 13 May 2026 | CF | (Iceland) Andri Guðjohnsen | | |
| 15 May 2026 | CM | (England) Lorenze Mullarkey-Matthews | | |
| 19 May 2026 | CM | (England) Tyler Mansbridge | 30 June 2027 | |

== Pre-season and friendlies ==
On 23 April, Blackburn Rovers announced they would spend a week in Spain as part of their pre-season preparations, which would also includes two friendlies at the Pinatar Arena against Qatar and Elche. Then on 3 June, the first two oppositions were added to the schedule, against Everton and Accrington Stanley. A fifth friendly was later added in July, against NEC Nijmegen.

Win Draw Loss Fixtures

| 12 July 2025 Friendly | Accrington Stanley | 1–2 | Blackburn Rovers | Accrington |
| 15:00 BST | Caton 50' | Report | Ōhashi 31'; Gueye 84' | Stadium: Crown Ground |

| 19 July 2025 Friendly | Blackburn Rovers | 1–0 | Everton | Blackburn |
| 15:00 BST | De Neve 7' | Report | | Stadium: Ewood Park; Attendance: 11,399 (4,541 away) |

| 22 July 2025 Friendly | Blackburn Rovers | 5–1 | Qatar | San Pedro del Pinatar, Spain |
| 19:00 CEST | Ōhashi 8', 20'; Cantwell 52'; Tyjon 82'; Kargbo 87' | Report | Joao Pedro 41' | Stadium: Pinatar Arena |

| 25 July 2025 Friendly | Elche | 0–1 | Blackburn Rovers | San Pedro del Pinatar, Spain |
| 19:00 CEST | | Report | Gueye 69' | Stadium: Pinatar Arena |

| 2 August 2025 Friendly | NEC Nijmegen | 3–1 | Blackburn Rovers | Nijmegen, Netherlands |
| 19:00 CEST | Chery 22', 38'; Shiogai 72' | | Kargbo 52' | Stadium: Goffertstadion |

== Competitions ==
=== Overall record ===
| Competition | First match | Last match | Starting round | Final position | Record | | | | | | | |
| Competition | First match | Last match | Starting round | Final position | Pld | W | D | L | GF | GA | GD | Win % |
|---|---|---|---|---|---|---|---|---|---|---|---|---|
| Championship | 9 August 2025 | 2 May 2026 | Matchday 1 | 20th | 46 | 13 | 13 | 20 | 42 | 56 | −14 | 28.26 |
| FA Cup | 11 January 2026 | | Third round | Third round | 1 | 0 | 1 | 0 | 0 | 0 | +0 | 0.00 |
| EFL Cup | 12 August 2025 | | First round | First round | 1 | 0 | 0 | 1 | 1 | 2 | −1 | 0.00 |
| Total | | | | | 48 | 13 | 14 | 21 | 43 | 58 | −15 | 27.08 |

Source: Soccerway

=== Championship ===
==== League table ====
| Pos | Team | Pld | W | D | L | GF | GA | GD | Pts | Promotion, qualification or relegation |
|---|---|---|---|---|---|---|---|---|---|---|
| 18 | Portsmouth | 46 | 14 | 13 | 19 | 49 | 64 | −15 | 55 | |
| 19 | Charlton Athletic | 46 | 13 | 14 | 19 | 44 | 58 | −14 | 53 | |
| 20 | Blackburn Rovers | 46 | 13 | 13 | 20 | 42 | 56 | −14 | 52 | |
| 21 | West Bromwich Albion | 46 | 13 | 14 | 19 | 48 | 58 | −10 | 51 (Note: West Bromwich Albion were deducted two points on 24 April 2026 for breaching PSR rules.) | |
| 22 | Oxford United (R) | 46 | 11 | 14 | 21 | 45 | 59 | −14 | 47 | Relegation to EFL League One |

Source: EFL Official Website
Rules for classification: 1) Points; 2) Goal difference; 3) Number of goals scored; 4) Head-to-head results; 5) Wins; 6) Away goals; 7) Penalty points (sec 9.5); 8) Number of 12-point sending off offences; 9) Play-off (only if needed to determine promotion/relegation)
(R) Relegated

==== Results summary ====
| Overall | | | | | | | | Home | | | | | | Away | | | | | |
| Pld | W | D | L | GF | GA | GD | Pts | W | D | L | GF | GA | GD | W | D | L | GF | GA | GD |
|---|---|---|---|---|---|---|---|---|---|---|---|---|---|---|---|---|---|---|---|
| 46 | 13 | 13 | 20 | 42 | 56 | −14 | 52 | 4 | 9 | 10 | 19 | 27 | −8 | 9 | 4 | 10 | 23 | 29 | −6 |

Source: Soccerway

==== Results by round ====
| Round | 1 | 2 | 3 | 4 | 5 | 7 | 8 | 9 | 10 | 11 | 12 | 13 | 14 | 15 | 16 | 17 | 18 | 6^{1} | 20 | 21 | 22 | 23 | 24 | 25 | 26 | 27 | 28 | 29 | 30 | 19^{2} | 31 | 32 | 33 | 34 | 35 | 36 | 37 | 38 | 39 | 40 | 41 | 42 | 45 | 43 | 44 | 46 |
|---|---|---|---|---|---|---|---|---|---|---|---|---|---|---|---|---|---|---|---|---|---|---|---|---|---|---|---|---|---|---|---|---|---|---|---|---|---|---|---|---|---|---|---|---|---|---|
| Ground | A | H | A | H | A | A | H | H | A | H | H | A | A | H | A | H | A | H | H | A | H | A | A | H | H | A | A | H | H | H | A | A | H | H | A | H | A | A | H | A | H | A | A | H | A | H |
| Result | L | L | W | L | W | L | L | D | L | L | W | W | W | L | W | L | D | D | D | L | W | D | D | L | D | L | L | D | L | W | L | W | W | L | L | D | L | W | D | W | D | D | L | D | W | L |
| Position | 19 | 21 | 16 | 19 | 18 | 20 | 22 | 21 | 22 | 23 | 21 | 19 | 18 | 19 | 18 | 18 | 18 | 18 | 20 | 20 | 20 | 18 | 19 | 20 | 20 | 20 | 22 | 22 | 22 | 21 | 22 | 20 | 20 | 20 | 20 | 20 | 20 | 19 | 19 | 19 | 19 | 19 | 20 | 21 | 19 | 20 |
| Points | 0 | 0 | 3 | 3 | 6 | 6 | 6 | 7 | 7 | 7 | 10 | 13 | 16 | 16 | 19 | 19 | 20 | 21 | 22 | 22 | 25 | 26 | 27 | 27 | 28 | 28 | 28 | 29 | 29 | 32 | 32 | 35 | 38 | 38 | 38 | 39 | 39 | 42 | 43 | 46 | 47 | 48 | 48 | 49 | 52 | 52 |

Source: EFL
A = Away; H = Home; W = Win; D = Draw; L = Loss; P = Postponed; AB = Abandoned
Notes:
- ^{1} Matchday 6 (vs Ipswich Town) was abandoned due to a waterlogged pitch.
- ^{2} Matchday 19 (vs Sheffield Wednesday) was abandoned due to a waterlogged pitch.
- ^{3} Matchday 45 (vs Southampton) was brought forward due to opposition in FA Cup semi-final involvements.

==== Matches ====
On 26 June, the EFL Championship fixtures were announced, with Blackburn visiting West Bromwich Albion on the opening weekend.

Win Draw Loss Fixtures

| 9 August 2025 1 | West Bromwich Albion | 1–0 | Blackburn Rovers | West Bromwich |
| 15:00 BST | Price 15'; Phillips (yellow card) 47'; Grant (yellow card) 49'; Furlong (yellow card) 79' (yellow-red card) 90+5' | Report | | Stadium: The Hawthorns; Referee: David Webb |

| 16 August 2025 2 | Blackburn Rovers | 1–2 | Birmingham City | Blackburn |
| 15:00 BST | Cantwell 50'; McLoughlin (yellow card) 90+8' | Report | Osayi-Samuel (yellow card) 30'; Iwata (yellow card) 76'; Stansfield 90' (pen.); Dykes 90+8' | Stadium: Ewood Park; Attendance: 19,552; Referee: Oliver Langford |

| 23 August 2025 3 | Hull City | 0–3 | Blackburn Rovers | Kingston upon Hull |
| 12:30 BST | Slater (yellow card) 12'; Lundstram (yellow card) 37'; McBurnie (yellow card) 90+6' | Report | Hedges 18'; Tavares (yellow card) 43'; Ōhashi 47'; Cantwell 50'; Henriksson (yellow card) 85'; McLoughlin (yellow card) 90+6' | Stadium: MKM Stadium; Attendance: 20,518; Referee: Tom Nield |
Note: Fixture was originally scheduled for a 15:00 kick-off, but was moved for live Sky Sports broadcasting.

| 30 August 2025 4 | Blackburn Rovers | 0–2 | Norwich City | Blackburn |
| 15:00 BST | McLoughlin (red card) 44'; Tronstad (yellow card) 52'; Cantwell (yellow card) 81' | Report | Sargent 45' (pen.), 90+1' | Stadium: Ewood Park; Attendance: 13,580; Referee: Benjamin Speedie |

| 13 September 2025 5 | Watford | 0–1 | Blackburn Rovers | Watford |
| 15:00 BST | Pollock (yellow card) 67' | Report | Morishita 47'; Cantwell (yellow card) 58'; Hedges (yellow card) 88' | Stadium: Vicarage Road; Attendance: 17,964; Referee: Dean Whitestone |

| 27 September 2025 7 | Charlton Athletic | 3–0 | Blackburn Rovers | Charlton |
| 15:00 BST | Gillesphey 31'; Jones (yellow card) 39'; Bree (yellow card) 58', (goal) 90+4'; Carey (yellow card) 65', (goal) 78'; Bell (yellow card) 90+1' | Report | Miller (yellow card) 71'; Gardner-Hickman (yellow card) 90+1' | Stadium: The Valley; Attendance: 19,004 (1,567 away); Referee: Anthony Backhouse |

| 30 September 2025 8 | Blackburn Rovers | 1–2 | Swansea City | Blackburn |
| 19:45 BST | Cantwell 28', (yellow card) 87'; McLoughlin (yellow card) 36'; Tronstad (yellow card) 79' | Report | Franco 44'; Cullen 67'; Tymon (yellow card) 72'; Burgess (yellow card) 74' | Stadium: Ewood Park; Attendance: 11,013 (372 away); Referee: Leigh Doughty |

| 4 October 2025 9 | Blackburn Rovers | 1–1 | Stoke City | Blackburn |
| 12:30 BST | Alebiosu (yellow card) 36'; Kargbo 82'; Cantwell (yellow card) 90+1' | Report | Rigo (yellow card) 49'; Manhoef 49' | Stadium: Ewood Park; Attendance: 14,061 (3,866 away); Referee: Ruebyn Ricardo |
Note: Fixture was originally scheduled for a 15:00 kick-off, but was moved for live Sky Sports broadcasting.

| 18 October 2025 10 | Coventry City | 2–0 | Blackburn Rovers | Coventry |
| 15:00 BST | Torp 57'; Thomas-Asante 59' | Report | Tronstad (yellow card) 18'; Hedges (yellow card) 56' | Stadium: Coventry Building Society Arena; Attendance: 29,606; Referee: Sam Allison |

| 21 October 2025 11 | Blackburn Rovers | 1–3 | Sheffield United | Blackburn |
| 19:45 BST | Ōhashi 40'; Gardner-Hickman (yellow card) 61' | Report | Henriksson 54' (o.g.); Peck (yellow card) 61'; Burrows 70'; Campbell 90+2' | Stadium: Ewood Park; Attendance: 12,104 (1,504 away); Referee: David Webb |

| 25 October 2025 12 | Blackburn Rovers | 2–1 | Southampton | Blackburn |
| 15:00 BST | Gardner-Hickman (yellow card) 20'; Wharton (yellow card) 34'; Tronstad (yellow card) 45+3'; Alebiosu 76'; Guðjohnsen 86' | Report | Quarshie (yellow card) 19'; Scienza 20'; Welington (red card) 90+4' | Stadium: Ewood Park; Attendance: 13,686 (2,294 away); Referee: Bobby Madley |

| 1 November 2025 13 | Leicester City | 0–2 | Blackburn Rovers | Leicester |
| 12:30 GMT | | Report | Henriksson (yellow card) 23'; Guðjohnsen 20', 63' | Stadium: King Power Stadium; Referee: Tom Nield |
Note: Fixture was originally scheduled for a 15:00 kick-off, but was moved for live Sky Sports broadcasting.

| 4 November 2025 14 | Bristol City | 0–1 | Blackburn Rovers | Bristol |
| 19:45 GMT | | Report | Guðjohnsen (yellow card) 37'; Ōhashi 45+5'; Tronstad (yellow card) 51'; Gueye (yellow card) 90+2' | Stadium: Ashton Gate; Attendance: 21,499; Referee: Dean Whitestone |

| 8 November 2025 15 | Blackburn Rovers | 1–2 | Derby County | Blackburn |
| 12:30 GMT | Gardner-Hickman (yellow card) 14'; Ōhashi 66' (pen.) | Report | Morris 19'; Agyemang 45'; Clark (yellow card) 69'; Adams (yellow card) 87'; Salvesen (yellow card) 90+3' | Stadium: Ewood Park; Attendance: 20,147 (2,736 away); Referee: Thomas Kirk |
Note: Fixture was originally scheduled for a 15:00 kick-off, but was moved for live Sky Sports broadcasting.

| 21 November 2025 16 | Preston North End | 1–2 | Blackburn Rovers | Preston |
| 20:00 GMT | Devine 45+1'; Whiteman (yellow card) 90+3' | | Miller 45'; Guðjohnsen 62' | Stadium: Deepdale; Attendance: 21,635; Referee: Paul Tierney |
Note: Fixture was originally scheduled for 22 November, but was moved for live Sky Sports broadcasting.

| 26 November 2025 17 | Blackburn Rovers | 0–1 | Queens Park Rangers | Blackburn |
| 19:45 GMT | McLoughlin (yellow card) 22'; Hedges (yellow card) 37'; Ōhashi (yellow card) 90+1' | Report | Smyth 78' | Stadium: Ewood Park; Referee: Adam Herczeg |

| 29 November 2025 18 | Wrexham | 1–1 | Blackburn Rovers | Wrexham |
| 15:00 GMT | James (yellow card) 76'; Cleworth 90+5' | Report | Gudjohnsen 13'; Forshaw (yellow card) 64'; Pears (yellow card) 81'; Gardner-Hickman (yellow card) 90+7' | Stadium: Racecourse Ground; Attendance: 10,643; Referee: Tom Reeves |

| 2 December 2025 6 | Blackburn Rovers | 1–1 | Ipswich Town | Blackburn |
| 19:45 GMT | Gardner-Hickman (yellow card) 50'; Guðjohnsen 76' | Report | Kipré (yellow card) 26'; Matusiwa (yellow card) 45'; Davis (yellow card) 49'; Walle Egeli 90+4' | Stadium: Ewood Park; Attendance: 16,032; Referee: Oliver Langford |
Note: Fixture was originally scheduled for 20 September, but was abandoned in the 80th minute due to an unplayable surface.

| 9 December 2025 20 | Blackburn Rovers | 1–1 | Oxford United | Blackburn |
| 19:45 GMT | Tavares (yellow card) 56'; Cantwell 78' (pen.) | Report | De Keersmaecker (yellow card) 41'; Brown 45+1'; Harris (yellow card) 87' | Stadium: Ewood Park; Attendance: 10,255; Referee: Leigh Doughty |

| 13 December 2025 21 | Portsmouth | 2–1 | Blackburn Rovers | Milton |
| 15:00 GMT | Matthews (yellow card) 54'; Lang (yellow card) 59', (goal) 62'; Bowat 79' | Report | Ōhashi (yellow card) 28', (goal) 36'; Alebiosu (yellow card) 35'; Miller (yellow card) 45+4' | Stadium: Fratton Park; Attendance: 19,652 (695 away); Referee: Tim Robinson |

| 20 December 2025 22 | Blackburn Rovers | 2–0 | Millwall | Blackburn |
| 12:30 GMT | Guðjohnsen 3'; McLoughlin (yellow card) 33'; Ōhashi 45', (yellow card) 78'; Cantwell (yellow card) 54' | | Neghli (yellow card) 45'; Crama (yellow card) 53'; Bryan (yellow card) 89' | Stadium: Ewood Park; Attendance: Samuel Allison; Referee: 11,657 |
Note: Fixture was originally scheduled for a 15:00 kick-off, but was moved live Sky Sports broadcasting.

| 26 December 2025 23 | Middlesbrough | 0–0 | Blackburn Rovers | Middlesbrough |
| 15:00 GMT | Gilbert (yellow card) 31'; Hackney (yellow card) 80' | | Morishita (yellow card) 32'; Baradji (yellow card) 57' | Stadium: Riverside Stadium; Attendance: 31,475; Referee: James Bell |

| 29 December 2025 24 | Sheffield Wednesday | 0–0 | Blackburn Rovers | Owlerton |
| 19:45 GMT | Bannan (yellow card) 57'; Lowe (yellow card) 60' | Report | Tronstad (yellow card) 68'; Gardner-Hickman (yellow card) 85'; Cantwell (yellow card) 89' | Stadium: Hillsborough Stadium; Attendance: 22,532; Referee: Oliver Langford |

| 1 January 2026 25 | Blackburn Rovers | 0–2 | Wrexham | Blackburn |
| 12:30 GMT | Baradji (yellow card) 30'; Cantwell (yellow card) 37'; Miller (yellow card) 67'; Tronstad (yellow card) 75' | | Smith 11', (yellow card) 45+1'; Rathbone 38'; Dobson (yellow card) 46' | Stadium: Ewood Park; Referee: Thomas Kirk |
Note: Fixture was originally scheduled for a 15:00 kick-off, but was moved live Sky Sports broadcasting.

| 4 January 2026 26 | Blackburn Rovers | 2–2 | Charlton Athletic | Blackburn |
| 15:00 GMT | Baradji 37', 77'; O'Riordan (yellow card) 48' | Report | Kelman 28', 34' (pen.); Gillesphey (yellow card) 50'; Coventry (yellow card) 61'; Jones (yellow card) 87'; Bree (yellow card) 90+5' | Stadium: Ewood Park; Attendance: 11,367 (538 away); Referee: David Webb |

| 17 January 2026 27 | Ipswich Town | 3–0 | Blackburn Rovers | Ipswich |
| 12:30 GMT | Cashin 3' (o.g.); Taylor 12'; Szmodics 88' | Report | Atcheson (yellow card) 25'; Tronstad (yellow card) 69'; Cantwell (yellow card) 81'; Cashin (yellow card) 86' | Stadium: Portman Road; Attendance: 26,715; Referee: Andrew Kitchen |
Note: Fixture was originally scheduled for a 15:00 kick-off, but was rescheduled for live Sky Sports broadcasting.

| 20 January 2026 28 | Swansea City | 3–1 | Blackburn Rovers | Landore |
| 19:45 GMT | Vipotnik 21', 63'; O'Riordan 50' (o.g.); Ronald (yellow card) 85'; Burgess (yellow card) 90+4' | Report | O'Riordan (yellow card) 11'; Jørgensen 35'; Powell (yellow card) 45+1'; Forshaw (yellow card) 90+1' | Stadium: Swansea.com Stadium; Attendance: 13,897; Referee: Anthony Backhouse |

| 24 January 2026 29 | Blackburn Rovers | 1–1 | Watford | Blackburn |
| 15:00 GMT | Miller 28' | Report | Kayembe 26', (yellow card) 90+3'; Kyprianou (yellow card) 45+2' | Stadium: Ewood Park; Attendance: 11,640; Referee: Adam Herczeg |

| 31 January 2026 30 | Blackburn Rovers | 0–1 | Hull City | Blackburn |
| 15:00 GMT | Cantwell (yellow card) 37'; McLoughlin (yellow card) 82' | Report | Koumas 81' | Stadium: Ewood Park; Attendance: 13,769; Referee: Thomas Bramall |

| 3 February 2026 19 | Blackburn Rovers | 1–0 | Sheffield Wednesday | Blackburn |
| 19:45 GMT | Cashin 12'; Baradji (yellow card) 47' | Report | | Stadium: Ewood Park; Attendance: 12,285; Referee: Dean Whitestone |
Note: Fixture was originally scheduled for 6 December, but was abandoned on 59 minutes after the referee, Ruebyn Ricardo, deemed the pitch unplayable.

| 7 February 2026 31 | Norwich City | 2–0 | Blackburn Rovers | Norwich |
| 12:30 GMT | Ben Slimane 73', (yellow card) 74'; Touré 78'; Field (yellow card) 83' | Report | Cashin (yellow card) 88'; Cantwell (yellow card) 88' | Stadium: Carrow Road; Attendance: 25,628; Referee: James Linington |
Note: Fixture was originally scheduled for a 15:00 kick-off, but was rescheduled for live Sky Sports broadcasting.

| 14 February 2026 32 | Queens Park Rangers | 1–3 | Blackburn Rovers | Shepherd's Bush |
| 15:00 GMT | Saitō 35'; Hayden (yellow card) 38'; Vale (yellow card) 78' | Report | Jørgensen 21', 40'; McLouglin (yellow card) 36'; Morishita 50', (yellow card) 84'; Cashin (yellow card) 90+2' | Stadium: Loftus Road; Attendance: 16,607; Referee: Stephen Martin |

| 20 February 2026 33 | Blackburn Rovers | 1–0 | Preston North End | Blackburn |
| 20:00 GMT | Carter (yellow card) 40'; Cashin (yellow card) 90+1'; Ohashi 90+5' | Report | Lang (yellow card) 70'; Small (yellow card) 90+7' | Stadium: Ewood Park; Referee: Anthony Backhouse |
Note: Fixture was originally scheduled for 21 February, but was rescheduled for live Sky Sports broadcasting.

| 24 February 2026 34 | Blackburn Rovers | 1–2 | Bristol City | Blackburn |
| 19:45 GMT | Ōhashi 6', (yellow card) 42'; Morishita (yellow card) 30' | Report | Riis 17'; Twine 31'; Morsy (yellow card) 45+3'; Knight (yellow card) 86' | Stadium: Ewood Park; Attendance: 10,999; Referee: Matthew Donohue |
Note: Fixture was originally scheduled for 25 February, but was rescheduled due to Bristol City also playing on the Friday night.

| 28 February 2026 35 | Derby County | 3–1 | Blackburn Rovers | Derby |
| 12:30 GMT | Szmodics (yellow card) 36'; Travis (yellow card) 45'; Clark (yellow card) 46'; Brereton Díaz 55'; Clarke 74'; Brewster 82' | Report | Forshaw (yellow card) 36'; Carter 45+1', (yellow card) 79'; Cashin (yellow card) 58'; Ribeiro (yellow card) 60' | Stadium: Pride Park Stadium; Attendance: 27,831; Referee: Leigh Doughty |
Note: Fixture was originally scheduled for a 15:00 kick-off, but was rescheduled for live Sky Sports broadcasting.

| 7 March 2026 36 | Blackburn Rovers | 1–1 | Portsmouth | Blackburn |
| 12:30 GMT | Cashin (yellow card) 83'; Carter 90+3', (yellow card) 90+4' | Report | Ogilvie 84' | Stadium: Ewood Park; Attendance: 14,100; Referee: Tom Nield |
Note: Fixture was originally scheduled for a 15:00 kick-off, but was moved for live Sky Sports broadcasting.

| 11 March 2026 37 | Oxford United | 1–0 | Blackburn Rovers | Littlemore |
| 19:45 GMT | Donley 34' | Report | McLoughlin (yellow card) 27'; Carter (yellow card) 89' | Stadium: Kassam Stadium; Attendance: 9,993; Referee: David Webb |

| 14 March 2026 38 | Millwall | 1–2 | Blackburn Rovers | Bermondsey |
| 15:00 GMT | Cundle 54'; Sturge (red card) 59' | Report | Jørgensen 80', 85'; Atcheson (yellow card) 90+6' | Stadium: The Den; Attendance: 17,802; Referee: Andrew Kitchen |

| 21 March 2026 39 | Blackburn Rovers | 0–0 | Middlesbrough | Blackburn |
| 12:30 GMT | | | | Stadium: Ewood Park |
Note: Fixture was initially scheduled for a 15:00 kick-off, but was brought forward for Sky Sports broadcasting.

| 3 April 2026 40 | Birmingham City | 0–1 | Blackburn Rovers | Bordesley |
| 15:00 GMT | | Report | Forshaw (yellow card) 21'; Cantwell 69' | Stadium: St Andrew's; Referee: John Busby |

| 6 April 2026 41 | Blackburn Rovers | 0–0 | West Bromwich Albion | Blackburn |
| 15:00 BST | McLoughlin (yellow card) 23'; Pickering (yellow card) 26'; Wharton (yellow card) 45' | Report | Diakité (yellow card) 47'; Dike (yellow card) 90+2' | Stadium: Ewood Park; Attendance: 21,581; Referee: Robert Jones |

| 11 April 2026 42 | Stoke City | 1–1 | Blackburn Rovers | Stoke-on-Trent |
| 15:00 BST | Phillips (yellow card) 47' (yellow-red card) 87'; Rak-Sakyi 56', (yellow card) 62'; Baker (yellow card) 88'; Pearson (yellow card) 88' | Report | Forshaw 21'; Baradji (yellow card) 31'; Ōhashi (yellow card) 33'; Alebiosu (yellow card) 45' | Stadium: bet365 Stadium; Attendance: 22,718; Referee: Bobby Madley |

| 14 April 2026 45 | Southampton | 3–0 | Blackburn Rovers | Southampton |
| 20:00 BST | Larin 24'; Manning 43'; Archer 86' | Report | McLoughlin (yellow card) 5'; Gardner-Hickman (yellow card) 7' | Stadium: St Mary's Stadium; Attendance: 25,576; Referee: Josh Smith |
Note: Fixture was initially scheduled for a 15:00 kick-off, but was pushed back for live Sky Sports broadcasting. It was then brought forward a fortnight due to Southampton in FA Cup semi-final involvements.

| 17 April 2026 43 | Blackburn Rovers | 1–1 | Coventry City | Blackburn |
| 20:00 BST | Ōhashi (yellow card) 7'; Ribeiro (yellow card) 51'; Morishita 54', (yellow card) 65'; Gardner-Hickman (yellow card) 65' | Report | Onyeka (yellow card) 51'; Thomas 84' | Stadium: Ewood Park; Attendance: 19,657; Referee: Lewis Smith |
Note: Fixture was initially scheduled for 18 April, but was brought forward a day for Sky Sports broadcasting.

| 22 April 2026 44 | Sheffield United | 1–3 | Blackburn Rovers | Sheffield |
| 19:45 BST | Tanganga (yellow card) 15'; Burrows 57'; Hamer (yellow card) 58' | Report | Ōhashi 12', 45'; Morishita 32', (yellow card) 53'; Ribeiro (yellow card) 82'; Cashin (yellow card) 90+4'; Cantwell (yellow card) 90+4' | Stadium: Bramall Lane; Attendance: 25,987; Referee: Farai Hallam |

| 2 May 2026 46 | Blackburn Rovers | 0–1 | Leicester City | Blackburn |
| 12:30 BST | McLoughlin (yellow card) 62' | Report | Pereira (yellow card) 54'; Mavididi 78' | Stadium: Ewood Park; Attendance: 19,436 (2,034 away); Referee: Leigh Doughty |

=== FA Cup ===
Blackburn were drawn away to Hull City in the third round.

Win Draw Loss Fixtures

| 11 January 2026 Third round | Hull City | 0–0 (a.e.t.) (4–3 p) | Blackburn Rovers | Kingston upon Hull |
| 14:30 GMT | Famewo (yellow card) 45'; McBurnie (yellow card) 74'; Drameh (yellow card) 76'; Slater (yellow card) 116' | Report | Powell (yellow card) 31'; O'Riordan (yellow card) 47'; Gardner-Hickman (yellow card) 119' | Stadium: MKM Stadium; Attendance: 6,627; Referee: Will Finnie |
| | Penalties |
| | Coyle (penalty missed); Joseph (penalty scored); McBurnie (penalty scored); Hughes (penalty scored); Akintola (penalty scored) | | Ōhashi (penalty missed); Baradji (penalty missed); Gardner-Hickman (penalty scored); McLoughlin (penalty scored); Doherty (penalty scored) |

=== EFL Cup ===
Blackburn were drawn at home to Bradford City in the first round.

Win Draw Loss Fixtures

| 12 August 2025 First round | Blackburn Rovers | 1–2 | Bradford City | Blackburn |
| 19:45 BST | Tronstad (yellow card) 14'; De Neve 45+4'; Gueye (yellow card) 68'; Kargbo (yellow card) 88' | Report | Touray 2'; Swan 4'; Lapslie (yellow card) 36'; Tilt (yellow card) 68'; Walker (yellow card) 78'; Humprhys (yellow card) 90+4' | Stadium: Ewood Park; Attendance: 9,855 (3,296 away); Referee: Anthony Backhouse |

== Statistics ==
=== Appearances ===
As of match played 2 May 2026

Players with no appearances are not included on the list

| No. | Pos | Nat | Player | Total | | Championship | | FA Cup | | EFL Cup | |
| No. | Pos | Nat | Player | Apps | Goals | Apps | Goals | Apps | Goals | Apps | Goals |
|---|---|---|---|---|---|---|---|---|---|---|---|
| 1 | GK | (England) ENG | Aynsley Pears | 13 | 0 | 12+1 | 0 | 0+0 | 0 | 0+0 | 0 |
| 2 | DF | (Nigeria) NGR | Ryan Alebiosu | 40 | 1 | 37+2 | 1 | 0+0 | 0 | 0+1 | 0 |
| 3 | DF | (England) ENG | Harry Pickering | 16 | 0 | 8+7 | 0 | 0+0 | 0 | 1+0 | 0 |
| 4 | DF | (Portugal) POR | Yuri Ribeiro | 23 | 0 | 18+4 | 0 | 0+1 | 0 | 0+0 | 0 |
| 5 | MF | (England) ENG | Taylor Gardner-Hickman | 31 | 0 | 23+7 | 0 | 1+0 | 0 | 0+0 | 0 |
| 6 | MF | (Norway) NOR | Sondre Tronstad | 30 | 0 | 28+1 | 0 | 0+0 | 0 | 1+0 | 0 |
| 7 | FW | (Sierra Leone) SLE | Augustus Kargbo | 11 | 1 | 3+7 | 1 | 0+0 | 0 | 0+1 | 0 |
| 8 | MF | (Portugal) POR | Sidnei Tavares | 14 | 0 | 6+7 | 0 | 0+0 | 0 | 1+0 | 0 |
| 10 | MF | (England) ENG | Todd Cantwell | 29 | 5 | 22+6 | 5 | 0+0 | 0 | 0+1 | 0 |
| 11 | FW | (Iceland) ISL | Andri Guðjohnsen | 25 | 7 | 18+7 | 7 | 0+0 | 0 | 0+0 | 0 |
| 12 | DF | (Australia) AUS | Lewis Miller | 31 | 2 | 23+6 | 2 | 1+0 | 0 | 1+0 | 0 |
| 14 | MF | (Belgium) BEL | Dion De Neve | 29 | 1 | 9+18 | 0 | 1+0 | 0 | 1+0 | 1 |
| 15 | DF | (Republic of Ireland) IRL | Sean McLoughlin | 45 | 0 | 44+0 | 0 | 0+1 | 0 | 0+0 | 0 |
| 16 | DF | (England) ENG | Scott Wharton | 13 | 0 | 9+3 | 0 | 0+0 | 0 | 1+0 | 0 |
| 17 | DF | (England) ENG | Hayden Carter | 10 | 2 | 10+0 | 2 | 0+0 | 0 | 0+0 | 0 |
| 18 | MF | (Sweden) SWE | Axel Henriksson | 20 | 0 | 9+9 | 0 | 1+0 | 0 | 1+0 | 0 |
| 19 | FW | (Wales) WAL | Ryan Hedges | 24 | 1 | 18+6 | 1 | 0+0 | 0 | 0+0 | 0 |
| 20 | DF | (Republic of Ireland) IRL | Eiran Cashin | 19 | 1 | 17+1 | 1 | 1+0 | 0 | 0+0 | 0 |
| 21 | FW | (England) ENG | Dapo Afolayan | 8 | 0 | 1+7 | 0 | 0+0 | 0 | 0+0 | 0 |
| 22 | GK | (Hungary) HUN | Balázs Tóth | 35 | 0 | 34+0 | 0 | 1+0 | 0 | 0+0 | 0 |
| 23 | FW | (Japan) JPN | Yūki Ōhashi | 48 | 10 | 38+8 | 10 | 0+1 | 0 | 0+1 | 0 |
| 24 | FW | (France) FRA | Moussa Baradji | 33 | 2 | 18+14 | 2 | 0+1 | 0 | 0+0 | 0 |
| 25 | MF | (Japan) JPN | Ryōya Morishita | 37 | 4 | 33+4 | 4 | 0+0 | 0 | 0+0 | 0 |
| 26 | DF | (Republic of Ireland) IRL | Connor O'Riordan | 6 | 0 | 3+2 | 0 | 1+0 | 0 | 0+0 | 0 |
| 27 | MF | (England) ENG | Nathan Redmond | 2 | 0 | 1+1 | 0 | 0+0 | 0 | 0+0 | 0 |
| 28 | MF | (England) ENG | Adam Forshaw | 22 | 1 | 14+8 | 1 | 0+0 | 0 | 0+0 | 0 |
| 29 | FW | (Denmark) DEN | Mathias Jørgensen | 20 | 5 | 11+9 | 5 | 0+0 | 0 | 0+0 | 0 |
| 31 | MF | (Scotland) SCO | Kristi Montgomery | 23 | 0 | 7+14 | 0 | 1+0 | 0 | 1+0 | 0 |
| 32 | FW | (England) ENG | Igor Tyjon | 1 | 0 | 0+0 | 0 | 0+0 | 0 | 1+0 | 0 |
| 35 | GK | (England) ENG | Nicholas Michalski | 1 | 0 | 0+0 | 0 | 0+0 | 0 | 1+0 | 0 |
| 38 | DF | (Northern Ireland) NIR | Tom Atcheson | 15 | 0 | 11+3 | 0 | 1+0 | 0 | 0+0 | 0 |
| 40 | DF | (England) ENG | Matty Litherland | 5 | 0 | 4+1 | 0 | 0+0 | 0 | 0+0 | 0 |
| 43 | DF | (England) ENG | George Pratt | 11 | 0 | 10+0 | 0 | 0+1 | 0 | 0+0 | 0 |
| 44 | DF | (United States) USA | Brandon Powell | 2 | 0 | 1+0 | 0 | 1+0 | 0 | 0+0 | 0 |
| 47 | FW | (Northern Ireland) NIR | Aodhan Doherty | 4 | 0 | 1+2 | 0 | 0+1 | 0 | 0+0 | 0 |
| 52 | FW | (England) ENG | Nathan Dlamini | 5 | 0 | 0+4 | 0 | 1+0 | 0 | 0+0 | 0 |
Player(s) who featured but departed the club permanently during the season:
| 5 | DF | (Scotland) SCO | Dominic Hyam | 4 | 0 | 4+0 | 0 | 0+0 | 0 | 0+0 | 0 |
| 9 | FW | (Senegal) SEN | Makhtar Gueye | 17 | 0 | 0+16 | 0 | 0+0 | 0 | 1+0 | 0 |
| 21 | MF | (England) ENG | John Buckley | 1 | 0 | 0+0 | 0 | 0+0 | 0 | 0+1 | 0 |
| 27 | MF | (England) ENG | Lewis Travis | 1 | 0 | 1+0 | 0 | 0+0 | 0 | 0+0 | 0 |

=== Goalscorers ===
As of match played 22 April 2026

| Rank | No. | Pos. | Name | League | FA Cup | EFL Cup | Total |
|---|---|---|---|---|---|---|---|
| 1 | 23 | FW | (Japan) Yūki Ōhashi | 10 | 0 | 0 | 10 |
| 2 | 11 | FW | (Iceland) Andri Guðjohnsen | 7 | 0 | 0 | 7 |
| 3 | 10 | MF | (England) Todd Cantwell | 5 | 0 | 0 | 5 |
| 4 | 29 | FW | (Denmark) Mathias Jørgensen | 5 | 0 | 0 | 5 |
| 5 | 25 | MF | (Japan) Ryōya Morishita | 4 | 0 | 0 | 4 |
| 6 | 12 | DF | (Australia) Lewis Miller | 2 | 0 | 0 | 2 |
| 6 | 17 | DF | (England) Hayden Carter | 2 | 0 | 0 | 2 |
| 6 | 24 | MF | (France) Moussa Baradji | 2 | 0 | 0 | 2 |
| 7 | 2 | DF | (Nigeria) Ryan Alebiosu | 1 | 0 | 0 | 1 |
| 7 | 7 | FW | (Sierra Leone) Augustus Kargbo | 1 | 0 | 0 | 1 |
| 7 | 14 | MF | (Belgium) Dion De Neve | 0 | 0 | 1 | 1 |
| 7 | 19 | FW | (Wales) Ryan Hedges | 1 | 0 | 0 | 1 |
| 7 | 20 | DF | (Republic of Ireland) Eiran Cashin | 1 | 0 | 0 | 1 |
| 7 | 27 | MF | (England) Adam Forshaw | 1 | 0 | 0 | 1 |
| Total | | | | 43 | 0 | 1 | 44 |

=== Assists ===
As of match played 22 April 2026

| Rank | No. | Pos. | Name | League | FA Cup | EFL Cup | Total |
|---|---|---|---|---|---|---|---|
| 1 | 25 | MF | (Japan) Ryōya Morishita | 9 | 0 | 0 | 9 |
| 2 | 2 | DF | (Nigeria) Ryan Alebiosu | 5 | 0 | 0 | 5 |
| 3 | 10 | MF | (England) Todd Cantwell | 3 | 0 | 0 | 3 |
| 4 | 6 | MF | (Norway) Sondre Tronstad | 2 | 0 | 0 | 2 |
| 4 | 12 | DF | (Australia) Lewis Miller | 2 | 0 | 0 | 2 |
| 4 | 19 | FW | (Wales) Ryan Hedges | 2 | 0 | 0 | 2 |
| 5 | 4 | DF | (Portugal) Yuri Ribeiro | 1 | 0 | 0 | 1 |
| 5 | 7 | FW | (Sierra Leone) Augustus Kargbo | 1 | 0 | 0 | 1 |
| 5 | 8 | MF | (Portugal) Sidnei Tavares | 1 | 0 | 0 | 1 |
| 5 | 14 | MF | (Belgium) Dion De Neve | 1 | 0 | 0 | 1 |
| 5 | 20 | DF | (Republic of Ireland) Eiran Cashin | 1 | 0 | 0 | 1 |
| 5 | 23 | FW | (Japan) Yūki Ōhashi | 1 | 0 | 0 | 1 |
| 5 | 43 | DF | (England) George Pratt | 1 | 0 | 0 | 1 |
| 5 | 44 | DF | (United States) Brandon Powell | 1 | 0 | 0 | 1 |
| Total | | | | 31 | 0 | 0 | 31 |
