= Nathan Dlamini =

English footballer (born 2007)

Personal information
- Full name: Nathan Mpho Dlamini
- Date of birth: 8 February 2007 (age 19)
- Place of birth: England
- Position: Winger

Team information
- Current team: West Bromwich Albion

Youth career
- Walsall
- –2023: Aston Villa
- 2023–2026: Blackburn Rovers
- 2026–: West Bromwich Albion

Senior career*
Years	Team	Apps	(Gls)
2025–2026	Blackburn Rovers	4	(0)
2026–	West Bromwich Albion	0	(0)
- * Club domestic league appearances and goals as of 14:21, 1 January 2026 (UTC) ‡ National team caps and goals as of 15:58, 23 December 2025 (UTC)

Nathan Mpho Dlamini (born 08 February 2007) is an English professional footballer who plays as a winger for EFL Championship club West Bromwich Albion.

== Club career ==
Dlamini was a product of the youth systems at Walsall and Aston Villa.

=== Blackburn Rovers ===
Dlamini joined the youth academy of Blackburn Rovers on 15 May 2023 on a 2-year contract. On 2 August 2024, he signed his first professional contract with Blackburn until 2026. On 20 December 2025, he debuted with Blackburn Rovers in a 2–0 EFL Championship win over Millwall as a substitute.

=== West Bromwich Albion ===
On 17 August 2026, Dlamini joined West Bromwich Albion on a 2 year contract after rejecting a new contract at Blackburn Rovers.

== Personal life ==
Born in England, Dlamini is of Zimbabwean descent.

== Career statistics ==
As of match played 11 January 2026

Appearances and goals by club, season and competition
Club	Season	League			FA Cup		League Cup		Other		Total	
Club	Season	Division	Apps	Goals	Apps	Goals	Apps	Goals	Apps	Goals	Apps	Goals
Blackburn Rovers	2025–26	Championship	4	0	1	0	—		—		5	0
West Bromwich Albion	2026–27	Championship	0	0	0	0	0	0	0	0	0	0
Career total			4	0	1	0	0	0	0	0	5	0
