= Brandon Powell (soccer) =

American soccer player

Personal information
- Date of birth: October 17, 2005 (age 21)
- Place of birth: Huddersfield, England
- Height: 1.73 m (5 ft 8 in)
- Positions: Left midfielder; left-back; left wing-back

Team information
- Current team: Blackburn Rovers

Youth career
- –2016: Manchester City
- 2016–2025: Blackburn Rovers

Senior career*
Years	Team	Apps	(Gls)
2024–	Blackburn Rovers	1	(0)
2024–2025	→ Chorley (loan)	4	(0)
2025	→ Altrincham (loan)	0	(0)
2026	→ Barrow (loan)	3	(0)

International career^{‡}
2026–	United States U21	1	(0)
- * Club domestic league appearances and goals as of 08:52, February 14, 2026 (UTC) ‡ National team caps and goals as of March 27, 2026

Brandon Powell (born October 17, 2005) is a professional soccer player who plays as a midfielder for EFL Championship club Blackburn Rovers. Born in England, he represents the United States at youth level.

== Club career ==
On July 3, 2024, Powell signed his first professional contract at Blackburn Rovers. On November 26, 2024, he joined Chorley on loan. Powell joined Altrincham on loan on March 28, 2025.

On May 11, 2025, Powell signed a new deal with Blackburn. On January 11, 2026, he made his debut in the FA Cup, starting the game against Hull City. On January 20, he made his league debut against Swansea City, recording an assist in the match.

On January 29, 2026, Powell joined Barrow on loan for the rest of the end.

== International career ==
Born in England, Powell is eligible to play for England, the United States, and Jamaica. On March 20, 2026, he earned his first call-up to the United States under-21 squad, making his debut in 2–0 victory over Japan.

== Career statistics ==
As of match played on January 7, 2026

Appearances and goals by club, season and competition
Club	Season	League			National cup		League Cup		Other		Total	
Club	Season	Division	Apps	Goals	Apps	Goals	Apps	Goals	Apps	Goals	Apps	Goals
Blackburn Rovers	2025–26	Championship	1	0	1	0	0	0	—		2	0
Barrow (loan)	2025–26	League Two	2	0	—		—		—		2	0
Career total			3	0	1	0	0	0	0	0	4	0
